= Noisia discography =

This is the discography for the Dutch electronic music ensemble Noisia. They have released three studio albums as Noisia, and one under the name I Am Legion with Foreign Beggars. Additionally, they have released soundtracks for the video games DmC: Devil May Cry and Armajet.

== Albums ==
=== Studio albums ===
Title	Details
Split the Atom	Released: April 5, 2010; Label: Vision, Division, mau5trap; Formats: EP, CD, digital download, streaming
I Am Legion (with Foreign Beggars)	Released: September 2, 2013; Label: Division, OWSLA, Par Excellence; Formats: LP, CD, digital download, streaming
Outer Edges	Released: August 5, 2016; Label: Vision; Formats: LP, CD, digital download, streaming
Closer	Released: April 28, 2022; Label: Vision; Formats: LP, CD, digital download, streaming

=== Compilation albums ===
Title	Details
FabricLive.40	Released: June 9, 2008; Label: Fabric; Formats: CD, digital download
Outer Edges: Remixes	Released: April 7, 2017; Label: Vision; Formats: CD, digital download, streaming

=== Soundtrack albums ===
Title	Details
DmC: Devil May Cry Soundtrack	Released: January 8, 2013; Label: Division; Formats: CD, digital download, streaming
Armajet Soundtrack	Released: January 24, 2020; Label: Vision; Formats: Digital download, streaming

== EPs ==
Year	Album	Label
2005	Monster	Subtitles
2005	Block Control	Moving Shadow
2006	Lekker	Vision
2008	Collision	Vision
2010	Machine Gun	Vision
2010	Split the Atom	Vision
2012	Imperial	Vision
2014	Purpose	Vision
2015	Incessant	Vision
2015	Dead Limit (with The Upbeats)	Vision
2017	Outer Edges (Noisia Remixes)	Vision

== Singles ==
Year	Title
2003	"Silicon" / "Tomahawk" (with Mayhem)
2004	"Massada" / "Lifeless" (by Spinor)
2004	"Drytears" (by Predator and Adi J) / "Cloudshine"
2004	"Hubcap" / "Back Draft"
2005	"The Tide" / "Concussion"
2005	"The Flow" / "The Ooze" (by Stampede)
2005	"Brainstitch" / "Deeper Love" (by Drifter)
2005	"Lockjaw" (with Mayhem) / "Absolom" (by Spinor)
2006	"Façade" / "Moonway Renegade" (with Mayhem)
2006	"Gutterpump"
2006	"Lost Cause" (with TeeBee) / "Choke" (with Mayhem featuring Verse)
2006	"Bad Dreams" / "Omissions"
2006	"Homeworld" (with Phace) / "Outsource" (with Phace)
2006	"Afternoon Delight" (with Shanodin) / "Angel Eyes"
2007	"Shower for an Hour" / "Moon Palace" (with TeeBee)
2007	"Exodus" (with Mayhem featuring KRS-One)
2007	"Yellow Brick" / "Raar"
2007	"Façade VIP" / "Skanka" (by Gridlok)
2008	"Gutterpunk" (featuring Bex Riley)
2008	"Stigma" / "Crank"
2008	"Splash Step" (by Break) / "Diplodocus"
2008	"Seven Stitches" / "Groundhog"
2008	"Mordez Moi" (by Feed Me) / "B.R.U.L."
2009	"Mammoth" (by Phace and Misanthrop) / "Sore Point" (with Phace)
2009	"The Bells" / "Last Look"
2009	"CCTV" (with Phace) / "Factory 5" (by Misanthrop)
2010	"Floating Zero" (with Phace)
2010	"Underprint" (with Alix Perez)
2010	"Brain Bucket" (with Ed Rush and Optical) / "Falling Through" (with Spor)
2010	"Alpha Centauri" / "Alpha Centauri (Excision and Datsik Remix)"
2011	"Friendly Intentions" / "Displaced"
2011	"Program" (with Phace) / "Regurgitate"
2011	"Tommy's Theme"
2011	"Could This Be"
2013	"Hyenas" (with Calyx and TeeBee) / "The Liquid" (with Evol Intent)
2016	"Possession" (with Ivy Lab)
2016	"Anomaly"
2016	"Mantra"
2017	"Crazy" (as Zonderling) (with Lost Frequencies)
2018	"Dzjengis" (with Two Fingers)
2018	"Deep Down" (with Phace)
2019	"The Hole Pt. 1"
2019	"Halcyon" (with The Upbeats)
2020	"Foundations" (with Mefjus)
2021	"Supersonic (My Existence)" (with Skrillex, Josh Pan and Dylan Brady)

== Remixes ==
Year	Song	Artist
2003	"Police Brutality"	Nitekeen
2004	"Retro"	Falcon
2005	"Fade to Grey"	Visage
2005	"Messiah"	Konflict
2006	"Painkiller"	Freestylers featuring Pendulum
2006	"Pressure"	Atom & Cell
2006	"Carbon Shock"	Skynet
2006	"Untrue"	Soulproof
2007	"Bongo Bong and Je Ne T'aime Plus"	Robbie Williams
2007	"Liquid Lives"	Hadouken!
2007	"Kitchen Sink"	Amon Tobin
2007	"Façade (VIP Mix)"	Noisia
2008	"Alice"	Moby featuring Aynzli Jones and 419 Squad
2008	"Sweet Dreams (Are Made of This)"	Eurythmics
2009	"Omen"	The Prodigy
2009	"Hooligans"	Don Diablo and Example
2009	"Contact"	Foreign Beggars and Noisia
2010	"Hideous (VIP Mix)"	Black Sun Empire and Noisia
2010	"Scary Monsters and Nice Sprites"	Skrillex
2010	"Nobody Gets Out Alive"	Le Castle Vania
2011	"No Reality"	Ram Trilogy
2011	"E.T."	Katy Perry
2011	"Raise Your Weapon"	Deadmau5 featuring Greta Svabo Bech
2011	"Earthquake"	Labrinth featuring Tinie Tempah
2011	"Spartan"	Icicle
2011	"Think Big"	Boemklatsch
2012	"Bug Hunt (from Wreck-It Ralph)"	Skrillex
2012	"Smack My Bitch Up"	The Prodigy
2012	"Nothing Matters"	Mark Knight featuring Skin
2013	"Arrakis"	Black Sun Empire
2013	"Choosing For You" (Nightwatch Remix)	I Am Legion
2014	"Lost Child"	Momoiro Clover Z
2014	"Power Curve"	Hybrid
2016	"Beastmode" (Nightwatch Remix)	Alvin Risk featuring Hodgy Beats
2017	"Divide & Conquer"	What So Not
2018	"Ember"	Camo & Krooked
2018	"Hold Your Colour"	Pendulum
2018	"Asteroids"	Noisia and Prolix
2022	"Supersonic (My Existence) (VIP Mix)"	Skrillex, Noisia, Josh Pan and Dylan Brady

== Production credits ==
Year	Title	Artist	Release
2009	"Something to Write Home About"	Krause	No Guts, No Glory
2009	"Do It Again"	Krause	No Guts, No Glory
2009	"No Guts, No Glory"	Krause	No Guts, No Glory
2009	"Soaring Through the Starlight"	Krause	No Guts, No Glory
2009	"Life of My Story"	Krause	No Guts, No Glory
2009	"Fangs"	Krause	No Guts, No Glory
2009	"Follow Me"	Krause	No Guts, No Glory
2009	"Rock the Boat"	Krause	No Guts, No Glory
2009	"Outta Yer Mind"	Krause	No Guts, No Glory
2009	"Radio Edit"	Krause	No Guts, No Glory
2009	"I Want A Pony"	Krause	No Guts, No Glory
2009	"Can't Shut Me Up"	Krause	No Guts, No Glory
2009	"Contact"	Foreign Beggars	United Colours of Beggatron
2009	"Shake It"	Foreign Beggars	United Colours of Beggatron
2009	"No Holds Barred" (featuring Devlin)	Foreign Beggars	United Colours of Beggatron
2010	"Paper"	Wiley	Non-album single
2010	"Rebirth"	Hadouken!	For the Masses
2010	"Turn the Lights Out"	Hadouken!	For the Masses
2010	"M.A.D."	Hadouken!	For the Masses
2010	"Evil"	Hadouken!	For the Masses
2010	"House is Falling"	Hadouken!	For the Masses
2010	"Mic Check"	Hadouken!	For the Masses
2010	"Ugly"	Hadouken!	For the Masses
2010	"Bombshock"	Hadouken!	For the Masses
2010	"Play the Night"	Hadouken!	For the Masses
2010	"Lost"	Hadouken!	For the Masses
2010	"More Than One Way"	Kano	Non-album single
2011	"Mezelluf"	Don Diablo	Non-album single
2011	"High Road"	Alexis Jordan	Alexis Jordan
2011	"Breathe (Sha La La)"	Wretch 32	Black and White
2011	"Kill Mercy Within"	Korn	The Path of Totality
2011	"Burn the Obedient"	Korn	The Path of Totality
2011	"Let's Go"	Korn	The Path of Totality
2012	"Intro"	Kraantje Pappie	Crane
2012	"Waar Is Kraan"	Kraantje Pappie	Crane
2012	"Hoop Nu"	Kraantje Pappie	Crane
2012	"Wat Nou Als Het Lukt"	Kraantje Pappie	Crane
2012	"Ze Volgen"	Kraantje Pappie	Crane
2012	"Beter Samen"	Kraantje Pappie	Crane
2012	"Blitzkikker"	Kraantje Pappie	Crane
2012	"Barkeeper"	Kraantje Pappie	Crane
2012	"Zijn Rug Stinkt"	Kraantje Pappie	Crane
2012	"Bootycall"	Kraantje Pappie	Crane
2012	"Goed Fout"	Kraantje Pappie	Crane
2012	"Het Is Over"	Kraantje Pappie	Crane
2012	"Crane"	Kraantje Pappie	Crane
2012	"Van God Los"	Kraantje Pappie	Crane
2012	"Onderweg"	Kraantje Pappie	Crane
2013	"Sloe Gin"	Dream Mclean	Non-album single
2013	"Laat Het Beest Los"	Kraantje Pappie	Semi Bekend EP
2013	"Semi Bekend"	Kraantje Pappie	Semi Bekend EP
2013	"Cranefunk"	Kraantje Pappie	Semi Bekend EP
2013	"School Is Begonnen"	Kraantje Pappie	Semi Bekend EP
2013	"Love Dance"	Kraantje Pappie	Semi Bekend EP
2013	"Ghostin'"	Kraantje Pappie	Semi Bekend EP
2013	"Goud Over Shirt Heen (G.O.S.H.)"	Kraantje Pappie	Semi Bekend EP
2013	"Levitate" (co-production by Loadstar)	Hadouken!	Every Weekend
2013	"Bliss Out"	Hadouken!	Every Weekend
2013	"Rocket"	Dope D.O.D.	Da Roach
2013	"Spike in My Veins"	Korn	The Paradigm Shift
2014	"Ik Ren Dit"	Kraantje Pappie	Crane II
2014	"Hoe Belangrijk Vind Je Geld"	Kraantje Pappie	Crane II
2014	"Ze Wil Lopen"	Kraantje Pappie	Crane II
2014	"Droom"	Kraantje Pappie	Crane II
2014	"Met Z'n Tweeën"	Kraantje Pappie	Crane II
2014	"In Vorm (Feestie)"	Kraantje Pappie	Crane II
2014	"Onder Water"	Kraantje Pappie	Crane II
2014	"Simpele Zes"	Kraantje Pappie	Crane II
2014	"Feesttent" (featuring MC Jiggy Djé)	Kraantje Pappie	Crane II
2014	"Boze Man"	Kraantje Pappie	Crane II
2014	"Daar Lag Je Dan"	Kraantje Pappie	Crane II
2014	"Mijn Nacht"	Kraantje Pappie	Crane II
2014	"Meenemen of Hier Opeten" (featuring Roelie Vuitton, Abbeye and Fiddox)	Kraantje Pappie	Crane II
2014	"Zweet Op De Vloer"	Kraantje Pappie	Crane II
2014	"Waar Zijn De Dagen"	Kraantje Pappie	Crane II
2014	"Yippee Kayee"	Kraantje Pappie	Crane II
2014	"Hunwicke Road Interlude"	Dream Mclean	Greyscale
2015	"Drawback"	Phace	Phace & friends
2016	"The Nomad"	Mono/Poly	Division VA EP 002
2019	"Out My Head"	Fox Stevenson	Killjoy
2019	"Killjoy"	Fox Stevenson	Killjoy
2019	"Okay"	Fox Stevenson	Killjoy
2019	"Dreamland"	Fox Stevenson	Killjoy
2019	"California"	Fox Stevenson	Killjoy
2019	"Go Like"	Fox Stevenson	Killjoy
2019	"Use Me"	Fox Stevenson	Killjoy
2019	"Hold Steady"	Fox Stevenson	Killjoy
2019	"All Night"	Fox Stevenson	Killjoy
2019	"Perfect Lie"	Fox Stevenson	Killjoy
2019	"Headlights"	Fox Stevenson	Killjoy
