= Alix Perez discography =

- Studio albums: 4
- EPs: 18
- Singles: 21
- Studio albums (as Shades): 2
- Extended plays (as Shades): 3

Electronic music producer Alix Perez has released studio albums, extended plays, and singles. Perez released his debut single 1984 in October 2009 on Shogun Audio.

== Studio albums ==
=== As Alix Perez ===
List of studio albums released as Alix Perez
Title	Details	Peak chart positions
Title	Details	UK Dance
1984	Released October 2009; Label: Shogun Audio (SHACD003); Formats: CD, 3 x 12" LP, digital download	—
Chroma Chords	Released 20 May 2013; Label: Shogun Audio (SHACD007); Formats: CD, 2 x 12" LP, digital download	20
Hellion (with Headland)	Released 7 July 2023; Label: 1985 Music; Formats: 2 x 12" LP, digital download	—
Entanglements	Released 20 September 2024; Label: 1985 Music; Formats: 2 x 12" LP, digital download	—

=== With Eprom as Shades ===
List of studio albums released with Eprom as Shades
Title	Details
In Praise of Darkness	Released 13 July 2018; Label: Deadbeats; Formats: 2 x 12" LP, digital download
From A Vein	Released 5 August 2022; Label: 1985 Music; Formats: 2 x 12" LP, digital download

== Extended Plays ==
=== As Alix Perez ===
List of extended plays released as Alix Perez
Title	Details	Peak chart performance
Title	Details	UK
Allegiance EP With Lynx	Released 17 March 2008; Label: Soul:R (SOULR033); Formats: 2 x 12" EP, digital download	—
Dark Days EP With Noisia and Foreign Beggars	Released 13 September 2010; Label: Shogun Audio (SHA037); Format: Digital Download	—
U EP Featuring Stray, DJ Rashad & Spinn	Released 7 April 2014; Label: Exit Records (EXIT050); Formats: 12" single, digital download	—
Recall & Reflect EP	Released 18 September 2015; Label: Exit Records (EXIT059); Formats: 2 x 12" EP, digital download	—
Arkestra EP With Ivy Lab	Released 26 February 2016; Label: Critical Music; Formats: 2 x 12" EP, digital download	—
Elephant Dreams EP With Skeptical	Released 1 July 2016; Label: 1985 Music (ONEF001); Formats: 12" EP, digital download	—
Numbers EP	Released 25 November 2016; Label: 1985 Music (ONEF003); Formats: 12" EP, digital download	—
Without a Trace EP With Skeptical	Released 17 February 2017; Label: Exit Records (EXIT071); Formats: 2 x 12" EP, digital download	—
Synergy EP With Spectrasoul	Released 28 April 2017; Label: 1985 Music/Ish Chat Music (1985ISHCHAT001); Formats: 12" EP, digital download	—
Nighthawks EP	Released 10 October 2017; Label: 1985 Music; Formats: 12" EP, digital download	—
Enchiridion EP With Monty and Icicle	Released 28 September 2018; Label: 1985 Music; Formats: 12" EP, digital download	—
Last Rites EP	Released 26 June 2019; Label: 1985 Music; Formats: 12" EP, digital download	—
Phantonym EP	Released 13 September 2019; Label: 1985 Music (ONEF020); Formats: 12" EP, digital download	—
Ravana EP	Released 3 April 2020; Label: 1985 Music (ONEFLTD005); Formats: 12" EP, digital download	—
Without End EP	Released 18 September 2020; Label: 1985 Music; Formats: 2 x 12" EP, digital download	42
Wairua EP	Released 5 March 2022; Label: 1985 Music (ONEF041); Formats: 12" EP, digital download	—
1985 Music X Sofa Sound With DLR	Released 28 January 2022; Label: 1985 Music and Sofa Sound; Formats: 12" EP, digital download	—
Gloom EP	Released 1 March 2024; Label: 1985 Music; Formats: Digital download	—

=== With Eprom as Shades ===
List of extended plays released with Eprom as Shades
Title	Details
Shades EP	Released 31 July 2015; Label: Alpha Pup Records; Format: Digital download
Powers of Two	Released 2 May 2016; Self released; Format: Digital download
The Lower World	Released 23 May 2025; Label: Alpha Pup Records; Format: Digital download

== Singles ==
List of singles with selected chart positions
Title	Details	Peak chart positions	Album
Title	Details	UK	Album
"Dub Focus" (Note: Split with FX 909's single "Family Man".) As part of Triple Soul	Released 2004; Label: Touchin Down Productions (TDP003); Format: 12" single	—	Non-album singles
"Sound for the Masses" (Note: Split with FX 909's single "Altered Soul") With Physics	Released 2005; Label: Fokuz Records; Formats: 12" single, digital download	—	Non-album singles
"Get It On" (Note: Split with Akira & Sower's single "Chance") With FX 909	Released 2005; Label: Strictly Digital (SDCDSAMP002); Formats: 12" Single, digital download	—	Non-album singles
"Dub rock" / "Love bug"	Released 1 December 2005; Label: Horizons Music; Formats: CD, 12" Single	—	Non-album singles
"All Alone" (Note: Split with Redeyes' single "Behind Closed Doors")	Released October 2006; Label: Spearhead Records (SPEAR007); Formats: 12" Single, digital download	—	Non-album singles
"Down The Line" / "Fingerclick" Ft. MC Fats	Released 15 April 2007; Label: Shogun Audio (SHA012); Formats: 12" Single, digital download	65	Non-album singles
"Just Memories" With Specific / "Under My Skin"	Released 2006; Label: Horizons Music (HZN012); Formats: 12" Single, digital download	—	Non-album singles
"Solitary Native" / "Old Flame" With Sabre	Released 1 July 2007; Label: Shogun Audio; Formats: 12" Single, digital download	—	Non-album singles
"This is How" / "Lovechat" With Icicle and Switch	Released 3 March 2008; Label: Shogun Audio (SGN008); Formats: Digital download	—	Non-album singles
"Everglade" / "God Fearing" With Sabre	Released 3 September 2009; Label: Metalheadz (METH076); Formats: Digital download	97	Non-album singles
"I'm Free" / "Melanie"	Released 13 April 2009; Label: Shogun Audio (SHA024); Formats: 12" Single, digital download	37	1984
"Ballbag" (Note: Split with Phace's single "Stresstest") With Rockwell	Released 20 April 2012; Label: Neosignal (NSGNL009D); Formats: Digital download	—	Non-album singles
"Burning Babylon" / "Empty Words"	Released 13 August 2021; 1985 Music; Format: 12" single, digital download	87	Non-album singles
"The Ladders" / "Enemy of Reason" With Zero T	Released; Label: Dispatch Recordings (DISDUB005); Formats: 12" Single	—	Non-album singles
"CRL"	Released 1 December 2023; Label: 1985 Music (ONEF056); Formats: 12" Single, digital download	—	Non-album singles
"Elastic Soul"	Released 26 July 2024; 1985 Music (ONEF063S1); Format: Digital download	—	Entanglements
"False Promises"	Released 9 August 2024; 1985 Music (ONEF063S2); Format: Digital download	—	Entanglements
"R2R"	Released 23 August 2024; 1985 Music (ONEF063S3); Format: Digital download	—	Entanglements
"In Your Eyes"	Released 8 September 2024; 1985 Music (ONEF063S4); Format: Digital download	—	Entanglements
"Bloomsbury"	Released 1 November 2024; 1985 Music; Format: Digital download	—	Fragment / 1
"So Here It Is" (Note: Split with DLR's single "Counting the Pennies") With DLR	12 February 2025; Sofa Sound; Format: Digital download	—	Non-album single

== Other appearances ==
=== Guest appearances ===
List of guest appearances, showing year released and album name
Title	Year	Other artist(s)	Album
"Underprint" With Noisia	2010	Noisia, Joe Seven, Stray	Invisible 002 EP
"Through My Eyes" With DBridge	2015	dBridge, Skeptical	EXITVS004
"Dreamer" With Monty	2021	Monty	Dreamer
"Black Katana" With Visages	2022	Visages	Non-album single
"Reset" With Visages	2025	Visages	Reset

=== Remix work ===
List of remix work for other artists, showing year released and album name
Title	Year	Other artist(s)	Album
Reveal	2021	Foreign Beggars	Non-album single
Veteran	2022	Bou	Non-album single
Lunar Eclipse	2023	Visages, Strategy	Non-album single

=== Radio mix appearances ===
List of radio mix appearances, showing year broadcast and selected information
Title	Year	Notes
BBC Radio 1Xtra - D&B with Bailey	2009	
BBC Radio 1 - Alix Perez Essential Mix	2013	
BBC Radio 1 - Jammz, Dread D and Alix Perez	2016	
BBC Radio 6 - Rhi, and Alix Perez Guest Mix	2019	
BBC Radio 1 - Drum&BassArena: Alix Perez	2021	
BBC Radio 1 - Chilled D&B	2023	
BBC Radio 6 - The Sweatbox - Alix Perez in the mix	2023	Guest on Sherelle's radio programme
