= Eddie Jefferys =

Moody Good
- Born: Eddie Jefferys
- Genres: Dubstep; drum and bass; hip hop; electronic
- Labels: Owsla; MTA Records; Never Say Die; Deadbeats; GUD VIBRATIONS

Edwin "Eddie" John Jefferys is an English music producer, artist and sound designer. He is best known for his work as a member of the duo 16bit, his solo projects Moody Good and Kidnappa, and formerly as part of the duo Broken Note.

His work as 16bit employed bass heavy music, and resulted in multiple publishing syncs for Nike, the Transformers film series and the film Safe House. He was involved with the production of Björk's Biophilia album.

He released his debut solo album Moody Good with MTA Records and Owsla on 2 June 2014. The album won Best Album in the 2014 Bass Music Awards.

Jefferys produced a single for the rap group Foreign Beggars entitled "Anywhere", provided additional production for the Chase & Status track "Gangsta Boogie" and remixed Yogi's single featuring Pusha T 'Burial'.

He later released a 6 track EP on OWSLA's sister label NEST entitled This Is The Investigation, in 2015, which explored experimental sounds and textures.

Jefferys worked alongside Skrillex as a sound designer on the film Transformers: Age of Extinction.

In 2017 Jefferys released a collection of music in the form of 3 mixes/mixtapes entitled Music To Go Fuck Yourself To, and remixed Noisia's track "Get Deaded"

Whilst continuing to produce and release solo music under the Moody Good alias, Jefferys works with British video artist and Director Chris Cunningham on audio/visual projects.

In 2019, Jefferys released his sophomore extended play Goofball through English record label Never Say Die on 15 March 2019.
