= Outer Edges =

Studio album by Noisia
- Released: 5 August 2016
- Recorded: 2014–6
- Genres: Drum and bass; neurofunk; techstep; dubstep; breakbeat; nu-jazz
- Length: 58:24
- Label: Vision Recordings
- Producers: Martijn van Sonderen; Nik Roos; Thijs de Vlieger

Noisia chronology
I Am Legion (2013)	Outer Edges (2016)	Closer (2022)

Singles from Outer Edges
- 1. "Anomaly" Released: 10 June 2016; 2. "Voodoo" Released: 14 July 2016; 3. "Mantra" Released: 5 August 2016

Alternate cover
- Outer Edges (Remixes) cover

Alternate cover
- Outer Edges (Noisia Remixes) cover

Outer Edges is the third studio album by Dutch electronic trio, Noisia. Outer Edges was released on 5 August 2016, by Noisia's own record label Vision Recordings. Outer Edges was later followed up by a 20-song remix album in April 2017 and a 5-song remix extended play by Noisia in June 2017.

== Background and composition ==
Outer Edges was originally planned to release on 16 September, however a month prior to release, the album was leaked online, prompting Noisia to release the album earlier than expected. The trio later explained why they decided to release the album a month prior to its supposed release date, stating:

Friday Night, while we were in the final minutes of setting up the stage for our first ever Outer Edges show, we received the news that our album had been leaked. We think you can imagine how bad we felt at that moment.

We realise it’s 2016, and things like these happen all the time. Still, it’s quite a setback. All the plans we’ve made have to be scrapped and replaced by something less ideal, because we have to react to this unfortunate situation.

Even though we are unhappy about this leak, we’re still really happy with the music. We really hope you will enjoy it as much as we’ve enjoyed making it.

Outer Edges officially released on 5 August 2016, being the first solo album by Noisia in 6 years. The album was released alongside a European tour of the same name. When officially announcing the album, Noisia stated:

It’s called Outer Edges because it’s us exploring the outer edges of what Noisia, the three of us together, is. It's about the idea that all the songs are little islands that we take to their individual edge... They’re all like expeditions to far sides. That doesn’t mean that it’s everything; it’s just that every song, if it goes in a certain direction, we’ve taken it all the way there. There are no real concessions – we haven’t been super DJ-friendly or radio-friendly at all. We’ve done no collaborations and hardly any vocals on the album.

== Reception and release ==
Fan Fiction of NEST HQ stated "Outer Edges may not be a perfect album — I think consolidating some of its more redundant or wandering midsection could’ve helped make the overall piece a bit more digestible — but its consistency in futuristic concepts, its ability to transport you to different worlds, and its bar-raising production and execution make it one of the best releases of the year so far".

Dan Gassis of Disposable Media compared Outer Edges to Noisia's previous album, Split the Atom, stating "There’s no doubt that Outer Edges has a lot of good content and is at least worth a listen on streaming sites, but when Split The Atom had the great vocals and big drops of My World, or the superb structure of Shellshock, or the iconic sound of Stigma…you start to wonder what the equivalents are on Outer Edges. Anomaly has a lot of flavour and never gets old, and The Entangled may improve with repeat listens, but the standouts aren’t immediately evident…"

Azasia Durgapershad of The Music Essentials stated "I’ve gotta say, this album was something else. Plenty of musical surprises from Noisia. As a fan and listener of music, I appreciate their artistry and definitely suggest you check this album out. As they have stated, the tracks aren’t really DJ friendly, but we understand that there’s more to electronic music than just to dance. This is an album you can just sit back and soak in all of the musical pleasure".

Adam of Ninja Ninja Drum & Bass praised the album, stating "For me, Outer Edges is just a natural extension of the ethos Noisia have come to represent and the place that they hold in the bass community. The LP is insanely good, it has their trademark impeccable sound design, a lot of variety, some intense originality and it’s just packed full of deep, dark and murky vibes that mean I highly, highly doubt we’re going to hear a better album this year".

Matthew Meadow of Your EDM stated "Outer Edges, their first album in 6 years, explores a variety of bass-centric styles. While the drum & bass masters explore genres at a tangent to drum & bass, the album is phenomenal in every aspect. Sound design, exploration, innovation and boldness abound in the 18 tracks on this album. They really left no stone unturned".

=== Accolades ===
Outer Edges received Best Album, Best Video for the single Mantra and awarded Noisia with Best Producer for the 8th annual Drum&BassArena Awards.

Year	Ceremony	Nominated work	Recipient(s)	Category	Result
2016	Drum&BassArena Awards	"Outer Edges"	Noisia	Best Album	Won
2016	Drum&BassArena Awards	"Mantra"	Noisia	Best Video	Won

== Outer Edges (Remixes) ==
On 7 April 2017, a remix album of Outer Edges was released by Vision Recordings. The remix album featured 18 remixes from various artists, including remixes from electronic producers Machinedrum, Mat Zo, Bassnectar and Moody Good. When announcing the release of the remix album, Noisia stated:

When we made the original we went as far as we could within our own confines; exploring and stretching the outer edges. With this remix package we asked a lot of different artists to take that material beyond our edges, into their respective domains. We are really happy that they managed to take our music into completely different dimensions, with such exciting results!

Peter Rubinstein of Your EDM praised the remix album, stating "Mat Zo, Dyro, Camo & Krooked, Tsuruda, Moody Good, Bassnectar and more lent their contributions to the list, culminating in a listening experience that truly pushes the boundaries of the original’s impact and potential".

Nathan Beer of Nest HQ generally liked Ivy Lab's remix of Tentacles, stating "It’s one of those tunes you just have to skank to. Ivy Lab and their signature "never enough atomic weight and experimentation" approach to music work incredibly well on Tentacles". Sagar Deshmukh of The Music Essentials praised Camo & Krooked's remix of The Entangled, stating "The duo took one of the most remarkable tunes from the album The Entangled – Camo & Krooked stretched out the space and add their own harrowed textures and tones in the most minimal, mysterious and deepest ways".

On 16 October 2016, prior to the release of Outer Edges (Remixes), Canadian electronic artist deadmau5 was shown to be remixing Noisia's song Collider in a live production session, confirming that it would be an official remix for Noisia in the livestream chat, however the remix did not appear on the remix album.

== Outer Edges (Noisia Remixes) ==
On 9 June 2017, a remix extended play of Outer Edges was released by Vision Recordings. The remix extended play featured 5 Outer Edges remixes by Noisia, including a remix of Voodoo, Surfaceless and a remix of the 2015 song Dead Limit by Noisia and New Zealand electronic duo, The Upbeats. When speaking about the extended play, Noisia stated:

We recently put a new twist on some of our own songs for the Outer Edges audiovisual shows and decided to make them release worthy. We treated Dead Limit, Diplodocus, Tommy’s Theme, and Surfaceless. This Voodoo remix is the last one we finished, and that’s probably why this is currently the one we’re most hyped about ourselves.

Nick Grindrod of By The Waves praised the extended play, stating "Crossing grimy halftime beats with Dubstep, these five songs will make your jaw drop multiple times with the sheer quality of production". Matthew Meadow commented on Noisia's remix of Dead Limit, stating "Lots of syncopated synths and off-kilter drum beats merge to create a wholly unanticipated sonic event unlike much of anything being released today".

Kanvar Kohli of Dancing Astronaut generally liked Noisia's remix of Surfaceless, stating "While the original is more of an interlude than a complete song at less than two minutes long, the Dutch trio has re-worked it into a full-fledged track, while keeping the entire atmospheric vibe of the original track intact", further stating "Surfaceless is a great auditory reflection of Noisia’s current musical experimentation, and steadily grows on the listener with time".

== Track listing ==
Outer Edges
No.	Title	Length
1.	"The Approach"	1:29
2.	"Anomaly"	4:03
3.	"Collider"	4:47
4.	"Vigilantes"	2:48
5.	"Tentacles"	3:11
6.	"Voodoo"	3:16
7.	"Mantra"	3:49
8.	"Surfaceless"	1:40
9.	"Straight Hook"	3:23
10.	"Stonewalled"	3:38
11.	"Motion Blur"	3:24
12.	"The Entangled"	3:15
13.	"Exavolt"	3:02
14.	"Into Dust"	4:20
15.	"Miniatures"	2:53
16.	"Sinkhole"	3:29
17.	"Get Deaded"	3:57
18.	"The Approach" (Reprise)	2:00
Total length:		58:24

Outer Edges (Remixes)
No.	Title	Length
1.	"Mantra" (Mat Zo Remix)	4:26
2.	"Get Deaded" (Machinedrum Remix)	3:03
3.	"Tentacles" (Ivy Lab Remix)	4:22
4.	"Into Dust" (Neonlight Remix)	6:07
5.	"Sinkhole" (Posij Remix)	4:36
6.	"Anomaly" (Dyro Remix)	3:36
7.	"Collider" (The Upbeats Remix)	5:38
8.	"The Entangled" (Camo & Krooked Remix)	4:42
9.	"Exavolt" (Mefjus Remix)	3:01
10.	"Into Dust" (Tsuruda Remix)	4:07
11.	"Tentacles" (Teddy Killerz Remix)	3:32
12.	"Vigilantes" (Amon Tobin Remix)	6:56
13.	"Stone Walled" (Hybris Remix)	3:42
14.	"Motion Blur" (DLR Remix)	4:59
15.	"Miniatures" (Phace Remix)	3:24
16.	"Get Deaded" (Roly Porter Remix)	4:44
17.	"Get Deaded" (Moody Good Remix)	5:22
18.	"Miniatures" (Mono/Poly Remix)	3:24
19.	"Get Deaded" (Bassnectar Remix)	3:04
20.	"The Approach" (Rival Consoles Remix)	5:08
Total length:		1:27:53

Outer Edges (Noisia Remixes)
No.	Title	Length
1.	"Voodoo" (Noisia's 'Outer Edges' Remix)	4:33
2.	"Tommy's Theme" (Noisia's 'Outer Edges' Remix)	4:26
3.	"Dead Limit" (with The Upbeats, Noisia's 'Outer Edges' Remix)	4:22
4.	"Diplodocus" (Noisia's 'Outer Edges' Remix)	3:06
5.	"Surfaceless" (Noisia's 'Outer Edges' Remix)	2:40
Total length:		19:07

== Chart history ==
Chart History	Peak position
Billboard Top Dance/Electronic Albums (2016)	18
