= Asylum Speakers =

Studio album by Foreign Beggars
- Released: 15 September 2003
- Genre: British hip hop
- Length: 66:13
- Label: Dented
- Producer: Dagnabbit

Foreign Beggars chronology
Asylum Speakers (2003)	Stray Point Agenda (2006)

Asylum Speakers is the debut album by the UK-based hip-hop group Foreign Beggars. It was released on 15 September 2003 on the group's own Dented Records label.

== Track listing ==
No.	Title	Length
1.	"Intro"	1:33
2.	"Stabilize" (featuring Graziella and Kashmere)	3:52
3.	"Glacial" (featuring Dr Syntax)	4:18
4.	"Where Did the Sun Go?" (featuring Anik and Tommy Evans)	4:01
5.	"Flowin'" (featuring MRX and Carnage)	4:45
6.	"Interlude"	0:58
7.	"One-Take" (featuring Anik and Grim Finsta)	4:23
8.	"Gimme Dat"	3:09
9.	"Wrong Move" (featuring Tommy Evans)	3:22
10.	"Eurrr... Oh"	0:53
11.	"What Goes Up" (featuring Dr Syntax)	3:43
12.	"Hold On" (featuring DVS and Skinnyman)	3:20
13.	"Who's Next" (featuring Wayne Wonda and Tau Rai)	3:42
14.	"Frosted Perspecks" (featuring Leno)	4:14
15.	"Coded Rhythm Talk" (featuring Task Force)	3:55
16.	"Blue Gardenias"	0:42
17.	"Mind Out" (featuring Underground Alliance)	3:51
18.	"Prime Source" (featuring Robbin Goods)	4:25
19.	"Gettaway" (featuring Highbreed, Nassah, Pye and SuparNovar)	3:19
20.	"A Day in the Life Of..."	2:13
21.	"The Bah Spitzvah" (performed by Rabbi Shlomo)	1:33
Total length:		66:13
