= Colour of Me =

Studio album by Tasha Baxter
- Released: 9 June 2007
- Recorded: RP Studios, SABC, Johannesburg
- Genre: Pop
- Length: 46:13
- Label: EMI South Africa
- Producer: Noisia

Colour of Me is the debut studio album by South African singer-songwriter Tasha Baxter. It was released on 9 June 2007 through EMI South Africa. Produced by Noisia, the album blends elements of pop, electronic and dance music.

== Background ==
Tasha Baxter, a prominent figure in the South African music scene, gained recognition for her work as a vocalist, DJ, and performer before releasing her solo debut.

Baxter's career trajectory, spanning over a decade prior in the South African music scene, culminated in the release of "Colour of Me." Originally recorded in her lounge, the album produced the local radio hits, "Who's Sorry Now" and "Fade to Black" and "The Journey". Noisia, a Dutch production outfit, produced the album, contributing to its electronic soundscape.

Baxter's musical journey traces back to her meeting with Noisia in an online dance community. Impressed by her innovative approach to dance, trip-hop, and drum 'n' bass music, they collaborated on demos that eventually led to Baxter's deal with EMI South Africa. Baxter collaborated with Andre Scheepers over several months to craft the album's demos.

The final instrumentation and vocals were recorded at RP Studios, SABC by engineer Neal Snyman and production elements were completed by Noisia at De Noisia Kantoor, Holland. The album was mastered at the Wisseloord Studios, Holland by Darius van Helfteren.

== Music and lyrics ==
Colour of Me features a diverse range of musical styles, including electronic, reggae, drum 'n bass', trip hop, pop, and rock. The album's lyrics explore themes of love, heartbreak, self-discovery, and personal growth.

"Colour of Me" showcases Baxter's immense artistic diversity, with tracks ranging from upbeat pop to dark and dramatic. The album's lead singles, "Who's Sorry Now" and "Fade to Black," highlight Baxter's versatility as an artist, offering a glimpse into her multifaceted musical persona. Baxter's refusal to conform to generic labels is evident throughout the album, with each track presenting a unique genre-blending experience.

== Track listing ==
No.	Title	Writer(s)	Length
1.	"Useless"	Tasha Baxter, Andre Scheepers	3:54
2.	"Who's Sorry Now"	Tasha Baxter, Andre Scheepers	3:47
3.	"All That I Can Think About"	Tasha Baxter, Andre Scheepers	3:30
4.	"Don't Believe In Love"	Tasha Baxter, Andre Scheepers	2:56
5.	"Fade to Black"	Tasha Baxter, Andre Scheepers	3:31
6.	"Freefall"	Tasha Baxter, Andre Scheepers, Mark Sinclair	3:20
7.	"The Journey"	Tasha Baxter, Andre Scheepers	4:29
8.	"Fusion"	Tasha Baxter, Andre Scheepers	2:19
9.	"Don't Need Money"	Tasha Baxter, Andre Scheepers	2:56
10.	"Colour of Me"	Tasha Baxter, Andre Scheepers	2:54
11.	"Paradise"	Tasha Baxter, Andre Scheepers	3:09
12.	"Keep on Moving"	Tasha Baxter, Andre Scheepers	2:45
13.	"The Visitor"	Tasha Baxter, Noisia	5:02
14.	"Play With Me" (hidden track)	Tasha Baxter	1:34

== Credits and personnel ==
- Tasha Baxter – vocals, guitar, bass
- Noisia – production, beats, bass, synths, strings, keys
- Andre Scheepers – keys, backing vocals
- Chris Geden – guitars
- Mark Sinclair – guitars
- Brendan Ou Tim – bass
- Ruud Boelens – guitars
- Elizabeth Rennie – strings
- Kate O'Hanlon – strings
- Srdjan Cuca – strings
- Laurie Howe – strings
- Marcus Wyatt – horns
- Kevin Davidson – horns
- "The Opera House" - horns
- Neil Snyman - mixing engineer
- Darius van Helfteren - mastering engineer

== Distribution ==
"Colour of Me" was exclusively released in South Africa in 2007 through traditional distribution channels. The album was made available on physical CDs, with singles receiving airplay on local radio stations.

The single "Fade to Black" has a fully filmed music video that aired on local TV channels, and is also not available worldwide or on any digital streaming to present day.

However, it wasn't until 2020, thirteen years after its initial release, that "Colour of Me" was digitally distributed worldwide by Universal Music. This digital release allowed the album to reach a wider audience beyond South Africa, marking a new chapter in its availability and accessibility to music listeners worldwide.

== Critical reception ==
The album received widespread acclaim, with critics praising its substantial lyrical content and diverse sonic palette.

Cape Times lauded Baxter's versatility and the album's meticulously crafted appeal to a broad audience, noting its potential to succeed internationally.

The album received positive reviews from music critics, who praised Baxter's vocals, songwriting, and the album's production quality.

In a 4-star review from Heat magazine praised Baxter's "sweet, soulful voice" likening "Fade to Black" as a Kylie Minogue track. Neveling described the album as having "playful melodies with electronic beats" that would "hook" listeners.

Randall Abrahams review from Financial Mail commended Baxter's "silver-toned pipes" hearing Baxter sing live at the studio before hearing the album. Abrahams commented the main focus is Baxter's "mellifluous voice" and uses it "gracious effect" throughout the album. At times the 'Colour of Me' reminds him of the pop-art of Sophie Ellis Bextor. Abrahams praises the album's production by Noisia, though noted some inconsistency in the overall flow of the final product due to the changing genres. However, Abrahams that selection of singles would ensure Baxter's continued success on radio.

== Touring ==
Baxter toured heavily during this period, performing nationwide throughout South Africa. Some of the festivals and performances include:

- Oppikoppi 13
- Oppikoppi 14
- Little Hearts Festival
- Joburg Day
- My Coke Fest
- Woodstock 9

== Awards and nominations ==
Colour of Me garnered significant recognition, receiving four nominations and winning two awards at the South African Music Awards (SAMAs) in 2008.

The nominations included:

- Best Pop Album English
- Best Newcomer
- Female Solo
- Record of the Year (Tasha Baxter - Fade to Black)

Winning:

- Best Pop Album: English
- Best Newcomer

== Popular culture ==
Two tracks from Colour of Me, "The Journey" and "Don't Believe in Love," were featured in the soundtrack of the 2009 South African film White Wedding.

In 2017, the single "The Journey" was sampled on Lil Wayne's track "Hittas" on Tha Carter V album, which plays throughout the track. A testament to the longstanding influence across music culture.
