= Without a Trace (disambiguation) =

Without a Trace is a 2002–2009 American police-procedural television series.

Without a Trace may also refer to:

== Film ==
- Without a Trace (1983 film), an American drama film
- Without a Trace: June 10, 1979, a 1991 film by John Seward Johnson III
- Without a Trace (2000 film), a Mexican crime drama

== Literature ==
- Without a Trace, a 1989 Hardy Boys Casefiles novel
- Without a Trace, a 2004 Nancy Drew: Girl Detective novel
- Without a Trace: Inside the Robert Durst Case, a 2002 book by Marion Collins about Robert Durst

== Music ==
=== Albums ===
- Without a Trace, by the New Roses, 2013
- Without a Trace, an EP by Alix Perez and Skeptical, 2017

=== Songs ===
- "Without a Trace", by the Black Angels from Wilderness of Mirrors, 2022
- "Without a Trace", by Fates Warning from The Spectre Within, 1985
- "Without a Trace", by Sabbat from Mourning Has Broken, 1991
- "Without a Trace", by Soul Asylum from Grave Dancers Union, 1992
- "Without a Trace", by Trish Thuy Trang
- "Without a Trace", by Trust Company from True Parallels, 2005

== See also ==
- Spoorloos (lit. 'Without a Trace'), or The Vanishing, a 1988 Dutch-French film
- Spoorloos (TV series), a South African crime drama anthology series
