= E24 =

E24 may refer to:

- HMS E24, a Royal Navy submarine
- Nimzo-Indian Defense, Encyclopaedia of Chess Openings code
- European route E24, a road in Great Britain between Birmingham and Ipswich
- The chassis designation for the Nissan Caravan van between 1988 and 2015
- E24 series of preferred numbers
- E24 Näringsliv, a Swedish online business newspaper
- E24 Næringsliv, a Norwegian online business newspaper
- A daily British television programme about news from the entertainment industry, shown on BBC News
- BMW E24, a car produced between 1976 and 1989
- E24 (TV channel), an Indian cable television and satellite network
- Keinawa Expressway, route E24 in Japan
