= EPROM (disambiguation) =

EPROM or erasable programmable read-only memory is a type of solid-state memory chip.

Eprom may also refer to:

- Eprom (musician), an American experimental bass music artist
- EEPROM, a type of computer memory
