= I Am Legion (album) =

Studio album by Noisia x Foreign Beggars
- Released: 2 September 2013; 29 November 2013 (Instrumentals)
- Recorded: 2008–13
- Genre: Grime; hip hop; dubstep; glitch hop; drum and bass
- Length: 45:38
- Label: Division, Owsla, Par Excellence
- Producer: Nik Roos, Martijn van Sonderen, Thijs de Vlieger

Noisia chronology
Split the Atom (2010)	I Am Legion (2013)	Outer Edges (2016)

Foreign Beggars chronology
The Uprising (2012)	I Am Legion (2013)

I Am Legion is the self-titled collaborative album by I Am Legion, the side project of Dutch music producers Noisia and British rappers Metropolis and Orifice Vulgatron of Foreign Beggars. The album was released on 2 September 2013 through Division, Owsla and Par Excellence. The album topped the Beatport releases chart within three days of release. The instrumental version of the album, solely produced by Noisia, was released on 29 November 2013. A ten-track remix album featuring Noisia (as Nightwatch), dBridge, Alix Perez and Phace among others was released on 17 June 2014.

== Musical concept and songs ==
The group had the following to say about the album's style and influence:

“We (Noisia & Foreign Beggars) come from two different places and there is a mutual curiosity and admiration that makes us want to make the coolest shit we can. The style and approach to this album has given the lyrics more breathing space and room for exploration, hence it resulting in something more of a rap album with an electronic edge, as opposed to ‘Dance Music’ with raps on it.”

Speaking about the album's second single "Choosing For You", Metropolis told Rolling Stone “We kinda pieced together ideas from two beats Noisia had made to put this one together, I think it's the only track with a Noisia voice on it... The track is about letting the music possess you, as good music should when you hear it.”

== Marketing ==
=== Singles ===
- "Make Those Move" is the album's lead single. It was released on 15 July 2013 through Division and Owsla as well as for free download. It also serves as the first release on Foreign Beggars' label Par Excellence. The free download also features the instrumental edit.
- "Choosing For You" is the second single from the album. It was released on 19 August 2013. The single also features the instrumental edit. An official music video, directed by Grammy nominee Tony Truand, was premiered by Rolling Stone on 16 August 2013. It has currently received over two and a half million YouTube views. On 20 November 2015, remixes of the song by Lliam Taylor and SpacePlant were released as a remix package.

== Reception ==
Professional ratings
Review scores
Source	Rating
Dancing Astronaut	(favourable)
Clash	7/10

The album received mixed to positive reviews from critics. Clash said the following about the album:

Banking on the success of 2009’s enormous track ‘Contact’ and other atom splits means a protracted patent of rap and rucking risks running thin. The Beggars’ Orifice Vulgatron and Metropolis, MCs both, purge that possibility, staying as seven-figure showmen you hope never take responsibility, as ‘Foil’ appears dangerously close to doing. Meanwhile Noisia’s teeth-drilling TKOs, flubbery aftershocks and deathly whispers vaporising lugholes, only disappoint the Richter scale when not fully engaged or needlessly cutting short.

== Track listing ==
No.	Title	Length
1.	"Intro"	1:46
2.	"Farrda"	3:00
3.	"Make Those Move"	3:17
4.	"Upper Ratio"	0:47
5.	"Jelly Fish"	3:20
6.	"Ice"	2:40
7.	"Blue Shift"	1:20
8.	"Loose on the Leaves"	3:18
9.	"Choosing For You"	4:08
10.	"Warp Speed Thuggin'"	3:36
11.	"Stresses, Pt. 1"	1:33
12.	"Stresses, Pt. 2"	1:13
13.	"Sunken Submarine"	1:56
14.	"Dust Descends" (featuring Strange U)	4:41
15.	"Powerplay"	3:40
16.	"Foil" (featuring D.Ablo)	5:23
Total length:		45:38

Japanese edition bonus track
No.	Title	Length
17.	"Make Those Move" (XXX$$$ Remix)	3:29
Total length:		49:17

Instrumental edition
No.	Title	Length
1.	"Intro"	1:46
2.	"Farrda" (Instrumental Edit)	3:00
3.	"Make Those Move" (Instrumental Edit)	3:17
4.	"Upper Ratio"	0:47
5.	"Jelly Fish" (Instrumental Edit)	3:20
6.	"Ice" (Instrumental Edit)	2:40
7.	"Blue Shift"	1:20
8.	"Loose on the Leaves" (Instrumental Edit)	3:18
9.	"Choosing For You" (Instrumental Edit)	4:08
10.	"Warp Speed Thuggin'" (Instrumental Edit)	3:36
11.	"Stresses, Pt. 1"	1:33
12.	"Stresses, Pt. 2" (Instrumental Edit)	1:13
13.	"Sunken Submarine"	1:56
14.	"Dust Descends" (Instrumental Edit)	4:41
15.	"Powerplay" (Instrumental Edit)	3:40
16.	"Foil" (Instrumental Edit)	5:23
Total length:		45:38

I Am Legion Remixes
No.	Title	Length
1.	"Farrda" (Alix Perez Remix)	2:37
2.	"Farrda" (Starkey Remix)	3:58
3.	"Make Those Move" (Suburban Dark Remix)	3:04
4.	"Make Those Move" (Teddy Killerz Remix)	5:18
5.	"Jelly Fish" (Eprom Remix)	3:01
6.	"Loose on the Leaves" (dBridgesploitation Remix)	5:34
7.	"Choosing For You" (Nightwatch Remix)	4:30
8.	"Warp Speed Thuggin'" (Sui Gene Remix)	6:02
9.	"Warp Speed Thuggin'" (Phace Remix)	5:01
10.	"Dust Descends" (featuring Strange U) (Alix Perez Remix)	4:29

== Personnel ==
I Am Legion

- Nik Roos – producer, mixing
- Martijn van Sonderen – producer, mixing
- Thijs de Vlieger - producer, mixing
- Orifice Vulgatron - vocals, writer
- Metropolis - vocals, writer

Additional musicians

- D.Ablo - vocals (16)
- Strange U - vocals (14)

== Chart performance ==
=== Weekly charts ===
Chart (2013)	Peak position
UK Indie Breakers (OCC)	15
UK R&B Albums (OCC)	31

== Release history ==
Region	Date	Format	Label
Worldwide	2 September 2013	Digital download, CD, vinyl	Division / Owsla / Par Excellence
Japan	4 September 2013	Digital download, CD, vinyl	Division / Owsla / Par Excellence
