= Dented Records =

British record label

- Founded: 2003
- Founder: Foreign Beggars
- Status: Active
- Country of origin: UK

Dented Records is a record label headquartered in the United Kingdom, and best known as the home to critically acclaimed hip-hop act Foreign Beggars and Focused Few.

Dented Records record label was established in 2003 by Foreign Beggars as a vehicle to release their own material. The label saw the release of their first single "Where did the Sun Go" ft. Dark Circle (Jazz Fudge) and Tommy Evans establish the name and the brand. Foreign Beggars soon released their second single "Seasons Beatings" featuring Task Force and their debut album "Asylum Speakers" featured prominent UK rappers and several international artists, and was quoted by DJ Magazine as the Best Unsung UK Hip Hop album of all time.

== Artists ==
- Foreign Beggars
- Dubbledge
- Stig of the Dump
- Dr. Syntax
- Medison
- Ed Skrein

== See also ==
- List of record labels
