= Little Hearts Festival =

2008 music festival held in Cape Town, South Africa

Coordinates: 33.904859°S 18.420129°E

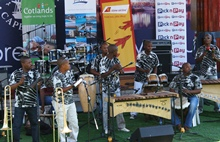
- Genre: Pop, Rock, world, electronic, Reggae, folk, hip hop
- Dates: 5, 6, 7 December 2008
- Locations: Cape Town, South Africa
- Years active: 2008
- Founders: Mark Schellhas, I Love Music Entertainment
- Website: littleheartsfestival.co.za

The Little Hearts Festival, was a three-day music festival held in Cape Town, South Africa, held 5–7 December 2008 in aid of three children's charities: Cotland’s Baby Sanctuary, CHOC, and Red Cross War Memorial Children's Hospital. The festival featured the performances of twenty-four artists at the V&A Waterfront Amphitheatre.

== Overview ==
The Little Hearts Festival, was a three-day music festival held in Cape Town, South Africa, held between 5–7 December 2008 in aid of three children's charities: Cotland’s Baby Sanctuary, CHOC, and Red Cross War Memorial Children's Hospital. The festival featured the performances of twenty-four artists at the V&A Waterfront Amphitheatre.

The fundamental philosophy of the event was that all costs were absorbed by the organisers sponsors and artists directly so that the charities would receive full benefit of donations.

All total revenue derived from the event, not just "proceeds", was collected by the charities directly, in addition to over 3’000 toys collected for the children under the care of the charities. The toys were delivered to the children over the month of December 2008 as Christmas presents.

== Location ==
The festival was held at the open-air V&A Waterfront Amphitheatre, Cape Town, South Africa.

Map showing the location of the Little Hearts Festival within Cape Town.

== Organisation ==
The festival was organised by Mark Schellhas and Melissa Rhode (through Schellhas' company, I Love Music Entertainment). Sponsorships were provided by partners in media, transport and hospitality. The artists themselves sponsored their performances. Transport logistics provided by Michael Eastman.

== Sponsors ==
The V&A Waterfront provided their Amphitheatre Stage, sound crew and security staff to the festival. Catering was supplied by the Waterfront Pick 'n Pay. Sound equipment was provided by Marshall Music, Cape Town. Avis supplied vans for transportation of the artists and toys. Airline 1time sponsored all flights and artists were accommodated by Village and Life and Protea Fire and Ice Hotels. Heart FM, Your LMG, Overtone, V&A Waterfront were the core media partners.

== Artists & schedule ==
=== Friday, 5 December 2008 ===
Time	Artist
3pm	Glenn Robertson Jazz Band
4pm	Failing Forward
5pm	12th Avenue
6pm	The Beams
7pm	Tasha Baxter
8pm	Chasing Friday
9pm	The Plastics

=== Saturday, 6 December 2008 ===
Time	Artist
10am	Pravda23
11am	Natalia
12am	Mark Schellhas
1pm	Andy Lund & The Mission Men
2pm	Abavuki
3pm	The Gugulethu Tenors
4pm	Strayplay
5pm	Jamali
6pm	JacSharp (electro)
7pm	The Lancaster Band
8pm	Louise Day Band

=== Sunday, 7 December 2008 ===
Time	Artist
10am	The Brothers Streep
11am	Captain Stu
12am	Joshua Grierson
1pm	Julia Fabrin Jakobsen
2pm	Josie Field
3pm	Forgotten Superhero
4pm	Hot Water
5pm	CODA
