= Ed Skrein =

English actor and rapper (born 1983)

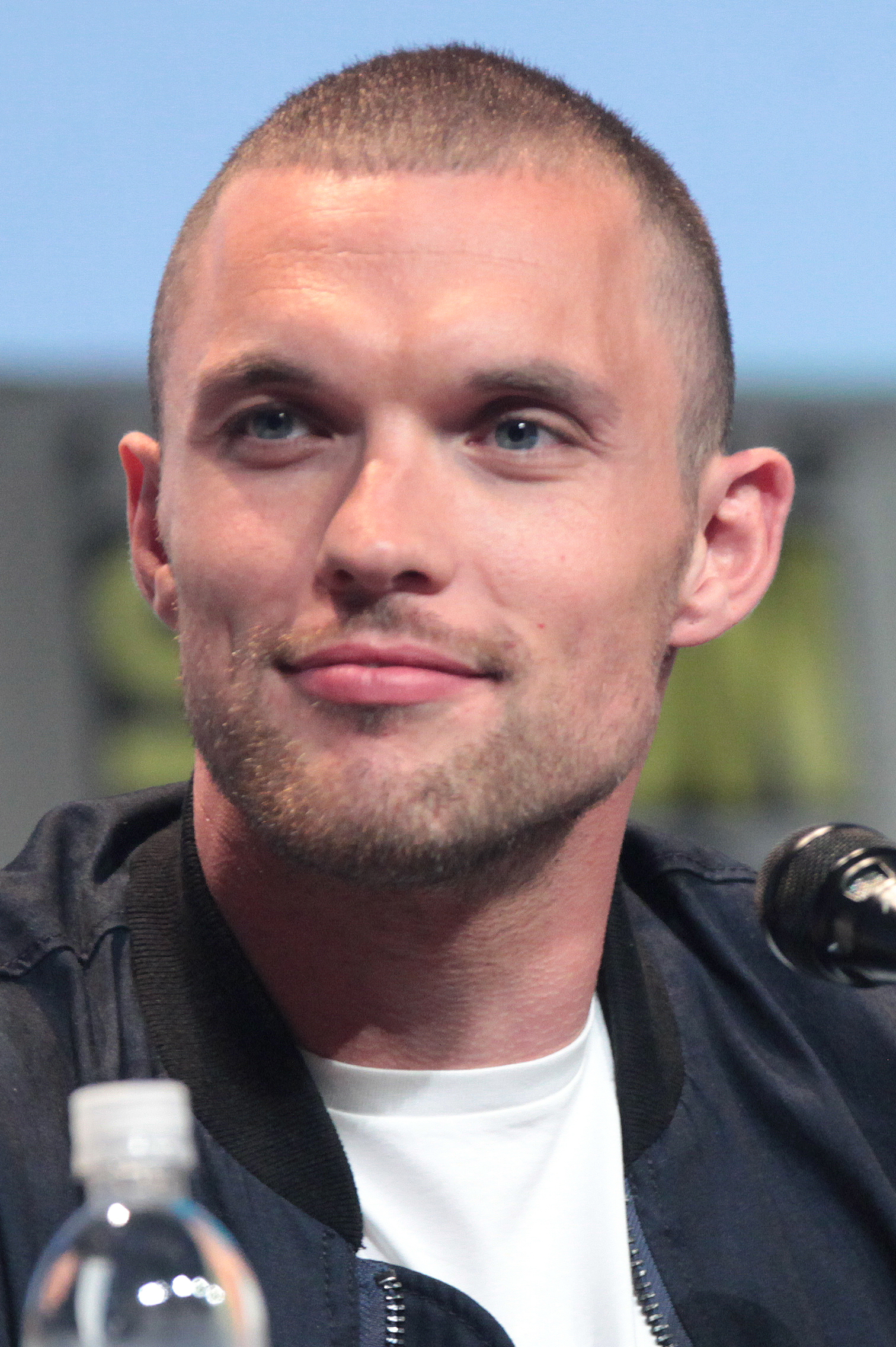
- Skrein in July 2015
- Born: Edward George Skrein; 29 March 1983 (age 43); London, England
- Other names: The Dinnerlady P.I.M.P.; Skrein
- Occupations: Actor; filmmaker; rapper
- Years active: 2004–present
- Children: 3

Edward George Skrein (/skraɪn/; born 29 March 1983) is an English actor, filmmaker and rapper. He rose to prominence as the supervillain Francis Freeman / Ajax in the superhero comedy film Deadpool (2016). He also starred in the films The Transporter: Refueled (2015), Alita: Battle Angel (2019), Midway (2019), Rebel Moon – Part One: A Child of Fire (2023), Rebel Moon – Part Two: The Scargiver (2024), and Jurassic World Rebirth (2025).

== Early life ==
Edward George Skrein was born on 29 March 1983 in the London borough of Camden. He grew up in the area and in other nearby boroughs, including Haringey and Islington.

His paternal grandparents were Austrian Jewish refugees, from Vienna, who moved to England in the 1930s to escape the Nazis; his grandmother came over on the Kindertransport.

He attended Fortismere School, then graduated from the Byam Shaw School of Art with a BA in fine art painting.

== Career ==
=== Music ===
In 2004, Skrein released a three track EP under the record label Dented Records. In 2007, he released his first album, The Eat Up. He has collaborated with a variety of artists including Foreign Beggars, Asian Dub Foundation, Plan B, Dubbledge and Doc Brown. Later that year, Skrein released a collaborative EP, Pre-Emptive Nostalgia, with the group A State of Mind. In 2009 Skrein collaborated with rapper Dr Syntax to bring the collaborative album Scene Stealers under the name Skreintax.

=== Acting ===
Skrein made his acting debut in Plan B's short film Michelle. Skrein got his first lead role in Plan B's Ill Manors. Skrein portrayed Daario Naharis in the third season of the television series Game of Thrones. However, in the fourth season of the series, he was replaced by Dutch actor Michiel Huisman. Skrein states that it was not his choice to leave the show. In 2014, Skrein was cast in The Transporter: Refueled, replacing Jason Statham as the lead. Though the film was critically panned, his performance was praised. In 2016, Skrein played the lead villain, Ajax/Francis, in the blockbuster action film Deadpool. In 2017, Skrein also appeared in the music video for 'Eye Contact' by Ocean Wisdom playing the bad guy.

In 2018, Skrein starred in psychological revenge thriller In Darkness, alongside Natalie Dormer and Stacy Martin; principal photography began in early 2016. He was slated to star in the Hellboy reboot as Ben Daimio, a Japanese-American character; after controversy over his casting, Skrein announced on Twitter that he was stepping down from the role in the hopes an actor of the proper ethnicity would be cast.

In 2019, he starred in Roland Emmerich’s blockbuster movie Midway, co-starring Mandy Moore, Patrick Wilson, Luke Evans, Aaron Eckhart, Nick Jonas, Dennis Quaid and Woody Harrelson.

In 2022, Skrein starred as Vince in I Used to Be Famous. Leslie Felperin, writing for The Guardian, gave the film 3/5 stars, calling it a "sweet-natured but predictable comedy drama".

In February 2026, he was cast as the Norse god Baldur in the upcoming live-action adaptation of the two Norse mythology-based video games in the God of War series.

=== Writing and directing ===
Skrein wrote and directed the short drama film Little River Run (2020), which was released via his Instagram page.

== Personal life ==
Skrein has a son who was born in the U.S. in 2011; he has not disclosed the mother's identity. He has three children, as revealed in an interview for the promotion of his film Rebel Moon.

Skrein has been a swimming coach for Greenwich Leisure Limited since he was 15 years old, working at leisure centres on Caledonian Road and in Archway.

== Discography ==
=== Studio albums ===
Title	Details
The Eat Up	Released: 2007; Label: Dented Records; Formats: CD, Digital download

=== Extended plays ===
Title	Details
Mind Out/Once Upon a Skrein	Released: 2004; Label: Dented Records; Formats: CD, Digital download
Pre-Emptive Nostalgia (with A State of Mind)	Released: 2007; Label: Dented Records; Formats: CD, Digital download
Scene Stealers (with Dr Syntax)	Released: 2009; Label: Skreintax; Formats: CD, Digital download

== Filmography ==
=== Film ===
Year	Title	Role	Notes
2012	Piggy	Jamie	
2012	Ill Manors	Edward "Ed" Richardson	
2012	The Sweeney	David	
2013	Goldfish	Vincent	Short film
2014	Northmen: A Viking Saga	Hjorr	
2015	Sword of Vengeance	Treden	
2015	Tiger House	Callum	
2015	Kill Your Friends	Danny Rent	
2015	The Transporter Refueled	Frank Martin Jr.	
2016	Deadpool	Francis Freeman / Ajax	MTV Movie Award for Best Fight (with Ryan Reynolds); Nominated – Teen Choice Award for Choice Movie Villain; Nominated – MTV Movie Award for Best Villain
2016	The Model	Shane White	
2018	In Darkness	Marc	
2018	Patrick	Vet	
2018	Tau	Alex	
2018	Little River Run		Short film; director and writer Encounters Short Film Festival Teen Jury Award
2018	If Beale Street Could Talk	Officer Bell	
2019	Alita: Battle Angel	Zapan	
2019	Born a King	Philby	
2019	Maleficent: Mistress of Evil	Borra	
2019	Midway	Lieutenant Dick Best	
2021	Naked Singularity	Craig	
2021	Mona Lisa and the Blood Moon	Fuzz	
2022	Taco Bell: Fry Again	The Time Fryer	Video short
2022	I Used to Be Famous	Vince	
2023	Rebel Moon – Part One: A Child of Fire	Admiral Atticus Noble	
2024	Rebel Moon – Part Two: The Scargiver	Admiral Atticus Noble	
2025	Jurassic World Rebirth	Bobby Atwater	
2026	Fortitude †	Dudley Clarke	Post-production

=== Television ===
Year	Title	Role	Notes
2013	The Tunnel	Anthony Walsh	3 episodes
2013	Game of Thrones	Daario Naharis	3 episodes
2023	All the Light We Cannot See	Herr Seidler	American drama limited series
2026	Ride or Die	Billy	8 episodes
TBA	God of War †	Baldur	Supporting role
