= Eprom (musician) =

American experimental bass music artist

EPROM
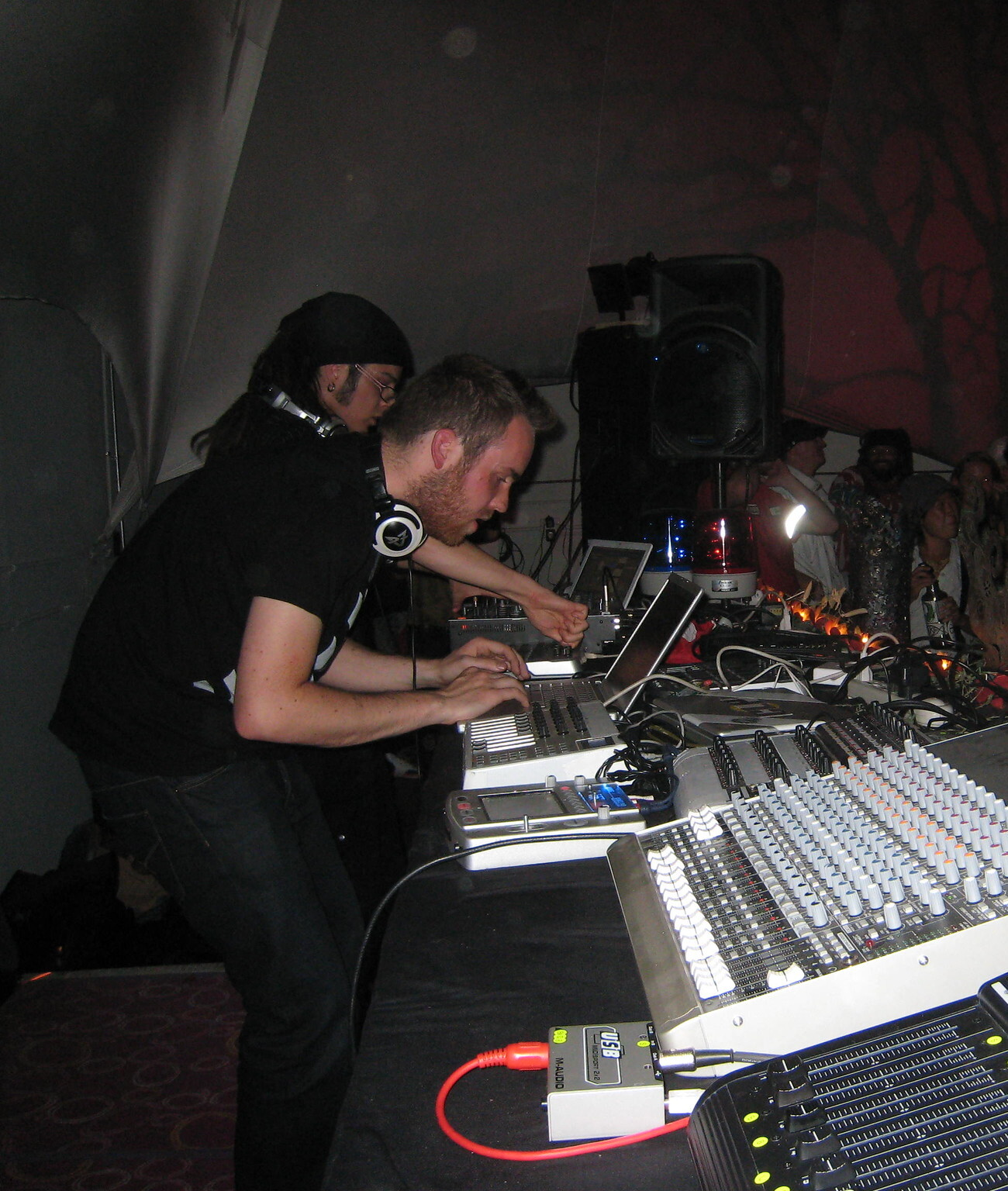

Background information
- Born: Alexander Dennis
- Origin: San Francisco, California, U.S.
- Occupations: Record producer, DJ
- Years active: 2007-present
- Member of: Shades
- Website: eprombeats.com

Alexander Dennis better known by his stage name Eprom (stylised as EPROM) is an American electronic music producer and DJ from San Francisco, based in Portland, Oregon. His musical style spans a range of genres including dubstep, electronica, drum and bass and acid house.

His name was inspired by the EPROM memory chip, which was used by synthesizer manufacturer Oberheim Electronics in their earlier models.

== Early life ==
Eprom first explored music at age nine with collection of cassette tapes given to him by his mother who worked at the music library for Dartmouth College in New Hampshire. The first piece of music he bought for himself was Guns N' Roses' Use Your Illusion II. Later he became a fan of punk rock and alternative bands including Minor Threat, Primus and Nirvana. His dad worked as a stockbroker, and also played bass in bands throughout his whole life, which provided further musical inspiration.

Prior to his career in music, Eprom worked as a full-time graphic designer and web designer for a startup company.

Eprom first began producing music at age 13 on both Rebirth and Sony Acid Music software.

== Career ==
Early in his career, Eprom released various EPs and singles across several independent labels including Additech Records where his debut EP 64 Bytes was released.

In June 2012, Eprom released his debut album Metahuman on Dutch label Rwina Records. The album was noted for Eprom's sparse approach to American style dubstep, utilizing deep sub basses and silence to create emphasis. The style was described by some as "maximalist rave", with comparisons drawn with the work of Rustie, Lone and James Blake. The album was soon followed up with Halflife in 2013.

In 2016, Eprom was assaulted by a member of the crowd at Shambhala music festival. The attacker reportedly punched Eprom, placed him into a chokehold and bit him. The incident did not result in serious injuries.

In 2018, Eprom revisited one of his earlier concepts, a 2010 track titled "Humanoid", with the release of "Humanoid 2.0" in collaboration with Zeke Beats on Noisia's record label Division Recordings.

Eprom's 2019 extended play Aikon EP was released on Deadbeats on November 12 2019. The release featured collaborations with G Jones. Critics noted the experimental approach on the record.

Eprom's third studio album Syntheism was released on June 9 2023, and was accompanied with a full visual live show. The album was inspired by a shift in Eprom's perspective on club music as a result of the COVID-19 lockdowns, and from interviews by Telefon Tel Aviv. He stated that the album signified a return to his influences and can not be tied down to one particular genre. Eprom intended for the album to evoke dystopian technological themes. Accompanying the release was a live concert titled "Syntheism Robotics" at Mission Ballroom in Denver. The concert featured motion-control robots, with the position and rotation programming created by Eprom himself based on software written by the manufacturer. The robotic control units were synchronized with Eprom's Ableton Live project.

=== Collaborations ===
==== G Jones ====
In recent years, Eprom has collaborated with fellow bass music producer G Jones, releasing a mixtape titled Disk Doctors, EPs Acid Disk and Acid Disk 2, as well as regularly performing together at events. The duo released the EP Disk Utility in 2025.

==== Shades ====
Eprom has collaborated with drum and bass producer Alix Perez as Shades since 2015. The duo released their debut EP Shades EP that year on Alpha Pup Records. Shades have since released two studio albums and three EPs. Their musical style focusses on experimentation and deconstruction of typical bass music sound design, and takes inspiration from a variety of music styles including footwork, rave, industrial and g-funk.

== Musical style ==
Eprom's musical style has been described by many as "experimental". He often produces with a varied sound palette incorporating deep sub-bass, chiptune synthesizers and intentional use of silence. He has stated that he is often looking to expand his technical skillset and develop new techniques within his music production.

Although many of his releases are categorized as dubstep, he has drawn influences from a wide range of genres including electronica, drum and bass, techno, acid house and hip-hop.

Similarities to his technical and artistic approach have been drawn to other experimental bass music artists such as G Jones and Alix Perez.

== Discography ==
=== Studio albums ===
==== As Eprom ====
- Metahuman — 2012, Rwina Records
- Halflife — 2013, Rwina Records
- Syntheism — 2023, Square Records

==== With Alix Perez as Shades ====
- In Praise of Darkness — 2018, Deadbeats
- From A Vein — 2022, 1985 Music

=== Extended plays ===
==== As Eprom ====
- 64 Bytes — 2007, Additech Records
- Humanoid EP — 2010
- Pipe Dream EP — 2010
- Samurai — 2016
- Pineapple — 2017
- Acid Disk (with G Jones) — 2017, Illusory Records
- Drone Warfare — 2017, 1985 Music
- Aikon — 2019, Deadbeats
- Acid Disk 2 (with G Jones) — 2022, Illusory Records
- Tracks from the Vault — 2025, Square Records
- Disk Utility (with G Jones) — 2025, Illusory records

==== With Alix Perez as Shades ====
- Shades — 2015, Alpha Pup Records
- Powers of Two — 2016
- The Lower World — 2025, Alpha Pup Records
