= Medison =

Swedish consulting company

MecAdemi
- Formation: Established in March, 2020
- Type: Social Entrepreneurship, Education
- Region served: Sweden
- Official language: English, Other (All)
- Owner: Valdi Ivancic (Medison Group, CEO)
- Key people: Ravi Margasahayam (NASA), Ecem Tuğlan, Vanshika Dhawan, James Brocka, M. Özgür Seydibeyoğlu, Ayşe Meriç Yazıcı, Gladston Joseph
- Website: www.mecademi.com

Medison Group is a Swedish consulting company registered in the UK, established in 1995 in Jönköping, Sweden.

== MecAdemi platform ==
MecAdemi is a free social learning platform. It was founded by Medison in March 2020 and officially launched on 6 April 2020.

== Medison Celebrity ==
The announced computer had a 14-inch (35.5 cm) WXGA screen, an Intel Celeron processor at 1.5 GHz, 256MB of DDR333/400 RAM, a 40GB hard drive, VIA PN800 integrated graphics, a CD/DVD Combo drive and 802.11g wireless networking. It would ship with the open-source Fedora Linux distribution and an unspecified office application suite for the price of $150.

The first orders were expected to begin shipping in August 2007, according to Medison CEO Valdi Ivancic however they did not materialise. On July 27, 2007, Medison reported that its e-mail system had failed due to heavy traffic, and stated that the company offers a full refund for undelivered orders.

On September 12, 2Checkout.com, the company that handles payments for Medison, announced that it would begin refunding customers for undelivered orders. On September 20, Medison's account had been suspended until further notice.

== Criticism ==
The low price of the Medison Celebrity had raised concerns that the computer may be a fraud. In addition, the physical appearance of the hardware was reported to be identical to a product from Taiwanese manufacturer Clevo. On the Medison website, the copyright disclaimer was identical to that of computer manufacturer Apple. Also, the site initially contained an unauthorized advertisement from Swedish telecom operator Tele2. Tele2 representative Thomas Ekman said his company had not purchased any space on the website. Robert Klanjack, Scandinavian CEO of Medison, had no comments when asked by Swedish financial site E24, stating only that Medison will explain itself in an upcoming press event. At the press conference held in Stockholm, Sweden on August 1, 2007, at which the computer was shown to Swedish press, the manufacturer and serial number information had been removed from the case, to further add to the belief that it may be vaporware. Ivancic asserted that the computer will be available and that most of the revenues will be generated from advertisements on the Medison website and not the sales of Medison Celebrity itself. Support will, according to Ivancic, be handled by electronics service company InfoCare, but InfoCare representative Anna Rosander claims there is no such agreement yet.

Ivancic claims to have taken part in the design process of IKEA furniture, and be responsible for the color schemes of the first Apple iMacs. Ivancic also announced that he will be running for the prime minister post of Sweden at the next election.

On August 9, 2007, Medison issued a press release, stating that it would no longer talk to media. According to the press release, negative media attention regarding the controversial Medison Celebrity had been harmful to company relations. It also stated that it would deliver the product as promised, which as of September 2007 it has not.

On September 10, 2007, Medison CEO Valdi Ivancic issued another press release, dismissing recent criticism in media as lies. In addition, the Medison website had been taken down only days before. The company stated this was a temporary technical error, however a representative from its web hotel Manufrog claimed the account had been misconfigured and later suspended, as reported by a blogger. Ivancic dismissed all accusations of the company being a fraud, and speculations of the website downtime being Medison's escape with early buyers' money. Due to great demand, the company has experienced logistical problems, but will deliver the Medison Celebrity, according to Ivancic. The press release encouraged Medison customers not to believe in media speculations, stating that Medison is a serious company with intentions to deliver.

However, on September 13, 2007, 2CheckOut announced that customers would be refunded within 7–10 days. According to 2CheckOut, customers that still wanted the computer would have to place a new order.
