= Goofball (EP) =

EP by Moody Good
- Released: 15 March 2019
- Recorded: 2017–2018
- Genre: Dubstep
- Length: 16:31
- Label: Never Say Die
- Producers: Eddie Jefferys; Hydraulix

Moody Good chronology
| This Is the Investigation (2015) | Goofball (2019) |

Goofball is the second extended play by English music producer and sound designer Eddie Jefferys, known as his stage name Moody Good. It was released by English record label Never Say Die Records on 15 March 2019. It contains four songs, including a collaboration with Australian electronic music producer Hydraulix.

== Background and release ==
The song "Sixtysixty" was previously only known as an ID, debuting two years prior to release. Most of the songs present on Goofball started production near the end of 2017 and throughout 2018, with most being produced based around "Sixtysixty". Various singles and collaborations were based around the song, some of which were not released as part of the extended play.

The track "Squeeky Clean" was produced as a collaboration with Australian electronic music producer Hydraulix. The song was produced three months after the birth of Jefferys' daughter, a period of time which he took time off producing music to look after her. Jefferys got in touch with Hydraulix and they started sending ideas back and forth, eventually producing a number of collaborative tracks, including what would become "Squeeky Clean".

On 15 March 2019, the extended play was released as a digital download on international digital stores through English record label Never Say Die, as well as being released through various music streaming services. It was released on Never Say Die after being asked by SkisM, the co-founder and A&R, to release music with them.

== Critical reception ==
Goofball was well received by most critics. Brian Bonavoglia of ThisSongSlaps praised the extended play, writing that Jefferys continued to push the dubstep genre forward and that it was a "must-listen of any avid bass music lover." Writing for Run the Trap, Omar Serrano noted the extended play as having an "unusual yet insane take on bass music", describing Jefferys' style on the extended play as "gritty." Dancing Astronaut's Jessica Mao praised the sound design found on the song "Sixtysixty", calling it complex and "high-filth." Writing for Bassrush, Chris Muniz reviewed the song "Squeaky Clean", stating that the song rode the "fine line between exquisite minimalism and straight up rinse-out." Jordan Mafi of Nest HQ noted the song "Jimmytics" as having "distorted basses, chopped-up vocals, and razor-sharp stabs" and is sure to "tickle the audiophile in you."

== Track listing ==
Digital download
| No. | Title | Producer(s) | Length |
|---|---|---|---|
| 1. | "Sixtysixty" | Moody Good | 4:23 |
| 2. | "Squeeky Clean" (with Hydraulix) | Moody Good; Hydraulix | 4:09 |
| 3. | "Anti - Acid" | Moody Good | 3:48 |
| 4. | "Jimmytics" | Moody Good | 4:11 |
| Total length: | | | 16:31 |

== Release history ==
| Region | Date | Format | Label | Ref. |
|---|---|---|---|---|
| Worldwide | 15 March 2019 | Digital download | Never Say Die | |
