= The Uprising (album) =

Studio album by Foreign Beggars
- Released: 1 October 2012
- Recorded: 2009–2012
- Genre: Hip hop, grime, dubstep
- Length: 58:37 (Beatport Edition); 53:51 (iTunes Edition)
- Label: Mau5trap
- Producer: Alix Perez; Bare Noize; Blue Daisy; BURNS; Moody Good; kidkanevil; Knife Party; Nasty Nasty; Salva; Starkey; Tommy Lee

Foreign Beggars chronology
| United Colours Of Beggattron (2009) | The Uprising (2012) | I Am Legion (2013) |

Singles from The Uprising
- 1. "Palm of My Hand" Released: 20 April 2012; 2. "Flying to Mars" Released: 2 July 2012; 3. "Anywhere" Released: 27 August 2012; 4. "Apex" Released: 17 September 2012

The Uprising is the fourth studio album by English hip hop group Foreign Beggars. It was released on 1 October 2012 through Mau5trap. Most of the mixing was done by Wez Clarke.

The group completed their nine-date headline Uprising Tour in 2013, off the back of the album release, supported by True Tiger and ƱZ. The original dates were from 9 to 19 October 2012, but the tour was postponed due to unforeseen reasons.

A remix of "Crep Hype" by MRK1 was released as a free download on 22 December 2012. "See the Light" feature as soundtrack on the video game by EA Sports, FIFA 13 as well as the Ministry of Sound compilation Addicted To Bass 2013.

== Singles ==
- "Palm of My Hand" is the album's lead single. It is produced by kidkanevil. It was released on 20 April 2012, and given out as a free download on SoundCloud for a limited time.
- "Flying to Mars" is the second single from the album. It features vocals from Donae'o and it is produced by Alix Perez. It was released on 2 July 2012, featuring remixes from 12th Planet, August Jakobsen and Planas. The Ruckspin & Medison remix features on the album but not on the EP. The original mix also features on the UKF Bass Culture 2 compilation album.
- "Anywhere" is the third single from the album. It features Hackney vocalist D.Ablo and was produced by Moody Good, former member of 16bit. It was released on 27 August 2012.
- "Apex" is the fourth single from the album. It was produced by Knife Party, and a remix from Dirtyphonics features as a B-side to the single. It was released on 17 September 2012. The track also features on the Sound of Dubstep 5 and The Annual 2013 compilation albums by Ministry of Sound.

== Track listing ==
| No. | Title | Producer(s) | Length |
|---|---|---|---|
| 1. | "Amen" | BURNS | 3:44 |
| 2. | "Apex" | Knife Party | 3:40 |
| 3. | "Crep Hype" | Salva; Nasty Nasty | 2:44 |
| 4. | "We Does This" | Alix Perez | 2:58 |
| 5. | "Mind's Eye" (featuring Tommy Lee) | Millions Like Us | 4:25 |
| 6. | "Flying to Mars" (featuring Donae'o) | Alix Perez | 3:53 |
| 7. | "Anywhere" (featuring D.Ablo) | Moody Good | 5:36 |
| 8. | "Goon Bags" | Blue Daisy | 3:00 |
| 9. | "Palm of My Hand" | kidkanevil | 3:08 |
| 10. | "Working Angles" | kidkanevil | 2:55 |
| 11. | "Never Stop" (featuring Chrom3) | Starkey | 3:45 |
| 12. | "See the Light" (head on FIFA 13 soundtrack) | Bare Noize | 4:47 |

Digital bonus track
| No. | Title | Producer(s) | Length |
|---|---|---|---|
| 13. | "Flying to Mars" (12th Planet's Martian Trapstep Remix) | Alix Perez | 4:49 |

Beatport bonus tracks
| No. | Title | Producer(s) | Length |
|---|---|---|---|
| 14. | "Goon Bags" (ƱZ Remix) | Blue Daisy | 3:37 |
| 15. | "Flying to Mars" (Ruckspin & Medison Remix) | Alix Perez | 5:14 |

iTunes Store bonus track
| No. | Title | Producer(s) | Length |
|---|---|---|---|
| 14. | "Apex" (Dirtyphonics Remix) | Knife Party | 4:07 |

== Chart performance ==
=== Weekly charts ===
| Chart (2013) | Peak position |
|---|---|
| UK R&B Albums (OCC) | 39 |

== Release history ==
| Region | Date | Format | Label |
|---|---|---|---|
| Worldwide | 1 October 2012 | Digital download | Mau5trap |
