= FabricLive.40 =

Compilation album by Noisia
- Released: June 2008
- Genre: Drum and bass
- Label: Fabric
- Producer: Noisia

Noisia chronology
FabricLive.40 (2008)	Split the Atom (2010)

FabricLive chronology
FabricLive.39 (2008)	FabricLive.40 (2008)	FabricLive.41 (2008)

FabricLive.40 is a 2008 mix album by Dutch electronic dance music trio Noisia. The album was released as part of the FabricLive Mix Series.

== Track listing ==
1. Noisia & Phace - Cannonball - Vision Recordings
2. The Qemists - Stompbox (Spor Remix) - Ninja Tune
3. Phace - Alive (Dub) - Phace
4. The Upbeats - Anti Social - Cyanide Recordings
5. Break - Splash Step - Quarantine
6. Noisia - Diplodocus (Dub) - Noisia
7. Spor - Claret's March - Lifted
8. Noisia - Head Knot (Dub) - Noisia
9. Noisia - The Tide - Vision Recordings
10. Icicle - Nowhere (Dub) - Icicle
11. Noisia & Phace - The Feed - Subtitles
12. Sabre - Global (Dub) - Subtitles
13. Phace - Cold Champagne (Dub) - Phace
14. The Upbeats - Panic - Subtitles
15. Noisia & Black Sun Empire - Infusion - Vision Recordings
16. Noisia - Split The Atom (Instrumental) - Division Recordings
17. Spor - Mordez Moi - Division Recordings
18. Noisia - Seven Stitches - Division Recordings
19. Noisia - Brown Time - Division Recordings
20. Noisia - Stigma (Dub) - Noisia
21. Moby - Alice (Noisia Remix) - EMI
22. Noisia - Concussion - Vision Recordings
23. Noisia - Façade (VIP) - Ram Records
24. Ed Rush & Optical - Medicine (Matrix Remix) - Virus
25. Noisia & The Upbeats - Mudslide - Vision Recordings
26. Misanthrop - Viperfish (VIP) - Subtitles
27. Noisia - Crank (Dub) - Noisia
28. Noisia & The Upbeats - Creep Out - Non Vogue
29. Noisia - Square Feet - Division Recordings
