= Closer (Noisia album) =

Studio album by Noisia
- Released: 28 April 2022
- Label: VISION
- Producers: Martijn van Sonderen; Nik Roos; Thijs de Vlieger

Noisia chronology
Outer Edges (2016)	Closer (2022)

Closer is the fourth and final studio album by Dutch electronic music group, Noisia. Closer was released on 28 April 2022 by Noisia's own record label Vision Recordings.

== Background ==
In 2019, after announcing that the Noisia project would cease at the end of 2020, the group decided to delay their split due to the ongoing COVID-19 pandemic, to allow for a proper farewell tour. This led to the trio working on a final album together.

The name is a reference to the group's view that "In the end, we didn't manage to figure things out. But we did get closer".

== Reception ==
The album was generally received well critically, with critics praising the soundscapes, production and songwriting. The album was the runner up as "Best Album" in the Drum&BassArena Awards 2022.

The album charted at 97 in the Official Album Downloads Chart in the UK.

== Track listing ==
No.	Title	Length
1.	"Three (Intro)"	0:53
2.	"Nova (with Camo & Krooked)"	4:36
3.	"Shibuya Pet Store (with The Upbeats)"	4:50
4.	"Shift (with IMANU)"	4:20
5.	"Horizon (with Skrillex, Thys, Sleepnet)"	5:21
6.	"Cleansing (with Former)"	4:30
7.	"Foundations (with Mefjus)"	3:54
8.	"Scrapped"	3:04
9.	"Shutters"	1:54
10.	"Halcyon (with The Upbeats)"	6:05
11.	"Wordless (with Halogenix)"	5:46
12.	"Told You"	1:20
13.	"Dzjengis (with Two Fingers)"	5:37
14.	"Pleasure Model (with Former)"	4:10
15.	"Deep Down (with Phace)"	4:52
16.	"Simplon (with Posij)"	3:43
17.	"Caps Lock (with Black Sun Empire)"	4:40
18.	"Supersonic (VIP) (with Skrillex, josh pan, Dylan Brady)"	3:26
19.	"The Hole Pt. 1"	3:48
20.	"Closer"	2:02
