= Tasha Baxter =

South African singer-songwriter (born 1981)

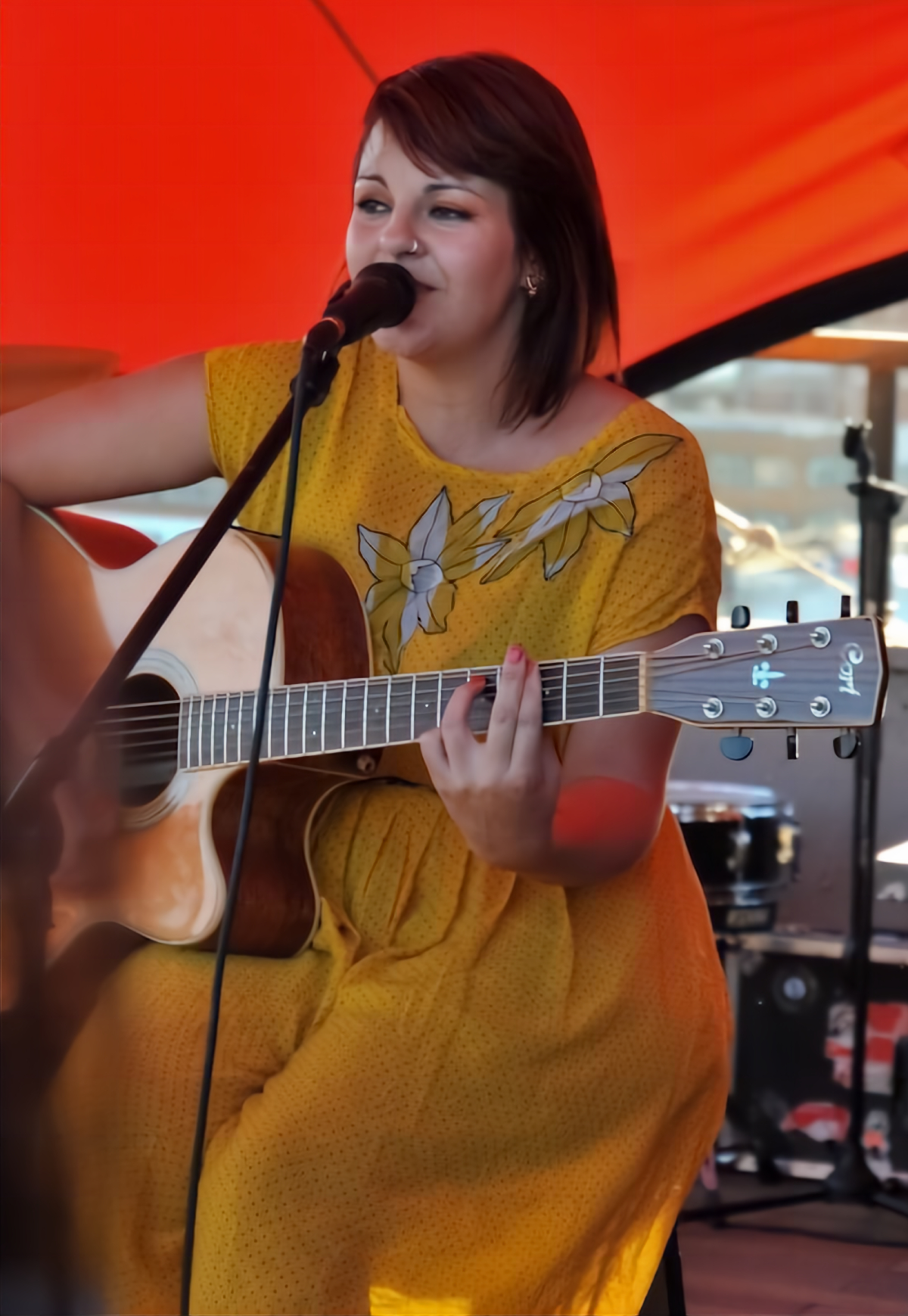
- Baxter performing at 12 Decades Hotel, Maboneng, 2011

Background information
- Born: Tasha Baxter; Cape Town, South Africa
- Genres: Pop; electropop; drum & bass; electronic dance music
- Occupations: Singer; songwriter; DJ; record producer
- Instruments: Vocals; guitar; bass; drums; piano
- Years active: 2002–present
- Labels: Universal Music Group; EMI South Africa; Monstercat; Mau5trap; Polyoto

Tasha Baxter is a South African singer-songwriter. Baxter has 5 South African Music Awards nominations and won "Best Pop Album" and "Newcomer of the Year" for her album "Colour of Me".

Baxter is most well known in South Africa for her debut solo studio album "Colour of Me" on EMI. Internationally Baxter became prominent for her collaborations in the electronic dance music and drum and bass scenes. Multiple of Baxter's collaborations reached number one or top positions on the Beatport charts, such as "Snowblind" with Au5 and "Cloudburn" with Feed Me, and on the Top 40 UK singles charts with "In the Beginning" with Roger Goode.

== Early life ==
Baxter was born in Cape Town, South Africa. She learnt to play piano at a young age and sang in the school choir. At 12 years old, her father taught her how to play guitar on steel twelve string guitar. She played in local bands as a teenager while developing her musical talents, playing in a Christian metal band as well as singing and performing with local drum and bass DJs such as Counterstrike.

== Career ==
=== 2002–2006: In the Beginning ===
When Baxter was 18 she met and became good friends with South African DJ and radio personality Roger Goode. This led to their breakthrough in the international music charts with "In the Beginning" in 2002. "In the Beginning" made the local radio Top 40 charts and was number one on Pete Tong's Essential Mix radio show and later saw remixes by Ferry Corsten and Gabriel & Dresden.

The Ferry Corsten remix reached number 33 on the UK Singles Charts.

=== 2006–2009: Colour of Me ===
Baxter continued performing in the dance music scene and playing at local drum and bass events. She then met Noisia in 2006 and went to Holland to work on her solo album with the Dutch trio. The album was written by Baxter and her co-writer Andre Scheepers. The album was signed to EMI South African division.

'Colour of Me' was released in 2007 on CD only and did not have a digital and world-wide release until 2020 provided by Universal Music Group.

Baxter toured extensively throughout this time, performing at the biggest local festivals such as Oppikoppi, Rocking the Daisies, RAMFest. The singles from the album, "Who's Sorry Now", "The Journey", "Useless" and "Fade To Black" made the South African radio top charts list.

"The Journey" and "Don't Believe in Love" appeared in the 2009 South African film, "White Wedding".

The "Colour of Me" album was nominated for 4 South African Music Awards and won 2 with 'Best Newcomer' and 'Best Pop Album (English)'.

In 2008, Baxter appeared on "Cooking Magic" season 2, by Urban Brew Studios, SABC, a cooking show aimed towards children with celebrity guests as entertainers.

At the 15th annual SAMA awards, Loyiso's "Blow your Mind" featuring Tasha Baxter was nominated for MTN Record of the year, adding to Baxter's SAMA nominations.

In October 2009 Tasha Baxter appeared on "Tropika Island of Treasure" season 2 reality gameshow on national television alongside other South African celebrities such as Trevor Noah, Loyiso Bala and was hosted by DJ Fresh.

=== 2010–2013: Ebb and Flow, Cloudburn, Strange Behaviour ===
Baxter collaborated with Jon Gooch (Feed Me, Spor) on numerous songs throughout this period. They released the drum & bass tracks "As I Need You" and "Overdue" as Spor and the dubstep tracks "Cloudburn", "Strange Behaviour" and "Ebb & Flow". "Cloudburn" reached number one on Beatport dubstep chart and was released on Deadmau5's label mau5trap.

'Ebb & Flow' was released on Feed Me's debut studio album 'Calamari Tuesday' and the album reached No. 14 on the UK Dance Albums Chart. 'Ebb & Flow' also appeared in the British TV show, "Youngers". In 2011, Baxter independently released her 'Ebb & Flow' EP which was produced by Jon which contained the original songs "Ebb & Flow", "Bikes" and "Fake the Fall".

=== 2014–2019: Snowblind, Bigger than Me ===
In 2014, Baxter met Au5 and the song '"Snowblind" was created. Tasha wrote and performed vocals for the song and it was released on Canadian electronic record label Monstercat. "Snowblind" reached number one on the Beatport dubstep charts and also appeared on the American TV show, "So You Think You Can Dance". The following year, she independently released "Bigger than Me" with Au5 as producer which has over one million streams on Spotify.

In 2016, she was featured again on Monstercat with Tut Tut Child on the song "Just A Dream".

In 2017 the song, "The Journey" from Baxter's album "Colour Of Me" was sampled in Lil Wayne's "Hittas" on his "Tha Carter V" studio album.

During this period, Baxter continued with collaborations and recordings in the Electronic dance music and Drum & Bass with releases such as "Saviour" by Flux Pavilion on Circus Records and "The Wall" by Abis & Signal/Imanu and with Minesweepa on "FACES" and "Stargate" with Au5 on his "Divinorum" album.

=== 2020–present: Polyoto ===
In 2020, Baxter started streaming on Twitch during lockdown. During her streams she and her Twitch community created the collaborative album 'FULL MOON FLEX' which was released in 2021 by her record label Polyoto Records. In 2021, Baxter collaborated with Feed Me again, performing 'Reckless' on his self titled studio album 'Feed Me' released on Sotto Voce. Later in 2021, Baxter collaborated with Moore Kismet on their song 'Call of the Unicorn' released on Thrive.

In 2022, Baxter collaborated with Kill the Noise and Bro Safari releasing the single "As Above So Below" via Polyoto Records. The single would also contain the "Band of Insanity" remix which was the top voted community made remix. In 2023, Baxter would collaborate again with Kill the Noise and long time collaborator Feed Me on the single "Mirage" on Kill the Noise's album "Hollow World".

Later in October 2023, Baxter would return to Monstercat after 9 years releasing "Endgame" with Rebel Scum.

== Discography ==
=== Studio albums ===
Title	Label	Notes
"Colour Of Me"	EMI South Africa/ Universal Music Group	Genre: Pop South African Music Awards: Best Pop Album, Best Newcomer Producer: Noisia Physical release: 3 March 2007 Digital release: 25 November 2020
"FULL MOON FLEX"	Polyoto	Genre: Drum and bass, dubstep, electronica Mastering Engineer: Dan Smith Digital release: 19 November 2021

=== Selected singles as lead artist ===
Title	Year	Label
"The Journey"	2007	EMI
"Fade To Black"	2007	EMI
"Ebb & Flow"	2011	Independent
"Bigger Than Me"	2015	Independent
