= Split the Atom =

Studio album by Noisia
- Released: 5 April 2010
- Recorded: 2007–2010
- Genre: Drum and bass; electro house; neurofunk; breakbeat; IDM
- Length: 56:42
- Label: Vision; Division; mau5trap
- Producer: Noisia

Noisia chronology
FabricLive.40 (2008)	Split the Atom (2010)	I Am Legion (2013)

Singles from Split the Atom
- 1. "Machine Gun" Released: 8 March 2010; 2. "Split the Atom" Released: 25 July 2010; 3. "Alpha Centauri" Released: 29 November 2010

Singles from Split the Atom (Special Edition)
- 1. "Tommy's Theme" Released: 26 September 2011; 2. "Could This Be" Released: 21 November 2011

Split the Atom is the debut studio album by Dutch drum and bass trio Noisia. The album was released on 5 April 2010 as a full-length CD as well as two double 12" EPs; the Vision EP includes four drum and Bass songs whilst the Division EP includes four electro house/breakbeat songs.

On 27 February 2012 Noisia released a special edition of Split The Atom on deadmau5's acclaimed label mau5trap. The first disc is the full-length original album while the second disc is a remix album with one original track, "Could This Be", that later become a single released through mau5trap.

== Background ==
The singles from this album include "Machine Gun" (released 8 March 2010), which also includes remixes by Spor, Amon Tobin and 16bit, "Split the Atom" (released 25 July 2010), which has been remixed by Bar9 and Ed Rush & Optical, and "Alpha Centauri", which has been remixed by Excision & Datsik.

Some of the songs were previously released in various forms, "Stigma" was released in 2008 on Vision Recordings and "Diplodocus" was released in 2009 on Quarantine. Both "Stigma" and "Diplodocus" along with "Split the Atom", "Headknot" and "Square Feet" all feature on Noisia's FabricLive.40 released in June 2008. "Machine Gun" has also been released as part of Wipeout HD Fury's soundtrack and appeared in a trailer for the video game Far Cry 3.

== Track listing ==
=== Original release ===
CD

No.	Title	Length
1.	"Machine Gun"	4:05
2.	"My World" (featuring Giovanca)	4:52
3.	"Shitbox"	0:57
4.	"Split the Atom"	5:42
5.	"Thursday"	3:45
6.	"Leakage"	1:32
7.	"Hand Gestures" (featuring Joe Seven)	3:10
8.	"Headknot"	1:32
9.	"Red Heat"	3:27
10.	"Shellshock" (featuring Foreign Beggars)	3:46
11.	"Whiskers"	1:10
12.	"Alpha Centauri"	3:59
13.	"Soul Purge" (featuring Foreign Beggars)	3:00
14.	"Diplodocus"	3:01
15.	"Paper Doll"	1:06
16.	"Dystopia"	0:57
17.	"Sunhammer" (featuring Amon Tobin)	3:48
18.	"Stigma"	3:25
19.	"Square Feet"	3:28

Bonus tracks
No.	Title	Length
20.	"Browntime"	5:18
21.	"Peacock Strut"	1:51

Vinyl

Vision EP
No.	Title	Length
1.	"Shellshock" (featuring Foreign Beggars)	3:46
2.	"Sunhammer" (featuring Amon Tobin)	3:48
3.	"Thursday"	3:45
4.	"Hand Gestures" (featuring Joe Seven)	3:10

Division EP
No.	Title	Length
1.	"Split the Atom"	5:42
2.	"Alpha Centauri"	3:59
3.	"Machine Gun"	4:05
4.	"Red Heat"	3:27

=== Special edition ===
Disc 1
No.	Title	Length
1.	"Machine Gun"	4:05
2.	"My World" (featuring Giovanca)	4:52
3.	"Shitbox"	0:57
4.	"Split the Atom"	5:42
5.	"Thursday"	3:45
6.	"Leakage"	1:32
7.	"Hand Gestures" (featuring Joe Seven)	3:10
8.	"Headknot"	1:32
9.	"Red Heat"	3:27
10.	"Shellshock" (featuring Foreign Beggars)	3:46
11.	"Whiskers"	1:10
12.	"Alpha Centauri"	3:59
13.	"Soul Purge" (featuring Foreign Beggars)	3:00
14.	"Diplodocus"	3:01
15.	"Paper Doll"	1:06
16.	"Dystopia"	0:57
17.	"Sunhammer" (featuring Amon Tobin)	3:48
18.	"Stigma"	3:25
19.	"Square Feet"	3:28

Disc 2
No.	Title	Length
1.	"Tommy's Theme"	4:40
2.	"Could This Be"	4:05
3.	"Stigma" (Neosignal Remix)	6:23
4.	"My World" (Posij Remix)	5:06
5.	"Split the Atom" (Kito Remix)	4:14
6.	"Tommy's Theme" (Loadstar Remix)	4:07
7.	"Soul Purge" (Current Value Remix)	4:58
8.	"Diplodocus" (Kill The Noise Remix)	2:44
9.	"Tommy's Theme" (Munchi's Fear is Weakness Remix)	3:33
10.	"Thursday" (Black Sun Empire Remix)	4:18
11.	"Diplodocus" (The Upbeats Remix)	4:35
12.	"Alpha Centauri" (Excision & Datsik Remix)	4:49
13.	"Machine Gun" (16bit Remix)	6:00

== Critical reception ==
Split the Atom received critical acclaim from critics. Skiddle gave the album 4 out of 5 stars, saying "Split The Atom works to satisfy even the most fastidious of music fans."

Sputnik Music reviewer Deviant gave the album a 4.5 out of 5 stars, saying "Split The Atom is poised to destroy the lives of clubbers worldwide and invade the senses of anyone brave enough to invest ample time in it."

== Personnel ==
Noisia

- Martijn van Sonderen
- Nik Roos
- Thijs de Vlieger

Guests

- Amon Tobin
- Giovanca Ostiana
- Joe Seven
- Orifice Vulgatron (Foreign Beggars)
- Metropolis (Foreign Beggars)
- DJ Nonames (Foreign Beggars)
- Dag Nabbit (Foreign Beggars)

Producers

- Martijn van Sonderen
- Nik Roos
- Thijs de Vlieger
