= E24 Näringsliv =

Discontinued online business newspaper in Sweden

E24 Näringsliv was a Swedish online business newspaper based in Stockholm, Sweden. It was previously named Näringsliv24 (N24, Business24), but changed to E24 in 2006. It started as N24 on 4 October 2005, and was owned by Svenska Dagbladet (60%) and Aftonbladet (40%). One of the editors-in-chief was Per Lundsjö.

E24 Näringsliv exchanged material with SvD.se and Aftonbladet.se, and had a job recruitment site, Jobb24.se.

In 2006 a Norwegian version of the newspaper, E24 Næringsliv, was launched. E24.no was owned by Aftenposten (60%) and Verdens Gang (40%). Like the owners of E24.se, both Aftenposten and Verdens Gang are owned by the Norwegian media company Schibsted.

In 2012 E24 Näringsliv was replaced by Nliv.se.
