= Alix Perez =

- Birth name: Alix Depauw
- Also known as: Alter:Native; ARP.101
- Genres: Drum and bass, liquid funk, dubstep
- Occupations: DJ; record producer
- Labels: 1985 Music, Shogun Audio, Exit Records, Liquid V, Horizons, Fokuz, Soul:R, Creative Source
- Website: https://alixperez.bandcamp.com/

Alix Depauw, better known by the stage name Alix Perez, is a drum and bass DJ and producer, originally from Charleroi, Belgium. Based in New Zealand, his music is sometimes characterised as liquid funk amongst other labels. He founded the record label and clothing imprint 1985 Music in 2016.

== Biography ==
Starting to DJ at the age of 14 and producing at 17, Perez has collaborated with other artists such as Jenna G, Redeyes, Sabre and Specific. His inspirations include artists such as Calibre, Marcus Intalex, Ill logic & DJ Raf, Artificial Intelligence and dBridge.

Represented by Coda, he regularly played out in London and around Europe prior to his relocation to New Zealand in autumn 2020. He describes his DJ style as, "eclectic. I play generally deep but dip into various aspects of drum & bass. I like to read the crowd and let the music breathe. I find mixing in the right musical keys essential. I basically see it as a journey."

Perez's tunes are played regularly on radio shows such as BBC 1Xtra and he has been doing many mixes for radio and podcast. He receives support from respected DJs and producers such as Bailey, Fabio and Bryan Gee. On one of his BBC shows, Fabio called the Perez song "Forsaken" the best drum and bass track of 2010.

Perez has been featured in popular drum and bass magazines and was on the cover of ATM Magazine in a feature on the "Leaders of the Nu Skool" in the drum and bass genre. He has had coverage in Knowledge Magazine, London-based dance music magazine One Week To Live, and regularly has his releases reviewed by DJ, Mixmag, Knowledge and ATM.

In 2009, Perez released his debut album, 1984, on drum and bass label Shogun Audio. The album features collaborations with Foreign Beggars, Lynx, Truth, Yungun and Spectrasoul among others.

In 2013, Perez released his second studio album, Chroma Chords, through Shogun Audio. It features collaborations with Two Inch Punch, Riko Dan, Foreign Beggars, Jehst, Phace & Misanthrop among others.

Since 2013, Perez has released multiple EPs, many in collaboration with other major artists such as Ivy Lab, Skeptical, Spectrasoul, and most notably Eprom, with whom he has released 4 EPs and an album since 2015 under the name Shades.

Perez also produces other veins of electronic music under the alias ARP 101.

In 2016, Perez founded his record label and clothing imprint 1985 Music, at first primarily focusing on drum & bass, but later expanding to releasing dubstep, halftime, and IDM as well. Artists featured on the label include Perez himself, Skeptical, Spectrasoul, Halogenix, Eprom (both his solo productions and his work with Perez on Shades), and many more. In addition to running the label, Perez also designs the artwork and clothing sold as merchandise.

== Discography ==
=== Studio albums ===
- 1984 (2009)
- Chroma Chords (2013)
- In Praise Of Darkness (with Eprom as Shades) (2018)
- From A Vein (with Eprom as Shades) (2022)
- Hellion (with Headland) (2023)
- Entanglements (2024)

=== Selected extended plays ===
- U EP (2014)
- Shades EP (with Eprom as Shades) (2015)
- Arkestra EP (with Ivy Lab)
- Enchiridion EP (2018)
- Without End EP (2020)
- Gloom EP (2024)
