= Foreign Beggars =

English hip hop and dubstep group

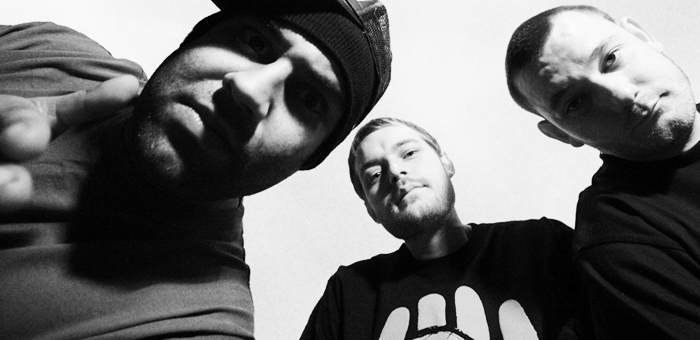

Background information
- Origin: London, England
- Genres: Hip hop; dubstep; drum & bass; electro house; grime
- Years active: 2003–2019
- Labels: Dented; Data; Owsla; Mau5trap; Never Say Die; Monstercat
- Past members: Orifice Vulgatron; Dag Nabbit; DJ Nonames; Metropolis

Foreign Beggars were an English hip hop and dubstep group. Since their formation in 2002, the group's trajectory had seen them evolve from an underground hip hop group to an electronic crossover act. The group consisted of four artists individually known as Orifice Vulgatron (Pavan Mukhi, vocals), Metropolis (Ebow Enyan Graham, vocals), DJ Nonames (James Miller, turntables), and Dag Nabbit (Dag Torgersbraten, producer). Vulgatron and Metropolis combined with Noisia to make the side project and supergroup "I Am Legion". They released their collaborative album I Am Legion on 2 September 2013.

Foreign Beggars made their start producing several singles and albums on their own Dented Records imprint. In 2011 they teamed up with Never Say Die Records on The Harder They Fall EP. Following a diverse series of singles for mau5trap released in 2012, the group released its new album The Uprising on the deadmau5-helmed label. In celebration of the release of the album, Foreign Beggars went on UK and North American tours to showcase their new material in the live arena.

On 9 May 2019, the group announced via Facebook they were to disband after 17 years together, with Mukhi announcing a new solo project, PAV4N, around the same date.

In the early hours of 18 April 2020, during a national COVID-19 lockdown, group member Ebow Enyan 'Metropolis' Graham died in hospital at the age of 41, following a substance-induced psychosis that had led him to fall from the third-storey window of his Clapton flat, resulting in cardiac arrest. In 2025, Graham's former partner reached a settlement with the London Ambulance Service and East London NHS Foundation Trust after they were found to have breached their duty of care by missing multiple opportunities to provide "expert help".

On 29 January 2021, the group's remaining members collaborated with Delhi-based hip hop duo Seedhe Maut and producer Sez on the Beat to release the song "No Enema".

== History ==
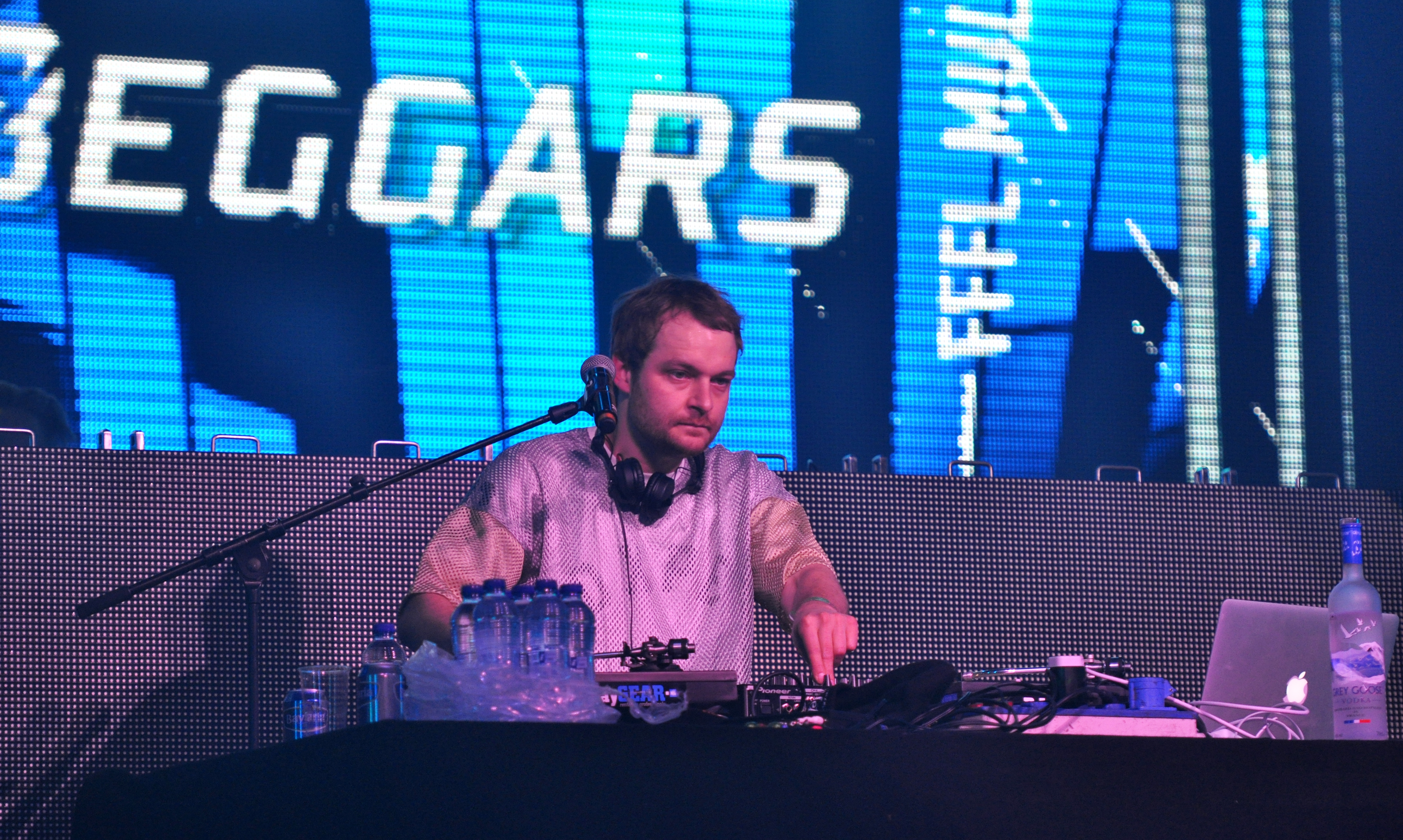
DJ Nonames, Paaspop 2014

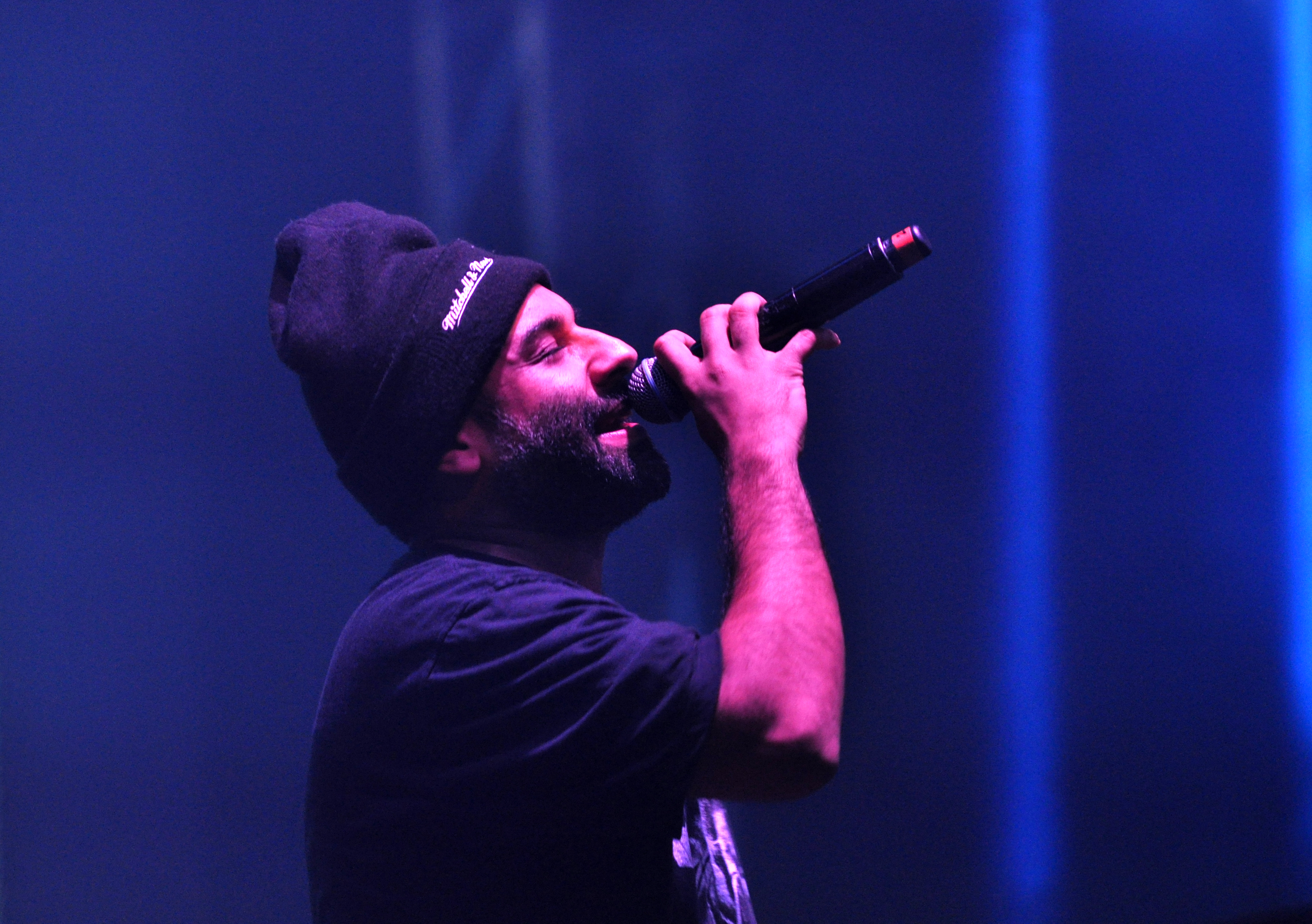
Orifice Vulgatron, Paaspop 2014

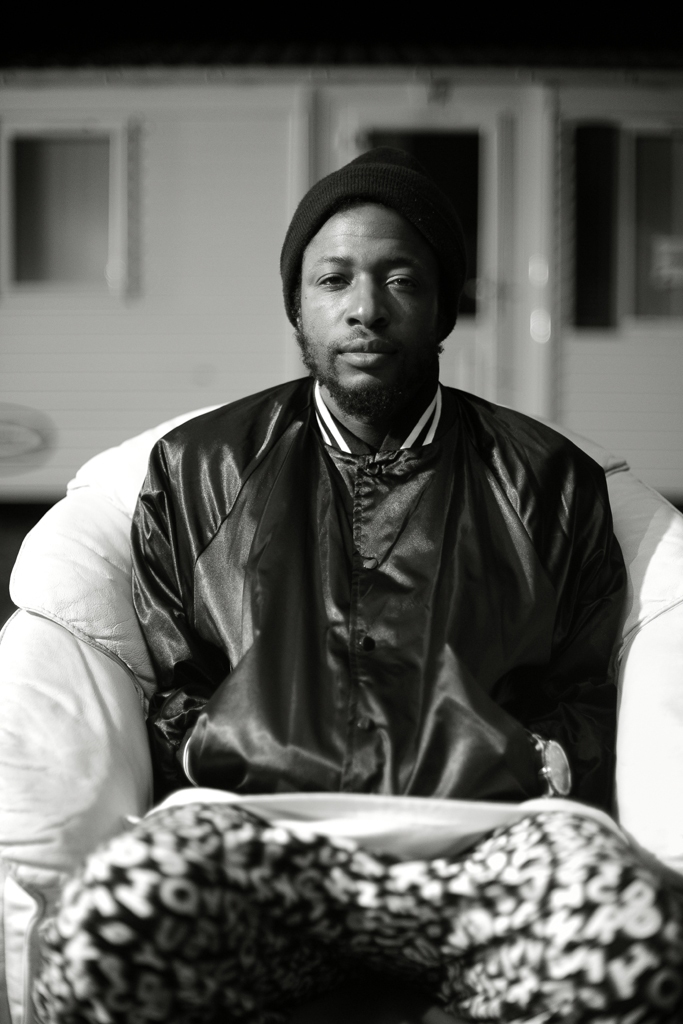
Metropolis - Foreign Beggars. 2013.

Orifice Vulgatron and Dag Nabbit met in Dubai playing in metal, grunge and indie bands as early as 1993. They later formed a group making hip hop in 1996/1997 and soon after started throwing DnB house parties and raves in sports halls and ballrooms. Dag Nabbit moved to Norway in 1998, Orifice Vulgatron to London in 1999, both continued to produce, promote and perform.

DJ Nonames also met Metropolis at university in 2000. They soon joined hip hop and funk band Focused Few and began throwing warehouse parties and touring. Orifice Vulgatron was introduced to Nonames through DJ Gizroc, then part of the Mixologists Crew, whilst working on sound and lighting for "The Wizard of Oz", where Nonames was doing the entire sound with a Technics 1210, a vestax 05 and a "Wizard of Oz" vinyl. By late 2002 Orifice Vulgatron and Dag Nabbit decided to release Foreign Beggars on their own imprint Dented Records and started performing and recording alongside DJ Nonames, Metropolis and beatboxer Shlomo.

== Release history ==
=== Where Did the Sun Go? (01/ Feb 2003) ===
The debut release from Foreign Beggars was a two-track single released on Dented Records. "Where Did the Sun Go?" featured Anik from Dark Circle (defcon/JazzFudge) & Tommy Evans (Y&R productions) and a solo track called Pisstake Pictures by founding members Orifice Vulgatron and Dag Nabbit.

=== Season's Beatings ===
Season's Beatings is the second release from Foreign Beggars in the form of a 3 track EP. The lead track 'Coded Rhythm Talk' features legendary UK rap Group Task Force. Evil Dr hip hop ft Dark Circle & A solo track called Dark Parts from Orifice Vulgatron

=== Asylum Speakers (Nov 2003) ===
On 27 November 2003 the group released their first album Asylum Speakers. The record featured the following guest artists: Kashmere, Graziella, Dr. Syntax, Anik, Tommy Evans, MRX, Carnage, Grim, Finsta, DVS, Skinnyman, Wayne Wonda, Tau Rai, Lena, Farma G, Chester P, Task Force, Shlomo, Ed Skrein, Pye, Nassa, Super Novar and Highbreed. Two videos were released from this album, "Hold On" (featuring Skinnyman & DVS) and "Frosted Perspeks" (featuring Lena), which were also released as double single. The track "Hold On" was remixed by D&B legend Mickey Finn and ERB N Dub and released on Urbanism. "Mind Out" was released as single by Skrein, who was featured on the track, on Dented Records.

=== Bukkake Ski Trip (April 2006) ===
The controversially named Bukkake Ski Trip was released on 3 April 2006. The mixtape is a compilation of previously unheard tracks, vinyl-only releases, bootlegs, collaborations and remixes, mixed together by DJ Nonames. The albums features of range of MCs, DJs and producers including: Wildchild (Lootpack), Dr. Syntax, Skrein, Dark Circle, Kashmere the Iguana Man, DJ Square One, Dubbledge, Supar Novar (Kemet), Big Ben, DJ Sparo (Scenario), Vex'd (Planet-mu), Soundkillaz, and Ravi Shakti (Solenca). The artwork for this album was produced by legendary Spanish graffiti artist SLK/ Seleka and it is entitled "Kaps from the world famous pornostars" and now owner of Delimbo Galleries in Madrid & Sevilla. Bukkake Ski Trip saw Foreign Beggars earliest foray into electronic music with a Dubstep collaboration with Vex'd (now Kuedo) which was recorded in 2004

=== Stray Point Agenda (May 2006) ===
Foreign Beggars second studio album entitled Stray Point Agenda was released on 3 May 2006. The record described as darker than their original release featured guest production from Oh No (Stones Throw) and Ninja Tune’s recording artist DJ Vadim as well as guest spots from Dr. Syntax, Skrein, Dubbledge, Graziella, Wildchild and Dudley Perkins. Prior to the release of the album, the singles "Let Go" (featuring Wildchild) which featured the B-sides "Million Skill March" (featuring Wildchild, Dr. Syntax & DJ IQ) and "Crying Shame" (featuring Dr. Syntax) and the single "Slow Broiled Ilk" produced by Oh No (Stonesthrow) which featured the B-sides "Backdraft" and "Hot Plate" (featuring Dubbledge) were released to promote the album. A video for "Slow Broiled Ilk" was also released. Following the release of the album, the single "Black Hole Prophecies", produced by DJ Vadim, was released on 16 April 2007. The single also includes the "Wild Wild East" remix, which was produced by UK rap artist Jehst, and the B-side track "In It for a Minute" (featuring Graziella).

=== Beggars Brew (Aug 2006) ===
This mixtape was released on a limited edition CD digi pack.

=== "Hit That Gash" (Oct 2008) ===
The explicit and tongue-in-cheek themed "Hit That Gash" was a collaboration with French rappers Rouge À Levres (Grems and Disiz) and was released as a single with an accompanying video produced by Tony Truand which has received over 200,000 YouTube hits. The single contains a number of remixes from the following artists: Scratch Perverts' Prime Cuts, D - Code from shivasound system, Kid Dub (Definitive), Kyza, Dubbledge, Inja, Chester P (Taskforce) LDZ (aka London Zoo), Ranking Records' Seemoreproductions and Ruckspin, Dag Nabbit, and Sydney's Killa Queenz. A dubstep version of the record was released with remixes from DJ Primecuts and DJ Ruckspin entitled Hit That Gash (Dubstep Remixes)

=== Neurosonics Audiomedical Lab ===
In 2009 Foreign Beggars, Dr Syntax and Stig of the Dump were asked to collaborate with The Scratch Perverts for the video Neurosonics Audiomedical Lab. The video features Metropolis, Orifice Vulgatron, Dr Syntax, Stig of the Dump and beatboxer Shlomo. The video was directed by Music Director Chris Carins and has been watched by over 600,000 people following an article in the London Publication "The Metro".

=== United Colours of Beggattron (Oct 2009) ===
In October 2009 the group released their third studio album United Colours of Beggattron, featuring notable production from Noisia and Ghosttown, as well as Dag Nabbit, guest appearances from Guilty Simpson (StonesThrow), Devlin, Phat Kat, Ben Sharpa, DJ 2Tall, Badness, Dubbledge, Jehst, Dr Syntax, Kyza and Kasmere. The track "Contact" which was a collaboration with Drum N Bass outfit Noisia was made into a video direct by Tony Truand Datis and has since been watched by over 15 million people on YouTube, Foreign Beggars most watched video to date. The track, which was featured on the E4 series "Skins", was released as a single with the song "Shake It", also a collaboration with Noisia, as a promo prior to the release of the album.

=== No Holds Barred / Get a Bit More – Excision and SKisM Remixes (Feb 2010) ===
"No Holds Barred" / "Get a Bit More" – Excision and SKisM Remixes was released through Never Say Die Records in February 2010. The two tracks are remixes of songs taken from United Colours of Beggattron, both tracks have supporting videos.

=== Beggattron Remixed EP 1 & 2 (Jun 2010 / Sep 2010) ===
The first installment of the remixed album contains an original track entitled "Typhoon" featuring Chasing Shadows, remixes by Plastician, Goth Trad, DJ Troubl and New Sex Fiend and the instrumentals of two of the remixed tracks. The second includes remixes by Om Unit, Planas, Blue Daisy, Diverse Concepts and DJ Troubl and the original track "Gravity" featuring Dabrye & DJ 2Tall.

=== The Uprising (October 2012) ===
The Uprising is the Beggars' fourth studio album. It was released on 1 October 2012 through mau5trap. The group completed their nine-date headline Uprising Tour in 2013, off the back of the album release, supported by True Tiger and ƱZ. The original dates were from 9 to 19 October 2012, but the tour was postponed due to unforeseen reasons. A remix of the album track "Crep Hype" by MRK1 was released as a free download on 22 December 2012. "See the Light" features on the FIFA 13 soundtrack as well as the Ministry of Sound compilation Addicted To Bass 2013.

=== I Am Legion (September 2013) ===
I Am Legion is the self-titled collaborative album by the supergroup composed of Dutch drum and bass trio Noisia and Metropolis and Orifice Vulgatron. The album was released on 2 September 2013 through Division, OWSLA and Par Excellence. The album topped the Beatport releases chart within three days of release. The album has had two singles so far: "Make Those Move" and "Choosing For You", and an instrumental version of the album will be released on 29 November 2013.

=== Modus (2015) ===
Modus is a three-track extended play featuring Eprom, Alix Perez and Riko Dan, written and recorded in a warehouse in Los Angeles and partially recorded at the Red Bull Studios in Los Angeles. Riko Dan was later recorded at the Total Refreshment Centre in London. Videos were produced for two of the project's three songs; the "Modus" video was directed by Sam Fisher from A-Space & Melody Maker from XIPHI productions, while the video for "Deng" was directed by Jack Thompson-Roylance for Deadbeat Films.

=== The Bits EP (2016) ===
The Bits was a 2 track EP. The title track "The Bits" was produced by Bristol-based ASA & Sorrow. 100 Standard was produced by Fracture & Machinedrum and features UK Rapper Ocean Wisdom

=== "48" (2017) ===
'48' was a collaboration project between Foreign Beggars & Monster Florence that was initially intended to be an EP. The 2 Groups got together at Tom Donovan Studios having invited a carefully selected group of artists to write and record a project in 48 Hours. 9 tracks were created and the EP became an Album. Artists that featured on the project are Sumgii, Rinse the Nerd, Seeka Lytes, Bekille Music, Chisora Agor, Wolf Kash, Sumgii, Greg Blackman, Tom Donovan, The Monster Florence band, Greta Lindsay & many more. All the proceeds from the album are dedicated to helping the homeless.

=== 2 2 K A R M A (2018) ===
22 Karma is the Beggars' fifth studio album. It was released through Par Excellence in 2018. It features the artists Rag'n'Bone Man, OG Maco, Kojey Radical, Kate Tempest, Izzie Gibbs, Dizmack and Marcello Spooks, with production from Alix Perez, Ivy Lab, Flux Pavilion, Feed Me and Bangzy.

== Discography ==
=== Albums ===
- Asylum Speakers (2003, Dented)
- Bukkake Ski Trip (2006, Dented)
- Stray Point Agenda (2006, Dented)
- Asylum Agenda (2008)
- United Colours of Beggattron (2009, Dented)
- Beggattron Remixed (2010, Dented)
- The Uprising (2012, mau5trap)
- I Am Legion (with Noisia) (2013, Division/Owsla/Par Excellence)
- 48 (2017) Gold Bar Records
- 2 2 K A R M A (2018, Par Excellence Records)
- Matriachy (2019, Par Excellence Records)

=== Singles and EPs ===
- "Where Did the Sun Go?" (2002, Dented)
- "Seasons Beatings" (2003, Dented)
- "Hold On" / "Frosted Perspects" (2003, Dented)
- Crypt Drawl (2005, Dented)
- "Let Go" (2005, Dented)
- "Slow Broiled Ilk" (2006, Dented)
- "In It for a Minute" / "Black Hole Prophecies" (2007, Dented)
- "Hit That G@$h" (vs. Rouge À Levres) (2008, Dented)
- "Contact" (with Noisia) (2009, Dented)
- "Seven Figure Swagger" / "Don't Dhoow It" (with remixes by Machinedrum and Bar 9) (2009, Dented)
- "No Holds Barred" / "Get a Bit More" – Excision and Skism Remixes (2010, Never Say Die)
- Beggattron Remixed EP 1 (2010, Dented)
- Beggattron Remixed EP 2 (2010, Dented)
- "Badman Riddim (Jump)" (with Vato Gonzalez) (2011, Ministry of Sound) - UK #7, BPI: Silver
- The Harder They Fall EP (2011, Never Say Die)
- "Still Getting It" (2011, Never Say Die)
- "Palm of My Hand" (2012, mau5trap)
- "Flying to Mars" (2012, mau5trap)
- "Anywhere" (2012, mau5trap)
- "Apex" (2012, mau5trap)
- Modus EP (2014, Par Excellence)
- "The Bits" (featuring Asa & Sorrow) / "100 Standard" (featuring Fracture, Machinedrum and Ocean Wisdom) (2016, Par Excellence)
- "Toast" (featuring Alix Perez, Izzie Gibbs, Dizmack & SGT. Pokes) (2017, Foreign Beggars Live Ltd.)
- "Bosh"
- "Waved"
- "Breakout"
- "Comatose"
- "No Enema" (with Seedhe Maut & Sez on the Beat) (2021, Azadi Records)
- "MAXIMISE"
- "Vibin'"
- "Shades Of Amaranth"
- LDNYCDXB EP (2022, 4NC¥)

=== Mixtapes ===
- Bukkake Ski Trip
- Beggars Brew
- Strictly Grizzness
- Peak Season

== Awards ==
The group won "Best New Act" at the 2004 UK Hip Hop awards and were voted best group at the Lyric Pad Hip Hop awards in 2005. They were nominated for best European Hip Hop Act at the 2010 Urban Music Awards, alongside nominees Roots Manuva, Ken Ring, Professor Green, La Fouine and Tinie Tempah.

== Tours ==
Foreign Beggars toured extensively worldwide, including the United States, most of mainland Europe, Australia, New Zealand, Canada, China, India, Arabia and even on Karlsoye Island in the Arctic Circle. They have supported artists such as The Prodigy, Snoop Dogg, Amy Winehouse, Skrillex, Deadmau5, Public Enemy, Ian Brown and De La Soul.

Following the release of United Colours of Beggattron the band were invited on the 2010 UK Prodigy Tour. This led to a host of European Festival appearances including a main stage performance at Exit Festival, Glastonbury, Splash Festival, Dour Festival and Giles Peterson's Worldwide Festival in Sete, France.

In 2012, they were broadcast live on computers, iPhones, and iPads for the iTunes Festival 2012, as an opening act for Deadmau5.

== Members ==
- Orifice Vulgatron - vocals
- Metropolis - vocals (deceased)
- DJ Nonames - turntable
- Dag Nabbit - production

=== Extended Fam ===
- Shlomo
- Dr Syntax
- Skrein
- Graziella
- Kyza
- Reeps One
- MC Zani
- THePETEBOX
- LDZ (London Zoo)
- Son of Kick
- Grems
- Skinnyman
- Tommy Evans
- Sizox

=== Touring members ===
- Pravvy Prav
- William Davies
- Raphael White
- Simon Ribchester
- Niall Lavelle
