= Noisia =

Dutch electronic music band

- Also known as: Nightwatch; Drifter; Hustle Athletics; Frizz; De Huilende Rappers
- Origin: Groningen, Netherlands
- Genres: Drum and bass; Neurofunk; Techstep; Breakbeat; Electro house; Dubstep; Grime
- Years active: 2003–2022; 2026–present
- Labels: Vision; Division; Invisible; mau5trap; Owsla; Roc Nation; Spinnin'
- Members: Martijn van Sonderen; Nik Roos; Thijs de Vlieger
- Website: noisia.nl

Noisia (/ˈnɔɪziə/) is a Dutch electronic music trio from Groningen. The trio is composed of Nik Roos, Martijn van Sonderen, and Thijs de Vlieger. Their music spans several genres, including drum and bass, dubstep, breakbeat, and house. They released music on labels such as Skrillex's Owsla, deadmau5's mau5trap, and Jay-Z's Roc Nation. Noisia collaborated with Foreign Beggars on the supergroup project I Am Legion, releasing a self-titled album on 2 September 2013. They also worked under the pseudonym Nightwatch, contributing to projects with artists like Alexis Jordan, Hadouken!, Wiley, and Wretch 32. Their production work on Hadouken!'s album, For the Masses, resulted in a number 19 placement on the UK Albums Chart.

Noisia also created music for video games; including the soundtrack for DmC: Devil May Cry, a Counter-Strike: Global Offensive Music Kit in 2014, and the original soundtrack for the game, Armajet.

== Career ==
=== 2003–06: Formation and record deals ===
Van Sonderen, with his experience in hip hop production and piano skill, formed Noisia with Roos and de Vlieger. Their song "Tomahawk" (with Mayhem) gained attention from Shadow Law Recordings, leading to their debut release "Silicon" / "Tomahawk" on Paul Reset's Nerve Recordings in August 2003.

Noisia also released music under the aliases Drifter and Hustle Athletics. Releases as Drifter included "Come True" / "Leola" and "Close to Me" / "She Gives Me Forever" in 2005, while the Lekker EP was released as Hustle Athletics in 2006.

=== 2007–09: Commercial breakthrough and productions ===
In early 2007, Noisia produced Tasha Baxter's album Colour of Me for EMI South Africa. The album, completed over a year, blended pop, reggae, and drum and bass influences. In June 2008, they released FabricLive.40, a mix CD featuring many of their own tracks. They also remixed The Prodigy's "Omen" in 2009. Mid-2009 saw them producing Hadouken!'s second album, For the Masses, released in 2010. The album reached number 19 on the UK Albums Chart.

=== 2010–15: Split the Atom and other ventures ===
Noisia's debut studio album, Split the Atom, was released on 5 April 2010, preceded by the singles "Machine Gun" (8 March 2010) and "Split the Atom" (25 July 2010). A special edition, featuring 2012 remixes, was released on mau5trap on 27 February 2012. Later in 2012, they remixed Mark Knight's "Nothing Matters" and The Prodigy's "Smack My Bitch Up" for the re-release of The Fat of the Land.

Noisia also contributed music to short films and video games, including Midnight Club 3: Dub Edition, Wipeout Pulse, Wipeout HD, Wipeout HD Fury, Dance Dance Revolution Universe 2 (with "The Tide"), Gran Turismo PSP (with "Stigma"), DJ Hero (with "Groundhog"), and MotorStorm: Pacific Rift (remixed "Groundhog"). They collaborated with Klaus Badelt on remixes for the MotorStorm: Apocalypse soundtrack. The 16bit remix of "Machine Gun" featured in the Far Cry 3 trailer, and "Could This Be" and "Machine Gun" were used in SSX. They produced over three hours of music for Ninja Theory's DmC: Devil May Cry, resulting in a 36-track soundtrack released through Division on 15 January 2013.

Noisia manages two record labels: Vision Recordings (for drum and bass) and Division Recordings (for other genres like house and grime). Invisible Recordings, launched in March 2010, focused on experimental drum and bass and closed in 2019.

=== I Am Legion ===
I Am Legion was a supergroup formed by Noisia and Foreign Beggars. Their self-titled debut album was released on 2 September 2013, following the singles "Make Those Move" and "Choosing for You".

=== 2015–2018: Outer Edges ===
Noisia announced their second studio album, Outer Edges, on 10 June 2016, releasing the single "Anomaly". "Collider" followed as a second single with a promotional video on 30 June 2016, alongside the album's track listing and pre-order information. The release date was set for 16 September 2016. The group stated that the album title reflected the individual exploration of each song's "edge".

The album leaked online on 29 July 2016, shortly before the premiere of a new audio-visual show at the Let It Roll festival. Noisia officially released the album digitally on 5 August 2016, with the physical release following in September.

=== 2019–2022: Split and final album Closer ===
On 17 September 2019, Noisia announced that they would disband at the end of 2020, citing creative differences. They planned to continue releasing music and touring until the end of the year, with the possibility of future collaborations. Their farewell tour was extended into 2021 due to the COVID-19 pandemic. In June 2020, some of their songs became available in the rhythm game osu!.

On 28 April 2022, Noisia announced a final album, Closer, encompassing their various musical styles. They played their final show together on 21 August 2022.

=== 2026–present: Reunion ===
On 17 September 2026, exactly 7 years after their announcement that they would disband, Noisia announced that they would return as a band alongside their individual projects. Their first show following the reunion is scheduled for 4 December 2026 at the Melkweg in Amsterdam.

== Awards ==
Noisia received multiple Drum&BassArena Awards in 2015, including Best Producer, Best Track ("Dead Limit", with the Upbeats), and Best Live Act.

In 2016, they won Best Video ("Mantra"), Best Album (Outer Edges), and Best Producer at the Drum&BassArena Awards.

== Side projects ==
Members of Noisia have been part of various solo and side projects both before and after Noisia's split.

- Thijs de Vlieger releases solo music as Thys, with original releases and remixes on Vision Recordings and Fool's Gold. His side projects include:
  - VIER, consisting of Thys, Machinedrum, Holly, and Salvador Breed.
  - ILY, consisting of Thys and Skrillex.
- Nik Roos releases solo music as Sleepnet, with the First Light and II EPs on Vision Recordings. His side projects include:
  - Ring Noord, consisting of Sleepnet and Former.
  - Body Ocean, consisting of Sleepnet and Jeremy Glenn of the Upbeats.
- Martijn van Sonderen does not have a solo project, but is part of the techno and house duo Zonderling alongside Vision Recordings manager Jaap de Vries.
- Martijn van Sonderen, Thijs de Vlieger and Nik Roos are three of the four members of the Dutch language comedy rap group De Huilende Rappers (under pseudonyms), and next to rapping, responsible for that groups' advanced beats.

== Discography ==
- Split the Atom (2010)
- I Am Legion (with Foreign Beggars) (2013)
- Outer Edges (2016)
- Closer (2022)
