= Phace =

- Born: Florian Harres; 7 March
- Origin: Hamburg, Germany
- Genres: Drum and bass; Electro; Halftempo; Techno
- Occupations: producer; DJ; label owner
- Instruments: Synthesizer; Drum Machine; Music Sequencer; Personal Computer
- Years active: 2004–present
- Labels: Neosignal; Owsla; mau5trap; NËU; Vision; Critical; Division; Kitsuné
- Website: phace.space

Phace (real name Florian Harres; born 7 March) is a German music producer, DJ and label owner living in Hamburg, Germany. Influenced by bands and artists such as Kraftwerk, Tangerine Dream, The Prodigy, Photek, Thomas Bangalter, Miles Davis, Optical and Konflict, he is known for his state of the art, futuristic, and distinct sound-design and songwriting. He records music both with analog and digital equipment in his studio in Hamburg Altona.

He produces a wide variety of music, mainly drum and bass, but also techno, electro, halftempo, bass and beats and scores music for film and videogames. He also remixed many pieces of music and co-owns two record labels: Neosignal and NËU, and has released on several other labels including Skrillex's OWSLA, Zeds Dead's DEADBEATS Deadmau5's Mau5trap, Kitsuné, Noisia's 'Vision' and Division and has performed at international music festivals such as EDC, Beyond Wonderland, Let it Roll, Frequency, UAF, Outlook, Dour, Fusion, Boomtown etc.

He is also one half of the German electronic band project Neosignal (together with Michael Bräuninger/Misanthrop). They debuted their electro audio-visual live show (based on Ableton Live) at London's legendary Fabric Night Club in 2013.

At the start of his international career he was voted Germany's "Best Drum and Bass DJ & Producer" at the Future Music Awards in 2006. His debut album PSYCHO, released in 2007 on Subtitles Music imprint, was voted Album of the Month in the British Mixmag Magazine. To the present he released 5 full-length studio albums and is regarded as a ground breaking figure of bass-focused electronic music. His 2018 album BETWEEN, released on his own label Neosignal Recordings, was again listed Album of the Month in Mixmag Magazine in August 2018.
