= Crystal Fighters discography =

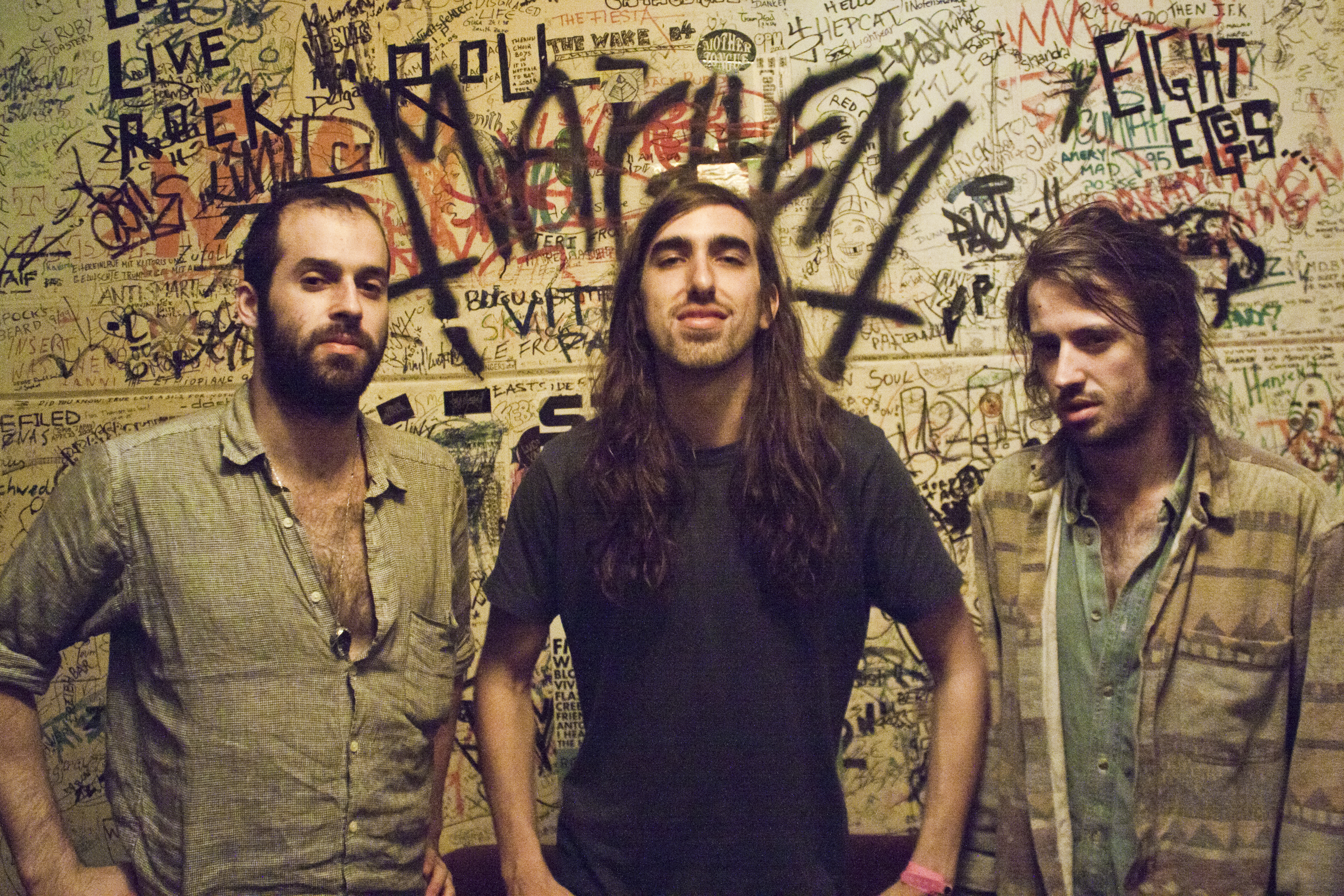
- Crystal Fighters, Salzburg 2011
- Studio albums: 2
- Singles: 9
- Music videos: 10

The discography of Crystal Fighters, an English electronic band, consists of four studio albums, nine singles and ten music videos.

Crystal Fighters' debut album, Star of Love was released in October 2010 and produced a chain of well received singles. The release of their second album, Cave Rave, in May 2013, was preceded by one official single, two official videos, and the airing and/or online streaming of the first four tracks.

== Studio albums ==
List of albums, with selected chart positions, sales, and certifications
Title	Album details	Peak chart positions									
Title	Album details	UK	AUS Hit.	AUT	BEL (FL)	BEL (WA)	FRA	NLD	SPA	SWI	US Heat
Star of Love	Released: 4 October 2010; Label: Zirkulo; Formats: CD, digital download	—	16	—	—	89	200	36	—	—	—
Cave Rave	Released: 27 May 2013; Label: Zirkulo/PIAS; Formats: CD, digital download	87	9	60	76	112	—	61	86	77	27
Everything Is My Family	Released: 21 October 2016; Label: Zirkulo/PIAS; Formats: CD, digital download	—	—	—	—	—	—	—	81	—	—
Gaia & Friends	Released: 1 March 2019; Label: Warner Bros. Records; Formats: digital download	—	—	—	—	—	—	—	—	—	—
"—" denotes an album that did not chart or was not released.

== Singles ==
List of singles with selected chart positions, showing year released and album name
Single	Year	Peak chart positions										Album
Single	Year	UK	AUS	AUT	BEL (FL) Tip	BEL (WA) Tip	CZR	FRA	GER	NLD	SPA	Album
"Xtatic Truth"	2009	—	—	—	—	—	—	—	—	—	—	Star of Love
"I Love London"	2009	—	—	—	—	—	—	—	—	—	—	Star of Love
"In The Summer"	2010	—	—	—	—	—	—	—	—	—	—	Star of Love
"Swallow" / "Follow"	2010	— (Note: "Follow" did not enter the UK Singles Chart, but peaked at number 31 on the UK Physical Singles Chart Top 100.)	—	—	—	20	—	31	—	—	—	Star of Love
"At Home"	2011	—	—	—	45	24	—	—	—	—	40	Star of Love
"Plage"	2011	— (Note: "Plage" did not enter the UK Singles Chart, but peaked at number 67 on the UK Physical Singles Chart Top 100.)	—	—	—	—	—	—	—	9	—	Star of Love
"Love Is All I Got" (with Feed Me)	2012	123	64	21	60	18	27	—	72	78	—	Calamari Tuesday
"You & I"	2013	108	—	—	15	31	—	—	92	99	—	Cave Rave
"LA Calling"	2013	—	—	—	57	—	—	—	—	—	—	Cave Rave
"Love Alight"	2014	—	—	—	45	—	—	—	—	—	—	Non-album single
"All Night"	2016	—	—	—	8	— (Note: "All Night" did not enter the Wallonie Ultratop 50, but charted as an extra tip on the Ultratip chart.)	—	—	—	—	—	Everything Is My Family
"Ways I Can't Tell"	2016	—	—	—	—	—	—	—	—	—	—	Everything Is My Family
"Good Girls"	2016	—	—	—	—	46	—	—	—	—	—	Everything Is My Family
"Lay Low"	2016	—	—	—	—	—	—	—	—	—	—	Everything Is My Family
"Yellow Sun"	2017	—	—	—	—	—	—	—	—	—	—	Everything Is My Family
"Boomin' In Your Jeep"	2018	—	—	—	—	—	—	—	—	—	—	Non-album single
"Another Level"	2018	—	—	—	—	—	—	—	—	—	—	Gaia & Friends
"Goin' Harder" (featuring Bomba Estéreo)	2018	—	—	—	—	—	—	—	—	—	—	Gaia & Friends
"Wild Ones"	2019	—	—	—	—	—	—	—	—	—	—	Gaia & Friends
"Runnin'"	2019	—	—	—	—	—	—	—	—	—	—	Gaia & Friends
"—" denotes singles that did not chart or were not released

== Music videos ==
Year	Video	Director(s)
2010	"Xtatic Truth"	James Spencer
2010	"I Love London"	Martin Zahringer
2010	"In The Summer"	Tobias Stretch
2010	"Swallow"	Tobias Stretch
2010	"Follow"	Ian Pons Jewell
2011	"At Home"	Ferry Gouw
2011	"Plage"	Beaty Heart
2012	"Love Is All I Got"	US
2013	"Separator"	Elliott Sellers
2013	"You & I"	Elliott Sellers
2014	"Love Alight"	Rob Heppell
2016	"Good Girls"	Patrick Blades
2017	"Lay Low"	Wayne McCauslin
2017	"In Your Arms"	
2017	"Yellow Sun"	Rob Brandon
2017	"All Night"	Leopold
2018	"Boomin' in Your Jeep"	
2018	"The Moondog"	Wayne McCauslin
2018	"Goin' Harder"	Stanley Sunday
2019	"All My Love"	Balthazar Klarwein
2019	"Wild Ones"	Stanley Sunday

== Remixes and appearances ==
=== 2009 ===
- 80Kidz – This Is My Works
  - "I Love London" (80Kidz Remix)
- Annie Mac – Annie Mac Presents
  - "Xtatic Truth"
- I Love London EP
  - "I Love London" (80kidz REMIX)
  - "I Love London" (Brackles Remix)
  - "I Love London" (Lorcan Mak Remix)
  - "I Love London" (Qoso Remix)
  - "I Love London" (In Flagranti Dub)
  - "I Love London" (Matt Walsh & Alex Jones's Met Police Re-Think)
  - "I Love London" (Delta Heavy Remix)
- Kitsuné Maison Compilation 7
  - "Xtatic Truth" (Xtra Loud Mix)
- Kitsuné Maison Compilation 8
  - "I Love London"
- Kitsuné Remixes Album #2
  - "Xtatic Truth" (Renaissance Man Remix)
- Rob Da Bank – Bestival '09
  - "Xtatic Truth" (L-VIS 1990 Mix)
- Trax Sampler 130
  - "I Love London" (Lorcan Mak Remix)
- "Xtatic Truth" (single)
  - "Xtatic Truth" (Maybb Remix)
  - "Xtatic Truth" (Magistrates Remix)
  - "Xtatic Truth" (Renaissance Man Remix)
  - "Xtatic Truth" (Last Japan Remix)
- Xtatic Truth Remixes EP2
  - "Xtatic Truth" (Arcade Remix)
  - "Xtatic Truth" (L-VIS 1990 Remix)
  - "Xtatic Truth" (Radioproof's Fighting Talk Mix)
  - "Xtatic Truth" (Tomoki & Nono Remix)
  - "Xtatic Truth" (Micromattic Remix)
- Xtatic Truth" Remixes EP3
  - "Xtatic Truth" (Totally Enormous Extinct Dinosaurs Remix)
  - "Xtatic Truth" (Douster Remix Radio Edit)
  - "Xtatic Truth" (Kukuxu sees the Xtatic Truth)
  - "Xtatic Truth" (Kitch 'n Sync Mix)
  - "Xtatic Truth" (Beesemyer Remix)
  - "Xtatic Truth" (PHOTOMACHINE Dub remix)
  - "Xtatic Truth" (Chesus and Rodski RMX)

=== 2010 ===
- DJ P.O.L. Style – Мишка Presents Keep Watch Vol. XVIII
  - Crystal Fighters vs. DJ Pied Piper – "I Love London" (Brackles Remix) vs. "Do You Really Like It?"
- Follow / Swallow EP1
  - "Follow" (Radio Mix)
  - "Swallow" (Radio Edit)
  - "Follow" (Diskjokke Mix)
  - "Follow" (Consequence Mix)
  - "Follow" (D/R/U/G/S/ Inner Galaxy Mix)
  - "Follow" (Jay Weed Mix)
  - "Follow" (Spieltrieb Mix)
- Follow / Swallow EP2
  - "Swallow" (Funtcase Mix)
  - "Swallow" (Angger Dimas Remix)
  - "Swallow" (Angger Dimas Dubstep Remix)
  - "Swallow" (Ruckspin Mix)
  - "Follow" (Roksonix Mix)
  - "Follow" (Out One Mix)
  - "Follow" (LOL Boys Mix)
- Gildas & Masaya – Tokyo
  - "I Love London" (In Flagranti Dub)
- In The Summer EP1
  - "In The Summer" (dBridge Mix)
  - "In The Summer" (Sepalcure Dub)
  - "In The Summer" (Shortstuff Remix)
  - "In The Summer" (Tek-One Remix)
  - "In The Summer" (Telepathe Remix)
  - "In The Summer" (Canblaster Remix)
- In The Summer EP2
  - "In The Summer" (Brookes Brothers Remix)
  - "In The Summer" (Brookes Brothers Radio Edit)
  - "In The Summer" (SRC Mix)
  - "In The Summer" (French Fries Mix)
  - "In The Summer" (Malente & Dex Dub)
- In The Summer EP3
  - "In The Summer" (Abyssalo Remix by Gohan)
  - "In The Summer" (Picture House's 'Summer in the Balearics' Mix)
  - "In The Summer" (Streetlife DJs Remix)
  - "In The Summer" (Genuine Guy Remix)
- Kitsuné Remixes Album #3
  - "I Love London" (80Kidz Remix)
- Oneman – Rinse: 11
  - "I Love London" (Brackles Remix)
- Plus Ultra – Autonomic Podcast Layer 12
  - "Follow" (Consequence Remix)
- Sound Pellegrino Thermal Team – The Sound Pellegrino Podcast Episode 4
  - "Follow" (Out One Remix)
- Un Automne 2010
  - "Swallow"

=== 2011 ===
- At Home EP
  - "At Home" (Radio Edit)
  - "At Home" (Disclosure Mix)
  - "At Home" (Berou & Canblaster Mix)
  - "At Home" (Fusty Delight Mix)
  - "At Home" (Pony Pony Run Run Mix)
  - "At Home" (Kelley Polar Different Trains to Paradise Mix)
  - "At Home" (E. Russell Mix)
  - "At Home" (Twiggy and TruFix Remix)
- Día de la música 2011
  - "Fiesta de los maniquíes"
- "Plage" (single)
  - "Plage" (Trev's Analog-Funk Mix)
  - "Plage" (Auntie Flo Mix)
- Plage EP
  - "Plage" (Radio Edit)
  - "Plage" (Hackman Mix)
  - "Plage" (Dauwd Mix)
  - "Plage" (Radioproof Mix)
  - "Plage" (Lapalux Mix)
  - "Plage" (Compuphonic Mix)
- Radio 538 - Hitzone 58
  - "Plage"
- Sound Pellegrino Thermal Team – The Sound Pellegrino Podcast Episode 9
  - "At Home" (Berou & Canblaster Remix)
- Tsugi Bonus Digital : Tsugi 38
  - I Do This Everyday

=== Misc ===
- "At Home" - (Hermanos Inglesos remix dub)
- "At Home" - (Hidden Cat Remix)
- "At Home" - (Kido Yoji Remix)
- "At Home" - (Scuola Furano remix dub)
- "At Home" - (Tete De Tigre remix)
- "I Love London" (Femme En Fourrure Remix)
- "I Love London" (Goldierocks Remix)
- "I Love London" (Highbloo Remix)
- "I Love London" (Jocks' Dawn in Dalston Mix)
- "I Love London" (KiD COLA Remix)
- "I Love London" (Paparazzi Remix)
- "I Love London" (Unreleased Edit)

=== Remixes for other artists ===
- Master Shortie 'Dance Like A White Boy'
- The Wombats 'Jump into The Fog'
- CSS 'Let's Reggae All Night'
- Erik Hassle 'Don't Bring Flowers'
- Magic Wands 'Black Magic'
- MIT 'Rauch'
- Pony Pony Run Run 'Hey You'
- Two Door Cinema Club 'I Can Talk'
- Alex Winston 'Velvet Elvis'
- Vadoinmessico 'Teeo'

=== Mixtapes ===
- Feast of Aurora
- Pop Espanol (Rough Trade exclusive CD)
- Que Vasco Eres
- Online Mixtape
- Radio Mix for Kitsuné (Broadcast on Le Mouv)
- Kiss FM Minimix (Broadcast by Loose Cannons Kiss 100 FM)
- Online Mixtape
- Dreams of Disco Mixtape
