= Spor =

Spor may refer to:

- Jon Gooch (born 1984), British DJ
- Spor (Slavic demon), a frumentaceous demon in Slavic mythology
