= Calamari Tuesday =

Studio album by Feed Me
- Released: 14 October 2013
- Recorded: 2011–13
- Genres: Electro house; dubstep; progressive house; glitch hop
- Length: 70:27
- Label: Sotto Voce
- Producer: Jon Gooch

Singles from Calamari Tuesday
- 1. "Love Is All I Got" Released: 26 October 2012; 2. "Death By Robot" Released: 16 January 2013

Calamari Tuesday is the debut studio album by Feed Me, one of the projects of British record producer Jon Gooch. The album was released on 14 October 2013 as the first release on Gooch's own label Sotto Voce. It entered the UK Dance Albums Chart at number 14 and the UK Albums Chart at number 144.

== Background and release ==
Calamari Tuesday follows the release of Feed Me's 2010 eleven-track EP Feed Me's Big Adventure. Despite being long enough to classify as an album, Gooch said "Big Adventure was an EP not LP. I see the difference as being a magazine vs. a novel." Since the EP, Gooch has also released two shorter extended plays: To the Stars (2011) and Escape from Electric Mountain (2012). He told Dancing Astronaut "I treated CT more so as something you can hopefully listen to all through and feel you've learnt something. I grew up listening to albums like I would watch films or read books, even though technology has changed, the album as whole is a format I still hold a lot of faith in. EPs are easy." Throughout this time period, Gooch was also recording album tracks, such as "Lonely Mountain" which was started in 2011. In contrast, "Rat Trap" was written in around four hours in 2012. "Ophelia" was originally a demo titled "Abel" and was played in Gooch's mixes over a year prior to release. This, along with several other album tracks, featured in his Essential Mix. Gooch produced the majority of the album whilst touring, and called a hiatus from DJing so he could finish the remaining uncompleted tracks shortly before release. Even before the album was released, Gooch had started work on an album under his Spor alias as well as a second Feed Me album. He's confirmed new collaborations with Zeros, Noisia, Skrillex, YADi and Kill The Noise.

== Marketing ==
=== Singles ===
"Love Is All I Got" is the album's lead single, a collaboration with folktronica band Crystal Fighters. It was released on 26 October 2012 through deadmau5's label mau5trap. The song managed to chart at number 123 on the UK Singles Chart as well as in several countries including Australia, Germany and the Netherlands. An official music video, directed by mau5trap, was released on 11 October 2012. It has since accumulated over seven million YouTube views. "Death By Robot" is the second single from the album. It was released on 16 January 2013 through mau5trap, accompanied by the tracks "Gravel" and "Dialup Days" that don't feature on the album.

== Reception ==
Professional ratings
Review scores
| Source | Rating |
|---|---|
| Dancing Astronaut | (favourable) |
| Earmilk | 9/10 |
| This Song is Sick | (favourable) |
| Sputnikmusic | 2.5/5 |

=== Critics' response ===
The album received mixed to positive reviews from critics. Dancing Astronaut writer Michael Sundius said the following about the album:

"I am ultimately most drawn to the album’s opening and closing selections. While the body of the work is undeniably impressive, some of the electro tracks in the middle felt a little lackluster in comparison to the emotional promise of the album’s opening and closing. At the end of the day, however, Calamari Tuesday is a fitting first album for Feed Me. The LP showcases Jon Gooch’s considerable production value and masterful genre-blending abilities; the extensive track list breathes life into the character of Feed Me, both solidifying and evolving the fiction into something very real and intensely compelling."

Earmilk's Cam MacNeil gave the album a nine out of ten, commenting "It's difficult to make an album full of club-ready electro and dubstep tell a story, but Feed Me does just that on Calamari Tuesday. He's just as likely to use big-room synth arpeggios as he is acoustic piano. The dark themes on every track remind us that the Feed Me green goblin is much more than a gimmick: it is the phantom of Jon Gooch's opera."

This Song is Sick gave the album a positive review, commenting "Having established himself predominantly in electro and dubstep, Feed Me’s direction throughout ‘Calamari Tuesday’ will leave listeners captivated by his ability to encompass a wide variety of genre’s (sic) within the same song. Combinations of moombahton, trap, bass, and electro-house are interwoven in an aesthetically pleasing manner".

In a less positive review, Sputnikmusic writer Will Robinson called the album "exactly as expected."

== Track listing ==
| No. | Title | Writer(s) | Length |
|---|---|---|---|
| 1. | "Orion" | Jon Gooch | 5:08 |
| 2. | "Death By Robot" | Gooch | 3:47 |
| 3. | "Lonely Mountain" | Gooch | 5:40 |
| 4. | "Ebb & Flow" (featuring Tasha Baxter) | Gooch; Tasha Baxter | 5:08 |
| 5. | "Rat Trap" | Gooch | 3:48 |
| 6. | "Dazed" | Gooch | 6:41 |
| 7. | "Ophelia" (featuring YADi) | Gooch; Hannah Yadi | 4:17 |
| 8. | "Chinchilla" | Gooch | 4:54 |
| 9. | "In the Bin" | Gooch | 3:14 |
| 10. | "Fiasco" | Gooch | 3:53 |
| 11. | "Love Is All I Got" (with Crystal Fighters) | Gooch; Sebastian Pringle; Gilbert Vierich; Graham Dickson; Eleanor Fletcher | 3:05 |
| 12. | "Short Skirt" | Gooch | 4:00 |
| 13. | "No Grip" | Gooch | 4:48 |
| 14. | "Onstuh" | Gooch | 6:04 |
| 15. | "Last Requests" (featuring Jenna G, contains hidden track "Plus Keygen") | Gooch; Jenna Gibbons | 8:06 |

Notes

- "Ebb & Flow" is credited as featuring Tasha Baxter, but an alternate version of the song was released in 2011 as her single. The song on the album is one of three versions produced by Gooch.
- "Last Requests" ends at 5:55. A hidden song called "Plus Keygen" starts at 6:20.

== Personnel ==
- Jon Gooch – producer, mixing, vocals (9)

Additional musicians

- Eleanor Fletcher – vocals (11)
- Gilbert Vierich – vocals, instruments (11)
- Graham Dickson – vocals, instruments (11)
- Hannah Yadi - vocals (7)
- Jenna Gibbons - vocals (15)
- Sebastian Pringle – vocals, instruments (11)
- Tasha Baxter - vocals (4)

== Chart positions ==
| Chart (2013) | Peak position |
|---|---|
| UK Dance Albums (Official Charts Company) | 14 |
| UK Independent Albums (Official Charts Company) | 30 |
| UK Independent Breakers (Official Charts Company) | 4 |
| US Billboard 200 | 162 |
| US Top Current Albums (Billboard) | 151 |
| US Dance/Electronic Albums | 3 |
| US Independent Albums (Billboard) | 39 |
| US Top Heatseekers (Billboard) | 6 |

== Release history ==
| Region | Date | Format | Label |
|---|---|---|---|
| Worldwide | 14 October 2013 | Digital download, CD | Sotto Voce |
| Worldwide | 21 October 2013 | Vinyl | Sotto Voce |
