= Plage =

Plage may refer to:

- Solar plage, a bright region in the chromosphere of the Sun
- Plage (mycology), a clear, unornamented area on the basal area of an ornamented fungal spore
- "Plage" (song), a 2011 song by English electronic band Crystal Fighters
- Beach, a translation from French
- Merville-Franceville-Plage, a commune in France
- PLAGE, Platform Against Nuclear Dangers Salzburg (Plattform gegen Atomgefahren Salzburg)

== See also ==
- Plague (disambiguation)
