= Robert Oaks =

Robert Oaks may refer to:

- Robert C. Oaks (born 1936), U.S. Air Force general
- Bob Oaks (born 1952), American politician
- Apex (musician) (1981–2017), British musician, also known as Robert Oaks
