= Follow / Swallow =

Single by Crystal Fighters

from the album Star of Love
- Released: 27 September 2010
- Genre: Folktronica, alternative dance
- Length: "Follow": 3:16 "Swallow": 4:31
- Label: Zirkulo
- Songwriter(s): Crystal Fighters
- Producer(s): Crystal Fighters

Crystal Fighters singles chronology
"In The Summer" (2010)	"Follow / Swallow" (2010)	"At Home" (2011)

"Follow" / "Swallow" is the fourth single by English electronic band Crystal Fighters from their album Star of Love. The double A-side was released on 27 September 2010 through Zirkulo records, to positive reviews.

"Follow" was also featured on EA Sports FIFA 13.

== Music video ==
The music video for "Follow" was directed by Ian Pons Jewell and "Swallow" by Tobias Stretch.

== Track listing ==
No.	Title	Length
1.	"Follow"	03:16
2.	"Swallow"	04:31
3.	"In the Summer" (Brookes Brothers Remix)	05:15
Total length:		13:02

== Reception ==
The single received positive coverage in the media, with Laura of Glasswerk magazine positively reviewing both singles and describing the tracks as "Jubilant and effervescent"

James Canham, of ThisIsFakeDIY, mirrors this view, stating:

"Follow" is the stronger of the two tracks; it builds up slowly but steadily, keeping an exciting pace and loud, infectious chanting (though rhyming 'swallow' with 'way' by adding 'oh' is somewhat Stuart Murdochian) and into a high paced track that runs through loud choruses, acoustic guitar marrying with electronics (better than James Yuill, don't worry) and pulsing beats.

— James Canham

And had this to say of "Swallow":

Opening with vocals before adding both nylon string finger picking and rave synths together could fall down so easily, but here it works beautifully and seamlessly, making an identifiable and brilliant sound. The chorus is again catchy and all breaks are done well, it’s just not quite as addictive as the other A-Side.

— James Canham

== Charts ==
Song	Chart (2010)	Peak position
"Follow"	Top 40 NME Singles	22
"Follow"	Top 50 Ultratip (Wallonia)	20
"Follow"	Top 50 Ultratip: Dance (Wallonia)	39
"Follow"	SNEP French Singles Chart	40
"Swallow"	Top 40 NME Singles	27
