= At Home (song) =

Single by Crystal Fighters

from the album Star of Love
- Released: 14 March 2011
- Genre: Electronic
- Length: 3:50
- Label: Zirkulo
- Songwriter(s): Crystal Fighters
- Producer(s): Crystal Fighters

Crystal Fighters singles chronology
"In the Summer" (2010)	"At Home" (2011)	"Plage" (2011)

"At Home" is the fifth single by English electronic music band Crystal Fighters from their debut studio album, Star of Love. The single was released on 14 March 2011, by Zirkulo Records, to generally positive reviews.

== Release ==
The single was widely played as part of the BBC Radio 1 playlist and was Dev's "Record of the Week" for 21 February.

== Music video ==
The music video was directed by Ferry Gouw and shot by Adam Etherington.

== Track listing ==
No.	Title	Length
1.	"At Home"	3:50
2.	"At Home" (Berou & Canblaster mix)	3:59
3.	"At Home" (Kelley Polar Different Trains to Paradise mix)	5:48
4.	"At Home" (Mistabishi mix)	2:52
Total length:		16:29

== Reception ==
The single gained mainly positive reviews from the music industry, with Jasmine Phull of ThisIsFakeDIY awarding the album 8/10 and said this of the mix of traditional Basque music and electronica: "The quintet manages to bring two normally opposing genres together with an outcome not unlike one harmonious civil ceremony; the unity of two separate entities that work best when together". Major music magazines Q and Mojo both awarded the single 4 out of 5. Nick Bryans, of The Whiteboard Project, awarded the album 6.5 out of 10, citing the following:

A reoccurring and perturbing issue that resonates with the song, is if one would describe as impressive, rather than enjoyable. All the components are there, but it seems to lack a drive or spark. The big issue in this lo-fi style, is when a purposely demure tone starts to sound more like someone simply going through the motions, and certainly the song lacks drive and tenacity. It’s not enough to just be able to put styles of music together, you need to achieve something out of the ordinary with it.

— Nick Bryans

== Charts ==
Chart (2010)	Peak position
Top 50 Ultratip (Wallonia)	24
Top 50 Ultratip (Flanders)	45
Spain (PROMUSICAE)	40
