= Is Tropical =

British band

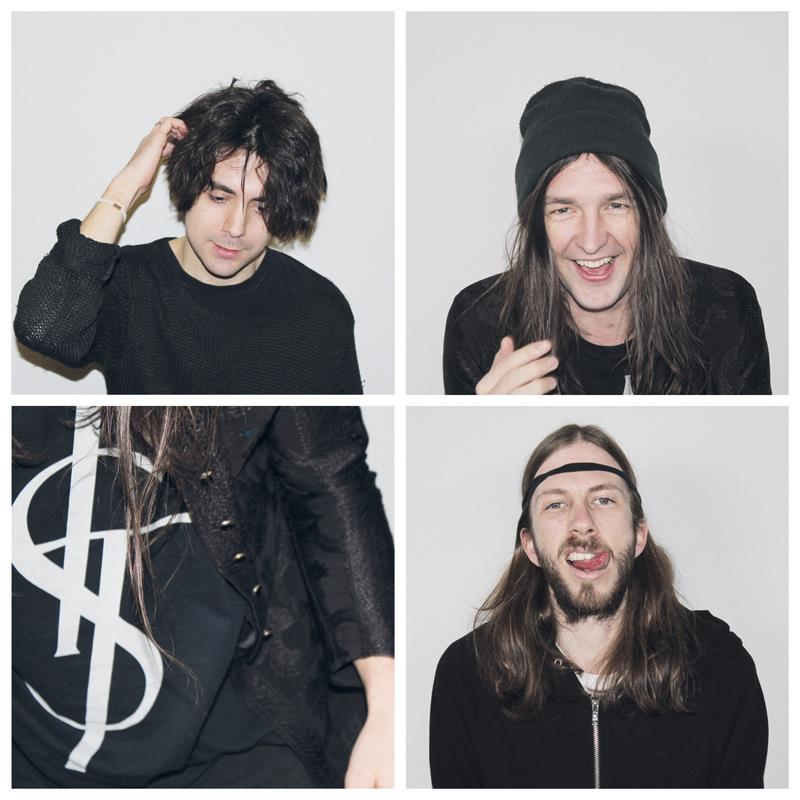
- Is Tropical in 2013

Background information
- Origin: London, England
- Genres: Indietronica, electronic rock, new rave
- Years active: 2009–present
- Label: Previous Kitsuné/Cooperative Music / Present Axis Mundi
- Members: Simon Milner; Gary Barber; Dominic Apa; Kirstie Fleck
- Website: www.istropical.com

Is Tropical are a band from London, England, with members as of 2014 including Simon Milner, Gary Barber, Dominic Apa, and Kirstie Fleck. Formed in 2009 as a trio, in June 2011 they released their debut album Native To, preceded by the single "The Greeks", which had a music video win awards at the UK Music Video Awards. Their first EP, Flags, was released in 2013, while their second album I'm Leaving was released that year on the label Kitsuné. They have toured with bands such as Egyptian Hip Hop, and are signed to Axis Mundi Records in New York. The band's third album, Black Anything, was released in March 2016.

== History ==
=== 2009-2013: Native To ===
Formed in London in 2009, the band released their debut single "When O’ When" on Hit Club Records in January 2010, produced by Al Al Al. They were soon signed to French music and fashion label Kitsuné. The band entered the studio in the autumn of 2010 with Jimmy Robertson to record their debut album, and released the single "South Pacific" in Jan 2011. This second release and first for their new label Kitsuné / Cooperative Music, was mixed by LEXXX. Around this time they toured the UK and Europe as special guests of Klaxons, The Big Pink, Mystery Jets, Good Shoes and also co-headlined a tour with Egyptian Hip Hop.

In June 2011 they released their debut album Native to, preceded by the single "The Greeks". "The Greeks" was accompanied by a video directed by French directors Megaforce, which quickly went viral (almost 3,500,000 plays to date on YouTube, and over 10,000,000 on Chinese YouTube). The video was critically praised and has won several awards such as The Antville Music Video Awards 2011, UK Music Video Awards 2011, D&AD Yellow Pencil Award 2012, and an Artrocker Award. After the release of Native to and of single "Lies", the band spent rest of 2011 and part of 2012 touring Europe, USA (with Crystal Fighters), Japan, South America and the Far East.

=== 2013-2014: Flags and I'm Leaving ===
In January 2013, Is Tropical released an EP, titled Flags, featuring artists Get People, Visions, Drugzndreamz, Goodbye Leopold and Owen Pratt.

The band released their second album I’m Leaving on 20 May 2013 on Kitsune / Pias. The album was produced by Luke Smith. The first single taken from the album is "Dancing Anymore", accompanied by a video by previous collaborators Megaforce, which gained notoriety and was removed from YouTube within hours of its release due to its graphic depiction of imagined sexual acts between a young man and naked CG characters. The second single, 'Lover's Cave' was released on 26 August 2013. The video was directed by cult New York photographer Richard Kern.

In April 2013, Is Tropical became one of the first Western bands to play in Mongolia. Their trip was filmed by Noisey with a 2 parts documentary and in an article by The Guardian.

== Awards and nominations ==
Antville Music Video Awards

Year	Nominee / work	Award	Result
2011	"The Greeks"	Video of the Year	Won
2011	"The Greeks"	Most Fun	Nominated
2011	"The Greeks"	Best Editing	Nominated
2011	"The Greeks"	Best Visual Effects	Nominated
2013	"Dancing Anymore"	Best Visual Effects	Nominated
2013	"Dancing Anymore"	Most Fun	Nominated

D&AD Awards

Year	Nominee / work	Award	Result
2012	"The Greeks"	Music Video	Yellow Pencil
2014	"Dancing Anymore"	Music Video	Yellow Pencil

UK Music Video Awards

Year	Nominee / work	Award	Result
2011	"The Greeks"	Best Animation	Won
2011	"The Greeks"	Best Rock/Indie Video - UK	Won
2013	"Dancing Anymore"	Best Rock/Indie Video - UK	Nominated
2013	"Dancing Anymore"	Best Animation	Nominated

== Discography ==
=== Albums ===
Professional ratings
Review scores
Source	Rating
BBC	positive
Consequence of Sound	3/5 stars
Drowned in Sound	6/10
NME	6/10 stars
Pitchfork	5.0/10

- Native To (Kitsuné, 13 June 2011)
- I'm Leaving (Kitsuné, 20 May 2013)
- Black Anything (Axis Mundi, 11 March 2016)
- Cola Spirit (Axis Mundi, 7 February 2025)

=== EPs ===
- Flags EP (Kitsuné, 22 January 2013)

=== Singles ===
- "When O' When" (2010)
- "South Pacific" (2010)
- "The Greeks" (2011)
- "Lies" (2011)
- "Dancing Anymore" (2013)
- "Lover's Cave" (2013)
