= I Love London =

Single by Crystal Fighters

from the album Star of Love
- Released: 1 December 2009
- Genre: Electronic
- Length: 2:47
- Label: Zirkulo
- Songwriter(s): Crystal Fighters
- Producer(s): Crystal Fighters

Crystal Fighters singles chronology
"Xtatic Truth" (2009)	"I Love London" (2009)	"In The Summer" (2010)

"I Love London" is the second single by English electronic band Crystal Fighters from their album Star of Love. The single was released on 1 December 2009 through Zirkulo records, to mixed reviews.

== Release ==
The track gained attention from BBC Radio 1, with plays from Nick Grimshaw and Rob da Bank. "I Love London" was featured in Mixmag's Top 100 Records of 2008, placing at number 91; this being particularly notable due to this being the only song in the list to have been unreleased at the time. The single was featured in Time Out magazine's "50 best London songs", coming in at number 49, with a justification as follows:

This deranged, stuttering ode to Crystal Fighters' adopted city of London does exactly what it says on the tin, the repeated near hysterical refrain, 'I wanna go to a friend's party', both refreshing in its cut-to-the-chase hedonistic desire and a reflection of the banality and boredom that relentless London partying inevitably brings".

— Time Out London,

The release was again licensed to Kitsuné and this time included in their Maison 8 compilation album. The Delta Heavy remix of the track can be heard in the 2009 Michael Caine action-drama, Harry Brown.

== Music video ==
Mimi Borrelli (former member of Crystal Fighters) features as the dancer in the video, which was directed by Martin Zahringer.

== Track listing ==
No.	Title	Length
1.	"I Love London"	02:47
2.	"I Love London" (80Kidz Remix)	05:55
3.	"I Love London" (Lorcan Mak Remix)	04:55
4.	"I Love London" (In Flagranti Dub Mix)	05:13
5.	"I Love London" (Qoso Remix)	06:05
6.	"I Love London" (Brackles Remix)	05:43
Total length:		30:38

== Reception ==
The song received mixed reviews. The Guardian (2011) commented:

'I Love London, while as silly ("Willesden! Harlesden! Watford Junction!") as anything here, has charm'

In his review of the original album release, Benjamin Hiorns of online music magazine Subba-Cultcha commented that:

'I Love London' however is the most irritating, hipster bullshit piece of ass I've heard in months which sums up in 3 ear raping minutes why I hate the London music scene and the record looses [sic] a whole point as a result (yes it really is THAT bad).

— Benjamin Hiorns,

When asked in an interview by Josh Holliday, of Virgin Media, as to the disparity between the album on the whole and this particular single, Pringle had the following comment:

We still love the track, and we did make a few songs that were more similar to it but it seemed like it would survive on its own but [sic] we wanted to make songs that were perhaps more conventional in their construction, incorporating more guitars etc. But yeah, in the future I think there'll be room for more single-orientated releases like 'I Love London'.

— Sebastian Pringle,
