= Xtatic Truth =

Single by Crystal Fighters

from the album Star of Love
- Released: 15 May 2009
- Genre: Electronic
- Length: 3:38
- Label: Zirkulo
- Songwriter(s): Crystal Fighters
- Producer(s): Crystal Fighters

Crystal Fighters singles chronology
"Xtatic Truth" (2009)	"I Love London" (2009)

"Xtatic Truth" is the début single by English electronic band Crystal Fighters from their album Star of Love. The single was released on 15 May 2009 through Zirkulo records to relatively good reviews.

== Remixes ==
Various versions of "Xtatic Truth" have been featured in compilation albums. The song was licensed to Kitsuné and the "Xtra Loud Mix" was included in their Maison Compilation 7 (2009) album and the "Magistrates remix" was included on the Annie Mac Presents 2009 compilation album.

The "Last Japan" Remix of the song was featured in series 4, episode 7 of the UK TV series Skins. Additionally, the album-only song "At Home" featured in series 5, episode 3. The song was also one of two played by the band on Later... with Jools Holland; the other being the unreleased "Champion Sound"; during the episode aired on 22 October 2010.

== Music video ==
The music video for "Xtatic Truth" was directed by James Spencer, produced by Nuala O'Leary and shot by Dan Stafford-Clark.

== Track listing ==
No.	Title	Length
1.	"Xtatic Truth" (Original)	03:38
2.	"Xtatic Truth" (Maybb Remix)	06:41
3.	"Xtatic Truth" (Magistrates Remix)	03:25
4.	"Xtatic Truth" (Renaissance Man Remix)	08:04
Total length:		21:48

== Reception ==
The single was relatively well received, coming to the attention of BBC Radio 1's Nick Grimshaw, who named it "Single of the Week"; NME, who listed it as number eight in their "10 Tracks You Have To Hear This Week"; Mixmag, who named it their electro record of the month; and Q magazine, who listed it at number 14 in their "Q50", October 2010.

The album was reviewed by Kevin Trotter, owner and editor of on-line music magazine The Beat Surrender. The single received a score of 3 out of 5, with Trotter citing:

The latest single from the group (Xtatic Truth) is better than most but is a bit of a disappointment for me. It's got a nice growly electro feel to it and everything seems to be in place, it's just the vocals don't do a great deal for me and lyric wise it's all a bit nothing.

— Kevin Trotter,
