= Jon Gooch =

British drum and bass, dubstep and electro house producer and DJ

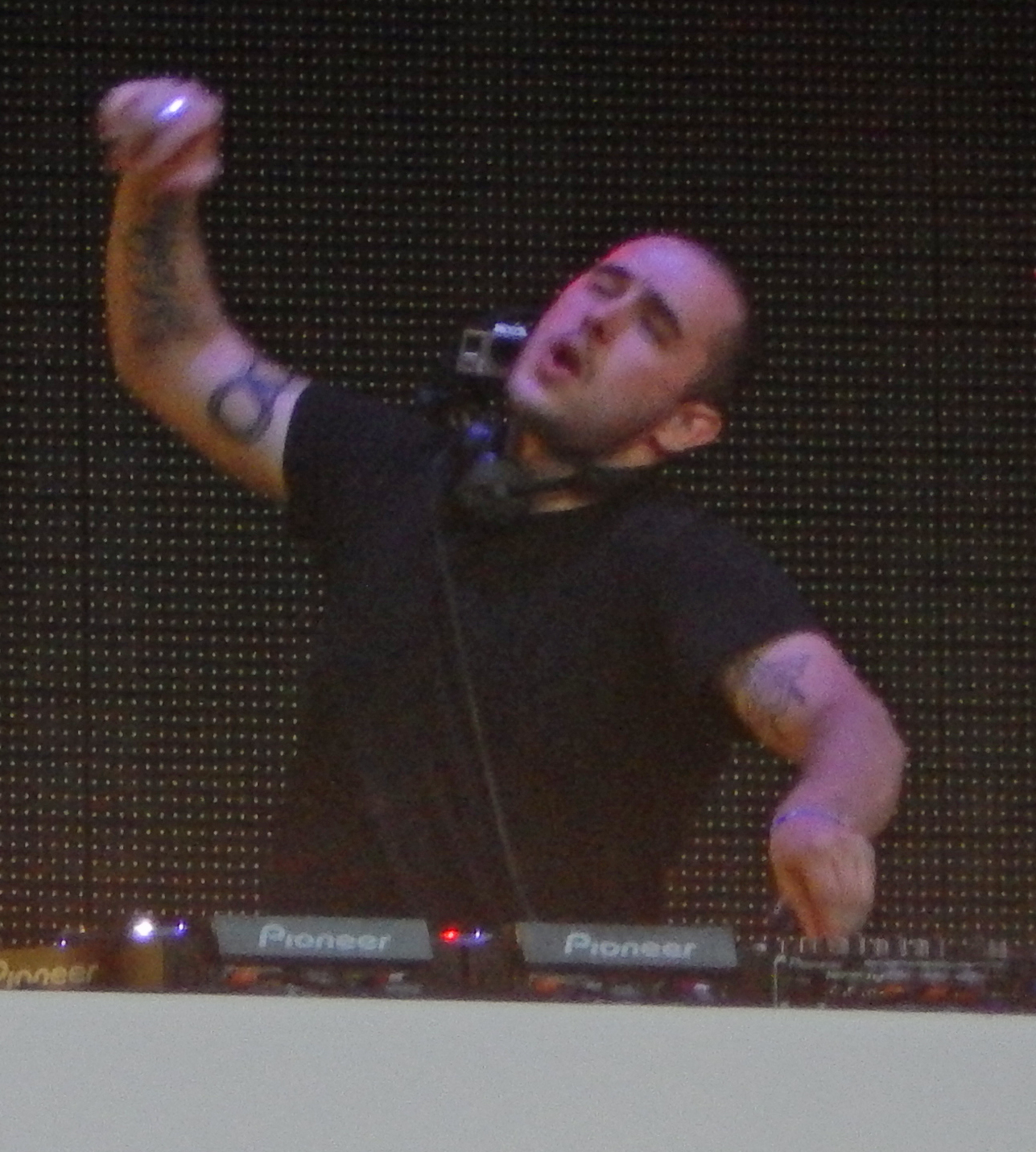
- Gooch performing as Feed Me in 2014

Background information
- Also known as: Feed Me; Spor; Unicron; Seventh Stitch; Snort & Leisure
- Born: Jonathan Gooch; 22 August 1984 (age 42); Hertfordshire, England
- Genres: Drum and bass; Dubstep; Electro house; Progressive house; Glitch hop
- Occupations: Record producer; DJ
- Years active: 2004–present
- Labels: mau5trap; Sotto Voce; Division; Monstercat
- Website: feedme.uk.com

Jonathan Barry Gooch (born 22 August 1984 in Hertfordshire, England), more commonly known by his stage names Feed Me, Spor and seventh stitch, is a British drum and bass, dubstep and electro house producer and DJ. He is currently managed by Three Six Zero Group.

== Biography ==
Jonathan Gooch first went by the name Spor when he started music production. After a successful partnership with Renegade Hardware and Barcode Recordings, and releases with Teebee's Subtitles Recordings, in 2006, Spor and long-term friend Chris Renegade launched Lifted Music and signed music from producers such as Apex, Evol Intent, Ewun and Phace.

On 24 February 2010, Spor released his second double EP, Conquerors and Commoners, on the Lifted Music label. In an interview with K Magazine, he said the title was inspired from a quote by Harlan Ellison. The album was well received by drum and bass fans, with two of the tracks from the album ("Halogen" and "Kingdom") being played on Andy C's Nightlife 5 mix CD. Spor has since then been playing his music at clubs across the world under the Lifted Music guise. Gooch was also involved in a second side project called the "Seventh Stitch", which produced alternative IDM. Under this alias, he worked with another artist named Andrew Aker on a track entitled "Oceans".

Gooch also has an electro house and dubstep project: Feed Me. A two-track EP titled "Raw Chicken" was released under deadmau5's label, mau5trap. Another track, "Mordez Moi" was released on Noisia's label Division alongside the group's original track "B.R.U.L.". He released a second EP under mau5trap on 25 December 2010, titled Feed Me's Big Adventure. It featured eight tracks, including both electro house and dubstep. His third EP of four tracks called To the Stars was released on 3 June 2011. He released another EP titled Feed Me's Escape From Electric Mountain on 6 February 2012. It features six tracks, with vocals from Hadouken! and Lindsay.

On 20 August 2012, Gooch released a new single titled "Little Cat Steps". Soon after, it was revealed he was producing a full-length album. On 28 October, he released another single with folk band Crystal Fighters, titled "Love Is All I Got". The EP also features four remixes, including Gooch's "Matilda" remix. On 20 December, he stated on Twitter, "One more single and two B sides, then it's album and tour time." The tracks were posted on his SoundCloud, and were titled "Death by Robot", "Dial-Up Days" and "Gravel". The Death by Robot EP was released on 16 January 2013.

On 22 May 2013 Gooch released a series of statements on his Twitter informing his fans that, come Autumn, there will be a hiatus in his DJing. He explained to his fans, 'What I really love doing is making music, art, telling stories; being creative. I don't want a situation where this becomes a back seat.' He later tweeted, 'Seems common to assume writing music means wanting to DJ – I started by accident? It's a fun and enriching social experience but not art.' He later confirmed via Facebook that he will resume touring in 2014 after he has spent time creating a short film featuring Feed Me, established his own label, working on artwork for his shows, and writing his next studio album.

Gooch has founded the record label Sotto Voce to release music under the Feed Me alias as well as provide a platform for new, aspiring artists to release their music. His debut studio album Calamari Tuesday was released on 14 October 2013 through the new label featuring 15 original tracks from his alias Feed Me, two of which were previously released as singles. It was revealed in an interview with DJ Mag that Gooch would like to release albums under each of his Spor, Feed Me and Seventh Stitch aliases in 2013.

Gooch has also appeared on the podcast/radio show DVDASA on 15 January 2014.

Gooch released "Caligo" as Spor on 19 February 2015 on his own label, Sotto Voce – the 13 track album was released via BitTorrent on a pay-what-you-want model, and included additional art and unreleased mix material.

Gooch (as Spor) collaborated with producer Linguistics for an addition to the compilation album "Mind State, Vol. 1" in 2018. The album's proceeds benefited mental health charities and was connected to a 24-hour mental health festival.

On 23 January 2019 Gooch announced via Twitter that a new album, titled "High Street Creeps", would be released on 22 February 2019 via mau5trap. The promotional single 'Feel Love' was released on 8 February 2019.

== Discography ==
=== As Feed Me ===
==== Charted studio albums ====
Title	Album details	Peak chart positions		
Title	Album details	US Indie	US Dance	US Heat
Calamari Tuesday	Released: 14 October 2013; Label: Sotto Voce; Formats: CD, Digital download	39	3	6

==== Charted extended plays ====
Year	Title	Peak chart positions		
Year	Title	US Indie	US Dance	US Heat
2012	Feed Me's Escape From Electric Mountain	38	13	5
2015	A Giant Warrior Descends on Tokyo	—	16	23
2016	Feed Me's Family Reunion	—	7	—

==== Charted singles ====
Year	Title	Peak chart positions				
Year	Title	BEL		GER	AUT	NL
Year	Title	V	W	GER	AUT	NL
2012	"Love Is All I Got" (with Crystal Fighters)	60	18	72	21	78

==== Releases ====
Year	Title	Type	Release Date	Label
2008	The Spell / Raw Chicken	Single	December 9, 2008	Mau5trap
2010	Feed Me's Big Adventure	EP	January 21, 2011	Mau5trap
2011	To the Stars	EP	July 1, 2011	Mau5trap
2012	Feed Me's Escape from Electric Mountain	EP	February 6, 2012	Mau5trap
2012	Little Cat Steps	Single	August 20, 2012	Mau5trap
2012	Love Is All I Got (with Crystal Fighters)	Single/EP	October 26, 2012	Mau5trap
2013	Death by Robot	Single/EP	January 16, 2013	Mau5trap
2013	Calamari Tuesday	Album	October 14, 2013	Sotto Voce
2014	Feed Me's Psychedelic Journey	EP	July 11, 2014	Sotto Voce
2014	Far Away (with Kill the Noise)	Single	October 23, 2014	Slow Roast Records, Sotto Voce
2015	A Giant Warrior Descends on Tokyo	EP	February 2, 2015	Sotto Voce
2016	Feed Me's Family Reunion	EP	July 8, 2016	Sotto Voce
2017	Feed Me's Existential Crisis	EP	May 19, 2017	Mau5trap
2019	Feel Love (featuring Rosie Doonan)	Single	February 8, 2019	Mau5trap
2019	Sleepless	Single	February 15, 2019	Mau5trap
2019	High Street Creeps	Album	February 22, 2019	Mau5trap
2019	Nothing Hurts Like You (featuring Sam Calver)	Single	November 22, 2019	Spinnin' Records
2019	Little Space (featuring Yosie)	Single	December 13, 2019	NIGHTMODE
2020	Money, Destiny	Single	March 12, 2020	Monstercat
2020	Coffee Black	Single	April 16, 2020	Monstercat
2020	New Shoes	Single	May 21, 2020	Monstercat
2020	Survive (with Flux Pavilion featuring Meesh)	Single	June 18, 2020	Circus Records
2021	Reckless (featuring Tasha Baxter)	Single	August 6, 2021	Sotto Voce
2021	Feed Me	Album	August 13, 2021	Sotto Voce
2022	Feeling So Free	Single	September 23, 2022	Terracotta Records
2023	Ghost Synths	Single	February 10, 2023	Terracotta Records
2023	Mirage (with Kill The Noise featuring Tasha Baxter)	Single	June 9, 2023	Ophelia Records
2023	Say Yes or Say No	Single	July 7, 2023	Ophelia Records
2023	Feed Me From The Clouds	EP	August 4, 2023	Ophelia Records
2023	One Real Antler, One Imagined	Single	December 7, 2023	Ophelia Records
2024	Calorific	Single	March 1, 2024	Sotto Voce
2024	If Only	Single	March 15, 2024	Sotto Voce
2024	Hyper Harmonic	Single	March 29, 2024	Sotto Voce
2024	Roadtrip Sleeper	Single	April 12, 2024	Sotto Voce
2024	I'll Be Good	Single	May 3, 2024	UKF
2024	Giant Creatures	Single	May 24, 2024	Sotto Voce
2024	Hopeless (with No Mana and Bertie Scott)	Single	May 29, 2024	Monstercat
2024	Feed Me's Vintage Rally Championship	EP	August 16, 2024	Sotto Voce
2024	One Click Headshot	Remix Album	December 13, 2024	Sotto Voce
2025	Pyro (featuring EMSKI)	Single	August 15, 2025	Sotto Voce
2025	Proud (with Lani Daye)	Single	September 5, 2025	Sotto Voce
2025	Felt Sick	Album	September 26, 2025	Sotto Voce
2026	Another Level (with Flux Pavilion and Kill the Noise)	Single	January 30, 2026	Sotto Voce
2026	Vice City (with Leo Leone)	Single	March 6, 2026	Sotto Voce
2026	Bad Taste	Single	July 24, 2026	UKF

==== Guest appearances ====
Year	Title	Appears on	Album artist	Catalogue number
2008	"Mordez Moi"	Mordez Moi / B.R.U.L.	Feed Me / Noisia	DIVISION003
2011	"Cott's Face"	Meowingtons Hax Tour Trax	Various Artists	MAU5CD008
2012	"Thumbs Up (For Rock n' Roll)"	Black Magic	Kill the Noise	OWS025
2015	"I Do Coke"	Occult Classic	Kill the Noise	OWS120
2025	"Pantheon II"	Pantheon II	Various Artists	OPH250D

==== Production credits ====
Year	Title	Artist	Album
2011	"Midnight Run"	Example	Playing in the Shadows
2011	"Bleeding Out"	Korn	The Path of Totality
2011	"Ebb & Flow" (Pop Mix / Freebee Mix)	Tasha Baxter	Ebb & Flow – Single
2011	"Ebb & Flow" (Original Mix)	Tasha Baxter	Ebb & Flow – Single
2011	"Bikes"	Tasha Baxter	Bikes – Single
2012	"Perfect Replacement"	Example	The Evolution of Man
2018	"24/7"	Foreign Beggars	2-2 Karma

==== Remixes ====
Year	Title	Original artist	Release
2008	"Knights of Cydonia" (Feed Me Remix)	Muse	—N/a
2009	"If You Knew" (Feed Me Remix)	Chris Lake feat. Nastala	If You Knew (single)
2009	"Until I Die" (Feed Me Remix)	September	Until I Die (single)
2009	"Morning After Dark" (Feed Me Remix)	Timbaland	Morning After Dark (Remixes)
2010	"On Melancholy Hill" (Feed Me Remix)	Gorillaz	The Vampire Diaries (Original Television Soundtrack)
2010	"Let You Go" (Feed Me Remix)	Chase & Status feat. Mali	Let You Go (single)
2011	"Call Your Girlfriend" (Feed Me Remix)	Robyn	Call Your Girlfriend (Remixes)
2011	"Innocence" (Feed Me Remix)	Nero	Guilt (EP)
2011	"What You Know" (Feed Me Cover)	Two Door Cinema Club	—N/a
2012	"Sail" (Feed Me Luxe Remix)	Awolnation	Kill Your Heroes (single)
2012	"Love Is All I Got" (Feed Me Matilda Remix)	Feed Me and Crystal Fighters	Love Is All I Got (single)
2013	"Messiah" (Feed Me Remix)	I See Monstas	Messiah (EP)
2013	"Soothe My Soul" (Feed Me Remix)	Depeche Mode	Soothe My Soul (download only)
2016	"I Do Coke" (Snort & Leisure [Kill The Noise & Feed Me] Remix)	Kill The Noise & Feed Me	Alt Classic (Remixes)
2016	"Strobe" (Feed Me Remix)	deadmau5	Strobe (Remixes)
2017	"Hurricane" (Feed Me Remix)	Vaults	Hurricane (Remixes/Pt.1)
2018	"Bad Dreams" (Feed Me Remix)	Pete Yorn & Scarlett Johansson	Bad Dreams (Feed Me Remix)
2020	"Silhouette" (Feed Me Remix)	Bad Computer featuring Skyelle	Rocket League x Monstercat – Legacy
2025	"Magic Armour" (Feed Me Remix)	Svdden Death	VOYD Vol. 2.5 (PART II)

=== As Spor and Unicron ===
- Spor – "Judderman" / "The Whisper" (2004) (DMIND008)
- Spor – "Running Man" (2004) (NITE002)
- Spor – "Outbroken (That Track)" (2004) (RH62)
- Spor – "Nebulous" (2004) (RH62CD)
- Spor – "Haywire" (2004) (RH63)
- Spor – "Three Ravens" (2004) (BAR04)
- Spor – "Insecticide" (2004) (TOV67)
- Unicron – "Orion's Five" (2005) (TOVLP06)
- Unknown Error / Unicron – "Shadows" (Unicron Remix) / "You Must Believe" (2005) (TOV69)
- Final Reckoning (Spor & Codex) – "Ghosthacker" (2005) (TOV71)
- Final Reckoning (Spor & Codex) – "Nothing Less" / "A Thousand Worlds" (2005) (TOV73)
- Spor – "Dante's Inferno" (2005) (BAR07)
- Spor – "Haunt Me" / "Brickbeats" (2005) (BAR08)
- Spor – "Way of the Samurai" (2005) (BARLP01)
- Spor – "Alpha Trion" (2005) (BARLP01CD)
- Spor – "Ultimate Technology" / "Cyberpunk" (2005) (BAR12)
- Spor – Tactics EP (2005) (RH72)
- Spor & Infiltrata – "Three Faces" (2006) (BAR14)
- Spor – "Ignition" (2006) (RH75/RHLP10)
- Spor – "Powder Monkey" (2006) (SUBTITLES055)
- Spor – "Knock You Down" (2006) (LFTD001)
- Spor – "Hydra" (2006) (ZIQ159)
- Spor – "Molehill" (2007) (SUBTITLES057)
- Spor – Supernova (2007) (LFTD002)
- Spor – From the Inside Out (with Apex, Ewun, Evol Intent & Phace) (2008) (LFTD003)
- Spor – Breath In, Scream Out EP. (2008) (SUBTITLES066)
- Spor – "Claret's March" / "Stoppit" (2008) (LFT005)
- Spor – "Aztec" / "Do Not Shake" (2009) (SHA025)
- Spor – "Silver Spaceman" / "Some Other Funk" (2009) (LFTD006)
- Spor – Conquerors & Commoners (2010) (LFTD009)
- Spor – "Knock You Down" (Eskmo Remix) (2010) (LFTDUB001)
- Noisia & Spor – "Falling Through" (2010) (VSN009)
- Spor – Pacifica EP (2011) (LFTDUB002)
- Phace & Spor – "Out of Focus" (2011) (NSGNLEP001)
- Spor – "Ziggurat" / "Push Me, Pull You" (2012) (LFTD013)
- Spor – Caligo (2015) (SOVO008)
- Spor – Black Eyed EP (2016) (SOVO012)
- Spor – "Pull the Sun Down" (with Linguistics) (part of a compilation) (2018) (GET001DD)
- Spor – "Anachronic" (2020)

Remixes

- Konflict – "Messiah" (Spor Remix) (2005) (RH65P/RHLP06)
- Ewun – "Hate Machine" (Spor Remix) (2006) (BARLP02)
- The Qemists – "Stompbox" (Spor Remix) (2007) (ZEN 205)
- Evol Intent feat. Ewun – "8-Bit Bitch" (Spor Remix) (2008) (EILP001/EIR 5694/SYS5686)
- Bad Company UK – "Bullet Time" (Spor Remix) (2009) (BT003)
- Basement Jaxx feat. Sam Sparro – "Feelings Gone" (Spor Remix) (2009) (XLS461)
- Muse – Resistance (Spor Remix) (2009)
- Two Fingers feat. Sway – "That Girl" (Spor Remix) (2009) (BD134)
- Don Diablo & Example – "Hooligans" (Spor Remix) (2009) (DATA219)
- Hadouken! – "Turn the Lights Out" (Spor Remix) (2009) (SN012)
- Noisia – "Machine Gun" (Spor Remix) (2010) (DIVISION005)
- The Prodigy – "Nasty" (Spor Remix) (2015)
- Vaults – "Lifespan" (Spor Remix) (2015)
- Kumarion – "Want It" (Spor Remix) (2020)
