= Occult Classic =

Studio album by Kill the Noise
- Released: 9 October 2015
- Recorded: 2013–15
- Genre: Dubstep; trap
- Length: 35:34
- Label: Owsla, Warner Music Group
- Producer: Jacob Stanczak

Kill the Noise chronology
Black Magic (2012)	Occult Classic (2015)	Alt Classic (2016)

Singles from Occult Classic
- 1. "Louder" Released: May 6, 2015; 2. "Kill It 4 the Kids" Released: September 1, 2015; 3. "Dolphin on Wheels" Released: September 17, 2015; 4. "Spitfire Riddim" Released: September 24, 2015; 5. "FUK UR MGMT" Released: September 29, 2015

Alternate cover
- Alt Classic cover

Occult Classic (stylised as OCCULT CLASSIC) is the debut studio album by American electronic music producer Kill the Noise. Occult Classic was released on 9 October 2015, by American electronic music label Owsla. Occult Classic was later followed up by a 15-track remix album titled Alt Classic (stylised as ALT CLASSIC) released on 13 May 2016.

== Background and composition ==
In an interview with Elias Leigh of Billboard, Stanczak commented on the start of the production process of Occult Classic, stating:

I started working on the album close to two years ago. I had been working on a bunch of new ideas, and I guess there was a point where I was like, "this is definitely something." The first nine months or so was just me really trying to find time to work in the studio -- I was doing a lot of touring. And after close to a year of trying to balance the two, I started to realize, if I'm really serious about putting an album together, I’ve got to pull myself off the road for a period of time to really go in and get a vibe.

In an interview with Dave Jenkins of UKF, Stanczak commented on the album title and artwork style, stating:

I had all these ideas and tried a bunch of things and wrote names and had it pretty much decided. I went through so many ideas over the last year and a half. I wanted something that lasted and was a bit clever. The thing is, if you follow my Kill The Noise stuff since 2007 you’ll know it's always changing. They're never a huge departures but they're clearly different directions.

In an interview with Nick Murray of Rolling Stone, Stanczak commented on his musical direction he has taken for Occult Classic, stating:

I had ended up in a place where I started feeling like I was rewriting stuff that I'd already done before. There's all these demos that I had been writing that I had been afraid to put more time into because I didn't feel like it was stuff that people would understand. Especially in dance music, people just want to get their head blown off in the first 15 seconds. Creatively, that's just a really restrictive place to be.

On 4 April 2015, OWSLA released a collaboration between Kill the Noise and Feed Me titled I Do Coke as the first single from Stanczak's upcoming album, Occult Classic. The song was released alongside a music video directed by Brandon Dermer, produced by Anthem Films, and stars Tom Sandoval as a cocaine abuser. which was criticised for its glorification of drug usage. Stanczak clarified the music video's intentions, stating:

In this story, the message is that if you aren't careful, you can become figuratively (and literally) consumed by your lifestyle of addiction. The main character in this story has found himself stuck on an endless merry-go-round that goes nowhere.

Kill the Noise and Feed Me – "I Do Coke"
I Do Coke repeats the lyrics "I do coke... so I can work longer... so I can earn more... so I can do more coke." throughout the song.

== Reception and release ==
EDM.com reviewed "Kill It 4 The Kids", stating "The track is a headbanging piece of EDM thrash, featuring his heavily distorted signature synth work, hard-hitting trap beats, and shouted vocal samples".

Michael Sundius of Dancing Astronaut described "I Do Coke"'s music video a "stirring visual narrative to the song's oft-overlooked satire", stating: "As you'd expected from the off-kilter collaboration, the video is a dark, drug-induced thrill ride that only gets stranger as it goes on". On the other hand, David Klemow described "Dolphin on Wheels" as "an entire season of Spongebob Squarepants packed into a song", further stating: "Kill The Noise reserves a spot on his introductory record for a quick little jab at electronic music, pulling in perennial prankster Dillon Francis on the gag". Lucas Sachs of Your EDM described the song as Dolphinstep and noted the song for its "Skrillex-esque bounce vibe".

Marcus Dowling of LessThan3 generally liked the album, stating: "When veteran DJs become inventive producers, the opportunity for well-delivered, sometimes fanciful, and consistently fantastic productions emerges. On Occult Classic, Kill The Noise turns left, shoots straight, and never stops scoring. As a result, this album never stops winning".

Jonah Berry of NEST HQ praised the album, stating: "At its core, OCCULT CLASSIC is an accurate projection of who Kill The Noise is as an artist — complex, loud, witty, and tenacious. The sounds are as genuine as his Twitter feed. Nothing is pretentious. Nothing is misrepresentative. A lot of work went into this album, and it shows. Congratulations on a top-notch debut record, Jake".

Miguel Tost of Your EDM stated: "What we have with Occult Classic is a soundscape filled with years of refining a craft diligently and effortfully. Tying together ten tracks of varying sub-genres is no simple feat and yet Kill The Noise does so in a way that doesn't reimagine electronic music, but does voyage as far as his musical creativity can. What makes Occult Classic a great album is that it sets a high standard for Kill The Noise and his future works".

== Alt Classic ==
On 13 May 2016, a remix album of Occult Classic titled Alt Classic was released by OWSLA. The remix album featured 15 remixes from various artists, including remixes from electronic producers Getter, Virtual Riot, Snails and Wuki.

Hunter Thompson of Run The Trap generally liked Getter's remix of "Mine", stating "With aggressive synths and slapping percussion Getter does the original justice while adding his own unique flavour".

Fraser of This Song Slaps reviewed Kill the Noise and Virtual Riot's remix of "Without a Trace", stating "Both artists really let their styles shine and the bass growls packed into this one is not for the faint of heart. If dubstep is your jam then you are seriously going to enjoy this one". Virtual Riot commented about the production process of his and Kill the Noise's remix of "Without a Trace", stating:

Doing the remix with Jake was huge fun. I would come over to his house a few days in a row, pet his cats and work on the remix with him. I started it off with an idea on my laptop, then we moved the project over onto his NASA-grade Mac and continued there. Jake has a great workflow and together we worked really dynamic and efficient, bouncing around a lot of different ideas for sounds and patterns but also keeping each other from overthinking it.

Jesse Champagne of LessThan3 described Wuki's remix of "FUK UR MGMT" as a "booming, speaker-bursting, eardrum-destroying onslaught of festival-and-whip-friendly trap that will have you throwing up the two-fingered salute at management".

Shaun of That Drop praised the diversity in Alt Classic, stating "From dubstep, to trap, to bass house, to happy hardcore, this remix album takes many different directions often allowing producers to step out of their comfort zone and try a different genre that they have previously not produced".

=== Rezz remix ===
On 27 May 2016, Canadian electronic producer Isabelle Rezazadeh, commonly known as her stage name, Rezz, released her remix of "Without a Trace". The song was released as a free download by Stanczak as an expression of gratitude towards his fans for the support on both Occult Classic and Alt Classic. Rezazadeh commented on the start of the production process of the remix, stating:

I’ve loved his version of the song ever since it came out. I was totally in love with the vocal. I never thought I'd have the opportunity to remix it but I simply asked KTN for the stems and he gave them to me. I wanted to make a more chill approach to the song as that's how the vocal made me feel.

Matthew Meadow of Your EDM praised Rezazadeh's use of the original song's vocals, stating "The way the track is arranged, rather than a featured vocalist, it sounds like Rezz has crafted the remix around the vocals, which is a stark contrast to the original". Jamie Lamberski of EDM.com stated "REZZ's version brings new life to the track with its simple, driving arrangement that is epically beautiful all while slightly dysphoric". Cassie Sheets of NEST HQ praised the remix, stating "In its entirety, the remix is a brilliant use of her dark techno design merged with half-time dubstep elements. It's quite a different approach from REZZ, feeling inexplicably gentle. Although, she has a habit of making you feel safe before her music typically throws you off a cliff".

== Track listing ==
=== Occult Classic ===
No.	Title	Length
1.	"Kill It 4 the Kids" (featuring AWOLNATION and Rock City)	2:23
2.	"FUK UR MGMT"	3:47
3.	"Mine" (featuring Bryn Christopher)	2:56
4.	"I Do Coke" (with Feed Me)	3:46
5.	"Without a Trace" (featuring Stalking Gia)	4:03
6.	"Louder" (with Tommy Trash, featuring Rock City)	3:31
7.	"Dolphin on Wheels" (with Dillon Francis)	2:54
8.	"Lose Ya Love"	3:49
9.	"Spitfire Riddim" (with Madsonik featuring twoton)	3:59
10.	"All in My Head" (featuring AWOLNATION)	4:26
Total length:		35:34

=== Alt Classic ===
No.	Title	Length
1.	"Kill It 4 The Kids" (featuring AWOLNATION and Rock City, Nom De Strip Remix)	3:30
2.	"Fuk Ur Mgmt" (Snails Remix)	2:27
3.	"Fuk Ur Mgmt" (Wuki Remix)	3:16
4.	"I Do Coke" (with Feed Me, Ephwurd Remix)	3:51
5.	"I Do Coke" (with Feed Me, Snort and Leisure Remix)	4:21
6.	"Mine" (featuring Bryn Christopher, Getter Remix)	3:21
7.	"Without a Trace" (featuring Stalking Gia, Kill the Noise and Virtual Riot Remix)	5:26
8.	"Without a Trace" (featuring Stalking Gia, LOUDPVCK Remix)	3:46
9.	"Lose Ya Love" (Busted by Herobust)	3:35
10.	"Dolphin On Wheels" (with Dillon Francis, Moksi Remix)	3:35
11.	"Dolphin On Wheels" (with Dillon Francis, Rickyxsan Remix)	2:38
12.	"Louder" (with Tommy Trash, featuring R. City, Twine Remix)	3:50
13.	"Spitfire Riddim" (with Madsonik, featuring twoton, Boombox Cartel Remix)	4:25
14.	"All In My Head" (featuring AWOLNATION, Darren Styles and Gammer Remix)	5:10
15.	"All In My Head" (featuring AWOLNATION, Team EZY Remix)	2:53
Total length:		56:04

=== Rezz Remix ===
No.	Title	Length
1.	"Without a Trace" (featuring Stalking Gia, Rezz Remix)	3:31
Total length:		3:31

== Chart history ==
=== Occult Classic ===
Chart (2015)	Peak position
US Top Dance/Electronic Albums (Billboard)	7
US Heatseekers (Billboard)	6
US Independent Albums (Billboard)	45

=== Alt Classic ===
Chart (2015)	Peak position
US Top Dance/Electronic Albums (Billboard)	24

== Release history ==
Region	Date	Format	Version	Label	Ref.
United States	9 October 2015	Digital download	Occult Classic	Owsla	
United States	13 May 2016	Digital download	Alt Classic	Owsla	
United States	27 May 2016	Digital download	Without a Trace (Rezz Remix)	Owsla	
