= Love Is All I Got =

Single by Feed Me & Crystal Fighters

from the album Calamari Tuesday
- Released: 26 October 2012
- Genre: Electro house, folktronica, dubstep, drum and bass
- Length: 3:06
- Label: mau5trap
- Songwriters: Sebastian Pringle, Gilbert Vierich, Graham Dickson, Jon Gooch, John Donigan

Feed Me singles chronology
"Little Cat Steps" (2012)	"Love Is All I Got" (2012)	"Death By Robot" (2013)

Crystal Fighters singles chronology
"Plage" (2011)	"Love Is All I Got" (2012)	"You & I" (2013)

"Love Is All I Got" is a song by electronic musicians Feed Me and Crystal Fighters. It was written by Sebastian Pringle, Gilbert Vierich, Graham Dickson, and Jon Gooch.

It was digitally released as a single on 26 October 2012 by mau5trap.

== Critical reception ==
Reed Tan of The Daily Princetonian said the track "features Feed Me operating in a brighter space than he’s usually prone to occupying – the Crystal Fighters' vocals take center stage until the drop, where Feed Me's signature grinding bass sounds still manage to feel uplifting."

== Music video ==
The music video for the song premiered on 19 September 2012. It was directed by Christopher Barrett and Luke Taylor, and is starring Christian Kinde and Alexandra Dowling. As of November 2022, it has over 7.9 million views on YouTube.

== Track listing ==
Digital download - EP
No.	Title	Length
1.	"Love Is All I Got"	3:06
2.	"Love Is All I Got" (Feed Me's Matilda Remix)	5:40
3.	"Love Is All I Got" (Friction Remix)	3:48
4.	"Love Is All I Got" (Larse Remix)	7:04
5.	"Love Is All I Got" (Alex Light Remix)	3:42

== Charts ==
Chart (2012–2013)	Peak position
Australia (ARIA)	64
Austria (Ö3 Austria Top 40)	21
Belgium (Ultratip Bubbling Under Flanders)	60
Belgium (Ultratop Flanders Dance Bubbling Under)	17
Belgium (Ultratip Bubbling Under Wallonia)	18
Belgium (Ultratop Wallonia Dance Bubbling Under)	1
Czech Republic Airplay (ČNS IFPI)	27
Germany (GfK)	72
Italy (FIMI)	89
Netherlands (Mega Dance Top 30)	13
Netherlands (Single Top 100)	78
Netherlands (Mega Top 50)	20
UK Dance (Official Charts Company)	27
UK Singles (Official Charts Company)	123
US Dance/Electronic Singles Sales (Billboard)	7
US Hot Singles Sales (Billboard)	16

== Release history ==
Region	Date	Format	Label
Belgium	26 October 2012	Digital download	Mau5trap
Ireland	26 October 2012	Digital download	Mau5trap
Luxemburg	26 October 2012	Digital download	Mau5trap
Netherlands	26 October 2012	Digital download	Mau5trap
Norway	26 October 2012	Digital download	Mau5trap
Sweden	26 October 2012	Digital download	Mau5trap
United Kingdom	28 October 2012	Digital download	Mau5trap
France	29 October 2012	Digital download	Mau5trap
Singapore	29 October 2012	Digital download	Mau5trap
Canada	30 October 2012	Digital download	Mau5trap
Spain	30 October 2012	Digital download	Mau5trap
Australia	2 November 2012	Digital download	Mau5trap
Austria	2 November 2012	Digital download	Mau5trap
Finland	2 November 2012	Digital download	Mau5trap
Germany	2 November 2012	Digital download	Mau5trap
Italy	2 November 2012	Digital download	Mau5trap
New Zealand	2 November 2012	Digital download	Mau5trap
Switzerland	2 November 2012	Digital download	Mau5trap
United States	29 January 2013	Digital download	Mau5trap
