= Star of Love =

Studio album by Crystal Fighters
- Released: 4 October 2010
- Genres: Folktronica, alternative dance
- Length: 42:35
- Label: Zirkulo
- Producers: Graham Dickson, Sebastian Pringle, Gilbert Vierich

Crystal Fighters chronology
Star of Love (2010)	Cave Rave (2013)

Singles from Star of Love
- 1. "Xtatic Truth" Released: 15 May 2009; 2. "I Love London" Released: 1 December 2009; 3. "In the Summer" Released: 5 July 2010; 4. "Follow / Swallow" Released: 27 September 2010; 5. "At Home" Released: 7 March 2011; 6. "Plage" Released: 8 August 2011

Star of Love is the debut studio album by English-Spanish electronic music band Crystal Fighters. It was originally released on 4 October 2010 on their label, Zirkulo. The album combines genres from Basque folk to straight electronic and dubstep. Two special releases followed in 2011: an Australian limited edition, which included a bonus disc of acoustic remixes, and a worldwide deluxe edition, which included the acoustic tracks and an additional track.

The album charted in the United Kingdom and Belgium. Its singles have received attention from musicians and producers, who have remixed the tracks; some were selected by the band for its compilation album, Star of Love Remixes, which was released on 23 September 2012.

== Development ==
The album drew inspiration from singer Laure Stockley's grandfather's writings; its press release mentions "the unfathomable mystery of the universe, the turbulent journey towards being at peace with death, the triumph of love, and the omnipotence of the sun". The band used synthesizers and guitars, along with traditional Basque instruments: txalaparta, danbolin and txistu. Sebastian Pringle said that the album songs had been ready for a while, but that they made sure the songs "somehow linked in with one another even though there's a slew of mad genres going on." Pringle also mentions three of the members wrote most of the album at a warehouse at home. The name of the album is a backronym of SOL, the Spanish word for "sun".

== Artwork ==
The album artwork was done by London-based painter John Stark, who did the cover for Commix's Call to Mind album in 2007. It was an oil painting done on wood panel, and is "slightly larger" than the 12-inch cover. Stark focused on the band's Basque theme, and also added "gothic overtones and technique" characteristic of his work. The painting took six weeks to complete. The lettering was done by a different artist.

== Release ==
Star of Love was released on 4 October 2010.

On 4 February 2011, Crystal Fighters released a "Limited Edition" version of the album in Australia. It featured a bonus CD that consisted of five acoustic tracks.

On 8 August, Crystal Fighters released the "Deluxe Edition" worldwide. The album included the tracks from the Australian limited edition, and a cover track of "Fiesta de los Maniquíes", a Spanish song by 1980s synthpop group Golpes Bajos.

On 23 September 2012, Crystal Fighters released their Star of Love Remixes album, which contains 15 remixes of 7 tracks on their original album. They asked their favourite producers and artists to contribute.

== Critical reception ==
Original Edition
Review scores
Source	Rating
BBC Music	Favourable
The Brag	1.5/5 stars
Drowned in Sound	(7/10)
The Fly	3.5/5 stars
Metro	4/5 stars
MusicOMH	3/5 stars
NME	Unfavourable
The Skinny	2/5 stars
Virgin Media	(10/10)

The album scored a 6/10 on AnyDecentMusic?'s reviews aggregator, with 12 independent reviewers. Caitlin Welsh of The Brag called the album "exhaustingly dull" and "trying too hard to fit into every possible current genre". Alex Hoban of NME was equally critical: "With Delorean doing the same thing right now so much better, favouring Crystal Fighters would be like being handed an LCD Soundsystem record and chucking it to listen to Hadouken!."

The album received a few positive reviews. Josh Holliday of Virgin Media gave the album a 10/10, and called it "an eclectic barrage of contrasting, and often cacophonously clashing genre combinations...it's this constant flittering and fidgeting between reality and surrealism, fact and fiction, British and Basque that propels Crystal Fighters into mythical realms". Stephen Jones of the British newspaper Metro also praised the album: "On paper, Crystal Fighters' self-produced 'fast dance music', melding Basque folk instruments and thumping electro punk pop with lyrics from singer Laure's grandfather's addled writings, sounds like a disaster. In reality it works." James Hull of The AU Review was "thrilled" with the limited-edition album and "its smile inducing sounds."

On 8 August 2011, BBC 6 Music listed Star of Love as an Album of the Day.

=== Deluxe Edition ===
Deluxe Edition
Review scores
Source	Rating
Glasswerk	Favourable
The Guardian	2/5 stars
Halesowen News	(7/10)
The Line of Best Fit	Favourable
Metro	4/5 stars
The Music Fix	(5/10)
Virgin Media	Favourable
Yorkshire Post	Favourable

Following the Deluxe Edition's release, the Metro UK newspaper commented that "The five additional acoustic tracks emphasise [the band's] Latin roots, and the dreamy sentiments within the shouty fun, particularly on 'Champion Sound'." However, Jen Long, of BBC Radio 1, wrote in the on-line music magazine The Line of Best Fit: "Well, as pretty as they are, it's just a bit pointless really. The original album is fine fun on its own."

== Track listing ==
All tracks are written by Graham Dickson, Sebastian Pringle and Gilbert Vierich.

No.	Title	Additional production	Length
1.	"Solar System"		3:58
2.	"Xtatic Truth"		3:38
3.	"I Do This Everyday"	Charlie Hugall	3:45
4.	"Champion Sound" (Alt. version)	Crystal Fighters, Luke Smith	3:25
5.	"Plage"	Hugall, Crystal Fighters	3:50
6.	"In the Summer"	Hugall	3:56
7.	"At Home"	Hugall	5:06
8.	"I Love London"		2:47
9.	"Swallow"	Hugall	4:31
10.	"With You"	Hugall	4:23
11.	"Follow"	Hugall	3:16
Total length:			42:35

Australian limited edition second disc
No.	Title	Length
1.	"At Home" (Acoustic)	5:10
2.	"Xtatic Truth" (Acoustic Spanish version)	2:51
3.	"Plage" (Acoustic)	4:11
4.	"Champion Sound" (Acoustic)	3:52
5.	"Follow" (Acoustic)	3:19
Total length:		19:23

Deluxe edition
No.	Title	Additional production	Length
1.	"Solar System"		3:58
2.	"Follow"	Hugall	3:16
3.	"Xtatic Truth"		3:38
4.	"I Do This Everyday"	Charlie Hugall	3:45
5.	"Champion Sound" (Alt. version)	Crystal Fighters, Luke Smith	3:25
6.	"Plage"	Hugall, Crystal Fighters	3:50
7.	"In the Summer"	Hugall	3:56
8.	"At Home"	Hugall	5:06
9.	"I Love London"		2:47
10.	"Swallow"	Hugall	4:31
11.	"With You"	Hugall	4:23
12.	"Fiesta" (De Los Maniquies)		3:03
13.	"Follow" (acoustic)		3:17
14.	"Xtatic Truth" (acoustic – version Espanyol)		2:50
15.	"Champion Sound" (acoustic)		3:50
16.	"Plage" (acoustic)		4:09
17.	"At Home" (acoustic)		5:10
Total length:			64:54

== Personnel ==
In addition to Graham Dickson, Sebastian Pringle, and Gilbert Vierich, the following musicians and crew members were listed in the album's credits for the original release.

- Mimi Borrelli – vocals on all tracks except 1, 2, 4, 5 & 11
- Laure Stockley – vocals on all tracks except 1, 3, 4, 5 & 8
- Chris Hugall – drums on all track except 2, 4 & 8
- G. De Castro & A. Mcdowell – vocals on all tracks except 1, 4 & 7
- M Lozano & L. Youngman – vocals on track 6
- Charlie Hugall – additional recording on all tracks except 1, 2, 4 & 8; mixing on all tracks except 1, 2, 3, 4 & 8
- Adam Looker – additional recording on tracks 5 & 6; mixing on track 6

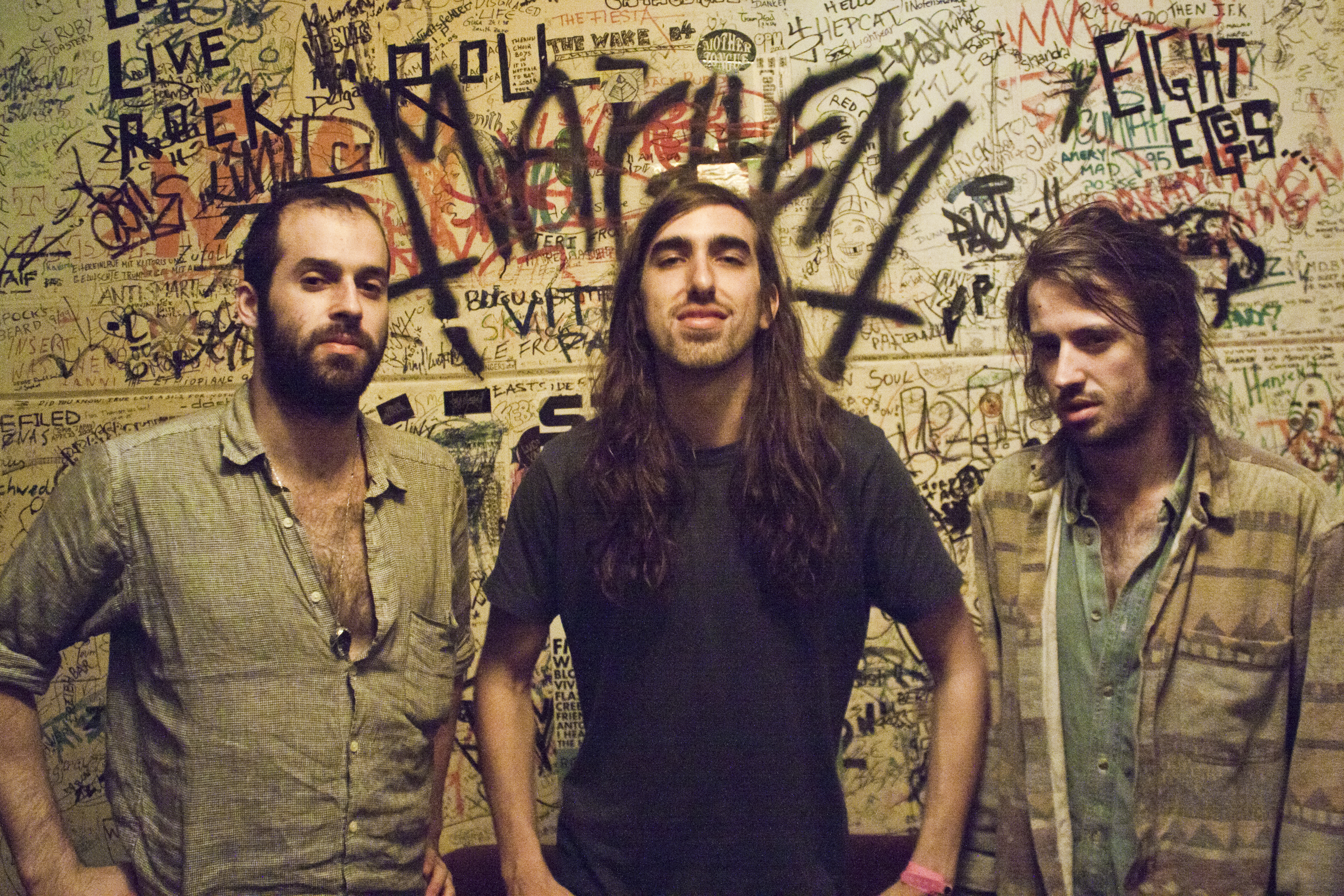
Crystal Fighters in Salzburg, 2011

- Crystal Fighters – mixing on all tracks (tracks 2 and 8 mixed at the Crystal Ballroom)
- Alan O'Connell (Alalal) – mixing on tracks 1, 3 & 6
- Luke Smith – mixing on track 4
- Stuart Hawkes (of Metropolis Mastering) – mastering on all tracks
- John Stark – cover painting
- Tim Green – design & art direction

== Charts ==
Chart (2010–12)	Peak position
Australian Hitseekers Albums Chart	16
Belgian Alternative Albums Chart (Flanders)	47
Belgian Heatseekers Albums Chart (Flanders)	6
Belgian Albums Chart (Wallonia)	89
Dutch Albums Chart	36
French Albums Chart	200
UK Dance Albums Chart	10
UK Independent Albums Breakers Chart	16
