= Cave Rave =

Studio album by Crystal Fighters
- Released: 24 May 2013
- Genres: Folktronica, alternative dance
- Length: 37:46
- Label: Zirkulo
- Producers: Crystal Fighters, Justin Meldal-Johnson

Crystal Fighters chronology
Star of Love (2010)	Cave Rave (2013)	Everything Is My Family (2016)

Singles from Cave Rave
- 1. "You & I" Released: 23 April 2013; 2. "LA Calling" Released: 29 September 2013; 3. "Love Natural" Released: 15 December 2013

Cave Rave is the second studio album by English/Spanish electronic music band Crystal Fighters, released on 24 May 2013 on their label, Zirkulo. The album consists of a mix of genres from Basque folk to straight electronic and dubstep. It was preceded by the official release of the single "You & I" as well as the airing and/or online streaming of the first four tracks

== Development ==
The album was recorded in Los Angeles. It was produced by Justin Meldal-Johnson, and mixed by Manny Marroquin in LA.

== Artwork ==
The album artwork was created for the band by artist Paul Laffoley, and was unveiled on Jay-Z's Life + Times website on 18 February 2013.

== Release ==
The band released a preview clip of "Wave" on 6 February 2013. On 18 February, they announced the release of Cave Rave, a larger tour in Europe and a tour across North America, and posted the song Separator on YouTube. The official video for "Separator" was posted on YouTube on 8 April. The official video for "You & I" was posted on YouTube on 23 April. The track "LA Calling" was streamed on the official Crystal Fighters website on 14 May.

"You & I" is the album's official lead single. The song was debuted on BBC Radio 1's Zane Lowe show as the "Hottest Record in the World". Subsequently, it has been added to BBC Radio 1's playlist and 3FM in the Netherlands' playlist as MEGAHIT. The video was directed by Elliot Sellers and was premiered on Vice Noisey. Sunless 97 remix was premiered on FADER (magazine), and Gigamesh remix was premiered on Vibe Magazine.

On 14 May 2013 The Guardian announced Crystal Fighters plans to hold a 'Cave Rave' in the heart of the Basque countryside on 29 August 2013.

"LA Calling" was the second single to be aired from the Cave Rave album. The Guardian published a link to "LA Calling" on 13 May 2013.

"You & I" was added to BBC Radio 1's B List on 5 June 2013.

“Love Natural” features in the video game FIFA 14.

== Composition ==
On 9 May 2013, on This Is Fake DIY, lead singer Sebastian Pringle gave a track-by-track guide to the album .

== Critical reception ==
Professional ratings
Aggregate scores
Source	Rating
Metacritic	58/100
Review scores
Source	Rating
Allmusic	3.5/5 stars
Consequence of Sound	3.5/5 stars
Evening Standard	4/5 stars
The Guardian	2/5 stars
The Independent	3/5 stars
musicOMH	3.5/5 stars
NME	5/10
This Is Fake DIY	7/10
Time Out London	2/5 stars

The album was positively received by critics. upon release. The Times newspaper called the album "overwhelmingly infectious" in a 4/5 review; The Line of Best Fit awarded the album 8.5/10 and called it "a delirious pleasure"; The 405 website said it "a perfect companion for sizzling meat and endless sunsets"; Aesthetica called it "a collection of enlightening anthems that will inspire listeners to keep dancing all night"; The Big Issue said the album is "like an upbeat Arcade Fire"; Huffington Post said the album is "bursting with so much life and euphoria." The Evening Standard described the album as "...abound of a deep love of Basque culture and the occasional splash of tequila. Take this CD on holiday, or, even better, see them live."

== Track listing ==
All tracks are written by Crystal Fighters.

No.	Title	Length
1.	"Wave"	3:30
2.	"LA Calling"	3:49
3.	"You & I"	3:30
4.	"Separator"	4:08
5.	"No Man"	3:42
6.	"Bridge of Bones"	5:39
7.	"Love Natural"	3:19
8.	"Are We One"	3:35
9.	"These Nights"	3:19
10.	"Everywhere"	3:15

== Personnel ==
Credits for Crystal Fighters adapted from liner notes.

Crystal Fighters

- Crystal Fighters – additional production
- Sebastian Pringle – vocals, acoustic guitar, backing vocals, bass guitar, charango, classical guitar, electric guitar, kalimba, keyboards, percussion, programming, txalaparta, txistu, ukulele
- Gilbert Vierich – vocals, acoustic guitar, backing vocals, bass guitar, charango, classical guitar, electric guitar, kalimba, keyboards, percussion, programming, txalaparta, txistu, ukulele
- Graham Dickson – vocals, acoustic guitar, backing vocals, bass guitar, charango, classical guitar, electric guitar, kalimba, keyboards, percussion, programming, txalaparta, txistu, ukulele
- Andrea Marongiu – drums, percussion
- Eleanor Fletcher – backing vocals

Additional personnel

- Todd Burke – engineering
- Kristian Donaldson – engineering
- Chris Gehringer – mastering
- Tim Green – design
- Lauren Johnson – backing vocals
- Paul Laffoley – album cover
- Manny Marroquin – mixing
- Andrew McDonnell – engineering
- Justin Meldal-Johnsen – bass guitar, electric guitar, engineering, keyboards, percussion, production, programming
- Nila Raja – backing vocals
- Shaun Savage – engineering
- Mike Schuppan – engineering
- Chris Testa – engineering
- Holly Walker – backing vocals
- Patrick Warren – piano
- Lionel Williams – inside cover
- Hugh Worskett – pre-production
- Sigrid Zeiner-Gundersen – backing vocals
- Luzmira Zerpa – backing vocals

== Charts ==
Chart (2013)	Peak position
Australian Hitseekers Albums Chart	9
Austrian Albums Chart	60
Belgian Albums Chart (Flanders)	76
Belgian Albums Chart (Wallonia)	122
Dutch Albums Chart	61
Spanish Albums Chart	86
Swiss Albums Chart	77
UK Albums Chart	87
UK Indie Albums Chart	20
US Top Heatseekers Albums	27

== Release history ==
Region	Date	Label
Australia	24 May 2013	[PIAS] Australia
Germany	24 May 2013	Different Recordings
United Kingdom	27 May 2013	Zirkulo
United States	28 May 2013	Atlantic Records

== Cave Rave event ==
On Tuesday 14 May 2013 The Guardian announced Crystal Fighters plans to hold a "cave rave" in the heart of the Basque countryside on 29 August 2013.

The Cave Rave event took place on Thursday 29 August at Zugarramurdi cave outside San Sebastian, deep within the band's spiritual home of the Basque countryside. New wavers Belako and party-starting six piece Wilhelm & The Dancing Animals opened the show and warmed up the crowd before Crystal Fighters took to the stage. The show was sold out and the review were all extremely positive with coverages on the Rolling Stone, El Pais and many other relevant blogs online.
