= Plage (song) =

Single by Crystal Fighters

from the album Star of Love
- Released: 8 August 2011
- Genre: Electronic
- Length: 3:36
- Label: Zirkulo
- Songwriter(s): Crystal Fighters
- Producer(s): Crystal Fighters

Crystal Fighters singles chronology
"At Home" (2011)	"Plage" (2011)	"Love Is All I Got" (2012)

"Plage" is the sixth single by English electronic band Crystal Fighters from their album Star of Love. The single was released on 8 August 2011 through Zirkulo records, to positive reviews.

== Release ==
The release of this single coincided with the release of the "Deluxe Edition" of the album. The single was released through PIAS to the continental European market earlier in the year to both positive reviews and chart success in the Netherlands.

An acoustic version of the song was recorded on the UK TV show, "Abbey Road Debuts", produced by Channel 4 and aired in April 2011. The song also featured in a TV advert named "Forever Spring" for UK clothing retailer Matalan as well as another for US retail corporation Target and the UK's Sky.

== Music video ==
The music video for this single features live footage of Crystal Fighters from their 2010 / 2011 tour, with footage from Belgium, UK, Spain and Mexico.

== Track listing ==
No.	Title	Length
1.	"Plage"	03:52
2.	"Plage" (Compuphonic Remix)	05:30
3.	"Plage" (Mashed Paper Klub Remix)	05:02
4.	"Plage" (Acoustic)	04:09
Total length:		18:33

== Reception ==
Whiteboard music awarded the single 8.7 out of 10, citing that the single "is an extraordinarily pleasant breath of fresh air into the current indie music scene".

On-line music magazine, This is Fake DIY, states:

Releasing the song when they have is a smart move on the band's part; musically, it's got just the right sun-kissed, excitable tone for the summer time, along with some very festival-sing-a-long-friendly lyrics. 'Plage' is a catchy, fun pop single, more than ready to get stuck in that sun-burnt bonce of yours.

— Tom Baker

It was named by on-line music magazine, The Music fix, as a "single of the week" on 7 August 2011.

== Usage in other media ==
The song is used in the trailer for the 2013 DreamWorks film The Croods.

== Charts ==
=== Weekly charts ===
Chart (2011)	Peak position
Netherlands (Dutch Top 40)	12
Netherlands (Single Top 100)	9
Dutch Download Top 50	9
3FM Mega Top 50	4

=== Year-end charts ===
Chart (2011)	Position
Netherlands (Dutch Top 40)	26
Netherlands (Single Top 100)	30
