= Everything Is My Family =

Studio album by Crystal Fighters
- Released: 21 October 2016
- Genres: Folktronica; alternative dance; indie rock
- Label: Zirkulo under license to Play It Again Sam
- Producer: Crystal Fighters

Crystal Fighters chronology
Cave Rave (2013)	Everything Is My Family (2016)

Singles from Everything Is My Family
- 1. "All Night" Released: 17 August 2016; 2. "Good Girls" Released: 13 October 2016; 3. "Lay Low" Released: 18 October 2016

Everything Is My Family is the third studio album from the multi-national based band Crystal Fighters, released on 21 October 2016 via Zirkulo & Play It Again Sam records. As with the band's previous albums, Everything Is My Family includes songs inspired by Spanish, Basque folk music but also takes influence from a range of genres. The band said in a September, 2016 interview to expect, more dance floor, more psychedelia, more tropical, more rave. In advance of the album's release, Crystal Fighters released three singles. ‘All Night’, ‘Good Girls’ and 'Lay Low’.

== Development ==
The album was recorded around the world. The band began writing whilst traveling and touring through Costa Rica, South Africa, North America, England and Spain.

== Artwork ==
The album cover and all single artwork is the creation of U.S based artist, Isabel Bryna.

== Release ==
In June 2016, the band announced that they planned to release an album later in the year. On 17 August 2016, the band released the first single, ‘All Night’ from the then upcoming album which was premiered on Annie Mac’s BBC Radio 1 show. The band then toured throughout the summer of 2016 and on 29 September, they announced the official release date of the album ‘Everything Is My Family’ which was to be 21 October 2016. In conjunction with the album announce, the band also released a new track, ‘Way’s I Can’t Tell’ which was first heard by the public on radio presenter and DJ, Zane Lowe’s Beats 1 radio show. The second official single however was a song called, ‘Good Girls’ which went on to become radio presenter, Annie Mac’s ‘Hottest Record of the Week’. On 18 October, a third single was released. ‘Lay Low’ is the last track on the album and has been dedicated to the band's late drummer Andrea Marongiu.

== Track listing ==
No.	Title	Length
1.	"Simplecito"	1:22
2.	"Yellow Sun"	3:29
3.	"Good Girls"	3:00
4.	"In Your Arms"	3:33
5.	"Live For You"	3:36
6.	"Way's I Can't Tell"	3:50
7.	"All Night"	3:12
8.	"The Moondog"	5:57
9.	"Fly East"	6:42
10.	"Living The Dream"	4:21
11.	"Lay Low"	5:26

== Personnel ==
Credits for Crystal Fighters adapted from liner notes.

Written & Produced

- All tracks written by: Crystal Fighters (Sebastian Pringle, Gilbert Vierich, Graham W. Dickson)
- Additional writing by: Nicole Morier, Dan Nigro, Nate Company, Hugh Worskett, Jamie Scott and Jonny Coffer
- Produced by: Crystal Fighters, Luke Smith, Daniel Nigro, Jonny Coffer, Jamie Scott, Orlando Leopard, Charlie Hugall
- Additional production by: Charlie Hugall, Orlando Leopard, Tommy King, Luke Smith, Neil Comber, Jay Reynolds

Performed by

- Sebastian Pringle, Gilbert Vierich, Graham W. Dickson: vocals, backing vocals, acoustic guitars, classical guitars, electric guitars, ukuleles, charango, keyboards, bass guitar, txalaparta, txistu, kalimba, percussion, programming
- Ellie Fletcher, Nila Raja, Asante Duhur, Ella Chi, Leanne Ratcliffe, CK Gospel Choir, Jagaara : backing vocals
- Dan Bingham, Bo Morgan: drums, percussion
- Tommy King: keyboards
- Jonny bass: bass guitar

Mixing & Mastering

- Engineered by: Orlando Leopard, Luke Smith, Kristian Donaldson, Billy Halliday, Joseph Rogers, Jay Reynolds, Liam Howe, Brother Michael Rudinski, Will Ansbach, Neil Comber, Robbie Viano
- Mixed by: Wez Clarke, Michael Brauer, Matt Wiggins and Matty Green
- Mastered by: Stuart Hawkes at Metropolis
