= Spor (Slavic demon) =

Grain demon in Slavic mythology

Spor, sporysz [ˈspɔr,ˈspɔrɨʂ] is a grain demon in Slavic mythology. Its name means ''argument''. It is said that the demon was responsible for the exuberance of cereal collection or growth and tended to take the form of a small animal, a hamster or a mouse.
