= In the Summer =

"In The Summer"

Single by Crystal Fighters

from the album Star of Love
- Released: 5 July 2010
- Genre: Electronic
- Length: 3:56
- Label: Zirkulo
- Songwriter(s): Crystal Fighters
- Producer(s): Crystal Fighters

Crystal Fighters singles chronology
"I Love London" (2009)	"In The Summer" (2010)	"Follow / Swallow" (2010)

"In The Summer" is the third single by English electronic band Crystal Fighters from their album Star of Love. The single was released on 5 July 2010 through Zirkulo records to positive reviews.

== Release ==
This single was named by the BBCs Nick Grimshaw as one of his "Records of the Week". "In The Summer" received wide radio coverage, being played by Rob da Bank and Zane Lowe; being featured as a record to "Go buy Monday" by Dermot O'Leary; and even featuring as one of Huw Stephens' "Hottest records in the world".

== Music video ==
The video was directed by Tobias Stretch and filmed in the Appalachian Mountains.

== Track listing ==
No.	Title	Length
1.	"In The Summer"	03:56
2.	"In The Summer" (Tek-One Mix)	05:35
3.	"In The Summer" (dBridge's in the Shade Mix)	05:39
4.	"In The Summer" (Sepalcure Dub)	04:54
Total length:		20:04

== Reception ==
The single was well reviewed by music magazine The Fly who awarded the single 4 (out of 5) flies with the following review:

'In The Summer' sounds like Empire of the Sun taking on M.I.A. with uzi-like drum beats, optimism-laden lyrics ("Show me something wrong with the summer?") and an abundance of typically peculiar, thinking-outside-thebox explosions of electronica. Perfect.

— Harriet Gibsone,

== Charts ==
Chart (2010)	Peak position
Top 40 NME Singles	40
