= Apex (musician) =

British music producer & DJ (1981–2017)

- Also known as: Robert Oaks; Midnight Lamp; Unknown Error
- Born: Robert Dickeson; August 16, 1981; Dartford, Kent, England
- Died: September 30, 2017 (aged 36)
- Genres: Drum and bass; house
- Occupations: DJ; record producer; musician
- Instruments: Digital audio workstation; guitar
- Years active: 2005–2017
- Labels: Hospital; Lifted; Subtitles; Renegade Hardware; Horizons; Critical; mau5trap
- Formerly of: Unknown Error

Robert Dickeson (August 16, 1981 – September 30, 2017), known professionally as Apex and Robert Oaks, was an English drum and bass music producer and DJ.

== Early life ==
Dickeson was born on 16 August 1981 in Dartford, England, and raised in Maidstone, Kent, England. Dickeson was a multi-instrumentalist with the guitar as his primary instrument which he had played since the age of 12.

== Career ==
=== 2005–07: Unknown Error ===
Prior to his solo career, Dickeson was a producer and DJing member of drum and bass duo Unknown Error. Their 2005 first release, "Shadows", entered the BBC 1Xtra D&B charts at the 8th place, and was featured on the Hardware Chronicles (Volume 4) EP and the Guerrilla Warfare compilation.

This was followed by releases on the labels Renegade Hardware, Horizons, and the Moving Shadow EP Heaven and Hell which was selected as Mixmag's D&B release of the month.

=== 2007–16: Apex ===
After departing from Unknown Error he started up his solo alias Apex, with the first release, "Space Between" (featuring Ayah), released in April 2007 on Hospital Records, immediately hitting the BBC Radio 1 D&B Top Ten. It was included in the Andy C's mix CD D&B Arena Mix and Hospital Records' Weapons of Mass Creation 3.

In the same year Apex was part of establishing the label Lifted Music with Chris Renegade, Spor, Evol Intent, and Ewun. In the end of 2007 and the beginning of 2008 he toured around the world with a series of parties from the label Lifted Music Recordings. In February 2008, he released his solo EP Wall of Sound on Lifted Music which was extremely well received. In 2008 he won the Beatport D&B track of the year with his remix of Bachelors of Science's "Strings Track".

In June 2009 his remix of "Just One Second" from London Elektricity's Syncopated City album was released to great acclaim and was also featured on the Hospitality Drum & Bass 2010 compilation by Hospital Records. This track was very well received and even a few years after its release, in 2016, it was chosen by record breaking explorer Ben Saunders on the BBC radio show Desert Island Discs as one of his favourite tracks to listen to on his expeditions. This track was also used to promote and feature on the soundtrack of Gran Turismo 5.

=== 2016–17: Robert Oaks ===
In December 2016 and early 2017 he released four tracks through Mau5trap under his new alias Robert Oaks which focuses on techno and house. His track "On The Run" was played by Deadmau5 on his BBC Radio 1 residency show and also featured on the Mau5trap '16 compilation.

He released under the name Robert Oaks and also another experimental alias Midnight Lamp, through which he released a debut album, Coming Home, on 20 July 2017. His debut EP as Robert Oaks, My Shadow, was also released in July 2017. A posthumous release, The Beating Heart EP, was released on his Bandcamp account on 5 January 2018.

== Death ==
Dickeson died on 30 September 2017. The cause of his death is not certain, however sources close to Dickeson, have alleged that his death was the result of suicide.

== Discography ==
=== As Apex ===
Extended plays

- Wall of Sound (2008)
- Omega Point (2012)

Singles

- "Falling" / "Weeping Willow" (2008)
- "By the Way" / "The Yearning" (VIP) (2008)
- "Breathe" / "Emo Funk" (2008)
- "Entrapment" (2010)
- "Inner Space" / "Energy Lines" (2010)
- "Disconnected" (2011)
- "Echoes" (2018)

=== As Robert Oaks ===
Extended plays

- My Shadow (2017)
- The Beating Heart (2018)

=== As Midnight Lamp ===
Studio albums

- Coming Home (2017)
