= Kill the Noise =

American DJ and record producer

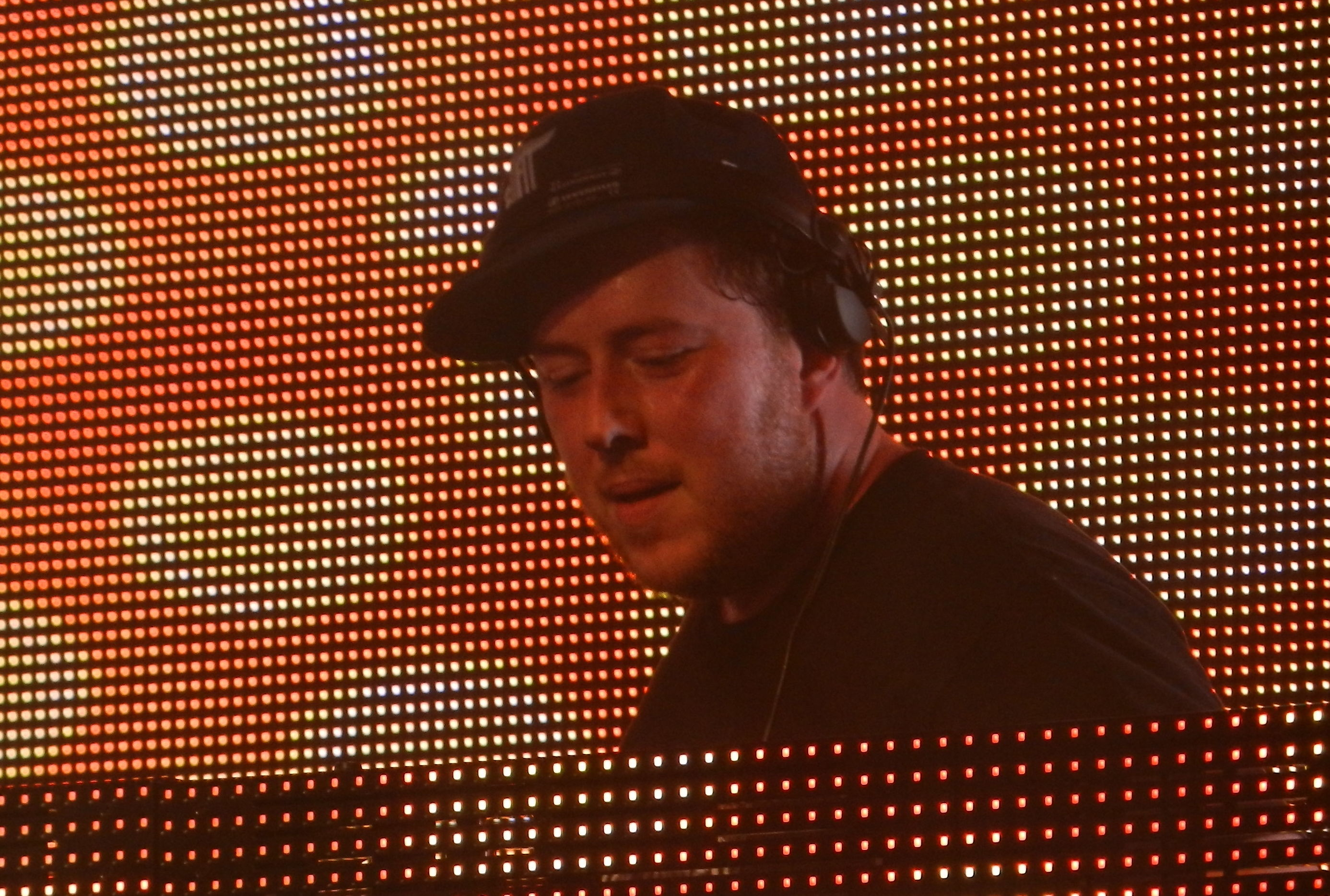
- Stanczak at the 2012 Spring Awakening Music Festival

Background information
- Also known as: Ewun; Kill the Zo; Snort & Leisure; Jacob Stanczak; Dead the Noise; Kill the Snails; Meowski 666
- Born: Jacob R. Stanczak; Rochester, New York, US
- Genres: Dubstep; electro house; brostep; drumstep
- Occupations: DJ; record producer
- Years active: 2003–present
- Labels: Owsla; Slow Roast; Monstercat; Atlantic; Proximity; Ophelia; SLUGZ Music; Storyteller Distribution Co; Mad Zoo
- Website: www.killthenoise.tv

Jacob R. Stanczak, known professionally as Kill the Noise, is an American DJ and record producer from Rochester, New York. His collaboration with Skrillex, Fatman Scoop and Michael Angelakos, "Recess", entered the UK Singles Chart at number 57. The song is the title track from Skrillex's debut album Recess. He has performed at Coachella, Electric Daisy Carnival (EDC), Lollapalooza, Ultra Music Festival, Creamfields, Spring Awakening Music Festival, Holy Ship, Electric Zoo, Electric Forest, Bonnaroo and Tomorrowland.

== Career ==
In 2006, Stanczak recorded a DJ mix for the Barcode Recordings compilation album Shades of Black that was featured on its CD release.

=== 2011 ===
In 2011, Kill the Noise produced and was featured on "Narcissistic Cannibal", and "Fuels the Comedy" from Korn's tenth studio album, The Path of Totality. "Narcissistic Cannibal" was released as a single on October 18, 2011, with the album following on December 6, 2011. On February 3, 2012, Stanczak took the stage with Korn to perform on Jimmy Kimmel Live!.

=== 2012 ===
Kill the Noise was chosen as MTV Clubland's “Video Pick of the Year” for his song “Kill the Noise (Part I)” which was released off his 2011 EP Kill Kill Kill which was released through OWSLA.

=== 2013 ===
In 2013, Kill the Noise was chosen a second time for MTV Clubland's “Pick of the Year” for his song “Black Magic (Kill the Noise Pt II)” which was released off his 2012 BLVCK MVGIC EP. That same year he embarked on his headlining North American tour called “The Black Magic Mystical Wonder Tour”.

=== 2014 ===
Kill the Noise began working on multiple major film soundtracks, including the Teenage Mutant Ninja Turtles, with the platinum-certified track “Shell Shocked” with Juicy J, Wiz Khalifa, Ty Dolla $ign and composer Brian Tyler. In October 2014, Kill the Noise and Feed Me released their single “Far Away” which was accompanied by a music video animated by Augenblick Studios which is known for their work on the Adult Swim show Super Jail.

In 2014, Kill the Noise teamed up with Anjunabeats artist Mat Zo to release the track Kill the Zo, Pt. It was accompanied with a tour of the same name.

=== 2015 ===
In 2015 Kill the Noise released his first full-length album OCCULT CLASSIC through OWSLA. The album featured AWOLNATION, Dillon Francis, Tommy Trash and Madsonik. The release of this album was followed with his headlining tour called “Occult Classic Tour” which traveled throughout North America.

=== 2016 ===
In April 2016 Kill the Noise released the music video for his single “I Do Coke” with Feed Me off of his album OCCULT CLASSIC. OCCULT CLASSIC was later followed up by a 17-track remix album titled ALT CLASSIC released on 13 May 2016 with notable artists REZZ, NGHTMRE, Snails, Gammer and Slander. The video starred Tom Sandoval from the Bravo reality show Vanderpump Rules. In 2016, he produced a remake of the classic “Relax” by Frankie Goes to Hollywood with A$AP Rocky, Nitty Scott, and Sam Sparro for Zoolander 2. Kill The Noise notably performed at Fuji Rock Festival on July 23, 2016.

=== 2017 ===
In 2017, Kill the Noise wrote “Divebomb" featuring Tom Morello for the film XXX: Return of Xander Cage. In the fall, Kill the Noise joined Seven Lions and Tritonal on the Horizon Tour which traveled across North America between October through December. Kill The Noise also teamed with Seven Lions to release the single “Cold Hearted” on Monstercat Records.

=== 2018 ===
In 2018, Kill The Noise teamed with Tritonal and Seven Lions to release the collaborative song “Horizon”, which was written on their 2017 North America tour. Kill The Noise also notably performed as the bassrush stage headliner at Electric Daisy Carnival with 12th Planet on May 20, 2018.

=== 2019 ===
In 2019, Kill the Noise wrote and produced the song “Redemption” featuring Al Jourgensen for the Netflix film In the Shadow of the Moon.

== Discography ==
Studio albums

- Occult Classic (2015)
- EMBRACƎ (2022)
- Hollow World (2023)

== Awards and nominations ==
2016: Berlin Music Video Awards, nominated in the Most Trashy category for 'kill it 4 the kids'
