= Crystal Fighters =

British band

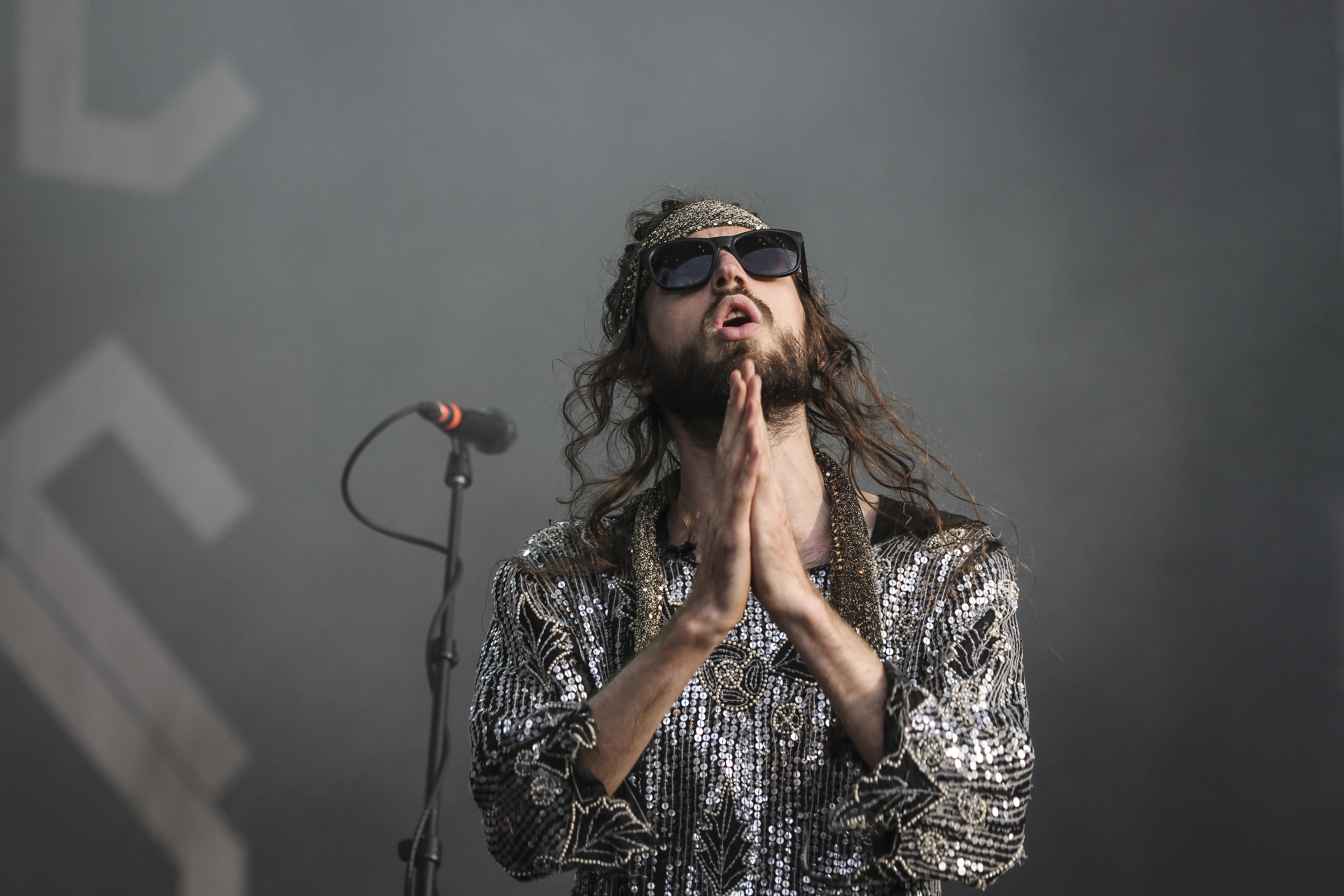
- Sebastian Pringle at Dockville Festival 2013

Background information
- Origin: London, England
- Genres: Alternative dance; synth-pop; folk; folktronica; indie pop; indie rock
- Years active: 2007–present
- Labels: Zirkulo; PIAS; Atlantic
- Members: Sebastian Pringle; Gilbert Vierich; Graham Dickson
- Past members: Mimi Borrelli; Laure Stockley; Andrea Marongiu (deceased); Nila Raja
- Website: www.crystalfighters.com

Crystal Fighters are an English-American electronic music band formed in London in 2007. Their debut album, Star of Love, was released in October 2010 in the UK and was released in the US through Atlantic Records in April 2012. Their second album, Cave Rave, was released in May 2013 and their third, Everything Is My Family was released in October 2016. Their fourth album titled Gaia & Friends was released in March 2019. Their most recent album, LIGHT+, was released in November 2023.

== Career ==
=== Formation and early years ===
Crystal Fighters consists of Sebastian Pringle (lead vocals, guitar), Gilbert Vierich (electronics, guitars, txalaparta, percussion), Graham Dickson (guitar/txalaparta), Laure Stockley (vocals) and Mimi Borrelli (vocals).

Pringle, Vierich, and Dickson began making music under various guises before being joined by Laure Stockley and Mimi Borelli. The band added Andrea Marongiu as their drummer in September 2010.

The group took their name Crystal Fighters from an unfinished opera which Stockley's grandfather had penned during his final months of insanity. Stockley came across the manuscript while clearing out the reclusive old man's remote home in the Basque countryside. She became obsessed by the intriguing scrawls within it and shared it with the others. Captivated by its seemingly prophetic contents, the band took on the name and formed in an attempt to expand upon the wild and deranged spirit of Stockley's grandfather's writings. "We started writing music around the book and learning about Basque culture and how the music and history has evolved. From there we decided we wanted to finish the opera and do a live show that would get across some of the amazing, crazy... stuff that was in this book. So we crafted this live show around the book and wrote new music based on its directions and looking at Basque music as a whole." explains Vierich.

=== Instruments and style ===
Describing their style as "fast, mesmeric and passionate", the band play both electric and acoustic guitars, which adds much timbre, synths, drums, and incorporate traditional Basque instruments into their music. Many of their songs use a txalaparta, a wooden xylophone-like percussion instrument played by two people standing face-to-face. They also use the danbolin (a rope-tuned snare drum), and the txistu (a Basque pipe whistle).

Crystal Fighters' style is a fusion of genres – fast progressive dance music joined by the melodies and dances of traditional Basque folk, alongside synthesisers, bass-driven wonk-funk, with beats fuelled by early 1980s Spanish punk and experimental electronica from bands such as Aviador Dro, Las Vulpes and Dulce Venganza. Basque music informs much of their songwriting: the riff on "Champion Sound" is lifted from the Basque folk piece "Sagar Dantza" and "In The Summer" draws upon music heard at the Carnival of Lantz in Navarra. Paul Lester of The Guardian has described their style as "what would happen if you went back 100 years, dropped a load of recording equipment into a remote Basque village and left the villagers, steeped in folk music, to their own devices."

A melting pot of cultural, musical and stylistic influences, Crystal Fighters use eclectic reference points to create their unique genre of music, stating "we consider ourselves to be a mixture of folk, electro, punk, techno, dubstep and Spanish pop. We are kind of like the sound that would be created if The Velvet Underground and The Gipsy Kings were to travel back in time to the Pyrenees, 1980, and make a record with Skream, Madlib and Luciano on production."

Their unique style has caused NME to comment that "Crystal Fighters have stood out as one of the most interesting prospects by a mile – something genuinely new sounding." while Virgin Music describe the band's output as suitable for "the trans-continental, scene-crossing, cultural explorer".

On their second album Cave Rave, Crystal Fighters expanded the sound palette further, bringing in additional traditional instruments such as the charango and incorporating elements from Hispanic and African dance as well as Mexican electronic music. The Line of Best Fit stated that "they sought the wisdom of African musical icons and explored the sounds that cultures of the world have on offer, soaking in the variety, cherrypicking their favourite parts. There’s a notable Latin feel to the record ('No Man'), there's even some tribal percussion ('LA Calling')."

Consequence of Sound equally praised their new sound and commented that "the band succeeds wildly in fusing traditional Spanish music with ultra-accessible dance beats."

=== Kitsuné years ===
In 2008, music website Palms Out Sounds picked up the track "I Love London" and news of the band's unique sound began to spread. This was followed by two single releases through record label Kitsuné in 2009. "[We] sent "Xtatic Truth" [to Kitsuné] and immediately they came back to us and said they loved it and wanted to put it out and put it on the compilation. Then we suggested they listened to a couple of other songs like "I Love London" and they thought that was great too." "I Love London" went on to be Mixmag's number 91 song of 2008.

In 2009, the band recorded and made a video for "Robot Restroom" with Tom Neville and Henry Benett although it was never released.

The group were chosen as Diesel U Music's Spanish representatives, and launched MySpace Music in the UK, and went on to be listed as number 8 in New Band Day's 'Best New Bands 2010' Awards.

=== 2010–2012: Star of Love and "Love Is All I Got" ===
Star of Love is the first album by Crystal Fighters. It was released to critical acclaim in the UK on 4 October 2010 via the band's own label Zirkulo. In Europe, the album is licensed to PIAS. In Australia, the album was released via Liberator Music, and the band signed with Atlantic Records in the US who released Star of Love in April 2012.

The BBC called it an "assured, sporadically thrilling first shot" while Artrocker said "this lot really are a rare talent that you'd be foolish to ignore." Mojo gave the album 4 out of 5, stating "there's a thrilling carnival atmosphere to Star of Love (...) unique and highly moreish". The Fly called it "a record as high in energy and delightfully messy as their now notorious live performances" while BBC's Zane Lowe said "classed as dance music but altogether more interesting than anything anyone in that field has done in years".

Of the recording process, Pringle stated: "we decided to spend a fair bit of time making sure it was all in place, that we were happy with how everything sounded, primarily making sure the songs somehow linked in with one another even though there's a slew of mad genres going on within the record. We spent a fair bit of time in the studio, having written most of it at home in our warehouse, the three of us together, before taking it to the studio to mix it properly." Written and produced by Crystal Fighters, Star of Love presents the unique focus and the combined talents of the band. "It's absolutely collaborative... we all have our strengths within the band but because it’s all written pretty much in one room in Hackney, it all gets vetted by each other... there's a lot of toing and froing of opinions and a collaborative relationship going on at all points of the process."

The collection of songs explore the themes in singer Stockley's grandfather's writings. Themes include the unfathomable mystery of the universe, the turbulent journey towards being at peace with death, the triumph of love, and the omnipotence of the sun. Each song tells a story, both sonically and aurally, and each story has its cryptic connections with the dark and tormented world of the original opera. "[Laure's grandfather's] themes are grand, therefore in our songs we try to stick to them. Plus in the same way he is addressing things in this kind of crazed emotional and passionate way, and portraying the larger themes of life, we are continuing to follow on from that."

They were featured on a small documentary 4Play: Crystal Fighters, which aired 25 February 2011 on Channel 4.

They appeared on Channel 4's Abbey Road Debuts, a new music programme from the producers of Live from Abbey Road which began in April 2011.

Singles released from the album include "I Love London", "Xtatic Truth" and "In The Summer", with the single "Plage" being used to soundtrack various commercials and going on to obtain gold sales status in the Netherlands. Their single "At home" was added to BBC's Radio 1's playlist.

For the album's US release on Atlantic Records, the band included new songs "Fiesta" and "Earth Island".

Crystal Fighters released Star of Love Remixes album, worldwide, in September 2012.

Crystal Fighters released "Love Is All I Got", a collaborative single with Feed Me released by Mau5trap and subsequently licensed onto Sony Records in October 2012. "Love Is All I Got" was premiered as Zane Lowe's Hottest Record of the week on BBC Radio 1 in September 2012, as well as being Fearne Cotton's record of the week on BBC Radio 1 from 22 October 2012.

Frontman Sebastian Pringle was interviewed by Gigwise in November 2012. Bast comments on the "Love Is All I Got" release and the support received from BBC Radio 1, "We basically just had a couple of songs left over from the first album that we needed to finish off. That is very much a stand-alone collaboration. When we do it live it will kind of be our own version of it."

=== 2013–2014: Cave Rave ===
Crystal Fighters' second album is called Cave Rave; the name of the album comes from the ancient European times when people were documenting creative experiences in caves. The album was recorded in Los Angeles and was set for release on 27 May 2013. The band call the Basque hills their "spiritual home and a great influence for the new album"; Basque mythology sparked interest in the band to pick up more exotic instruments from Africa and South America and use them all over the record. The band released a preview clip of "Wave" on 6 February 2013. On 18 February, they announced the release of Cave Rave, a larger tour in Europe and a tour across North America, and posted a full song called "Separator" on YouTube. The album artwork is by artist Paul Laffoley, and was premiered on Jay-Z's Life + Times website on 18 February 2013.

"You & I" is the first main single on the album. The song was debuted on BBC Radio 1's Zane Lowe show as the "Hottest Record in the World". Subsequently, it was added to BBC Radio 1's playlist and 3FM in the Netherlands' playlist as Megahit. The video was directed by Elliot Sellers and was premiered on Vice Noisey. Crystal Fighters performed their single "You & I" and a cover of Rudimental's "Waiting All Night" on BBC Radio 1 Live Lounge in June 2013. The Sunless 97 remix was premiered on The Fader, and the Gigamesh remix was premiered on Vibe. The album "Cave Rave" was included on XFM's 50 Best Albums of 2013 list.

"LA Calling" and "Love Natural" followed as singles, with "Love Natural" being featured on the FIFA 14 soundtrack. "LA Calling" was added to BBC Radio 1's playlist.

The album was produced by Justin Meldal-Johnson, and mixed by Manny Marroquin in LA. When asked about their sound, the band replied it is "a meeting of old and new, human and robotic".

=== 2014–2015: "Love Alight" and Marongiu's death ===
Originally written and recorded as part of the Cave Rave album session, "Love Alight" was released as a standalone single on 4 August 2014. The song was premiered by Zane Lowe on Tuesday 17 June and had 4 BBC Radio 1 plays in the first 24 hours after its premiere. The official music video was directed by Rob Heppell.

Guitarist and txalaparta player Graham Dickson founded Axis Mundi Records. An independent record label based in Brooklyn, New York features artists such as Is Tropical and Psymon Spine.

On 11 September 2014, Andrea Marongiu, the band's drummer, died from heart failure.

=== 2015–2016: Everything Is My Family ===
In September 2016, Crystal Fighters released their first new single in two years, "All Night" which has reached BBC Radio 1's, B playlist. They announced that their upcoming third album, Everything Is My Family, will be out on 21 October 2016. On 13 October 2016, the band released the second single from the LP, "Good Girls" and the third single, "Lay Low" the week of the album's release. This single was dedicated to the band's deceased drummer Andrea Marongiu.

On 21 October 2016, Crystal Fighters released their third studio album, Everything Is My Family. The album was released via their own label, Zirkulo under license to Play It Again Sam.

=== 2018: "Boomin' In Ya Jeep" and Hypnotic Sun ===
The single "Boomin' In Ya Jeep" was released in May 2018 through Warner Bros. Records, with a video directed by Tyler Lee. An EP, Hypnotic Sun, was released in November 2018 featuring "Another Level", "Going Harder" (feat. Bomba Estereo) and "All My Love". "Another Level" was featured in the game soundtrack for Electronic Arts football game FIFA 19.

=== 2019: Gaia & Friends ===
In February 2019, Crystal Fighters released a single titled "Wild Ones" and announced that a new album, titled Gaia & Friends, will be released on 1 March. The album includes feature appearances from artists like Bomba Estéreo, Petite Noir, or Soledad Veléz.

In 2021, Crystal Fighters released three NFTs. The NFTs were reinterpretations of the original artwork for the tracks "Lay Low", "In Your Arms" and "Simplicity" from the album Everything Is My Family, the NFTs included audio written by Crystal Fighters.

== Live performances ==
Initially the band's performances took the format of a musical opera to convey the story of each song and bring about evocative reactions from their audiences through the vehicle of performance art, "It was chaotic and we've been trying to bring that sort of energy to every show since." The band now describe the show as, "Maybe not an opera in scale, but visually at least, and with the aid of a live drummer and vocalist, the drama can only increase...making the songs as powerful as possible will become our main influence." Their dramatic and artful performances have become somewhat legendary with Mixmag proclaiming them to have "the single most exciting show in dance music" while Dazed & Confused stated that "there is nothing more alive or energetic than Crystal Fighters". CMJ adds: "Fans of Crystal Fighters can attest to two undeniable truths about them: One, that the band's sound cannot be compartmentalized in any modern day label, and two, that very few shows can ever live up to the energy and drive that fuels a Crystal Fighters show".

Their knack for fusing genres has garnered them a reputation for thrilling and involving live shows, of which Pringle explains: "With dance music you can go and see a DJ who is in a booth, so you dance all night and just watch him there kind of doing nothing, which obviously can be amazing. But if you have a live performance where you are playing the same kind of music, the whole experience then changes into a rock show and so much more besides, so we're trying to make people experience dance music in a new way." This reputation has led to the band being awarded the accolade of "a definite band to watch during the summer festival season" by numerous publications, including The Guardian, Artrocker and Skiddle.

=== 2008–2010 ===
Crystal Fighters played over 100 shows across 15 countries between 2008 and 2010, including top UK festivals such as Glastonbury, Bestival, V Festival, Leeds Festival, Creamfields, Lovebox, Secret Garden Party and Isle of Wight Festival. Worldwide, they performed at Sziget Festival (Hungary), SXSW, StereoSonic (Australia), Eurosonic, C/O Pop (Germany), Creamfelds Spain, Lowlands (the Netherlands), Hurricane Festival & Southside Festival (Germany), Suprette (Switzerland), Emmaboda (Sweden), Parklife (Australia), Electric Picnic (Ireland), Frequency (Austria) and Bergenfest (Australia). Crystal Fighters also supported Foals on their UK tour in November 2010 as well as headlining their own UK tour in October of the same year.

=== 2011–2012 ===
In October 2011, the band embarked upon a sold out UK headline tour, before heading to Europe in November. Crystal Fighters played numerous shows at Austin's SXSW festival in March 2012 before setting off on a US tour, taking in cities such as Miami, San Francisco, Los Angeles and a sold-out show at New York's Glasslands. They ultimately returned to North America in May 2012, performing alongside Is Tropical.

The group also recorded a Daytrotter session engineered by Shawn Biggs at Studio Paradiso, San Francisco, California in November 2012.

=== 2013 ===
The band announced a set of tour dates planned for May 2013, covering shows in the UK, Europe and North America including a homecoming show at London's Brixton Academy in November 2013. They performed a string of 6 European shows in May 2013, all of them being sold out in advance, then toured North America in June with Portugal. The Man.

Gigwise claimed they are "the best festival band on the entire planet" after seeing their performance at Optimus Alive festival in Lisbon, Portugal in July 2013.

On Tuesday 14 May 2013 The Guardian announced Crystal Fighters plans to hold a "cave rave" in the heart of the Basque countryside on 29 August 2013. The Cave Rave event took place on 29 August at Zugarramurdi cave outside San Sebastian. Support came from Belako and Wilhelm & The Dancing Animals. Newspaper El País described the Cave Rave as a "comprehensive review of their two albums", delivering "cathartic moments of communion with the faithful from San Sebastian."

Crystal Fighters closed their 2013 worldwide tour with another set of North American and European shows, including a sold-out concert at the Brixton Academy on 22 November.

=== 2014 ===
Crystal Fighters started 2014 with a 7 date Australian tour, with performances including Falls Festival, Field Day Festival and Southbound Festival. The band returned to Spain in May 2014, playing 8 shows supported by Is Tropical, and embarked upon a worldwide tour covering North America, Europe and South Africa.

The North America tour kicked off on 23 May 2014 with Sasquatch Festival, followed by 4 US shows in El Paso, San Diego, San Francisco and Los Angeles. The band closed their North American tour with two Mexican shows in Guadalajara and Mexico City.

On 27 June 2014, Crystal Fighters performed once again at Glastonbury, this time on the John Peel stage. The full concert was recorded and broadcast via the BBC iPlayer. On 18 July, the band performed a set at Latitude Festival on the Obelisk Arena stage.

Crystal Fighters finished 2014 by playing Atlantico Festival in Rome, Italy on 29 October.

=== 2015 ===
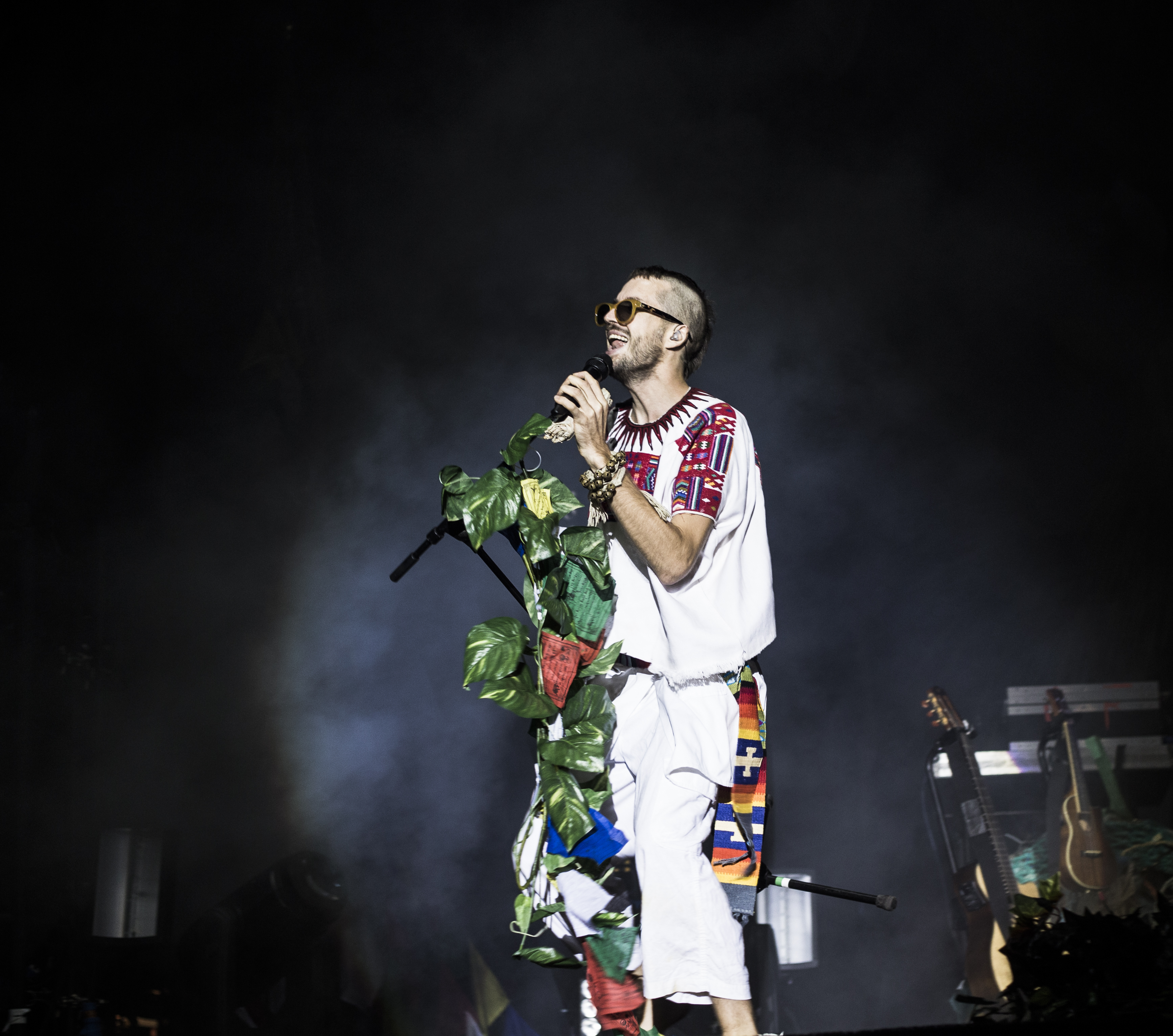
Crystal Fighters during Festival Internacional de Benicàssim in 2015

During the Summer of 2015, Crystal Fighters played a number of festivals throughout Europe including sets at Festival Internacional de Benicàssiml, Lollapalooza, Gurtenfestival, Super Bock Super Rock, Stuttgart Festival and Santander Music Festival well as performing headlining slots at Somersault Festival and Dcode Festival.

=== 2016 ===
In January it was announced that Crystal Fighters will be headlining Arenal Sound Festival in Burriana (Castellón), Spain. They also confirmed on 2 March that they would be embarking on a tour across North America from April through to march, playing a number of live shows and festivals, including Coachella.

The band embarked on a world tour from July until November 2016.

=== 2017 ===
In 2017, the band toured in the United States and headlined several festivals across Europe and North America including Pinkpop, Rock am Ring, Lollapalooza, and Rock Werchter.

=== 2018 ===
In 2018, Crystal Fighters continued to play festivals, especially in Spain and Portugal. They also played a show at MTV's World Stage event in Bilbao.

=== 2019 ===
In 2019, Crystal Fighters announced a European tour in support of their new album Gaia & Friends. After playing in Spain, Portugal, Germany, Switzerland, Belgium, Netherlands and France, the tour would conclude with a headline show at O2 Brixton Academy in London.

On 21 June, they headlined the May Ball at Corpus Christi College, Cambridge.

On 25 July 2019, six years on from Cave Rave, Crystal Fighters hosted Wave Rave, a one-day festival, in the Biscayan town of Bermeo. The event was co-hosted by Bay of Biscay festival. The band used the festival in order to promote awareness of sustainability, the environment, and clean water. As such, Crystal Fighters collaborated with Wateraid and Raw Bottles to create a limited series of reusable, stainless-steel water bottles and organic short-sleeved T-shirts, with a percentage of the proceeds donated to Wateraid. On 26 July, the day after the festival, the band participated in the cleaning of the beach alongside attendees of the festival in order to raise awareness about plastic pollution and the importance of clean oceans.

== Discography ==
=== Studio albums ===
- Star of Love (2010)
- Cave Rave (2013)
- Everything Is My Family (2016)
- Gaia & Friends (2019)
- LIGHT+ (2023)
