= Amon Tobin discography =

This is the discography (albums, EPs, singles, and remixes) released by Amon Tobin under his own name, under the names Cujo, Two Fingers and Only Child Tyrant, and in collaboration with other artists.

== Albums ==
=== Studio albums ===
As Cujo

- Adventures in Foam (1996)
- Paranova (2026)

As Amon Tobin

- Bricolage (1997)
- Permutation (1998)
- Supermodified (2000)
- Out from Out Where (2002)^{[a]}
- Chaos Theory – The Soundtrack to Tom Clancy's Splinter Cell: Chaos Theory (2005)
- Foley Room (2007)^{[b]}
- ISAM (2011)
- Fear in a Handful of Dust (2019)
- Long Stories (2019)
- How Do You Live (2021)

As Two Fingers

- Two Fingers (2009)^{[c]}
- Stunt Rhythms (2012)
- Fight! Fight! Fight! (2020)
- Cronos (with Muadeep, 2023)

As Only Child Tyrant

- Time to Run (2019)

As Figueroa

- The World as We Know It (2020)

As Stone Giants

- West Coast Love Stories (2021)

Notes:

- ^{^[a]} Chart positions: Heatseekers: 43, Top Independent Albums: 32
- ^{^[b]} Chart positions: Top Electronic Albums: 13
- ^{^[c]} Collaboration between Amon Tobin and Doubleclick featuring MC Sway

=== Live albums ===
As Amon Tobin

- Solid Steel Presents Amon Tobin: Recorded Live (2004)
- Foley Room Recorded Live In Brussels (2008)
- Electronic Music for the Sydney Opera House (2017)

== Singles & EPs ==
As Cujo

- Curfew (1995)
- The Remixes (1996)
- Nine Bars Back (2019)

As Amon Tobin

- Creatures (1996)
- Chomp Samba (1997)
- Mission (1997)
- Piranha Breaks (1997)
- Like Regular Chickens (Danny Breaks & Dillinja Remixes) (1998)
- 4 Ton Mantis (2000)
- Slowly (2000)
- East To West (2002)
- Verbal (2002)^{[a]}
- The Lighthouse (2005)
- Bloodstone (EP, 2007)
- Taxidermia (EP, 2008)
- "Surge" (2011)
- Dark Jovian (EP, 2015)
- "On a Hilltop Sat the Moon" (2019)
- "Vipers Follow You" (2019)
- "Fooling Alright" (2019)
- "One Shy Morning" (2019)
- "Full Panther" (2019)
- Hole in the Ground (Original Motion Picture Soundtrack) (EP, 2023)
- "A Living Room (Music from Meow Wolf's Omega Mart)" (2022)

As player

- Angel Of Theft (2004)
As Two Fingers
- "What You Know" (featuring Sway) (2009)
- "That Girl" (featuring Sway) (2009)
- "Bad Girl" (2009)
- "Sweden / Razorback" (2012)
- "Vengence Rhythm" (2012)
- Six Rhythms (EP, 2015)
- "296 Rhythm" (2019)
- "You Ain't Down" (2019)
- "LED Moon Rhythm" (2019)
- "Orange" (with Ivy Lab) (2019)
- "Fight! Fight! Fight!" (2020)
- "Dzjengis" (with Noisia and Amon Tobin, 2020)
- "Banished" (with Muadeep and Amon Tobin, 2022)
- "Lost Gods" (with Muadeep and Amon Tobin, 2022)

As Only Child Tyrant

- "Monkey Box" (2019)
- "Slip One" (with Two Fingers and Amon Tobin, 2020)
- End of Summer (2020)
- "The Love Again" (2021)
- "Make Better Friends" (with Amon Tobin, 2022)
- "HoneyCup Troll" (with Amon Tobin, 2022)

As Figueroa

- "End of Summer" (with Amon Tobin, 2020)
- "Lost and Stray" (with Amon Tobin, 2022)

As Stone Giants

- Metropole Remixes, Vol. 1 (2024)
- Metropole Remixes, Vol. 2 (2024)

Notes:

- ^{^[a]} Chart positions: Canadian Singles Chart: 15

=== The Nomark Club exclusives ===
Subsequent releases distributed by Tobin exclusively through his own online subscription service Nomark Club, based on Bandcamp.

As Amon Tobin

- 4 Deck Set (Recorded Live on 4 Decks in Seattle and released in 2009)
- Fine Strips of Violence (EP, 2019)
- "Small Time Shaded" (with Patrick Watson, 2020)
- Neutrino Mass (EP, 2020)
- "Future Things Swim Before Me" (2020)
- All for Dust (CS:GO Music Pack) (sample pack, 2020)
- "Three Sisters" (2020)
- Magic Beard (EP, 2021)
- "Highland Park (The Secret Hidden Life of Button Down Fashion Bow)" (2021)
- "Fly by Nightly" (2021)
- "First Cat Last Cat" (2021)
- "Pajamaland" (2022)
- "Paisley Knights" (2022)
- "Mr. Missou's Holiday" (2022)
- "Slow Sun" (2022)
- "You and Me Me and You" (2022)
- "In Small Windows" (2022)
- "Paranova" (Amon Tobin vs. Cujo, 2022)
- "Pulsar23 (Live Play Recording)" (2022)
- "Dear June" (2022)
- "Paper Stone" (2023)
- "Deep Freda" (2023)
- "Modulus" (2023)
- "Hush Say the Wilds" (2023)
- "Eliot" (2023)
- "Strange Inside" (2023)
- "NEVA" (2023)
- "MARF" (2023)
- "From a Park Bench" (2023)
- "DEE 0" (2023)
- "Dog of My Enemy" (2024)
- "Body Solver" (2024)
- "Folts Volk" (2024)
- "Sometimes the Sun" (2024)
- "These Lines" (2024)

As Cujo

- "Nine Bars Back" (2019)
- "Babou the Dog" (Cujo vs. Two Fingers, 2021)

As Two Fingers

- Full Lockdown (DJ Mix, 2020)
- "Golden" (2020)
- "Yumyum Rhythm" (2021)

As Stone Giants

- "A Well Run Road (Alternate Version)" (2023)
- "Goodbye Sweetheart" (2024)

Additional content

- Phacetime S03E02 (Phace interviews Amon Tobin, 2022)

== Collections, collaborations, and other appearances ==
As Amon Tobin

- Verbal Remixes & Collaborations (2003)
- Kitchen Sink Remixes (2007)
- "Don't Even Trip" by Peeping Tom (2006)^{[a]}
- "Fine Objects" by Eskamon (Amon Tobin & Eskmo, 2010)
- inFAMOUS: Original Soundtrack from the Video Game (2009)^{[b]}
- Splinter Cell: Conviction (2010)^{[c]}
- Monthly Joints Series (2010)
- Chaos Theory Remixed (The Soundtrack to Splinter Cell 3D) (2011)
- Boxset (2012)
- "Vigilantes (Amon Tobin Remix)" by Noisia (2017)^{[d]}
- "Small Time Shaded" (2020)^{[e]}
- Ghostcards (Collaboration with Thys, 2020)
- "The All Attracting" by Amon Tobin & Current Value (2021)^{[f]}
- Nomark Selects, Vol. 1 (2023)

As Two Fingers

- Instrumentals (2009)
- "Puma Rhythm" (Collaboration of Thys, Two Fingers, and Amon Tobin, 2022)
- "Hodo: Redo" (Collaboration with Thys and Two Fingers, 2023)

Notes:

- ^{^[a]} From Peeping Tom by Peeping Tom, a project of Mike Patton
- ^{^[b]} Collaboration with Jim Dooley, Mel Wesson, JD Mayer, Martin Tillman, and Working for a Nuclear Free City
- ^{^[c]} Additional music produced for the video game, in collaboration with Michael Nielson & Kaveh Cohen
- ^{^[d]} Contribution to the remix album Outer Edges (Remixes)
- ^{^[e]} Collaboration with Patrick Watson
- ^{^[f]} Contribution to the album The All Attracting by Current Value

== Music videos ==
As Amon Tobin

- "4 Ton Mantis", directed by Floria Sigismondi (2000)
- "Slowly" (2000)
- "Verbal", directed by Alex Rutterford (2002)
- "Proper Hoodidge", directed by Corine Stübi (2002)
- "El Cargo", by Hexstatic (2005)
- "Esther's", directed by Charles De Meyer (2010)
- "Fooling Alright", by Christian Moeller (2019)
- "Vipers Follow You", directed by Charles De Meyer (2019)
