= Boxset (Amon Tobin album) =

- Picture of the set, as it was released: two fibreboard sheets with vinyl sleeves and CD/DVD housing, bolt together with wing nuts.

Compilation album / Remix album by Amon Tobin
- Released: 25 May 2012
- Genre: IDM, trip hop, breakbeat, experimental
- Length: CDs: Vinyls: DVDs: Extras:
- Label: Ninja Tune Records (ZEN180X)
- Producer: Amon Tobin

Amon Tobin chronology
ISAM (2011)	Boxset (2012)	Dark Jovian (2015)

The Boxset (also referred to as Amon Tobin) is the 6-LP, 7-CD, 2-DVD compilation boxset by the Brazilian electronic musician Amon Tobin, released on 25 May 2012, on Ninja Tune. The Boxset includes Tobin's new music, along with his unreleased dubplates, earliest audio experiments, film and television scores, deleted bootlegs, remixes, cover versions and re-interpretations of Tobin's previous 2011 album ISAM, the ISAM live audio album and DVD, Tobin's remixes for other artists – as well as the recording of the November 2010 orchestrations of Tobin's music by Ilan Eshkeri performed by The London Metropolitan Orchestra.

== Background ==
The Boxset was released as a 4000-copies limited-edition, in the form of bolt-fastened mechanical press, made of a ½-inch medium-density fibreboard, designed by the design studio Oscar & Ewan, and produced by the packaging production studio Think Tank. The release contains 6 10" vinyls, 7 CDs, 2 DVDs, and posters. 10" sleeves, CD/DVD housing, and poster all have holes in the each corner which allow them to be passed on to the bolts.

Most of the included material has not been released earlier on a physical format. Additionally, the set contains a registration information for further downloadable material "we couldn't fit in the box": ambient tracks, all material from the vinyl EPs, the score for the 2006 comedy-drama horror film Taxidermia, as well as the collection of ISAM remixes by Frank Riggio.

Parallel to the release of the Boxset, in May 2012, Tobin performed tracks from ISAM and classic material in the audiovisual ISAM: Live show at the O2 Brixton Academy in London, and at the FutureEverything Festival in Manchester, after sold-out shows at the Roundhouse and London Forum, which featured visual backdrops by V Squared Labs.

== Critical reception ==
Professional ratings
Review scores
Source	Rating
Wired	link

Wired magazine panned the compilation "a bolt-fastened art object for Amon Tobin completists".

== Track listing ==
Details of the release based on credits on Tobin's official website.

CD 1: ISAM Live
No.	Title	Original version on:	Length
1.	"Intro Sequence"	—	2:00
2.	"Journeyman (Extended Live Version)"	ISAM	5:25
3.	"Piece of Paper"	ISAM	2:46
4.	"Bed Time Stories (Extended Live Version)"	ISAM	4:31
5.	"Wooden Toy (Extended Live Version)"	ISAM	4:06
6.	"Lost and Found"	ISAM	3:33
7.	"Slowly (2011 Live Rebuild Version)"	Supermodified	3:00
8.	"Machine Gun Remix (Noisia, Amon Tobin remix)"	Split the Atom	3:43
9.	"Goto10"	ISAM	4:24
10.	"Surge (Two Fingers Remix)"	ISAM	4:59
11.	"Kitty Cat (Live Version)"	ISAM	6:26
12.	"Dropped from the Sky (Live Version)"	ISAM	7:05
13.	"Night Swim"	ISAM	4:07
14.	"Horsefish (Live Version)"	Foley Room	4:14
Total length:			60:19

CD 2: Monthly Joints
No.	Title	Length
1.	"Hey Mr. Tree"	3:56
2.	"Twelvses"	2:42
3.	"At Work"	3:37
4.	"Dualistic"	3:51
5.	"Eight Sum"	4:12
6.	"It's a Lovely Night"	3:41
7.	"Shut Down"	3:10
8.	"Technique"	3:36
9.	"Trickstep"	3:32
10.	"Delpher"	6:29
11.	"Into the Dark (Intermission)"	24:01
12.	"Amon Tobin on Q (CBC interview, courtesy of CBC's Q)"	15:45
Total length:		78:32

Tracks 1 to 10 were released on Tobin's website monthly between 2007 and 2010.

CD 3: Selected Scores
No.	Title	Length
1.	"Breathless"	1:42
2.	"The Gift"	4:46
3.	"Hard Run (Chase Scene Test)"	1:04
4.	"The Gift (Alternate Score)"	4:06
5.	"Theme for End"	0:34
6.	"The Big Marching Threat"	1:19
7.	"The Bleak Outlook"	0:50
8.	"Theme for Eagle Road Sequence"	1:15
9.	"First Sons Explore"	4:58
10.	"War and Peace But Mainly War"	2:41
11.	"Nightcrawler (Rough Bounce)"	3:05
12.	"Red Pill Sequence"	2:30
13.	"El Train"	2:44
14.	"Dustmen Suspense"	5:06
15.	"First Sons Suspense"	2:56
16.	"Dustmen Combat"	2:46
17.	"Dustmen Gloves Off Brawl"	3:15
18.	"Main Theme"	4:11
19.	"Fly By"	1:14
20.	"White House (Alt Version Just For Kicks)"	2:27
21.	"White House"	4:06
22.	"Conviction Menu Theme"	2:15
23.	"Roll Credits Theme"	2:52
24.	"Coste"	2:16
25.	"Corridor"	0:56
26.	"Breaking Protocol"	3:34
Total length:		69:28

Selected from scores written by Amon Tobin for various film and video games

CD 4: Rarities
No.	Title	Length
1.	"Madam Larivee"
2.	"Down by the Creek"
3.	"Return to Mother (Abduction Home)"
4.	"Lux"
5.	"Clear Skies"
6.	"Crash Test Speedster Killer"
7.	"Roots of Fools GT Killer"
8.	"Angels & Demons"
9.	"Ambient Score Level One"
10.	"Spy vs Spy vs Spy"
11.	"A6"
12.	"Black Run"
13.	"Bottle Factory Symphony"
14.	"End Game"
15.	"Future Creatures in Soup"
16.	"Mothership"
17.	"Worlds Collide (live drums by Michael Shrieve)"
18.	"Oracle (live drums by Michael Shrieve)"
19.	"Angel of Theft (co-produced by Ghostbeard)"
20.	"Hydraulics"
21.	"The Third Hand"
22.	"Bad Dream"
23.	"Breathe in Rhythm"
24.	"Computer Game"
25.	"Dot"
26.	"Experiment"
27.	"Lula"
28.	"Upwards"

Section 1, entitled The Lost Scores, are tracks 1–16. Section 2, entitled Mike Schrieve collaboration, are tracks 17–18. Section 3, entitled Old Dub Plates, are tracks 19–21. And section 4, entitled Teenage Experiments, are tracks 22–28.

CD 5: ISAM Reinterpretations
No.	Title	Length

CD 6: Recent Excursions & Remixes
No.	Title	Length

Adapted for orchestra by Ilan Eshkeri.

CD 7: The London Metropolitan Orchestra live at the Royal Albert Hall
No.	Title	Original version on:	Length
1.	"At the End of the Day"	Foley Room	5:24
2.	"Theme from Battery"	Chaos Theory – Splinter Cell 3 Soundtrack	4:47
3.	"Introducing the Sun"		2:13
4.	"Searchers"	Out from Out Where	6:23
5.	"Bloodstone"	Foley Room	4:20
6.	"Horsefish"	Foley Room	4:14
7.	"Taxidermia"	Taxidermia EP	4:43
8.	"Lost and Found"	ISAM	5:48
Total length:			63:53

EP 1: ISAM Extra Tracks
No.	Title	Length
1.	"Carry On Marmaduke"
2.	"Morning Ms Candis"
3.	"One Last Look"
4.	"Ode To Morricone"

EP 2: ISAM Reinterpretations
No.	Title	Length
1.	"Wooden Toy (Kwes./[o=o]. Rework)"
2.	"Piece of Paper (Extra Interpretation by Matthew Bourne & Sam Hobbs)"
3.	"Surge (Pete Wareham Extended Translation)"
4.	"Surge (Extended Cover by Julia Kent)"

EP 3: ISAM Reinterpretations
No.	Title	Length
1.	"Madam Larivee"
2.	"Down by the Creek"
3.	"Return To Mother (Abduction Home)"
4.	"Lost & Found (Machinefabriek Deconstruction)"

EP 4: ISAM Reinterpretations
No.	Title	Length
1.	"Amon Tobin & Noisia 'Sunhammer' (VIP Version)"
2.	"Noisia 'Machine Gun' (Amon Tobin Remix)"
3.	"Eskamon 'Fine Objects'"

EP 5: ISAM Reinterpretations
No.	Title	Length
1.	"Dark Road"
2.	"Overforces"
3.	"Hesperium"
4.	"Stupid IDM'z"

EP 6: Taxidermia Score
No.	Title	Length
1.	"Chase"
2.	"Blood Sweat and More Blood"
3.	"Taxidermia"
4.	"Run"
5.	"Bath Scene (Here Comes The Moon Man)"
6.	"Rural Soldiers"
7.	"Introducing the Son"
8.	"Factory Training"

Previously released digitally on 11 June 2008.

DVD 1: ISAM Live
No.	Title	Length

DVD 2: Videos
No.	Title	Length
