= Two Fingers (disambiguation) =

"Two Fingers" is a song by Jake Bugg.

Two Fingers or Two fingers can also refer to:

- Two Fingers, a musical project consisting of Amon Tobin and Doubleclick
- Two-finger salute
- V sign
