= Olympic Iliad =

Sculpture in Seattle, Washington, U.S.

- Artist: Alexander Liberman
- Year: 1984
- Type: Sculpture
- Medium: Steel
- Location: Seattle, Washington, United States; 47.6194°N 122.3501°W

Olympic Iliad, also known as Pasta Tube, is a 1984 steel sculpture by Alexander Liberman, located in the lawn surrounding the Space Needle at Seattle Center in Seattle, Washington, United States. The work includes large steel cylinders cut at different angles and lengths, painted red. The sculpture is similar to Liberman's Iliad, located at the Storm King Art Center in Mountainville, New York. It is featured on the cover of Brazilian musician Amon Tobin's album Bricolage.
