= Double click (disambiguation) =

Double click may refer to:

- Double-click, the act of pressing a computer mouse twice quickly without moving it
- DoubleClick, a subsidiary of Google that develops and provides Internet ad serving services
- Doubleclick (musician), a UK musician
- The Doubleclicks, an American musical duo
