= Supermodified =

Supermodified may refer to:

- Supermodified (album), a 2000 album by Amon Tobin
- Supermodified racing, a class of open wheel race car that races on short tracks in North America
