= Tom Clancy's Splinter Cell: Chaos Theory =

2005 video game

- North American cover art
- Developers: Ubisoft Montreal; Ubisoft Milan (Note: Ubisoft Annecy worked on the multiplayer part; N-Gage, Nintendo DS and mobile versions were done by Gameloft.)
- Publisher: Ubisoft
- Directors: Clint Hocking; Patrick Fortier
- Producer: Andre Roy
- Designers: Christine Blondeau; Francois Lapikas
- Programmer: Dominic Guay
- Artists: Jean-Sebastian Morin; Martin Dubeau
- Writers: Clint Hocking; Morgan Jaffit; Alexis Nolent
- Composers: Amon Tobin; Jesper Kyd
- Series: Tom Clancy's Splinter Cell
- Engine: Unreal Engine 2
- Platforms: Mobile (Java); N-Gage; Windows; PlayStation 2; Xbox; GameCube; Nintendo DS; Nintendo 3DS; PlayStation 3
- Release: March 29, 2005: Windows, PlayStation 2, Xbox; NA: March 29, 2005; EU: April 1, 2005 GameCube; NA: March 30, 2005; EU: April 1, 2005; AU: April 14, 2005 N-Gage; NA: March 31, 2005 Mobile; WW: April 7, 2005 Nintendo DS; NA: June 28, 2005; EU: July 1, 2005 Nintendo 3DS; EU: March 25, 2011; AU: March 31, 2011; NA: April 10, 2011 PlayStation 3; EU/AUS: September 16, 2011; NA: September 27, 2011
- Genres: Action-adventure, stealth
- Modes: Single-player, multiplayer

Tom Clancy's Splinter Cell: Chaos Theory is a 2005 action-adventure stealth game co-developed by Ubisoft Montreal and Ubisoft Milan, and published by Ubisoft. The game was released for GameCube, PlayStation 2, Windows and Xbox in March 2005. Handheld versions for the Nintendo DS, mobile, and N-Gage were also released.

Splinter Cell: Chaos Theory is the sequel to Splinter Cell: Pandora Tomorrow and the third game in the Splinter Cell series endorsed by novelist Tom Clancy. As with previous entries in the franchise, Chaos Theory follows the activities of Sam Fisher, an agent working for a covert-ops branch within the NSA called "Third Echelon". The game has a significantly darker tone than its predecessors, featuring more combat and the option for Fisher to kill people he interrogates instead of merely knocking them out. As a result, it was the first Splinter Cell game to receive an M-rating by the ESRB, an assessment which has since been applied to all subsequent releases in the series. Actor Michael Ironside reprised his role as Fisher. Don Jordan returned from the original game to voice Third Echelon director Irving Lambert, and Claudia Besso returned as the hacker and analyst Anna Grímsdóttir, having both been replaced by Dennis Haysbert and Adriana Anderson, respectively, in Pandora Tomorrow.

Chaos Theory's Xbox and PC versions of the game received critical acclaim; the GameCube and PlayStation 2 iterations were also released to generally positive reviews. Chaos Theory was a commercial success, selling 2.5 million units across all platforms within a month of its release. Official Xbox Magazine named it the Xbox "Game of the Year" (2005) for its strong gameplay and lifelike graphics, and it received the highest-ever review score for the magazine at the time. It is considered one of the greatest video games ever made. Another port titled Tom Clancy's Splinter Cell 3D was released for the Nintendo 3DS in March 2011. A remastered high definition version was released on PlayStation 3 in September 2011, and an Xbox version was made available for Xbox One via backward compatibility in June 2019. A sequel, titled Double Agent, released in 2006.

== Gameplay ==
Sam Fisher is grabbing a special ops member for interrogation.

The game features significant changes and improvements to the series' basic gameplay. Chaos Theory is also the first game in the Splinter Cell series to use ragdoll physics.

Chaos Theory features refined stealth mechanics. In addition to the standard light bar, the game also features an aural monitor that measures Sam's noise, along with the ambient noise of the environment. It is important for Sam to make less noise than his surroundings; otherwise, the enemy guards will hear him. The more sounds the player makes will gradually increase the stress levels of the guards, and they will become more alarmed as the level progresses.

The artificial intelligence in general has received an overhaul to its design ranging from how they interact with the environment, to interacting with each other. They will move furniture to create cover, detect changes in the environment (such as whether or not scanners have been hacked, lights have been shot or turned off, doors left open, and materials have been cut), will use team-based tactics to provide covering fire and flank Sam, and even light flares in dark environments to possibly reveal where the player may be hiding, and even detect Sam through seeing his reflection in a mirror. Certain levels of alarm in a level may also cause them to don heavier armor and create choke points, cutting off access to certain entry-ways, attempting to ambush Sam.

The AI detection has been altered as well. After Sam left an area in former titles, the game would sweep the previous area for all unconscious or dead bodies in a well-lit spot. If any were found, an alarm would be triggered. In Chaos Theory, the bodies must be discovered by a patrolling guard or security camera to trigger an alarm.

Being spotted by enemies will still trigger alarms, and alarms will still cause enemies to become more alert and combat-ready (such as causing them to wear ballistic vests and helmets). However, triggering too many alarms will no longer cause the game to end automatically. Even killing civilians or friendly soldiers may not cause Fisher to fail the mission, although doing so will at least cause Fisher to be severely chastised by his superior and cost him significantly his mission score, as well as cancelling some mission objectives, such as tapping phone lines and locating covert listening devices.

Chaos Theory adds a combat knife to Sam's close-quarters combat abilities. Sam can use the knife in multiple ways, such as threatening an enemy during an interrogation, killing an enemy in close-quarters combat, breaking door locks as opposed to picking them, or piercing gas tanks on generators to aid in his stealth operations. Also, it no longer matters what direction Sam attacks from when using melee attacks, nor does it matter if enemies are aware of his presence, as opposed to earlier entries in the series where he had to attack from behind or on the side and the enemy could not be alerted to him in order to take them down in one hit. Sam also can use lethal or non-lethal force when ending an interrogation and with his close-range attacks. As an expansion on Sam's ability to shoot while hanging upside down (introduced in Pandora Tomorrow), he can now choke down or break the neck of enemies below him. He can also pull people over railings while hanging off a ledge and throw bodies off cliffs or over railings, even onto other guards. However, the ability to shoot around corners has been removed, but this is balanced by being able to switch the side of Sam's body the gun is on while in a firing position.

In terms of weaponry, Fisher can choose from one of three different equipment "kits." There is Redding's recommended kit, an assault kit and a stealth kit. Redding's Recommendation gives Sam an even balance between ammunition and non-lethal weaponry. Assault provides more ammunition at the expense of non-lethal weapons, while the Stealth kit contains more non-lethal weaponry but less 'brute force' which means reduced lethal weaponry and spare magazines. On missions where an objective is to cause no fatalities, the player cannot choose the Assault option.

The 5-7 SC Pistol returns, though the laser pointer featured in Pandora Tomorrow is replaced with a new feature: the OCP (Optically Channeled Potentiator). When fired at certain electronics, the OCP can disable them for a limited time. Fisher can disable lights, security cameras, and more. If the device cannot be disabled, it will temporarily malfunction, such as causing the blue screen of death when attacking computer towers. When Fisher successfully disables the electronic device he aimed at, a green light appears on the pistol; if he misses, a red light appears. In both cases, Fisher must wait for the OCP to recharge and become ready for use again.

The SC-20K returns with many new attachments, such as a foregrip that reduces recoil and increases accuracy, a launcher that fires non-lethal weaponry, an under-barrel shotgun attachment for close quarters firing, and a prototype 20mm sniper attachment for long-range combat. The SC-20K now uses a reflex sight that zooms to 1.5x magnification, while the sniper scope allows from 1.5x to 3.5x magnification.

A large variety of non-lethal weaponry can be fired from the SC-20K launcher, such as the Sticky Camera, the Sticky Shocker, the Airfoil Round, and the Gas Grenade. The Sticky Camera will reveal an image of the area in which it was shot. It can also make a clicking sound that will attract enemies and emit a CS gas that will render any enemies in the immediate area unconscious. In contrast to former titles, Sam can now use multiple cameras simultaneously. He can switch back to any Sticky Camera that has not been destroyed by using the CS gas attack or due to enemy fire. The Sticky Shocker will shock and incapacitate its target when fired. If shot into a body of water, the shocker will incapacitate all targets in the water. The Airfoil Round is a hollow metal ring that will knock out the target. It is still possible for an unconscious enemy to die if shot, dropped from a considerable height or dropped into water, no matter how shallow.

Fisher also has multiple types of grenades. There is a gas grenade, which emits a cloud of CS gas that knocks enemies unconscious, a smoke grenade, which provides Fisher with a cloud of smoke to hide in, the flashbang, which will temporarily blind and deafen any enemy near it, and the fragmentation grenade, which will kill any enemy within its blast radius, and send objects flying in all directions. The Wallmine also returns from previous installments; a wall-mounted explosive equipped with a motion sensor that detonates when enemies move in front of it.

=== Multiplayer ===
GameIndustry.biz

"To be clear - I do not mean I didn't remember what we did or what we talked about. I mean that I literally had no memory of the events. To me it was like it never happened. It was like he never visited. There was just an empty space in my brain that had been overwritten by the stress and anxiety of Splinter Cell. Splinter Cell: Chaos Theory gave me brain damage."

— Clink Hocking, https://www.gamesindustry.biz/splinter-cell-chaos-theory-gave-me-brain-damage

Chaos Theory features competitive and cooperative multiplayer. The cooperative mode expands play by allowing two agents to play through a unique seven-mission story mode that parallels the single-player campaign. It is playable via system link or over Xbox Live. The cooperative campaign follows the story of two Splinter Cells in training, merely known as Agent One and Agent Two. Their training is interrupted when a world crisis occurs that requires the Shadownet division of the NSA to deploy additional resources, even including agents not adequately trained. The missions become a trial by fire for the two new agents. Though players can operate alone, the level design is such that it encourages teamwork. Ubisoft eventually developed two additional levels for download for the PC and Xbox versions. The Nuclear Plant and UN Headquarters missions are meant to end the story for the cooperative component.

In Splinter Cell Chaos Theory VS mode, two additional gameplay modes have been added to the game. New game modes include disk hunt, which consists of spies grabbing disks placed throughout the level, then returning the disks to their extraction point. The other game mode is deathmatch, which consists of killing players on the opposite team-spies or mercenaries.

The Spy vs. Mercenary game mode returns from Pandora Tomorrow with many improvements. These include new gadgets for both teams, cooperative moves for the spy team, and improved close-quarters combat for the mercenaries. Spies are armed with non-lethal weaponry and rely on stealth, skill, and gadgets. Spies can only kill mercenaries by breaking their necks, dropping on them, and hanging from a ledge and pulling them down. The spies' gadgets also do not generally affect other spies. Mercenaries are the heavily armed enemies of the SHADOWNET spies, who have access to lethal weaponry.

== Plot ==
In June 2007, tensions are running high between China, North Korea, South Korea, and Japan due to Japan's formation of an Information Self Defense Force (I-SDF). Considering this to be a violation of Article 9 of the post-World War II Constitution and blaming the I-SDF for information warfare attacks against their countries, Chinese and North Korean forces establish a blockade in the Yellow Sea against Japanese shipping. As Japan is an ally of the United States and, by extension, the NSA's Third Echelon, the US Navy dispatches an advanced warship, the USS Clarence E. Walsh (CG-80), to the Yellow Sea, with hopes that China and North Korea will back down.

Sam Fisher is dispatched to a lighthouse on the Talara, Peru coastline, to locate Bruce Morgenholt, an American computer programmer who has been captured by a Peruvian separatist group led by Salvadoran revolutionary Hugo Lacerda. Morgenholt was working on deciphering the "Masse Kernels", highly advanced weaponized algorithms developed by Phillip Masse, whom Fisher had assassinated in 2005. Fisher is tasked with ensuring the Kernels do not fall into the wrong hands. He arrives too late to prevent Morgenholt's death and the release of the Masse Kernels. Fisher boards Lacerda's ship and assassinates him. Unknown parties use the algorithms to blackout Japan and the Eastern Seaboard. Admiral Toshiro Otomo of the I-SDF warns Third Echelon that North Korea and China are likely responsible.

Following a lead discovered in Panama, Fisher travels to New York to investigate Abrahim Zherkezhi, a man who worked with Morgenholt. He finds that Displace International, a US-based private military corporation owned by his old friend Douglas Shetland, is protecting Zherkezhi. Fisher breaks into the Displace offices and learns of Milan Nedich, a Bosnian Serb arms supplier and war criminal, who has relocated Zherkezhi to Hokkaido. There, Fisher meets with Shetland, who claims that Nedich is clean. Fisher infiltrates the hideout that Zherkezhi is being held in, kills Nedich, and witnesses Shetland murdering Zherkezhi. Shetland escapes and goes underground.

The US show of force backfires when the Clarence E. Walsh is sunk by a North Korean anti-ship missile on July 4, 2007, bringing North Korea, South Korea, and the United States to the brink of war. Since North Korea claims the missile was launched unintentionally, Fisher is sent to the missile battery that fired it to determine the cause. Fisher discovers that North Korea was telling the truth, but the country suddenly launches a full-scale invasion of South Korea. Fisher heads to Seoul and learns that Displace International orchestrated the war; Shetland used the Kernels gained from Zherkezhi to hijack North Korea's missile systems and sink the Clarence E. Walsh to draw the United States into a war to "tear it all down, and start over", declaring that politicians and bureaucrats are letting the country die. Third Echelon sends Fisher to a bathhouse in Tokyo to spy on a meeting between Shetland and his accomplices, who turn out to be the I-SDF. At the meeting, the I-SDF betrays Shetland, and a firefight breaks out between Shetland's soldiers and I-SDF troops; amidst the chaos, Fisher pursues Shetland to the roof. After a standoff in which Shetland tests their friendship against fealty to the US, Fisher kills Shetland.

Following Shetland's death, and having acquired a copy of the Kernels from him, Otomo attempts to return Japan to Imperial rule; he blackmails Japanese government officials and senior JSDF officers by threatening to use the algorithms to launch a North Korean nuclear missile against a Japanese city. As China would support North Korea, and the United States would support Japan, such an incident would likely spark World War III. Although Otomo's loyalist I-SDF soldiers manage to repel attacking JSDF soldiers, Fisher infiltrates the lowest levels of the I-SDF headquarters and stops Otomo's plans. Otomo attempts to commit seppuku, but Fisher saves his life and captures him. Otomo stands trial at the United Nations and takes full responsibility for the entire Korean crisis, returning stability to the region.

== Development and release ==
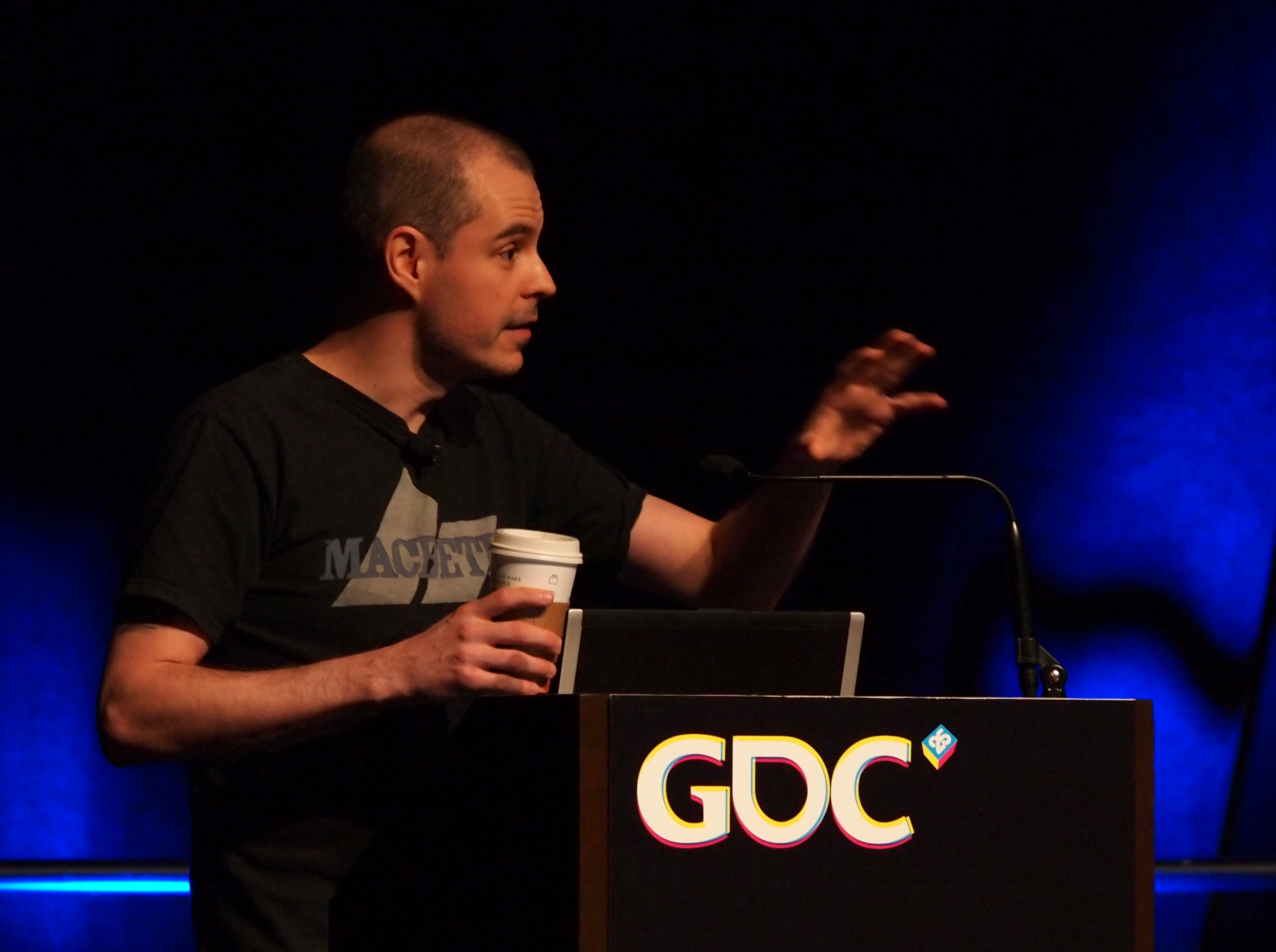
Hocking at Game Developers Conference in 2011.

The graphics in Chaos Theory feature several improvements, including the addition of normal mapping, HDR lighting, and parallax mapping. The game had a development budget of $10 million and a marketing budget of $10 million. Around 300 people worked on the game at its peak.

Because this game depicts a war between North Korea and South Korea, it was banned in South Korea until 2007.

=== Limited Collector's Edition ===
A Limited Collector's Edition was available for PC, PS2, Xbox, and GameCube. Each version is packaged in a collectible tin, and the PC, PS2, and Xbox versions include the following bonus features on an extra disc:

- Exclusive G4 "Making of" Video
- Music from the official Chaos Theory soundtrack by Amon Tobin
- Development Team video diaries
- Penny Arcade Spy Training Manual (not included in the Xbox version)
- Mega 64 Videos

The PC version also contains the version 1.3 patch for the original Splinter Cell to add the Kola Cell, Vselka Infiltration, and Vselka Submarine missions that were initially only available as downloadable content on Xbox Live. The initial release contained a corrupt patch that would not install and had to be requested separately from Ubisoft, after which they would send a CD-R with the patch. The bonus disc can also be obtained with the GameCube version by contacting Ubisoft.com via e-mail. The Xbox version also contains the XBL missions on disc 2, which can be installed on the PC version of the original Splinter Cell.

== Soundtrack ==
Chaos Theory – The Soundtrack to Tom Clancy's Splinter Cell: Chaos Theory

Soundtrack album by Amon Tobin
- Released: January 25, 2005
- Recorded: Buenos Aires, 2004
- Genres: Breakbeat, drum and bass, IDM
- Length: 48:20
- Label: Ninja Tune

Amon Tobin chronology
Out from Out Where (2002)	Chaos Theory – The Soundtrack to Tom Clancy's Splinter Cell: Chaos Theory (2005)	Foley Room (2007)

Chaos Theory – The Soundtrack to Tom Clancy's Splinter Cell: Chaos Theory is the fifth album by Brazilian electronic music artist Amon Tobin. It was released on January 25, 2005 by Ninja Tune. Seminal composer Jesper Kyd was also hired to score the game's cinematics.

The album consists of a collection of songs Tobin wrote for the game. Ubisoft was so pleased with Tobin's work that they decided to release the album several months ahead of the actual game. In-game music sequences are similar but not identical to the official soundtrack, as most in-game music is produced by layering different sequences together. This album showcased the beginning of Tobin's shift from collecting samples from vinyl records to recording his samples.

For the recording of Chaos Theory – Splinter Cell 3 Soundtrack, Tobin hired a live band whose members ranged from Mexican composer Nacho Méndez to Japanese flutist Eiji Miyake. In the CD's liner notes, Tobin noted that "it was a real special session" to have Mendez, Eiji, and the Modugno brothers working on the album. Tobin would more fully explore the use of his samples by using field recordings in the following 2007 album, Foley Room.

== Reception ==
Reception

Aggregate scores
Aggregator	Score
GameRankings	(Xbox) 94% (PC) 91% (PS2) 89% (Mobile) 87% (NGE) 86% (GC) 81% (3DS) 54% (DS) 51%
Metacritic	(Xbox) 94/100 (PC) 92/100 (PS2) 87/100 (NGE) 85/100 (GC) 81/100 (3DS) 53/100 (DS) 50/100

Review scores
Publication	Score
Electronic Gaming Monthly	(Xbox) 9.5 out of 10 (DS) 3.83 out of 10
Eurogamer	(PC) 8 out of 10 (DS) 5 out of 10 (3DS) 4 out of 10
Game Informer	9.75 out of 10 (PS2) 9.25 out of 10 (3DS) 5 out of 10
GamePro	(Xbox) 4.5/5 (3DS) 4/5
GameRevolution	A− (PS2 & GC) B (3DS) D (DS) D−
GameSpot	8.6 out of 10 (PS2) 7.1 out of 10 (GC) 6.7 out of 10 (DS) 5.6 out of 10 (3DS) 5.5 out of 10
GameSpy	5/5 (PC & NGE) 4.5/5 (GC) 3.5/5 (DS) 2.5/5
GameTrailers	9.5 out of 10
GameZone	(Xbox) 9.7 out of 10 (PC) 9.1 out of 10 (NGE) 9 out of 10 (PS2) 8.9 out of 10 (GC) 8.7 out of 10
IGN	9.6 out of 10 (NGE) 8.8 out of 10 (GC) 8.5 out of 10 (PS2) 8.4 out of 10 (3DS) 6.5 out of 10 (DS) 6 out of 10
Nintendo Power	(GC) 4.1 out of 5 (DS) 8 out of 10 (3DS) 5.5 out of 10
Official U.S. PlayStation Magazine	5/5
Official Xbox Magazine (US)	9.9 out of 10
PC Gamer (US)	91%
Detroit Free Press	3/4
The Sydney Morning Herald	(Xbox) 5/5 (DS) 2.5/5

Awards
Publication	Award
E3	2004 Game Critics Awards: Best PC Game; Best Action/Adventure Game; Special Commendation for Graphics
Game Informer	"Top 50 Games of 2005"
Official Xbox Magazine	"#1 Xbox Game of the Year, 2005"
IGN	Editors' Choice Award

Splinter Cell: Chaos Theory received "universal acclaim" from critics for the Xbox and PC versions, while the PlayStation 2, N-Gage, and GameCube versions received "favorable" reviews, and the 3DS and DS versions received "mixed" reviews, according to review aggregator website Metacritic.

A 2013 IGN review described Chaos Theory as a "peak" in the series. Shawn Elliott of 1UP.com gave the Xbox version an A and said that it "isn't the cruel, ball-busting taskmaster of Splinter Cells past—the exacting details don't matter so long as the duties get done, and it's a better game because of it." Rob Semsey of TeamXbox gave the game 9.8 out of 10 and said, "The formula has been tweaked to an almost perfect mix of story and engrossing gameplay that still requires more use of brain over brawn... The presentation is off the charts with mesmerizing visuals and audio production, both of which have a major impact on how you play." Edge gave the game a score of eight out of ten and said it was "the game that the original Splinter Cell was meant to deliver: a tight play experience within a trusty framework, one more of enjoyment than irritation, and a game that's no longer exclusively for fans of repeated reloading." Famitsu gave the Xbox version a score of three eights and one seven, bringing it to a total of 31 out of 40; for the PS2 version, the same magazine gave it two eights, one seven, and one six, bringing it to a total of 29 out of 40.

Avery Score of GameSpot gave the mobile version a score of 8.6 out of 10 and called it "a terrific game in its own right, even if it doesn't stray far from the established formula." Likewise, Levi Buchanan of IGN gave the same version a score of 8.8 out of 10 and said it was "definitely not a one-touch game. It's complex, but Gameloft's control scheme and pacing compensate for the limited input of a handset. Gameloft rarely stumbles with their offerings, and Chaos Theory is no exception. When it pops up on your deck, download it. Your may get that familiar feeling, but that's certainly oodles better than that rot-gut anger you feel after downloading a stinker."

Non-video-game publications gave the game some favorable reviews. Maxim gave the game a perfect ten and stated: "No longer is there just one way to solve a treacherous night mission before the enemy picks up your audio signature: stealth will pay off just as well as good old-fashioned ultraviolence." The Sydney Morning Herald gave the Xbox, PC and PS2 versions all five stars and called it "Visually spectacular and hugely rewarding." However, the same newspaper also gave the DS version half of that score (two-and-a-half stars) and said that the frustration "is compounded by the choppy, stuttering frame rate of the 3D visuals, making the already convoluted controls feel twice as sluggish. Even the menu screens seem slow to respond - a sure sign that the DS is being pushed beyond its capabilities." The New York Times gave the game a favorable review and stated that "Perhaps Sam is just getting older, perfecting his skills while losing some feistiness. His games are following the same path, with increasingly sophisticated, deep gameplay but a little less flair." Jim Schaefer of Detroit Free Press gave the Xbox version three stars out of four, stating, "I'll reserve a four-star rating for the next time this series takes big leaps. In this latest edition, there's nothing so new that you'll stop and say, 'Whoa.' But Chaos Theory is true to the things that make Splinter Cell games so good."

=== Sales ===
Splinter Cell: Chaos Theory was a commercial success, selling 2.5 million units by the end of March 2005. By March 17, 2005, the series had sold an overall total of 10 million copies.

=== Awards ===
Chaos Theory was a finalist for PC Gamer US's "Best Action Game 2005" and "Best Multiplayer Game 2005" awards, which ultimately went to F.E.A.R. and Battlefield 2, respectively. During the 9th Annual Interactive Achievement Awards, the Academy of Interactive Arts & Sciences nominated Chaos Theory for "Action/Adventure Game of the Year", "Outstanding Achievement in Sound Design", and "Outstanding Character Performance - Male".
