= Taxidermia =

- Theatrical release poster
- Directed by: György Pálfi
- Written by: György Pálfi; Zsófia Ruttkay
- Based on: short stories by Lajos Parti Nagy
- Produced by: Péter Miskolczi; Gábor Váradi
- Starring: Csaba Czene; Gergely Trócsányi; Piroska Molnár; Adél Stanczel
- Cinematography: Gergely Pohárnok
- Edited by: Réka Lemhényi
- Music by: Amon Tobin
- Production companies: Amour Fou Filmproduktion; Eurofilm Stúdió; Katapult Film; La Cinéfacture; Memento Films Production
- Distributed by: Pool Filmverlieh (Austria); Memento Films (France)
- Release dates: 3 February 2006 (Hungarian Film Festival); 19 May 2006 (Cannes); 9 November 2006 (Hungary)
- Running time: 94 minutes
- Countries: Hungary; Austria; France
- Languages: Hungarian; English; Russian
- Budget: HUF 500 million (US$2.4 million)
- Box office: $11,408 (US)

Taxidermia is a 2006 satirical comedy-drama surrealist body horror film directed and co-written by György Pálfi. An international co-production of Hungary, Austria and France, the film spins a metaphorical socio-political retelling of Hungary's history from the Second World War to the present day.

With elements of dark comedy and body horror, the story is told by means of three generations of Hungarian men, commencing with a WWII military orderly, moving on to a Cold War-era aspiring speed-eater, and concluding with a modern-day taxidermist. It received positive reviews.

== Plot ==
At a remote Hungarian military outpost, orderly Vendel Morosgoványi performs menial labor for lieutenant Öreg Balatony Kálmán and Öreg's family while sleeping in an unheated shack next to the latrines. Morosgoványi frequently escapes into highly vivid, perverse sexual fantasies. In one ambiguous instance, Morosgoványi has sex with and impregnates Öreg's wife and "wakes up" to find himself engaged in an act of sodomy with a slaughtered pig. Upon seeing this, Öreg fatally shoots Morosgovány. Months later, Öreg's wife gives birth to a son, Kálmán Balatony, who is born with a pig's tail. Öreg immediately cuts off Kálmán's tail, proceeding to raise the boy as his own.

Decades later, Kálmán is a champion speed-eater. Influenced by his strict coach and uncle, Jenő, Kálmán's life revolves around training for the day the International Olympic Committee eventually recognizes speed-eating as a legitimate sport. He loses a Soviet competition due to lockjaw, much to Jenő's frustration. Kálmán later elopes with fellow speed-eating champion Gizi Aczél, who soon becomes pregnant with their first child. When Gizi suffers severe abdominal pain after a speed-eating demonstration, Kálmán advises her to halt all speed-eating activities until the birth of their child out of concern for her health. She later gives birth to their son, Lajoska Balatony. Kálmán continues to rigorously train throughout Gizi's pregnancy and during the first few years of Lajoska's life, prioritizing speed-eating over his relationship and family.

Some years later, Gizi has left Kálmán and Lajoska, who is now a professional taxidermist. Highly dedicated to his craft and desperate not to end up like either of his parents, Lajoska maintains a thin, anemic frame and attempts to lead a normal life, though he often fails due to his social awkwardness. When not working from his taxidermy shop, Lajoska purchases food for Kálmán, who has become so morbidly obese that he cannot leave the chair in his apartment. Kálmán keeps several pet cats that he adores and dotes on; conversely, he constantly berates Lajoska. After Kálmán shouts that he is ashamed of Lajoska one day, Lajoska insults him and announces that he will no longer care for him before storming out. He returns later to discover that the cats have escaped their cages and disemboweled Kálmán.

Lajoska stuffs and preserves his father's body, along with that of the cats. With little left to live for, he locks himself in a homemade surgical harness and, through the use of sedatives, painkillers, and a heart-lung machine, begins removing his own internal organs. Pumping his body full of preservatives and sewing himself up, he activates a machine that decapitates him, leaving behind a preserved statue. His body is displayed in an exhibit alongside the cats and his father.

== Cast ==
- Csaba Czene as Morosgoványi Vendel
- Gergely Trócsányi as Balatony Kálmán
- Piroska Molnár as Hadnagyné
- Adél Stanczel as Aczél Gizi
- Marc Bischoff as Balatony Lajoska
- István Gyuricza as Hadnagy
- Gábor Máté as Öreg Balatony Kálmán
- Zoltán Koppány as Miszlényi Béla
- Erwin Leder as Krisztián
- Éva Kuli as Leóna
- Lajos Parti Nagy as Dédnagypapa
- Attila Lőrinczy as Pap
- Mihály Pálfi as Baba

== Music ==
The film features music scored by electronic artist Amon Tobin, released on his 2012 compilation Boxset. It additionally contains music written by the band Hollywoodoo during the end credits. The song is entitled "Erdő" (translated as "Forest") and is from the album "Karmolok, harapok" released in 2004, which directly translated from Hungarian to English means "I Scratch, I Bite". The music video is directed by Pálfi and contains many scenes from the film including copies of scenes containing various band members.

== Release ==
Taxidermia premiered at the Hungarian Film Festival on 3 February 2006 before screening in the Un Certain Regard section at the 2006 Cannes Film Festival. It opened in France through Memento Films on 23 August 2006, Hungary on 9 November, and Austria (also in Hungary) through Pool Filmverlieh on 9 February 2007.

The film received a theatrical release, albeit limited, in the United States on 14 August 2009. It was released in two venues by Regent Releasing and grossed $11,408.

=== Critical reception ===
Despite its divisive nature, Taxidermia gained attention on the festival circuit and received several awards and nominations. It played at prestigious film festivals like Cannes and was Hungary's submission for the Best Foreign Language Film category at the 79th Academy Awards. Over the years, "Taxidermia" has developed a cult following among fans of unconventional and avant-garde cinema. Its audacity and willingness to push boundaries have contributed to its status as a cult film.

On review aggregator website Rotten Tomatoes, the film holds an approval rating of 81% based on 47 reviews, with an average rating of 6.68/10. The website's critical consensus reads, "Surreal and visually striking, Taxidermia is, at times, graphic and difficult to watch, but creatively touches on disturbing subjects with imagination and wit." On Metacritic, the film has a weighted average score of 83 out of 100, based on 9 critics, indicating "universal acclaim". Deloret Imnidian of High on Films Website writes "Taxidermia is a delicious film for those who can digest it." in his 4.5 star rated review of the film.

== See also ==
- Unsimulated sex
