= Verbal Remixes & Collaborations =

EP by Amon Tobin
- Released: July 7, 2003
- Recorded: Unknown
- Genre: Electronica
- Length: 46:32
- Label: Ninja Tune
- Producer: Amon Tobin

Amon Tobin chronology
Out From Out Where (2002)	Verbal Remixes & Collaborations (2003)	Solid Steel Presents Amon Tobin: Recorded Live (2004)

Professional ratings
Review scores
Source	Rating
Allmusic	link

Verbal Remixes & Collaborations is an EP released by Amon Tobin in 2003. It features tracks from two previously released 12" EPs: Verbal (Remixes) and Collaborations.

== Track listing ==
1. "Untitled" - Kid Koala & Amon Tobin – 5:40
2. "I'll Have The Waldorf Salad" - Bonobo & Amon Tobin – 6:28
3. "Hot Korean Moms" - P Love & Amon Tobin – 5:07
4. "Ten Piece Metric Wrench Set" - Steinski & Amon Tobin – 5:41
5. "Ownage" - Doubleclick & Amon Tobin – 6:32
6. "Verbal" (Prefuse 73 Dipped Escalade mix) – 3:14
7. "Verbal" (Topo Gigio remix) – 3:59
8. "Verbal" (Kid 606 Dancehall Devastation mix) – 4:39
9. "Verbal" (Boom Bip remix) – 5:12
