= Permutation (Amon Tobin album) =

Studio album by Amon Tobin
- Released: 1 June 1998
- Genre: Drum and bass; IDM
- Length: 70:01 (CD); 75:26 (LP)
- Label: Ninja Tune
- Producer: Amon Tobin

Amon Tobin chronology
Bricolage (1997)	Permutation (1998)	Supermodified (2000)

Singles from Permutation
- 1. "Like Regular Chickens" Released: 11 May 1998

Professional ratings
Review scores
Source	Rating
AllMusic	4.5/5 stars
Detroit Free Press	4/4 stars
The Guardian	3/5 stars
The List	5/5 stars
Pitchfork	9.8/10
Rolling Stone	4/5 stars

Permutation is the third studio album by Brazilian electronic music producer Amon Tobin. It was released on 1 June 1998 by Ninja Tune.

== Composition ==
The songs "Like Regular Chickens" and "People Like Frank" sample dialogue from, respectively, the David Lynch films Eraserhead (1977) and Blue Velvet (1986); the latter song also samples portions of Angelo Badalamenti's score for Blue Velvet.

== Release ==
Permutation was released by the Ninja Tune label on 1 June 1998. Kevin Foakes, credited under the alias Openmind, contributed photography to and designed the album's packaging. "Like Regular Chickens" was issued as a single on 11 May 1998.

The immediate period following the release of Permutation saw Tobin's profile continue to rise, and he played at venues such as the Coachella Valley Music and Arts Festival, the Knitting Factory and the Montreal International Jazz Festival.

== Track listing ==
All tracks are written by Amon Tobin.

CD edition
No.	Title	Length
1.	"Like Regular Chickens"	5:16
2.	"Bridge"	5:56
3.	"Reanimator"	6:34
4.	"Sordid"	7:11
5.	"Nightlife"	6:29
6.	"Escape"	5:54
7.	"Switch"	3:49
8.	"People Like Frank"	6:04
9.	"Sultan Drops"	5:12
10.	"Fast Eddie"	7:38
11.	"Toys"	5:16
12.	"Nova"	4:42
Total length:		70:01

LP edition
No.	Title	Length
1.	"Sordid"	7:11
2.	"Bridge"	5:56
3.	"Like Regular Chickens"	5:16
4.	"Reanimator"	6:34
5.	"Fast Eddie"	7:38
6.	"Nova"	4:42
7.	"Escape"	5:54
8.	"Nightlife"	6:29
9.	"People Like Frank"	6:04
10.	"Sultan Drops"	5:12
11.	"Switch"	3:49
12.	"Toys"	5:16
13.	"Melody Infringement"	5:25
Total length:		75:26
