= Dark Jovian =

EP by Amon Tobin
- Released: 18 April 2015
- Genre: Experimental
- Label: Ninja Tune Records
- Producer: Amon Tobin

Amon Tobin chronology
ISAM (2011)	Dark Jovian (2015)	Fear in a Handful of Dust (2019)

Dark Jovian is an EP by Brazilian electronic musician Amon Tobin. A teaser video was posted of a one-minute snippet of 'Dark Jovian' on April 10, 2015. It was released on April 18, 2015 through Ninja Tune Records as a Record Store Day exclusive. Due to a shipping delay, release in North America was postponed to May 5, 2015.

== Album ==
=== Concept ===
The EP was inspired, according to Tobin, by science fiction space exploration films and the works of composers John Williams, Jerry Goldsmith, and György Ligeti.

Tobin describes the creation process:

"...People have, from time to time, described things I've done as "scores for imaginary movies," which has always irritated me, but on this occasion it's sort of true. Even so, what I was really trying to do was to interpret a sense of scale, like moving towards impossibly giant objects until they occupy your whole field of vision, planets turning, or even how it can feel just looking up at night. I wanted it to pace very slowly, the way far off objects can seem still until you look away for a while and find they've shifted some distance when you look back. Tracks like Io work in that way; something changing gradually so you barely notice it, until at some point you no longer recognize it. "

=== Packaging ===
As part of Record Store day, it will be released on two singled sided heavyweight 180g with etched markings, encased in a white, branded, rubber wheel and housed in a transparent plastic box designed by Alexander Brown. The physical product was also inspired by the golden discs launched with both Voyager spacecraft in the 1977. However, due to shipping delay by UPS, the release date of Dark Jovian was pushed back to May 5 in North America so it will no longer be available to purchase in stores on Record Store day.

== Track listing ==
No.	Title	Length
1.	"Dark Jovian"	2:47
2.	"In Your Own Time"	3:05
3.	"Adrastea Contact"	4:20
4.	"Io"	6:35
5.	"Encounter on Io"	6:53
6.	"Encounter on Io (Lee Gamble Reshape)"	7:02
7.	"Adrastea Contact (Logos Remix)"	4:10
8.	"In Your Own Time (Eprom Remix)"	3:53
