= Adventures in Foam =

Studio album by Cujo
- Released: September 16, 1996
- Recorded: 1996
- Genres: Breakbeat, trip hop, drum and bass, nu jazz
- Length: 1:17:36 (original CD)
- Labels: Ninebar (UK; 1996); Shadow Records (US; 1996); Ninja Tune (re-release; 2002)
- Producer: Amon Tobin

Cujo chronology
Adventures in Foam (1996)	Bricolage (1997)

Professional ratings
Review scores
Source	Rating
AllMusic	3.5/5 stars
The Encyclopedia of Popular Music	2/5 stars
Muzik	3.5/5 stars
Pitchfork Media	(9.4/10)

Adventures in Foam is the first album by Brazilian electronic musician Amon Tobin, and the only one to be released under the name Cujo (after the Stephen King novel of the same name). It was first released in September 1996 on the small south London label Ninebar records. This was around when Tobin signed with Ninja Tune to record under his name.

== Critical reception ==
The Stranger, in a retrospective article on Tobin, called the album a "triphop classic."

Peter Shapiro, in Drum 'n' Bass: The Rough Guide, called the album "a further exercise in jazz-based sampladelic quirkiness that was a bit too clever, a bit too blunted and bit too broad-minded to really work."

== Track listing ==
=== Original Ninebar edition ===
The track lists of the original CD and LP versions, as released in the UK on 16 September 1996, were as follows:

No.	Title	Length
1.	"Adventures In Foam intro"	1:49
2.	"Cat People"	5:55
3.	"Northstar"	6:09
4.	"Fat Ass Joint"	5:42
5.	"Ol' Bunkhouse"	5:47
6.	"Paris Streatham"	4:57
7.	"A Vida"	4:07
8.	"Traffic"	5:52
9.	"Reef's Edge (Interval)"	1:59
10.	"The Sighting"	4:33
11.	"Break Charmer"	4:09
12.	"The Method"	6:26
13.	"On The Track"	5:43
14.	"Cruzer" (includes an untitled hidden track which starts at 12:39 after 7 minutes of silence)	14:28
Total length:		1:17:36

Side A
No.	Title	Length
1.	"The Method"	6:26
2.	"Ol' Bunkhouse"	5:47
3.	"On The Track"	5:43

Side B
No.	Title	Length
1.	"Cat People"	5:55
2.	"Break Charmer"	4:09
3.	"Fat Ass Joint"	5:42

Side C
No.	Title	Length
1.	"A Vida"	4:07
2.	"Paris Streatham"	4:57
3.	"North Star"	6:09

Side D
No.	Title	Length
1.	"Traffic"	5:52
2.	"The Sequel"	7:53
3.	"Cruzer"	14:28
Total length:		1:17:08

=== US (Shadow Records) edition ===
Unapproved cover variant.

The album was released in the United States, with an altered track listing and artwork unapproved by Tobin, by Shadow Records on 27 May 1997 – after the release of Tobin's first Ninja Tune album, Bricolage.

No.	Title	Length
1.	"Adventures In Foam Intro"
2.	"Traffic"
3.	"The Light"
4.	"Cat People"
5.	"Paris Streatham"
6.	"A Vida"
7.	"Fat Ass Joint"
8.	"The Brazilianaire"
9.	"Northstar"
10.	"Break Charmer"
11.	"Clockwork" (mistitled as "The Sequel")
12.	"Reef's Edge (Interval)"
13.	"The Sighting"
14.	"Cruzer"

=== Ninja Tune reissue ===
The Ninja Tune edition adds six tracks to the original Ninebar edition.

No.	Title	Length
1.	"Adventures In Foam intro"	1:49
2.	"Cat People"	5:55
3.	"Northstar"	6:09
4.	"Fat Ass Joint"	5:42
5.	"Ol' Bunkhouse"	5:47
6.	"Paris Streatham"	4:57
7.	"A Vida"	4:07
8.	"Traffic"	5:52
9.	"Reef's Edge (Interval)"	1:59
10.	"The Sighting"	4:33
11.	"Break Charmer"	4:09
12.	"The Method"	6:26
13.	"On The Track"	5:43
14.	"Cruzer" (includes an untitled hidden track which starts at 12:39 after 7 minutes of silence)	14:28
15.	"The Brazilianaire"	6:20
16.	"4 or 6"	5:40
17.	"Mars Brothers"	5:06
18.	"Popsicle"	4:37
19.	"The Light"	5:15
20.	"The Sequel"	7:52
Total length:		1:51:26

The sample used in track 12 "The Method" is "Walk On" by Sonny Terry & Brownie McGhee.
