= Fear in a Handful of Dust =

Studio album by Amon Tobin
- Released: 26 April 2019
- Length: 40:41
- Label: Nomark
- Producer: Amon Tobin

Amon Tobin chronology
Dark Jovian (2015)	Fear in a Handful of Dust (2019)

Fear in a Handful of Dust is the eighth studio album by Brazilian electronic musician Amon Tobin. It was released on 26 April 2019.

== Critical reception ==
Professional ratings
Review scores
Source	Rating
AllMusic	4/5 stars
Exclaim!	8/10
Sputnikmusic	4/5 stars
The Wire	4/5 stars

Paul Simpson of AllMusic described the album as "highly intricate electro-acoustic pieces that bring to mind composers like Morton Subotnick and György Ligeti rather than any of Tobin's former labelmates" but concluded that "Fear in a Handful of Dust seems like a departure for Tobin, but even while he's abandoning conventional rhythms or genre signifiers, his music remains unmistakably human, and as challenging as the album might seem, it's easier to listen to than one might expect." Daryl Keating of Exclaim! called the record Tobin's "most wistful work to date" and "the best sonic definition for imperfect beauty we've got right now", and said, "There's a very loose and purposefully flawed feel to this record... Fear in a Handful of Dust ambles through the woods in anything but a straight line." Chris Ingalls of PopMatters noted the mix of modern synthesiser sounds and old samples, stating that "while lots of electronic instrumental music seems hell-bent on simulating gleaming perfection, Tobin's universe is a cracked one, and an oddly human one at that". He went on to say, "All these descriptions of cold technology and robotic interfaces may imply that there's a lack of emotion on Fear in a Handful of Dust. Far from it... Amon Tobin is a master of creating a chilling, deeply felt musical experience, and anyone who tends to turn a blind eye to electronic music should approach this wonderful album with an open mind. It's time well-spent."

== Track listing ==
All tracks written by Amon Tobin.

1. "On a Hilltop Sat the Moon" – 3:37
2. "Vipers Follow You" – 4:18
3. "Freeformed" – 3:10
4. "Pale Forms Run By" – 4:50
5. "Heart of the Sun" – 3:23
6. "Velvet Owl" – 7:48
7. "Fooling Alright" – 3:12
8. "Milk Millionaire" – 2:14
9. "Three Different Hat Sizes" – 3:56
10. "Dark as Dogs" – 4:20
