= Bricolage (album) =

Studio album by Amon Tobin
- Released: May 19, 1997
- Genre: Drum and bass; jazz; trip hop
- Length: 79:21
- Label: Ninja Tune
- Producer: Amon Tobin

Amon Tobin chronology
Adventures in Foam (1996)	Bricolage (1997)	Permutation (1998)

Bricolage is a 1997 album by Brazilian electronic music artist Amon Tobin. It was Tobin's second album, the first released under his name, and his first on the Ninja Tune label. The album is a departure from his first album, Adventures in Foam (as Cujo), incorporating a heavier blend of jazz melodies and complex jungle rhythms. The album was followed by Permutation in 1998.

The album art for Bricolage depicts part of Alexander Liberman's Olympic Iliad sculpture, located at the base of the Space Needle in Seattle, Washington.

== Reception ==
Professional ratings
Review scores
Source	Rating
AllMusic	4/5 stars
NME	8/10
Pitchfork	10/10

Ryan Schreiber of Pitchfork gave Bricolage a maximum rating of 10/10, praising Amon Tobin for the way he produced an album of old jazz music with modern technology, such as samplers and electric keyboards. Sean Cooper of AllMusic stated that the album was consistently engaging and blurred the distinction between jungle and jazz. In 2015, Fact ranked the album at 23 on its list of "The 50 Best Trip-Hop Albums of All Time," where they described it as a midway point between IDM and the "moodier landscapes" of several trip hop artists.

== Use in film and television ==
The track "Easy Muffin" was used in Toonami advertisements for Gundam SEED as well as several episodes of IGPX. It is featured in the 2002 film Divine Intervention and in many episodes of the TV series Top Gear. It is also used in the second episode of the first season of Almost Human. "Easy Muffin" was used in Lincoln Motor Company television ads beginning in 2015. It was also used as the theme song of a French radio show, namely the France Inter's radio show called "Interception".

== Availability issues ==
In a 2017 Facebook post, Amon Tobin confirmed fan speculation that “for reasons beyond my control a number of my albums tracks listings [sic] have been altered on mainstream digital platforms” and that “a small number of my most well known [sic] tracks have also been removed” from streaming services. This is possibly due to sample clearance issues, and includes “Easy Muffin” from Bricolage, and "Four Ton Mantis" from Supermodified (2000).

== Track listing ==
CD Release
No.	Title	Length
1.	"Stoney Street"	5:53
2.	"Easy Muffin"	5:01
3.	"Yasawas"	5:24
4.	"Creatures"	5:21
5.	"Chomp Samba"	6:07
6.	"New York Editor"	4:46
7.	"Defocus"	5:10
8.	"The Nasty"	4:35
9.	"Bitter & Twisted"	5:05
10.	"Wires & Snakes"	5:27
11.	"One Day in My Garden"	5:43
12.	"Dream Sequence"	7:19
13.	"One Small Step"	6:11
14.	"Mission"	7:08
Total length:		1:19:20

Japanese edition bonus disc
No.	Title	Length
1.	"Daytrip"	5:49
2.	"Shiny Things"	6:53
3.	"Creatures" (Hidden Agenda Defocused Mix)	6:18
Total length:		19:00

LP Release
No.	Title	Length
1.	"Easy Muffin"	5:01
2.	"Yasawas"	5:24
3.	"Dream Sequence"	7:19
4.	"New York Editor"	4:46
5.	"Defocus"	5:10
6.	"The Nasty"	4:35
7.	"Bitter & Twisted"	5:05
8.	"Mission"	7:08
9.	"Wires & Snakes"	5:27
10.	"Creatures"	5:21
11.	"Stoney Street"	5:53
12.	"One Small Step"	6:11
13.	"One Day in My Garden"	5:43
Total length:		1:13:13
