= ISAM (album) =

Studio album by Amon Tobin
- Released: 19 April 2011 (digital); 23 May 2011 (physical)
- Genre: IDM; experimental; avant-garde
- Length: 49:57 (standard); 56:11 (+ bonus tracks)
- Label: Ninja Tune Records (ZEN168)
- Producer: Amon Tobin

Amon Tobin chronology
Foley Room (2007)	ISAM (2011)	Boxset (2012)

Alternative cover
- Physical release artwork

Professional ratings
Review scores
Source	Rating
Allmusic	link
Pitchfork Media	(5.9/10) link
Sputnikmusic	link
The Skinny	link

ISAM is the seventh full-length studio album by Brazilian electronic musician Amon Tobin, released on 19 April 2011 on Ninja Tune.

== Background and composition ==
ISAM, its title being an acronym for "Invented Sounds Applied to Music", marked a significant evolution in Amon Tobin's sound due to the absence of vinyl samples and trademark jazz-oriented breaks. Extending from his stylistic experimentation on Foley Room, prominent elements of ISAM include complex sound design and heavily processed field recordings obtained from a variety of sources. Several tracks also feature computer-processed androgynous vocals. Tobin described the album as a "sound sculpture" and said that his intent was to move forward from the aesthetics of his previous work.

== Release ==
ISAM was initially slated to be released on both physical and digital media on 23 May 2011, but following the leak of a promotional copy the previous month, the digital release was moved forward to 19 April. The physical release included a limited edition CD artbook featuring images from Control Over Nature, an installation conceived by Amon Tobin and Saatchi collection artist Tessa Farmer, which is thematically related to the music of ISAM. Farmer's work also features on the cover of the album.

== Track listing ==
All tracks written by Amon Tobin.

No.	Title	Length
1.	"Journeyman"	6:38
2.	"Piece of Paper"	2:40
3.	"Goto 10"	4:20
4.	"Surge"	2:05
5.	"Lost & Found"	4:54
6.	"Wooden Toy"	2:25
7.	"Mass & Spring"	4:16
8.	"Calculate"	1:33
9.	"Kitty Cat"	4:16
10.	"Bedtime Stories"	3:44
11.	"Night Swim"	5:58
12.	"Dropped from the Sky"	7:10
13.	"Morning Ms Candis" (limited edition CD and digital-only bonus track)	3:34
14.	"One Last Look" (digital-only bonus track)	2:40
Total length:		56:11

== Charts ==
Chart performance for ISAM
Chart (2012)	Peak position
Belgian Albums (Ultratop Flanders)	86
