= Foley Room =

Studio album by Amon Tobin
- Released: March 5, 2007
- Recorded: 2006
- Studio: Several locations in Montreal
- Genres: IDM; downtempo; experimental; drill 'n' bass; sound collage
- Length: 51:06
- Label: Ninja Tune
- Producer: Amon Tobin

Amon Tobin chronology
Chaos Theory - Splinter Cell 3 Soundtrack (2005)	Foley Room (2007)	ISAM (2011)

Professional ratings
Review scores
Source	Rating
Allmusic	3.5/5 stars
Beatbots	link
Crawdaddy	75% link
Drowned in Sound	(8/10) link
NOW	link
Pitchfork Media	(8.1/10) link
PopMatters	link
Three Imaginary Girls	(8/10) link
Tiny Mix Tapes	link

Foley Room is the sixth studio album by Brazilian electronic music producer Amon Tobin, released on March 5, 2007, through Ninja Tune. The album was supported by the "Bloodstone" single, which was released digitally on January 9, 2007, and physically on January 21.

== Composition ==
The album was recorded in part at the Foley effects room at Ubisoft Montreal. In the past, Tobin had created music through the sampling of old vinyl records. However, Foley Room is a marked departure from his traditional technique. Inspired by the Foley rooms where sound effects are recorded for films, Tobin decided to record and work with original samples for the record. According to the Ninja Tune website, "Amon and a team of assistants headed out into the streets with high sensitivity microphones and recorded found sounds from tigers roaring to cats eating rats, neighbours singing in the bath to ants eating grass."

Tobin also assembled a cast of diverse musicians to improvise music that was recorded as still more sampled material for the record, including Kronos Quartet, Patrick Watson, To Rococo Rot's Stefan Schneider, and harpist Sarah Pagé.

There's nothing new about field recordings of course. It's obviously been the traditional source material in sampling since the early days, so I'm really going "back to school" on this one. On the other hand, I always saw a divide between music that was based purely on sound design and tunes that were written to physically move people. A challenge for me has been to try and make 'tunes' using aspects of sound design normally associated with highbrow academic studies in this area. I don't know how successful I've been but that was a goal anyway.

— Amon Tobin, in his MySpace blog.

Among the many analog tape field recordings captured by Tobin for the album include the sounds of wild animals, "roaring motorcycles, grinding chains, the crisp clashing of automated machinery, the delicate tiptoeing of ants, dripping water and clacking train tracks."

== Release ==
The first single, "Bloodstone", was released digitally on January 9, 2007. The song was later released as a physical CD single on January 21 with the album track "Esther's" and unreleased track "Here Comes the Moon Man" also included on the disc. In promotion of the record, Ninja Tune released two YouTube "trailers". A DVD documentary detailing the album's recording process was also released with the album.

== Track listing ==
All tracks are written by Amon Tobin.

No.	Title	Length
1.	"Bloodstone"	4:13
2.	"Esther's"	3:21
3.	"Keep Your Distance"	4:48
4.	"The Killer's Vanilla"	4:14
5.	"Kitchen Sink"	4:49
6.	"Horsefish"	5:07
7.	"Foley Room"	3:37
8.	"Big Furry Head"	3:22
9.	"Ever Falling"	3:49
10.	"Always"	3:39
11.	"Straight Psyche"	6:49
12.	"At the End of the Day"	3:18
Total length:		51:06

== Charts ==
Chart performance for Foley Room
Chart (2007)	Peak position
French Albums (SNEP)	91
Belgian Albums (Ultratop Flanders)	87
