= Out from Out Where =

Studio album by Amon Tobin
- Released: 14 October 2002
- Genre: Breakbeat; drum and bass
- Length: 56:50
- Label: Ninja Tune
- Producer: Amon Tobin

Amon Tobin chronology
Supermodified (2000)	Out from Out Where (2002)	Verbal Remixes & Collaborations (2003)

Singles from Out from Out Where
- 1. "Verbal" Released: 7 October 2002

Professional ratings
Aggregate scores
Source	Rating
Metacritic	75/100
Review scores
Source	Rating
AllMusic	4.5/5 stars
Blender	4/5 stars
Entertainment Weekly	B+
The Guardian	4/5 stars
Muzik	4/5 stars
Pitchfork	8.5/10
Q	3/5 stars
Stylus Magazine	7.6/10
Tiny Mix Tapes	4/5
Uncut	2/5 stars

Out from Out Where is the fifth studio album by Brazilian electronic music producer Amon Tobin. It was released on 14 October 2002 by Ninja Tune.

== Release ==
Out from Out Where was released on 14 October 2002 by the Ninja Tune label. "Verbal" was issued as the sole single from Out from Out Where on 7 October 2002. The music video for the song was directed by Alex Rutterford and appears as bonus enhanced content on the CD edition of the album. A music video was also produced for the track "Proper Hoodidge", directed by Corine Stübi.

In 2010, Out from Out Where was awarded a gold certification by the Independent Music Companies Association, indicating sales of at least 100,000 copies in Europe.

The song Mighty Micro People appears in the 2008 racing game Need for Speed: Undercover .

== Track listing ==
All tracks are written by Amon Tobin.

No.	Title	Length
1.	"Back from Space"	4:52
2.	"Verbal" (featuring MC Decimal R.)	3:55
3.	"Chronic Tronic"	6:07
4.	"Searchers"	5:45
5.	"Hey Blondie"	4:31
6.	"Rosies"	5:22
7.	"Cosmo Retro Intro Outro"	4:07
8.	"Triple Science"	4:58
9.	"El Wraith"	5:59
10.	"Proper Hoodidge"	5:26
11.	"Mighty Micro People"	5:48
Total length:		56:50

CD edition bonus enhanced content
No.	Title	Length
1.	"Verbal" (video)	3:26

== Personnel ==
Credits are adapted from the album's liner notes.

- Amon Tobin – production
- MC Decimal R. – performance on "Verbal"
- Openmind – design
- She-1 – logo design

== Charts ==
Chart (2002)	Peak position
French Albums (SNEP)	57
UK Albums (OCC)	197
UK Independent Albums (OCC)	32
US Heatseekers Albums (Billboard)	43
US Independent Albums (Billboard)	32
