= Supermodified (album) =

Studio album by Amon Tobin
- Released: 16 May 2000
- Genre: Breakbeat; Downtempo; Future jazz; drum and bass; IDM
- Length: 67:15
- Label: Ninja Tune
- Producer: Amon Tobin

Amon Tobin chronology
Permutation (1998)	Supermodified (2000)	Out from Out Where (2002)

Singles from Supermodified
- 1. "Slowly" Released: 1 May 2000; 2. "Four Ton Mantis" Released: 4 September 2000

Supermodified is the fourth studio album by Brazilian electronic music producer Amon Tobin. It was released on 16 May 2000 by Ninja Tune.

Tobin's official website defined the title of the album as:

- modification: the act of modifying, state of being modified; change made in vowel by mutation, graphic representation of this
- super: on the top (of); over; beyond; besides; in addition; exceeding; going beyond; more

== Release ==
Supermodified was released by the Ninja Tune label on 16 May 2000 in the United States and on 22 May 2000 in the United Kingdom. Two singles were issued from the album: "Slowly" on 1 May 2000 and "Four Ton Mantis" on 4 September 2000. Music videos were produced for both "Slowly" (directed by Ben Rivers and Jeremy Butler) and "Four Ton Mantis" (directed by Floria Sigismondi).

In 2012, Supermodified was awarded a double silver certification by the Independent Music Companies Association, signifying sales of at least 40,000 copies in Europe.

== Reception ==
Professional ratings
Aggregate scores
Source	Rating
Metacritic	85/100
Review scores
Source	Rating
AllMusic	4.5/5 stars
Dotmusic	4.5/5 stars
Entertainment Weekly	B
Melody Maker	4/5 stars
Pitchfork	9.1/10
Q	3/5 stars
Stylus	9.4/10

At Metacritic, which assigns a normalised rating out of 100 to reviews from professional publications, Supermodified received an average score of 85 based on eight reviews, indicating "universal acclaim". Pitchfork critic Taylor M. Clark found it more accessible than Tobin's previous albums, as well as more cohesive: "Everything just fits together so well, like Lego blocks making a castle." John Bush of AllMusic wrote that Tobin had "again made great strides in his production skills, and the range and greatness of this material serves as proof positive."

== Use in film and television ==
- "Natureland", "Slowly" and "Get Your Snack On" were used in the movie coverage of the 2003 Gumball 3000 Rally.
- "Saboteur" was used in the 2003 remake of The Italian Job.
- "Slowly" was used in the 2006 film Candy, as well as ES footwear's film, "Menikmati".
- "Four Ton Mantis" was used in a commercial for "Death Note" on Adult Swim, Paul Rodriguez's "Forecast" skateboarding video for Mike Mo Capaldi's segment, a Molson M commercial. and a commercial for the Nissan Qashqai.
- "Chocolate Lovely" has been used on Adult Swim's commercial bumps.
- "Deo" was used in a Coca-Cola commercial.
- "Get Your Snack On" and "Deo" were used in the 2005 anime "IGPX".
- "Get Your Snack On" was used in season 8, episode 13 of American Dad!.
- "Get Your Snack On" and "Four Ton Mantis" have been used in various Toonami bumps.
- "Rhino Jockey" was used in the movie Project X.
- "Natureland" was used on Channel 4's TV promotional spot for its Stanley Kubrick season.

== Availability issues ==
In a 2017 Facebook post, Amon Tobin confirmed fan speculation that “for reasons beyond my control a number of my albums tracks listings [sic] have been altered on mainstream digital platforms” and that “a small number of my most well known [sic] tracks have also been removed” from streaming services. This is possibly due to sample clearance issues, and includes “Easy Muffin” from Bricolage (1997), and "Four Ton Mantis" from Supermodified.

== Track listing ==
All tracks are written by Amon Tobin.

No.	Title	Length
1.	"Get Your Snack On"	4:22
2.	"Four Ton Mantis"	4:45
3.	"Slowly"	5:37
4.	"Marine Machines"	5:45
5.	"Golfer vrs Boxer"	6:17
6.	"Deo"	6:44
7.	"Precursor" (featuring Quadraceptor)	4:39
8.	"Saboteur"	5:18
9.	"Chocolate Lovely"	6:03
10.	"Rhino Jockey"	7:28
11.	"Keepin' It Steel (The Anvil Track)"	4:29
12.	"Natureland"	5:48
Total length:		67:15

Notes

- The track order for the LP edition repositions "Chocolate Lovely" between "Keepin' It Steel (The Anvil Track)" and "Natureland".

== Personnel ==
Credits are adapted from the album's liner notes.

- Amon Tobin – production
- Openmind – artwork, design
- Quadraceptor – beatboxing on "Precursor"
- She 1 – typography
- Haig Vartzbedian – recording on "Precursor"
- Voda – mastering

== Charts ==
Chart (2000)	Peak position
UK Independent Albums (OCC)	39
