= Doubleclick (musician) =

- Born: Joe Chapman; United Kingdom
- Occupations: DJ, record producer
- Years active: 2000-present

Joe Chapman, known by his stage name Doubleclick, and is a British DJ, musician and producer.

He released Once More with Feeling EP on Brighton-based label, Fly Casual, in 2000. He later collaborated with Amon Tobin on Verbal Remixes & Collaborations in 2003. In 2009, he and Amon Tobin, under the name Two Fingers, released a self-titled album and a corresponding album of instrumentals. His musical influences include Drum & Bass and Jungle music.

== Discography ==
=== Albums and collaborations ===
- Once More with Feeling EP (2000, Fly Casual)
  - Tracks: "Once More with Feeling", "All in One Light", "War Peace and Quiet"
- Amon Tobin - Verbal Remixes & Collaborations (2003, Ninja Tune)
- Two Fingers as Two Fingers (2009 Paper Bag Records)
- Instrumentals as Two Fingers (2009 Paper Bag Records)

=== Verbal remixes and collaborations ===
"Ownage courtesy Tobin and Doubleclick, is the type of track you'd play to permanently scar the neighbors." -weeklydig.com (2003)
