= Amon Tobin =

Brazilian musician

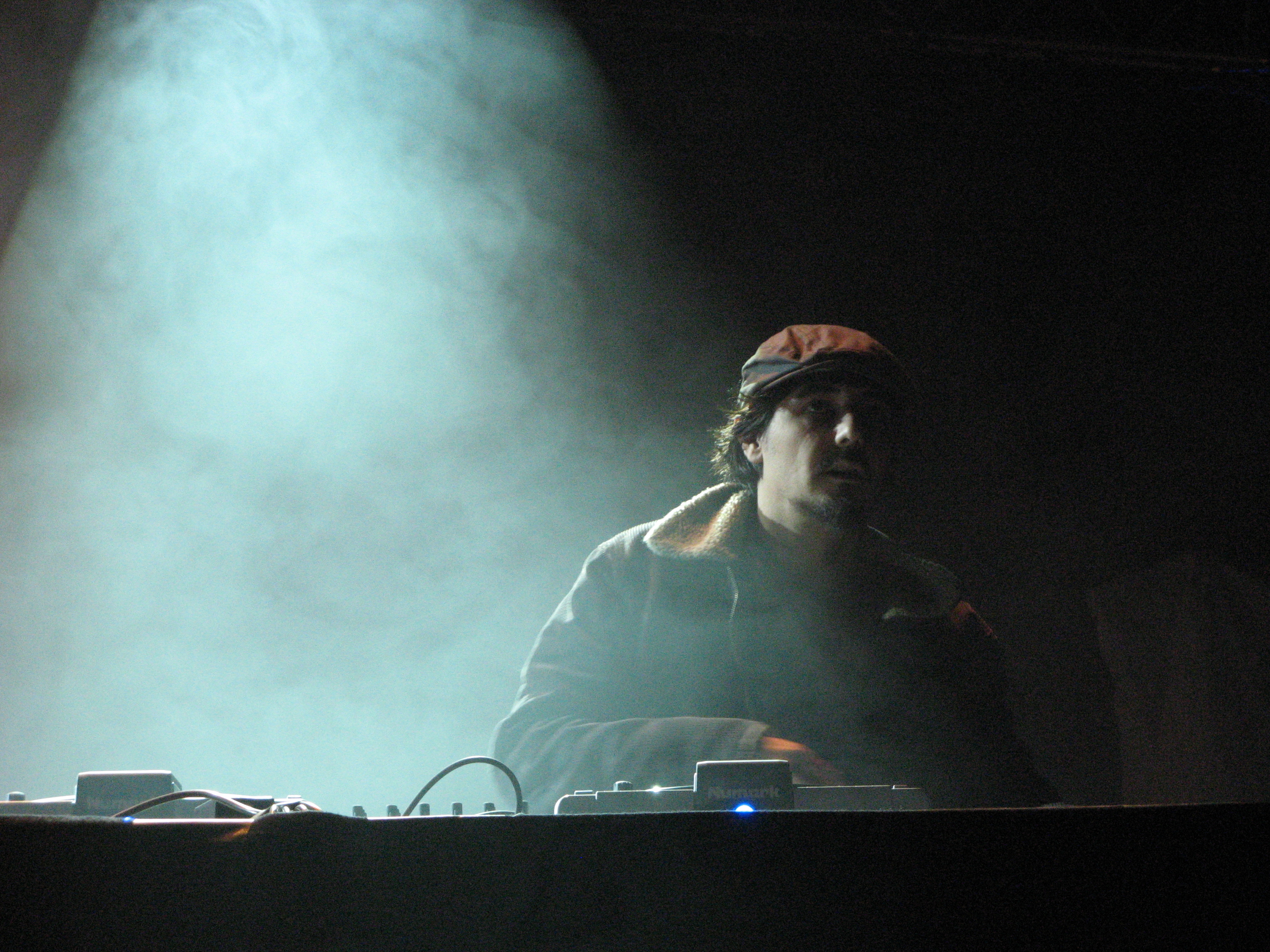
- Tobin performing live in Luxembourg City in 2007

Background information
- Also known as: Cujo; Two Fingers; Only Child Tyrant; Figueroa; Stone Giants
- Born: Amon Adonai Santos de Araújo Tobin; February 7, 1972 (age 54); Rio de Janeiro, Brazil
- Genres: Electronic; IDM; nu jazz; trip hop; drum and bass; musique concrète; experimental
- Occupations: Record producer; musician; DJ
- Instruments: Synthesizers; keyboards; guitar; bass guitar; drums; drum machine; sampler; saxophone; theremin; chapman stick
- Years active: 1995–present
- Labels: Nomark; Ninja Tune; Ninebar
- Website: amontobin.com

Amon Adonai Santos de Araújo Tobin (/ˈɑːmɒn ˈtoʊbɪn/; born February 7, 1972) is a Brazilian electronic musician, composer and producer. He is noted for his unusual methodology in sound design and music production. He has released eight major studio albums under the London-based Ninja Tune record label. He has also released two albums under the alias Two Fingers with collaborator Doubleclick. His latest release, Nomark Selects V.2, was released on June 20, 2025.

His music has been used in numerous major motion pictures including The Italian Job and 21. Tobin has created songs for several independent films, including the 2006 Hungarian film Taxidermia, and had his music used in other independent films, including the 2002 Cannes Palme d'Or–nominated Divine Intervention. A selection of his tracks was featured in commercial bumps on Toonami and in the 2005 anime IGPX, and he produced the musical scores to critically acclaimed video games Tom Clancy's Splinter Cell: Chaos Theory by Ubisoft in 2005, and Sucker Punch's Infamous in 2009.

== Biography ==
=== Early career (1995–1997) ===
Tobin was born in Rio de Janeiro, Brazil. At the age of 2, he and his family left Brazil to live in Morocco, the Netherlands, London, Portugal and Madeira. Tobin settled in Brighton, England as a teenager, which remained his permanent residence until 2002. There he began producing electronic music in his bedroom with samplers and other audio equipment including an Amstrad Studio 100 4-track, although he was "not really involved in the [music] scene" at that time. While taking an editorial photography class at a university in Brighton, he responded to a magazine promotion for the London-based Ninebar record label asking artists to send in demos of their songs. Ninebar signed Tobin to the label in 1996 after hearing his early work, and he traveled between his home in Brighton and the studios in London to produce his first official works.

Under his original moniker Cujo (after the Stephen King novel of the same name), he released a series of original compositions on 12-inch vinyl. AllMusic called them "head-turning" in a review. Many of those tracks were later included on his first full-length album Adventures in Foam, originally released in 1996 by Ninebar to a limited release of 5,000 copies.

The larger Ninja Tune record label had been growing in the United Kingdom at the time with help from artists DJ Food, Funki Porcini, The Herbaliser, and Coldcut. DJ Food and Funki Porcini noticed Tobin's work on Adventures in Foam and prompted the label to approach him. Ninja Tune signed Tobin in late 1996, this time under his abbreviated name "Amon Tobin". The official Ninja Tune website has said that Adventures in Foam had been re-released without permission by the US-based Shadow Records that same year and that this unauthorized version, labeled the "US release", included only 7 of the original songs, different cover art, and that some tracks were titled incorrectly. In 1997 Ninja Tune acquired the proper licenses from Ninebar and re-released the album themselves. This version included the original album in its entirety, and a second disc containing previously unreleased material. As of 2008, copies of Shadow Record's "US version" are sold by online retailer Amazon.com. Over the course of its production, Adventures in Foam has been reviewed favorably. Ryan Schreiber of Pitchfork Media said that its break-beat style "got totally out of hand", but that it "never fails to let the listener know who's in charge." The album was released for a fourth time in 2002, again by Ninja Tune.

=== Bricolage, Permutation and Supermodified (1997–2002) ===
Amon Tobin "Sordid" (1998)
"Sordid" by Amon Tobin, from the album Permutation

Over the next several years, Tobin released three albums. Bricolage, released in 1997, was the culmination of two projects Tobin had started after his debut album earlier that year. His third album Permutation was released in 1998. In the late 1990s, sample-based music was becoming more popular with a wide range of emerging and developing genres, but Tobin himself was still largely unknown. Tobin's style of music was not seen as definitively belonging to one genre or another. The critics that commented on Bricolage and Permutation gave them positive reviews and they are often mentioned, by later reviewers and interviewers, as classic albums of the time. Pitchfork acclaimed the use of jazz instrument samples, comparing him to famous composers Quincy Jones and Miles Davis. In a 1999 review, they awarded Bricolage a very rare 10/10 and said that it was "one of the most inventive records of the decade."

Tobin released his fourth album, Supermodified in 2000. The album is regarded as his most commercial album to date. Critic reviews were generally positive, with Pitchfork rating the album 9.1/10, and Stylus Magazine saying, "Not many studio-bound electronic musicians could put forward such a vivid and dynamic statement or make it as entertaining and downright funky as Supermodified has managed to do."

=== Out From Out Where, Chaos Theory and Foley Room (2002–2008) ===
Amon Tobin "Back From Space" (2002)
"Back From Space" by Amon Tobin, from the album Out From Out Where

In 2002, Tobin relocated to Montreal, Quebec, Canada where he had spent time previously at Ninja Tune's North American Headquarters. Tobin lived in the industrial area of Old Montreal to avoid noise complaints from neighbors after dark. There he produced his fifth album Out From Out Where released that same year. This was his first album created primarily in a professional studio. He later released a single, Verbal, taken from Out From Out Where. Otis Hart of Dusted Magazine said that Tobin's style of producing had come into its own. He acclaimed Tobin's "refined sense of tempo".

In January 2004, Tobin was contracted by video game company Ubisoft Montreal to compose the soundtrack for the third installment of their critically successful Tom Clancy's Splinter Cell series, Tom Clancy's Splinter Cell: Chaos Theory. To facilitate using the music in a video game, where the level of action or plot can change in real-time, each track was broken down by Tobin into four distinct but similar parts based on their level of intensity. The game's developers could then use each section to provide music based on the actions of the player. Despite not being an official album in Tobin's discography, it was considered a groundbreaking work in the world of video game sound tracks described as "an entirely new era of media" by Tiny Mix Tapes.

The album continued the trend Tobin started with Out From Out Where, as he used more field recordings during production. In addition to being included with the game, Ninja Tune released the score as an individual album in 2005, titled Chaos Theory – Splinter Cell 3 Soundtrack, several months before the game's release. It was received well, benefiting from a wider audience of reviewers in both the music and gaming industries. Ben Hogwood of MusicOMH.com applauded Tobin's use of melody and texture, adding that he controlled the sounds with the "clarity of a classical orchestrator." He later recorded a Dolby Digital 5.1 surround sound version of the album with audio engineer Bobby Azinsky in a dedicated Solid State Logic studio in Los Angeles.

Tobin's sixth studio album, Foley Room, was released in 2007. The title alludes to the "Foley rooms" used by recording engineers and Foley artists to record sound effects in the movie industry. On this album, Tobin concluded his transition away from prerecorded source material that started with Out From Out Where. All of the samples used for production were recorded by himself using an omnidirectional microphone. Recorded primarily in Montreal, San Francisco, and Seattle, the samples came from a wide range of sources including motorbikes, tigers, insects, and water falling from a tap. Also contributing to the album were the string quartet Kronos Quartet, drummer Stefan Schneider, and harpist Sarah Pagé. Foley Room's use of field-recordings was used to help promote the album, including two official pre-release trailers posted to YouTube. Nate Dorr of PopMatters.com called it a "smooth, natural progression" from his work on Supermodified. The first single, "Bloodstone", was released to the iTunes Music Store months before the rest of the album. Ninja Tune also published a DVD titled Foley Room: Found Footage which documented the recording process.

=== ISAM and Two Fingers (2009–2018) ===
In 2006, Tobin began collaborating on a hip-hop oriented project with British drum-and-bass producer Doubleclick and a number of guest vocalists. As Two Fingers, the pair have released several singles, followed by their self-titled debut album in 2009. The eponymous release came out in 2009 on Paper Bag Records in North America and Big Dada in the United Kingdom. The two producers, who first met when Tobin was living in Brighton, U.K., got together in Montreal in 2007 over a series of tracks that were partially an extension of their previous collaborations — exemplified by the dense, pummeling 2003 track "Ownage" — but in general, a fundamentally new and dynamic direction incorporating visceral elements of dancehall, dubstep, and grime. Following the singles "That Girl" and "What You Know," the group's self-titled debut was released in spring 2009, featuring vocals from dancehall star Ce'Cile, Ms. Jade, and, on seven of the album's 12 tracks, British rapper Sway. In 2009, Tobin also collaborated with the UK drum-and-bass artist Dom & Roland on a track titled “Sylo” for the album No Strings Attached.

In 2008, Tobin announced he was working on a new video game soundtrack for an "undisclosed PS3 title". This was later revealed to be the PlayStation 3 exclusive game, inFamous, and in 2010, Tobin announced that he would be working on the music for Tom Clancy's Splinter Cell: Conviction. Recent works include "Hey Mr. Tree" as a 'Bonus Joint' to accompany his earlier 'Monthly Joint' collection, a remix of Noisia's "Machine Gun" released alongside remixes by 16 Bit and Spor, and a collaboration with ESKMO dubbed Eskamon. Eskamon has released a single "Fine Objects".

In January 2011, his artist page was updated on Ninja Tune website, announcing a new album entitled ISAM, as well as a Splinter Cell: Chaos Theory remix album. After being leaked by a journalist, ISAM was released on April 20, 2011. As its extension, in May 2012, Tobin released the Boxset, prominent of its form of a mechanical press. As a set of 15 different physical carriers, it contains remixes, cover versions and re-interpretations of tracks from ISAM, along with Tobin's earliest audio experiments, film and television scores, as well as deleted bootlegs.

The second album under Two Fingers, Stunt Rhythms, was a solo effort by Amon Tobin and was designed by Inventory Studio and released worldwide by Big Dada Recordings in 2012.

On April 18, 2015, Amon Tobin announced Dark Jovian, an EP, and his first release under his name in four years.

=== Nomark Records and new aliases (2019–present) ===
In February 2019, Amon Tobin's website announced a new album, Fear in a Handful of Dust, to be released in April 2019 on a new label, Nomark Records. The album's release on April 26, 2019, marked the end of an 8 year long hiatus in new studio LP album releases under Tobin's name (his previous release being ISAM in 2011). Throughout the remainder of 2019, Tobin would also release three singles under his Two Fingers alias: You Ain't Down, 296 Rhythm, and LED Moon Rhythm. On July 26, 2019, Tobin released the album Time to Run under a new alias known as Only Child Tyrant.

In September 2019, Tobin announced the Nomark Club, an annual subscription service that grants access to all of Tobin's material as it is released, including some member-exclusive content (the material is delivered via Bandcamp's subscription service). A supporter-exclusive extended play album titled Fine Strips of Violence was released in tandem with the announcement. Long Stories, which arrived October 2019, was made in parallel with Fear in a Handful of Dust and features prominent use of a broken Omnichord. In December 2019, Tobin released a two-track Nomark Club-exclusive album titled Nine Bars Back under the alias of Cujo—one that had not been used since the release of Adventures in Foam in 1996.

Tobin released The World As We Know It in July 2020 under the alias Figueroa, which marked a departure in Tobin's usual instrumental style, as it was his first major release to feature prominent vocal work. The album's lyrics were performed by Tobin himself with technical guidance from producer Sylvia Massy. Tobin describes the lyrics as being rather ambiguous, stating in an interview that "I want the feeling of the songs to be the priority, rather than the specific meaning." West Coast Love Stories, the debut album by new alias Stone Giants, "celebrates the relationship between voice and machine from an altogether different perspective - humans and electronics pooling resources to explore themes of love and being none the wiser for it."

The "cinematic and apocalyptic" How Do You Live, released under Tobin's name, arrived in September 2021. In February 2021, Tobin was announced to be involved in the soundtracking of the Meow Wolf Omega Mart installation, along with Beach House, Brian Eno, Santigold, and others. Tobin's soundtrack to the installation, A Living Room (Music from Meow Wolf's Omega Mart) was released on September 23, 2022, on his Nomark Records label as a single-sided vinyl record with an etching on the reverse. As Two Fingers, a trio of collaborative singles with the German producer Muadeep came out in 2022: Blood Moon, Banished, and Lost Gods, leading to the trio's album Cronos. Also in 2022, the Only Child Tyrant alias released a pair of singles: HoneyCup Troll and Make Better Friends. The Nomark Records label released the Nomark Selects V.1 compilation album in 2023, and the Nomark Selects V.2 compilation album in 2025, both containing singles hand-picked by the Nomark Club members.

== Musical style and influences ==
Tobin is best known for his use of audio manipulation techniques, where any given source material is transformed to produce a new sound. His use of this technique has changed over the course of his career. On his original singles under Ninebar and his first three albums, Tobin acquired all of the sound sources to produce music from his personal collection of vinyl records. He manipulates the sounds with a combination of audio hardware and software including Cubase, often leaving the original source unrecognizable in its new context. The majority of his early work focused on reordering the break beats from jazz and blues music into faster more complex patterns. Guido Farnell of InTheMix.com, wrote about his use of this technique, saying that Tobin has "taken the art to new and dizzying heights."

His fifth album Out From Out Where began the gradual shift away from prerecorded material by incorporating original guitar samples. His techniques began branching into technical sound design, taking break beats or single instruments, modifying specific frequencies, and producing new sounds. This trend continued through his video game score Tom Clancy's Splinter Cell: Chaos Theory Soundtrack, and by his sixth album, Foley Room, all of the source material was recorded in the field by himself. Speaking about the creativity of sample-based music compared to traditional instruments, he says that "creative input is not determined by your source material but in how you edit and manipulate the sounds."

Tobin experimented with various instruments. He does not come from a music family, nor has he had any formal training in music theory. About his music in general, Tobin says that he sees it as a "genuine" expression of the time he lives in, as he says that by contrast, blues, jazz, and Brazilian genres were "genuine" expressions of the 1960s.

Despite his indirect connection with Brazilian genres, Tobin collaborated with a number of artists on Bebel Gilberto's 2000 bossa nova album Tanto Tempo. Tobin's albums are often compared to soundtracks, and he says that movies by David Lynch have influenced him. In addition, he has stated to like films by the Coen brothers, Dario Argento, and Roman Polanski.

== Live performances ==
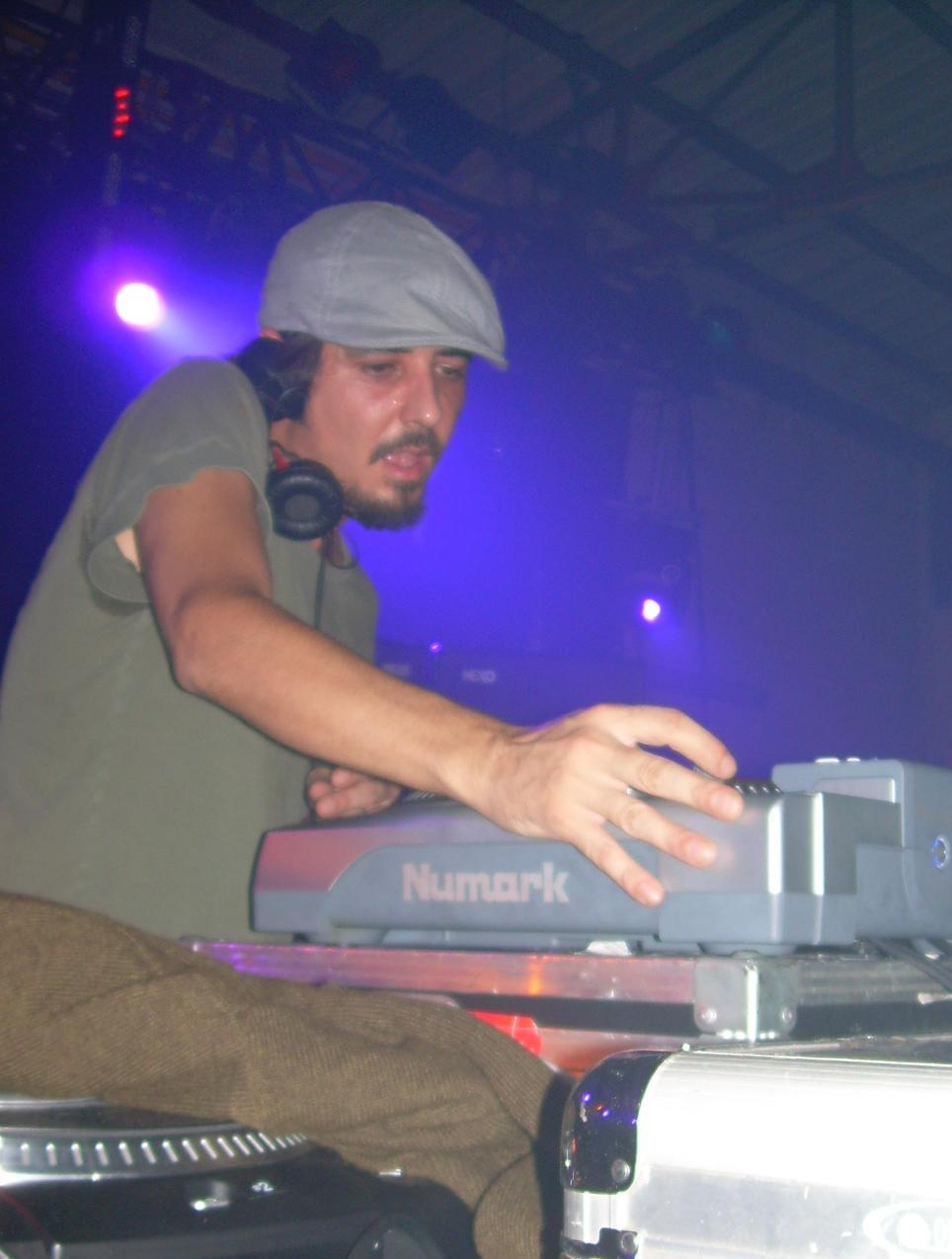
Tobin performing at l'Ososphère music festival in Strasbourg

Tobin began performing live shows in clubs with other Ninja Tune artists after releasing his second album, Bricolage. His shows generally contained music that he had produced during his career, mixed with modified songs from drum and bass, hip-hop, or other genres. Because his music was entirely produced in a studio with electronics, Tobin was not interested in adapting his music to suit a Live PA incorporating musicians. He instead used turntables which he felt had more in common with his approach to music production. He is known for building Dolby Digital 7.1 surround sound speaker systems for his performances.

In 2011, Tobin developed a live show in support of the album ISAM, fitting his criteria for a performance that is both live and purely electronic. He told Wired Magazine "The idea was to integrate myself, quite literally, into an audio and visual presentation of the album,". It incorporates the use of new video mapping techniques that are projected onto a large cubic structure from which Tobin performs. The show has been met with international acclaim; Vice Magazine's Creators Project described it as "revolutionizing the live music experience".

Tobin has performed individual shows in many countries including tours in Europe, Australia, Japan, and the United States. His 2003 live performance in Melbourne, Australia was used for the fourth album in Ninja Tune's Solid Steel series because Tobin was not available to record a studio mix at the time. Many songs from the original recording were omitted because of copyright issues with the original artists, including the R&B group Destiny's Child.

A second Solid Steel album Foley Room Recorded Live in Brussels was recorded in Brussels at the Ancienne Belgique in 2007, and was released for free in November 2008. According to Tobin's official website, "After months of back and forth and despite everyone's best efforts the mix was in danger of being edited into the ground to accommodate big labels and publishers. Rather than release a compromised version commercially, the decision was made to give it away for free instead."

== Film work and soundtracks ==
Amon Tobin's sounds and samples are frequently used in the British car-based TV show Top Gear, and his song "Four Ton Mantis" has been used in advertisements for Nissan Qashqai and Juke. Tobin's music also appeared in several major motion pictures including The Italian Job, Tideline (Littoral) and 21. He has also produced tracks for a number of independent films, including The Last Minute, and has created production music for the BMG Zomba commercial library which is used in various films. In 2006, he scored the soundtrack for the Hungarian horror film Taxidermia which was made available on his website. He also produced the score for the 2009 documentary Pax Americana and the Weaponization of Space.

In April 2010, Tobin composed and produced a small body of work for the video game Tom Clancy's Splinter Cell: Conviction which was available for streaming on his website. In 2013, Two Fingers composed the theme music for the BBC America/Space original series Orphan Black.

== Discography ==
Tobin has released seventeen major studio albums under his name and various aliases.

as Cujo
- Adventures in Foam (1996)

as Amon Tobin

- Bricolage (1997)
- Permutation (1998)
- Supermodified (2000)
- Out from Out Where (2002)
- Chaos Theory (2005)
- Foley Room (2007)
- ISAM (2011)
- Fear in a Handful of Dust (2019)
- Long Stories (2019)
- How Do You Live (2021)
as Two Fingers
- Two Fingers (2009)
- Stunt Rhythms (2012)
- Fight! Fight! Fight! (2020)
- Cronos (2023) (with Muadeep)

as Only Child Tyrant

- Time to Run (2019)

as Figueroa

- The World As We Know It (2020)

as Stone Giants

- West Coast Love Stories (2021)

Since 2019, Tobin has been releasing music through an online subscription service Nomark Club based on Bandcamp. Current releases, eventually compiled into yearly Volumes, include exclusive tracks, short films, sample packs, and studio production videos. As of 2024, Nomark Club's major releases have included albums from Tobin himself and his monikers, as well as collaborations with G Jones, Ivy Lab, Little Snake, Thys, and Muadeep.
