= Imanu =

Dutch electronic musician

- Also known as: Signal
- Born: Jonathan Immanuel Kievit; 14 November 1998 (age 27); Saint-Denis, Réunion, France
- Origin: Rotterdam, Netherlands
- Labels: UKF Music, Critical Music, Deadbeats, Vision Recordings, Dividid, Shogun Audio
- Website: imanu.nu

Jonathan Immanuel Kievit (born 14 November 1998), known professionally as Imanu (stylized as IMANU), formerly as Signal is a Dutch-Surinamese DJ, record producer and musician born in Saint-Denis, Réunion.

== Career ==
After being exposed to trance and progressive house by a friend at the age of 10, Kievit started producing house at the age of 14. A few years later he discovered the music by Dutch trio Noisia and subsequently started producing drum and bass. Eventually, Dutch drum and bass artist Fre4knc also sent a song by Kievit to Noisia, who then signed him under the alias Signal to their label Invisible Recordings when Kievit was only 16 years old. In 2018 Kievit co-founded the record label Dividid (stylized as DIVIDID) with Mark McCann, known as Abis and Rotterdam-based promoter Lars Dingeman.

In 2019 Kievit started a new project under the alias "Imanu", which has since been active. As Imanu he pushed the boundaries of drum and bass as a genre and explored other genres, such as house, techno and footwork. He described his style of music as "future breaks" and cited Flume as his primary influence besides Sophie, Cashmere Cat and Arca.

Since starting with Imanu, Kievit has released music on significant electronic music labels such as Zeds Dead's Deadbeats, Vision Recordings, and UKF Music and has collaborated with Noisia, What So Not, Kučka, Josh Pan and Pham.

In 2021, Beatport named Kievit as one of six Beatport NEXT artists, supporting him for a full year by offering store featurings, playisting, editorial features, live-streams and social media support. In the same year, Kievit performed a 1-hour mix with UKF on BBC Radio 1.

In June 2022, Kievit announced his debut album Unfold, which was released on September 16, 2022, through Deadbeats. In April 2023, a remix compilation album titled Unfold Remixes was released, featuring remixes from artists such as Zeds Dead, Machinedrum, What So Not and others.

== Discography ==
Sourced from Apple Music.

=== As IMANU ===
==== Albums ====
| Title | Details |
|---|---|
| Unfold | Released: September 16, 2022; Label: Deadbeats; Formats: LP, digital download, streaming |

==== EPs ====
| Title | Details |
|---|---|
| Ego | Released: October 13, 2019; Label: Vision Recordings; Formats: EP, digital download, streaming |
| Memento | Released: May 29, 2020; Label: Vision; Formats: Digital download, streaming |
| Cheren | Released: September 11, 2020; Label: Vision; Formats: Digital download, streaming |
| Re: Imanu | Released: December 18, 2020; Label: Vision; Formats: Digital download, streaming |
| Neiges / La Fournaise (with The Caracal Project) | Released: January 4, 2022; Label: Critical Music; Formats: Digital download, streaming |
| A Taste of Hope (Remixes) | Released: February 24, 2022; Label: UKF; Formats: Digital download, streaming |
| Unfold Remixes | Released: April 14, 2023; Label: Deadbeats; Formats: Digital download, streaming |
| Paradise | Released: October 20, 2023; Label: Deadbeats; Formats: Digital download, streaming |
| Entangled | Released: May 2, 2025; Label: Deadbeats; Formats: Digital download, streaming |

==== Singles ====
As lead artist

| Title | Year | Album | Label |
|---|---|---|---|
| "Technoid" (with Halogenix) | 2020 | Non-album singles | Critical Music |
| "Bloom" | 2020 | Memento | Vision |
| "Nagow" (with Buunshin) | 2020 | Cheren | Vision |
| "Fuji" | 2020 | Non-album single | Self-released |
| "A Taste of Hope" | 2021 | A Taste of Hope (Remixes) | UKF |
| "Skin To Skin" | 2021 | Heaven Sent: Volume 1 | Heaven Sent |
| "A Taste of Hope (Hallowvale)" | 2021 | A Taste of Hope (Remixes) | UKF |
| "Buried" (with Hypression) | 2021 | Non-album singles | Deadbeats |
| "Gaspin 4 Air" (with The Caracal Project and Leotrix) | 2021 | Non-album singles | UKF |
| "Kotaro" (with Jon Casey) | 2022 | Non-album singles | Sable Valley Records |
| "It's Our Destiny" (with Kučka) | 2022 | Unfold | Deadbeats |
| "Somehow We Lost It All" (with Pham and Josh Pan) | 2022 | Unfold | Deadbeats |
| "Temper" (with Lia Kuri) | 2022 | Unfold | Deadbeats |
| "Pillow Talk" (with Wingtip and What So Not) | 2022 | Unfold | Deadbeats |
| "Empress" | 2022 | Unfold | Deadbeats |
| "Catalyst" (with Droeloe) | 2023 | Non-album singles | UKF |
| "Empress" (Phace x Imanu VIP) | 2023 | Unfold Remixes | Deadbeats |
| "Outlaw" (featuring Flowdan) | 2023 | Non-album singles | Monta Records |
| "Of Two Minds" (with Rhode) | 2023 | Paradise | Deadbeats |
| "Dream Sequence" (with The Glitch Mob) | 2023 | Paradise | Deadbeats |
| "Aching (On A High)" (with Lia Kuri) | 2023 | Paradise | Deadbeats |
| "Rush" (with Zeds Dead) | 2023 | Paradise | Deadbeats |
| "It's Our Destiny" (with Kučka) (Imanu Remix) | 2024 | Deadbeats & Brownies - Drum & Bass Compilation | Deadbeats / Brownies & Lemonade |
| "Reminiscing" (with Indi) | 2024 | Non-album singles | UKF |
| "Fire" (with Grabbitz) | 2024 | Non-album singles | Deadbeats |
| "Celeste" | 2024 | Non-album singles | Altered States |
| "All Too Late" (with Rhode) | 2025 | Entangled | Deadbeats |
| "Hush" (with Kroy) | 2025 | Entangled | Deadbeats |
| "It Doesn't Matter" (with Emilia Ali) | 2025 | Entangled | Deadbeats |
| "Sutekh" (with YMIR) | 2025 | Non-album singles | Majestic Collective |
| "Bleak" (with A Girl Named Sue) | 2025 | Non-album singles | Deadbeats |
| "Falling Apart" | 2025 | Non-album singles | Deadbeats |
| "Runaway" (with Zeds Dead and MKLA) | 2026 | Non-album singles | Deadbeats |
| "Heaven Knows What" (with Stabbed by Angels) | 2026 | Non-album singles | Majestic Collective |
| "All U Need" (with A Girl Named Sue) | 2026 | Non-album singles | UKF |

As featured artist

| Title | Year | Album | Label |
|---|---|---|---|
| "Overwerk" (with Buunshin) | 2019 | We Are Friends, Vol. 9 | Mau5trap |
| "Transit" (with Mefjus) | 2020 | Particles | Vision |
| "Parallels" (with Black Sun Empire) | 2020 | Lifecycle: Creation | Blackout Music NL |
| "Preamble" (with Icicle) | 2020 | Mission 01 | Vision |
| "Glass Hearts" (with Sleepnet) | 2021 | First Light | Vision |
| "Life Suck" (with Must Die!) | 2021 | Crisis Vision | Never Say Die Records |
| "Shift" (with Noisia) | 2022 | Closer | Vision |
| "Libre" (with Habstrakt) | 2023 | Heritage | Distorted Reality |
| "You Left Me Hanging." (with The Caracal Project) | 2024 | Self Reflections: | Self-released |
| "Slow Motion" (with What So Not and MNDR) | 2024 | Motions | Create Music Group |
| "For Her (Chemtrails)" (with Tanerélle and Machinedrum) | 2024 | Electric Honey (Encore) | Republic Records |

As remixed artist

| Title | Year | Album | Label |
|---|---|---|---|
| "Empress" (Zeds Dead Remix) | 2023 | Unfold Remixes | Deadbeats |
| "Haunt My Mind" (featuring Tudor) (Machinedrum Remix) | 2023 | Unfold Remixes | Deadbeats |
| "It's Our Destiny" (with Kučka) (Nitepunk Remix) | 2023 | Unfold Remixes | Deadbeats |

==== Remixes ====
Official remixes

| Title | Year | Artist | Label |
|---|---|---|---|
| "Berry Patch" | 2020 | Machinedrum and Holly | Vision |
| "Love That Never" | 2020 | Tokimonsta | Young Art Records |
| "Obsession" | 2020 | RayRay and DJ Soda | Barong Family |
| "Got The Blood" | 2021 | Yultron and Shybeast | Hopeless Records |
| "I'm Fine" (feat. High Klassified and Cherry Lena) | 2021 | Apashe | Kannibalen Records |
| "I Think You're Cool" (feat. Jenna Pemkowski) (Imanu x Quiet Bison Remix) | 2021 | Zeds Dead | Altered States |
| "Incessant" | 2021 | Noisia | Vision |
| "Shadow" (feat. Calivania) | 2022 | Boombox Cartel and Moody Good | Monta Records |
| "All The Highs" | 2022 | San Holo | Helix Records |
| "Gassed Up" (feat. Zeds Dead and Flowdan) | 2022 | Subtronics | Cyclops Recordings |
| "Lost In Mumbai" (feat. Geoffroy) | 2024 | Apashe | Kannibalen Records |
| "Loon Moon" | 2025 | Lia Kuri | Friends Of Friends |

Unofficial remixes

| Title | Year | Artist |
|---|---|---|
| "Jack" (Imanu & Buunshin Edit) | 2020 | Breach |
| "Formula" | 2020 | RL Grime and Juelz |
| "Star" | 2021 | Machinedrum, Tanerélle and Mono/Poly |

=== As Signal ===
==== EPs ====
| Title | Details |
|---|---|
| Concept / You Don't Know | Released: February 9, 2015; Label: Ammunition Recordings; Formats: Digital download, streaming |
| Footprint / Dusk | Released: August 10, 2015; Label: Overtech Music; Formats: Digital download, streaming |
| Critical Presents: Binary Vol.7 | Released: August 31, 2015; Label: Critical Music; Formats: Digital download, streaming |
| Indirect / In Motion | Released: January 25, 2016; Label: Lifestyle Recordings; Formats: Digital download, streaming |
| Critical Presents: Systems 004 | Released: April 15, 2016; Label: Critical Music; Formats: EP, digital download, streaming |
| Parallax | Released: October 14, 2016; Label: Critical Music; Formats: Digital download, streaming |
| Indirect VIP / Indirect (Lockjaw Remix) | Released: December 23, 2016; Label: Lifestyle Recordings; Formats: EP, digital download, streaming |
| Mantura (with Disprove) | Released: October 6, 2017; Label: Invisible Recordings; Formats: Digital download, streaming |
| Consonance / Locust (with Phace) | Released: January 26, 2018; Label: NËU; Formats: Digital download, streaming |
| The Wall (with ABIS) | Released: March 5, 2018; Label: Dividid; Formats: Digital download, streaming |
| Doom Desire | Released: April 27, 2018; Label: Shogun Audio; Formats: Digital download, streaming |
| Torment / 2ME | Released: July 9, 2018; Label: Dividid; Formats: Digital download, streaming |
| Solitude | Released: November 9, 2018; Label: Invisible Recordings; Formats: Digital download, streaming |
| Exile / In Black (with Synergy) | Released: April 5, 2019; Label: Dividid; Formats: Digital download, streaming |

==== Singles ====
As lead artist

| Title | Year | Album | Label |
|---|---|---|---|
| "Doom Desire" | 2018 | Doom Desire | Shogun Audio |
| "How Will I Know" | 2018 | Doom Desire | Shogun Audio |

As featured artist

| Title | Year | Album | Label |
|---|---|---|---|
| "Arkaik Twelve" (with Disprove) | 2015 | Compound Two | Renegade Hardware |
| "Existence" | 2015 | Mind Technologies Vol. 5 | Mindtech Recordings |
| "Tripwire" | 2015 | Invisible 015 | Invisible Recordings |
| "Vollzeit" (with Lockjaw) | 2015 | RA011 | Rise Audio |
| "Seven" (with Mystic State) | 2016 | Demand Selects #1 | Demand Records |
| "Beneath The Surface" (with Mystic State) | 2016 | Art of Deception | Authentic Music |
| "Erger" (with Disprove) | 2016 | Invisible 019 | Invisible Recordings |
| "Ritual" (with Disprove and Audeka) | 2016 | MethLab, Vol. 2 | Bad Taste Recordings / MethLab |
| "Shapes" (with Arkaik) | 2016 | Shapes | Dispatch Recordings |
| "Barrier" (with Segment and Concept Vision) | 2016 | Barrier | Major League DnB |
| "Informer" (with Phentix) | 2016 | Pitch Black | Cyberfunk |
| "Objectify" | 2016 | Eurofunk Volume Two | Neodigital |
| "Unusual Behaviour" (with DLR) | 2016 | Dreamland | Dispatch Recordings |
| "Omega Point VIP" (with Allied and Heamy) | 2016 | Binary : Codes | Critical Music |
| "Stealth Ops" (with Current Value) | 2016 | Critical Presents: Systems 006 | Critical Music |
| "Illusion" (with Cruk) | 2017 | Invisible 026 | Invisible Recordings |
| "Periphery" | 2017 | Critical Music Presents: 15 Years of Underground Sonics | Critical Music |
| "Funky Feeling" (with Teddy Killerz) | 2017 | RAM Goes to Let It Roll 2.0 | RAM Records |
| "Hydraulic" (with Culprate) | 2017 | Unity Project, Pt. 2 | Open Outlets |
| "Aversion" (with Fourward) | 2018 | Wölfe | Eatbrain |
| "Make Me Feel" (with Hyroglifics) | 2018 | South London's Finest | Critical Music |
| "Angst" (with Disprove and ABIS) | 2018 | Angst / In Time | Dividid |
| "Tatsu" (with Oolacile) | 2018 | Non-album single | Havel |
| "All You Got" (with Synergy) | 2018 | The Abyss | Eatbrain |
| "Black Nazareth" (with Billain) | 2018 | Extraction | Bad Taste Recordings |
| "Triage" (with Culprate and Disprove) | 2019 | Rampage Sampler 05 | Rampage Recordings |
| "Artworld" (with ABIS and DLR) | 2019 | Artworld | Sofa Sound |
| "Human Behaviour VIP" (with DLR) | 2022 | The Variance in Production EP | Dispatch Recordings |

As remixed artist

| Title | Year | Album | Label |
|---|---|---|---|
| "The Wall" (with ABIS and Tasha Baxter) (Buunshin Remix) | 2019 | The Wall (Buunshin Remix) / If U (Synergy Remix) | Dividid |
| "Locust" (with Phace) (Current Value Remix) | 2023 | Nëu V, Pt. 2 | NËU |

==== Remixes ====
Official remixes

| Title | Year | Artist | Label |
|---|---|---|---|
| "Just One Look" (feat. Charli Brix) | 2016 | Enei | Critical Music |
| "Black or White" (feat. Tasha Baxter) | 2017 | Camo & Krooked | RAM Records |
| "Listen" (feat. Catching Cairo) | 2017 | Hybrid Minds | Hybrid Music |
| "Rollcage" | 2018 | Blu Mar Ten | Blu Mar Ten Music |
| "Alarm" | 2018 | Lookas and Krewella | Monstercat |
| "Fall" | 2018 | Amba Shepherd | Beat Music Fund |
| "24/7" (feat. Feed Me) | 2018 | Foreign Beggars | Par Excellence |
| "Goh" (feat. KLP) | 2018 | What So Not and Skrillex | Sweat It Out |
| "Dies Irae" (feat. Black Prez) | 2018 | Apashe | Kannibalen Records |
| "Together" | 2018 | Mefjus | Vision Recordings |
| "Step by Step" (feat. Iris Penning) | 2018 | Droeloe | Bitbird |
| "Progression" (Synergy & Signal Remix) | 2019 | Phace and Misanthrop | Neosignal |
