= Pirate Station =

Russian drum and bass music festival

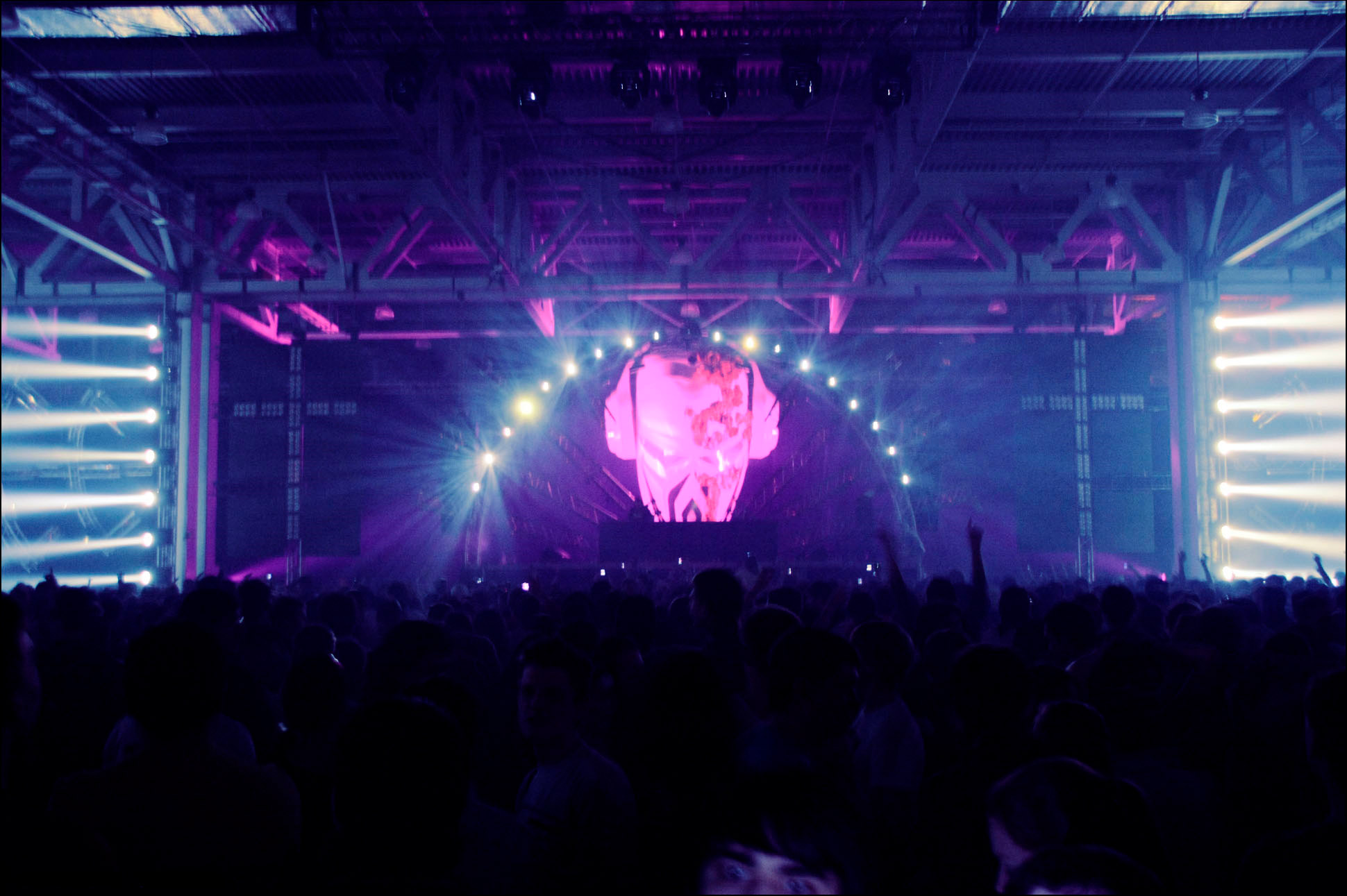
- Moscow in 2009
- Genre: Drum and bass
- Locations: Russian cities (Saint-Petersburg, Moscow, Ekaterinburg, Novosibirsk, Samara etc.), Estonia, Ukraine, Belarus
- Years active: 2003–present
- Website: Homepage

Pirate Station (Russian: Пиратская станция) is a drum and bass music festival, described as the world's biggest. It's held every year since 2003, when St. Petersburg held the first event. It has spread to the biggest Russian cities (Moscow, Ekaterinburg, Novosibirsk, Samara etc.) and has also taken place in Estonia and Ukraine, which makes Pirate Station the biggest Russian dance project ever. Almost half a million people visited the festival during these years. The main St. Petersburg show hosts more than 25,000 fans annually. Pirate Station is not just about music – it is a mix of unique performances and special effects united by a concept which changes every year.

== Venues ==
=== Saint-Petersburg ===
- SKK Peterburgsky (Capacity: 25000 people) - Years hosted: 2007–2014
- Yubileyny Sports Palace (Capacity: 15000 people) - Years hosted: 2003–2006, 2015, 2017
- A2 Club (Capacity: 5000 people) - Years hosted: 2016

=== Moscow ===
- Tuning Hall Club (Capacity: 4800 people) - Years hosted: 2008
- Crocus Expo (Capacity: 15000 people) - Years hosted: 2009
- LFC CSKA (Capacity: ~10000 people) - Years hosted: 2010,2011
- Stadium Live Club (Capacity: 8000 people) - Years hosted: 2012–2016

== Lineups ==
Lineups are different in all cities. These are only some of the artists.

=== 2016 ===
CIRCUS

Saint-Petersburg (A2 Green Concert)

1st day:

- Andy C
- Delta Heavy
- Misanthrop
- Feint
- Gancher & Ruin
- MC Coppa
- Gvozd

2nd day:

- Sigma
- Prolix
- Emperor
- Teddy Killerz
- Enei
- The Outside Agency
- John B

Plus one more stage with local DNB-artists named "Gvozd & Friends"

Moscow (Stadium Live)

- Pendulum
- John B
- Culture Shock
- Counterstrike
- Pythius
- Lady Waks (With Special DNB Set)
- Paperclip
- Gvozd

=== 2015 ===
LOVE

Saint-Petersburg (SP Yubileyny)

- Optiv & BTK
- Gvozd
- Mefjus
- Bad Company
- Gancher & Ruin
- Pendulum
- Original Sin

Moscow (Stadium Live)

- Spor
- Rene Lavice
- Ed Rush
- Dillinja
- Sinister Souls
- Gvozd
- Smooth

=== 2014 ===
INFERNO

Saint-Petersburg (SKK Peterburgsky)

- Logistics & Nu:Tone (Nu:Logic)
- Black Sun Empire
- Andy C
- Noisia
- Enei
- Gvozd
- MC Tali
- Forbidden Society

Moscow (Stadium Live)

- Enei
- Mind Vortex
- Netsky
- Script MC
- Metrik
- Gvozd
- Fourward
- Evol Intent

=== 2013 ===
REVOLUTION

- Tantrum Desire
- Netsky (DJ set)
- Friction
- John B (DJ set)
- Pendulum (DJ set)
- Neonlight
- Gvozd
- The Qemists (Soundsystem set)
- Zardonic

=== 2012 ===
APOCALYPSE

- Dirtyphonics (LIVE)
- Noisia
- John B
- Brookes Brothers (DJ set)
- Technical Itch
- Blokhe4d (DJ set)
- Gvozd

=== 2011 ===
TEATRO

- Dirtyphonics (LIVE)
- Aphrodite
- John B
- Chase & Status (DJ set)
- Spor
- Current Value
- Ed Rush
- MC Rage
- Tapolsky
- Gvozd

=== 2010 ===
NETWORK

- Pendulum
- Sub Focus
- Noisia
- Goldie
- Break
- Lomax
- MC Verse
- SP:MC

=== 2009 ===
IMMORTAL

- Aphrodite
- Noisia
- Pendulum
- Sub Focus
- John B
- DJ Hazard
- Spor
- Chase & Status
- MC Jakes

=== 2008 ===
FUTURE

- Goldie
- TC
- Kosheen
- Noisia
- Aphrodite
- Spor
- DJ Friction
- Sub Focus
- Dillinja
- Gvozd
- Toper

=== 2007 ===
- MC Tali
- Grooverider
- DJ Hype
- Dylan
- Dieselboy
- Goldie
- The Panacea
- Total Science
- MC Dynamite

=== 2006 ===
The 2006 Pirate Station IV was held in two arenas of the Yubileyny Palace of Sports, St. Petersburg.

- Pendulum
- DJ Hype
- Goldie
- Roni Size
- Adam F
- Bad Company
- Technical Itch
- Aphrodite

=== 2005 ===
- Goldie
- Grooverider
- Fabio
- MC Rage
- Pendulum
- MC Stirlin

=== 2004 ===
- Goldie
- LTJ Bukem & MC Conrad
- Bad Company

=== 2003 ===
- Goldie
- Technical Itch
- Aphrodite

== See also ==
- List of electronic music festivals
