= Camo & Krooked discography =

This is the discography of Austrian production duo Camo & Krooked.

== Albums ==
Year	Album	Peak chart positions
Year	Album	UK
2010	Above & Beyond: Release date: 12 February 2010; Label: Mainframe Recordings; Format: 12" LP, CD, digital download	—
2011	Cross the Line: Release date: 3 October 2011; Label: Hospital Records; Format: 12" LP, CD, digital download	140
2013	Zeitgeist: Release date: 30 September 2013; Label: Hospital Records; Format: 12" LP, CD, digital download	111
2017	Mosaik: Release Date: 23 June 2017; Label: Mosaik Musik, RAM Records, BMG; Format: 12" LP, CD, digital download	—
2020	Red Bull Symphonic: Release Date: 7 May 2020; Label: Hospital Records; Format: CD, digital download	—

== Remix albums ==
Year	Album	Peak chart positions
Year	Album	UK
2012	Between the Lines: Release Date: 19 March 2012; Label: Hospital Records; Format: CD, digital download	151
2018	Mosaik remixed: Release Date: 16 March 2018; Label: Mosaik; Format: CD, digital download	
2023	Zeitgeist Remixes (10 Year Anniversary): Release Date: 8 December 2023; Label: Hospital Records; Format: CD, digital download	

== EPs ==
Year	EP
2010	Edge of Mind EP: Release Date: 22 February 2010; Label: Beta Recordings; Format: 12" vinyl, digital download
2011	Pulse of Time EP: Release Date: 31 January 2011; Label: Viper Recordings; Format: 2 x 12" vinyl, digital download

== Singles ==
Year	Single	Peak chart positions				Album
Year	Single	AUT	BEL (Vl)	BEL (Wa)	UK	Album
2011	"All Fall Down" (featuring Shaz Sparks) / "Breezeblock"	—	—	—	196	Cross the Line
2011	"Make the Call / In the Future" (featuring TC / featuring Jenna G & Futurebound)	—	—	—	—	Cross the Line
2011	"Cross the Line" (featuring Ayah Marar)	—	85	—	—	Cross the Line
2011	"Watch It Burn" (featuring Ayah Marar)	—	—	—	—	Cross the Line
2013	"All Night"	72	—	—	—	Zeitgeist
2013	"Move Around" (featuring Ian Shaw)	—	—	—	—	Zeitgeist
2013	"Loving You is Easy"	—	60	66	—	Zeitgeist
2016	"If I Could / Ember" (featuring Joe Killington)	—	—	—	—	Mosaik
2017	"Good Times Bad Times / Honesty"	—	—	—	—	Mosaik
2017	"Mandala" (featuring Mefjus)	—	—	—	—	Mosaik
2017	"Like I Do" (featuring James Hersey)	—	—	—	—	Mosaik
2019	"Loa"	—	—	—	—	Non-album singles
2019	"Kallisto" (with Mefjus)	—	—	—	—	Non-album singles
2019	"Sidewinder" (with Mefjus)	—	—	—	—	Particles
2019	"Set It Off" (featuring Jeru the Damaja)	—	—	—	—	Non-album singles
2020	"No Tomorrow" (with Mefjus featuring Sophie Lindinger)	—	—	—	—	Non-album singles
2021	"Sientelo" (with Mefjus)	—	—	—	—	Non-album singles
2021	"U" (with Mefjus)	—	—	—	—	Non-album singles
2022	"Overture" (with Mefjus)	—	—	—	—	Non-album singles
2022	"Break Away" (with Mefjus)	—	—	—	—	Non-album singles
2022	"No Way Out" (featuring Mira Lu Kovacs)	—	—	—	—	Non-album singles
2023	"Nebula" (with Mefjus)	—	—	—	—	Non-album singles
2023	"It's Over"	—	—	—	—	Non-album singles
2023	"Swerve It" (with Bou and Mefjus featuring Mila Falls, P Money and D Double E)	—	—	—	—	Swerve It
2024	"Falling"	—	—	—	—	Non-album single
2024	"Pray For Me" (with Mefjus featuring Joe Killington)	—	—	—	—	Non-album single
2024	"Lies" (with Mefjus)	—	—	—	—	Non-album single
2025	"Lose Control" (with Wilkinson and Mefjus featuring Ilira)	—	—	—	—	TBA
"—" denotes single that did not chart or was not released.

== Other single releases ==
Year	Single	Label
2008	"Drop It" / "Play It" / "Hidden Edge" (Camo / Camo & Krooked / Camo featuring Nina)	Basswerk
2008	"Gangsta" / "Strength is Irrelevant" (Future Prophecies / Camo & Krooked)	Berzerk
2008	"Nasca" / "Change the Course" (Body & Soul / Body & Soul vs. Camo & Krooked)	Nasca
2008	"Feelings" / "Lost Out There" (Krooked & Rob.STP / Camo & Krooked)	Dirty Habit
2008	"Don't Push Me" / "No More Running" (Camo & Squash / Camo & Krooked)	Dirty Habit
2008	"It Has Begun" (b/w "Mafia" by Mutated Forms featuring MC Coppa)	Mainframe Recordings
2008	"Vision" (b/w "Flash To Flash" by Receptor)	Mainframe Recordings
2008	"You Don't Know What Love Is" (b/w "Fast Lane" by D-Fiancé)	Sudden Def Recordings
2008	"The Access" / "Close Ya Eyes"	Finn People Productions
2009	"Blackmail" / "No Nerds Needed" (Future Prophecies vs. Camo & Krooked / Camo & Krooked)	Berzerk
2009	"Blow"	Have-A-Break Recordings
2009	"Get Funky" / "The Fear"	Viper Recordings
2009	"Fatman" (b/w "Toxic" by Kos & Tenchu)	Mainframe Recordings
2009	"Dakota" (b/w "Zoids" by Shimon & DisasZt)	Mainframe Recordings
2009	"Vampires" (b/w "Oh My Dear!" by DisasZt & Infame)	Mainframe Recordings
2009	"Stage Diver" (Phetsta featuring Camo & Krooked)	Technique Recordings
2009	"Nano" / "The Unseen" (Camo & Krooked featuring Nina / Camo)	Sudden Def Recordings
2009	"Global Warming" / "No Soul"	Uprising Records
2009	"Synthetic" (b/w "Together" (DC Breaks Remix) by DisasZt)	Mainframe Recordings
2010	"Selecta" / "Who Knows the Jungle" (Camo & Krooked / Camo)	Urban Takeover
2010	"The Big Rush" / "Brave New World" (Camo & Krooked vs. Body & Soul / Body & Soul)	Nasca
2010	"Vampires" (Phetsta Remix) (b/w "Oh My Dear!" (Body & Soul Remix) by DisasZt & Infame)	Mainframe Recordings
2010	"History of the Future" / "Verve" (featuring Tali)	AudioPorn Records
2010	"Climax" / "Reincarnation"	Hospital Records
2010	"Stand Up!" (Friction vs. Camo & Krooked featuring Dynamite MC)	Shogun Audio
2010	"Can't Get Enough" / "Without You"	Breakbeat Kaos
2010	"One" / "Heretic" [as Masai]	Mainframe Recordings
2012	"Stand Up" (Sigma Remix) (Friction vs. Camo & Krooked featuring Dynamite MC)	Shogun Audio
2014	"Further Away"	
2019	"Atlas"	UKF Music
2019	"Atlas (VIP)"	UKF Music
2021	"Other Side (Red Bull Symphonic)" (Camo & Krooked featuring Rezar)	Hospital Records

== Other songs and appearances ==
Year	Track	Release	Label
2008	"Sacrilege"	Babylon	Renegade Hardware
2009	"The Reward" (Camo & Krooked vs. Body & Soul)	Acts of Mad Men	Viper Recordings
2010	"Turn Up (The Music)" (vocals by Pat Fulgoni)	Sick Music 2	Hospital Records
2010	"Chic" (Futurebound vs. Camo & Krooked)	Headroom EP	Viper Recordings
2011	"Reminisce"	Fifteen Years of Hospital Records	Hospital Records
2022	"Nova" (with Noisia)	Closer	Vision
2024	"While You Count Down" (with The Caracal Project)	Self Reflections	Self released

== Remixes & Bootlegs ==
Artist	Song title	Release
Future Prophecies	September	Above & Beyond
Noisia	The Entangled	Outer Edges: Remixes
Zedd	True Colors	TBA
John B	Numbers	Edge of Mind EP
DJ Fresh	Talkbox	Kryptonite
Professor Green featuring Lily Allen	Just Be Good to Green	Alive Till I'm Dead
Professor Green featuring Example	Monster	Alive Till I'm Dead
Doctor P	Sweet Shop (with Friction)	Sweet Shop
Shapeshifter	The Touch	The Touch
Hadouken!	Mic Check	For The Masses
McLean	Finally In Love	Finally In Love
Nero	Innocence	N/A
Metronomy	The Look	The English Riviera
DJ Fresh featuring Rita Ora	Hot Right Now	Nextlevelism
Bungle featuring Ayah Marar	The Siren	The Siren Remixes
Modestep	Show Me A Sign	Show Me A Sign
Paul van Dyk featuring Adam Young	Eternity	Eternity
Netsky featuring Billie	We Can Only Live Today (Puppy)	We Can Only Live Today (Puppy)
Reflekt	Need To Feel Loved	N/A
Jefferson Airplane	Somebody To Love	N/A
Ray Charles	Hit the Road Jack	N/A
London Grammar	Hey Now	N/A
Lana Del Rey	West Coast	West Coast EP
Klangkarussell	Netzwerk (Falls Like Rain)	Netzwerk
Justice	Phantom (Justice song)	Cross
RY X	Bad Love	Bad Love (Camo & Krooked Remix)
Mefjus	Pivot	Pivot (Camo & Krooked Remix)/Sinkhole (Skeptical Remix)
Sub Focus	Last Jungle (with Mefjus)	Reworks I
High Contrast	Return of Forever (with Mefjus)	True Colours (20th Anniversary Edition + Remixes)
The Prodigy	Breathe (with Mefjus)	The Fat of the Land 25th Anniversary - Remixes

== Produced songs ==
Year	Artist	Track	Album
2011	Professor Green	"How Many Moons"	At Your Inconvenience
