= Atlas Electronic =

Annual electronic music festival in Morocco

Coordinates: 31°41′07″N 7°54′23″W

- Genre: Electronic, African music
- Dates: July/August
- Locations: Marrakesh, Morocco
- Years active: 2016 – present
- Founders: Karim Mrabti
- Website: atlas-electronic.com

Atlas Electronic is a Moroccan-Dutch organization that organizes an annual music festival in Marrakesh. Its members operate from Morocco and the Netherlands, aiming to support various organizations and their projects in Morocco; according to The Guardian, it focuses on "underground music and cross-cultural collaborations". It was founded by Karim Mrabti, who grew up in Rotterdam, the Netherlands.

== Festival ==
The festival is held annually since 2016, in an ecolodge, the Villa Janna outside of Marrakesh; organizer Mrabti found the place via AirBnB. The festival stood out, according to Scene, because besides Gnawa and other African music, it had such things as art exhibitions, cycling tours, and cooking demonstrations. Mrabti used to promote dance parties in the Netherlands, and organized the first festival within a year after the first conception. At least since 2017 the organization has partnered with Red Light Radio. The 2017 festival, which included British DJ Ben UFO, Floating Points, and Chilean DJ Shanti Celeste, was attended by a reviewer from The Independent, who called it "a stunning Marrakech weekender".

Mrabti has since moved from Rotterdam to Morocco. The fourth installment, in 2019, has "mobility" as its theme. Besides DJs and musicians, there are daily events and workshops, panels, and presentations pertaining to the topic of mobility and a variety of socio-economic issues.

=== 2016 edition ===
Information on AE 2016

The inaugural festival opened with shows by James Holden and Maallem Houssam Guinia (son of Mahmoud Guinia).

Other artists:

- DVS1
- Optimo (DJ duo)
- Wu15
- Bambounou
- Philou Louzolo
- Fred P aka Black Jazz Consortium

=== 2019 edition ===
Information on AE 2019
- Abdullah Miniawy (EG)
- Alexa Kruger (UK)
- ASNA (CI)
- Crystallmess (FR)
- Dollypran - live (MA)
- Driss Bennis (MA)
- Esa (SA)
- GAN GAH (BE)
- Gary Gritness - live (FR)
- Guedra Guedra - live (MA)
- Hadj Sameer (FR)
- Houariyat — live (MA)
- ISSAM (MA)
- James Holden & Maalem Houssam Guinia - live (UK/MA)
- Jayson Wynters (UK)
- Jazar Crew (PS)
- K15 (UK)
- Kamaal Williams — live (UK)
- KAMYN - live (MA)
- Kosh (MA)
- Kreggo (IT)
- Louise Chen (FR)
- Luka Productions - live (ML)
- Maalem Hassan El Gadiri (MA)
- mad miran (NL)
- Mar & Sol Soundsystem (PT)
- Microdosing (UK)
- MMMC (MA)
- Nonku Phiri - live (SA)
- Noritsu (MA)
- OJOO GYAL (MA)
- Otim Alpha & Leo Palayeng - live (UG)
- Penny Penny - live (SA)
- Polyswitch (MA)
- RE:BOOT (DE)
- REALM (MA)
- Sicaria Sound (UK)
- Skotek (MA)
- Soraya (UK)
- Sukitoa o Namau - live (FR)
- Tarwa N-Tiniri – live (MA)
- Tom Simmert (DE)
- Viewtiful Joe - live (FR)
- VOST (MA)
- Whirldfuzzz (UK)
- Yasmean (MA)
