= Watch It Burn (disambiguation) =

"Watch It Burn" is a 2026 song by Katy Perry.

Watch It Burn may also refer to:

- Watch It Burn, a 1997 album by Cast Iron Hike
- "Watch It Burn", a 2011 song by Camo & Krooked from Cross the Line; see Camo & Krooked discography
- "Watch It Burn", a 2010 song by Disciple from Horseshoes & Handgrenades
- "Watch It Burn", a 2012 song by Projected from Human
