= Ivy Lab =

British electronic music duo

- Origin: London, England
- Genres: Drum and bass; Dubstep; Bass music; Electronica
- Years active: 2012-2026
- Labels: Critical Music; 20/20 LDN
- Members: Sabre; Stray
- Past members: Halogenix

Ivy Lab was a British electronic music duo based in London. The project is a collaboration between producers Sabre (Govind Kidao) and Stray (Jonathan Fogel). Their music incorporates elements of drum and bass, dubstep, halftime and hip-hop.

== History ==
=== Origins (2012-2018) ===
Ivy Lab formed in 2012 as a trio comprising established drum and bass producers Sabre and Stray, and their emerging contemporary Halogenix (Laurence Reading), and released their debut single Oblique on Critical Music in 2012, shortly followed by Afterthought. Throughout their first years together, the group garnered significant attention in the bass music scene and was named one of the top 10 DJs of 2015 by Mixmag.

The group released their debut album 20/20 Vol. One in 2015.

=== Halogenix's departure and follow-up albums (2018-2025) ===
In 2018, Halogenix announced that he would be parting ways with Ivy Lab to focus on his own projects. Following his departure, Ivy Lab released their next album Death Doesn't Always Taste Good on their own label 20/20 LDN. The release earned notable praise on its range of influences and experimental approach.

Ivy Lab's third album Infinite Falling Ground was released in October 2022. The album was received positively, with critics praising the emotional narrative of the record whilst still retaining their signature abstract sound. Accompanying the album launch, the duo unveiled the Infinite Falling Ground immersive show in London, before touring the live show to 22 cities in North America supported by Oakk, Nikki Nair, Lake Hills and Sicaria Sound. The A/V show utilized a short film, which was sliced and interpolated with the music from the Album. Kidao noted in an interview that his inspiration for the show originated from a similar concept performed by The Who with Quadrophenia.

In 2024, Ivy Lab released a follow up album titled Infinite Falling Ground Pt 2 which has been described as a "vivid, crystalline dreamscape centered around core precepts of melancholy and parenthood". As with their previous album, the release was accompanied by a visual A/V production by artist Lake Hills, which followed on from the plot of the original whilst exploring the theme of fatherhood.

=== Split and final shows (2026) ===
In January 2026, Ivy Lab announced on Instagram that they would end the project later that year. The duo have shared that they will play a final run of shows and release more music before concluding the project. In their post, they stated that "Solo music is bubbling. Twenty Twenty London is keeping on", confirming that their record label would remain in operation.

== Musical style ==
Ivy Lab's initial releases and style were characterised typically as drum and bass. Each of the three members had an extensive background in the genre. Stray's production typically incorporated elements from jungle music, whilst Sabre has been noted for his more experimental approach. The group cemented themselves as one of the pioneering artists in the halftime subgenre of drum and bass.

Following Halogenix's departure, their music shifted stylistically into more experimental bass music and hip-hop, with one reviewer describing the sound as "futuristic halftime fused with hard-hitting drum work".

Later releases, such as Infinite Falling Ground explore more emotional and unsettling musical themes.

== Discography ==
=== Studio albums ===
Title	Details	Ref
20/20 Volume One	Released 6 November 2016; Label: 20/20 LDN; Formats: Digital download	
Death Doesn't Always Taste Good	Released 11 May 2018; Label: 20/20 LDN; Formats: Digital download, 2 x 12" LP	
Infinite Falling Ground	Released October 14 2022; Label: 20/20 LDN; Formats: Digital download, 2 x 12" LP	
Infinite Falling Ground Pt 2	Released 22 August 2024; Label: 20/20 LDN; Formats: Digital download, 2 x 12" LP	

=== Extended plays and singles ===
- Oblique (2013)
- Afterthought / Brat (2014)
- Twenty Questions EP (2015)
- Mef:Lab (with Mefjus) (2015)
- Arkestra EP (with Alix Perez) (2016)
- Fortuna EP (2016)
- Peninsula (2017)
- Jetlag (2018)
- Cake (2018)
- Stars EP (2019)
- Orange (with Two Fingers) (2019)
- Hotline (with Two Fingers) (2019)
- Space War EP (2019)
- Gunk (2019)
- Fidget EP (2020)
- Cava (2020)
- Talk To Me (with Two Fingers) (2020)
- Teacup (2020)
- Blonde (2020)
- Soul Sista (with Frank Carter III) (2021)
- Press Play (2021)
- Suzuki/Paradise Pistol (2021)
- NOVV/NASDAQ (2021)
- Everythingmustchange EP (2021)
- Balaclava (2022)
- Dogma (2022)
- Profit (2023)
- Ghost x Dead Signal (2023)
- Demon Dust EP (2023)
- Idols Fall / Snap 101 (2023)
- Mild Snake EP (2024)
- Sex Latte (2024)
- OURDOGISMISSING (2024)
- Left With You (2024)
- Blockhead (2024)
- Olo (2024)
- Innocence (2025)

== Awards ==
Year	Award	Category	Nominee(s)	Result	Ref.
2015	DJ Mag Best of British Awards	Breakthrough producer	Ivy Lab	Nominated	
2016	DJ Mag Best of British Awards	Best breakthrough label	20/20 LDN	Won	
2018	DJ Mag Best of British Awards	Best group	Ivy Lab	Nominated	
