= Critical Music =

British independent record label

- Founded: 2002
- Founder: Kasra Mowlavi
- Genre: Drum and bass Electronic music
- Country of origin: UK
- Location: London
- Official website: criticalmusic.com

Critical Music is a British independent record label based in north London, England. The label is the owned and run by DJ and producer Kasra Mowlavi and releases mostly drum and bass records. Since the label was founded in 2002, it has grown significantly and become a widely recognized name on the underground music scene. Critical Music has released tracks by artists including Enei, Rockwell, Spectrasoul, Calibre, and Break, and has a reputation for finding and developing new artists.

Resident Advisor has described the label as "A wealth of innovation, growth and experimentation abounds at 170 beats per minute right now, and you can't get a much better—or more comprehensive—approximation of it all than through the discography of London's Critical Recordings."

== History ==
Kasra Mowlavi started Critical Music in 2002. The label's first release was a single by Dphie – Five Faces / Evolve.2 and from there Critical began slowly but surely gathering fans looking for quality, fresh drum n bass releases. Critical's early years were more about a deeper, underground sound, but with the release of Spectrasoul – Alibi (Break remix) / Organiser in 2009, the label began to take a more dancefloor friendly turn and its profile became much more heightened.

In 2010, the label began running Critical Sound nights at venues around the UK and Europe. Critical now has a residency at Fabric London, and there are Critical Sound nights at clubs in other cities in the UK like Life in Brighton and Basement 45 in Bristol.

The label has gained considerable profile for its releases, a number of which have won recognition within the industry. Mob Justice by Foreign Concept was included in KMag's Best Singles of 2011 and the magazine said Critical 'could do no wrong this year.' FACT Magazine listed the Rockwell Aria EP as one of the 50 Best Tracks of 2011.

In 2011, the label signed the first of its exclusive artists, Russian DJ and producer Enei (Aleksei Egorchenkov). Enei won the Best Newcomer Producer award at the Drum n Bass Arena awards 2011, where Critical was also nominated for Best Label. The label has also been integral in the careers of Rockwell and Sabre.

In April 2020, Critical Music were named 'Label of the Month' by Beatport.

== Artists ==
As of April 2024, the following artists are part of the Critical Music roster:

- Calyx
- Cauzer
- Circuits
- Coco Bryce
- Charli Brix
- Enei
- Fade Black
- Foreign Concept
- Halogenix
- Hyroglifics
- Ivy Lab
- Jakes
- Levela
- Kasra
- Mefjus
- Particle
- Redders
- Rider Shafique
- QZB
- Sam Binga
- SOLAH
- Spectral
- Waeys
- T>I

== Releases ==
=== Critical Music Singles ===
2002
- CRIT001 Dphie – Five Faces / Evolve.2
- CRIT002 Vector Burn – Not Promised Tomorrow / Flame Surfacing
- CRIT003 Mathematics – Blackjack / Sunday Morning
- CRIT004 Vector Burn & Dphie – Not Promised Tomorrow (DJ Friction Remix) / Five Faces (Vector Burn Remix)
- CRIT005 Delta & Format – Sparks / Wishing

2003

- CRIT006 Bulletproof – The Bends / Sanctuary
- CRIT007 SYS-X – L-Razor / Angeldancer
- CRIT008 Ill.Skillz – Forgive Myself (D.Kay VIP) / Forgive Myself
- CRIT009 Calibre – Rockafella / Barca

2004

- CRIT010 Phobia – Future Soul / Mandalay
- CRIT011 Chris.SU – Satisfy / Try Again
- CRIT012 Alias – Plum Fairy / Admit to Love
- CRIT013 Silent Witness & Break – Dialling Out / Godpad

2005

- CRIT014 Breakage – Staggered Dub / 4Me
- CRIT015 Alias – Can I? / Van Cleef
- CRIT016 Calibre – Domeron / Maximus
- CRIT017 Young Ax – Listen Up! / Something Wonderful
- CRIT018 Stress Level & TC1 – Satisfy (Stress Level & TC1 Remix) / Sonar Heat
- CRIT019 Funky Technicians – Bandits / Welcome Aboard

2006

- CRIT020 SKC & Bratwa – Pain / Forget
- CRIT021 Breakage – Blue Mountain / Astro
- CRIT022 Bungle – Too Late / Human Poison
- CRIT023 Silent Witness – California / Atlanta
- CRIT024 SKC & Bratwa / Futurebound – Pain (Brookes Bros Remix) / Frightnight
- CRIT025 Break – Cold Sweat / The Vacuum

2007

- CRIT026 CLS – With No Light To Guide My Way / Late Night
- CRIT027 Chris.SU & Concord Dawn – Sacrifice / To Heal
- CRIT028 Icicle & Nymfo – Shadows of Tomorrow / Unbreakable
- CRIT029 Lomax – Innocent X / Trago Trash

2008

- CRIT030 Breakage Cooper / Rebel Creations
- CRIT031 Icicle Lost Hours / Late Nights
- CRIT032 Sabre & Vicious Circle – Endless / Columbo
- CRIT033 Spectrasoul – Alibi / Dark Hour
- CRIT034 Survival – Portal / The Beginning
- CRIT036 Bungle – Be Like This / The Source

2009

- CRITDIGI1001 Cyantific & Kasra – Outer Limits (Inside Info Remix)
- CRIT038 Spectrasoul – Alibi (Break remix) / Organiser
- CRIT038L Spectrasoul – Taken / Organiser Ramadanman Remix
- CRIT039 Sabre – Original Sin / The Crest
- CRIT040 Serum And Vapour – Live & Direct / True Calling
- CRIT041LTD Various Artists – Kasra – Perception / Stray – Timbre

2010

- CRIT042 Break – Crunchy / Late Drop
- CRITLP04S Sabre – Marvel / Barefoot (w/ Ulterior Motive)
- CRIT044 FD, Hydro & Keza – Canopy / Remorse
- CRIT045 Total Science – Redlines / Skinz
- CRIT046 Stray – Locked Up / Erase
- CRIT047 Bladerunner – Back to the Jungle / Who Jah Bless (w/ Serum)
- CRIT048 Total Science – Redlines feat. Riya (Break Remix) / Scaremonger
- CRIT049 S.P.Y – Fields of Joy / Stormtrooper

2011

- CRIT050 Cyantific – 305 / Opium
- CRIT051 Rockwell – Aria EP
- CRIT052 Enei – Cracker (w/ Eastcolors and Noel) / Danger Dance
- CRIT053 Seba & Paradox – The Light (feat. Kirsty Hawkshaw) / As If
- CRIT054 S.P.Y & Kasra – Surface / Control
- CRIT055 Code 3 – What You Sayin? / Double Dipped
- CRIT056LTD Enei – One Chance / Labyrinth (with Eastcolors)
- CRIT058 Foreign Concept – Mob Justice / Show You (with Kasra) / Babyfaced Battleaxe (feat. Dekka) Digital Exclusive
- CRIT059 Calibre – Piano Bizness / Smooth Baby

2012

- CRIT060 Various Artists – Sequence One EP
- CRIT061 Sabre, Stray & Halogenix – Oblique
- CRIT062 Break – Here We Go / Soundwaves
- CRIT063 Dub Phizix – Never Been / Codec
- CRIT064EP Various Artists – Sequence Two EP
- CRIT065LTD Spectrasoul – Organiser – (Foreign Concept Remix) / Enei – One Chance (Emperor Remix)
- CRIT066 Sabre & Riya – Injustice / Foreign Concept & Riya – Affliction
- CRIT067 Xtrah – Soundclash / Discordance

2013

- CRIT068 Ivy Lab – Afterthought / Brat
- CRIT069 Mefjus – Signalz / Cypher (feat. Kasra)
- CRIT070 Emperor – Begin EP
- CRIT071 Enei – Liberation EP
- CRIT072 Foreign Concept – Tag Team EP
- CRIT073 Mefjus – Contemporary EP

2014

- CRIT074 Ivy Lab – Missing Persons EP
- CRIT075 Emperor & Mefjus – Hello World EP
- CRIT076 Enei – Goliath EP
- CRIT077 Foreign Concept – Make Meals EP

2015

- CRIT078 Sam Binga – Nuh Chat EP
- CRIT079 Mefjus – Suicide Bassline / Continuous
- CRIT080 Ivy Lab – Twenty Questions EP
- CRIT081 Emperor – Into Black EP
- CRIT082 Kasra & Enei – Inside The Box EP
- CRIT083LTD Mef:Lab Remixes: Ivy Lab – Sunday Crunk (Mefjus Remix) / Mefjus – Blame You (feat. Zoe Klinck) (Ivy Lab Remix)
- CRIT084 Hyroglifics – No Drama EP
- CRIT085 Enei – Just One Look / Bad Proof
- CRIT086 Phace – Phace & Friends EP

2016

- CRIT087 Mefjus – Emulation (The Remixes)
- CRIT088 Alix Perez & Ivy Lab – Arkestra EP
- CRIT089 Sam Binga & Breakage – Binga vs. Breakage
- CRIT090 Hyroglifics – All Talk EP
- CRIT091 Signal – Parallax EP
- CRIT092 Enei – Rituals (Remixed)
- CRIT093 Mefjus & Emperor – Hello World 2: Sanity Check EP

2017

- CRIT094 KLAX – Rekanize EP
- CRIT095 Emperor – Dispositions (The Remixes)
- CRIT096 Ivy Lab – Peninsula EP
- CRIT097 Foreign Concept – Skit City EP
- CRIT098 Enei – Wolfpack EP
- CRIT099 Halogenix – Velvet EP
- CRIT100 Various Artists – Critical Music Presents: 15 Years of Underground Sonics
- CRIT101 Mefjus & Kasra – Decypher / Conversion
- CRIT102 Enei – Cold Touch / Transition
- CRIT103 Sam Binga & Rider Shafique – Champion EP
- CRIT104 The Upbeats – Punks EP

2018

- CRIT105 Enei & Kasra – Transmitter EP
- CRIT106 Hyroglifics – South London's Finest EP
- CRIT107 Emperor – Bloodsport EP
- CRIT108 QZB – Unity EP
- CIRC001 Circuits – Coming Through EP
- CRIT109 Shyun – The Beast EP
- CRIT110 Halogenix – Deep News EP
- CRIT111 Foreign Concept – Gozen EP
- CRIT112 KLAX – The Lucid EP
- CIRC002 Circuits – FHIT / Dream State
- CRIT114 The Upbeats – Gamma Ray EP
- CRIT115 Sam Binga & Rider Shafique – Champion EP (Reloaded)
- CRIT116 SpectraSoul – Organiser (Circuits Rewire)
- CRIT117 Kasra – Ski Mask EP
- CRIT118 Enei – Faded EP
- CRIT119 Emperor – Box Cutter EP
- CRIT120 QZB – Take It All EP
- CRIT121 Halogenix – Vex / Don't You Know

2019

- CRIT122 KLAX & Enei – Questions EP
- CRIT123 Shyun & Cruk – See It Our Way EP
- CRIT124 Hyroglifics – Cash Out EP
- CIRC003 Circuits – Euphoria EP
- CRIT125 T>I – Cold Cuts EP
- CRIT126 Levela – Cerebral EP
- CRIT127 Kasra – Focus on the Love EP
- CRIT128 Sam Binga – If The Cap Fits EP
- CRIT129 Halogenix – Gaslight EP
- CRIT130 QZB – Delirium EP
- CRIT131 Enei – Divided Mode EP
- CRIT132 Sam Binga – If The Cap Fits: Remixed Part. 1
- CRIT133 Hyroglifics – Stone Rose EP
- CRIT134 Particle – Empires EP
- CRIT135 Fade Black – Condemned EP
- CIRC004 Circuits – High Resolution / Microdose
- CRIT136 Halogenix – Blej (Fade Black Remix)
- CRIT137 Kasra – Mécanique EP
- CRIT138 Emperor – Backchat EP
- CRIT139 Enei – Sinking EP
- CRIT140 Sam Binga – If The Cap Fits: Remixed Part. 2

2020

- CRIT141 QZB – Perspectives Vol. 1
- CRIT142 Particle – Eskimode / Air Force
- CRIT143 Halogenix & Imanu – Technoid
- CIRC005 Circuits – Nervous System EP
- CRIT144 Serum & Kasra – Noodles EP
- CRIT145 Enei – Deep Fakes EP
- CRIT146 Particle – Thermal EP
- CRIT147 Halogenix – Dragonforce EP
- CRIT148 Levela – Axium EP
- CRIT149 Enei – Voices EP
- CRIT150 Hyroglifics – Best of EP
- CRIT151 Levela – Eclipse / Secrets
- CRIT152 T>I – Integrated EP
- CRIT153 Sam Binga & Hyroglifics – Wicked & Bad EP
- CRIT154 Coco Bryce – Hold The Line EP
- CRIT155 Kasra & Particle – Psychoactive / Tinted
- CRIT157 Kasra – Let It Slide / I Don't Know What The Future Brings
- CRIT158 Enei – Sinking VIP
- CRIT159 Buunshin – Abrasion EP

2021

- CRITIVY001 Ivy Lab & Frank Carter III – Soul Sista
- CRIT156 QZB – Clairvoyant EP
- CRIT160 Bou – Creeper EP
- CRIT161 Workforce – Moods EP
- CRIT162 Particle – Audio Visual EP
- CRIT163 Enei – Dirty EP
- CRIT164 Fade Black – 12 Gauge / Far Gone
- CRIT165 Sam Binga & Chimpo – Maison Binga-Chimpoix Présente: Ultra-Luxe
- CRIT166 Hyroglifics & AC13 – Mercy & Misery / Clubcard
- CRIT167 QZB – Perspectives Vol. 2
- CRIT168 Serum – Gator / Tokyo Rose
- CRIT169 Waeys – Snoar EP
- CRIT170 Foreign Concept – Sticks EP
- CRIT171 Levela – Jacked EP
- CRIT172 Able – Pillar To Post EP
- CRIT173 Enei – Escape
- CRIT174 T>I – Integrated 2.0 EP
- CRIT175 Particle – Nosedive / Wound
- CRIT176 Fade Black – Polaris / Elysium
- CRIT177 Kasra – Guilty / Kanjiru
- CRIT178 QZB – Perspectives Vol. 3
- CRIT179 Mefjus – Hear Me / Without Them
- CRIT180 Voltage – Heaux Music / Congo Bongo
- CRIT181 Hyroglifics – Forlorn EP
- CRIT183 Sam Binga & Particle – Skrrrrr EP

2022

- CRIT182 Klinical – Constant EP
- CRIT184 gyrofield – Retinues / Urgency
- CRIT185 Enei – The Greatest Trick
- CRIT186 Coco Bryce – Daktari EP
- CRIT187 Kasra – Swinging Swords / Black Lemonade
- CRIT188 Imanu & The Caracal Project – Neiges / La Fournaise
- CRIT189 Particle – Drivin' Me Crazy / Switch Hunt
- CRIT190 Halogenix – Techy / Spice
- CRIT191 Foreign Concept – Vibe / Snaresbrook
- CRIT192 Buunshin – Steel Wings EP
- CRIT193 latesleeper – Rubber Ducky / Cellophane
- CRIT194 Particle & En:vy – With U
- CRIT195 Halogenix – Earache / Sekkle In
- CRIT196 Foreign Concept & Phase – Heart & Soul EP
- CRIT197 Kasra & Sylla – Step & Move
- CRIT199 Waeys – Take 2007 / Unfinished Business
- CRIT200 Various Artists – Critical Music: Remixxed
- CRIT201 Calyx – Tempest / You Want It All
- CRIT202 Particle – No Mistakes

2023

- CRIT198 En:vy – Neo EP
- CRIT203 Calyx – Pull Up / Feel The Sway
- CRIT204 Enei – Crash Landing / Imitate Process
- CRIT205 Klinical – Forbidden / Glowback
- CRIT206 Particle – Let It Go / Double Stack
- CRIT207 Kasra – Azure / Negative Space
- CRIT208 Coco Bryce – Nirwana EP
- CRIT209 Enei – Full Metal
- CRIT210 En:vy – Better on My Own / Darling
- CRIT211 Calyx – Cobra / Riddim
- CRIT212 Waeys – 10,000 EP
- CRIT213 Particle – Fooling
- CRIT214 Chimpo – Contrast EP
- CRIT215 Halogenix – Viper Style / Lana
- CRIT216 DJ Hazard – Double D / Undesirables
- CRIT217 Kasra & Catching Cairo – Codeine
- CRIT218 Enei – Other Side EP
- CRIT219 VISLA – RAKKA EP
- CRIT220 Ivy Lab – Idols Fall / Snap 101
- CRIT221 En:vy – Red Hot Fight EP
- CRIT222 YAANO – Lost EP
- CRIT227 Kasra – Spacemen / bb.oo
- CRIT227S2 Kasra – Talk Up / Shatter

2024

- CRIT225 QZB & Sydney Brace – Fix You / Greyhound
- CRIT226 Calyx – House Breaker / Don't Say Nothing
- CRIT201VI Kasra – Tempest VIP

=== Albums ===
- CRITLP01 – All Sounds Electric, Various Artists
- CRITLP02 – All Sounds Electric Two, Various Artists
- CRITLP03 – Critical Sound, Various Artists
- CRITLP04 – A Wandering Journal, Sabre
- CRITLP05 – Machines, Enei
- CRITLP06 – Underground Sonics, Various Artists
- CRITLP07 – Emulation, Mefjus
- CRITLP08 – Wasted Days, Sam Binga
- CRITLP09 – Rituals, Enei
- CRITLP10 – Biocellulose, Current Value
- CRITLP11 – Dispositions, Emperor
- CRITLP12 – Critical Music Presents: Modified Sonics
- CRITLP14 – New Energy, Vol. 1, Various Artists
- CRITLP15 – Blank Canvas, T>I
- CRITMLP001 – Remote Transmissions, Enei & Kasra
- CRITLPXX – 20 Years of Underground Sonics, Various Artists
- CRITLP16 – Humans, Enei
- CRITMLP002 – Repetition, Waeys
- CRITLP17 – I'll Wait, I Guess, Hyroglifics
- CRITLP18 – Future Forever, QZB
- CRITLP19 – Pyro, Particle
- CRITMLP003 – Dream Metal, Kasra

== Sister labels ==
In 2010, Modulations was set up as a sister label to Critical Music. Label owner Kasra described Modulations as "the DnB version of a singles club" and has emphasized the collectability of the 10" vinyl only releases which all have high quality packaging. Artists releasing on the label include Lenzman, Dub Phizix, Vicious Circle & Jubei and June Miller. Its last release was in 2013.

Critical Music would also release 2 other series under the Critical name. Those being Binary and Systems. Both of these continue to this day.

=== Modulation Singles ===
- MODULE001 Lenzman – More Than I Can Take / Silhouette
- MODULE002 Hybris – The Cleaner / Raindance
- MODULE003 Judda – Pressure Plate / Rodan
- MODULE004 Nymfo – Try To Forget / Autonomous Robot
- MODULE005 FD – Stack / Sent Down
- MODULE006 Vicious Circle & Jubei – Deliberate / Cloak & Dagger
- MODULE007 Dub Phizix – Break It / Four
- MODULE008 D*Minds – Subcrate / Stone River
- MODULE009 Mortem – Get Closer / Monoveler
- MODULE010 June Miller – Snapcase / Walls of Jericho
- MODULE011 Xtrah – Set The Levels / Regain Control
- MODULE012 Emperor – Monolith / Tension
- MODULE014 Stray – Ginseng Smash / Akina
- MODULE015 Ruffhouse & Clarity – Persecute / Aphasia
- MODULE016 Sam Binga – Ayo / Freezy

=== Binary Singles ===
- Binary Vol. 1 – Hyroglifics
- Binary Vol. 2 – Klax
- Binary Vol. 3 – Billain
- Binary Vol. 4 – Current Value
- Binary Vol. 5 – Posij
- Binary Vol. 6 – Substension
- Binary Vol. 7 – Signal
- Binary Vol. 8 – Vromm
- Binary Vol. 9 – Obeisant
- Binary Vol. 10 – Monty
- Binary Vol. 11 – Kije
- Binary Vol. 12 – Kiril
- Binary Vol. 14 – Cruk
- Binary Vol. 15 – Kumarachi
- Binary Vol. 16 – T>I
- Binary Vol. 17 – Stoner
- Binary Vol. 18 – Particle
- Binary Vol. 19 – Klippee
- Binary Vol. 20 – Able
- Binary Vol. 21 – Waeys
- Binary Vol. 22 – Trex
- Binary Vol. 23 – Cauzer
- Binary Vol. 24 – En:vy
- Binary Vol. 25 – YAANO
- Binary Vol. 26 – VISLA
- Binary Vol. 27 – Spectral
- Binary Vol. 28 – SMG

=== Systems Singles ===
- Systems 001 – Halogenix
- Systems 002 – Fre4knc
- Systems 003 – Klax
- Systems 004 – Signal
- Systems 005 – Redders
- Systems 006 – Current Value
- Systems 007 – Sam Binga & Chimpo
- Systems 008 – Vromm
- Systems 009 – QZB
- Systems 010 – Shyun
- Systems 011 – Was A Be & Synth Ethics
- Systems 012 – Kiril
- Systems 014 – Fox, Sam Binga & Foreign Concept
- Systems 015 – Bou
