= All Fall Down (Camo & Krooked song) =

"All Fall Down / Breezeblock"

Single by Camo & Krooked featuring Shaz Sparks

from the album Cross the Line
- Released: 3 June 2011
- Genre: Dubstep ("All Fall Down"); Drum & Bass ("Breezeblock")
- Length: 3:46 ("All Fall Down"); 4:32 ("Breezeblock")
- Label: Hospital Records
- Songwriter(s): Markus Wagner, Reinhard Rietsch, Robbie Bronnimann
- Producer(s): Camo & Krooked

Camo & Krooked singles chronology
"Can't Get Enough" / "Without You" (2010)	"All Fall Down" / "Breezeblock" (2011)	"Make the Call" / "In the Future" (2011)

Music Videos
- All Fall Down on YouTube
- Breezeblock on YouTube

"All Fall Down" is a dubstep song by Austrian drum and bass duo Camo & Krooked. The song features trance music vocalist Shaz Sparks, who is known for her collaborations with drum and bass artist John B, with lyrics co-written by Robbie Bronnimann. It was released as a single along with the AA-side track "Breezeblock". The single was released in the United Kingdom on 3 June 2011 through Hospital Records. Both tracks from the single appear on their second studio album Cross the Line.

"All Fall Down" became one of the Camo & Krooked's first charting songs as it has reached number 196 in the UK Singles Chart, as well as number 40 in the UK Dance Chart and number 20 in the UK Indie Chart.

== Music videos ==
A music video was released for "All Fall Down" on YouTube through the official Hospital Records channel and through the UKF Music channel UKFDubstep. It was first published on 3 June 2011. The video was designed in a digitally-generated fantasy world, similar to that portrayed in the Tron franchise.

A music video for "Breezeblock" was also released on the same day through the Hospital Records channel and through UKF Music's second channel UKFDrumandBass. The video visualises a fictional game show called 'The Drop' where two contestants (Geoff and Wendy) have a dance-off against each other trying to not collapse to the floor with exhaustion.

== Track listing ==
Digital download
No.	Title	Length
1.	"All Fall Down" (featuring Shaz Sparks) (Original Mix)	3:49
2.	"All Fall Down" (featuring Shaz Sparks) (Club Mix)	4:11
3.	"Breezeblock" (Original Mix)	4:39

== Chart performance ==
Chart (2011)	Peak position
UK Dance (OCC)	40
UK Indie (OCC)	20
UK Singles (Official Charts Company)	196
