= Sicaria Sound =

Electronic music duo

Sicaria Sound were an electronic music duo composed of Lou Nour and Sancha Ndeko.

== History ==
Lou Nour (FKA Imbratura) was born and raised in London with full Moroccan heritage. Sancha Ndeko is South-Sudanese and English and was born in Sheffield, grew up in Ghana and Nigeria before moving back to the UK to live in Bournemouth prior to settling in London. Having met at the back of a lecture hall at university where they were both studying Geography, they bonded over Fabric nightclub as well as their joint love for bass heavy music, particularly dubstep. They began attending nights together, which they have stated as being seminal in creating the foundations for Sicaria Sound. Whilst living together, they started to learn how to mix. After university they both worked in radio production.

They are the first resident DJs for the Deep Medi Musik label, and have played events such as Glastonbury Festival, Boomtown Festival, Outlook Festival and Atlas Electronic. Since 2018 they have held a monthly residency on Rinse FM where they focus on playing new material from underground artists. In 2020 they launched their Cutcross imprint to “champion the melting pot of bass-centric sounds teetering around 140 BPM…whilst spotlighting underground artists" with the label's first release being a four track multi-artist EP. In March 2021 they made their production debut with their first EP 'Binate'.

At the end of 2021 the duo announced that they would no longer be performing together due 'health and well-being reasons'. The split was amicable. Sancha Ndeko continues to DJ and release music under the name Mia Koden, as does Nour under the name Sicaria, until February 2026 where she changed her artist name for Lou Nour.
