= Camo & Krooked =

Austrian electronic music duo

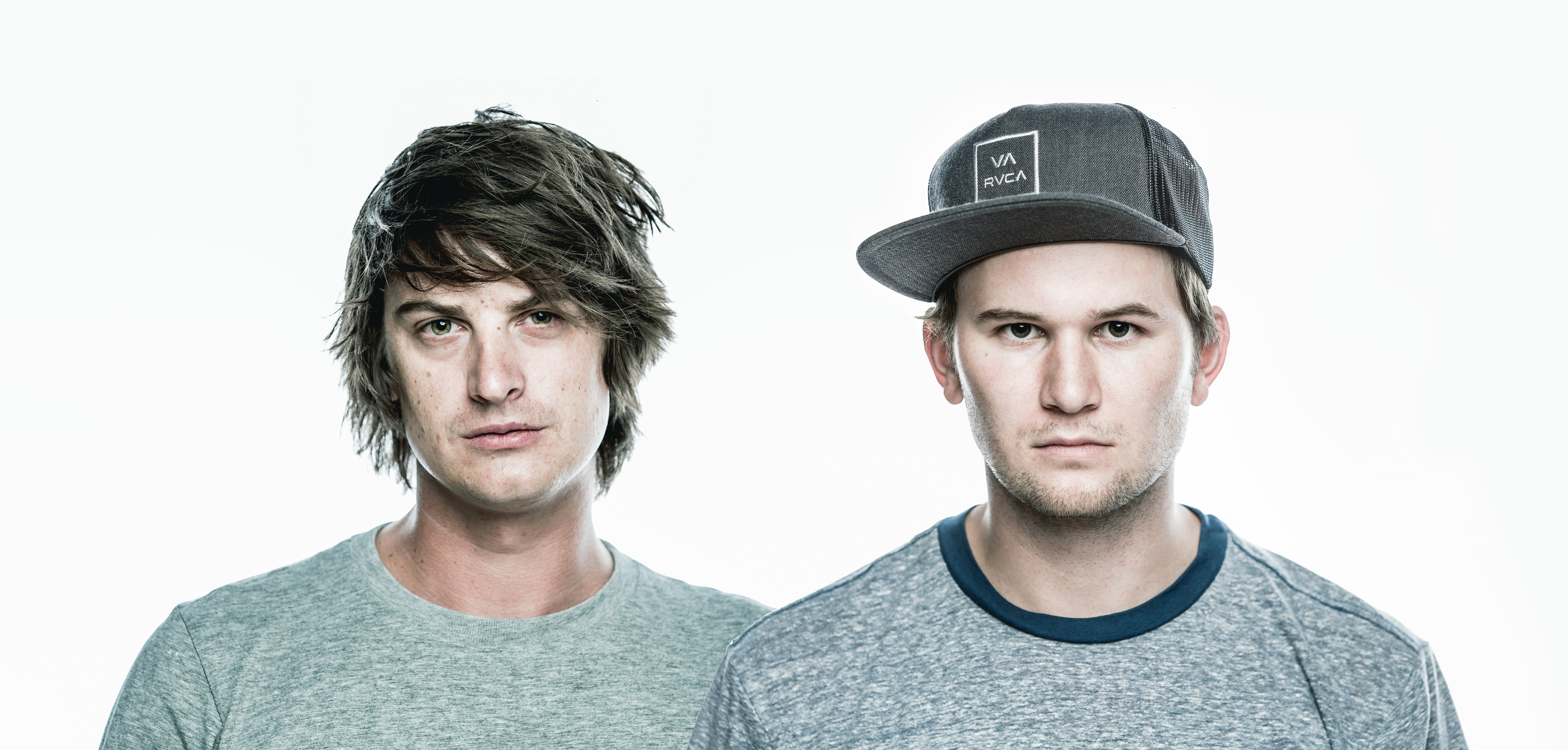
- Camo & Krooked in 2013

Background information
- Also known as: Masai; Chrome
- Origin: Vienna, Austria
- Genres: Drum and bass; drumstep; dubstep; electro; house; funk; minimal
- Years active: 2007–present
- Labels: MODUS; Mosaik Records; RAM Records; Hospital Records; Mainframe Recordings; Beta Recordings; Viper Recordings; Breakbeat Kaos; AudioPorn Records
- Members: Reinhard Rietsch; Markus Wagner
- Website: www.camoandkrooked.com

Camo & Krooked are an electronic music duo from Vienna, Austria with their musical roots embedded in drum and bass, consisting of Reinhard "Camo" Rietsch (born 12 November 1983 in Salzburg) and Markus "Krooked" Wagner (born 31 July 1989 in Lilienfeld).

== History ==
Both Rietsch and Wagner have been producing music since 2002. They met at one of Rietsch's gigs and collaborated to form Camo & Krooked in 2007. Their first collaboration was the track "Play It" from Camo's 2007 single Drop It.

=== 2008–10: Above & Beyond ===
The duo has been releasing songs on various labels throughout 2008 to 2010, including Future Prophecies's Berzerk and Body & Soul's Nasca. More frequently, they've released multiple singles through fellow Austrian drum and bass producer and promoter DisasZt's label Mainframe Recordings. On 12 February 2010, the duo had released their debut studio album Above & Beyond through the label. The fourteen-track album includes a Mainframe Recordings compilation mix composed by DJ DisasZt himself. Camo & Krooked had then released the Edge of Mind EP on John B's label Beta Recordings ten days later. It had received DJ support from many of the biggest names in drum and bass, including Pendulum, Grooverider, DJ Fresh, Adam F, London Elektricity, Matrix & Futurebound, Shimon, Concord Dawn, and DJ SS.

Due to Camo & Krooked's success with Above & Beyond, they won Best Newcomer DJs at the 2010 Drum & Bass Arena Awards, and put out two mixes for BBC Radio 1's Annie Nightingale, Fabio & Grooverider. Grooverider later quoted that Camo & Krooked are "one of the biggest talents in Drum & Bass". Both of these mixes bring to the table Camo & Krooked's usual varying subgenres of drum and bass. They have released successful remixes of drum and bass tracks such as Future Prophecies's "September", John B's "Numbers" and DJ Fresh's "Talkbox". They have also produced remixes for songs by English rapper Professor Green twice: one for "Just Be Good to Green" and another for "Monster". The latter remix was their first venture into the realms of dubstep, a new genre for them.

In April 2010, Camo & Krooked released "Turn Up (The Music)", featuring the vocals of Pat Fulgoni, through Hospital Records as part of the compilation album Sick Music 2. The song contains lyrics based on the song "Turn on the Music" by Roger Sanchez. The track was originally released on a double A-side joint single backed with Netsky's "Memory Lane". Their first individual single release on Hospital was "Climax", released on 28 June 2010. In October 2010, drum and bass producer and Shogun Audio owner DJ Friction had teamed up with Camo & Krooked to create the collaborative effort of "Stand Up!", featuring added vocals from Dynamite MC. Friction had also made a drum and bass remix of the Doctor P track "Sweet Shop" alongside the two.

Camo & Krooked were signed to Hospital Records, on 4 December 2010, and joined the likes of Netsky, High Contrast, and Danny Byrd. By the end of 2010, they had releases on labels including Viper Recordings, Technique, Breakbeat Kaos, Audio Porn, Renegade Hardware, Urban Takeover, and Uprising Records.

=== 2011–12: Cross the Line and other projects ===
Rietsch and Wagner had experimented with minimal techno and house music under the alias Chrome. The duo had released the Paranoia EP, which featured six of their unreleased tracks, as a free download. In 2011, they have decided to discontinue the side-project to focus on producing drum and bass as Camo & Krooked.

Camo & Krooked open 2011 with their two-part Pulse of Time EP released through Viper Recordings. It met the support of acts such as DJ Hype, Andy C, Danny Byrd, High Contrast, ShockOne, Netsky, Sub Focus, Chase & Status, Metrik, and Crissy Criss.

On 3 June 2011, Camo & Krooked released the first single from their upcoming Hospital Records debut album, "All Fall Down" / "Breezeblock". "All Fall Down" features the vocals of Shaz Sparks. The song is another one of their dubstep productions. It reached number 196 on the UK Singles Chart, making it Camo & Krooked's first ever charting single. It has also charted at number 40 in the UK Dance Chart and number 20 in the UK Indie Chart, and it is one of their most commercially successful singles to date. During 2011, due to the success of the release, as well as their growing discography, they have played live at many festivals throughout Europe. Some of these gigs were alongside big names of the genre, such as Chase & Status and Sub Focus. They've performed at the Relentless Nass festival, and also at the Global Gathering festival, both in July 2011. In addition, they also headlined the Strongbow stage at the V Festival in August 2011.

The second single off of Camo & Krooked's untitled second album, "Make The Call", featuring the vocals of Bristol-based drum and bass musician TC, was released on 12 September 2011, accompanied by the AA-side track "In the Future" featuring Jenna G and Futurebound. "Make the Call" was one of their few songs produced in the style of electro house music. The single was their last released prior to the album's release in the latter months of 2011, which in August 2011 was revealed to be named Cross The Line. In BBC Radio 1's show of Fabio and Grooverider (12 September), Camo & Krooked announced the album was to be released on 3 October. The title track from Cross the Line featuring singer Ayah Marar was released as the album's third single on 14 November 2011.

They produced Professor Green's track "How Many Moons" for the album At Your Inconvenience, which was released on 28 October 2011. A remix of the song featuring British grime artists Dream McLean and Rinse was released as a promotional single on 21 April 2012. It was available on vinyl as part of Record Store Day 2012, and also featured on the "Never Be a Right Time" EP.

On 1 December 2011, Camo & Krooked were awarded with the Best Producer title at the 2011 Drum and Bass Arena Awards.

The duo has produced music for various video game companies. They've made an official rework of the James Bond theme featured in the trailer for the 2011 video game remastering GoldenEye 007: Reloaded. Also, they have produced multiple tracks for the soundtrack of the 2012 video game SSX. They have created the majority of the tracks along with The Qemists and Raffertie.

Camo & Krooked released a remix album for Cross the Line on 19 March 2012. Between the Lines features remixes from High Maintenance, BCee, InsideInfo, Submorphics, Metrik, Mind Vortex, Smooth, Sub Zero, Fred V & Grafix, FuntCase, as well as material from the duo themselves.

=== 2013–2015: Zeitgeist and Gravitas ===
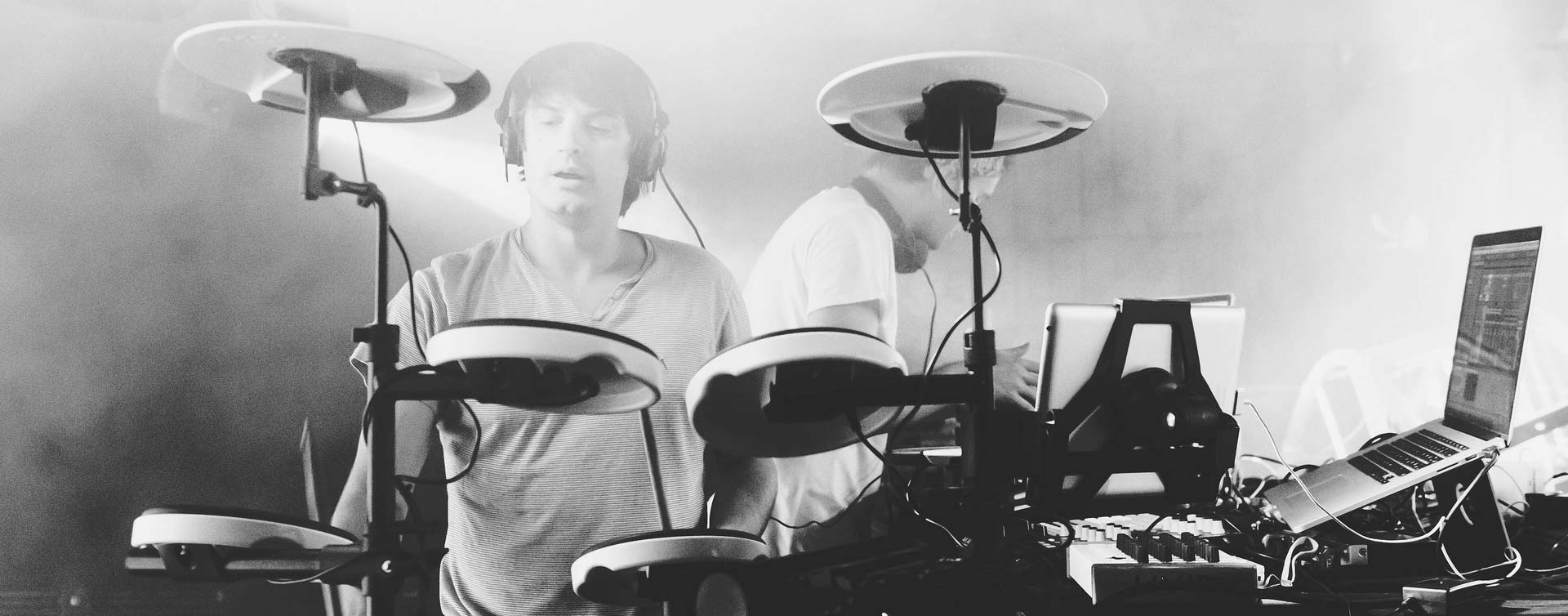
Camo & Krooked performing at Urban Art Forms Festival 2014.

The first single of Camo & Krooked's third album, "All Night" was released on 1 July 2013, the vocals for which were performed by Pat Fulgoni. It was followed by "Move Around", featuring the vocals of Ian Shaw, which was released on 9 September 2013. Their third studio album, titled Zeitgeist (meaning "spirit of the age" or "spirit of the time"), was released on 30 September 2013 through Hospital Records. The album contains influences of disco, French house and minimal music merged with their signature production style. It also features collaborations with fellow Viper Recordings / Hospital Records artist Metrik and Norwegian indie-electronic duo Lemâitre. The album's third single "Loving You is Easy" was released on 11 November 2013.

After Zeitgeist tour they released couple remixes for Lana Del Rey "West Coast" and Klangkarussell "Netzwerk (Falls Like Rain)".

In June 2015 after a long period of silence they presented composition "Gravitas" which was produced for Red Bull's skydiving team.

=== 2016–2018: Mosaik ===
On 17 February 2015 the duo announced that they are working on a new album which they stated would be a logical progression of their previous album Zeitgeist. On 7 October 2016 Camo & Krooked presented new music at Red Bull Listening Session 2016. They revealed the title of their album to be Mosaik which will be released in May on their new own imprint Mosaik Musik, RAM Records and BMG. The first sampler, "If I Could" featuring vocals from Joe Killington plus flipside "Ember", was released on 11 November.

On 9 December 2016 the video to the song "Black Or White", featuring vocals from Tasha Baxter, was presented by Red Bull 20 before 17. It was produced by Filmspektakel.

On 7 February 2017 Camo & Krooked revealed that their next single "Good Times Bad Times" and flipside "Honesty" will be released on 3 March.

Also in February 2017, Camo & Krooked announced that they will premiere their new album in Fabric London on 26 May 2017.

A remix album, titled "Mosaik Remixed", was released on 23 March 2018, featuring remixes from the likes of Culture Shock, Fred V & Grafix, Noisia and Signal.

=== 2019–present: Red Bull Symphonic and MODUS ===
They have released four singles in 2019; the first one being "Atlas" on 8 February as part of UKF's 10-year anniversary, the second one being "Loa" on 7 June via Hospital Records, the third one being "Kallisto" in collaboration with Mefjus on 23 August via Hospital Records and the fourth one being "Set It Off" featuring vocals from Jeru the Damaja on 15 November via Hospital Records.

In February 2020, they performed a concert with composer Christian Kolonovits and the "Max Steiner Orchestra", resulting in the album Red Bull Symphonic.

In 2020, Camo & Krooked and Mefjus launched the production project SINTH, focusing on mixing, mastering, and writing outside of drum and bass. Under this alias, they produced the track "Leben" for German rapper GReeeN, released in August 2020.

During the COVID-19 pandemic, Camo & Krooked played various shows in unusual locations such as on a wind turbine and a hot air balloon. Their single "No Tomorrow", released in October 2020, features Mefjus and Sophie Lindinger.

Another single with Mefjus, titled "Sientelo" was released in August 2021, followed by "U" in December 2021. In April 2022, Camo & Krooked and Mefjus announced the launch of their own label "MODUS" with the date 22-04-22 mentioned in the label teaser on YouTube.
