= Red Light Radio =

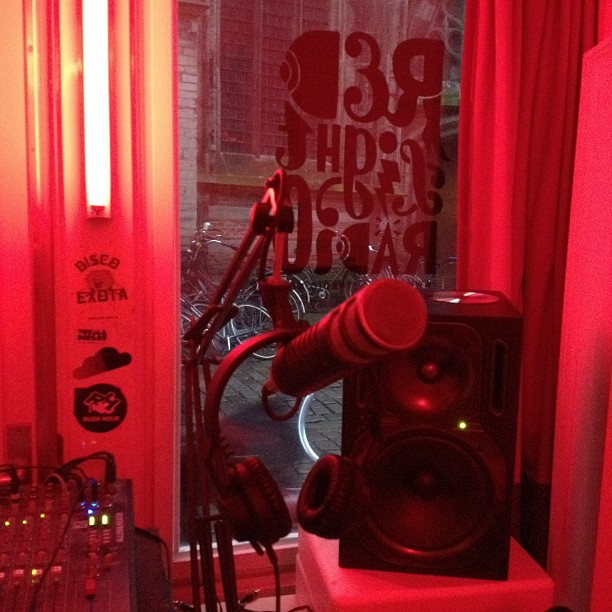
Interior of the Red Light Radio studio

Red Light Radio (RLR) was an online radio station and international music platform based in Amsterdam’s Red Light District. From 2010 to 2020, Red Light Radio broadcast daily shows of local and international artists, and was involved with parties and concerts, and collaborated with festivals, museums and other cultural partners all over the world.

The main goal of the station was to spread underground music. The station broadcast approximately 40 different live shows every week. These were streamed live and then available on demand on the radio station's website, Mixcloud and Soundcloud. Through the years RLR built a global community with music lovers and fans.

RLR ended its daily radio shows in mid-2020, saying it had "always been aware" its Oudekerksplein location was temporary, but COVID lockdowns had "accelerated the inevitable goodbye."

== Location ==
The location of the radio studio was in a former brothel in the heart of Amsterdam's Red Light District. They shared the building with many Amsterdam creatives and the record stores Red Light Records & Vintage Voudou. The radio studio was right behind a window between the prostitutes at the Oudekerksplein, next to Amsterdam's oldest building, the Oude Kerk.

Red Light Radio also travelled with a mobile studio to broadcast from different locations. There were dozens of collaborations with cultural partners and events. There were live broadcasts from parties, museums, festivals and other spaces. Next to Holland, the station visited China, Russia, USA, Switzerland, Germany, France, Italy, Spain, Sweden & Turkey for several radio broadcasts and events.

== Guests ==
Over the years Red Light Radio had many international guests at their station including live sessions & DJ-sets by Allah-Las, Andrew WK, Charanjit Singh, Chelsea Wolfe, Connan Mockasin, Death, Dirty Fences, Frits Wentink, Homeboy Sandman, J Mascis, Joey Anderson, John Cooper Clarke, Jonwayne, Joy Orbison, Mac DeMarco, Marcellus Pittman, Max D, Wooden Shjips, Nisennenmondai, NOFX, Nothing, Optimo, Peaking Lights, Randomer, Ron Morelli, Seth Troxler, Shabazz Palaces, Silent Servant, Solar, Suuns, Suzanne Kraft, The Gaslamp Killer, The Shrine, The Soft Moon, Traxx, Vakula, Veronica Vasicka, Viet Cong & Wooden Wisdom.

== Awards ==
In 2015 Red Light Radio won Mixcloud's Best Online Radio Station award and visited the International Radio Festival in Zürich in August 2015.
