= Tarwa N-Tiniri =

Moroccan desert blues band

Tarwa N-Tiniri ⵜⴰⵔⵡⴰ ⵏ ⵜⵉⵏⵉⵔⵉ
- Origin: Ouarzazate, Morocco
- Genres: Desert blues, World, Rock
- Years active: 2012–present
- Label: Atty Records
- Website: tarwantiniri.com

Tarwa N-Tiniri (Berber languages: ⵜⴰⵔⵡⴰ ⵏ ⵜⵉⵏⵉⵔⵉ) are a five-piece (Note: Started with six members) desert blues band from Ouarzazate in Morocco. The all-Berber band was formed in 2012. They have released the albums Azizdeg (2019) and Akal (2024). They have toured Norway and France. The band’s name means "sons of the desert". The band performed at the Jerusalem Jazz Festival in 2023, and at Sfinks festival in Belgium and Córdoba Guitar Festival in 2024.
