= Current Value =

- Born: Tim Eliot
- Origin: Berlin, Germany
- Genres: Drum and bass, neurofunk, darkstep, techstep, dubstep
- Occupations: Producer, DJ
- Years active: 1997–present
- Labels: Position Chrome; Don Q Records; Soothsayer; Intransigent; Subsistenz; Barcode; Blackout; Critical; Invisible; Souped Up Records; MethLab Recordings
- Website: currentvalue.eu

Tim Eliot, better known by his stage name Current Value, is a German drum & bass producer and DJ. Eliot began dabbling in electronic music in 1992, when he got a Casio keyboard for Christmas. Several years later he began receiving recognition on local Berlin radio stations. In 2004, after 1 year of education, he received his Diploma at the School of Audio Engineering (SAE).

In 2012, his remix of a track from Björk's album Biophilia, was included on Biophilia Remix Series I.

== Discography ==
=== Albums ===
- Frequency Hunt (August 18, 1998)
- Seeds Of Mutation (March 16, 1999)
- In A Far Future (March 21, 2000)
- Beyond Digits (August 2, 2002)
- 2012: The Day Of Silence (November 23, 2009)
- Back To The Machine (August 23, 2010)
- Revolt & Riot (July 4, 2011) (with Donny)
- Quantum Physics (October 29, 2012)
- Stay On This Planet (September 30, 2013)
- Biocellulose (March 25, 2016)
- Deadly Toys (December 21, 2017)
- PUER (October 17, 2019)
- SENEX (December 17, 2019)
- The All Attracting (April 15, 2021)
- Platinum Scatter (September 15, 2022)
- Beneath The Sonics (August 4, 2023)
- Holodeck (June 18, 2026)

=== EPs ===
- The Empowered Peace (November 11, 2008) [Tech Itch]
- You Can't Play God (March 16, 2009) [Freak]
- Crude Chronicles (March 5, 2012) [Subtrakt]
- Megalomania (July 2, 2012) [Position Chrome]
- So Loud (May 13, 2013) [Subtrakt]
- Sonic Barrier (February 17, 2014) [The Sect Music]
- Subs9.5 (May 5, 2014) [Subsistenz]
- Critical Presents: Binary Vol. 4 (February 2, 2015) [Critical]
- Nitro (February 15, 2015) [Blackout]
- Force Black (May 25, 2015) [Bad Taste]
- Rocket Science (September 25, 2015) [Blackout]
- Partition (July 15, 2016) [Terminal]
- Airshift (September 30, 2016) [Cyberfunk]
- Rethink (October 31, 2016) [Othercide]
- Critical Presents: Systems 006 (December 9, 2016) [Critical]
- Starfleet (March 10, 2017) [Blackout]
- Scalar (May 5, 2017) [31 Records]
- Consequences (June 14, 2018) [MethLab]
- City Syndrome (August 16, 2018) [Souped Up]
- Searcher (February 1, 2019) [Invisible]
- Far Layer (March 22, 2019) [Othercide]
- Time Gap (July 6, 2020) [Blackout]
- Runway (December 3, 2021) [Korsakov]

=== Singles ===
- "Skybreaker (Untitled 3) / T.S. Overdose (Untitled 4)" (1997, Position Chrome)
- "Falling Into It / Subsonic" (1998, Don Q Records)
- "Bassriot / Untitled Master" (1998, Position Chrome)
- "Creative Robot / Solution" (1998, Position Chrome)
- "The Edge of the Cliff / Dark Rain" (2006, Intransigent Recordings)
- "Excellence / Twisted" (2006, Algorhythm Recordings)
- "Full Spectrum Warrior / Strange Peace" (2006, Tech Itch Recordings)
- "The Forbidden Room" (2007, Intransigent Recordings)
- "Brainwash" (2007, Evol Intent)
- "Tempest" (2008, L/B Recordings), with Limewax
- "Agent of Evolution / Love All The People" (2009, Offkey Recordings), with Dying Punks
- "Bravery / Echolot" (2009, Venom Inc)
- "Polar Position" (2010, Subsistenz)
- "Lipophil" (2010, Subsistenz)
- "Shy Flame" (2011, Section 8 Records), with Snow
- "Bruja" (2011, Barcode Recordings)
- "Time of the Rain" (2011, Intransigent Recordings), with Snow
- "Control / Birth Cycle" (2011, Forbidden Society Recordings), with Forbidden Society
- "Obsessive" (2011, Counterstrike), with Counterstrike
- "Impact" (2012, Subtrakt)
- "Make It Last / Melo" (2012, Position Chrome), with The Panacea
- "Hydrolic" (2013, The Sect Music)
- "So Loud" (2013, Subtrakt)
- "Ready for Apocalypse" (2014, OtherCide), with Homeboy
- "Maintainer / Tremor" (2015, Yellow Stripe)
- "Neuronord / Serial Fracture (2015, Yellow Stripe)
- "Cotton Punch" (2015, Invisible Recordings)
- "Jet Bike / Traktion" (2015, The Sect Music)
- "Twilight State" (2015, Invisible Recordings)
- "Get Down To It / Fake" (2015, Trendkill Records)
- "Sleepwalk" (2017, Titan Records)
- "Counter Mechanics / Signal Jam" (2018, Blackout Music)
- "Portal Breach (with Abis) / No Halfsteppin'" (2019, Let It Roll)
- "Overturn" (2020, Blackout Music)
- "Cockpit" (2021, Souped Up Records)
- "Atonement / Measures" (2022, DIVIDID)
