= John B =

English DJ and producer

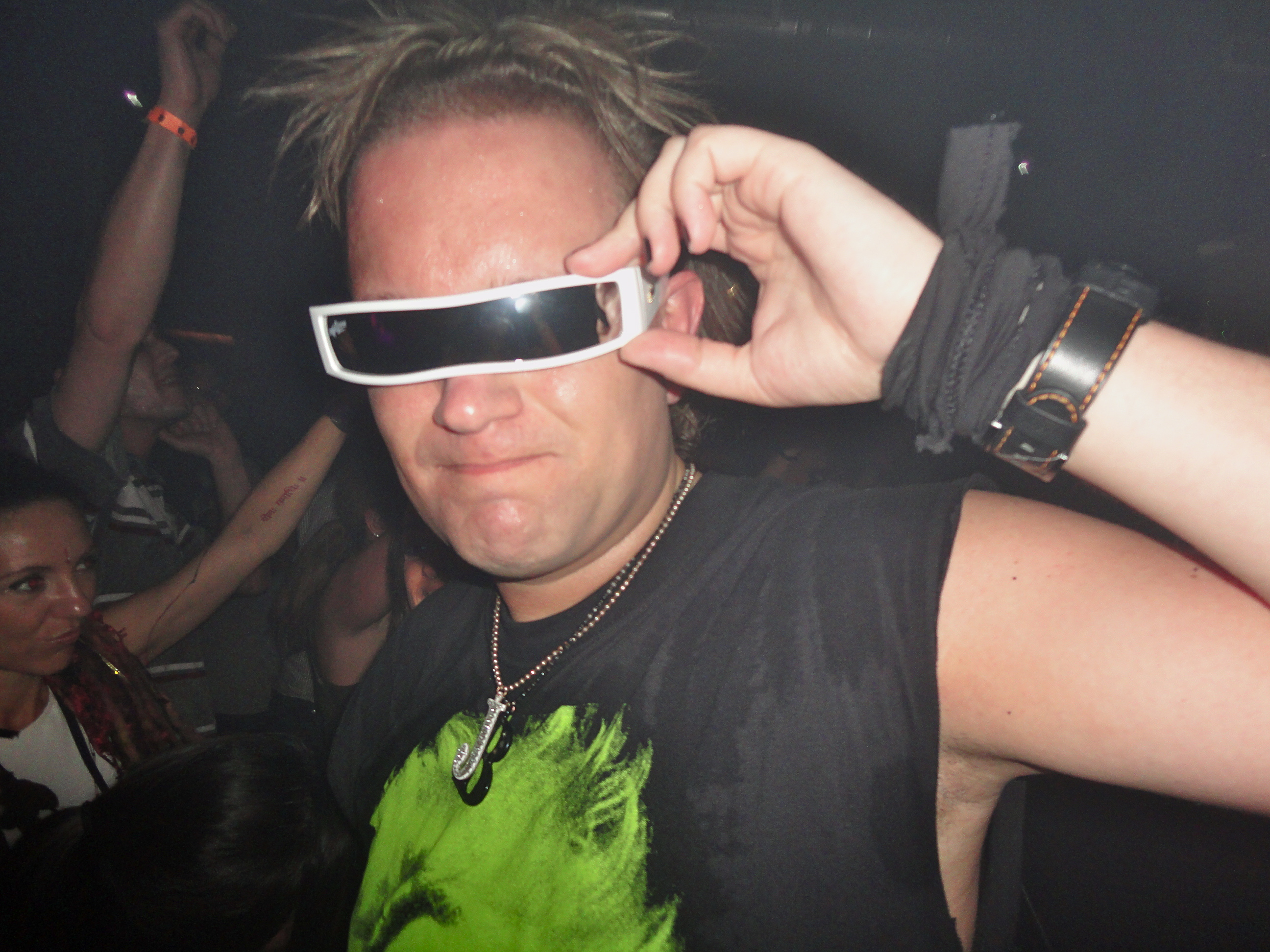

Background information
- Born: John Bryn Williams; Maidenhead, England
- Genres: Drum and bass; electro house; techno
- Occupations: Disc jockey; music producer
- Years active: 1997–present
- Website: john-b.com

John Bryn Williams, known as John B, is an English disc jockey and electronic music producer. He is widely recognised for his eccentric clothing, wild hair, and his production of several cutting edge drum and bass tracks.

John B ranked number 76 in DJ Magazine's 2010 Top 100 DJs annual poll, announced on 27 October 2010.

== Career ==
Williams was born in Maidenhead, Berkshire. He started producing music around the age of 14, and now is the head of drum and bass record label Beta Recordings, together with its more specialist drum and bass sub-labels Nu Electro, Tangent, and Chihuahua. He also has releases on Formation Records, Metalheadz and Planet Mu. Williams was ranked 92nd drum and bass DJ on the 2009 DJ Magazine top 100.

== Style ==
While his trademark sound has evolved through the years, it generally involves female vocals and trance-like synths (a style which has been dubbed "trance and bass", "trancestep" and "futurestep" by listeners). His most recent concentration is a 1980s electroclash influenced fusion of electro and drum and bass, which was dubbed 'electrostep'. At first (around early 2002), this style seemed odd and comical to some in the drum and bass community. However, this move has given John the ability to carry his style of drum and bass forward. He has dabbled in darkstep, jazzstep and various other styles in his time. When he DJs, he is known to spin both drum and bass and electro house, sometimes with other genres such as disco and rock, in the same sets.

== Discography ==
- Visions (1997)
- Catalyst (1999)
- Future Reference (2001)
- Brainstorm (2002)
- Mercury Skies (2003)
- In:transit (2004)
- American Girls (2004)
- Electrostep (2006)
- To Russia with Love (2008) (MixCD)
- Light Speed (2012)
- Evolve (2016)
- The Killada (2022)
- Found In Rave (2025)
