= Mefjus =

Austrian drum and bass producer

- Born: Martin Schober; August 30, 1988 (age 37)
- Origin: Linz, Austria
- Genres: Drum and bass; neurofunk; hip-hop (early)
- Years active: 2013–present
- Labels: Modus; Vision Recordings; Critical Music
- Website: mefjus.at

Martin Schober, better known by the stage name Mefjus is an Austrian electronic music producer and DJ. His music is typically characterized as neurofunk.

== Early life ==
Mefjus began playing music during his primary school years, being tutored to play the trumpet before enrolling into a music school. By age 16 he had begun producing hip-hop with his brother Christian, and collaborated with Austrian producer Bowsar.

== Career ==
From 2013, Mefjus begun releasing music on record labels including T3K, Virus Recordings and Neodigital. By 2013 he had quit from his job to work on music full-time.

In 2014, Mefjus released his debut album, Emulation, on Critical Music. In preparation for writing the record, he spent three months solely focusing on sound design. The album featured collaborations with other drum and bass artists such as Phace and Misanthrop.

In April 2017, Mefjus was the featured artist in the Fabriclive mix series showcasing a mix "made up of 29 of his own tracks, remixes and collaborations with the likes of Kasra, Noisia and Camo & Krooked."

On 26 April 2018, Mefjus released his second album, Manifest, on Vision Recordings. The album was written over a period of two years from what was initially intended to be an EP. The album was listed at number 23 by PopMatters in their 25 Best Electronic Albums of 2018.

In 2021, his single Hear Me peaked at number 36 in the UK Singles Chart.

Mefjus has collaborated with other electronic music artists across the scene including Noisia, Phace, Bou, and fellow Austrian producers Camo & Krooked with whom he co-founded the drum and bass record label Modus to provide a platform for their collaborations. In 2022 the trio released an official remix of Breathe by The Prodigy.

Mefjus has performed at several festivals across the world including EDC Orlando, Bang Face and Let It Roll both solo and b2b with Camo & Krooked.

In 2024, Mefjus presented a thirty minute mix on BBC Radio 1. The mix featured predominantly his own produced tracks, however also featured music from other notable drum and bass and neurofunk artists.

== Discography ==
=== Studio albums ===
- Emulation (2014)
- Manifest (2018)

=== Extended plays ===
- Contemporary (2013)
- Hello World with Emperor (2014)
- Suicide Bassline (2014)
- Incessant with Noisia (2015)
- Optimum Trajectory with Rido (2015)
- Blitz (2015)
- Hello World 2: Sanity Check with Emperor (2016)
- Wastemen with Phace (2017)
- Particles (2020)
- One Year of MODUS with Camo & Krooked (2023)
- Emulation X (2024)

== Awards ==
Year	Award	Category	Nominee(s)	Result	Ref.
2018	Drum & Bass Arena awards	Best producer	Mefjus	Won	
2021	Drum & Bass Arena awards	Best track	"Sientelo" - Mefjus and Camo & Krooked	Won	
2021	Drum & Bass Arena awards	Best artwork	"Sientelo" - Mefjus and Camo & Krooked	Won	
2022	Drum & Bass Arena awards	Best newcomer label	MODUS	Nominated	
