= Two Fold =

Two Fold is a two-part album by Haywyre:

- Two Fold Pt. 1, released in 2014
- Two Fold Pt. 2, released in 2016
