= Days to Come =

Days to Come or The Days to Come may refer to:

== Music ==
=== Bands ===
- Days to Come, Albany Georgia rock band

=== Albums ===
- Days to Come (album) (2006), the third studio album by Bonobo
- Days to Come (EP) (2012), an EP by American DJ Seven Lions

=== Songs ===
- "Days to Come", by Circulatory System from Circulatory System (2001)
- "Days to Come", from the self-titled album by Bonobo (2006)
- "Days to Come", song by Opshop from Second Hand Planet
- "Days to Come", song by Rachelle Ann Go from I Care (album)
- "The Days to Come", song by the 77s from Sticks and Stones (1990)
- "The Days to Come", song by Arno Cost

== Others ==
- The Days to Come, 2019 film
- "The Days to Come" (1971), a play by Yehoshua Sobol
- Days to Come, an episode from the BBC television anthology series Play of the Month
- Days to Come, an online travel blog by TourRadar

== See also ==
- Good Days to Come (2011), a film that won Best Film in the 48th International Antalya Golden Orange Film Festival
