= Haywyre =

American electronic music producer (born 1992)

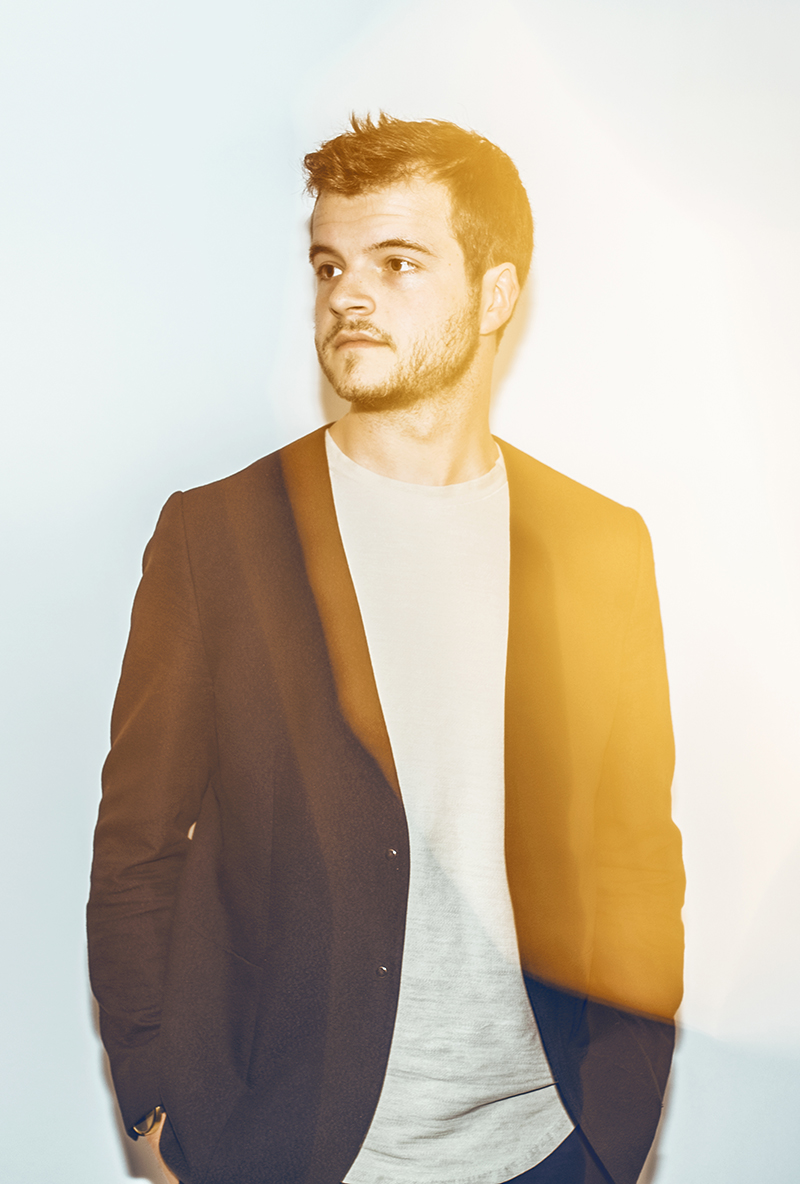
- Haywyre in 2017

Background information
- Born: Martin Sebastian Vogt; August 8, 1992 (age 34); Lafayette, Indiana, U.S.
- Genres: Electronica; funk; disco; glitch hop; house; dubstep; future bass; chillout; jazz
- Occupations: Producer; musician
- Instruments: Ableton Live; piano; keyboard; vocoder; guitar
- Years active: 2009–present
- Labels: Monstercat; Adapted; Caliber Music; GruntWorthy; Lost In Dreams
- Website: haywyremusic.com

Martin Sebastian Vogt (born August 8, 1992), better known by his stage name Haywyre, is an American electronic music producer, pianist, and performer. He is known for fusing elements of classical, jazz and funk into various genres of electronic music, as well as his unique style of piano improvisation within electronic music. In 2014, Vogt released a performance video showcasing his re-interpretation of Michael Jackson's "Smooth Criminal" which saw viral success on YouTube. Vogt has toured with artists such as Mat Zo, Gramatik, Zedd, GRiZ and Rezz, as well as playing festivals such as Coachella and Bonnaroo and headlining his own North American tours.

== Early life and origins ==
Vogt was born in Lafayette, Indiana. From an early age, his parents exposed him to a wide variety of music, encompassing many genres and styles. Vogt began studying piano at five years of age under the guidance of a traditional classical pianist. Vogt moved to Austria with his parents when he was six years old, continuing his study of classical music on piano. The classical recitals, competitions and concerts he performed in all influenced the performance-orientated nature of his later work. Vogt moved back to the United States in 2006, and later went to study at Augsburg College, where he was exposed to a wider repertoire of jazz and classical music, as well as more electronic artists.

Vogt first started to gain an online following when he began uploading original tracks and remixes to Newgrounds in 2009. These first tracks had an ambient/instrumental hip hop style, with later works including influences from dubstep producers such as Noisia.

== Career ==
=== 2009–2010: Lotus and Of Mellows and Revelations ===
Vogt released his debut studio album, titled Lotus on February 4, 2009, and his second studio album, Of Mellows and Revalations on July 18, 2010. These albums drew influence from experimental electronic and hip hop artists he was introduced to in high school such as Flying Lotus, Mobb Deep and People Under The Stairs.

=== 2011–2012: Dubsonic and The Voyage ===
On February 26, 2011, Vogt released his third studio album, Dubsonic through GruntWorthy Music.

Vogt's fourth studio album, The Voyage, was released on January 12, 2012.

=== 2013–2016: Two Fold Pt. 1 and Two Fold Pt. 2 ===
On July 29, 2013, Vogt released the single, "Synergy" through Canadian electronic music label Monstercat. This was followed by the single, "Back and Forth" on September 6, 2013.

Vogt released his fifth studio album, Two Fold Pt. 1, on March 31, 2014. This was the first ever LP to be released on Monstercat, and was met with immediate critical acclaim. Tyler Trew of Your EDM said of the album, "The level of musicality in the LP is unparalleled; Martin extended himself to the furthest reaches of existence and back as a producer, and more importantly as a musician, to cultivate something that is undeniably extraordinary." This album was followed by the release of the single, "Everchanging" on August 4, 2014.

After the release of Two Fold Pt. 1, Vogt began working more closely with Monstercat, and during his second year of college, he interned for the label at their offices in Vancouver. During his internship, Vogt recorded a performance video of his re-interpretation of Michael Jackson's "Smooth Criminal". The video, which has been viewed over 3.4 million times, was uploaded to his YouTube channel on July 10, 2014. The viral success of this video led to Vogt being asked to tour with artists such as Zedd, Mat Zo and Gramatik during 2014 and 2015. It was at this time that Vogt dropped out of college and moved to Vancouver, to pursue a full time career as a musician. In 2015, Vogt also headlined his own North American Two Fold Pt. 1 tour, spanning January and February of that year.

On January 23, 2015, Vogt released the single "Insight", accompanied by a performance video similar in style to his Smooth Criminal remix. This video was also used by GoPro on YouTube to promote their HERO3+ cameras.

Vogt peaked at #8 on the Billboard Next Big Sound chart during the week of January 2, 2016.

On February 8, 2016, Vogt released Two Fold Pt. 2, his sixth studio album. This album included the singles "Do You Don't You" and the performance video and single "Endlessly". The latter was live-streamed all in one take on Twitch. Two Fold Pt. 2 was received well by critics, with Michael Sundius of Billboard stating, "Forward-thinking, yet conscious of the past, [Vogt's] work as Haywyre is both innovative and tasteful." The album peaked at #13 on the Billboard Dance Chart, and was accompanied by a North American tour in February and March 2016.

=== 2017–Present: Panorama ===
In November 2017, Vogt moved back to the United States.

After the release of the singles "Tell Me" and "Storyteller", Vogt released the EP, Panorama: Discover on November 30, 2018. This was revealed to be the first EP in a six-part concept series entitled "Panorama". The themes of these EPs will be "Discover, Form, Fragment, Control, Resolve and Fulfill". Matthew Meadow of Your EDM praised the Discover EP, saying "Haywyre fans from any period of his career are sure to love Discover, as it blends his classic jazz knowledge with blazing electronic flourishes and pizazz... it offers up some bouncy funk and groove like no other."

On February 22, 2019, Vogt released the second EP in the Panorama series, titled "Form". These two EPs were accompanied by a headlining North American Discover/Form tour.

Vogt stated that returning to release independently gave him more creative control over the entire musical process, enabling him to try new styles and genres without having to fit in with the industry. The Discover and Form EPs both explore the performance element of Vogt's music, with each single having its own performance video released alongside. These EPs also place an emphasis on a new, funk driven style, which "bridges the gap between music production and music performance".

== Musical style and influences ==
Vogt's music can be summarised as melodically focused electronic music with jazz influenced chord progressions. His music incorporates a wide range of influences, from the classical music he grew up reciting including works from Liszt, Bach and Chopin, to the sounds of jazz, electronic and hip hop music he was exposed to while studying at high school and college. Vogt also cites Herbie Hancock, Flying Lotus, KOAN Sound, Noisia and Russian pianist Sergei Rachmaninoff as direct influences.

== Discography ==
=== Albums & EPs ===
Title	Information	Charts
Title	Information	US Dance Dance Club Songs
Lotus	Released: February 4, 2009; Label: Self-released; Format: Digital download	—
Of Mellows and Revelations	Released: July 18, 2010; Label: Self-released; Format: Digital download	—
Dubsonic	Released: February 26, 2011; Label: Self-released; Format: Digital download	—
The Voyage	Released: January 10, 2012; Label: GruntWorthy Music; Format: Digital download	—
Infinite	Released: July 9, 2012; Label: Ammunition & Caliber Music; Format: Digital download, CD	—
Two Fold Pt. 1	Released: March 31, 2014; Label: Monstercat; Format: Digital download, CD	—
Two Fold Pt. 2	Released: February 8, 2016; Label: Monstercat; Format: Digital download	13
Panorama: Discover	Released: November 30, 2018; Label: Self-released; Format: Digital download	—
Panorama: Form	Released: February 22, 2019; Label: Self-released; Format: Digital download	—
"—" denotes a recording that did not chart or was not released in that territory.

=== Singles ===
Title	Year	Album	Label
The Observer	2012	Encompassing	Self-released
Mono Nova	2012	Encompassing	Self-released
Draw the Line	2012	Draw the Line	Self-released
Erase It	2012	Draw the Line	Self-released
Synergy	2013	Non-album single	Monstercat
Back and Forth	2013	Non-album single	Monstercat
Everchanging	2014	Non-album single	Monstercat
Smooth Criminal	2014	Non-album single	Self-released
Insight	2015	Non-album single	Monstercat
Endlessly	2015	Two Fold Pt. 2	Monstercat
Do You Don't You	2016	Two Fold Pt. 2	Monstercat
I Am You	2016	Two Fold Pt. 2	Monstercat
Tell Me	2018	Panorama: Discover	Self-released
Storyteller	2018	Panorama: Discover	Self-released
Let Me Hear That	2019	Panorama: Form	Self-released
Contagious	2019	Panorama: Form	Self-released
Never Count On Me	2019	Non-album single	Self-released
Wisdom	2021	Non-album single	Lost In Dreams
Stay With Me (feat. Sixten)	2021	Non-album single	Self-released
White Lie	2023	Non-album single	Monstercat
Chromatically	2024	Non-album single	Monstercat
With Or Without	2024	Non-album single	Lost In Dreams
Change Your Mind	2024	Non-album single	Lost In Dreams
Use My Love (with Molly Moore)	2024	Non-album single	Monstercat
Reverie (with Braken)	2025	Non-album single	Monstercat

=== Remixes ===
Title	Year	Artist	Label
Lose Control	2012	Dove & Knowa Knowone	Street Ritual
Cheyah	2012	Mr Bill	Gravitas
Marijuana	2013	Chrome Sparks	Self-released
Eye of the Tiger	2013	Survivor	Self-released
Breathe	2013	Dubvirus	Self-released
Misty	2013	Erroll G.	Self-released
Hideous	2013	Noisia & Black Sun Empire	Blackout
Subvert	2013	Au5 & Fractal	Adapted Records
Peacock	2014	7 Minutes Dead	Monstercat
All We Need	2015	Odesza	Counter Records
Summer Days	2019	Martin Garrix	STMPD RCRDS
Young & Alive	2020	Bazzi	Parametric Records
Girlfriend	2020	Charlie Puth	Atlantic Records
Hopes And Dreams	2025	Toby Fox	Monstercat

== Nominations ==
=== Grammy Nominations ===
Year	Category	Work	Result	Ref
2021	Best Remixed Recording	Young & Alive (Bazzi Vs. Haywyre Remix)	Nominated	
