= Dracula tourism =

Travel to sites associated with Dracula

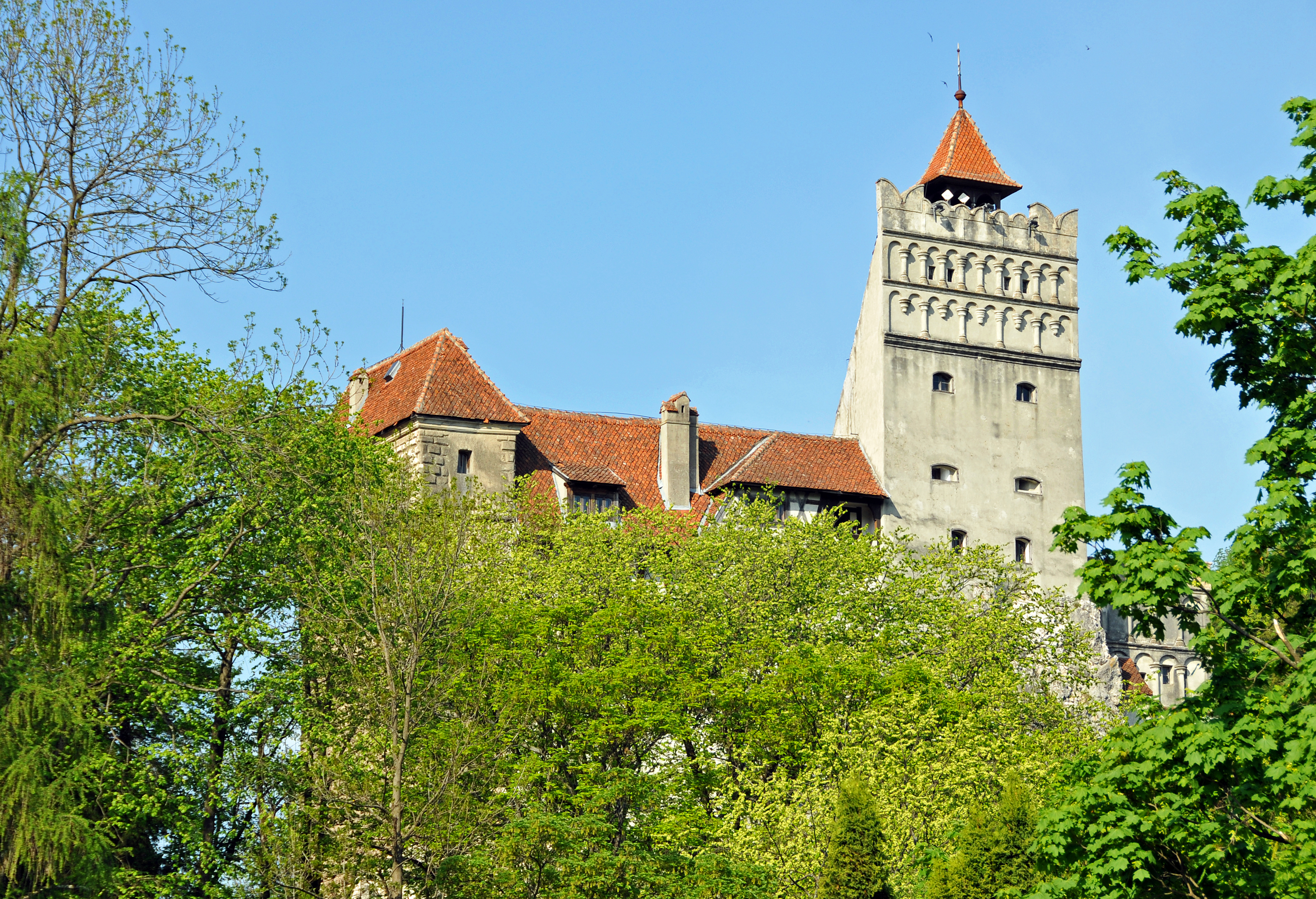
Bran Castle

Dracula tourism is a type of cultural tourism involving travel to sites associated with Dracula and his real or imaginary travels. There is Dracula tourism mainly in Transylvania, Romania.

== Locations ==
The most well-known Dracula tourism locations to visit in Romania are:

- Bran Castle ("Castelul Bran"), considered to be the home of Dracula
- The City of Sighișoara, where you can visit the house in which Vlad the Impaler was born
- Old Princely Court ("Palatul Curtea Veche") in Bucharest
- Snagov Monastery ("Mănăstirea Snagov"), where, according to the legend, Vlad's remains were buried
- The ruins of the Poenari Fortress (considered to be the authentic Dracula's Castle)
- Dracula Museum in Bucharest, which presents both the story of real-life Dracula, the Wallachian prince Vlad III Dracula, aka the Impaler, and also that of the mythical Dracula, the blood-thirsty vampire
- The village of Arefu, where Dracula legends are still told
- The city of Brasov, where Vlad led raids against the Saxons merchants
- The village of Piatra Fantanele, where a Dracula Hotel was built in the very same place Bram Stoker placed the Dracula Castle in his novel Dracula

== Government attitude ==
Although Dracula tourism is a popular attraction in Romania, government leaders prefer other attractions within the country to be Romania's image. The National Tourism Masterplan restricted any Dracula theme parks from 2007 to 2026 to be initiated. The Romanian government views Dracula tourism as a false image of Romania, as Dracula was from a fictional novel rather than a piece of Romanian history. Despite this, Dracula tourism has made an impact on the country's economy in the past and currently there are multiple attractions within the country.

Initially, Romania's government did not view Dracula tourism as problematic due to the positive economic change. Romania's historical Vlad the Impaler was the focus of the tours.

== Awards ==
In 2019, a 7-Day Halloween in Transylvania Dracula tour including 3 Halloween parties was awarded "2019 Tour of the Year" by TourRadar at Festival category.

In 2011 Dracula Tours in London were included in "The world's best vampire-spotting locations" by Lonely Planet.

In 2011 Dracula Tours in Transylvania were included in "Top 5 Offbeat Travel Tours" by Tourism Review.

In 2007 Dracula tour-Halloween in Transylvania was included in a "Top 10 Must-Do Adventure" by Fodor's.

== Dracula park ==
Dracula Park was a theme park proposition by Radu Florescu in 1995. The idea was to attract tourists worldwide and bring a larger audience to Romania and its identity with the fictional Transylvanian vampire. There were over 5,000 share holders and multiple attractions were planned for the park, including a hotel. The theme park idea was rejected until 2001, six years after the initial proposal. Dracula Park gained widespread attention in its development. There was controversy on the theme park and if it would be harmful to Romania's image, and the Dracula Park project was dropped.

== Sources ==
- Light, Duncan, Dracula tourism in Romania Cultural identity and the state, from Annals of Tourism Research vol. 34 issue 3 July 2007. p. 746-765
- Romania Tourism: Dracula Legend. http://romaniatourism.com/dracula-legend.html
