= Gravitas (disambiguation) =

Gravitas was one of the Ancient Roman virtues.

Gravitas may also refer to:

- Gravitas (news), from WION (TV channel)
- Gravitas (Talib Kweli album)
- Gravitas (Asia album)
- Gravitas Recordings
