= Clozee =

French DJ and producer (born 1992)

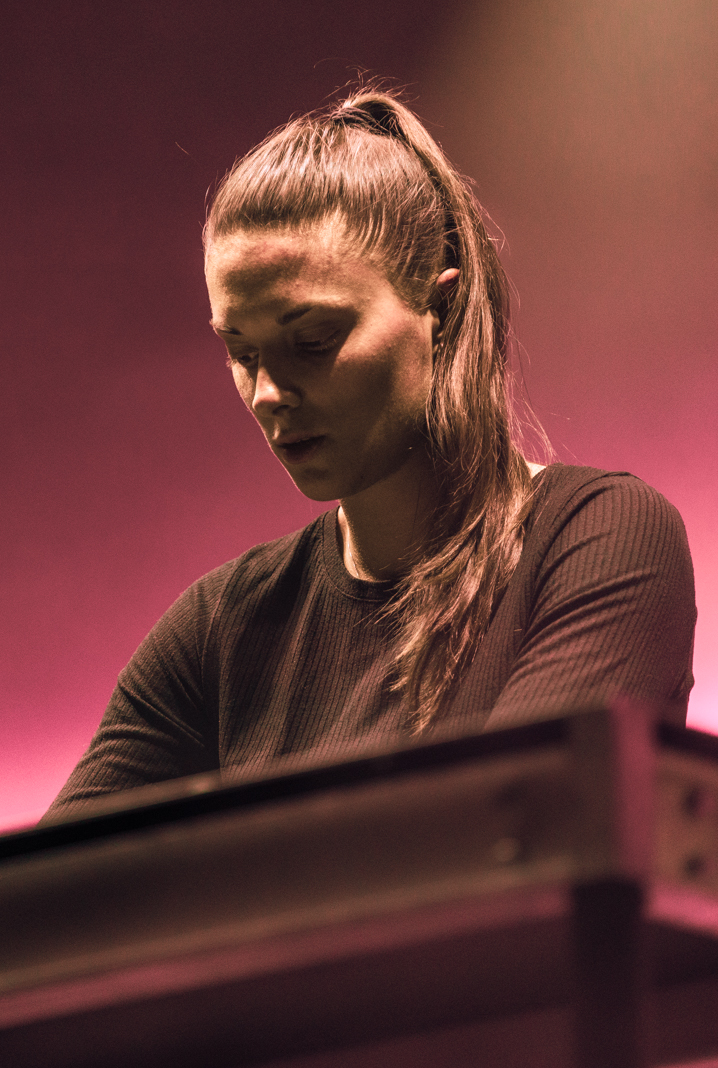

Background information
- Born: Chloé Herry; 12 August 1992 (age 33); Paris, France
- Genres: Bass music; experimental bass; world bass; future bass; glitch hop; trap; dubstep; drum n bass; trip hop; chillstep
- Occupations: Musician; DJ; record producer; label manager
- Instrument: Digital audio workstation, Guitar
- Label: Odyzey, Gravitas
- Website: www.clozee.net

Chloé Herry (born 12 August 1992), known professionally as CloZee, is a French musician, DJ, producer, and label manager of UK bass, glitch, dubstep, trap, and world music.

== Early life and education ==
Chloé Herry was born in Paris, France. At age 11, her family moved to Toulouse, France where her father took a job with Airbus and her mom with the University of Toulouse. She developed an interest in classical guitar after observing performances by Australian guitarist John Williams and Spanish flamenco player Vicente Amigo on YouTube. Her parents enrolled her in classical-guitar lessons, which she took for five years. During this time, Herry formed a band with friends, using the free practices rooms in her town's cultural center and her bandmates' houses to play rock, soul, and funk music.

After high school (lycée), she enrolled in a two-year audio-engineering program and learned how to use FL Studio. Taking inspiration from her classical music background and interest in electronic artists like Bonobo and The Glitch Mob, Herry began producing her first tracks. At 19, she released her first track to SoundCloud, using the pseudonym "CloZee", a reworking of a nickname her aunt gave her.

== Career ==
In 2012, she released her first official EP Dubious; the same year, she self-released two albums, Remixes and Guitar Covers, in which she showcased her interpretations of other artists' songs. In October 2013, she released her second EP, Poetic Assassin, was on Gravitas Recordings i While she continued to find support for her songs in online spaces, CloZee was initially met with mixed reception from French crowds who favored trance and techno genres. Nonetheless she found American crowds to be much more receptive towards her style of music in her 2014 U.S. tour, particularly in Oakland, Chicago and Denver.

A year later, CloZee released the track "Koto", under the label Otodayo Records, after writing it in just two days. Shortly following its release, the track was posted to the YouTube channel "Mr. Suicide Sheep", a prominent electronic music channel, and quickly racked up several million views. As of October 2024, the song has been played on YouTube over 37 million times, and 39 million times by April 2026. Capitalising on song's momentum, CloZee partnered again with the Gravitas label to continue booking U.S. tours in 2016 and 2017.

In 2018, CloZee released her debut album, Evasion. The album marked the project's first commercial success, debuting at number 11 on the Billboard Dance/Electronic Album Sales chart. In French, the word "evasion" means an escape from reality, when used in the context of music. In this context, CloZee's aimed for this album to transport listeners to a welcoming alternate reality.

In May 2020, CloZee relocated with her partner to Denver due to its prominence in the global electronic dance music (EDM) scene. In July of that year, she released her sophomore album, Neon Jungle. Thematically, the album draws heavily on inspiration from the natural world. Its lead single, "Winter is Coming", was written following a visit to Lys, Pyrénées-Atlantiques in France's Pyrenee Mountains, with CloZee inspired to create a sound "echoing snowy mountain views". CloZee decided to keep the song's name, which originally was only intended as a placeholder, as a tribute to the TV show Game of Thrones. A tour had been planned in support of the album, but was cancelled due to the COVID-19 pandemic.

In July 2023, CloZee released her third album, Microworlds. Unlike during previous album recordings, she was not able to travel during the development of Microworlds, limiting her ability to use the outside world for inspiration. This lack of inspirational travel, coupled with writer's block stemming from the pandemic, prolonged the album's development, taking around two years to complete. Following its release, the album was supported by a 45-stop tour, ending on a two-night run held on 30–31 December 2023 at the Mission Ballroom in Denver.

=== Odyzey Records ===
In addition to her solo endeavors, CloZee founded Odyzey Records in 2020. She has positioned Odyzey as an independent label that promotes a mix of live and electronic music to create a "distinct, global sound", through drawing inspiration from cultures worldwide and promoting innovative musicians.

== Musical style ==
CloZee initially described her sound as "world bass", a mix of world and bass music genres. However, due to frequent fan confusion, she no longer uses this term and invites listeners to define her sound for themselves. While the majority of her songs do not use lyrics, CloZee often uses processed human voice samples as instruments in her music.

== Discography ==
=== Albums ===
- Guitar Covers (2012)
- Remixes (2012)
- Ocke Films Soundtrack (2013)
- Evasion (2018)
- Neon Jungle (2020)
- Neon Jungle Remixes (2020)
- Microworlds (2023)
- Microworlds Remixes (2024)

=== Collaborative albums ===
- LSZEE (2024) with LSDREAM
- ENIGMA Mixtape (2025) with LSDREAM

=== EPs and singles ===
- BREΛK LΛB EP (2012)
- Dubious EP (2012)
- Jafump T / Eyes in Eyes (2012)
- Amélie (2013)
- The Poetic Assassin EP (2013)
- Falcon (2014)
- Inner Peace (2014)
- Get Up Now (2015)
- OTODAYO Sūpa Singles (2015)
- Koto (2015)
- Revolution (2016)
- Revolution Remixes (2016)
- Harmony (2017)
- Harmony Remixes (2018)
- Novelle Era (2021)

=== EPs as CloZinger (CloZee with Scarfinger) ===
- Ovation (2015)
- Sinking (2016)
- Forest Echo (2017)
- Royal (2019)

=== Compilation albums curated and mixed by CloZee ===
- Emergence (2021)
- Muzique, Volume 1 (2021)
- Muzique, Volume 2 (2022)
- Muzique, Volume 3 (2023)
- Muzique, Volume 4 (2024)
- Muzique, Volume 5 (2025)

=== Production for visual media and films ===
- OckeFilms (2012)
- BREΛK LΛB (2013)
- Amplify Her (2019)
