= Au5 =

American electronic musician (born 1992)

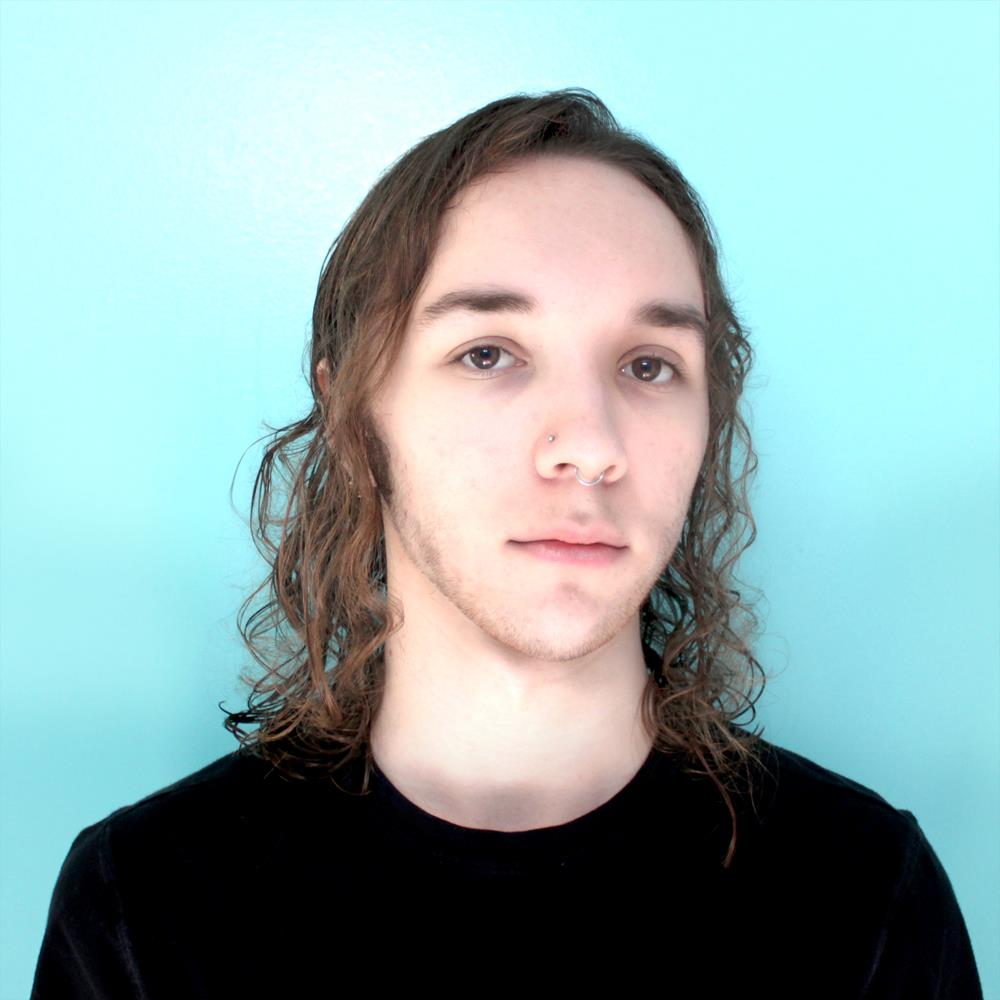
- Collins in 2012

Background information
- Born: Austin Michael Collins; September 18, 1992 (age 34); New Jersey, U.S.
- Origin: Denver, Colorado, U.S.
- Genres: Dubstep; house; electro house; drum and bass; drumstep; ambient; trance; glitch hop; acid jazz
- Occupation: Music producer
- Instruments: Digital audio workstation (Ableton Live, Logic Pro); piano; bass guitar
- Years active: 2010–present
- Labels: Adapted; Anemnesis; Armada; Atom; Darkroom Records; Dim Mak; Disciple; Disciple Round Table; Enhanced Music; FiXT; Funky Element; Gravitas; Heaven Sent; High Intensity Records; Magik Muzik; Metanoia Music; Monstercat; New Dawn; Night Owl Collective; NoCopyrightSounds; Ophelia; Owsla; PhetHouse Records; Rottun; Rushdown; S2TB Recording; Seeking Blue Records; Simplify; Subsidia; Viper; Wakaan; Walt Disney
- Website: au5music.com

YouTube information
- Channel: Au5
- Years active: 2010–present
- Genre: Music
- Subscribers: 129 thousand
- Views: 25 million
- Last updated: 19 September 2026

Austin Michael Collins (born September 18, 1992), better known as Au5 (/eɪ juː ˈfaɪv/ ay-yoo-FYVE), is an American electronic musician, instrumentalist, remixer, and singer based in Denver, Colorado. Au5's output encompasses a wide range of electronic genres including dubstep, electro house, trance, drum and bass, drumstep, glitch hop, and ambient. He is recognized for his work in melodic dubstep, where he is renowned for fusing the influences of trance and dubstep. Au5's musical style is characterized by uplifting melodies and intricate sound design. He is best known for his releases on Canadian label Monstercat, and has also produced several records under Disciple Records, NoCopyrightSounds, and Ophelia.

Trained classically from an early age, Collins began releasing as Au5 in 2010. Au5 independently published the albums Minimality (2010) and Anchus Definy (2011) in the project's first two years. Au5's label releases began in 2012, with increasing influence from dubstep. After winning a remix contest for Seven Lions' "Days To Come" with Brazilian duo I.Y.F.F.E in January 2013, he began releasing on Monstercat. Au5 was active on Monstercat from 2013 to 2015, with several successful releases on the label, including the dubstep track "Snowblind" featuring Tasha Baxter, and the progressive house song "Crossroad", featuring Danyka Nadeau. Au5 collaborated frequently with American producer Fractal during this time, including with the release of the extended play Secret Weapon (2013). "Snowblind" and "Halcyon", another collaboration with Fractal, reached number one on Beatport's dubstep charts.

Au5 produced the extended plays Freefall (2016) with American singer-songwriter Cristina Soto and the experimental The Recency Effect (2018) with Australian producer Mr. Bill, before self-releasing his third album, Divinorum, in 2019. Divinorum was shortly followed by another extended play, Dusk. Au5 made three releases on NoCopyrightSounds in the late 2010s, beginning with "Lush", a collaboration with American duo Last Heroes. This was followed by "Closer" and "Interstellar", both featuring Danyka Nadeau. After a hiatus from releasing with Monstercat, Au5 returned to the label in 2018 with the single "The Journey", featuring Australian musician Trove. Au5 continued his association with Seven Lions, collaborating with him and American duo Crystal Skies on the dubstep track "Remember" in 2021. Au5 would release his fifth album, Bridges Between, under Seven Lions' label Ophelia in 2023. Other notable collaborations include "Impulse" with British producer Culprate, "Anywhere" with American duo Slander, and "Happy Where We Are" with Tritonal.

With the emergence of colour bass, Au5 made several releases within the subgenre in the early 2020s. "Voidwalkers" and "The Other Side" were both produced with British musician Chime, who is regarded as the style's inventor, and released under Monstercat. In addition, Au5 published "Cryptochrome" under Chime's own label Rushdown. Au5 displayed a heavier style in his music with Invasion (2020), an extended play with American DJ Prismatic, which was released on Disciple's sublabel, Round Table. Similarly, "Alien Weapon" was released on Excision's label Subsidia in 2021. 2025 would see Au5 release three stylistically distinctive extended plays: the atmospheric chill-out record Earthwave, in collaboration with vocalist Psyuri; the melodic Emberwake, featuring Collins' own vocals; and the energetic Beyond Light. This trend continued with the dark Inverse EP in 2026.

== Early life ==
Born in New Jersey, Collins was exposed to music at an early age and began weekly classical piano lessons at age four. Collins's first experience with music software was Easy Beat by Ergonis Software, a multitrack MIDI sequencer for Mac, which he used at age eight to sequence out random music ideas. At age 11, he obtained a new Mac with GarageBand, which furthered his music production interest. At age 13, he began learning bass guitar and digital music production on Logic Pro. He later played in several rock and metal bands. Collins began producing trance music at age 15, around 2008.

== Career ==
=== 2010–2012: Early success ===
Au5's debut release was the self-released ten-track album Minimality in September 2010, which featured both electronic and acoustic styles such as trance, ambient, acid jazz and piano. This was followed by the self-released eight-track album Anchus Definy in June 2011, which was the first release to feature dubstep. In May 2012, Au5 released his first EP, Iconoclast, on Atom Recordings, which consisted of five dubstep tracks. He subsequently released a dubstep VIP of "The Seahorse" from Anchus Definy and an original dubstep track titled "Iteration" on Excision's label Rottun Recordings in June 2012. After one year in college, Collins dropped out around late 2012 to pursue the Au5 project.

In November 2012, Au5 and American producer BT released the house track "Partysaurus Overflow". The track was inspired by BT's house track "Partysaurus Rex", which was featured on the 2012 Toy Story Toons short of the same name. The Au5 and BT version would later be included on the 2014 Walt Disney Records compilation album Dconstructed.

In January 2013, Au5 and Brazilian duo I.Y.F.F.E. won a 2012 remix contest held by Seven Lions for their drumstep remix of his dubstep track "Days To Come". The remix was released on Skrillex's label Owsla. Au5 described this in April 2013 as one of several turning points in his music career.

=== 2013–2015: Monstercat ===
In February 2013, Au5 joined Canadian label Monstercat and released the electro house track "Sweet" with Icelandic producer Auratic and I.Y.F.F.E. In May, Au5 and Fractal released "Halcyon", a drumstep track, which reached number one on Beatport's dubstep chart. In July, Au5 collaborated with BT and English musician Aqualung on BT's house track "Surrounded", from the album A Song Across Wires. Au5 and Fractal also made a dubstep remix of "Surrounded". The tracks were released on Dutch label Armada Music. In August, Au5 released his first EP on Monstercat, Blossom, featuring two tracks, "Blossom" (dubstep) and "Moonland" (drum and bass/drumstep). In December, he released the four-track Secret Weapon EP with Fractal.

In March 2014, Au5 released the progressive house track "Follow You", featuring Danyka Nadeau, which was followed up by a remix EP in July, featuring remixes by Ducked Ape, Fractal, Rootkit, Virtual Riot and Volant as well as a VIP. In August, Au5 released the dubstep track "Snowblind", featuring Tasha Baxter, which reached number one on Beatport's dubstep chart a week later. As of April 2020, the track had over 11 million views on Monstercat's official YouTube channel. In November, he released the trance track "Crossroad", featuring Danyka Nadeau, which as of April 2020 also had over 11 million views on Monstercat's official YouTube channel.

In March 2015, Au5 performed at the South by Southwest festival in Austin, Texas. In May, he released the glitch hop track "Dream of Love" with Heavy J, featuring Kenny Raye, on Simplified Recordings. This was followed by the electro house track "Inside", featuring Danyka Nadeau, in June, the dubstep track "Atlantis" in September and the progressive house track "Guardians", featuring Fiora, in October. In September, Au5 released a remix of "Fields of Grey" by Infected Mushroom on Dim Mak Records. Au5's last release on Monstercat until 2018 was "Ison / Pavonine" with Fractal, in November. Au5 stated that he had begun to deviate with the label in terms of sound.

=== 2016–2017: Freefall and other projects ===
In early 2016, Au5 toured the United States with Swedish producer Liquid Stranger and American producer Space Jesus on the "Rise of the Wakaan" tour, his first major tour. In July 2016, Au5 performed at Motion Notion festival in Golden, British Columbia, Canada, which he has said was one of his favourite places to perform at. He also toured with Israeli duo Infected Mushroom on their Return to the Sauce album tour in late 2016 and early 2017. In November 2016, Au5 released Freefall, a four-track EP with Christina Soto, on Gravitas Recordings.

In January 2017, Au5 released his first sample pack, Elemental, on Splice Sounds, followed by a second sample pack in December based on the Freefall EP. He continued to release tracks in 2017, including a self-released VIP of "Blossom" in March and the self-released dubstep tracks "Arise" in June and "Yea Boi" with American producer River Accorsi in July. In November, Au5 released "Goo Lagoon" on Gravitas Recordings. He also released his first track on NoCopyrightSounds, "Lush", with American duo Last Heroes featuring Holly Drummond, in November.

=== 2018–2022: Return to Monstercat and Divinorum ===
In March 2018, Au5 and Australian producer Mr. Bill released the ten-track EP The Recency Effect on Upscale Recordings, featuring five original tracks and five remixes. In April 2018, Au5 released a second track on NoCopyrightSounds, "Closer" featuring Danyka Nadeau. In June, Au5 released his final collaboration with Fractal, a remix of Illenium and Kerli's "Sound of Walking Away". The remix was included in the remix compilation of Illenium's second album, Awake. In August 2018, Au5 returned to the Monstercat label with the dubstep single "The Journey", featuring Australian musician Trove. The same month, he self-released the dubstep track "Cataclysm" with Crystal Skies. Au5 also toured with Seven Lions on his "Journey II" tour in late 2018. In October, Au5 released a midtempo remix of "Eon" by American electronic rock musician Celldweller for a remix compilation album titled Remixed Upon A Blackstar, released on FiXT Music. In November, he collaborated with American musician Nytrix to release the dubstep track "Only In A Dream" on Monstercat.

Au5 continued to release music in 2019, both on Monstercat and with self-releases. These include Energize EP in February, the electro house track "Eden", featuring Danyka Nadeau in March, the self-released ten-track LP Divinorum in May and the dubstep track "Way Down" with AMIDY, featuring Karra, in July. In March, Au5's 2013 electro house track with Fractal "Smoke", from the Secret Weapon EP, was featured on the Harmonix virtual reality game Audica. In July, Au5 appeared on Canadian musician and YouTuber Andrew Huang's "Four Producers Flip the Same Sample" YouTube series, in which the producers were tasked with making a track out of a door-creaking sample. His production was a house track titled "Door House". In October, Au5 performed at Liquid Stranger's new Wakaan Festival in Ozark, Arkansas, United States.

In February 2020, Au5 collaborated with Nytrix a second time to release the dubstep track "Always In A Nightmare". In March, Au5 collaborated with Seven Lions and Crystal Skies on Seven Lions's dubstep track "Remember", released on Seven Lions's label Ophelia Records. He later released his fourth LP, Alchemy, which featured a downtempo style of music . Alchemy was released on SSKWAN, a sublabel of Wakaan. The first track on the record, "Alchemy", is described as a 7-minute "astral fusion" of house, ambient, and downtempo. In July 2020, Au5 debuted on Enhanced Music with "Answers". "Answers" is a midtempo song that includes Collins' own vocals, with a "mammoth" second drop that combines elements of midtempo and future bass. The release of "Answers" on Enhanced concurred with a revamp for the label. In January 2021, Au5 released "The Way To Infinity" under Heaven Sent, a label founded by American duo Slander. In February, Au5 would later collaborate with Slander to release the single "Anywhere" under Heaven Sent. "Anywhere" was previously teased by Slander in November 2020, who played the track during Road to Ultra Taiwan. Au5 continued to release music under Ophelia with his debut single on the label, "The Paper Owl", featuring Arehlai. Au5 returned to Enhanced Music with "Was It You", a collaboration with American pop singer Haliene.

=== 2023–2024: Bridges Between ===
In July 2023, Au5 announced the upcoming release of his fifth album, Bridges Between, on Ophelia Records. It was released on October 13, 2023, reaching over 1 million streams 1 month later.

=== 2025–present: Earthwave, Emberwake, and Beyond Light ===
Au5 returned to extended plays, releasing a total of three EPs in 2025.

== Musical style ==
Au5's music encompasses a range of electronic genres, including dubstep, house, trance, drum and bass, drumstep and ambient. Au5 has described his sound as "melodically and sonically rich electronic music" and has noted that he is especially known for his take on dubstep. He has described himself as fusing the characteristics of trance and dubstep in his music. Au5 has described his earliest favourite styles, before the rise of dubstep, as "trance, glitch/IDM and acid jazz". As dubstep gained prominence, he became drawn to the genre.

Au5 has cited BT as an influence, whom he first heard through the 2011 track "A Million Stars". He has also named Aphex Twin, Infected Mushroom, Isqa, Koven, Madeon, MakO, Mr. Bill, Tennyson, Seven Lions, Sorrow and Xilent as influences. Au5 has stated that his primary influence for producing ambient music was the 1995 Jonn Serrie track "Continuum", which he heard at around age 16.

== Personal life ==
As of 2020, Au5 was living in Denver, Colorado. He had previously lived in California from 2015 to 2016. He has described himself as a "pretty reclusive person [...] despite [his] social abilities".

Au5 has described Fractal as a major personal influence and friend. He also became friends with BT.

== Discography ==
=== Studio albums ===
Title	Details
Minimality	Released: 28 September 2010; Label: Self-released; Format: Digital download
Anchus Definy	Released 30 June 2011; Label: Self-released; Format: Digital download
Divinorum	Released 24 May 2019; Label: Self-released; Format: Digital download, Vinyl
Alchemy	Released 27 August 2020; Label: SSKWAN; Format: Digital download, Vinyl
Bridges Between	Released 13 October 2023; Label: Ophelia; Format: Digital download, Vinyl

=== Extended plays ===
Title	Details
Iconoclast	Released: 14 May 2012; Label: Atom Recordings; Format: Digital download
Singularity	Released: 4 March 2013; Label: Adapted Records; Format: Digital download
Subvert (with Fractal)	Released: 24 June 2013; Label: Adapted Records; Format: Digital download
House Party	Released: 5 August 2013; Label: Self-released; Format: Digital download
Blossom	Released: 7 August 2013; Label: Monstercat; Format: Digital download
Metronic	Released: 2 September 2013; Label: Atom Recordings; Format: Digital download
Secret Weapon (with Fractal)	Released: 2 December 2013; Label: Monstercat; Format: Digital download
Follow You (The Remixes) (featuring Danyka Nadeau)	Released: 11 July 2014; Label: Monstercat; Format: Digital download
Snowblind (The Remixes) (featuring Tasha Baxter)	Released: 7 April 2015; Label: Self-released; Format: Digital download
Ison / Pavonine (with Fractal)	Released: 11 November 2015; Label: Monstercat; Format: Digital download
Dream of Love (The Remixes) (with Heavy J)	Released: 16 November 2015; Label: Simplify Recordings; Format: Digital download
Any Longer / Hit Rewind (featuring Q'AILA)	Released: 10 August 2016; Label: Self-released; Format: Digital download
Freefall (featuring Cristina Soto)	Released: 29 November 2016; Label: Gravitas Recordings; Format: Digital download
The Recency Effect (with Mr. Bill)	Released: 28 February 2018; Label: Upscale; Format: Digital download
Energize	Released: 8 February 2019; Label: Self-released; Format: Digital download
Dusk (featuring Nori)	Released: 22 November 2019; Label: Self-released; Format: Digital download
Invasion (with Prismatic)	Released: 3 July 2020; Label: Disciple Records; Format: Digital download
Earthwave (with Psyuri)	Released: 16 May 2025; Label: Ophelia Records; Format: Digital download
Emberwake	Released: 26 September 2025; Label: Self-released; Format: Digital download
Beyond Light	Released: 12 December 2025; Label: Self-released; Format: Digital download
Inverse	Released: 21 July 2026; Label: WAKAAN; Format: Digital download

=== Singles ===
Year	Title
2012	"The Essence"
2012	"Ennui"
2012	"Iteration"
2012	"The Seahorse VIP"
2012	"Partysaurus Overflow" (with BT)
2012	"Hypersphere VIP"
2013	"Lucky" (with Auratic and I.Y.F.F.E)
2013	"Sweet" (with Auratic and I.Y.F.F.E)
2013	"Crystal Mathematics" (featuring Shaz Sparks)
2013	"Flower of Life/First Blood" (with I.Y.F.F.E and Helicopter Showdown)
2013	"Halcyon" (with Fractal)
2013	"French Cigarette" (with I.Y.F.F.E)
2013	"Vapor"
2013	"Secret Weapon" (with Fractal)
2013	"Blue" (with Fractal)
2013	"Dreaming" (with Fractal)
2013	"Tendril" (with Collin McLoughlin)
2014	"Myst"
2014	"Follow You" (featuring Danyka Nadeau)
2014	"Reiteration"
2014	"Etheros"
2014	"Snowblind" (featuring Tasha Baxter)
2014	"Spawn" (with Fractal and Bird of Prey)
2014	"Crossroad" (featuring Danyka Nadeau)
2015	"Neptuna"
2015	"Serenata" (featuring Keeley)
2015	"Dream of Love" (with Heavy J, featuring Kenny Raye)
2015	"Inside" (featuring Danyka Nadeau)
2015	"Bigger Than Me" (with Tasha Baxter)
2015	"Atlantis"
2015	"Guardians" (featuring Fiora)
2015	"The Cliff"
2016	"Virgo"
2016	"Shlappy" (with Mr. Bill)
2016	"Return To Moonland"
2016	"Watership"
2017	"Blossom VIP"
2017	"Arise"
2017	"I Miss You" (featuring Kenny Raye)
2017	"Sea Rose" (with River Accorsi)
2017	"Yeah Boi" (with River Accorsi)
2017	"Impulse" (with Culprate)
2017	"Cosmoscope"
2017	"Goo Lagoon"
2017	"Lush" (with Last Heroes, featuring Holly Drummond)
2018	"The Zero Point" (featuring Holly Drummond)
2018	"Closer" (featuring Danyka Nadeau)
2018	"Cataclysm" (with Crystal Skies)
2018	"The Journey" (featuring Trove)
2018	"Only In A Dream" (with Nytrix)
2019	"Way Down" (with AMIDY, featuring Karra)
2019	"Eden" (featuring Danyka Nadeau)
2019	"Door House"
2019	"Funk Ain't Even" (featuring Nasty Purple)
2020	"Seraphim"
2020	"Always in a Nightmare" (featuring Nytrix)
2020	"Remember" (with Seven Lions and Crystal Skies)
2020	"Inflex"
2020	"Goodbye" (featuring NOHC)
2020	"Interstellar" (featuring Danyka Nadeau)
2020	"Answers"
2020	"Melt" (with Jeto featuring Cristina Soto)
2020	"Voidwalkers" (with Chime)
2020	"Alien Weapon"
2020	"Happy Where We Are" (with Tritonal featuring Dylan Matthew)
2020	"The Encryption"
2021	"The Way To Infinity"
2021	"Anywhere" (with Slander featuring Shybeast and Plya)
2021	"Was It You" (featuring Haliene)
2021	"Make You Cry" (with RUNN)
2021	"The Paper Owl" (featuring Arehlai)
2021	"Awaken" (featuring NOHC)
2022	"Cryptochrome"
2022	"A Million Miles" (featuring Diandra Faye)
2022	"Another Way" (with EMME)
2023	"The Other Side" (with Chime)
2023	"Quantum Level" (with Prismatic)
2023	"Save Our Souls" (with Lomaximus)
2023	"Bridges" (with Caitlin Linney)
2023	"Before You Leave" (with Cyazon & Tyler Graves)
2023	"Waiting" (with Crystal Skies)
2023	"Paradise" (with Derpcat & HA!L)
2023	"Catharsis" (with Skybreak & Olivver The Kid)
2024	"Turmoil" (with Blanke)
2024	"Empty Space" (with Evoke featuring Laura Brehm)
2024	"Edge Of Your Heart" (with Trufeelz)
2025	"Paradigm" (with Psyuri)
2025	"Heat" (with Psyuri)
2025	"while the time sleeps" (with Øneheart, Dean Korso, and leadwave)
2025	"Levity" (with Psyuri)
2025	"Snowblind VIP" (with Tasha Baxter)
2025	"Starflame"
2025	"Superluminal"
2026	"Shadow Away"
2026	"Enchanted"
2026	"Wings of Fire" (with Dani King and Lumasi)

=== Remixes ===
Year	Title
2011	Erasure - "I Lose Myself"
2012	Lightspeed Rescue - "Keep Your Body Moving"
2012	LMFAO - "Party Rock Anthem"
2012	BT, Nadia Ali and Arty - "Must Be the Love"
2012	Adventure Club - "Wait" (with I.Y.F.F.E)
2013	Singularity - "Breathe" (with Auratic and I.Y.F.F.E)
2013	Seven Lions featuring Fiora - "Days to Come" (with I.Y.F.F.E.)
2013	Dino Safari - "Ghost Named Charlie"
2013	ShockOne featuring Metrik and Kyza - "Lazerbeam"
2013	Singularity - "Alone" (with Fractal)
2013	Digital Eyes - "Samuel L. Jackson"
2013	Faruk Sabanci featuring Jaren - "Discover"
2013	BT featuring Matt Hales - "Surrounded"
2013	Prismatic - "Minty" (with Fractal)
2013	Scatman John - "Scatman" (with Savant, Fractal, and Prismatic)
2013	Blatwax - "Illuminate"
2014	Yanntek - "Moving On"
2014	Fractal - "Urchin"
2014	Manufactured Superstars featuring Jarvis Church - "Stay"
2014	Virtual Riot - "We're Not Alone"
2014	Akira Complex - "Odyssey"
2014	Revolvr and Genesis featuring Splitbreed - "Unstoppable"
2014	Juventa featuring Kelly Sweet - "Superhuman"
2014	Xilent featuring Sue Gerger - "The Place"
2015	Illenium and Said The Sky featuring Cristina Soto - "Painted White" (with Fractal)
2015	Infected Mushroom featuring Sasha Grey - "Fields of Grey"
2017	Psy-Fi - "Ecotone"
2018	APEK featuring Stassi - "Supernatural"
2018	Seven Lions and Jason Ross - "Ocean"
2018	Illenium and Kerli - "Sound Of Walking Away" (with Fractal)
2019	Seven Lions, Wooli, and Trivecta - "Island" (featuring Nevve)
2020	Slander and Said The Sky - "Potions" (featuring JT Roach)
2020	Man Cub, Apek, and Haliene - "Breathe In The Moment"
2020	Stonebank featuring Emel - "Be Alright"
2021	Tritonal and Cristina Soto - "Piercing Quiet"
2021	Gryffin - "Piece of Me" (featuring LOVA)
2024	Kosmonic - "Journey"

=== Other tracks ===
Year	Title	Released on
2012	"Techland"	SoundCloud
2012	"Deep In The Mist"	SoundCloud
2017	"Elemental"	SoundCloud

=== Production credits ===
Year	Title	Artist(s)	Album
2013	"Surrounded"	BT & Aqualung	A Song Across Wires
2013	"Letting Go"	BT, Fractal & JES	A Song Across Wires
2014	"Bailando (English Version)" (feat. Sean Paul, Descemer Bueno & Gente de Zona) (co-prod. Carlos Paucar, Markel Barsagaz & Fractal)	Enrique Iglesias	Sex and Love
