= Strangers (Seven Lions and Myon & Shane 54 song) =

Single by Seven Lions and Myon & Shane 54 featuring Tove Lo

from the album Worlds Apart
- Released: August 20, 2013
- Recorded: 2013
- Genre: Melodic dubstep
- Length: 3:24
- Label: Republic; Casablanca
- Songwriters: Jeffrey Montalvo; Mario Egeto; Ebba Nilsson

Seven Lions singles chronology
"Serpent of Old" (2013)	"Strangers" (2013)	"Don't Leave" (2014)

Tove Lo singles chronology
"Run on Love" (2013)	"Strangers" (2013)	"Out of Mind" (2013)

Lyric video
- "Strangers" on YouTube

"Strangers" is a song by American producer Seven Lions and Hungarian electronic music duo Myon & Shane 54 featuring vocals from Swedish singer-songwriter Tove Lo. American record label Republic Records released the song as part of the soundtrack for The Mortal Instruments: City of Bones on August 20, 2013. American record label Casablanca Records released it as a single on October 11, 2013. The song is the fourth track on Seven Lions' 2014 EP, Worlds Apart.

== Reception and release ==
Billboard called the song "a bright and swift tour-de-EDM-force with a touch of ethereal fantasy that owes a sense of agitation equally to 'Scary Monsters, Nice Sprites' and angsty teenage dreams." Vice Media called the 2014 re-release "more epic and lush" than the original. Complex used the term "trancestep" to describe the song, noting its mixture of dubstep, trance, and electro house, finalising their review by writing that the song "makes for an emotive concoction that not only leaves you inspired but transports you to a new world."

"Strangers" was ranked 9th on Buzzfeed's Top 25 Dance Records of 2013. In 2016, the song was listed as one of EDM Sauce's 59 Happiest EDM Songs.

On August 20, 2013, the song was released as a digital download on international digital stores through Republic Records and Casablanca Records, as well as being released through various music streaming services.

== Track listing ==
Digital download – Single
No.	Title	Length
1.	"Strangers"	3:24
Total length:		3:24

== Charts ==
=== Weekly charts ===
Chart (2013–2014)	Peak position
US Hot Dance/Electronic Songs (Billboard)	30

=== Year-end charts ===
Chart (2014)	Position
US Hot Dance/Electronic Songs (Billboard)	83

== Certifications ==
Region	Certification	Certified units/sales
United States (RIAA)	Gold	500,000^{‡}
^{‡} Sales+streaming figures based on certification alone.

== Release history ==
Region	Date	Format	Version	Label	Ref.
Worldwide	August 20, 2013	Digital download	"Strangers" (feat. Tove Lo)	Casablanca Records	
Worldwide	April 15, 2014	Digital download	Worlds Apart Version	Casablanca Records	
