= Worlds Apart (Seven Lions EP) =

EP by Seven Lions
- Released: April 29, 2014
- Length: 26:11
- Label: Casablanca Records
- Producer: Seven Lions

Seven Lions chronology
Days to Come (2012)	Worlds Apart (2014)	The Throes of Winter (2015)

Worlds Apart is an EP by American producer Seven Lions. Released on April 29, 2014 on Casablanca Records, the EP contains five tracks: "Don't Leave" with Ellie Goulding, "Worlds Apart" and "Keep It Close" with Estonian singer Kerli, "Nepenthe", and "Strangers". The album charted at No. 76 on The Billboard 200, and No. 2 on Top Electronic Albums in the US.

== Production ==
In an interview with Rolling Stone, Seven Lions described the EP as more experimental than his last EP, and that "the focus is on songwriting instead of pure dance-floor aggression." The EP contains five tracks: "Don't Leave" with Ellie Goulding, "Worlds Apart" and "Keep It Close" with Estonian singer Kerli, "Nepenthe", and an alternate version of "Strangers".

== Release and music video ==
External videos
- "World's Apart" Music Video feat. Kerli (Youtube, Aug 16, 2014)
- Worlds Apart EP Official Stream (Youtube, April 29, 2014)

The new version of "Strangers" was released on April 15, 2014 as a promo single for the EP, with Vice Media calling it "more epic and lush" than the original. Seven Lions' Worlds Apart EP was released on April 29, 2014 on Casablanca Records.

The album charted at No. 76 on The Billboard 200, and No. 2 on Top Electronic Albums in the US. "Don't Leave" entered the UK Singles Chart at number 141 on August 16, 2014.

On August 16 premiered also the music video for the Seven Lions and Kerli collaboration song Worlds Apart where Kerli plays a mermaid.

On 19 May 2017, a 'revised' single variant of "Don't Leave" featuring Ellie Goulding was released on iTunes.

== Reception ==
Professional ratings
Review scores
Source	Rating
AllMusic	3.5/5 stars
SputnikMusic	4.2/5 stars

The EP was largely well-received, with David Jeffries of AllMusic giving it a score of 3.5/5, and writing that it is "the EP where Jeff Montalvo's Seven Lions project spreads its wings, going beyond the usual bang and boom of EDM and letting the songs wander into whatever genres they care to explore." SputnikMusic gave it a score of 4.2/5, and wrote "Worlds Apart comes as that justification which we’ve been searching for the longest time. We finally have concrete evidence that brutal wobbles aren’t necessarily a hallmark of poor quality, thanks to the shockingly excellent five songs featured here."

== Track listing ==
No.	Title	Writer(s)	Length
1.	"Don't Leave" (featuring Ellie Goulding)	Jeffrey Montalvo; Ellie Goulding	6:02
2.	"Worlds Apart" (featuring Kerli)	Montalvo; Kerli Koiv	6:16
3.	"Nepenthe"	Montalvo	5:16
4.	"Strangers" (with Myon & Shane 54 featuring Tove Lo)	Montalvo; Mario Egeto; Tove Lo	3:24
5.	"Keep It Close" (featuring Kerli)	Montalvo; Koiv	5:12

== Charts ==
Chart (2014)	Peak position
US Billboard 200	76
US Dance/Electronic Albums	2

== Personnel ==
- Seven Lions - producer, writer
- Ellie Goulding - co-writer, vocalist
- Kerli Koiv - co-writer, vocalist
- Tove Lo - vocalist
- Mario Egeto - co-writer
- Myon - performer, co-writer
- Shane 54 - performer, co-writer
