= Ill-esha =

Canadian musician

ill-esha
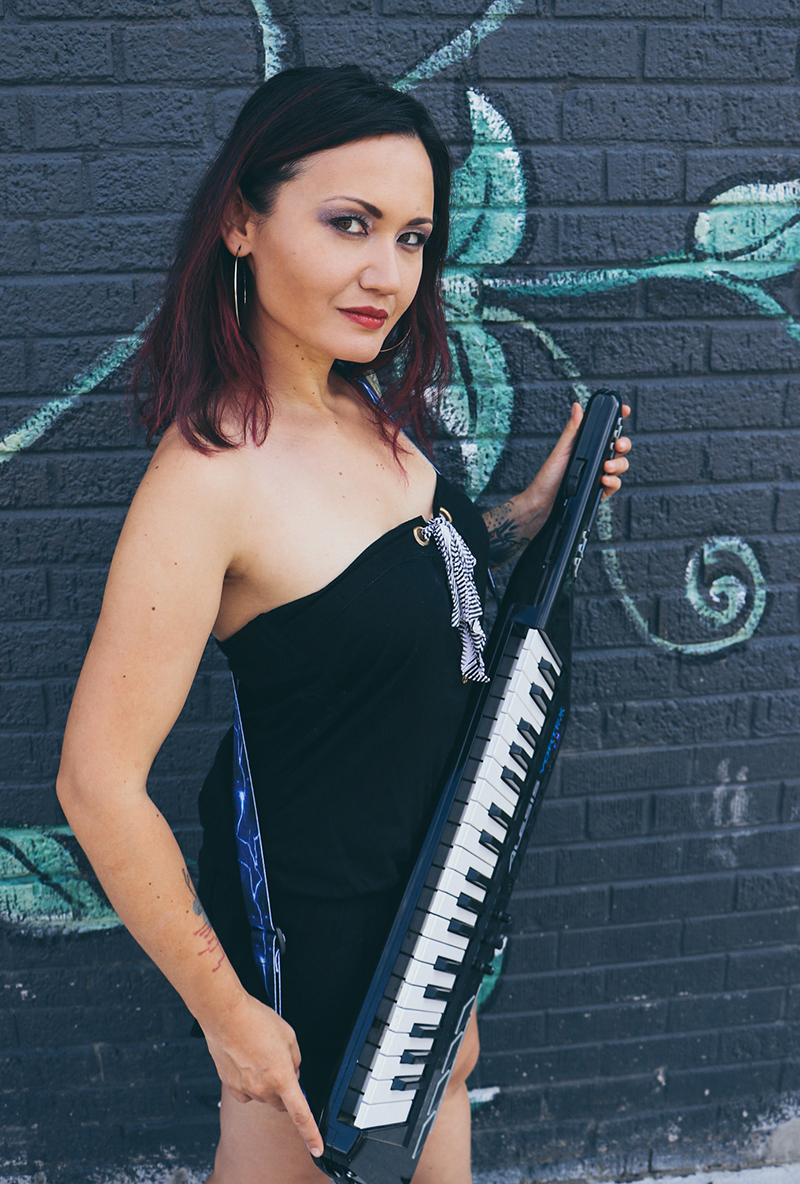

Background information
- Born: Elysha Zaide; October 31, 1982 (age 44)
- Origin: Vancouver, British Columbia, Canada
- Genres: Future bass, bass, dubstep, wonky, glitch hop, trap, hip hop, drum n' bass
- Instruments: Vocals, piano, keyboard, flute, vocal percussion, synthesizer, vocoder
- Years active: 1997–present
- Labels: Dub Police; Subway; Muti Music; Simplify; Gravitas Recordings
- Website: www.ill-esha.com

Elysha Zaide, known professionally by her artist name ill-esha (/ɪˈliːʃə/), is a Canadian electronic music artist, producer, singer, and DJ. She is known for her work in bass music, as well as for her performance style of singing and DJing simultaneously.

== Early life ==
Zaide began her career as a vocalist, MC, and drum and bass DJ in the late 1990s. She was the first female D&B performer to mix records, sing, and MC simultaneously. She developed a diverse style by doing so, blending electronic music genres such as broken beats, hip hop, breaks with D&B during her sets.

== Career ==
In 2001, Zaide's first 12" single "Social Skillz", made with producer Datcyde, was released on New York label Breakbeat Science. By 2007, she had played across North America, Asia and Europe, was featured on CBC Television, CTV, and MTV Canada, had built her own production studio, and had performed vocals on numerous releases with other D&B producers.

The year 2007 marked Zaide's advance into the professional world of electronic music production, as she completed her debut album Perfect Circuit. After having successful D&B releases, the full-length album was independently released under her own label, Elysha Zaide Music. A deviation from D&B, it encompassed an eclectic mix of electronica and pop inspired by Zaide's "myriad of music tastes, and love for technology and nature". Performed with a five-piece live band, Zaide fronted the group with vocals and live electronics using a laptop and synthesizers. The same year, the band debuted at the New Music West, Soundwave, and Victoria Electronic Music Festivals. Perfect Circuit was well received by the electronic music community, and the album's single "Broken Windows" was a finalist in the 2007 John Lennon Songwriting Contest.

Increasingly inspired by dubstep and glitch hop, Zaide began producing music more synonymous with the glitch genre in 2008, and founded the Glitch Hop Forum with collaborator Dewey db. They co-produced the track "H.A.A.R.P", which was released in 2009 on Muti Music. It hit No. 3 on Beatport electronica downloads, and stayed in the top 10 for several months.

Exploring her love of 2-step and future garage, Zaide diversified further. In 2010, she was signed to Haunted Audio and Daly City Records. She has several single releases on Haunted Audio, and her second album Circadian Rhythms was released on Daly City Records the same year. The album held a spot in the top 10 monthly downloads on Addictech for December 2010. Sampling Daft Punk's soundtrack for the movie Tron: Legacy, she released a bootleg "Purple Legacy", which went to No. 1 on SoundCloud and garnered almost 15,000 plays in four days, before being removed due to a copyright conflict with Disney.

Collaborating for years with Bay Area Dubstep pioneer Antiserum, their mix of purple and hard dubstep reached the international market, with two vinyl releases "Zephyr" and "Lightning/Overflow" released on European labels Dub Police and Subway.

Zaide subsequently released several glitch/dubstep EPs on San Francisco-based Muti Music, and Austin-based label Gravitas Recordings., as well as being featured on acclaimed producer Starkey's boutique label Seclusiasis. More recently, she has released independently with the support of collectives and blogs such as Hebinomichi, Run the Trap, NEST HQ, Earmilk, and Phuture Collective.

== Scoring ==
=== Games ===
In 2011, Zaide worked with indie game developers VectorBloom to produce an original electronica dubstep music score titled "Kaleidoscope", composed for Big Top Ballet, a stylized art game for iOS, Android, OS X and Chrome. Zaide has also provided the music for the game "Hack Run".

=== Film ===
In 2018, Zaide scored the documentary "Beauty", directed by Christina Willings, for the National Film Board of Canada Documentary. She also scored "Sandra Oh: Inspiration", an NFB tribute to the actress directed by Karen Lam, released in 2019.

== Discography ==
=== Albums ===
- Perfect Circuit (2007)
- Circadian Rhythms (Daly City, 2010)
- Reverie (Muti Music, 2011)
- Elusive History (Simplify, 2011)
- Imaginary Friends (Muti Music, 2012)
- Whiplash Recovery (Gravitas Recordings, 2013)
- Altitude Sickness (Muti Music, 2013)
- Open Heart Surgery (Gravitas recordings, 2014)
- Open Heart Surgery: The Remixes (Gravitas recordings, 2014)
- Autopilot (with K.E. on the Track (Bandcamp, 2014)
- Hyperbolic Space Crochet (Seclusiasis, 2015)
- Hyperbolic Space Crochet: The Remixes (Seclusiasis, 2015)
- Wordless (Bandcamp, 2016)
- Antarctica (Phuture Collective/Play It Louder/SoundCloud, 2018)
- Illusions (Muti Music, 2019)
- Songs from the Sweat Shed (Bandcamp, 2020)
- Unleashed (Muti Music, 2020)
- The Living Atlantis (Outlaw Ocean Music Project, 2020)
- Simplications EP w/ K+Lab (Westwood Recordings, 2021)

=== Remixes ===
- Subvert: "Speaker Humpin'" (ill-esha remix feat. MC ThinkTank) (Muti Music, 2010)
- Freddy Todd: "Blowin' Good" (ill-esha remix) (Car Crash Set, 2010)
- Mochipet: "Whomp-a-saurus Sex" (ill-esha remix) (Daly City, 2011)
- Who Cares: "These Three Words" (ill-esha remix) (Simplify, 2011)
- +verb: "Cough" (ill-esha remix) (Muti Music, 2011)
- Chron4 ft Audio Angel: "Get Lost" (ill-esha remix) (1320, 2011)
- Ayla Nereo: "By Night" (ill-esha remix) (Jumpsuit Records, 2015)
- Aceyalone: "Almost There" (ill-esha remix) (Sony Red, 2017)

=== Singles ===
- "Social Skillz" with Datcyde (Breakbeat Science, 2001)
- "Social Skillz" Garon Remix (Taciturn, 2002)
- "The Modern Divide" with Revolution Void (as Elysha Zaide, 2004)
- "Gemini Soul" with Jay Tripwire (Nordic Trax, 2007)
- "Stealth" with Aperture (Outsider UK, 2007)
- "Universe" with TheEgo and DJ Roots (BluSaphir, 2007)
- "Coward" (on Knowledge Magazine Cover CD, Acoustixx Journeyz, 2008)
- "Point of No Return" with Contour (Intrinsic, 2008)
- "Not the Way" with Castor (Force Recordings, 2009)
- "Save Me" with Madmen & Poets, Soulgrifter (Fokuz, 2009)
- "Sin City" featuring Ozzius Atreides (Woofer Cookers, 2009)
- "Kitchen Sync" (Woofer Cookers, 2009)
- "H.A.A.R.P." (with Dewey dB on Acid Crunk Vol. 2) (Muti Music, 2009)
- "Snow-country Child / Daydreamer" (Haunted Audio, 2010)
- "Risky Rutabaga" (Woofer Cookers, 2010)
- "The Grande attack Dunk" (Emergency Broadcast System, 2010)
- "Kitsch Meets Glitch" (with Kitsch Palace) (Street Ritual, 2011)
- "Meeting Up With Producer Friends on Mountainsides" (with Freddy Todd, Elfkowitz & Joe Mousepad, featured on Freddy Todd's "Neon Spectacle Operator" LP) (Simplify, 2011)
- "Black Ice EP: Part 1 North American Excursion" (Haunted Audio, 2011)
- "Black Ice EP: Part 2 European Excursion" (Haunted Audio, 2011)
- "Cherry Blossoms EP" (featuring remixes by TrillBass, Mindelixir, Dan Wall & Ron Gee, Splatinum) (True Score Theory, 2011)
- "Zephyr" (with Antiserum) (Dub Police, 2011)
- "Lightning/Overflow" (with Antiserum) (Subway Music, 2012)
- "Treasures" (featuring Chadio and Damon Morris, featured on "EVD Bass") (East Van Digital, 2011)*"Fossils" (with jOBOT, featured on "Disciples of Headtron") (Muti Music, 2012)
- "War Cod" (with Opiuo) (Addictech, 2012)
- "Wanderlust" (featuring Zipporah) (Critical Beats, 2012)
- "Chicken Scratch" (featured on the Joe Mousepad vs Glitch Hop EP) (Street Ritual, 2012)
- "Blazed EP" (featuring remixes by Standard&Push, Buzzwak, Toprek, Zonatash) (R3GMA, 2012)
- "Love at 432" (LostinSound.org, 2013)
- "We Heard" (collab with kLL sMTh for the BlackMarketArmoire Collective) (The Untz, 2013)
- "Galactic Halo" (Slit Jockey "Choice Cuts" Compilation)
- "Dirty Mind" (East Van Digital EVDBASS3 Compilation)
- "Signs" (Hebinomichi Vol 4 Compilation, 2015)
- "Real Life" (Unspeakable Records Vol 2 Compilation, 2015)
- "Brave" (w/ SteLouse) (Taste&Tone/Atlantic, 2015)
- "Ghostwriter" (Hebinomichi Vol 3 Compilation, 2016)
- "Coraline" (Seclusiasis 130 BPM Compilation)
- "Cloud Sublime" (with option4) (Kitsune, 2016)
- "Why?" (with Oksami) (Hotboi Records, 2017)
- "Your Skies" (with Venza) (Swisted Selections, 2017)
- "Hologram Midnight" (SoundCloud, premiered via NEST HQ, 2017)
- "Into the Sun" (with nine plus) (Phuture Collective, 2018)
- "Feel What I Feel" (with frost) (Big Beat/Atlantic, 2019)
- "Sideways" (with 90five) (Distrokid, 2020)
- "Live Again" (with The Burner Brothers) (Patrol the Skies, 2020)
- "Endless" (with ill.Gates, Andrew Huang (musician), Ludlow) (Producer Dojo, 2020)
- "Isolation" (with Stereotype) (Lowly Palace, 2020)
- "Photograph" (Distrokid, 2020)
- "Summer is Calling" (as part of "the group") (Ahead of Our Time/Ninja Tune, 2021)
- "Call You out" (with frost) (Monstercat, 2021)
- "Opus" (with frost) (Gravitas, 2021)
- "Sonata of Solitude" (Ninja Tune, 2021)
- "Space" (with No Mana) (Monstercat, 2022)
- "Haze" (with Mr Bill & Underbelly) (Monstercat, 2024)
