= Two Fold Pt. 2 =

Studio album by Haywyre
- Released: 8 February 2016
- Recorded: 2015–16
- Genres: House; future bass; dubstep; glitch hop
- Length: 29:17
- Label: Monstercat
- Producer: Martin Vogt

Haywyre chronology
Two Fold Pt. 1 (2014)	Two Fold Pt. 2 (2016)

Singles from Two Fold Pt. 2
- 1. "Endlessly" Released: 15 December 2015; 2. "Do You Don't You" Released: 1 February 2016; 3. "I Am You" Released: 8 February 2016

Two Fold Pt. 2 is the sixth studio album by Lafayette-based electronic producer Martin Vogt, commonly known as his stage name, Haywyre. The album was released by Canadian record label Monstercat on 8 February 2016.

== Background and composition ==
Vogt first started producing Two Fold Pt. 2 in mid-2015, roughly a year after the release of his previous album, Two Fold Pt. 1. Vogt aimed to musically represent the concept of duality further compared to Two Fold Pt. 1 as he felt that the album could have done better at representing the concept behind the album and aimed to do so for Two Fold Pt. 2.

A North-American tour titled "Two Fold Pt. 2 Tour" was debuted on 11 February 2016. When speaking of the tour, Vogt stated:

One of my goals for the next year is to focus heavily on bridging the gap between the production and the performance of my music. I’d like to imagine that I would find a way to build my sets and music in general around my love for keyboard improvisation without losing fidelity. Hopefully, through the Two Fold Pt. 2 tour, I will come closer to realizing this goal.

== Reception and release ==
Two Fold Pt. 2 was released on 8 February 2016 to positive reviews. Chad Downs of Raver Rafting described the album as "as harmonious, balanced, and enjoyable as fans had anticipated". Matthew Meadow of YourEDM praised the album, stating "It’s difficult to really compare one part of the Two Fold series to the other… so I won’t. All I will say is that Pt. 2 is a phenomenally well-produced album and a perfect follow-up to one of our favourite albums of 2014." Michael Sundius of Billboard stated "Forward-thinking, yet conscious of the past, his work as Haywyre is both innovative and tasteful."

== Track listing ==
No.	Title	Length
1.	"I Am Me"	2:09
2.	"I Am You"	3:49
3.	"Restraint"	0:47
4.	"Impulse"	3:15
5.	"Do You Don't You"	4:35
6.	"Moment"	3:12
7.	"Memory"	3:38
8.	"Transient"	2:53
9.	"Endlessly"	4:59
Total length:		29:17

== Charts ==
Chart (2016)	Peak position
US Dance/Electronic Albums (Billboard)	13
