= Days to Come (EP) =

EP by Seven Lions
- Released: October 16, 2012
- Genre: Dubstep
- Length: 20:09
- Label: Owsla
- Producer: Seven Lions

Seven Lions chronology
Polarize (2012)	Days to Come (2012)	Worlds Apart (2014)

Days to Come is the second extended play (EP) by American DJ and record producer Seven Lions. Released on October 16, 2012, via Owsla, it consists of four songs. The EP charted on multiple Billboard charts such as Dance/Electronic Albums and Heatseekers Albums.

== Background ==
The EP was described as "representing the blossoming talent of a precocious producer who is finally starting to receive the attention he deserves." Speaking about the EP's creative process, Seven Lions said "It's pretty much the same process with every song. I write very linear, start with the intro/theme and then work through it from there. I tend to spend 3–4 weeks on one song. This year has been a big transition for me and I think that comes out a lot in the diversity of the EP." Sputnikmusic called the EP an attempt by Seven Lions to expand his sound but "ends up with more of the same."

== Track listing ==
No.	Title	Length
1.	"Days to Come" (featuring Fiora)	4:44
2.	"The Truth"	5:32
3.	"Fractals"	4:59
4.	"She Was" (featuring Birds of Paradise)	4:54

== Charts ==
Chart (2012)	Peak position
US Top Dance/Electronic Albums (Billboard)	10
US Heatseekers Albums (Billboard)	13

== Remix contest ==
After the release of the album, OWSLA hosted a remix contest of the title track, "Days To Come". The winning remix was done by a pair of artists, Au5 and I.Y.F.F.E.
