= Two Fold Pt. 1 =

Studio album by Haywyre
- Released: 31 March 2014
- Recorded: 2013–14
- Genre: Glitch hop; drumstep; house; future bass; UK garage
- Length: 33:37
- Label: Monstercat
- Producer: Martin Vogt

Haywyre chronology
Infinite (2012)	Two Fold Pt. 1 (2014)	Two Fold Pt. 2 (2016)

Singles from Two Fold Pt. 1
- 1. "The Schism" Released: 9 March 2014; 2. "Sculpted" Released: 24 March 2014; 3. "Doppelgänger" Released: 31 March 2014

Two Fold Pt. 1 is the fifth studio album by Lafayette-based electronic producer Martin Vogt, commonly known as his stage name, Haywyre. The album was released by Canadian record label Monstercat on 31 March 2014.

== Background and composition ==
In December 2014, Vogt announced a North American tour entitled "Two Fold Tour" which planned to debut on 23 January 2015. When announcing the tour, Vogt stated:

If there's one aspect of my music career that I really want to explore a bit more heavily, it's my live performances. Playing the keyboard is not just a vital part of my production, but also my sets; I think it's important to showcase that quality. Not to mention, my jazz roots are mad at me for not playing out my licks live more often; It's not hard to see why I'm so excited about doing my first solo tour.

Two Fold Pt. 2 was released in 2016 as a follow-up to Two Fold Pt. 1. Two Fold Pt. 2 aimed to musically represent the concept of duality further as Vogt felt that Two Fold Pt. 1 could have done better at musically representing the concept behind the album.

== Reception and release ==
Two Fold Pt. 1 was released to positive reviews. Tyler Trew of YourEDM stated "The first ever Monstercat LP was not only ingeniously methodical in its creation, but it's marketed unraveling showed prowess over most else I have seen", further stating "once you listen to what Two Fold Part I has to offer, your mind will sway, even if it's slightly, towards agreeing with the claim. The level of musicality in the LP is unparalleled; Martin extended himself to the furthest reaches of existence and back as a producer, and more importantly as a musician, to cultivate something that is undeniably extraordinary." Sputnikmusic gave Two Fold Pt. 1 a 3.5 out of 5, stating "Consisting of some rather unique talent to his credit and excellent mixture of different sounds, Two Fold is an inventive blend of music and a curious case for what is to come for the future of both Haywyre, and electronica in general". EDM Sauce placed Two Fold Pt. 1 as the 5th best album of 2014, above Money Sucks, Friends Rule by Dillon Francis but below while(1<2) by deadmau5. Your EDM placed Two Fold Pt. 1 as the 9th best album of 2014, stating "Martin Vogt has been studying piano since the age of six, and his classical training is reflected within his music that contains some of the most beautiful melodic progressions found in EDM today".

== Track listing ==
No.	Title	Length
1.	"Prologue" (Part One)	2:10
2.	"The Schism"	5:20
3.	"Dichotomy" (Soft Mix)	3:56
4.	"Sculpted"	4:03
5.	"Doppelgänger"	4:35
6.	"Permutate" (with Zeros)	4:05
7.	"Time" (featuring CoMa)	5:31
8.	"Voice of Reason" (with Galimatias)	3:56
Total length:		33:37
