= Motion Notion =

Annual Canadian dance festival

Motion Notion is an annual underground electronic dance music and transformational festival located in the Rocky Mountains near Golden, BC, Canada. Started in 2000, it is one of Western Canada's longest running annual outdoor electronic dance music festivals. Originally a single night event, the festival has grown to be a four night event, usually held over a weekend towards the end of July. The event features three festival sponsored stages (The Temple, Cabana, and Spectrum) and allows for up to four independently operated and funded stages.

== Music ==
Motion Notion formed its roots in the rave and festival scene with psychedelic trance, techno, house music, drum and bass, downtempo, dubstep, and breakbeat.

List of some of the headlining artists who have performed at Motion Notion:

- Infected Mushroom
- Shpongle
- The Crystal Method
- Amon Tobin
- Dirtyphonics
- Excision (musician)
- Datsik (musician)
- Noisia
- David Tipper

== History ==
The first Motion Notion was held in a warehouse in Calgary, Alberta, in 2000.

Partly as a result of the City of Calgary's extended dance bylaw, and a change in direction to host outdoor events rather than indoor, Motion Notion moved out of the city to a rural setting.

Subsequent years saw the festival move to various sites around Western Alberta, including Nojack, Evansburg and Drayton Valley.

The festival then moved to Golden, BC, which would remain its home for many years.

In 2018, organizers announced the festival would be moving to Merritt, BC, where it was held that year. For various reasons the festival was put on hold and then cancelled in 2019.

== Location ==
The 2018 Motion Notion festival was held on the Coldwater Fields Festival Grounds located in Merritt, British Columbia.
