= Mochipet =

- Born: David Wang; January 12, 1980 (age 46); Taiwan
- Origin: Daly City, California
- Genres: Alternative hip-hop, electronic
- Occupation: Producer
- Years active: 2002-present
- Labels: Daly City Records, BPitch Control, Death$ucker, Peace Off, Violent Turd, Automation Records
- Website: mochipet.bandcamp.com

David Wang, better known by his stage name Mochipet, is a Taiwanese American record producer. His recordings have been released on multiple record labels such as Death$ucker, Peace Off, and Violent Turd. He is also the owner of Daly City Records.

== Career ==
Mochipet released the album, Combat, in 2004. It was followed by Uzumaki. In 2008, he released Microphonepet, an album consisting of tracks he has recorded with underground rappers for five years. Alan Ranta of Tiny Mix Tapes gave the album a favorable review, describing it as "one of the strongest hip-hop albums of 2008". KEXP-FM chose "Sharp Drest", a song off of the album, as their Song of the Day on June 23, 2008.

== Discography ==
=== Albums ===
- Randbient Works 2002 (2002)
- Combat (2004)
- Uzumaki (2004)
- Feel My China (2005)
- Disko Donkey (2006)
- Girls Love Breakcore (2007)
- Feel My China II (2008)
- Microphonepet (2008)
- Microphonepet Remixed (2008)
- Master P on Atari (2009)
- Bunnies & Muffins (2009)
- Master P on Atari: Transformed Volume 2 (2010)
- Hello My Name Is (2011)
- 10 Reasons to Love Hate Dubstep (2011)
- Chicxulub (2011)
- Mochipet Is Evil (2012)
- Godzilla Rehab Center (2013)
- Rawr Means I Love You (2013)
- Kaiju Pet (2013)

=== EPs ===
- Electric Saki House (2004)
- Recored (sic) (2009)
- Retweaked (2009)
- Rehyped (2009)
- Rebootied (2009)
- Cowgirls Gets the Pets (2010)

=== Singles ===
- Nelly vs. Venetian Snares (2003)
- My Gucci Chainsaw Ass Clap Attack (2006)
- Godzilla New Year (2009)
- Whomp-A-Saurus Sex (2011)

=== Remixes ===
- Exillon - "Nuclear Dolphin Jungle" from Prequiem (2005)
- Otto von Schirach - "Earjuice Synthesis (Earjuice Daly City Freestyle Hyphee Yay Area Jam)" from Armpit Buffet (2005)
- Kraddy - "Android Porn (Mochipet 'Godzillaporn' Remix)" from Android Porn Remixes (2010)
- The Bins - "Inspiration (Mochipet's Wormhole Generator Remix)" from Inspiration (2011)
- Kid 606 - "Ejaculazer Tag (Mochipet Remix)" from Ejaculazer Tag (2012)
- Restiform Bodies - "Bobby Trendy Addendum (Mochipet Remix)" from TV Loves You Back Remixes (2013)
