= TourRadar =

Travel company

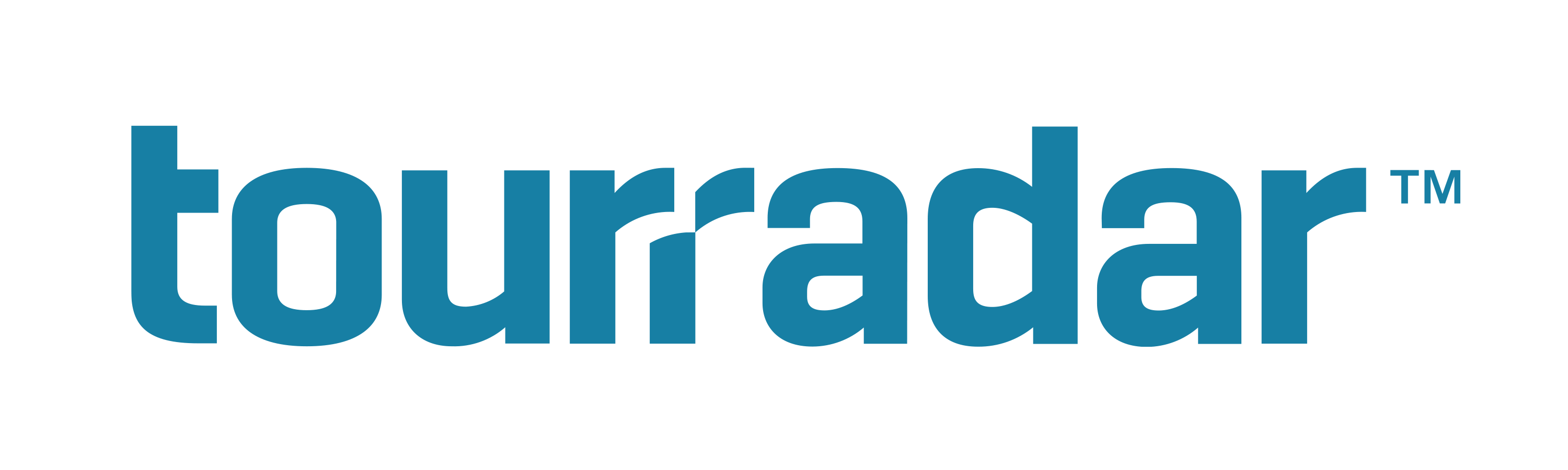
- Industry: Tourism
- Founded: 2010; 16 years ago
- Founder: Travis Pittman, Shawn Pittman
- Headquarters: Vienna, Austria
- Number of locations: Vienna, Toronto, Brisbane
- Area served: Global
- Products: Multi-day group tours
- Services: Internet booking engine
- Number of employees: 200
- Website: www.tourradar.com

TourRadar is a privately held global company headquartered in Vienna, Austria that operates an online marketplace and internet booking engine specializing in multi-day tours.

== Product overview ==
TourRadar's global inventory includes over 40,000 different multi-day tours including those related to adventure, food, river-cruising, hiking and trekking, and several other types of travel styles.

== History ==
Founded in 2010, TourRadar was created by Australian brothers Travis and Shawn Pittman and was inspired by their social travel website BugBitten. TourRadar was spun-out of Bugbitten in June 2010 and has since grown to include the ability to find, book and review multi-day tours.

In June 2013, TourRadar announced a round of angel funding from investors including Erik Blachford, the former CEO of Expedia.

In May 2014, TourRadar appeared on the Austrian version of Dragons' Den and secured US$500,000 in funding led by former chief executives from Expedia and the HolidayCheck Group, as well as funding from a private Austrian investment company.

In September 2015, TourRadar launched in North America, establishing an office in Toronto, Canada, and named Christian Wolters, former VP of Sales and Marketing at Intrepid Travel, as the company's North America Managing Director.

In May, 2016, TourRadar raised $6 million in Series A funding. In September of the same year, the company announced that it would be adding river cruising to its catalogue of bookable tours.

In October 2017, TourRadar completed a Series B funding round of $10 million. Later that year, TourRadar was named one of the top three start-ups in Austria by Trend.

In June 2018, TourRadar raised $50 million in Series C funding, led by Silicon Valley growth venture capital firm, TCV, who previously backed Expedia and Airbnb. The funding also included participation from existing investors Cherry Ventures, Endeit Capital, Hoxton Ventures and Speedinvest.

In February 2019, TourRadar launched a contest called Tour the World which included a global search for two strangers willing to travel the world together for 50 days. The winners had their experiences documented by a film crew while they traveled to five different continents.

In the same year, TourRadar's Melissa Lopez received the Gold Stevie Award at the Stevie Awards for Women in Business. TourRadar's Cruise Team also received the Gold Stevie Award for 2018 Global Sales Team of the Year at the 2019 Stevie Awards.

In 2020, TourRadar began offering its services in German.

In 2021, TourRadar announced its Adventure Booking Platform category which allows travel agents to earn a commission on multi-day tours. TourRadar also formed a global partnership with Flight Centre Travel Group. As a result of this partnership, TourRadar's inventory and online bookings were integrated into Flight Centre's Helio agent platform.

TourRadar also formed a global partnership with Flight Centre Travel Group. As a result of this partnership, TourRadar's inventory and online bookings were integrated into Flight Centre's Helio agent platform.

In 2022, TourRadar formed a partnership with Flight Centre to integrate its inventory and bookable online content into Flight Centre's Helio agent platform via API. In the same year, TourRadar held its second annual Adventure Together conference in Vienna, Austria.

At the 2023 Stevie Awards, TourRadar's Talent Cycle & Skill Development team received a Bronze Stevie Award in the category of Great Employers. In October 2023, TourRadar partnered with Local Adventures and TRAVLR for improvements to the company's business-to-business tool for travel booking. TourRadar also organized the 2023 Adventure Together conference, which included GuideTogether, a training program developed in collaboration with TripSchool and the Global Guide Alliance.

In 2024, TourRadar announced the return of its Guide of the Year Awards for tour guides worldwide.

In June 2025, TourRadar launched TourRadar Moments, becoming a pioneer in the organized adventure industry by introducing a new way for travelers to discover, share, and book multi-day tours through user-generated short-form videos and photos within its mobile app.

In the same year, TourRadar launched RISE, a $1 million partner fund empowering travelers, creators, guides, and agents through commissions, paid collaborations, and exclusive experiences, marking a shift toward community-led Social Commerce in organized adventures.

== Offices ==
TourRadar has offices in Brisbane, Australia; Vienna, Austria; and Toronto, Canada.

== Awards ==
- 2023 Stevie Awards – Bronze Stevie Award in the category of Great Employers.
- 2023 Skift IDEA Awards – Winner in the Problem Solvers: Business Outcomes category.
- 2023 TravelTech Breakthrough Awards – Travel Tour Platform of the Year.
- 2023 Internet Advertising Competition (IAC) Awards – Best Online Travel Campaign for Astounding Portugal. An Adventure to Remember, in collaboration with Visit Portugal.
