= Gravitas Recordings =

American record label

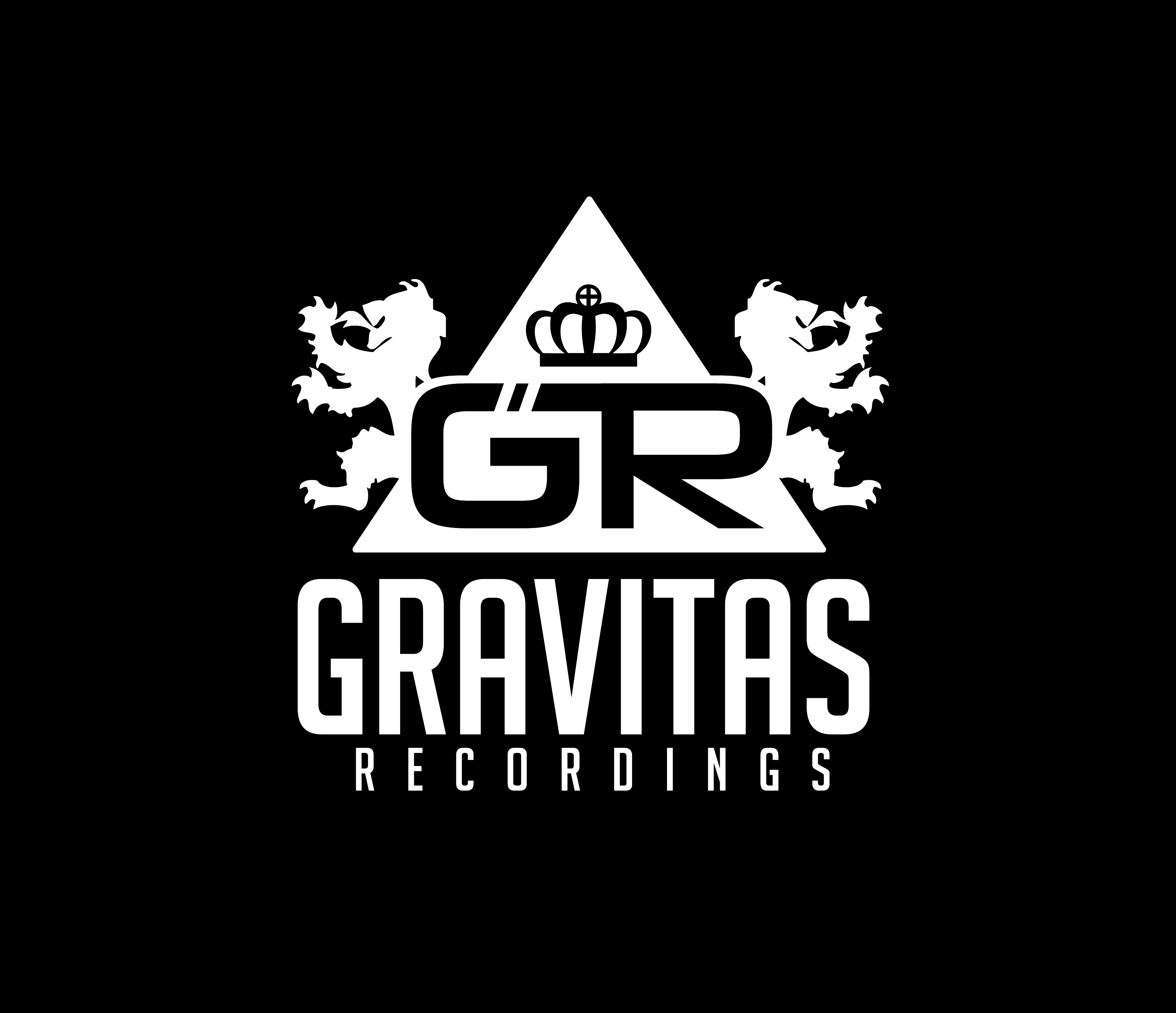
- Founded: 2011
- Founder: Jesse Brede
- Distributor(s): Symphonic Distribution
- Genre: Electronic
- Country of origin: United States
- Location: Austin, Texas
- Official website: gravitasrecordings.com

Gravitas Recordings (also called Gravitas Music) is an American record label founded in 2011 by Jesse Brede. It is an Austin, Texas based record label and creative collective that serves as a platform for international artists to showcase their work. The mantra of the multi-genre electronic music label, "doing good with good music," has become a way of life. Since its inception in 2011, Gravitas boasts over 205 releases from a selection of producers worldwide.

Fueled by its passion to give talented musicians and visualists a platform to share their work, the company also simultaneously strives to give back to the community by raising money for various charitable causes through compilation albums. Beyond its philanthropic initiatives, the brand's focus is to release quality music that is accessible to anyone via Gravitas' signature "pay-what-you-want" delivery model. Gravitas was one of the Roman virtues, along with pietas, dignitas and virtus. It may be translated variously as weight, seriousness, dignity, or importance, and connotes a certain substance or depth of personality.

== Charitable works ==
Neurovation

The compilation "Neurovation" was released in September 2012. The album featured various artists such as Gramatik, Mochipet, EdIT and more. All sales from the proceeds of this album went to the non-profit organization "Charity: Water".

Beat ALS Volume 1

In 2014, Gravitas assembled another compilation featuring new music from world-renowned artists such as BT, Bassnectar, Richie Hawtin, and John Acquaviva to name a few. Profits from sales benefited "Every90Minutes", an organization that raises money and awareness for ALS or "Lou Gehrigs disease"

DEFCON Soundtrack, Vol. 20-24

Gravitas has released the soundtrack for DEF CON every year since 2012. Proceeds go to the activist non-profit organization "Electronic Frontier Foundation" that advocates digital rights.

Circulate, Vol 1: Curated by David Starfire & SOOHAN

Gravitas released a world bass compilation with David Starfire and SOOHAN in 2019 to raise money for Beyond the Grade, an Austin-based non-profit that offers music education for underserved children. 100% of net proceeds were donated.

== Awards ==
- 2019 - "Label of the Year"
- 2014 - "Most Giving Label"
- 2013 - "Label of the Year" and "Breakthrough Label of the Year"

== Artists and alumni ==
- Active Artists
  - Amp Live
  - AHEE
  - Au5
  - Bassline Drift
  - Brede
  - Cloudchord
  - CloZee
  - Chamberlain
  - COFRESI
  - Cristina Soto
  - Cualli
  - David Starfire
  - DISSOLV
  - Dubvirus
  - Dysphemic
  - Edamame
  - Esseks
  - Equanimous
  - Father Bear
  - Fractal Sky
  - Govinda
  - Grand Tapestry
  - High Step Society
  - Illustrated
  - Josh Teed
  - JPod
  - Lil Fish
  - Megan Hamilton
  - MORiLLO
  - Mr. Bill
  - Of The Trees
  - Psy Fi
  - Psymbionic
  - Savej
  - Somatoast
  - SOOHAN
  - Vokab Kompany
  - VOLO
  - Wolf-e-wolf
  - Zebbler Encanti Experience
- Alumni
  - Supersillyus
  - Said the Sky
  - Illenium
  - Electrocado
  - Space Jesus
  - Minnesota
  - Ill-esha
  - Soulacybin
  - Mindex
  - Kermode
  - AMB
  - Unlimited Gravity
  - Marvel Years
  - Devin Riggins
  - The Digital Connection
  - Soulular
  - Perkulat0r
  - Metranohm

== Charity compilation artists ==
- Bassnectar
- edIT
- Machinedrum
- Dub FX
- Matthew Dear
- Gramatik
- Mochipet
- John Acquaviva
- Julian Gray
- Nicolas Jaar
- Richie Hawtin
- Tritonal
- Kraddy
- Starkey
- Opiuo
- DJ Madd
- Buku
- ill.Gates
- Tritonal
