= List of dubstep musicians =

This is a list of dubstep musicians. This includes artists who have either been very important to the genre or have had a considerable amount of exposure (such as those that have been on a major label). This list does not include little-known local artists. Artists are listed by the first letter in their name (not including the words "a", "an", or "the").

== List ==
=== 0–9 ===
- 12th Planet
- 16bit
- 2562

=== A ===
- Ace Aura
- Adventure Club
- Alvin Risk
- Au5

=== B ===
- Barely Alive
- Bassnectar
- Bear Grillz
- Benga
- Black Tiger Sex Machine
- James Blake
- Blackmill
- Borgore
- Boxcutter
- Breakage
- Bro Safari
- Burial

=== C ===
- Caspa
- Chase & Status
- Chime
- Alex Clare
- Clubroot
- Crankdat
- Crizzly

=== D ===
- Datsik
- Delta Heavy
- Digital Mystikz
- Dillon Francis
- Dirtyphonics
- Distance
- DJ Chef
- DJ Fresh
- DJ SFR
- Doctor P
- Dodge & Fuski
- Dog Blood
- Drop the Lime

=== E ===
- El-B
- Emalkay
- Ephixa
- Eptic
- Excision

=== F ===
- Figure
- Flux Pavilion
- Foreign Beggars
- Fox Stevenson
- FS
- FuntCase

=== G ===
- Gammer
- Ganja White Night
- The Gaslamp Killer
- Geiom
- Gemini
- Getter
- Ghastly
- Jon Gooch
- Goth-Trad

=== H ===
- Mick Harris
- Hatcha
- Haywyre
- Herobust
- Horsepower Productions

=== I ===
- Ikonika
- ILLENIUM
- Ill-esha
- Infected Mushroom

=== J ===
- Jack Beats
- Jakwob
- James Blake
- Jauz
- JDevil
- Joker
- Joy Orbison
- Juakali

=== K ===
- Kahn
- Katy B
- Kayzo
- KDrew
- Killbot
- Kill the Noise
- Klaypex
- Knife Party
- KOAN Sound
- Kode9
- Kompany
- Krewella
- Kromestar
- Kuuro

=== L ===
- Labrinth
- Lindsey Stirling
- Liquid Stranger
- Loefah

=== M ===
- The M Machine
- Magnetic Man
- Kevin Martin
- Martyn
- Modestep
- Moore Kismet
- Mount Kimbie
- Mr FijiWiji
- MRK1
- Mt Eden
- Must Die!
- Muzz

=== N ===
- Navene-k
- Nero
- NGHTMRE
- Noisestorm
- Joe Nice
- Noisia

=== O ===
- Omar LinX

=== P ===
- Panda Eyes
- Pegboard Nerds
- Pinch
- Plastician
- Porter Robinson

=== R ===
- REZZ
- Riot Ten
- Rusko

=== S ===
- Savant
- SBTRKT
- Scuba
- Seven Lions
- ShockOne
- Ivan Shopov
- Silkie
- SKisM
- Skream
- Skrillex
- SLANDER
- Slushii
- SNAILS
- Space Laces
- Sub Focus
- Subtronics
- Sullivan King
- SVDDEN DEATH

=== T ===
- Truth

=== U ===
- Unicorn Kid

=== V ===
- Vaccine
- Various
- Vex'd
- Virtual Riot

=== W ===
- Watch The Duck
- Wooli
- Jamie Woon

=== Z ===
- Zedd
- Zed Bias
- Zeds Dead
- Zomby
- Zomboy

== See also ==
- Lists of musicians
