= Big Apple Records =

Record shop and label in Croydon influential to Dubstep music (1992-2004)

Coordinates: 51°22′23″N 0°6′5″W

- Founded: 1992; 34 years ago
- Founder: John-Paul Kennedy
- Defunct: 2004
- Status: Defunct
- Genre: Dubstep; Garage; Jungle
- Country of origin: United Kingdom
- Location: Croydon

Big Apple Records was a record shop and label in Croydon, South London that opened in 1992 and closed in 2004, although the label continued to release music until 2007. It is known for pioneering the sound of dubstep in the early 2000s, with dubstep DJs and producers working in and frequently visiting the shop. The record label was the first to sign Skream and Benga.

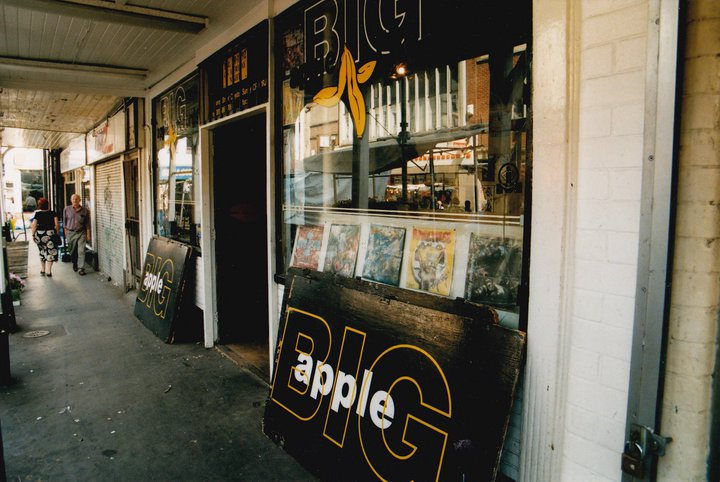
The Big Apple Records shop in Croydon.

== Influence and heritage ==
Big Apple Records is considered by The Verge an important location in the development of dubstep, being considered a key part of Croydon's, and South London's, heritage. The shop acted as a point for artists in the development of dubstep to meet and share music, allowing dubstep to emerge from 2-step garage.

== Name and Logo ==
The shop was opened in November 1992. The shop's location on Surrey Street in Croydon, a large fruit and veg market, led to the shop being named 'Apple Records', shortly changed to 'Big Apple Records' after the Beatles' record label of the same name threatened to sue.

Kennedy asked an artist to produce a range of possible logos, all of which were apples except the banana peel that ended up being used. Kennedy has said that this is because it stood out the most on the page.

== History ==
The shop was founded in November 1992 by Gary Hughes, Steve Robertson, and John-Paul Kennedy. Hughes and Robertson were friends who brought on Kennedy only a few weeks before the shop opened as they required further investment. In 1996, Hughes and Robertson were bought out of the business to leave only Kennedy, as pressure from nearby record shops meant they could no longer sustain three partners.

The shop initially stocked Progressive House and Techno on the ground floor, and Jungle on the first floor. After Hughes and Robertson had left, Artwork was invited by Kennedy to turn the second floor into his studio, and the first floor (which now stocked Drum & Bass) was replaced with listening booths. Later on Hijak would join Artwork in the upstairs studio.

DJ Chef was known to come to the shop and park his moped with attached sound system outside so that customers could listen to their records on it.

Neil Joliffe worked as a distributor that supplied the shop. When Benny Ill started producing early dubstep (which he would show to Artwork and Hijak in the shop), Kennedy suggested that he give them to Joliffe. Joliffe had strong connections in the garage scene, being intimate with labels like Public Demand, Allstar, and Acetate; and so knew distributors and pressing plants. This eventually led Joliffe to form the Tempa Recordings, and Benny Ill to form Horsepower Productions.

When garage became mainstream in the late 90s because of the popularity of garage crews such as So Solid, the ground floor was transitioned to garage in order to boost sales. Due to this success, DJ Hatcha was hired to help run the shop. Hatcha, combined with many of Artwork's releases being available only from the shop, helped Big Apple's popularity with Jungle and Garage producers and DJs. Because his older brother Hijak worked in the shop, Skream started going aged only 14. Skream has stated that he went into the shop most days.

Hatcha started working in the shop when he was young, and was noted for his salesmanship and ability on the decks, but his lack of work ethic caused some tension between him and Kennedy.

Coki was introduced to the shop by Mala, who told him that the music he was producing matched the style of the shop.

The shop closed in November 2004, 12 years to the day after it opened. This was caused in part to a decline in vinyl sales due to the rise of the internet. People ripping records and posting them on sites like The Dubstep Forums (DSF) was a major factor.

As well as the artists like Skream and Hatcha that worked in the shop, others including Digital Mystikz (Mala and Coki) were frequent visitors. El-B, Zed Bias, Horsepower Productions, Plastician, N Type, Walsh and Loefah also regularly visited the shop.

== Releases ==
Title	Artist	Release year	Format	Catalogue Number
Red	Artwork	2002	12" EP	BAM001
Skank / Dose	Benga	2003	12"	BAM002
The Judgment	Skream & Benga	2003	12"	BAM003
Pathways	Digital Mystikz	2003	12"	BAM004
Hydro / Elektro	Skream & Benga	2004	12"	BAM005
Jungle Infiltrator	Loefah	2004	12"	BAM006
Acid People	Skream	2006	12"	BAM007
Invansion	Benga	2006	12"	BAM008
Red Eye	Coki	2007	12"	BAM009
