= Warrior Dubz =

Compilation album by Various artists
- Released: 2006
- Recorded: Various Times
- Genre: Dubstep
- Label: Planet Mu

Warrior Dubz is a dubstep compilation released in 2006 on the Planet Mu label. The album was compiled by Mary Anne Hobbs.

== Track listing ==
1. Milanese vs. Virus Syndicate: Dead Man Walking (3:38)
2. Benga: Music Box (5:08)
3. Andy Stott: Black (6:45)
4. Amit: Too Many Freedoms (5:18)
5. Digital Mystikz (vocals: Spen G): Anti War Dub (6:23)
6. JME (production: Wiley): Pence (2:53)
7. Burial: Versus (6:13)
8. Plastician (vocals: Fresh, Napper & Shizzle): Cha Vocal (3:26)
9. The Bug (vocals: Flowdan): Jah War (3:02)
10. Terror Danjah (vocals: Bruza, Mz Bratt): Give It To 'Em (3:03)
11. Various Production and MC Vez: In This (2:16) (promo release only)
12. Spor: Hydra (6:44)
13. Loefah (vocals: Sgt Pokes): Mud VIP (5:38)
14. DJ Distance & Crazy D: Worries Again (3:52)
15. Kode9 and The Spaceape: Kingstown (4:41)
