= Skream! =

Studio album by Skream
- Released: 30 October 2006
- Genres: Dubstep; dub
- Length: 61:16
- Label: Tempa

Skream chronology
Skream! (2006)	Outside the Box (2010)

Singles from Skream!
- 1. "Midnight Request Line" Released: 31 October 2005; 2. "Tapped / Dutch Flowerz" Released: 2 October 2006

Professional ratings
Review scores
Source	Rating
AllMusic	3.5/5 stars
The Guardian	3/5 stars
The Observer	4/5 stars
Time Out London	4/6 stars

Skream! is the self-titled, debut album by dubstep producer Skream. It was released in 2006 on the Tempa label. The album is considered to be an important stepping stone for dubstep. BBC Music described it as having "accelerated dubstep's transformation from hyped underground scene to [a] sort of influential [genre]", as it fuses more "old-school rave" sounds with more accessible "pop" sounds. The album predates the highly popular and influential dubstep works by producers such as Skrillex, sometimes disparagingly referred to as "brostep". It essentially serves as an accessible entry into "classic dubstep".

The album received positive reviews from critics. Ben Thompson of The Guardian described the track "Summer Dreams" as "a moving tribute to the last indigenous British dance upsurge...". Eddy Lawrence from Time Out commented that "Skream finds beauty in the least obvious places".

== Track listing ==
1. "Tortured Soul" 4:18
2. "Midnight Request Line" 3:56
3. "Blue Eyez" 4:39
4. "Auto-Dub" 2:50
5. "Check It" (featuring Warrior Queen) 4:12
6. "Stagger" 4:41
7. "Dutch Flowerz" 4:21
8. "Rutten" 6:32
9. "Tapped" (featuring JME) 3:38
10. "Kut-Off" 4:33
11. "Summer Dreams" 7:58
12. "Colourful" 5:13
13. "Emotionally Mute" 4:35

=== Expanded Edition ===
1. "Check-It (Instrumental)" 4:13
2. "Midnight Request Line (Mala Remix)" 5:22

The album was also released on vinyl across three plates, with a different track listing.

=== Vinyl track listing ===
- A1 "Stagger"
- B1 "Blue Eyez"
- B2 "Tortured Soul"
- C1 "Kut-Off"
- D1 "Rutten"
- D2 "Colourful"
- E1 "Check-It" (Instrumental)
- F1 "Dubbers Anonymous"
- F2 "Midnight Request Line" (Digital Mystikz Remix)
