= Joe Nice =

American DJ

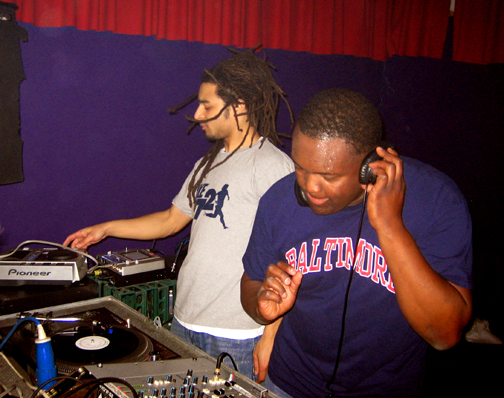
- Joe Nice (right) with Mala in London at DMZ, 2005

Background information
- Born: March 17, 1976 (age 50); Southampton, UK
- Origin: Baltimore, Maryland
- Genre: Dubstep
- Occupation: DJ
- Years active: 2002–present
- Label: GourmetBeats
- Members: Joe Nice
- Website: www.facebook.com/joenicedj

Joe Nice (born c. 1976) is a dubstep DJ from Baltimore, Maryland. Nice was the first person to put on dubstep nights in America and founded New York's irregular Dub War club night, which has hosted performances by British dubstep artists such as Hatcha, Youngsta, Kode9, Mala, and Loefah. He performs regularly in New York, London (including at scene pillar DMZ), and elsewhere. He first heard dubstep in 2002, at the Baltimore venue Starscape, and began playing it that same year. He has been praised for his charisma and stage presence. In 2005, music journalist Martin Clark also praised him for his access to new dubplates (in contrast to other American dubstep DJs) and willingness to play tracks by lesser-known producers. In 2007, Nice was selected as one of URB magazine's "Next 100". In 2015, he founded the label known as Gourmet Beats, pushing content from the likes of Moonstones, Fill Spectre & DJG.

== Early life ==
Nice was born in Southampton, England to Trinidadian parents, but moved to Baltimore at the age of two.
