= Outside the Box (Skream album) =

Studio album by Skream
- Released: 9 August 2010
- Recorded: 2008–2010
- Genre: Dubstep, chillout, electronic
- Label: Tempa
- Producer: Skream

Skream chronology
Skream! (2006)	Outside the Box (2010)

Singles from Outside the Box
- 1. "Listenin' To The Records on My Wall" Released: 3 September 2010; 2. "Where You Should Be" Released: 16 May 2011 / 25 May 2011

Outside the Box is the second and latest album by British dubstep producer Skream, released on 9 August 2010 on Tempa records. The album features collaborations with electropop duo La Roux and American rapper Murs, amongst others. Two singles were released from the album: "Listenin' To The Records on My Wall" and "Where You Should Be" (the latter featuring singer Sam Frank).

== Critical reception ==
Professional ratings
Review scores
Source	Rating
AllMusic	4/5 stars
Clash	8/10 stars
Loud and Quiet	(8/10)
Pitchfork	(7.9/10)
Spin	7/10 stars
Uncut	4/5 stars

At Metacritic, which assigns a rating out of 100 using reviews from mainstream critics, the album received an average score of 76 based on 13 reviews (which indicates "generally favourable reviews"). Alexis Petridis of The Guardian gave the album four out of five stars, praising Skream for "trying to do something different" and "push at the boundaries of his chosen genre". He was, however, critical of the track "Wibbler", branding it "not so much a piece of music as a splitting headache waiting to happen". Chris Power of the BBC gave the album a mixed review, asking "where's the creative reward in rehashing old tricks?"

== Track listing ==
=== CD ===
No.	Title	Length
1.	"Perferated"	2:45
2.	"8 Bit Baby" (featuring Murs)	4:59
3.	"CPU"	4:17
4.	"Where You Should Be" (featuring Sam Frank)	4:26
5.	"How Real" (featuring Freckles)	4:33
6.	"Fields of Emotion"	5:57
7.	"I Love the Way"	5:12
8.	"Listenin' to the Records on My Wall"	3:24
9.	"Wibbler"	4:26
10.	"Metamorphosis"	5:17
11.	"Finally" (featuring La Roux)	4:43
12.	"Reflections" (featuring dBridge & Instra:mental)	5:21
13.	"A Song for Lenny"	3:04
14.	"The Epic Last Song"	5:00

=== Skreamizm bonus CD ===
The deluxe edition of the album comes with a second CD, containing 6 additional tracks.

No.	Title	Length
1.	"Give You Everything" (featuring Freckles)	4:37
2.	"Do U Know"	6:39
3.	"Amity Step"	4:34
4.	"Organic"	6:58
5.	"Stand Up"	5:58
6.	"WTF"	5:01

=== Vinyl track listing ===
No.	Title	Length
1.	"8 Bit Baby" (Instrumental)	4:59
2.	"Where You Should Be" (featuring Sam Frank)	4:26
3.	"How Real" (featuring Freckles)	4:33
4.	"Fields of Emotion"	5:57
5.	"I Love the Way"	5:12
6.	"Wibbler"	4:26
7.	"Reflections" (featuring dBridge & Instra:Mental)	5:21
8.	"The Epic Last Song"	5:00

== In popular culture ==
- The song "Listenin' To The Records on My Wall" was featured in the video game, DiRT 3.
