= Wave music =

Electronic bass music genre

Wave
- Stylistic origins: Electronic; bass music; trap; witch house; dubstep; grime; LA beat; drill; UK garage; trance; lo-fi; techno; jungle; rap; cloud rap; hip hop; ambient; house; video game music; R&B; rock; emo; post-punk
- Cultural origins: Early 2010s, Internet
- Typical instruments: Audio editing software; digital audio workstation; sequencer; sampler

Subgenres
- Hardwave, Phonkwave

Wave is a genre of bass music and a visual art style that emerged in the early 2010s in online communities. It is characterized by atmospheric melodies and harmonies, melodic and heavy bass such as reese, modern trap drums, chopped vocal samples processed with reverb and delay, and arpeggiators. Visually, it incorporates computer-generated imagery and animation, and imagery from video games and cartoons.

Wave music originated on online music platforms from a small group of DIY artists. Since then, wave music uploaded to streaming platforms such as YouTube has gathered millions of plays, which is partially attributable to the genre's broad influences. Since 2016, the wave scene has experienced an increase in physical events. From 2017 onward, the genre further incorporated elements of trance and hardstyle, leading to the emergence of the hardwave subgenre.

== Characteristics ==
=== Musical qualities and influences ===
Wave conveys feelings and qualities of melancholy similarly to witch house and emo rap, dreaminess, sci-fi akin to grime, femininity, and otherworldliness. Wave emphasizes melodic and harmonic aspects in combination to drawing from styles such as trap and grime for interludes and drum beats. Wave has experimentalism relative to the Los Angeles beat scene, and incorporates elements from many other genres such as hip-hop, dubstep, UK garage, drill, vaporwave, cloud rap, video game music and sound design, ambient, house, techno, and jungle.

=== Production style ===
A genre of bass music, wave is typically bass heavy, while using a filtered Reese style bass timbre. The percussion features trap-style drums with fast hi-hats, with other elements like snare and pan-hits further processed using reverb. The percussive styles used can vary owing to the music's broad range of influences and producers' willingness to experiment. The beats per minute typically varies between 120 and 140, but wave DJ sets may range from 100 to 200. Vocals used are generally chopped samples, with the pitch decreased and increased in conjunction with reverb and delay.

=== Visual aesthetics ===
Wave's visual aesthetics incorporates digital art such as computer-generated imagery and animation. In the scene's origins, these artworks were combined with wave music on Tumblr, and later become used as visuals for physical events. Wave can also display imagery taken from video games and cartoons.

== History ==
The development and spread of wave music as an independent genre began in the early 2010s at online music platforms and social media (mainly SoundCloud, Bandcamp, Mixcloud, Reddit, and Tumblr), among a small DIY community of artists—often teenagers who were not associated with club culture and the mainstream—who were making electronic music with different sonic influences but, according to producer Glacci, similar subjective qualities of "feeling". Plastician has said that many of those early producers were either trying to achieve rap instrumentation akin to Clams Casino, or had grime influences but applied different tempos. As new artists attempted to reproduce the sound of these early tracks, wave producers began to be influenced mainly by each other, which allowed wave to develop distinguishable musical characteristics.

Wave's musical scene direct origins can be dated to at least 2013 when UK-based producer Steven "Klimeks" Adams began tagging his tracks on SoundCloud as wave, and subsequently founded the prominent label Wavemob, which published its first release in 2016, the compilation album wave 001 with tracks by producers such as Klimeks, Skit, Spoze, and Nvrmore. Also in 2013, Plastician became an early promoter of the wave scene by featuring wave music during his radio shows on Rinse FM, and by releases on his label Terrorhythm Recordings, for instance Klimeks's remix of "Born in the Cold" on the compilation album Turquoise. In December 2015, Plastician released The Wave Pool MMXV mix featuring a selection of wave music that popularized the term wave within the music press and further promoted its general usage.

In early 2016, UKF Music and Futuremag Music wrote that wave producer Jude "Kareful" Leigh-Kaufman released the first full-length wave album, Deluge. Following in 2017, Kareful et al. founded the Liquid Ritual label and collective to promote wave music.

Since 2016, the wave scene—originally an online phenomenon—has experienced an increase in physical events such as in London, primarily Dalston. For example, entities that promoted events in London include Plastician who ran the Survey London wave nightclub in 2016 at Phonox, in Brixton; Mixmag featuring wave artists at Ace Hotel; and Kareful. Regarding the United States wave scene, in December 2022, Vibe.digital, Human Error//, and Soul Food Music Collective collaborated on a three-day wave festival in Seattle, named Pantheon, the largest in that country as of 2024. The ongoing Los Angeles based wave showcase event Tears In The Club also emerged in 2022 and currently represents the largest recurrent and exclusively wave focused event in the western hemisphere. Further local scenes include Poland, Russia, and Canada.

In 2017, Perth-based producers Skeler, Ytho, began incorporating elements from trance and hardstyle into wave for appealing to the broader festival and club audiences, coining the name hardwave and popularizing the genre. This lead the wave scene to evolve into the emergent subgenre known as hardwave.

The Asian wave scene includes Japanese musician Dean Fujioka. In 2018, he released the single "Echo" which became the theme song for the Japanese TV series The Count of Monte-Cristo: Great Revenge. The music video for the song also won the Best Alternative Video at the MTV Video Music Awards Japan. In 2021, he released the song "Plan B" as the "latest evolution of wave".

== Reception ==
In May 2017, Vice published an article by Ezra Marcus arguing that the wave community and bloggers were categorizing a wide range of music within the sonically undefined "constructed microgenre" of wave, in order to strategically influence algorithms on streaming platforms such as YouTube. Plastician responded to Marcus's article, arguing that most wave producers were generally younger people who lack marketing skills and are unfamiliar with YouTube algorithms.
