= Plastician =

British music producer (born 1982)

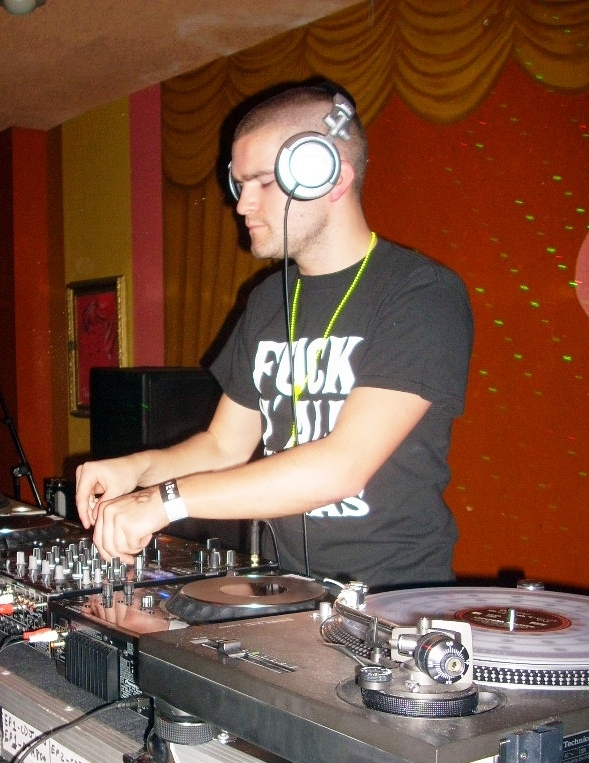
- Plastician in 2009

Background information
- Also known as: Plasticman
- Born: Christopher Harle Reed; 30 October 1982 (age 43)
- Origin: Croydon, London, England
- Genres: Dubstep, grime, breakstep
- Occupations: DJ, producer
- Years active: 1999–present
- Labels: Mishka, Terrorythm Recordings, ROAD, Slimzos, Soulja, Trouble & Bass, Owsla

Christopher Harle Reed (born 30 October 1982), also known as Plastician (formerly Plasticman), is an English electronic musician from Thornton Heath in the London Borough of Croydon.

== History ==
Plastician, real name Chris Reed is a DJ from Croydon in South London. He began playing UK garage records in 2000, playing early shows in the local area of Croydon. Reed began to take interest in the darker side of the sound, specialising in sets featuring tracks from the likes of Wookie, Zed Bias, El-B, Groove Chronicles, Steve Gurley and working alongside MCs Tricks & Spellz as part of the "Fearless Crew". They held radio slots on South London's inconsistent pirate station "Desire FM" before moving to 2GFM before the split of Fearless Crew in 2002. It was then that Reed was to begin using the name Plasticman for future works, which he later changed to Plastician due to the similarity to Canadian-British techno artist Richie Hawtin's "Plastikman".

Toward the middle of 2001, Reed had been experimenting with production on FruityLoops. Being based in Croydon, Reed was part of a close-knit community of young producers attempting to make dark garage tracks that would catch the ear of Big Apple Records resident DJ Hatcha so that he could support them on his popular pirate radio show. Other young producers in this circle included Skream and Benga, amongst more experienced heads Artwork / Menta, Benny Ill & Horsepower Productions. By the end of 2001, although Plasticman's tracks were somewhat overlooked by DJ Hatcha, they were however picked up by East London Grime pioneer, DJ Slimzee. Slimzee signed Reed's first 12" release (Venom / Shockwave) to his Slimzos imprint which was released early into 2002.

By 2003, Reed had been supported by DJ Hatcha on tracks such as Hard Graft, which saw his grimy take on the instrumental sound being welcomed by the FWD contingent, leading to releases on Ammunition Promotions' Soulja, and ROAD imprints, a weekly slot on Rinse FM alongside Mark One (MRK1) & Virus Syndicate, and in the summer saw Reed's first appearance at the world-famous FWD event at Plastic People, London. Soon after, Reed had established himself as a FWD favourite and was announced as one of 4 residents at the club in 2004, alongside Dubstep royalty, DJ Hatcha, Youngsta and Rinse FM owner, Geeneus.

In 2006, Reed was offered a slot on BBC Radio 1's "The Residency". This soon turned into "In New DJ's We Trust". This was the tipping point for an ongoing legal struggle which forced him to change his name from Plasticman to Plastician. He spent 18 months on the station before returning to Rinse FM to continue his weekly slot, which he had been continuing under the alias "Blue Stripe" during his time at the BBC. He returned to the airwaves on Rinse FM alongside MC Nomad.

2007 saw the release of "Beg to Differ", Reed's debut LP and his first release under the Plastician moniker. It received critical acclaim, and contains some of Reed's most recognisable works such as "Japan" and "Intensive Snare" with North London MC Skepta of Boy Better Know.

Plastician also played a role in putting together the "Cashmere Agency Presents Mr. Grustle & Tha Russian Dubstep LA Embrace The Renaissance Vol.1 Mixed by Dj Plastician" mixtape that was released in June 2009. The tracks were curated by Plastician and featured Dubstep and Hip Hop collaborations involving Snoop Dogg, Xzibit and more. Plastician is unique in that he is respected as one of the true pioneers of both the Dubstep and Grime genres.

== Terrorhythm Recordings ==
Plastician runs his own record label, Terrorhythm Recordings, formed in 2002. The label is known for signing both Om Unit and Joker's first releases as well as releasing Plastician's critically acclaimed Beg to Differ album, it also saw early releases from Macabre Unit, Maniac, Crissy Criss, and Mark One. In recent times, the label has broadened its sonic palate – as has Plastician. Terrorhythm currently represents musicians associated with today's future beats movement, housing artists such as AWE, GANZ, Louis Futon and Krane among others within its ranks; many of whom have been releasing on the label since their debut releases. More recently, Plastician has explored the experimental trap offshoot, wave music for which his "Wavepool" mixes have become recognized as the main reference point for the birth of the genre. He has recruited artists representing the wave sound such as Noah B, Sorsari, Deadcrow, Glacci, & Yedgar to release via Terrorhythm and bring the underground internet sound to new ears from 2016 onward.

=== Terrorhythm Recordings releases ===
Year	No.	Artist	Title
2003	TERR001	Mark One	Fight / Fight (Plasticman Remix)
2004	TERR002	Plasticman	Cha EP
2004	TERR003	Plasticman	Value Beats EP
2004	TERR004	Macabre Unit	Lift Off EP
2008	TERR005	Joker	Top of the Game EP
2010	TERR006	Crissy Criss	Blow Your Head Off / Humans
2010	TERR007	Maniac	Thug / Wreckage
2010	TERR008	Om Unit	The Corridor EP
2011	TERR009	Psy:am & Stinkahbell	Don't Tell Mum About Ibiza
2012	TERR010	Plastician	Straight Outta Croydon EP
2012	TERR011	Stinkahbell & Psy:am	Hot Poo
2012	TERR012	Stinkahbell	Film Noir EP
2013	TERR013	Mojo	Blues EP
2013	TERR014	AWE	Eagle Soul EP
2013	TERR015	Alexandre	Dead Silent EP
2013	TERR016	Anton F	Crimson EP
2013	TERR017	Louis Futon	Dozing / Plastic
2013	TERR018	GANZ	Purple Cwtch EP
2013	TERR019	Curl Up	Missed U EP
2014	TERR020	AWE	Crystals
2014	TERR021	Skit & Tijani	Sweat
2014	TERR022	Varsity	Grunt / Lingerer Dub
2014	TERR023	JD. Reid	Maneki Neko EP
2014	TERR024	Parkinson White & Kyle Cook	Sapphire EP
2014	TERR025	Deon Custom	Bliss EP
2014	TERR026	KRNE	Zero Zero One EP
2014	TERR027	Plastician	Plasticman Remastered
2014	TERR028	Plastician	Plasticman Remixed I
2014	TERR029	Plastician	Plasticman Remixed II
2014	TERR030	Plastician	Plasticman Remixed III
2014	TERR031	AWE	Griffin
2015	TERR032	Color Plus	Mangata Sequence EP
2015	TERR033	Gunkst	Bodied EP
2015	TERR034	GANZ	Dino War EP
2015	TERR035	Anton F	Indigo EP
2015	TERR036	Mace	Love Songs EP
2015	TERR037	BeauDamian	Pleione EP
2015	TERR038	Skuls	Lost Knowledge EP
2015	TERR039	Plastician	Sorcery
2015	TERR040	Patrick Brian	8 Months EP
2016	TERR041	Noah B	Night's Edge EP
2016	TERR042	Mace	Touch Me (2XA Remix)
2016	TERR043	Plastician	Do What You Feel
2016	TERR044	Glacci	Lucid EP
2016	TERR045	ZEKE BEATS	Meltdown EP
2016	TERR046	Deadcrow	Night Wonder EP
2016	TERR047	Sosari	Worlds Away EP
2016	TERR048	Skuls	Transient EP
2016	TERR049	Skuls	Terminal EP
2016	TERR050	Celaeno	The Celaeno EP
2017	TERR051	ONHELL	Noself EP
2017	TERR052	Klasey Jones	Foreign Buyers Club EP
2017	TERR053	Deadcrow	Light Trails EP
2017	TERR054	Patrick Brian	Strings & Squares EP
2017	TERR055	Various Artists	Plastician Presents - Wavepool 2
2017	TERR056	Glacci	Lifeforce LP
2017	TERR057	Klasey Jones	Eleven LP
2017	TERR059	Compa	Awow EP
2018	TERR058	Om Unit	The Corridor (Remixes)
2018	TERR060	Flechewave	Kinetics EP
2018	TERR061	Klasey Jones	Starlight One EP
2018	TERR062	Plastician	Overdue EP
2018	TERR063	Boy Racers	Exit Strategy EP
2018	TERR064	Plastician	Anyway EP
2019	TERR065	Klasey Jones	Blood Money EP
2019	TERR066	Rapture 4D & gl00my	Green Boson EP
2019	TERR067	Vexxy & Jato	Night Shift / Nylon
2019	TERR068	Klasey Jones	Arrival EP
2019	TERR069	ONHELL	Graveyard Shift
2019	TERR070	ONHELL	Kill Your Self Doubt EP
2019	TERR071	Tracksuit Goth	Blacksmith EP
2020	TERR072	Juche & Plastician	eNight (Revisited)
2020	TERR073	Plastician	Deep In The Drives
2020	TERR074	Mod Sens	Hollow E.P.
2020	TERR075	Plastician	Process
2020	TERR076	Various Artists	Plastician Presents - Wavepool 3
2021	TERR077	Yedgar	Life Cycle E.P.
