= Truth (duo) =

New Zealand dubstep production duo

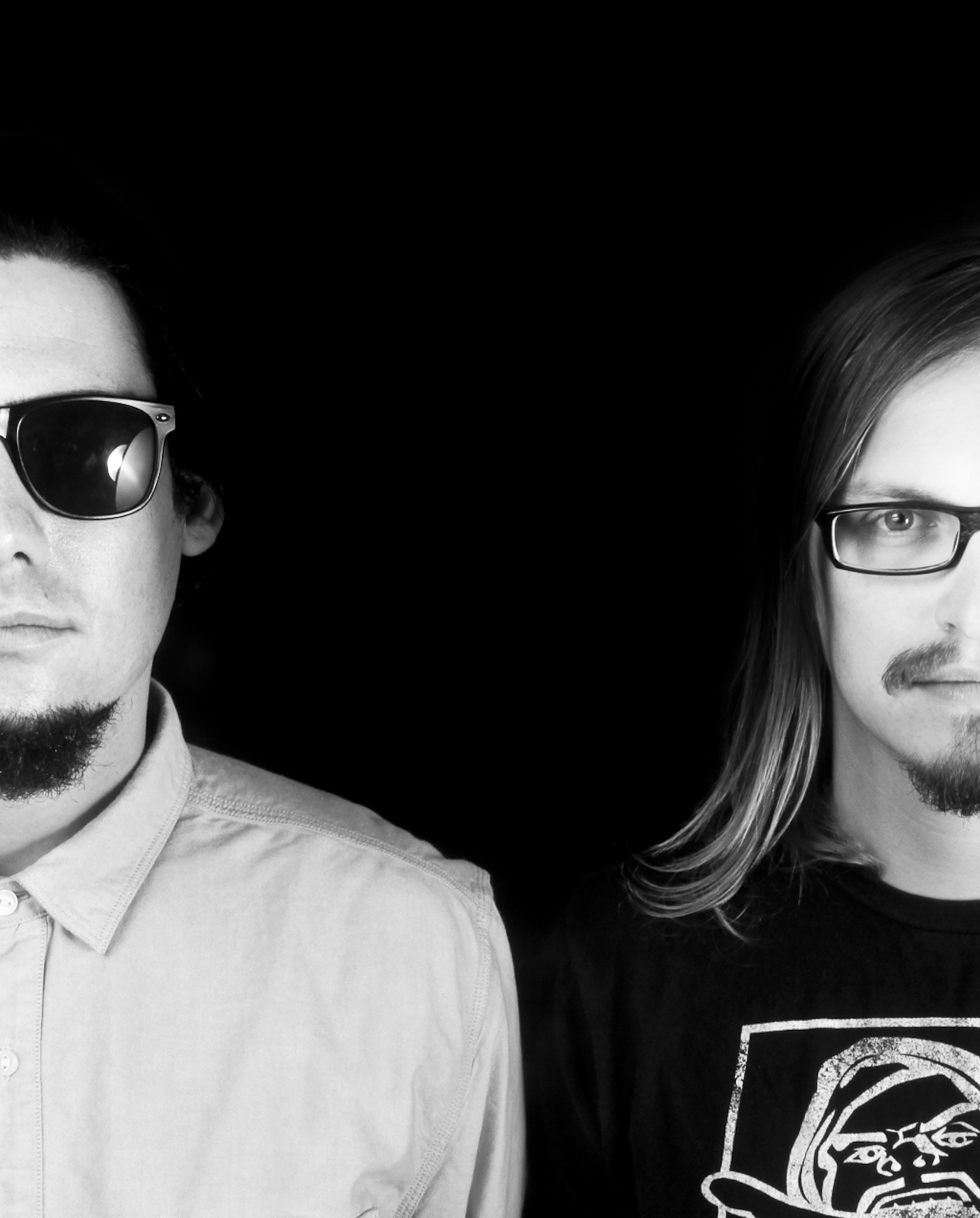

Background information
- Origin: Christchurch, New Zealand
- Genres: Dubstep, Drum & Bass, Bass
- Years active: 2007–present
- Labels: Deep Medi; Deep Dark & Dangerous; Tempa Recordings; Disfigured Dubz; Disciple; Argon; Aquatic Lab; Boka; Wheel & Deal; GetDarker; Black Box; Moonshine; Firepower; Wakaan; Subcarbon
- Spinoffs: Shadow People
- Members: Tristan Roake; Andre Fernandez
- Past members: Julian Van Uden

Truth is the stage name of the Christchurch, New Zealand dubstep duo composed of Andre Fernandez and Tristan Roake.

Truth have been active in the dubstep scene since their formation in 2007, known for their deep, dark, and heavy sound characterized by basslines and drops. Their music often blends influences from dub, reggae, drum & bass and hip-hop.

Truth perform as DJs and have toured since the mid-2000s, including tours of North America, UK/EU & NZ/AUS, and Latin America, and festivals including Shambhala, Outlook, Electric Daisy Carnival, Electric Forest, Boomtown, Earth Frequency, and Rabbits Eat Lettuce.

Currently based in Portland, Oregon and Christchurch, NZ, Truth remain active in the global dubstep circuit, regularly performing and releasing new music.

== Career ==
=== Establishment and Early Years (2007-2010) ===
Initial Breakthrough: Truth began releasing music in late 2007, when Mala of Digital Mystikz signed their debut single The Fatman / Stolen Children, and released it in 2009 on the label DEEP MEDi Musik. Described by Boomkat as "dark and immaculately executed”, the single (released as MEDi13x on 12" vinyl format.) established their reputation for producing dark, heavy, and meticulously crafted bass music.

Early Beginning: Following their initial success, Truth went on to release several EPs and singles that further solidified their standing within the dubstep world. Notable early tracks include The Future, Terror Planet, Amnesia, Wednesday, Stay, International, Revelation, Timeshift, and Hackerz to name a few.

Debut Album: In September 2010, Truth released their debut album, Puppets, through Sydney-based Aquatic Lab Records. The album was nominated for Best Dubstep Album at the 2011 DubstepForum Awards. Puppets was praised for its authentic dubstep sound, with reviews from outlets like Knowledge Magazine, who lauded the album for its representation of "dubstep in its purest form" and characterized it as "spacious, sub-heavy and forward-thinking". Music Week described it as "an expansive listen that works as well on headphones as in a club"., while The New Zealand Herald branded Puppets "sinister yet soulful" praising its "beautifully brutal bass-laden beats".

In April 2011, Truth released a New Zealand-only double-CD version of Puppets. It included a bonus disc of remixes, previously unreleased material and a 35-minute mix of music from the album. The group stated that all proceeds from sales would go directly to charities involved with rebuilding Christchurch following the earthquake of February 2011.

In early 2011, Julian Van Auden left the group and now performs solo under the moniker Gamble.

=== Expanding Influence and Discography (2011-2016) ===
Between 2011 and 2016, Truth increased their music releases and touring and established their own record label. The duo cemented their reputation as key figures in the genre, and their work during these years has had a lasting impact on both their career and the broader bass music landscape.

Sophomore Album: Following debut album Puppets in 2010, Truth released their second full-length album Love’s Shadow in 2012.

Singles and EP's: During this period, Truth released a series of singles and EPs that maintained their presence & momentum in the scene. Notable releases include:

- The Emperor (2011): Released on N-Type's Wheel & Deal Records.
- Redlight (2012): Released on J:Kenzo's seminal Artikal Music imprint.
- Devil’s Hands EP (2013): Released on the label Tempa, Devil’s Hand was a release in their catalog that used dark, brooding dubstep. Seeing broader commercial success, Devil's Hands went on to be featured in cable network FX's wildly successful American Horror Story series.
- 30,000 Ft EP (2014): Released on Mala's Deep Medi Musik label.
- How Strange EP (2014): Released on Tempa Recordings, the EP presented some of Truth's most haunting offerings, with title track How Strange opening with eerie, ethereal vocals layered over dark, brooding sub-bass. Hypnotic, haunting atmosphere.
- Undeniable EP (2014): Undeniable was the debut EP on Truth's newly formed label, Deep, Dark & Dangerous, marking the beginning of a new chapter in their career as label heads. The EP showcased their signature deep, atmospheric sound, blending minimalistic production with heavy basslines. The immersive, subtle nature of Undeniable helped set the tone for the label, which would go on to become a prominent platform for dark, experimental dubstep.
- The Ark EP (2015): Released in 2015 on Firepower Records, this EP represented a unique blend of Truth's deep dubstep sound with broader musical experimentation. The EP received critical acclaim for its ability to balance dark, atmospheric dubstep with more diverse influences, such as house and beat-driven tracks. VICE's THUMP commented, that “Berlin,” for example, is an Ibiza-ready house tune, whereas “Come to Mind” featuring Lelijveld is a beat scene classic that wouldn’t seem out of sorts at Low End Theory.
- Devils Game EP (2015): Released on their own Deep, Dark & Dangerous label imprint, this EP further explored their signature dark and minimal sound.

==== Deep, Dark & Dangerous Label ====
In 2014, Truth established the record label Deep, Dark & Dangerous. The label primarily includes dubstep artists and releases.

=== Growth and Continued Evolution (2017-Present) ===
As of 2024, Truth continues to release music as artists and through their label. They continue to tour internationally, release new music, and support established & emerging talent through DDD.

== Discography ==
Release date	Label	Cat#	Artist(s)	Release name	Format
2009	Deep Medi Musik	MEDI-013	Truth	The Fatman / Stolen Children	12" / WEB
2009	Optimus Gryme Recordings	OG12002	Optimus Gryme & Truth	The Immortal Truth	12" / WEB
2009	Aquatic Lab	LAB006	Truth	Terror Planet	12"
2009	Aquatic Lab	LAB007	Truth	Revelations	12"
2010	Aquatic Lab	LABCD002	Truth	Puppets	CD / WEB
2010	Deep Medi Musik	MEDI-32	Truth	Amnesia / International	12" / WEB
2010	Disfigured Dubz	DISF010	Truth	Stranger Than Fiction	12" / WEB
2010	Argon	ARG031	Truth & Dutty Ranks	Bombay Sapphire / Worlds Apart	12" / WEB
2010	Boka Records	BOKA027	Truth	Timeshift / Hackerz	12"
2010	Aquatic Lab	LAB010	Truth	Burglar / Dead Silence	12"
2010	Aquatic Lab	LAB011	Truth	Juno / Under Current	12"
2011	Wheel & Deal	WHEELYDEALY022	Truth	The Emperor	12" / WEB
2011	Deep Medi Musik	MEDI-39	Truth	Fatman VIP	12"
2011	GetDarker	GDKR003	Truth	Direct Blow / Snake	12"
2011	Black Box	BLACKBOX019	Truth	Full Baked / Birds	12"
2012	Boka Records	BOKA039	Truth	Insanity / Skitzo	12"
2012	Tempa	TEMPA065	Truth	Dreams / Last Time	12" / WEB
2012	Artikal Music UK	ARTKL003	Truth	Babylon London	12" / WEB
2012	Love Sick Recordings	LUVSIC002	Truth / Riskotheque & Marchmellow	Don't Explain / 1-800-Love	12"
2012	Moonshine Recordings	MS009	Babylon System vs. Truth	Babylon War	12" / WEB
2012	Tuba Records	TUBA003	Truth	All Alone / Good & Evil	12"
2013	Tempa	TEMPA076	Truth	Devil's Hands	12" / WEB
2013	Tempa	TEMPA082	Truth	Chicks & Drugs / Empire	12" / WEB
2013	New Moon Recordings	NMN007	Truth	Iron Lung / Medusa	12"
2014	Tempa	TEMPA095	Truth	Truth / J:Kenzo	12" / WEB
2014	Deep Medi Musik	MEDI-81	Truth	30,000 ft	12" / WEB
2014	Tempa	TEMPA085	Truth	How Strange	12" / WEB
2014	Deep, Dark and Dangerous	DDD01	Truth	Undeniable	12" / WEB
2015	Firepower Records	POW096	Truth	The Ark	12" / WEB
2016	Deep, Dark and Dangerous	DDD003	Truth	Devils Game	12" / WEB
2016	Deep Medi Musik	MEDI-92	Truth	War Of The Minds	12" / WEB
2017	Deep Medi Musik	MEDI-98	Truth	Lion	12" / WEB
2017	Uprise Audio	UALPS007	Seven / Truth / Juss B	Bangbadem / Sour Power	12"
2017	Deep, Dark and Dangerous	DDD018	Sectra, Truth	Lucid Dreams	WEB
2018	Deep, Dark and Dangerous	DDD036	Truth	Mushrooms	12" / WEB
2018	Deep, Dark and Dangerous	DDD044	Truth	Lurker	12" / WEB
2018	Deep, Dark and Dangerous	DDD034	Truth, Stylust Beats, Youngsta	Freakshow	WEB
2018	Disciple	DISC095	The Upbeats, Truth	The Pack	WEB
2019	Wakaan	WAK069	Truth	The Unexpected	12" / WEB
2019	UKF Music	UKFTEN008	Truth	Pixelated Pixie	WEB
2019	Deep, Dark and Dangerous	DDD046	Truth, Lelijveld	Tears	WEB
2019	Deep, Dark and Dangerous	DDD056	Truth	Robot Society	WEB
2019	Deep, Dark and Dangerous	DDD058	Truth	Risky	WEB
2020	Deep, Dark and Dangerous	DDD061	Truth	Sunshine	WEB
2020	Deep, Dark and Dangerous	DDD050	Truth	Show Dem	12" / WEB
2020	Deep, Dark and Dangerous	N/A	Truth	Voids	WEB
2020	Deep, Dark and Dangerous	DDD066	Truth	Without You	WEB
2020	Deep Medi Musik	MEDi114	Truth	Subchaser	12" / WEB
2020	Deep, Dark and Dangerous	DDD072	Truth	Neptune	WEB
2020	Wakaan	WAK100	Truth	Druids	WEB
2021	Deep, Dark and Dangerous	DDD074	Truth	Reginald	WEB
2021	Deep, Dark and Dangerous	DDD075	Truth	Acceptance	12" / WEB
2022	Deep, Dark and Dangerous	DDD088	Truth	Twinkle Toad	WEB
2022	Deep, Dark and Dangerous	DDD095	Truth	Afterlife	WEB
2022	Deep, Dark and Dangerous	DDD100	Truth, Youngsta, N-Type	Connected Illusions	WEB
2022	Deep, Dark and Dangerous	DDD100	Truth, Pushloop, Kwizma	Cataclysm	WEB
2022	Deep, Dark and Dangerous	DDD101	Truth	Hypno	WEB
2023	Deep, Dark and Dangerous	DDD110	Truth	No, No, No	WEB
2023	Deep, Dark and Dangerous	MEDi125	Truth	Temple of Eyes EP	WEB
2023	Artikal Music	ARTKLP005	Truth	Maple	WEB
2023	Deep, Dark and Dangerous	DDD119	Truth	Leviathan	WEB
2023	Deep, Dark and Dangerous	DDDLP7	Truth	Trilogy of the Toads	12" / WEB
2023	Deep, Dark and Dangerous	N/A	Truth	Elephant Scatter	WEB
2024	Deep, Dark and Dangerous	DDD123	PAV4N and Truth	Brave New World	WEB
2024	Deep, Dark and Dangerous	DDD126	Truth	Summer Days	WEB
2024	Deep, Dark and Dangerous	DDDLPXS6	Truth	The Illuminated	WEB
2024	Deep, Dark and Dangerous	DDD134	Truth	Woden	WEB
2025	Deadbeats	00044003436640	Truth	Badman	WEB
2025	Deep, Dark and Dangerous	DDD161	Truth	Sedona	WEB
