= Klaypex =

- Origin: Miami, Florida
- Genres: Electro house, complextro, brostep
- Years active: 2010–2016
- Members: Johnny Atar, Alan Notkin, Mark Emmanuel
- Website: Klaypex.com

Klaypex is an electronic trio consisting of Johnny Atar (aka Neovaii, previously part of the music-duo Veorra), Alan Notkin (aka One True God, formerly part of the music-duo Yntendo) and Mark Emmanuel (part of the music-duo The Tech Thieves) that produces variations of house, complextro, and dubstep. Atar, Notkin, and Emmanuel, currently based in California, released their debut album, Loose Dirt, during the summer of 2011. Ready To Go, their second album, was self-released on April 9, 2012, it peaked at No. 13 on Dance/Electronic Albums in the US, and No. 18 on the Top Heatseekers Billboard chart. Their album Anything Goes was released on August 12, 2014.

== History ==
=== Member backgrounds ===
Johnny Atar was born on December 1, 1989, to an Israeli Jewish family in Manhattan, New York. His parents worked at the ministry of foreign affairs, and Atar was raised in many different parts of the world. Finally, in 2005, they moved to Toronto, which is where Atar had met Emmanuel in 2006. In 2010, Atar and his family retired to Miami.

Mark Emmanuel was born on December 20, 1989, to a Russian Jewish family in Krasnodar, USSR (presently known as Russia). His family moved to Israel shortly after in 1990. In 2004, Emmanuel and his family moved to Toronto, Canada. Later on, in 2006, Johnny and Mark met, and later formed Klaypex.

=== Founding ===
Atar and Emmanuel previously lived in Toronto, Ontario, Canada, from 2005 to 2011. They became friends in 2006 and began writing together in 2007. They started out with an Alternative Rock project (Pulsar), writing music in Guitar Pro, which later, in 2008, was recorded in GarageBand.

In early 2009, they began taking music production more seriously, and worked to improve Pulsar. During the summer of 2010, Atar and his family moved, forcing Pulsar to split up. For the majority of the winter of 2010, Emmanuel studied independent music production in Toronto while focusing on a pop project with a producer he had met. During that time, Atar focused all of his attention on making tracks and polishing his production skills, writing industrial, R&B, hip hop, electro house, acoustic, and rock music.

In 2010, Atar flew back to Toronto to work with Emmanuel and his fellow producer. The trio had moved the pop project, 1UP, to Miami to continue production. During the time in Miami, the band recorded two singles, one of which was released. During the second quarter of 2011, the band moved back to Toronto. During that time, the three had a falling out, and 1UP broke up.

Atar and Emmanuel then sought to continue writing music, and decided to take on producing electronic music. After a few months of refining their sound, Klaypex was formed.

=== 2011-12: Loose Dirt and Ready to Go ===
Klaypex's discography consists of their debut album Loose Dirt, released on August 8, 2011. It includes a total of 8 tracks, Ready to Go, which consists of 12 tracks, Anything Goes which consists of 14 tracks, and several singles.

Ready To Go, their second album, was self-released on April 9, 2012, it peaked at No. 13 on Dance/Electronic Albums in the US, and No. 18 on the Top Heatseekers Billboard chart.

=== 2013-14 ===
Klaypex has received attention due to their collaboration with YouTube channels Corridor Digital & DUBSTEP GUNS video. Klaypex initially contacted Mike Diva to inquire about a possible music video to accompany the release of Loose Dirt. They sent him bits and pieces of the EP. During that time, Mike Diva was planning a video collaboration with Corridor Digital, and at one point showed them some of the tracks. They had the idea for DUBSTEP GUNS, and the concept was later filmed and released. The video includes a mix of four of Klaypex's original tracks, "Lights", "Rain", "Hit Me" and "Chinter's Will", custom edited to fit the video.

In April 2013, Klaypex collaborated with YouTube channel Epic Meal Time on a video called "Sauce Boss", in which Klaypex was responsible for the track production.

Their album Anything Goes was released on August 12, 2014.

== Discography ==
=== Studio albums ===
List of studio albums, with selected chart positions
Title	Album details	Peak chart positions	
Title	Album details	US Dance	US Heat
Loose Dirt	Released: August 8, 2011 (US); Label: Klaypex Records; Formats: CD, digital download	—	—
Ready To Go	Released: April 9, 2012 (US); Label: Klaypex Records; Formats: CD, digital download	13	18
Anything Goes	Released: August 12, 2014 (US); Label: Klaypex Records; Formats: CD, digital download	—	—

=== Extended plays ===
List of EPs, with selected chart positions
Title	Album details	Peak chart positions	
Title	Album details	US Dance	US Heat
The Future - EP	Released: April 28, 2015 (US); Label: Klaypex Records; Formats: CD, digital download	—	—

=== Singles ===
List of singles as lead artist, with year released and album name
Title	Year	Album
"I Walk Alone"	2013	Non-album single
"Sauce Boss" (featuring Epic Meal Time)	2013	Non-album single
"Oil Spill"	2014	Non-album single
"Be Free (w/ Aero Chord)"	2015	Non-album single
"Journey"	2016	Non-album single
"I Remember"	2016	Non-album single

== See also ==
- List of dubstep musicians
