= Om Unit =

- Also known as: 2Tall; Jim Coles; Nyquist; Philip D Kick; Dream Continuum; Mahakala
- Born: Jim Coles
- Origin: London, England
- Genres: Electronic, dubstep, bass, hip-hop, drum and bass, jungle
- Instrument: Computer
- Years active: 2010-present
- Labels: Civil Music, Metalheadz, Cosmic Bridge, Exit Records, Planet Mu
- Website: www.omunit.com

Jim Coles (born c. 1980), professionally known as Om Unit, is an English, Bristol-based electronic producer and DJ, known for his work in electronic music and drum and bass.

== Career ==
Originally producing jungle as a teenager in the 1990s, he then turned to turntablism under the name 2tall^{[3]} and released several Albums under this moniker in the 2000s. It was not until 2009 that the Om Unit alias came about with his debut release on a compilation for Fabric entitled encoder, which was swiftly followed by a white-label remix of Joker's "Digidesign" and an EP called The Corridor EP on Plastician's label Terrorhythm.

In 2011 he found a more permanent home, with the record label Civil Music taking up release and management duties, releasing three EPs namely, The Timps, Transport and Aeolian, followed by an album Threads. During this time he worked on a one-off EP with Machinedrum entitled 'Reworkz' under the alias 'dream continuum' for Planet Mu. and arguably was one of the first people to fuse the style of Chicago footwork with classic jungle music under the alias 'Philip D Kick'.

In parallel to these ventures, Om Unit started his own record label Cosmic Bridge in 2011 which has since released music from Kromestar, DJ Madd, Boxcutter, TMSV, Graphs, Danny Scrilla, J(ay) A.D. Neuropol, Moresounds and J:Kenzo as well as himself with his own 'Torchlight' series of EP's and his series of 'Cosmology' compilations featuring exclusive tracks and remixes from artists from the label.

Following on from the exploration of his Jungle roots with projects like Philip D Kick, Om Unit set about working with seminal Drum N Bass label Metalheadz and releasing one EP and a full-length LP in 2014 entitled Inversions which came about through a creative relationship with Goldie, who allowed him access to original DAT tapes containing samples from his personal archive. Alongside this he has also released three EPs with fellow Bristolian Sam Binga, the first of which was released on DBridge's label Exit Records.

in 2016 he was involved with a group project for Exit under the alias "Richie Brains", with an LP of works from himself, Sam Binga, Alix Perez, Chimpo, Fixate, Fracture, and Stray who collaborated over a series of sessions to put together a collection of works that became the full album.

== Discography ==
=== Releases ===
Title	Alias	Release	Label
The Timps	Om Unit	2011	Civil Music
Transport	Om Unit	2011	Civil Music
Aeolian	Om Unit	2012	Civil Music
Threads	Om Unit	2013	Civil Music
Inversion	Om Unit	2014	Metalheadz
Self	Om Unit	2017	Cosmic Bridge
Violet	Om Unit	2019	Cosmic Bridge
Acid Dub Studies	Om Unit	2021	Om Unit
Acid Dub Studies II	Om Unit	2022	Om Unit
Fragments	Om Unit	2024	Om Unit
Acid Dub Studies III	Om Unit	2025	Om Unit

=== Remixes ===
- Joker - Digidesign (Om Unit's Pop Lock Remix) (2010)
- Foreign Beggars - No More (Om Unit's Andromedan Battlemix) (2010)
- Foreign Beggars - Higher (Om Unit's Spacial Awareness Dub) (2010)
- Adam Freeland - How To Fake Your Own Life (Om Unit Remix) (2010)
- Kidkanevil - Tintinnabuli (Om Unit's Drexciyan Meditation Remix) (2010)
- Freddy Todd - Can't Fathom This (Om Unit Remix) (2010)
- V.I.V.E.K - Over My Head (Om Unit Remix) (2013)
- Congo Natty - Get Ready VIP (Om Unit Remix) (2013)
- Above & Beyond - Sticky Fingers (Om Unit Remix) (2014)
- UZ & 12th Planet - Trap Shit V21 (Om Unit Remix) (2015)
- Machinedrum - Gunshotta (Om Unit's Rollers VIP) (2015)
- J:Kenzo - Ruffhouse (Om Unit Remix) (2016)
- Nomine - Blind Man (Om Unit Remix) (2016)
