= DJ Chefal =

British musician

- Origin: Croydon, London, England
- Genres: Dubstep
- Occupations: DJ, producer
- Years active: 2000–present
- Labels: Sub Freq, Tempa, Sin City, Ringo, Soul Jazz, Subbalicious
- Website: djchefal.co.uk

DJ Chefal is an English dubstep DJ from South London. XLR8R has called him "One of U.K. pirate radio’s biggest dubstep DJs". He is an employee of Transition Mastering Studio, which XLR8R called "dubstep’s most renowned acetate-cutting studio." In 2010 Chef, Plastician and P Money represented for London on the BBC Dubstep Soundclash and won.

Chefal has been hosting a weekly Radio Show on London's Rinse FM for the last eight years.
