= Goth-Trad =

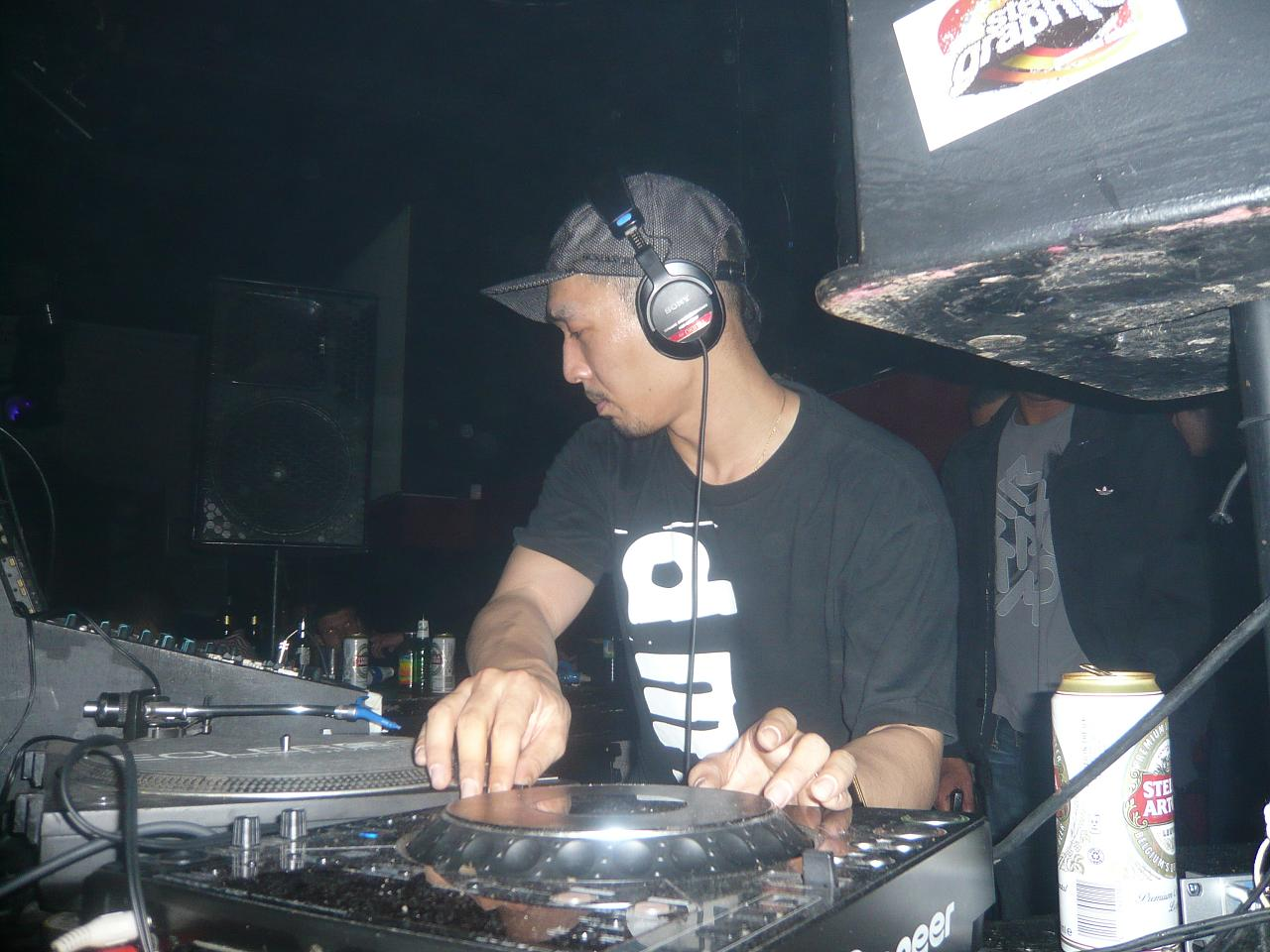
- Goth-Trad performing at DMZ, London, in May 2008

Background information
- Born: Takeaki Maruyama
- Genres: Dubstep
- Occupations: Producer, DJ
- Labels: Deep Medi, Body Electric Records, Popgroup Recordings
- Website: Official Website

Takeaki Maruyama, better known by his stage name Goth-Trad, is a Japanese dubstep musician. He began composing dubstep in 2005 after being inspired by Wiley's "Morgue". As of 2022, he has released 6 studio albums. His last album New Epoch was released on Mala's Deep Medi label.

Goth-Trad also runs an underground music night in Shibuya, Tokyo, called "Back To Chill". He has also experimented with other genres and styles in more recent years.

== Discography ==
- 2003 - GOTH-TRAD I
- 2005 - The Inverted Perspective
- 2005 - Mad Raver's Dance Floor
- 2012 - New Epoch
- 2016 - PSIONICS
- 2021 - SURVIVAL RESEARCH
