= Tempa Recordings =

UK record label

- Parent company: Ammunition Promotion
- Founded: 2000
- Founder: Neil Jolliffe
- Genre: Dubstep; UK garage
- Country of origin: UK
- Location: London, England

Tempa is a garage and dubstep music label founded in 2000 by Neil Jolliffe, who also coined the term "dubstep" in 2002.

The label, along with Big Apple Records, and parent label Ammunition, was part of the formation of dubstep as a genre.

A key member and the face of Tempa Recordings is DJ and producer Youngsta, who has been in charge of artists and repertoire for the label since its inception.

The label's biggest release is the "Midnight Request Line" by Skream which was released in 2005.

== Artists ==
- Alex Coulton
- Amit
- Appleblim
- Artwork
- AxH
- Benga
- Benny Ill
- Biome
- Cimm
- Cliques
- Coki (Digital Mystikz)
- Cosmin TRG
- D1
- Data
- DJ Distance
- Dub War
- El-B
- Facta
- Goldspot Productions
- Hatcha
- Headhunter
- High Plains Drifter
- Hodge
- Horsepower Productions
- Ipman
- J Da Flex
- J:Kenzo
- Killawatt
- Kode9
- LX One
- Magnetic Man
- Markee Ledge
- Nomine
- Osiris Jay
- Parris
- Proxima
- Quest
- SP:MC
- Sam Frank
- Seven
- Silkie
- Skeptical
- Skream
- Slikback
- Soap Dodgers
- TRG
- The Culprit
- The Spaceape
- Truth
- Wen
- Youngsta
