= Juakali =

- Genres: Dubstep
- Labels: Foreign Familiar
- Website: Foreignfamiliar.com

Juakali is a singer and MC from Trinidad. He is known primarily for his musical output in the dubstep and reggae genres. Onstage since the age of 14, Juakali started his career as a dancer and, at one stage, a poet. He has released two albums. BBC Radio 1's Mary Anne Hobbs invited Juakali for one of her live session shows at the BBC studio in London.

Juakali is a resident in Los Angeles, California, United States. He has traveled the world in recent years performing, and collaborating with other musicians. In 2006, following his performances at concerts aligned to the FIFA World Cup, Ego magazine described Juakali as an artist "on the forefront of the reggae, jungle and burgeoning dubstep scene in the US and around the world."

Juakali was the host of North America's first and premier dubstep event, 'Dub War in New York City', reviewed by The New York Times. He also performed with Sub Swara, a live electronic crew based in New York City that "deals with the most fascinating melt of sound – beats and bass laced with the elemental voice of Juakali... pure heaven." (Mary Anne Hobbs, BBC Radio 1).

He has appeared on commercial recordings from Alpha & Omega, Raz Mesani, Pinch, Stat Zro, and Dub Gabriel. His debut solo EP was Breakground on GunJah Records/Foreign Familiar (2008). Come From Yard is his more recent EP release (2009).

The term 'Juakali' is also an expression for the Kenyan informal sector, which comes from the Swahili term 'jua kali' ('the hot sun') referring to the typical outdoor situation of such entrepreneurs. It often also refers more specifically to street vendors and artisans in Kenya.
