= Silkie (musician) =

English dubstep producer (born 1986)

- Born: Solomon Rose; April 15, 1986 (age 40); Hammersmith, West London, England
- Genres: Dubstep; UK garage
- Occupations: Producer; DJ
- Years active: 2002–present
- Labels: Deep Medi; Antisocial; Bedroom Rat
- Website: antisocialrecords.co.uk

Solomon Rose (born April 15, 1986), known professionally as Silkie, is an English dubstep and UK garage producer and DJ from London. He has released several extended plays and albums with Deep Medi Musik and formed the record labels Antisocial Records in 2004 and Bedroom Rat Records in 2023.

== Biography ==
Solomon Rose was born on April 15, 1986 in Hammersmith, a district of West London in England, to British Jamaican parents. He got into music in 1999 after discovering UK garage artists Oxide & Neutrino and the So Solid Crew through pirate radio stations. He began experimenting with producing grime music with FL Studio by 2001, releasing his first single "Dark Square" the following year as a collaboration with schoolmate Harry Craze under the alias of Grimey Beetz. The track would receive play at the London night club FWD, where he would discover dubstep music and change his pseudonym to Silkie. He co-founded Antisocial Entertainment, later renamed Antisocial Records, in 2004 and began playing his music on the London-based community radio station Rinse FM. He produced "No Help or Handouts" for the grime collective Unorthodox in 2004, which featured his brother Silva and rapper NoLay.

Silkie began to produce mostly dubstep music under the label Deep Medi Musik by 2008 and released his first album, City Limits Volume 1, the following year. This was followed up by City Limits Volume 2 in 2011. Alongside several other singles and extended plays, he released his third album Fractals in 2015 and his fourth album Panorama in 2021. In 2023, Silkie began providing bass music production courses under the Antisocial Audio brand and formed the UK garage-focused label Bedroom Rat Records. He releases music for Bedroom Rat under his real name, Solomon Rose, while still producing dubstep.

== Production ==
Silkie produces music using the digital audio workstations Bitwig Studio, FL Studio, and Studio One.

== Discography ==
=== Studio albums ===
- City Limits Volume 1 (Deep Medi, 2009)
- City Limits Volume 2 (Deep Medi, 2011)
- Fractals (Anarchostar, 2015)
- Panorama (Deep Medi, 2021)

=== Extended plays ===
- Order (Antisocial, 2004)
- Sign of da Future (Antisocial, 2005)
- City Limits Volume 1.6 - 1.8 (Deep Medi, 2011)
- The Lost Tapes (Deep Medi, 2013)
- Bird in the Sky (Wheel & Deal, 2014)
- Don't Play Games (Antisocial, 2015)
- It Wasn't You (Deep Medi, 2016)
- Impervious (Deep Medi, 2018)
- NCDIG006 (Navy Cut, 2022)

=== Singles ===
- "Dark Square" (self-published, 2002)
- "Hooby / I Sed" (Deep Medi, 2008)
- "Jazz Dubstep / Primal Dub" (Sonic Boom, 2008)
- "Skys the Limit / Poltigiest" (Deep Medi, 2008)
- "Favela / French Knickers" (Break The Habit, 2008)
- "Purple Love / Test" (Deep Medi, 2009)
- "Illegal Immigrant / Step Aside" (Cloqworq, 2009)
- "City Limits Volume 1.2" (Deep Medi, 2010)
- "City Limits Volume 1.4" (Deep Medi, 2010)
- "Neckback / Tribal" (Deep Medi, 2013)
- "Drunken Master / Why Not" (Antisocial, 2017)
- "Don't DJ for Free" (Pretty Weird, 2018)
- "BRR001" (Bedroom Rat, 2023)
- "BRR001 Mixes" (Bedroom Rat, 2024)
- "Do Without / Neon" (Bedroom Rat, 2024)
- "Kolo / Real Deal" (Antisocial, 2024)
- "Techno Ranger / What You Need" (Antisocial, 2025)
- "I Need / Put Me Down" (Antisocial, 2025)
- "Got U Burning Up / Come Home" (Bedroom Rat, 2025)
