= DJ Hatcha =

British producer and DJ

Hatcha
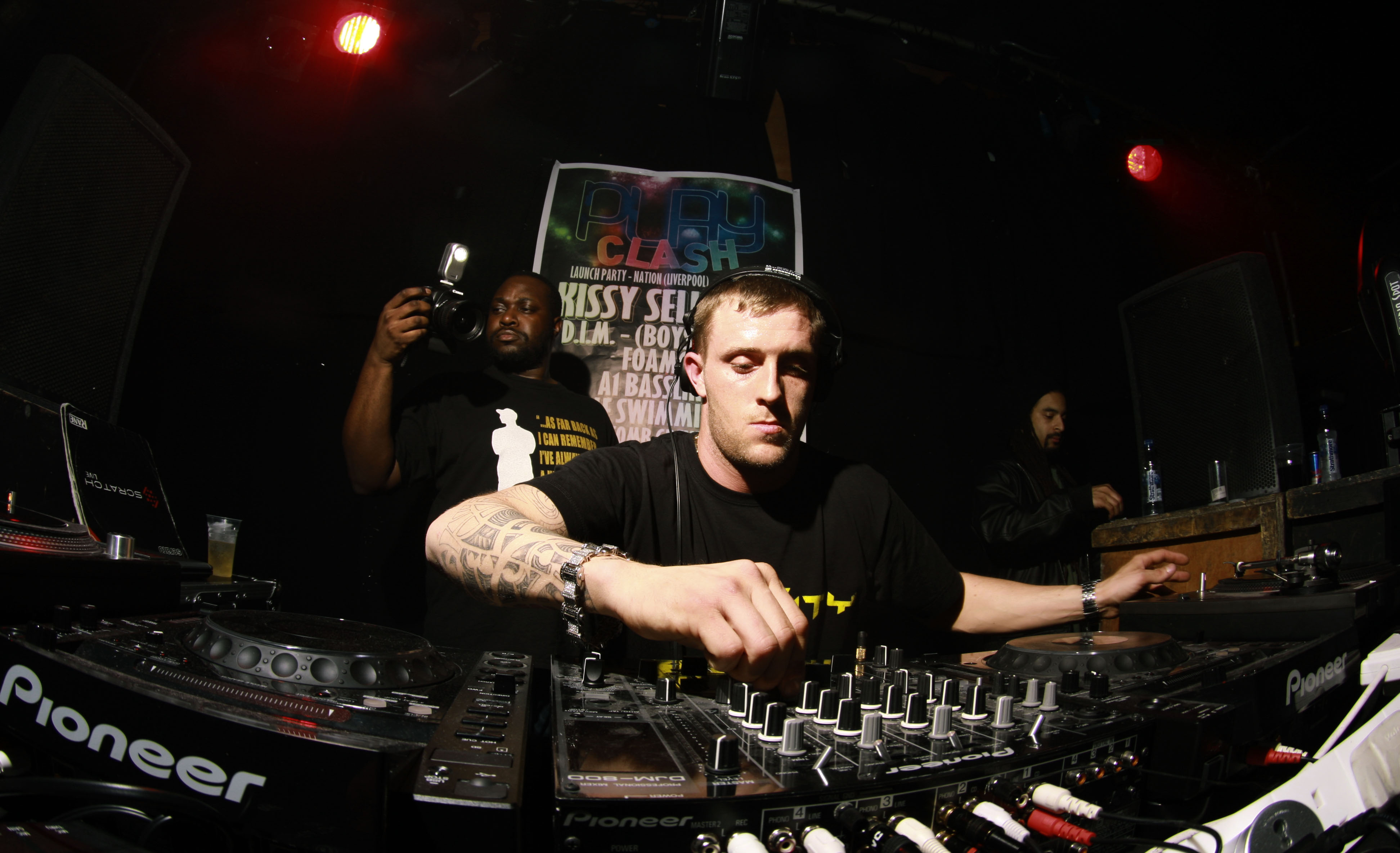
- Hatcha mixing live in 2008

Background information
- Birth name: Terry Leonard
- Origin: Croydon, London, England
- Genres: Dubstep
- Occupation(s): Producer, DJ
- Labels: Tempa, Planet Mu

Terry Leonard, better known as DJ Hatcha or simply Hatcha, is a South London producer and DJ notable for his seminal work in the musical genre dubstep. He had a regular show on the prominent pirate radio station Rinse FM in the early 2000s, before bringing dubstep to a wider audience with his regular show on mainstream radio station Kiss FM.

== Biography ==
Leonard was the head buyer of the Big Apple record shop in Croydon, South London, which he ran alongside Arthur Smith (a.k.a. Artwork of Magnetic Man) and John Kennedy. A movement within the 2-step garage scene by the name of "dark garage" was taking place at the start of the 2000s, and producers at the forefront of it such as El-B and Horsepower Productions were regulars at the shop, which had become a meeting point within the scene. At the time Leonard was an influential DJ on various pirate radio stations and a resident at the club FWD>>, where a strain of dark garage that was more stripped down and bass heavy was gaining popularity.

Oliver Jones (Skream), got in touch with Leonard through his brother (producer Hijak), and started working in the shop during the weekends. Leonard played him dark garage sounds, which sparked Jones's interest in producing music. Through working in the shop he met Adegbenga Adejumo (Benga), another young producer who was making tunes using his PlayStation gaming console. The two exchanged music and were developing their style under the mentor-ship of Leonard, who had also started to bring dubplates of the tunes Jones and Adejumo were making into his DJ-sets. His sets at FWD>> and on Rinse FM were very influential in forming dubstep, partially thanks to the exclusive music he got from the young producers, as well as that provided by shop regulars Mala, Coki and Loefah (the former two known as duo Digital Mystikz).

== Discography ==
=== Selected singles/EPs ===
- "Bashment" (self-released, 2001)
- "Dub Express" (Tempa, 2003)
- Special 4 track EP w/ Benny Ill (Tempa, 2003)
- "10 Tons Heavy" w/ Benga (Planet Mu, 2006)
- "Just a Rift" / "Chillz" (Eight:FX, 2008)
- "Dirtee Tek" / "Dark Claps" (Special Branch, 2010)

=== Compilations/mixes ===
- Dubstep Allstars Vol. 1 (Tempa, 2004)
- Dubstep Allstars Vol. 4 w/ Youngsta (Tempa, 2006)
