= Distance (musician) =

British dubstep producer and DJ

- Born: Greg Sanders
- Origin: London, England
- Genre: Dubstep
- Occupations: Producer; DJ
- Years active: 2003–present
- Labels: Chestplate; Planet Mu; Boka; Tectonic
- Website: chestplate.co.uk

Distance (born Greg Sanders) is a British dubstep producer and DJ. He also founded the record label Chestplate, whose sonic direction followed his style, fusing dubstep with metal influences.

Distance's involvement in Mary Anne Hobbs' 2006 BBC Radio 1 Dubstep Warz show lead to wider notoriety for him and also the genre as a whole. He is also known for having worked with artists such as Skream and Benga. His style is noted for being dark and full of distortion.

Distance founded Chestplate in 2007, releasing material from artists including Skream, Caspa & Rusko, Benga, Cyrus, Tunnidge, and Razor Rekta.

Distance biggest commercial breakthrough was the single Falling featuring Alys Be, reaching no.35 on the UK charts in April 2011.

== Discography ==
=== Albums ===
- My Demons (2007)
- Repercussions (2008)
- Dynamis (2016)
- Forgotten Demons (2021)

=== Extended plays ===
- Trust My Logic/Horizon (2003)
- Nomad (2004)
- Studio Gangsters (2004)
- Closer than you think (2004)
- Replicant (2005)
- 1 on 1/Empire (2005)
- Bahl Fwd/Temptations (with Skream) (2006)
- Travels/Wiseman (with Skream) (2006)
- Traffic/Cyclops (2006)
- Fallen/Taipan (2006)
- Feel me/Battle sequence (2007)
- Political Warfare/Radical (with Skream) (2007)
- Fallen (Vex'd remix) (2007)
- Aqualung/Nomad (Scuba remix) (2007)
- Headstrung/No sunshine (2008)
- V/Present day (2008)
- Victim Support/Misfit (2008)
- Violate/Silence (2008) (with Cyrus)
- Night Vision/Traffic (remixes) (2009)
- Twilight/V (Pinch remix) (2009)
- Clockwork/One Blood, One source (Distance remix) (with Pinch) (2009)
- Choke Hold/Surrender (with Benga and Cyrus) (2009)
- Skys Alight/ 1 Regret (2009)
- Menace/Beyond (2010)
- Falling (featuring Alys Be) (2010)
- No warning/Jungle fears (2010)
- Meanstreak (2011)
- A result of sound/ Desterted (2012)
- Blue Meanie/Searching (2012)
- Reboot/Bazurk (2012)
- Aftershock/Blame (with Tunnidge) (2012)
- Troubles/Rugged (2012)
- Set you free/Gorilla Force (2013)
- Outer Limits (2014)
- Long Live the Groove (2015)
- Survivors (2016)
- Clash/Scratch The Surface (2017)
- Awaken (2019)
- Sacrifices (2021)
