= Loefah =

Loefah Loefah
- Also known as: ASBO (with SGT. Pokes)
- Born: Peter Livingston; 8 September 1980 (age 45)
- Origin: Croydon
- Genres: Dubstep, UK garage
- Occupations: Producer, DJ, Label Owner
- Labels: Swamp 81, Ital, 81

Peter Livingston (born 8 September 1980), known professionally as Loefah, is one of the pioneering founders of dubstep most notable for his releases on one of the genre's founding labels, DMZ. Loefah started off collaborating with the Digital Mystikz on the DMZ nights run in Brixton and was part of Mary Anne Hobbs' Dubstep Warz radio show that contributed to breaking the genre to the mainstream. He was known for having a dark and minimal style that used powerful basslines and menacing vocal samples in order to create a sense of dread.

In around 2007 Loefah began to fall out of love with the genre. In 2009 he founded the record label Swamp 81 which originally released dubstep records by the likes of Kryptic Minds and Skream. However, following the release of Addison Groove's "Footcrab", the label began to focus on an increasingly wider spectrum of Bass music. His label holds a regular show on Rinse FM.

== Loefah Discography (Singles and EPs) ==
Release	Label	Year	Format
Dubsession (with Digital Mystikz)	DMZ	2004	12"/Digital
Jungle Infiltrator	Big Apple Records	2004	12"
Twisup/B (with Digital Mystikz)	DMZ	2004	12"/Digital
28g (with Skream)	Tectonic	2005	12"/CD/Digital
Da Wrath (Souljahz Vip Mix) / Twisup (Vip) (with Mala)	DMZ	2005	12"/Digital
Root/Goat Stare	DMZ	2005	12"/Digital
System/Molten (with Digital Mystikz)	DMZ	2005	12"/Digital
Mud/Rufage	DMZ	2006	12"/Digital
Voodoo	Six6six	2006	12"
Disko Rekah/All of a Sudden (with Coki)	Deep Medi Musik	2007	12"/Digital
Sukkah/Warrior stance vs.Darqwan	Texture records	2007	12"/Digital
Yours	Ringo Records	2007	12"/Digital
Broken/Paranormal Activity (with Pinch and Roska)	Tectonic	2011	12"/Digital
Western (Did a Skank)	Swamp 81	2013	12"
Midnight/Woman	Berceuse Heroique	2014	12"
Natural Charge/Crack Bong Rmx	Version	2020	12”/Digital
