= Skream =

English electronic music producer

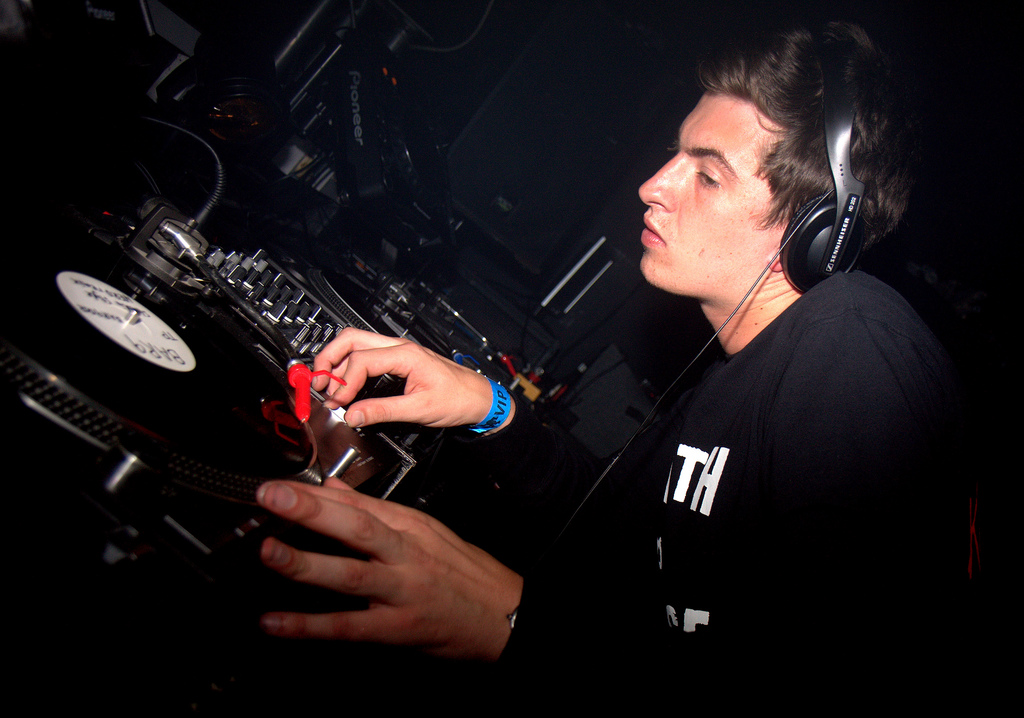
- Skream in 2009

Background information
- Born: Oliver Dene Jones; 1 June 1986 (age 40); West Wickham, London, England
- Origin: Bromley, South London, England
- Genres: Dubstep; UK garage; dub; disco; house; techno; drum and bass; jungle; grime
- Occupations: Record producer; DJ
- Instruments: Music sequencer; samplers; drum machine; personal computer; turntables
- Years active: 2002–present
- Labels: Tempa; Tectonic; Disfigured Dubz; Deep Medi Musik; Owsla; Nonplus
- Member of: Magnetic Man

Oliver Dene Jones (born 1 June 1986), known professionally as Skream, is an English electronic music producer based in Bromley. Skream has released records on several British record labels, such as Tempa, Tectonic, and Big Apple Records, and has performed throughout Europe, the US, Canada, Australia, and Japan, as well as the UK. Skream is known as an early and influential architect of the dubstep genre.

Skream and longtime collaborators Artwork and Benga co-founded a music group called Magnetic Man. Their debut album, Magnetic Man was released in 2010.

Since 2013, Skream has primarily focused on house music and disco.

== Origins ==
Jones was born in West Wickham, Bromley, London. As a teenager, he worked at Big Apple Records, a Croydon-based record store that was at the centre of the early dubstep scene; even prior to this, Jones had become acquainted with Hatcha, another dubstep pioneer, because Jones' brother worked on an adjacent floor in Big Apple Records. As a result of this encounter, Hatcha was the first DJ to play Skream dubplates.

He began producing music at the age of 15, (using FruityLoops) and later claimed to have roughly 8,000 tracks in various stages of development. He reports that he was frequently truant when he was a teenager, and spent a considerable amount of time at Big Apple Records. On occasion he attended FWD, a club night that was first hosted at the Velvet Rooms but later moved to Plastic People in Shoreditch.

== Career ==
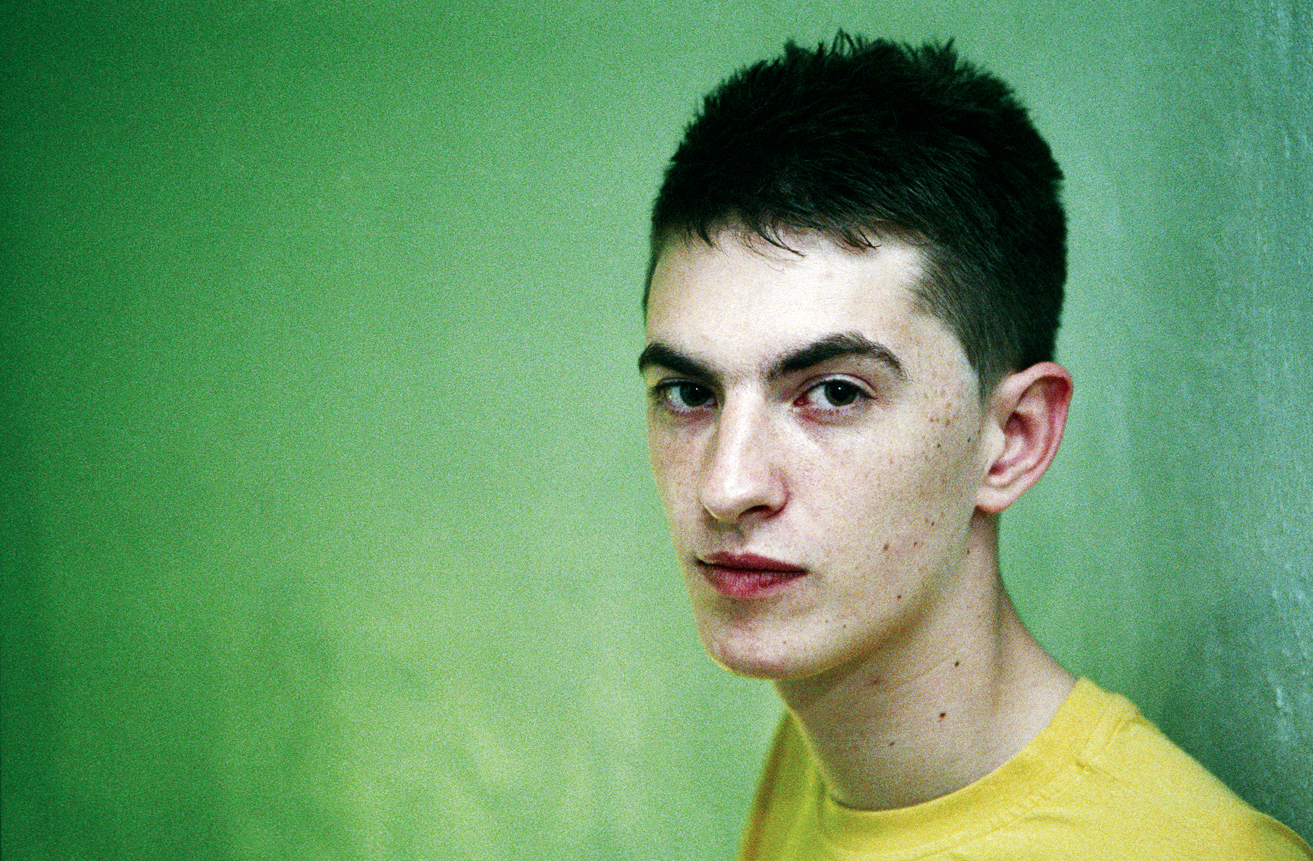
Skream in 2009

Skream's early productions were stark and sinister works he co-produced with another frequenter of Big Apple, Benga. Together, they produced several tracks that Big Apple Records published on two EPs: The Judgment in 2003, and Hydro in 2004. One of his first solo singles, 2005's "Midnight Request Line," has been credited as a key factor in the evolution of a more melodic sound in the dubstep music. Justin Hampton of the LA Times called the track "dubstep's most recognizable crossover hit". and has been praised by producers as diverse as grime producer Wiley, and minimal techno producer Ricardo Villalobos. A writer for The Wire wrote that the song has "an epic change of key and tempo that recall[s] the classicist mannerisms of Derrick May."

As dubstep attracted the attention of mainstream media outlets such as The Guardian and Pitchfork Media, Jones' music started to diverge from the darker, UK garage-influenced sound of early dubstep artists such as Horsepower Productions, and to incorporate elements of dub and house music.

In 2006, after producing several singles, he released his first full-length album, Skream!, considered to be one of the more influential entries in the early dubstep period. Around the same time, he began hosting a weekly Rinse FM show called Stella Sessions. In 2010, Benga joined the broadcast, which was renamed The Skream and Benga Show.

In 2007, "Angry" and "Colourful" from Skream!, as well as an exclusive mix, were featured in the E4 teen drama Skins. This marked the first instance dubstep was featured on television. Skream was also featured on BBC Radio 1's Essential Mix that same year.

In September 2008, Harmless released Watch the Ride, an album mixed by Skream. On 2 October 2008 Skream featured in a fly-on-the-wall German TV show Durch die Nacht mit … alongside drum and bass artist Goldie. In this, Skream stated that he currently had writer's block, but he was working on music in other genres, also mentioning a possible Skream and Goldie collaboration.

Writing for The Guardian in 2009, music journalist Tim Jonze attributed the success of La Roux's single "In for the Kill" to Skream's remix, "Let's Get Ravey".

In 2010, Tempa Records released Skream's second album, Outside the Box. Spin magazine rated the album 7 out of 10. Later that year, further commercial success was seen through the release of Magnetic Man, the debut album under the live electronic music project with fellow dubstep pioneers Benga and Artwork. The album peaked at number 5 on the UK Albums Chart and its lead single, "I Need Air" reached number 10 on the UK Singles Chart.

In January 2011, he and Benga left Rinse to replace Alex Metric in his 'In New DJs We Trust' slot on BBC Radio 1. The duo was eventually given a weekly slot on Radio 1, which began in April 2012.

Jones has worked with many prominent pop artists. In addition to La Roux, he has produced for and collaborated with the likes of Kelis, Miles Kane, and Chromeo, as well as Katy B and John Legend as part of Magnetic Man.

In response to his success, Jones launched his Skreamizm tour to offer himself a change of pace from arena and festival performances, opting to play three-hour sets in small clubs. These shows saw a greater incorporation of disco, house, and techno in his sets. Productions from this time period increasingly veered away from dubstep into these various genres, seen in tracks such as "Sticky," "Bang That" and "Kreepin'". He addressed the change in direction on his Twitter and in interviews, noting that he was inspired to do more varied sets by the likes of Jackmaster. In March 2013, he contributed a house mix to Pete Tong's All Gone Miami 2013 on Defected Records, a leading house label that releases yearly compilations dedicated to Miami and Ibiza. Resident Advisor wrote that with the release, he gained "entry to one of the most established institutions in house music."

In 2023, Skream returned to the stage with Benga and SGT Pokes for the first time in 10 years at the Fabric club in London. Following this show, additional shows were announced for April 2024, to be held at The Black Box in Denver, Colorado.

In January 2025, Skream and Benga announced they had started a collaborative album together, their first collaborative work since Magnetic Man. Neither of them announced the name or release date of the project, and have since released two singles, "Good Things Come To Those Who Wait" in June and "Midnight Control" featuring Emily Makis in November. They would perform at another show together in November with Boiler Room in Melbourne.

In 2026, Skream and Benga released a collaborative remix of Fred Again and Amyl and the Sniffers' track "You're a Star", which featured on Fred Again's USB002 Remixes EP and premiered on the UKF Dubstep YouTube channel on 6 March.

== Personal life ==
In July 2011, Jones had his first child, a son.

Jones is the younger brother of jungle DJ and dubstep producer Hijak.

== Discography ==
=== Solo albums ===
- Skream! (2006)
- Outside the Box (2010)

=== With Magnetic Man ===
- Magnetic Man (2010)
