= Horsepower Productions =

British musical group

- Genres: 2-step garage, dubstep, dub
- Years active: 2000–present
- Labels: Tempa, Turn U On, On-U Sound
- Members: Benny Ill; Jay King
- Past members: Nasis (until 2002); Lev Jnr (until 2002)

Horsepower Productions are an English electronic music duo, initially a larger musical collective who released experimental garage recordings, and helped pioneer the dubstep genre.

== Lineup ==
The group was initially composed of Benny Ill (born Ben Garner), Jay King, Lev Jnr, Nasis and four other members. The eight were closely associated with the influential drum & bass record label No U Turn, and its UK garage-oriented sister label Turn U On.

Garner has since collaborated on the seminal "Fat Larry's Skank" track, which has been remixed and re-versioned many times by producers including Kode9, as well as collaborating with Hatcha on a number of tracks, DJing at FWD>>, and releasing more straightforward dub as part of the duo Bill & Ben.

After a five-year hiatus, Garner returned to Horsepower with new collaborator Jay King, with a 12" single, "Kingstep/Damn It" in 2009 and an LP in November 2010 entitled Quest for the Sonic Bounty, both on Tempa.

== Sound ==
Early Horsepower releases were resolutely UK garage in sound, but the mainly instrumental, dub versions which were often B-sides of these releases proved to be extremely influential; stripped-down, minimal re-versions, with the emphasis on shuffled, intricate, crisp percussion and subbass.

Meanwhile, Horsepower Productions' 12-inches and other similarly minded music experimenting with the garage archetype were staples in Croydon's Big Apple Records, a record shop staffed and frequented by many artists later to become extremely influential in the dubstep and grime genres. In 2002, as interest in the dubstep genre grew, Horsepower Productions released In Fine Style, a collection of earlier 12" releases on compact disc accompanied by six new tracks in a double twelve-inch pack. The LP has been described as the "origin" or "birth" of dubstep.

The duo's influence was acknowledged by the inclusion of several Horsepower Productions tracks on Tempa's 2006 Roots of Dubstep compilation.

== Critical reception ==
Music historian Simon Reynolds described Horsepower Productions as "pioneers" and their style as "sort of a minimalist move within UK garage almost bringing it more in line with techno aesthetic. Stripped-down, subtle. The buzzword would be deep."

The magazine Uncut also compared the track "The Swindle" on the album In Fine Style to early techno, praising the track's "immense vistas of space that owe more to Juan Atkins than Lee Perry."

Belinda Rowse for Juno Daily, praised Quest for the Sonic Bounty, stating that it "reaffirms once again that Horsepower are one of the most important and genre defining acts of our generation. A must have album." Rowse described how "a moody malaise seems to hover in the background throughout the album which is strangely enthralling."

== Discography ==
=== Studio albums ===
- In Fine Style (2002)
- To the Rescue (2004)
- Quest for the Sonic Bounty (2010)
- The Lost Tapes EP (2011)
- "Crooks, Crime & Corruption" (2016)

=== Singles ===
- "When You Hold Me" / "Let's Dance" (2000)
- "Gorgon Sound" / "Triple 7" (2000)
- "One You Need" (2001)
- "Vigilante" / "What We Do" (Remix) (2001)
- "Electro Bass" (2002)
- "Fist of Fury" / "To the Beat Y'all" (2002)
- "Smokin'" (PC Edit)/ "The Swindle" (2002)
- "Kingstep" / "Damn It" (2009)
- "Justify" / "Good Ole Dayz" (2011)
