= El-B =

- Also known as: L. Beadle
- Born: Lewis Beadle
- Origin: United Kingdom
- Genres: Hip hop, UK garage, dubstep
- Occupations: Music producer, DJ
- Years active: 1996–present
- Labels: Ghost Recordings, Scorpion Records

Lewis Beadle, professionally known as El-B, is an English record producer, songwriter and DJ. He was an original member of the UK Garage duo Groove Chronicles, and is commonly seen as one of the pioneers of the dubstep genre. He runs the Ghost Recordings label and is also part of the duo El-Tuff. Upon the release of his album The Roots of El-B in 2008, El-B has regularly toured and performed live as well as having released digital and vinyl formatted music.

== Discography ==
=== 12" releases ===
- 2000: "Bubble" (Scorpion Records)
- 2000: "Digital" (Locked On)
- 2000: "El-Brand"
- 2000: El-Breaks Vol. 1 (El-Breaks)
- 2000: "Ghetto Girl" (Scorpion Records)
- 2000: "Rhythm's Gonna Get You"
- 2000: "Wicked Sound" (Soldiers of Fortune)
- 2001: "Breakbeat Science" (Bison Recordings)
- 2001: El-Breaks Vol. 2 (El-Breaks)
- 2001: "Keep the Love" (Scorpion Records)
- 2001: "Serious" (Locked On)
- 2002: "Buck & Bury"/"Back2Me" (Ghost)
- 2002: "Shorty" (Ghost)
- 2004: El-Breaks Vol. 3 (El-Breaks)
- 2004: Kushti Kutz Vol. 5 (Kushti Kutz)
- 2004: "The E.Q. Project" (Qualifide Recordings)
- 2007: "Endorse & Set It" (Ghost)
- 2007: Ghost Rider EP (Heavy Artillery)
- 2008: "Beautiful Sounds" (Qualifide Records)
- 2009: "Ammunition & Blackdown Present: The Roots of El-B" (Tempa)
- 2009: "Jah No Dead"/"Son De Cali" (Soul Motive)
- 2010: Dirty EP (Night Audio)
- 2010: "Think Ur Greezy"/"Knucklin" (Ghost, Thriller Funk)
- 2011: The Dirty EP (Night Audio)
- 2012: "Romp" (Ghost)
- 2013: "Club Music" (Bison Recordings)
- 2015: The Virus Volume 2 ( Sunflower Records)
- 2015: Grinnin' Beats Vol.1 (Grinnin' Records)
- 2015: "Running \ See Me Through" (Vex Records)
- 2016: "Attitude" (Four40 Records)
- 2016: "Send Me Love" (Northern Line)
- 2020: "Wake the Neighbours"
- 2020: "Move It / Beach Groove / London Underground"
- 2020: "Brixton 2 Croydon / City Life / Dusk Til Dawn / Streatham Bop" (GD4YA)
- 2020: "RIPROXY" (Ghost)
- 2020: "Mista Say So / Killa Sound / Slam" (Ghost)
- 2021: "Southside Summer / Wooly Road Creep / Love Life / Lost" (GD4YA)
- 2021: "All the Colours / 5am in Vauxhall / Southbank Slide" (Majikal)
- 2021: "Get with the Times / Get It Up / El's Groove PT 2"
- 2021: "Blitz (Hodge Remix) / Broadway G (El-B Remix)" (GD4YA)
