= Dubstep =

Genre of electronic dance music that originated in South London

- Stylistic origins: 2-step; UK garage; dub; breakbeat; grime; reggae; jungle; drum and bass
- Cultural origins: Early 2000s, London, England, United Kingdom
- Derivative forms: Brostep; future garage; post-dubstep; riddim; trap music (EDM)

Other topics
- List of musicians

Dubstep is a genre of electronic dance music and bass music that originated in South London in the early 2000s. The style, whose roots trace to the Jamaican sound system party scene in the early 1980s, emerged as a UK garage offshoot that blended 2-step rhythms and sparse dub production, as well as incorporating elements of broken beat, grime, and drum and bass.

Dubstep is generally characterised by syncopated rhythmic patterns, prominent basslines, and a dark tone. In 2001, this underground sound and other strains of garage music began to be promoted at the London nightclub Plastic People, at the "Forward" night (sometimes stylised as FWD>>), and on the pirate radio station Rinse FM. The term dubstep first appeared in 2001, and was then used by labels such as Big Apple and Tempa from 2002 to describe remixes more distinct from 2-step and grime.

BBC Radio 1 DJ John Peel started playing dubstep in 2003. In 2004, the last year of his show, a listeners vote included songs by Distance, Digital Mystikz, and Plastician as the top 50 for the year. Dubstep started to enter mainstream British popular culture when it spread beyond small local scenes in late 2005 and early 2006; many websites devoted to the genre appeared on the Internet and aided the growth of the scene, such as dubstepforum, the download site Barefiles and blogs such as gutterbreakz. Simultaneously, the genre was receiving extensive coverage in music magazines such as The Wire and online publications such as Pitchfork, with a regular feature entitled The Month In: Grime/Dubstep. Interest in dubstep grew after BBC Radio 1 DJ Mary Anne Hobbs launched her "Dubstep Warz" show in January 2006.

Towards the end of the 2000s and into the early 2010s, the genre started to become more commercially successful in the UK, with more singles and remixes entering the music charts. Music journalists and critics also noticed a dubstep influence in several pop artists' work. Around this time, producers also began to fuse elements of the original dubstep sound with other influences, creating fusion genres including future garage and the slower and more experimental post-dubstep. The harsher electro-house and heavy metal-influenced variant brostep, led by American producers such as Skrillex, boosted dubstep's popularity in the United States.

== Characteristics ==
Dubstep rhythm example
Excerpt demonstrating the rhythmic tension generated between the drum rhythm and bassline. This song features a very sparse rhythm almost entirely composed of kick drum, snare drum, and a sparse hi-hat, with a distinctly half time implied 71bpm tempo. The track is instead propelled by a sub-bass following a four-to-the-floor 142bpm pattern.

The music website AllMusic has described dubstep's overall sound as "tightly coiled productions with overwhelming bass lines and reverberant drum patterns, clipped samples, and occasional vocals." According to Simon Reynolds, dubstep's constituents originally came from "different points in the 1989—99 UK lineage: bleep 'n' bass, jungle, techstep, Photek-style neurofunk, speed garage, [and] 2 step." Reynolds comments that the traces of pre-existing styles "worked through their intrinsic sonic effects but also as signifiers, tokenings-back addressed to those who know".

Dubstep's early roots are in the more experimental releases of UK garage producers, seeking to incorporate elements of drum and bass into the 2-step garage sound. These experiments often ended up on the B-side of a white label or commercial garage release. Dubstep is generally instrumental. Similar to a vocal garage hybrid – grime – the genre's feel is commonly dark; tracks frequently use a minor key or the Phrygian mode, and can feature dissonant harmonies such as the tritone interval within a riff. Compared to other styles of garage music, dubstep tends to be more minimalistic, focusing on prominent sub-bass frequencies. Some dubstep artists have also incorporated a variety of outside influences, from dub-influenced techno such as Basic Channel to classical music or heavy metal.

A softer and more melodic offshoot of dubstep, known as chillstep, also emerged in the late 2000s. It incorporates elements of ambient and chill out music.

=== Rhythm ===
Dubstep rhythms are usually syncopated, and often shuffled or incorporating tuplets. The tempo is nearly always in the range of 132–142 beats per minute, with a clap or snare usually inserted every third beat in a bar. With a large majority of releases at 140bpm, the genre (as well as others, including grime) is sometimes referred to as "140". In its early stages, dubstep was often more percussive, with more influences from two‑step drum patterns. Many producers were also experimenting with tribal drum samples, such as Loefah's early release "Truly Dread" and Mala's "Anti-War Dub".

In an Invisible Jukebox interview with The Wire, Kode9 commented on a MRK1 track, observing that listeners "have internalized the double-time rhythm" and the "track is so empty it makes [the listener] nervous, and you almost fill in the double time yourself, physically, to compensate".

=== Wobble bass ===
One characteristic of certain strands of dubstep is the wobble bass, often referred to as the "wub", where an extended bass note is manipulated rhythmically. This style of bass is typically produced by using a low-frequency oscillator to manipulate certain parameters of a synthesiser such as volume, distortion or filter cutoff. The resulting sound is a timbre that is punctuated by rhythmic variations in volume, filter cutoff, or distortion. This style of bass is a driving factor in some variations of dubstep, particularly at the more club-friendly end of the spectrum. Wobble bass has been nicknamed Wobble-step.

=== Structure ===
Originally, dubstep releases had some structural similarities to other genres like drum and bass and UK garage. Typically, this would comprise an intro, a main section (often incorporating a bass drop), a midsection, a second main section similar to the first (often with another drop), and an outro.

Many early dubstep tracks incorporate one or more "bass drops", a characteristic inherited from drum and bass. Typically, the percussion will pause, often reducing the track to silence, and then resume with more intensity, accompanied by a dominant sub-bass. It is very common for the bass to drop either after the 16th or 32nd measure of a song. However, this (or the existence of a bass drop in general) is by no means a completely rigid characteristic, rather a trope; a large portion of seminal tunes from producers like Kode9 and Horsepower Productions have more experimental song structures which do not rely on a drop for a dynamic peak – and in some instances do not feature a bass drop at all.

=== Cultural elements ===
Rewinds (or reloads) are another technique used by dubstep DJs. If a song seems to be especially popular then someone, most often the DJ, will rewind the record by hand without lifting the stylus and play the track again. Because the stylus has not been lifted (or, on electronic turntables, the channel has not been muted), a whirring noise is produced. Rewinds are also an important live element in many of dubstep's precursors; the technique originates in dub reggae soundsystems, is widely employed by pirate radio stations and is also used at UK garage and jungle nights.

Taking direct cues from Jamaica's lyrically sparse deejay and toasting mic styles, associated with reggae pioneers like U-Roy, the MC's role in dubstep's live experience is critically important to its impact.

Notable mainstays in the live experience of the sound are MC Sgt Pokes and MC Crazy D from London, and Juakali from Trinidad. Production in a studio environment seems to lend itself to more experimentation. Kode9 collaborated extensively with the Spaceape, who MCed in a dread poet style. Kevin Martin's experiments with the genre are almost exclusively collaborations with MCs such as Warrior Queen, Flowdan, and Tippa Irie. Skream has also featured Warrior Queen and grime artist JME on his debut album, Skream!. Plastician, who was one of the first DJ's to mix the sound of grime and dubstep together, has worked with notable grime setup Boy Better Know as well as renowned Grime MC's such as Wiley, Dizzee Rascal and Lethal Bizzle. He has also released tracks with a dubstep foundation and grime verses over the beats. Dubstep artist and label co-owner Sam Shackleton has moved toward productions which fall outside the usual dubstep tempo, and sometimes entirely lack most of the common tropes of the genre.

== History ==
=== 1999–2002: Origins ===
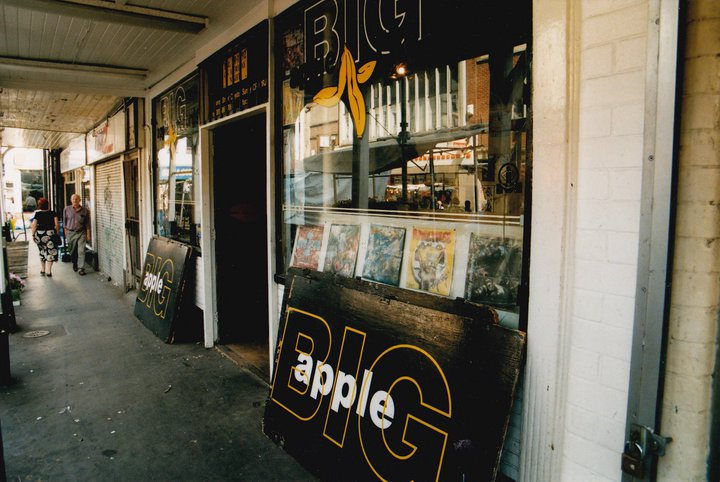
The Big Apple Records shop in Croydon, South London

The early sounds of proto-dubstep originally came out of productions during 1999–2000 by producers such as Oris Jay, El-B, Steve Gurley and Zed Bias. Neil Jolliffe of Tempa Recordings is reported to have coined the term "dubstep" in 2002, however the spaced form "dub step" was in use by early 2001. Ammunition Promotions, who run the influential club night Forward>> and have managed many proto-dubstep record labels (including Tempa, Soulja, Road, Vehicle, Shelflife, Texture, Lifestyle and Bingo), began to use the term "dubstep" to describe this style of music in around 2002. The term's use in a 2002 XLR8R cover story (featuring Horsepower Productions on the cover) contributed to it becoming established as the name of the genre.

Forward>> was originally held at the Velvet Rooms in London's Soho and later moved to Plastic People in Shoreditch, east London. Founded in 2001, Forward>> was critical to the development of dubstep, providing the first venue devoted to the sound and an environment in which dubstep producers could premier new music. Around this time, Forward>> was also incubating several other strains of dark garage hybrids, so much so that in the early days of the club the coming together of these strains was referred to as the "Forward>> sound". An online flyer from around this time encapsulated the Forward>> sound as "b-lines to make your chest cavity shudder."

Forward>> also ran a radio show on east London pirate station Rinse FM, hosted by Kode9. The original Forward>> line ups included Hatcha, Youngsta, Kode9 Zed Bias, Oris Jay, Slaughter Mob, Jay Da Flex, DJ Slimzee, and others, plus regular guests. The line up of residents has changed over the years to include Youngsta, Hatcha, Geeneus, and Plastician, with Crazy D as MC/host. Producers including D1, Skream and Benga make regular appearances.

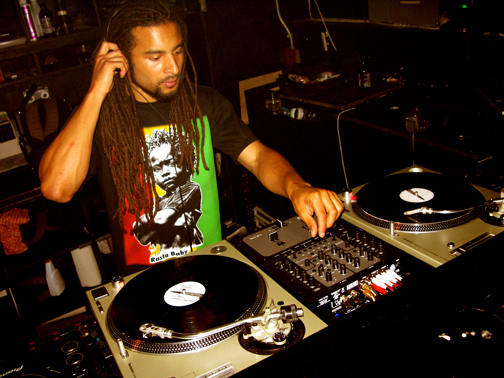
Mala of Digital Mystikz, one of the pioneers of dubstep music

Another crucial element in the early development of dubstep was the Big Apple Records record shop in Croydon. Key artists such as Hatcha and later Skream worked in the shop (which initially sold early UK Hardcore / Rave, Techno and House and later, garage and drum and bass, but evolved with the emerging dubstep scene in the area), while Digital Mystikz were frequent visitors. El-B, Zed Bias, Horsepower Productions, Plastician, N Type, Walsh and a young Loefah regularly visited the shop as well. The shop and its record label have since closed.

=== 2002–2005: Evolution ===
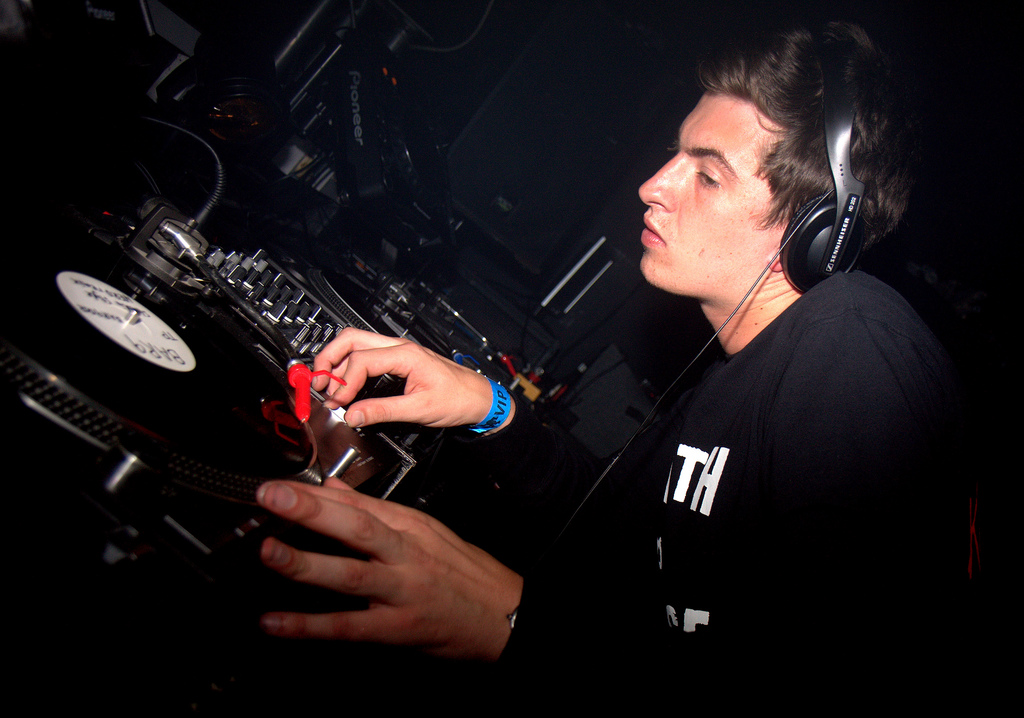
Dubstep producer Skream, one of the most widely known names on the scene since the beginning of the dubstep movement

Throughout 2003, DJ Hatcha pioneered a new direction for dubstep on Rinse FM and through his sets at Forward>>. Playing sets cut to 10" one-off reggae-style dubplates, he drew exclusively from a pool of new South London producers—first Benga and Skream, then also Digital Mystikz and Loefah—to begin a dark, clipped and minimal new direction in dubstep.

At the end of 2003, running independently from the pioneering FWD night, an event called Filthy Dub, co promoted by Plastician, and partner David Carlisle started happening regularly. It was there that Skream, Benga, N Type, Walsh, Chef, Loefah, and Cyrus made their debuts as DJs. South London collective Digital Mystikz (Mala and Coki), along with labelmates and collaborators Loefah and MC Sgt Pokes soon came into their own, bringing sound system thinking, dub values, and appreciation of jungle bass weight to the dubstep scene.

Digital Mystikz brought an expanded palette of sounds and influences to the genre, most prominently reggae and dub, as well as orchestral melodies. After releasing 12-inch singles on Big Apple, they founded DMZ Records, which has released fourteen 12"s to date. They also began their night DMZ, held every two months in Brixton, a part of London already strongly associated with reggae. DMZ has showcased new dubstep artists such as Skream, Kode9 , Benga, Pinch, DJ Youngsta, Hijak, Joe Nice, and Vex'd. DMZ's first anniversary event (at the Mass venue, a converted church) saw fans attending from places as far away as Sweden, the United States, and Australia, leading to a queue of 600 people at the event. This forced the club to move from its regular 400-capacity space to Mass' main room, an event cited as a pivotal moment in dubstep's history. Later Mala would also found the influential label Deep Medi Musik.

In 2004, Richard James' label, Rephlex, released two compilations that included dubstep tracks – the (perhaps misnamed) Grime and Grime 2. The first featured Plasticman, Mark One and Slaughter Mob, with Kode9, Loefah, and Digital Mystikz appearing on the second. These compilations helped to raise awareness of dubstep at a time when the grime sound was drawing more attention, and Digital Mystikz and Loefah's presence on the second release contributed to the success of their DMZ club night. Soon afterwards, the Independent on Sunday commented on "a whole new sound", at a time when both genres were becoming popular, stating that "grime" and "dubstep" were two names for the same style, which was also known as "sublow", "8-bar", and "eskibeat".

=== 2005–2008: Growth ===
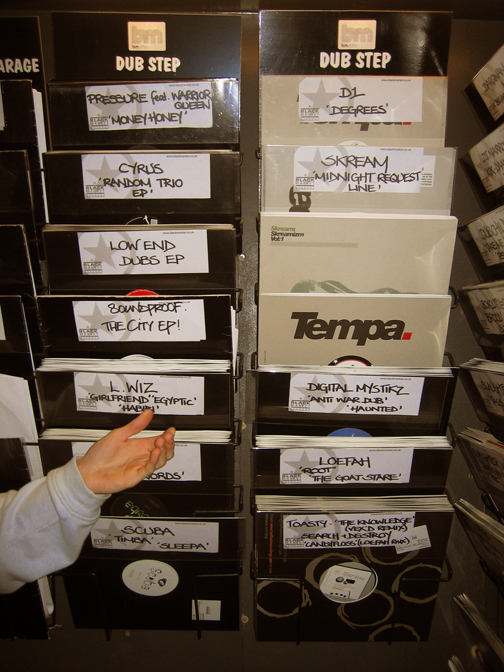
Dubstep Section at Black Market Records, Soho, London

In the summer of 2005, Forward>> brought grime DJs to the fore of the line up. Building on the success of Skream's grimey anthem "Midnight Request Line", the hype around the DMZ night and support from online forums (notably dubstepforum.com) and media, the scene gained prominence after Radio 1 DJ Mary Anne Hobbs gathered top figures from the scene for one show, entitled "Dubstep Warz", (later releasing the compilation album Warrior Dubz). The show created a new global audience for the scene, after years of exclusively UK underground buzz. Burial's self-titled album appearing in many critics' "Best of ..." lists for the year, notably The Wire's Best Album of 2006. The sound was also featured prominently in the soundtrack for the 2006 sci-fi film Children of Men, which included Digital Mystikz, Random Trio, Kode9 Pressure and DJ Pinch. Ammunition also released the first retrospective compilation of the 2000–2004 era of dubstep called The Roots of Dubstep, co-compiled by Ammunition and Blackdown on the Tempa Label.

The sound's first North American ambassador, Baltimore DJ Joe Nice helped kickstart its spread into the continent. Regular Dubstep club nights started appearing in cities like New York, San Francisco, Seattle, Montreal, Houston, and Denver, while Mary Anne Hobbs curated a Dubstep showcase at 2007's Sónar festival in Barcelona. Non-British artists have also won praise within the larger Dubstep community. The dynamic dubstep scene in Japan is growing quickly despite its cultural and geographical distance from the West. Such DJ/producers as Goth-Trad, Hyaku-mado, Ena and Doppelganger are major figures in the Tokyo scene. Joe Nice has played at DMZ, while the fifth instalment of Tempa's "Dubstep Allstars" mix series (released in 2007) included tracks by Finnish producer Tes La Rok and Americans JuJu and Matty G.

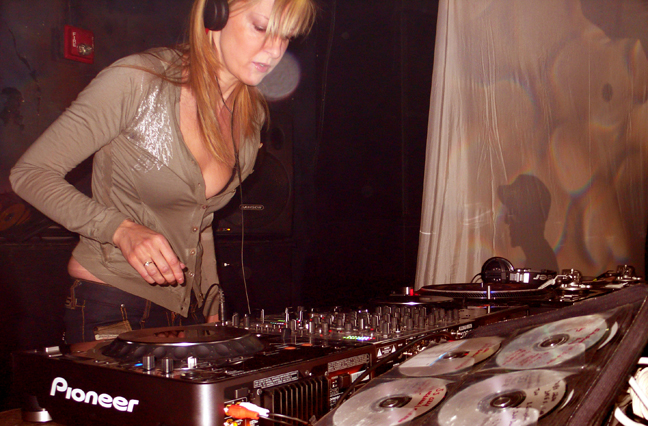
BBC Radio 1 DJ Mary Anne Hobbs

Techno artists and DJs began assimilating dubstep into their sets and productions. Shackleton's "Blood on My Hands" was remixed by minimal techno producer Ricardo Villalobos (an act reciprocated when Villalobos included a Shackleton mix on his "Vasco" EP) and included on a mix CD by Panoramabar resident Cassy. Ellen Allien and Apparat's 2006 song "Metric" (from the Orchestra of Bubbles album), Modeselektor's "Godspeed" (from the 2007's Happy Birthday! album, among other tracks on that same album) and Roman Flugel's remix of Riton's "Hammer of Thor" are other examples of dubstep-influenced techno. Berlin's Hard Wax record store (operated by influential dub techno artists Basic Channel) has also championed Shackleton's Skull Disco label, later broadening its focus to include other dubstep releases.

The summer of 2007 saw dubstep's musical palette expand further, with Benga and Coki scoring a crossover hit (in a similar manner to Skream's "Midnight Request Line") with the track "Night", which gained widespread play from DJs in a diverse range of genres. BBC Radio 1 DJ Gilles Peterson named it his record of 2007, and it was also a massive hit in the equally bassline-orientated, but decidedly more four-to-the-floor genre of bassline house, whilst Burial's late 2007 release Untrue (which was nominated for the 2008 Nationwide Mercury Music Prize in the UK) incorporated extensive use of heavily manipulated, mostly female, 'girl next door' vocal samples. Burial has spoken at length regarding his intent to reincorporate elements of musical precursors such as 2-step garage and house into his sound. Dubstep artists Chefal, Hijak and Hatcha were featured as the cover stars on the 'Summer of Dub' issue of the free British magazine RWD in July 2007.

Much like drum and bass before it, dubstep started to become incorporated into other media. In 2007, Benga, Skream, and other dubstep producers provided the soundtrack to much of the second series of Dubplate Drama, which aired on Channel 4 with a soundtrack CD later released on Rinse Recordings. A track by Skream also featured in the second series of the teen drama Skins, which also aired on Channel 4 in early 2008.

In the summer of 2008, Mary Anne Hobbs invited Cyrus, Starkey, Oneman, DJ Chef, Silkie, Quest, Joker, Nomad, Kulture and MC Sgt Pokes to the BBC's Maida Vale studios for a show called Generation Bass. The show was the evolution from her seminal BBC Radio 1 Dubstepwarz Show in 2006, and further documented another set of dubstep's producers.

Silkie and Quest, along with Kromestar and Heny G would all come through the Anti-Social Entertainment crew, with a show on Rinse FM and later Flex FM.

As the genre spread to become an international rather than UK-centric scene, it also saw a number of women making headway into the scene in a variety of ways. Alongside Soulja of Ammunition Promotions and Mary Anne Hobbs, an influx of female producers, writers, photographers and DJs all broke through in the up-to-then male-orientated scene. With key 12" releases on Hyperdub, Immigrant and Hotflush Recordings, producers Vaccine, Subeena and Ikonika introduced a palette of new sounds and influences to the genre, such as double-time bass drums, 8-bit video game samples, hand percussion and lushly arranged strings. Mary Anne Hobbs commented that, unlike "Grime and drum 'n' bass raves, the mood at dubstep nights is less aggressive, or more meditative, leading to a larger female attendance at events than with the genre's precursors. You see the female-to-male ratio constantly going up – it's got the potential to be 40:60".

==== 2008: Purple sound ====
Purple sound emerged in Bristol in late 2008 out of the splintering dubstep scene. The term was coined by British producers Joker, Gemmy, and Guido, who did not intend for it to become its own genre, but rather to describe their own music. It took inspiration from wonky, which it is sometimes considered a part of. It incorporates synth-funk from the 1980s and G-funk production from the 1990s into dubstep, while also introducing many aspects of grime and 8-bit music. Several prominent purple sound artists cite video game music as a large influence. Purple sound later led to the development of future bass.

=== 2009–2014: Mainstream popularity and Brostep ===
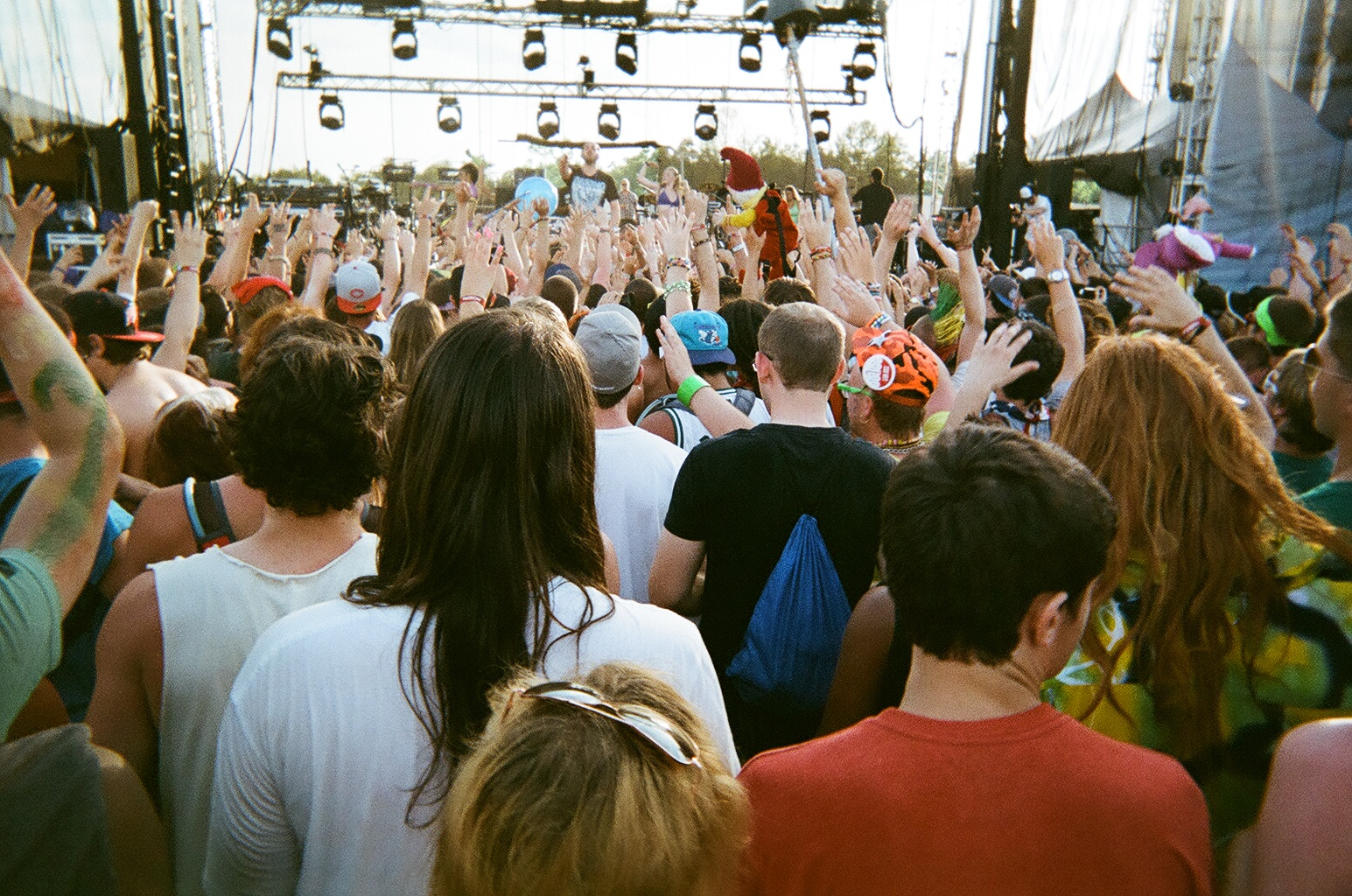
Borgore performing for crowds on 7 July 2011 at the 10th Anniversary Camp Bisco Music Festival in Mariaville Lake, New York

The influence of dubstep on more commercial or popular genres can be identified as far back as 2007, with artists such as Britney Spears using dubstep sounds; critics observed a dubstep influence in the song "Freakshow", from the 2007 album Blackout, which Tom Ewing described as "built around the 'wobbler' effect that's a genre standby." Benga and Coki's single "Night" still continued to be a popular track on the UK dance chart more than a year after its release in late 2007, still ranking in the top five at the start of April 2008 on Pete Tong's BBC Radio 1 dance chart list.

However, the year 2009 saw the dubstep sound gaining further worldwide recognition, often through the assimilation of elements of the sound into other genres, in a manner similar to drum and bass before it. At the start of the year, UK electronic duo La Roux put their single "In for the Kill" in the remix hands of Skream. They then gave remix duties of "I'm Not Your Toy" to Nero and then again with their single "Bulletproof" being remixed by Zinc. The same year, London producer Silkie released an influential album, City Limits Vol. 1, on the Deep Medi Musik label, using 1970s funk and soul reference points, a departure from the familiar strains of dub and UK garage. The sound also continued to interest the mainstream press with key articles in magazines like Interview, New York, and The Wire, which featured producer Kode9 on its May 2009 cover. XLR8R put Joker on the cover of its December 2009 issue.

In April 2009 Luke Hood founded the YouTube channel UKF Dubstep, which introduced Dubstep to a broader range of young people internationally. In November 2010 the channel had 100,000 subscribers, and as of November 2019 has over one million. "UKF features established and up and coming producers from around the world, featuring artists from Flux Pavilion / Knife Party to Friction / Hybrid Minds. We're sent a huge amount of music so it's our job to pick the best to upload on the channel for our audience to listen to. In just over 3 years our channels now have more than 2m subscribers and 4 channels – UKF Dubstep, Drum & Bass, Music and Mixes. The audience is getting more and more International and younger," Luke said on the interview with SoSoActive.

In a move foreshadowed by endorsements of the sound from R&B, hip-hop and recently, mainstream figures such as Rihanna, or The Bomb Squad's Hank Shocklee, Snoop Dogg collaborated with dubstep producers Chase & Status, providing a vocal for their "underground anthem", "Eastern Jam". The 2011 Britney Spears track "Hold It Against Me" was also responsible for promoting dubstep tropes within pop music, topping the US Billboard Hot 100 chart. Rihanna's Rated R album released such content the very year dubstep saw a spike, containing three dubstep tracks. Such events propelled the genre into the biggest radio markets overnight, with considerable airplay. Other hip-hop artists like Xzibit added their vocals to dubstep instrumental tracks for the mixtape project Mr Grustle & Tha Russian Dubstep LA Embrace The Renaissance Vol. 1 Mixed by Plastician. In summer 2009, rapper and actress Eve used Benga's "E Trips"; adding her own verses over the beat to create a new tune called "Me N My"; the first single from her unreleased album Flirt. The track was co-produced by Benga and hip hop producer Salaam Remi.

Throughout 2010, the presence of dubstep in the pop charts was notable, with "I Need Air" by Magnetic Man reaching number 10 in the UK singles chart. This presented a turning point in the popularity of mainstream dubstep amongst UK listeners as it was placed on rotation on BBC Radio 1. "Katy on a Mission" by Katy B (produced by Benga) followed, debuting at number 5 in the UK singles chart, and stayed in the top 10 for five more weeks. Also, in 2010, American producer Skrillex had achieved moderate commercial success in North America with a dubstep-influenced sound. By 2011, his EP Scary Monsters and Nice Sprites had peaked at number three on the U.S.Billboard Dance/Electronic Albums chart. In February 2011, Chase & Status's second album No More Idols reached No. 2 in the UK album chart. On 1 May 2011, Nero's third single "Guilt" from their album reached number 8 in the Official UK Singles Chart. DJ Fresh and Nero both had number one singles in 2011 with "Louder" and "Promises". Strong baselines imported from dubstep continued in popular music with the Taylor Swift song "I Knew You Were Trouble", which made number 1 on Billboard's U.S. Mainstream Top 40 chart.

==== 2011: Post-dubstep ====
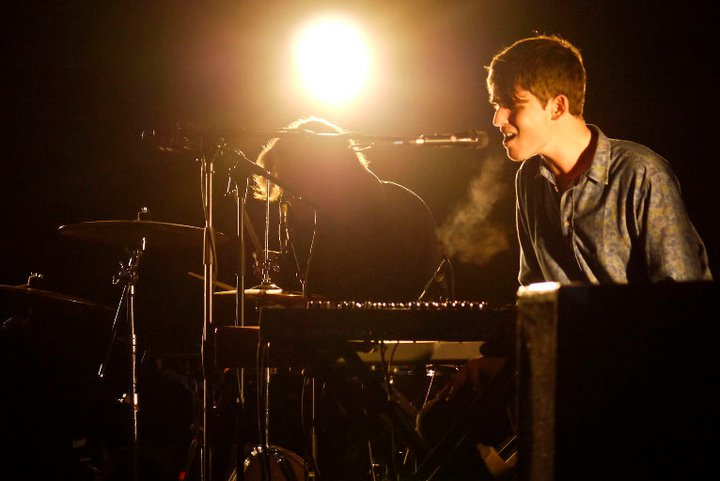
James Blake performing at Glastonbury Festival, June 2011

In early 2011, the term "post-dubstep" (sometimes known as "UK bass" or simply "bass music") was used to describe club music that was influenced by certain aspects of dubstep. Such music often references earlier dubstep productions as well as UK garage, 2-step and other forms of underground electronic dance music. Artists producing music described as post-dubstep have also incorporated elements of ambient music and early R&B. The latter in particular is heavily sampled by three artists described as post-dubstep: Mount Kimbie, Fantastic Mr Fox and James Blake. The tempo of music typically characterised as post-dubstep is approximately 130 beats per minute.

The breadth of styles that have come to be associated with the term post-dubstep preclude it from being a specific musical genre. Pitchfork writer Martin Clark has suggested that "well-meaning attempts to loosely define the ground we're covering here are somewhat futile and almost certainly flawed. This is not one genre. However, given the links, interaction, and free-flowing ideas ... you can't dismiss all these acts as unrelated" The production duo Mount Kimbie is often associated with the origination of the term post-dubstep. English music producer Jamie xx released remixes which are considered post-dubstep, including We're New Here (2011), a Gil Scott-Heron remix album.

==== 2011: Brostep and American developments ====
Brostep
- Stylistic origins: Dubstep; electro house; drumstep; heavy metal; electronic rock; industrial rock; Big beat; breakcore; drill 'n' bass; glitch hop; nu metal; electronicore
- Cultural origins: Late 2000s – early 2010s, United States (mostly), United Kingdom (originally)
- Derivative forms: Melodic Dubstep • Moombahcore • Hybrid Trap • Hard Trap • Glitch Hop (EDM)

Fusion genres
- Complextro; metalstep; colour bass; reggaestep

Brostep is a harder form of dubstep that emerged during the late 2000s and early 2010s and pioneered by artists like Skrillex and Rusko.

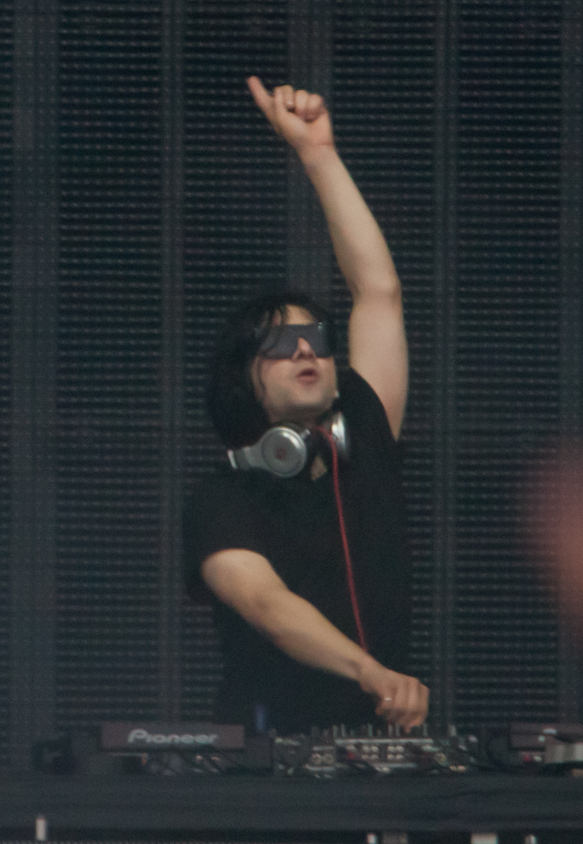
Skrillex performing in 2012

In 2011, dubstep gained significant traction in the US market, by way of a post-dubstep style known as brostep, with the American producer Skrillex becoming something of a "poster boy" for the scene. In September 2011, a Spin Magazine EDM special referred to brostep as a "lurching and aggressive" variant of dubstep that has proven commercially successful in the United States. Unlike traditional dubstep production styles, which emphasise sub-bass content, brostep accentuates the middle register and features "robotic fluctuations and metal-esque aggression". According to Simon Reynolds, as dubstep gained larger audiences and moved from smaller club-based venues to larger outdoor events, sub-sonic content was gradually replaced by distorted bass riffs that function roughly in the same register as the electric guitar in heavy metal.

The term brostep has been used by some as a pejorative descriptor for a style of popular dubstep developed in the United States. The producer known as Rusko himself claimed in an interview on BBC Radio 1Xtra that "brostep is sort of my fault, but now I've started to hate it in a way ... It's like someone screaming in your face ... you don't want that." According to a BBC review of his 2012 album Songs, the record was a muddled attempt by Rusko to realign his music with a "Jamaican inheritance" and distance it from the "belching, aggressive, resolutely macho" dubstep produced by his contemporaries.

Commenting on the success of American producers such as Skrillex, Skream stated: "I think it hurts a lot of people over here because it's a UK sound, but it's been someone with influences outside the original sound that has made it a lot bigger. The bad side of that is that a lot of people will just say 'dubstep equals Skrillex'. But in all honesty it genuinely doesn't bother me. I like the music he makes." Other North American artists that were initially associated with the brostep sound were Canadian producers Datsik and Excision. Their production style has been described by Mixmag as "a viciously harsh, yet brilliantly produced sound that appealed more to Marilyn Manson and Nine Inch Nails fans than it did to lovers of UK garage". The brostep sound also attracted the attention of metal bands. Nu metal band Korn's 2011 album The Path of Totality features several collaborations with electronic music producers, including Skrillex and Excision. This style of dubstep is sometimes known as metalstep.

==== 2012–2013: Riddim ====
In the early 2010s, UK artists began to play with a style of dubstep reminiscent of a resurgence or continuation of original British dubstep styles. This became known as Riddim, a name coined by British producer Jakes around 2012. The name comes from the Jamaican Patois term riddim, which refers to the instrumental of dub, reggae and dancehall music. Riddim is characterised by repetitive and minimalist sub-bass and triplet percussion arrangements, similar to original dubstep, with a sound described as "wonky". Riddim is looked upon as a subgenre of dubstep, similarly to other sub genres like brostep, drum-step, and wobble-step. It started gaining significant popularity around 2015. It is said that those who enjoy this style of music describe it as the "dirtier, swaggier" side of dubstep, whereas those looking at this from the outside, claim that it is "repetitive and chaotic". Notable artists of the genre include Subfiltronik, Bukez Finezt, P0gman, Badklaat, 50 Carrot, Dubloadz and Coffi. Notable tracks of the genre include "Yasuo" by Bommer and Crowell, "Orgalorg" by Infekt, and "Jotaro" by Phiso. Some commentators have suggested that Riddim is not a genre in its own right and is instead just a style of dubstep. Riddim producer Oolacile states "A lot of people who have been around a lot longer have a different idea of what riddim is. Older fans consider riddim to be the swampy, repetitive sound, and newer fans will associate riddim with the sound of the underground."

=== 2014–present: Decline in mainstream popularity ===
Beginning in mid-2014, dubstep began to decline drastically in mainstream popularity, particularly in the United States, where many formerly successful dubstep artists became popular. Artists such as Skrillex, for instance, moved on to producing tracks for trap and pop artists, while artists such as Mount Kimbie and James Blake shifted their sounds from post-dubstep into more experimental or soulful electronic influenced music. Pioneers of dubstep such as Skream and Loefah moved away from the genre, moving on to other genres instead. Loefah stopped playing and producing dubstep and moved on to UK bass, founding his record label Swamp81 in the process. Skream shifted away from dubstep, choosing to instead produce and play house and techno music in his DJ sets and releasing various techno songs on Alan Fitzpatrick's record label We Are The Brave.

==== 2016–present: Colour bass ====
Around the early to mid 2010s, a niche development of dubstep began to emerge which combines the aggression and impact of brostep with the rich tonality and musicality of melodic dubstep, fusing tonality with mid-range bass sound design. Artists like 501, Subscape, and Gemini have experimented upon this style of production in the earlier 2010s. English bass music producer Chime coined the term "colour bass" to describe this style of dubstep with its focus on vibrant, bright and colourful production and sound design, and founded the record label Rushdown in 2016 to promote it. Despite the overall declining popularity of dubstep in mainstream culture, colour bass was promoted by veteran electronic labels like Monstercat around the early 2020s, with artists like Skybreak, Ace Aura, and Chime herself finding success in producing colour bass music.

== See also ==
- List of dubstep musicians
