= Digital Mystikz =

English electronic music duo

- Digital Mystikz/DMZ logo

Background information
- Origin: Norwood, London, England
- Genres: Dubstep
- Labels: DMZ (Mala, Coki, Loefah and Sgt. Pokes' label); Deep Medi Musik (Mala's label); Don't Get It Twisted (Coki's label); AWD (Coki's label); Ital (Loefah's label); Swamp 81 (Loefah's label); 81 (Loefah's sub-label)
- Members: Mala; Coki
- Website: dmzuk.com

Digital Mystikz are a dubstep production duo consisting of Mala (born Mark Lawrence), and Coki (born Dean Harris, 26 August 1980) from the South London suburb of Norwood. Along with Loefah and SGT Pokes, who make up the group ASBO (All Soundbwoy Out), they operate the DMZ record label and host the influential bimonthly nightclub DMZ, held at the Mass club complex in Brixton, London. BBC Radio 1 DJ John Peel was an early supporter of Digital Mystikz, eventually putting them in his annual 2004 top 50 list at number 29. They are among the scene's most famous producers. Their song "Anti War Dub" appeared in the 2006 film Children of Men, although it wasn't included in the soundtrack. In the summer of 2008, Mala was chosen to headline the night portion of the Sónar Festival in Barcelona. In April 2011, Mala travelled to Cuba with Gilles Peterson who was returning to Havana to produce the second installment in the Havana Cultura series. While Peterson recorded new material with local musicians, Mala began work on a new album Mala in Cuba, which was released in September 2012.

== DMZ ==
DMZ has been described as one of dubstep's two "most influential regular clubnight[s]" (with its predecessor FWD>> the other one) and "central to the scene". Since starting in March 2005, the club's attendance has increased steadily. DMZ's first anniversary, when a queue of 600 people forced the club to move from its regular 400-capacity space to Mass' main room, has been cited as a pivotal moment in dubstep's history. BBC Radio 1 DJ Mary Anne Hobbs, whose support of dubstep has increased the music's popularity, discovered it at DMZ. Straight outta Croydon fliers carry the slogan "come meditate on bass weight". In 2005, an assortment of songs were created specifically to be played on the club's soundsystem.

== Discography ==
Release date	Label	Cat#	Artist(s)	Release name	Format
2004a	Big Apple Records	BAM 004	Digital Mystikz	Pathways / Ugly	12"
2004b	Rephlex	CAT 160 CD	Digital Mystikz, Loefah, Kode9	Grime 2	12" / CD
2004c	DMZ	DMZ 001	Digital Mystikz & Loefah	Twisup	12" / Web
2004d	DMZ	DMZ 002	Digital Mystikz & Loefah	Dubsession	12" / Web
2005a	DMZ	DMZ 003	Mala & Loefah	Da Wrath / Twisup (VIP Mixes)	12" / Web
2005b	DMZ	DMZ 004	Coki	Officer / Mood Dub	12" / Web
2005c	DMZ	DMZ 005	Digital Mystikz	Neverland / Stuck	12" / Web
2005d	DMZ	DMZ 006	Loefah	Root / The Goat Stare	12" / Web
2006a	DMZ	DMZ 007	Digital Mystikz	Haunted / Anti War Dub	12" / Web
2006b	DMZ	DMZ 008	Digital Mystikz	Ancient Memories	12" / Web
2006c	Soul Jazz Records	SJR 134-12	Digital Mystikz	Misty Winter / Conference	12" / Web
2006d	Soul Jazz Records	SJR 135-12	Digital Mystikz	Walkin' With Jah / Earth A Run Red	12" / Web
2006e	Tectonic	TEC008	Digital Mystikz & Loefah	System / Molten	12" / Web
2006f	DMZ	DMZ 009	Loefah	Mud / Ruffage	12" / CD
2006g	DMZ	DMZ 010	Mala	Left Leg Out / Blue Notez	12"
2006h	Tempa	TEMPA 024	Coki	Tortured / Shattered	12" / Web
2007a	DMZ	DMZ 011	Mala	Bury Da Bwoy / Hunter	12"
2007b	Deep Medi Musik	MEDI-03	Coki & Loefah	Disko Rekah / All Of A Sudden	12" / Web
2007c	Deep Medi Musik	MEDI-04	Mala	Changes / Forgive	12" / Web
2007d	DMZ	DMZ 012	Mala	Lean Forward / Learn	12"
2007e	Not on label	I&I001	Mala	Alicia	12"
2007f	Not on label	I&I002	Mala	In Luv	12"
2007g	Big Apple Records	BAM 009	Coki	Red Eye	12"
2007h	DMZ	DMZ 013	Coki	SpongeBob / The End	12"
2007i	Tempa	TEMPA 030	Coki & Benga	Night	12" / CD
2007j	Ringo Records	RNG004	Coki	Mad Head / Bass	12"
2008a	Disfigured Dubz	DIS002	Digital Mystikz / Silkie	Shake Out Your Demons / Cyber Dub	12"
2008b	Soul Jazz Records	SJR 161-12	Digital Mystikz & Kode9	Wait / Magnetic City	12" / CD
2008c	Sub Freq Recordings	FREQ001	Coki vs Chefal	Bloodthirst / Electro Bashment	12" / CD
2008d	Soul Jazz Records	SJR 172-12	Digital Mystikz & Kode9	Thief In The Night / Stung	12" / CD
2008e	DMZ	DMZ 014	Coki	Triple Six / Road Rage	12"
2008f	Deep Medi Musik	MEDI-10	Mala	Miracles / New Life Baby Paris	12" / Web
2009a	Dancing Demons	DDEMON001	Coki	Square Off / Warlord Riddim	12"
2009b	Ringo Records	RNG008	Johnny Clark VS Mala & Coki	Sinners / Goblin	12"
2009c	Hyperdub	HDBCD005	Mala & Cooly G	5 Years Of Hyperdub	CD / Web
2010a	DMZ	DMZLP001	Mala	Return II Space	12"
2010b	Soul Jazz Records	SJR 233-12	Four Tet vs Mala	Nothing To See / Don’t Let Me Go	12" / Web
2010c	DMZ	DMZ 021	Digital Mystikz	Education / Horrid Henry	12"
2010d	DMZ	DMZLP002	Coki	Urban Ethics	12" / CD / Web
2010e	Honest Jon's Records	HJP54	Moritz Von Oswald Trio & Digital Mystikz	Restructure 2	12" / Web
2011a	Tempa	TEMPA 055	Coki	Boomba	12" / Web
2011b	Sum Ting New	STN 002	Cotti ft Badness & Coki vs Cotti	Teen Wolf / Jugger-Nog	12" / Web
2011c	AWD	AWD001	Coki	Lucifer / Ruff Lovin'	12"
2011d	DMZ	DMZEP001	Coki	Don’t Get It Twisted	12" / Web
2011e	DMZ	DMZ 023	Mala	Eyez VIP	12"
2012a	DMZ	DMZ 022	Digital Mystikz	Marduk / Enter Dimensions	12"
2012b	AWD	AWD002	Coki	Duppy Soursop	12"
2012c	DMZ	DMZ 026	Coki	Haymaker / Revolution	12"
2012d	DMZ	DMZEP002	Coki	Don’t Get It Twisted Vol. 2	12" / Web
2012e	Brownswood Recordings	BWOOD090LP	Mala	Mala in Cuba	12" / CD / Web
2012f	Don't Get It Twisted	DGIT001	Coki	Bob's Pillow / Spooky	12" / Web
2012g	AWD	AWD003	Coki	Dry Cry (Soundboy)	12"
2012h	DMZ	DMZ 029	Mala	Stand Against War / Maintain Thru Madness	12"
2013a	Don't Get It Twisted	DGIT002	Coki & Blacks	Hold On Wait / Bedouins	12" / Web
2013b	Don't Get It Twisted	DGIT004	Coki	Voodoo Dolls / Prototype	12" / Web
2013c	DMZ	DMZ 030	Digital Mystikz	2 Much Chat / Coral Reef	12"
2014a	AWD	AWD004	Coki	Demonator / Indian Girl	12"
2014b	Deep Medi Musik	MEDi7001	Mala	I Wait, Pt. 2	7" / Web
2014c	Berceuse Heroique	BH 0.5	Loefah	Woman / Midnight	12"

– Releases are sorted by the earliest release date.
– Some of the early DMZ releases were later sent off digital stores.
– Japanese version of Urban Ethics album (P-Vine Records / PCD-93430) features 3 bonus tracks – "Mappa Riddim", "Sweety" and "Dark Force".
– Japanese version of Mala in Cuba album (Beat Records / BRC-348) features 15th bonus track "Rising".
