= Katy B discography =

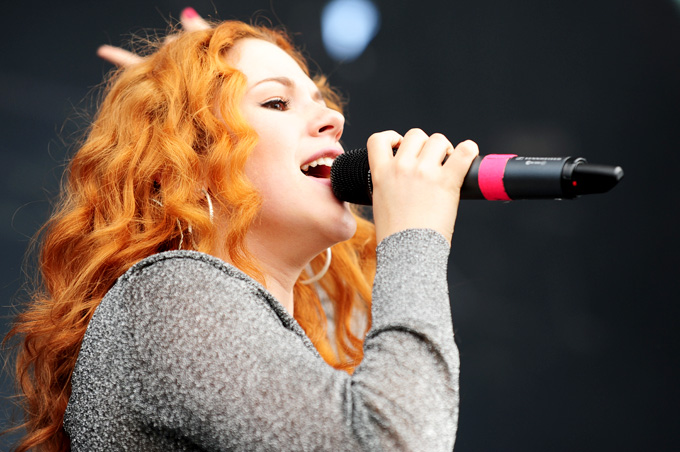
- Katy B performing in Australia in 2011
- Studio albums: 3
- Extended plays: 4
- Singles: 19
- Music videos: 17

The discography of British singer-songwriter Katy B consists of three studio albums, four extended plays, eighteen singles and seventeen music videos.

Her first single, "Katy on a Mission", was released on 22 August 2010. The single reached number five on the UK Singles Chart and number one on the UK Indie Chart. Katy B performed at the London Jazz Festival in 2009 with Ms Dynamite, who also featured on Katy's second single, "Lights On" which was released in the United Kingdom on 19 December 2010, and debuted at number four on the UK Singles Chart. Her third single "Broken Record" was released in March 2011, and peaked at number eight. The fourth single "Easy Please Me" was released on 3 June 2011. Her fifth single "Witches' Brew" was released on 28 August 2011. Katy's debut album On a Mission was released on 4 April 2011, and peaked at number two on the UK Albums Chart. In 2011, Katy B and Mark Ronson teamed up for the song "Anywhere in the World" created as an advert for the Coca-Cola and the 2012 Summer Olympics, which was released as a digital download on 13 May 2012.

She released "What Love Is Made Of" in May 2013. "5 AM" was released in November 2013 as the lead single from her second studio album, peaking to number 14 on the UK Singles Chart. "Crying for No Reason" was released in January 2014 as the second single from her second studio album, which peaked at number 5. In February 2014, Katy B released her second studio album Little Red, which debuted at number 1 on the UK Albums chart and went on to be certified Silver. In April 2014 she released the album's third single "Still".

Alongside KDA and Tinie Tempah, Katy B reached number 1 in 2015 with "Turn the Music Louder (Rumble)". It is included on her third album Honey, which was released on 22 April 2016. Three singles have been issued from the album, including the official lead single "Who Am I", featuring Craig David.

== Studio albums ==
Title	Album details	Peak chart positions							Certifications
Title	Album details	UK	UK Dance	AUS	BEL (FL)	IRE	SCO	US Dance	Certifications
On a Mission	Released: 1 April 2011; Label: Columbia; Formats: CD, digital download	2	1	—	10	66	4	16	BPI: Gold
Little Red	Released: 7 February 2014; Label: Columbia; Formats: CD, digital download, LP	1	—	100	22	35	1	—	BPI: Gold
Honey	Released: 22 April 2016; Label: Virgin EMI; Formats: CD, digital download, LP	22	—	—	132	—	55	—	

== Extended plays ==
Title	EP details
iTunes Festival: London 2011	Released: 18 July 2011; Label: Sony Music; Format: Digital download
Danger	Released: 7 December 2012; Label: Columbia; Format: Digital download
iTunes Festival: London 2013	Released: 26 September 2013; Label: Sony Music; Format: Digital download
Peace and Offerings	Released: 5 November 2021; Label: Rinse; Format: Digital download, streaming

== Singles ==
=== As lead artist ===
Year	Title	Peak chart positions					Certifications	Album
Year	Title	UK	BEL (FL)	IRE	NZ Hot	SCO	Certifications	Album
2010	"Katy on a Mission"	5	39	—	—	10	BPI: 2× Platinum; RMNZ: Gold	On a Mission
2010	"Lights On" (featuring Ms. Dynamite)	4	11	—	—	9	BPI: Platinum	On a Mission
2011	"Broken Record"	8	64	—	—	15		On a Mission
2011	"Easy Please Me"	25	16	—	—	40		On a Mission
2011	"Witches' Brew"	128	72	—	—	—		On a Mission
2013	"What Love Is Made Of"	21	52	—	—	33		Non-album single
2013	"5 AM"	14	53	—	—	21		Little Red
2014	"Crying for No Reason"	5	54	21	—	5	BPI: Gold	Little Red
2014	"Still"	116	—	—	—	—		Little Red
2015	"Turn the Music Louder (Rumble)" (with KDA and Tinie Tempah)	1	24	55	—	2	BPI: Platinum	Honey (Note: The version of "Turn the Music Louder (Rumble)" included on the album Honey does not contain Tinie Tempah's vocals and contains more verses sung by Katy B.)
2016	"Who Am I" (with Craig David and Major Lazer)	89	—	—	—	—		Honey
2016	"I Wanna Be" (with Chris Lorenzo)	60	—	—	—	—		Honey and Destroy the Image
2021	"Under My Skin"	—	—	—	—	—		Peace and Offerings
2021	"Lay Low"	—	—	—	—	—		Peace and Offerings
2023	"Paradise" (with Kings of the Rollers)	— (Note: "Paradise" did not enter the UK Singles Chart, but peaked at number 93 on the UK Singles Downloads Chart on 31 March 2023.)	—	—	30	—		Non-album single
2024	"Push the Tempo" (with Sub Focus)	54	—	—	12	—	BPI: Silver; RMNZ: Gold	Contact
2025	"Avalanche"	—	—	—	—	—		Non-album singles
2026	"Last Day of Summer" (with Jax Jones)	—	—	—	—	—		Non-album singles
"—" denotes single that did not chart or was not released.

=== Promotional singles ===
Year	Title	Album
2011	"Power on Me"	On a Mission
2015	"Calm Down" (with Four Tet and Floating Points)	Honey
2016	"Honey" (with Kaytranada)	Honey
2021	"Open Wound" (featuring Jaz Karis)	Peace and Offerings
2022	"Dancing Round the Truth" (Izco Remix)	Non-album single

=== As featured artist ===
Year	Title	Peak chart positions			Certifications	Album
Year	Title	UK	BEL	IRE	Certifications	Album
2008	"Tell Me" (DJ NG featuring Katy B & MC Versatile)	—	—	—		Non-album singles
2008	"Fade Away" (DJ Zinc & Makoto featuring Katy B)	—	—	—		Non-album singles
2010	"Perfect Stranger" (Magnetic Man featuring Katy B)	16	63	—		Magnetic Man
2010	"Crossover" (Magnetic Man featuring Katy B)	114	—	—		Magnetic Man
2012	"Anywhere in the World" (Mark Ronson featuring Katy B)	55	63	95		Non-album singles
2013	"Find Tomorrow (Ocarina)" (Dimitri Vegas & Like Mike featuring Wolfpack and Katy B)	—	2	—		Non-album singles
2015	"Save Me" (Keys N Krates featuring Katy B)	—	—	—		Midnite Mass
2016	"Freak Like Me" (Lee Walker & DJ Deeon featuring Katy B & MNEK)	80	—	—	BPI: Gold	Non-album single
"—" denotes single that did not chart or was not released.

== Other charted songs ==
Year	Title	Peak chart positions	Album
Year	Title	UK	Album
2010	"Louder"	145	"Katy on a Mission" (single)

== Guest appearances ==
Year	Title	Album	Artist
2010	"Hold Me"	Mega Mega Mega	The Count & Sinden
2012	"What You Came For"		Mosca
2013	"Sun Goes Down"	A Moving Picture	Devlin
2014	"Lover Like You"	Sirens	Gorgon City
2017	"Good Life"	Classic House	Pete Tong, Jules Buckley and Heritage Orchestra
2017	"Sound of Music"	Kooky Music EP	Jamie Jones
2018	"Call Your Bluff"	Tree	JD. Reid

== Music videos ==
Year	Title	Director	Artist(s)	References
2010	"Katy on a Mission"	Johny Mourgue	Katy B	
2010	"Louder"	Johny Mourgue	Katy B	
2010	"Perfect Stranger"	W.I.Z.	Magnetic Man featuring Katy B	
2010	"Lights On"	Johny Mourgue	Katy B featuring Ms. Dynamite	
2011	"Broken Record"	Jamie Thraves	Katy B	
2011	"Easy Please Me"	Ben Newman	Katy B	
2011	"Witches' Brew"	Colin Tilley	Katy B	
2011	"Movement"	DJ Zinc	Katy B	
2012	"Got Paid"		Katy B featuring Zinc & Wiley	
2012	"What You Came For"		Mosca featuring Katy B	
2013	"What Love Is Made Of"	Emil Nava	Katy B	
2013	"5 AM"	Ronan Pollock	Katy B	
2014	"Crying for No Reason"	Sophie Muller	Katy B	
2014	"Still"	Sophie Muller	Katy B	
2015	"Turn the Music Louder (Rumble)"	Carly Cussen	KDA featuring Tinie Tempah & Katy B	
2016	"Who Am I"	Jeremy Rall	Katy B, Craig David, Major Lazer	
2016	"I Wanna Be"		Katy B, Chris Lorenzo	
