= On a Mission Tour =

2011 concert tour by Katy B

On A Mission Tour
- Tour by Katy B
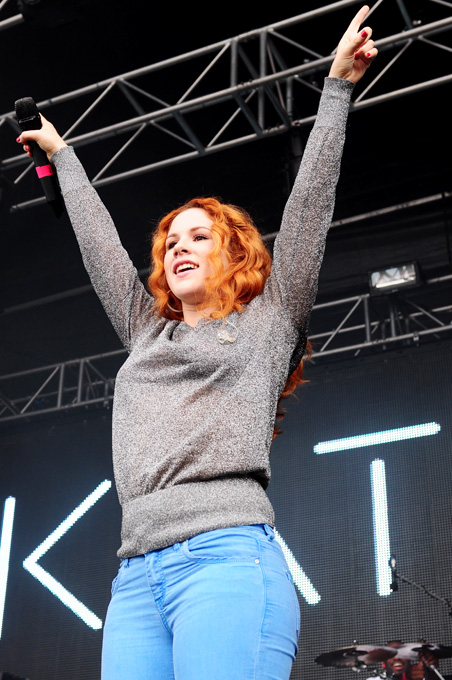
- Katy B
- Associated album: On a Mission
- Start date: 8 October 2011
- End date: 5 November 2011
- Legs: 1
- No. of shows: 18 Total

The On A Mission Tour was the debut concert tour by English recording artist Katy B, in support of her debut album On a Mission. The tour visited venues across the United Kingdom, before culminating with a date in Belgium.

== Reception ==
- David Griffins from 4Music gave the tour a positive review, saying, "With only one album's worth of material to draw from, she probably should have trimmed a couple of songs from the setlist, but overall her gig showed strong promise of things to come."
- Mark Worgan from The Upcoming gave the tour 3/5 stars, saying, "Katy B showed just why she has risen so far so fast, yet that she is by no means yet the finished article. Before closing she thanked everyone 'for coming with her on her mission'. She may not have fully accomplished it yet, but on the evidence of this set given time and a few more floor-fillers she will."

== Support acts ==
- Ms Dynamite
- P Money
- Jamie George
- Roska
- Zinc

== Setlist ==
1. Broken Record
2. Movement
3. Louder
4. Easy Please Me
5. Power on Me
6. Witches' Brew
7. Go Away
8. Disappear
9. Good Life / Show Me Love
10. Hard To Get
11. Why You Always Here
12. Perfect Stranger
13. Crossover

Encore:

1. Katy on a Mission
2. Lights On

== Tour dates ==
Date	City	Country	Venue
Europe
30 April 2011	Bristol	England	O2 Academy Bristol
8 October 2011	Ipswich	England	Regent Theatre
11 October 2011	Leeds	England	O2 Academy Leeds
12 October 2011	Manchester	England	O_{2} Apollo Manchester
13 October 2011	Newcastle upon Tyne	England	Newcastle Academy
14 October 2011	Glasgow	Scotland	O_{2} Academy Glasgow
16 October 2011	Liverpool	England	O_{2} Academy 1
17 October 2011	Sheffield	England	Sheffield Academy
18 October 2011	Nottingham	England	Rock City
20 October 2011	Birmingham	England	Birmingham Academy
21 October 2011	Cardiff	Wales	Great Hall
22 October 2011	Brighton	England	Brighton Centre
24 October 2011	London	England	Shepherd's Bush Empire
25 October 2011	London	England	Shepherd's Bush Empire
29 October 2011	Cambridge	England	Cambridge Corn Exchange
30 October 2011	Bournemouth	England	Solent Hall
31 October 2011	Brighton	England	Brighton Dome
2 November 2011	Plymouth	England	Plymouth Pavilions
5 November 2011	Brussels	Belgium	Palais 12
