= Honey (Katy B album) =

Studio album by Katy B
- Released: 22 April 2016
- Genres: Dance; house; R&B
- Length: 54:14
- Labels: Rinse; Virgin EMI
- Producers: Kaytranada; Geeneus; Jr Blender; Diplo; Wilkinson; JD. Reid; The HeavyTrackerz; Chris Lorenzo; Four Tet; Mr. Mitch; KDA; Jamie Jones; Kate Simko; MssingNo; Hannah Wants

Katy B chronology
Little Red (2014)	Honey (2016)	Peace and Offerings (2021)

Singles from Honey
- 1. "Who Am I" Released: 5 February 2016

Honey is the third studio album by English singer and songwriter Katy B. It was released on 22 April 2016 by Rinse and Virgin EMI. Is preceded by the singles "Turn the Music Louder (Rumble)" and "Who Am I".

== Background ==
Katy B released her second studio album, Little Red, on 7 February 2014. The album was supported with the release of lead single, "5 AM", which became Katy's fourth top 20 single on the UK Singles Chart. Katy also scored her third top 5 hit, "Crying for No Reason", which is certified silver for overall sales of 200,000 copies. During this time, Katy also embarked on the "Little Red Tour", which started on 25 March 2014 and included 14 dates across UK cities.

== Release and promotion ==
During an appearance on the Jingle Bell Ball, Katy confirmed the album's title to be Honey, stating later: "I'm a big fan of honey in general, I have jars and jars of it in my house. I'm fascinated by how beautiful it is, it's a real gift. The whole summer I was writing this album I was using all these amazing experiences. Then I knew I had to knuckle down, so I locked myself away in my hive and didn't go out, and the honey is my music."

Katy unveiled first song from the album, a collaboration with Four Tet and Floating Points, "Calm Down", on 11 December 2015. On 5 February 2016 a collaboration with Craig David and Major Lazer, "Who Am I" was released officially as the first official single from the album. Katy and David performed track for the first time on BBC Radio 1 Live Lounge, along with another promo track, "Honey".

As part of the iTunes pre-order, Katy allowed a download of two tracks, "I Wanna Be" and "Lose Your Head", for those who pre-ordered the album.

=== Singles ===
Katy and Tinie Tempah featured on a song recorded by British DJ KDA, "Turn the Music Louder (Rumble)". The song was released as a digital download on 16 October 2015 by Ministry of Sound. On 23 October 2015, the song debuted at number one on the UK Singles Chart, becoming Katy B's first number one single. It is certified Gold in United Kingdom for overall 400,000 copies sold. Katy's solo version is featured on Honey.

The lead single from the album, "Who Am I", was released 5 February 2016 along with radio premiere on BBC Radio 1 the same day. The single debuted at number eighty nine on the UK Singles Chart.

== Critical reception ==
Professional ratings
Aggregate scores
Source	Rating
Metacritic	63/100
Review scores
Source	Rating
The Guardian	3/5 stars
Mixmag	8/10
NME	3/5 stars
The Observer	3/5 stars
Pitchfork	7.0/10
Rolling Stone	3.5/5 stars
Spin	7/10

At Metacritic, Honey holds an average score of 63 out of 100 (indicating "generally favorable reviews") based on 19 reviews from mainstream music critics. Brittany Spanos of Rolling Stone commented that "Katy B has a way to go in separating herself from the influx of R&B singers who dabble in dub, but she’s beginning to pave a path worth following." Brad Nelson of Pitchfork gave the album seven points out of ten and commenting that "new album show her caught up in the flow of something so overwhelming she can't see the beginning or the end of it, time expanding and collapsing with her in its center." Rachel Aroesti of The Guardian gave the album three out of five stars and stated that Honey provides "great vocal melodies elevated by luscious production". Spin's Eve Barlow gave the album seven points out of ten, praising Brien vocals and stating that "her vocals dance around the beats as gloriously as ever". Ben Jolley of Mixmag felt that "Honey is an energetic and youthful love letter to Katy B’s clubbing roots." and awarded album eight points out of ten.

Kitty Empire of The Observer described the album as "a paean to clubbing", giving it three stars out of five and criticised that "some tunes are so uneventful you wonder why they bothered." Joe Madden of NME stated that album "suffers when its producers smooth out their rougher edges to accommodate Katy's chart-star status", giving it three stars out of five.

== Track listing ==
No.	Title	Writer(s)	Producer(s)	Length
1.	"Honey" (with Kaytranada)	Kathleen Brien; Kaytranada	Kaytranada	4:44
2.	"Who Am I" (with Major Lazer and Craig David)	Brien; Craig David; Phillip Meckseper; Thomas Pentz	Geeneus (voc.); Jr. Blender; Diplo	3:24
3.	"So Far Away" (with Wilkinson and Stamina MC)	Brien; Wilkinson; Geeneus	Geeneus (add.); Wilkinson	4:28
4.	"Chase Me" (with Sasha Keable and JD. Reid)	Brien; JD. Reid	JD. Reid	3:25
5.	"Lose Your Head" (with The HeavyTrackerz, J Hus and D Double E)	Brien; The HeavyTrackerz; D Double E; Teddy Sambas; J Hus	The HeavyTrackerz	3:32
6.	"I Wanna Be" (with Chris Lorenzo)	Brien; Kerli Kõiv; Chris Lorenzo; Geeneus	Chris Lorenzo; Geeneus (voc.)	5:00
7.	"Calm Down" (with Four Tet and Floating Points)	Brien; Four Tet	Four Tet	4:04
8.	"Heavy" (with Mr. Mitch)	Brien; Mr. Mitch	Mr. Mitch	3:56
9.	"Turn the Music Louder (Rumble)" (KDA featuring Katy B)	Brien; Kris Di Angelis	KDA; Geeneus (voc.)	3:35
10.	"Dark Delirium" (with Jamie Jones and Kate Simko)	Brien; Jamie Jones; Kate Simko; Valeria Kurbatova	Jones; Simko	4:17
11.	"Water Rising" (with MssingNo and Geeneus)	Brien; MssingNo; Geeneus	MssingNo; Geeneus	4:29
12.	"Dreamers" (with Hannah Wants)	Brien; Hannah Wants	Wants	4:40
13.	"Honey (Outro)" (with Novelist and Geeneus)	Brien; Novelist; Geeneus	Geeneus	4:15
Total length:				54:14

Honey – iTunes bonus track and deluxe version CD 2
No.	Title	Length
14.	"Honey (Continuous Mix)"	52:49

== Personnel ==
Credits adapted from Honey album liner notes.

- Katy B – vocals
- Geeneus – engineer, executive producer, producer
- Kaytranada – producer, mixing
- Diplo – producer
- Jr Blender – producer
- Craig David – vocals
- Wilkinson – producer
- Stamina MC – vocals
- JD. Reid – producer
- Sasha Keable – vocals
- Jarrad Hearman – engineer, mixing, mastering
- Stuart Hawkes – mastering
- The HeavyTrackerz – producer
- J Hus – vocals
- D Double E – vocals
- Chris Lorenzo – producer
- Kerli Kõiv – vocals
- Four Tet – producer, mixing
- Floating Points – strings, flute, mixing
- Mr. Mitch – producer
- KDA – producer
- Shadow Child – additional editing
- Jamie Jones – producer
- Kate Simko – producer, strings
- London Electronic Orchestra – harp, violins, cello, upright bass
- Mssing No – producer
- Hannah Wants – producer
- Novelist – vocals
- Lewsi Philip Allen – guitar
- Give Up Art – art direction, design

== Charts ==
Chart (2016)	Peak position
Belgian Albums (Ultratop Flanders)	132
Scottish Albums (Official Charts)	55
UK Albums (Official Charts)	22
UK Album Downloads (Official Charts)	13
