= What Love Is Made Of =

Single by Katy B
- Released: 8 July 2013
- Recorded: 2012
- Genre: Dance pop; house
- Length: 3:55
- Label: Rinse; Columbia
- Songwriters: Gordon Warren; Kathleen Anne Brien
- Producer: Geeneus

Katy B singles chronology
"Anywhere in the World" (2012)	"What Love Is Made Of" (2013)	"5 AM" (2013)

"What Love Is Made Of" is a song recorded by British recording artist Katy B. Written by Katy alongside Gordon Warren, who also produced it under the name Geeneus, the track was released as a standalone single via digital retailers on 8 July 2013 by Rinse and Columbia Records. It was composed after Katy had been listening to dance genres. The theme conveyed in the lyrics is love while musically, the song has been described as a "trance-y" and "rave-y" dance song with its production containing synthesizers and piano. Katy later decided to not include it in Little Red (2014).

Upon its release, "What Love Is Made Of" received generally favorable reviews from contemporary music journalists, who favored the composition and Katy's distinctive vocal performance. It peaked at number 21 on the UK Singles Chart, and entered three other charts, reaching the top 40. To promote the song, Katy performed it live at the BBC Radio 1Xtra Live special and at her headline set during the Wireless Festival. Emil Nava also filmed and directed a music video for the song which was deemed similar to film series The Fast and the Furious.

== Background and composition ==
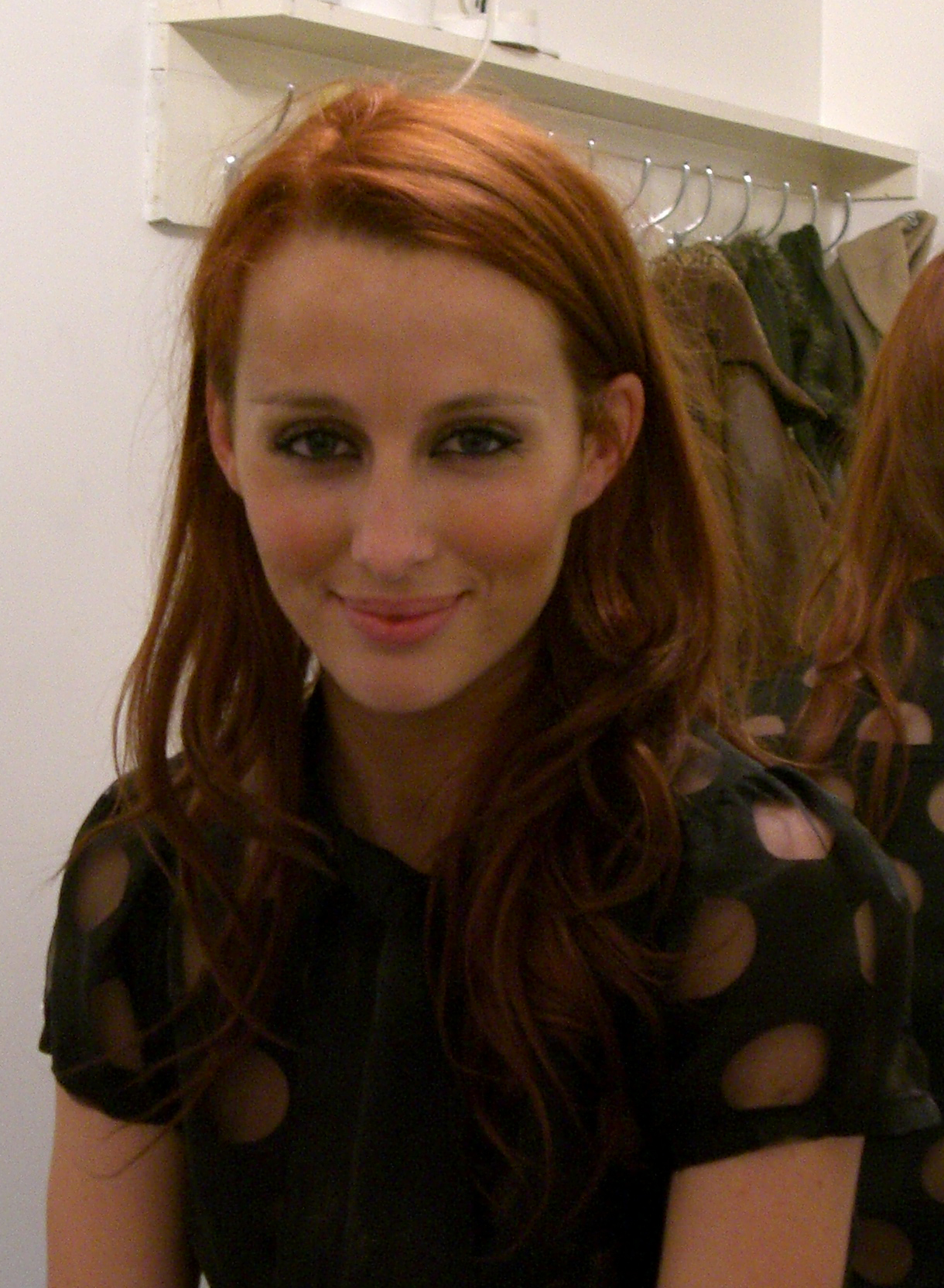
The song was compared to the works of Siobhán Donaghy (pictured).

In April 2011, Katy released her debut album, entitled On a Mission, by Rinse and Columbia Records. Exploring dubstep-based musical genres, it garnered critical praise, including being nominated for the Mercury Prize. In the UK, it was a commercial success, peaking at number 2 in the UK. Following that release, was the extended play (EP) Danger, which was available online in December 2012. During an interview with Billboard held in March 2013, Katy revealed that her sophomore studio album was nearly done. Katy revealed to MTV UK website District MTV that she felt inspired to record "What Love Is Made Of" by hearing dance music. She then got a bassline which made her "want to dance", and included it in the track. She also told the website that she wrote the song about the "feeling of love, what one person can give to you that someone else can't".

What Love Is Made Of" was premiered during Irish DJ Annie Mac's eponymous program on BBC Radio 1, on 10 May 2013, though its digital download only occurred on 5 July 2013. It was serviced as an extended play, where it was bundled with three remixes, by MK (Mark Kinchen), Felix da Housecat and Brackles. The song was ultimately excluded from Katy's second studio album, entitled Little Red. During an interview with Clash, Katy was asked about why she had not included the song in the album's track listing. To that question, she responded: "I just felt that I wanted to put some music out there, really. Like, 'Aaliyah' from Danger EP is on the album, but I loved collaborating with Jessie Ware. But ["What Love Is Made Of"] means a lot to me [too], so I wanted to get it out there, regardless of whether it was on the album." Having a length of three minutes and fifty-five seconds (3:55), "What Love Is Made Of" is an uptempo dance and house track that has been described as "rave-y" and "trance-y". Its instrumentation contains the sounds of pianos and synthesizers. Jordan Sargent of Spin observed that it continued the musical style first introduced in Katy's 2012 extended play (EP), Danger EP, which was "straight-forward house". Idolator's Sam Lansky compared her performance in the song to recording artist Siobhán Donaghy.

== Reception ==
Critical response to "What Love Is Made Of" was generally positive: most critics noted Katy's vocal performance and commended its sound. Siân Rowe from NME was extremely positive about "What Love Is Made Of", describing it as "darker than anything" from On a Mission, while calling it "slinky". The reviewer went on to commend the "irresistibly pouty" chorus. Pitchfork Media's Katherine St. Asaph commented that, in the song, the singer "sound[ed] completely enthralled, by either her lover or the music" and complimented her voice, noting that it seemed "ten times bigger than before". Jordan Sargent of Spin magazine called the track "exuberant" and highlighted Katy's vocal performance, which he deemed "typically fantastic", while the team from pop music website Popjustice gave "What Love Is Made Of" a rating of seven points out of ten.

Writing for Rolling Stone, Mike Powell gave the track three and a half stars out of five. The reviewer mused it was "effervescent", and said it was "durable music", though noted it followed a formula "as old as [Katy] is". A writer for the website Pretty Much Amazing classified the song's "hooks" as "catchy-as-hell" and the synthesizers as "bouncy", and concluded the review by naming the song "pop excellence". Digital Spy editor Lewis Corner opined that the song was "very good" and commented that "the Peckham star is back doing what she does best, albeit slightly more polished around the edges". He finally wrote that "the result is more than enough to keep our obsession rolling through yet another summer stretch". Sam Lansky from Idolator believed that the song had potential to become a "club hit" and named it the "biggest thing she’s recorded to date", while like other critics, highlighting Katy's vocals.

Commercially, "What Love Is Made Of" fared well on European charts. It stayed two weeks at the UK Singles Chart, where it peaked at number 21. On its component chart, the UK Dance chart, its peak was higher, at number six. In Belgium, on the Ultratip Flanders chart, it charted at the runner-up position, while on the Scotland singles chart, its peak was at number 33.

== Promotion ==
Directed by Emil Nava, the official music video for "What Love Is Made Of" was released on 29 May 2013. According to Michael Depland from MTV Buzzworthy, the visual takes inspiration from the American action film series The Fast and the Furious, as it delves into "the world of underground of street racing". A behind-the-scenes video for it was released on 14 June 2013.

The video begins with a closeup shot of Katy's face, surrounded by alternating red and blue lights, as she mouths the song's lyrics. It then changes to a mechanics' shop, where two young men are seen sitting, looking to the ground. Shots of sparks then appear in the screen, which emerge from a car. Katy is sitting on the automobile's passenger seat, while looking to her love interest, who is repairing the car, seemingly worried. She is later seen being driven by her boyfriend's group in that car. Her boyfriend is seen lying on a bed, and looking at the mirror, looking distantly. The car seen before finally arrives in a car parking lot where other cars are driving in circles. They exit their cars while others start driving again. The video's final scenes take place at the car parking lot, while the cars keep driving, with shots of women and other men sitting on the cars. The visual finally closes with a similar shot to that seen in the beginning, of Katy's face surrounded by lights, though now, her face is mixed with her love interest's.

Held on 7 October 2013, Katy attended the BBC Radio 1Xtra Live special, held at the Bournemouth International Centre, in which she performed "What Love Is Made Of". She also performed it during her headline set at the Yahoo! Wireless Festival 2013.

== Track listing ==
Digital download
No.	Title	Length
1.	"What Love Is Made Of"	3:55
2.	"What Love Is Made Of" (MK remix)	5:30
3.	"What Love Is Made Of" (Felix da Housecat remix)	4:05
4.	"What Love Is Made Of" (Brackles remix)	4:23

Promotional maxi single
No.	Title	Length
1.	"What Love Is Made Of" (Radio edit)	3:32
2.	"What Love Is Made Of"	3:54
3.	"What Love Is Made Of" (Brackles remix)	4:20
4.	"What Love Is Made Of" (Felix da Housecat remix)	4:04
5.	"What Love Is Made Of" (MK remix)	5:29

== Charts ==
=== Weekly charts ===
Chart (2013)	Peak position
Belgium (Ultratip Bubbling Under Flanders)	2
Scotland (OCC)	33
UK Dance (Official Charts Company)	6
UK Singles (OCC)	21

== Release history ==
Region	Date	Format	Label
United Kingdom	5 July 2013	Digital download	Rinse; Columbia
