= Who Am I (Katy B song) =

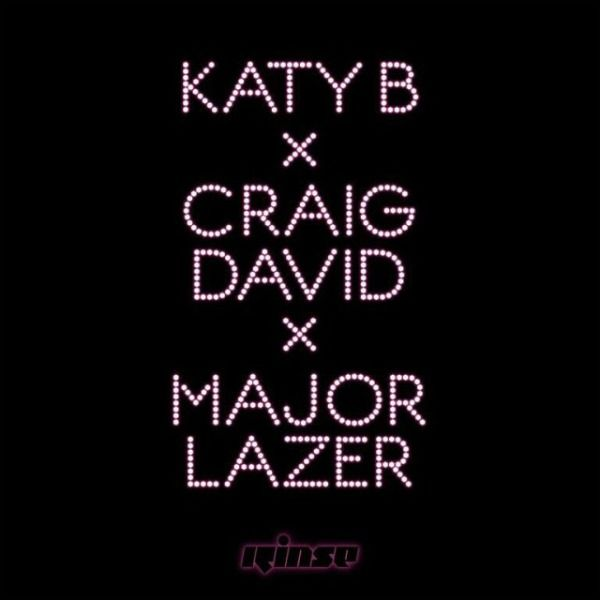

Single by Katy B, Craig David and Major Lazer

from the album Honey
- Released: 5 February 2016
- Recorded: 2015
- Genre: R&B
- Length: 3:21
- Label: Rinse; Virgin EMI
- Songwriters: Kathleen Brien; Craig David; Jr. Blender; Thomas Pentz
- Producers: Geeneus; Jr. Blender; Diplo

Katy B singles chronology
"Turn the Music Louder (Rumble)" (2015)	"Who Am I" (2016)

Major Lazer singles chronology
"Light It Up (Remix)" (2015)	"Who Am I" (2016)	"Boom" (2016)

Craig David singles chronology
"When the Bassline Drops" (2015)	"Who Am I" (2016)	"Nothing Like This" (2016)

Music video
- "Who Am I" on YouTube

"Who Am I" is a song recorded by English singer Katy B for her third studio album, Honey (2016). It is a collaboration with American electronic music band Major Lazer and English singer Craig David. The song was written by Brien, David, Phillip Meckseper, Thomas Pentz and produced by Geneeus, Jr. Blender and Diplo. It was released on 5 February 2016 as the lead single from the album.

The song received generally favourable reviews from music critics. On 12 February 2016, the single peaked at number 89 on the UK Singles Chart.

== Composition ==
"Who Am I" was written and produced by Katy herself, Craig David, Jr. Blender, Diplo and produced by Geneeus, Blender and Diplo. It's a midtempo R&B song, with smooth vocals delivered by Brien and David. Katy later admitted:

"[This song] was about my first boyfriend. I used to be in a band with him and when we broke up... I realized everyone I knew in London was in the band. I felt like I'd have to give up my band, my friends, my whole identity, start again from scratch. You don't just lose a person in a break-up. Others might lose their home, even their child and family, I think of people going through divorces when I sing it, too. It was originally a solo song, and I still don't really see it as me singing to Craig, we're the same person singing the same song."

== Critical reception ==
"Who Am I" received generally positive reviews from music critics and fans alike. Chantelle Fiddy of Mixmag gave the song 8 points out of 10, and commented: "Getting emotional with Craig David (who comes on here like Usher), this is a clever, Major Lazer-style take on the classic r’n’b duet". James Rettig of Stereogum described song as a "soulful jam" and Robin Murray of Clash described single as a "superstar clash" and praised Brien emotive vocals.

== Music video ==
The music video for the song was shot in early February 2016 in Miami. It premiered on 23 February 2016. The clip shows Katy B and David performing the track amongst Miami's nighttime lights.

== Live performances ==
Katy and David performed track live for the first time on BBC Radio 1 Live Lounge on 14 March 2016 and later have done multiple gigs.

== Charts ==
Chart (2016)	Peak position
UK Singles Downloads (OCC)	42
UK Singles (OCC)	89
