= Move to the Beat =

Coca-Cola promotional campaign for the 2012 Summer Olympics

Move to the Beat is the name of Coca-Cola's promotional campaign for the 2012 Summer Olympics in London. "Anywhere in the World", the song by Mark Ronson and Katy B is the "centerpiece" of the campaign.

== Campaign ==
Sponsored by Coca-Cola, Move to the Beat draws inspiration from the music of London and hopes to connect young people, predominantly teenagers, to the Olympic Games. The campaign was officially unveiled in September 2011. Five athletes, chosen for embodying "values of positivity and optimism that are at the heart of Coca-Cola and the Olympic movement", will act as ambassadors of the Move to the Beat campaign. Ambassadors include Mexican taekwondo athlete María Espinoza (aged 23), Singaporean archer Abdul Dayyan Jaffar (aged 17), British table tennis player Darius Knight (aged 21), American hurdler David Oliver (aged 29), and Russian sprinter Kseniya Vdovina (aged 24).

== See also ==
- List of Coca-Cola slogans
