= Peace and Offerings =

EP by Katy B
- Released: 5 November 2021
- Genre: R&B; neo soul
- Length: 28:53
- Label: Rinse
- Producer: Geeneus; Jake Edwards-Wood; Mike Brainchild; Monro; P2J; Stana/IVth

Katy B chronology
Honey (2016)	Peace and Offerings (2021)

Singles from Peace and Offerings
- 1. "Under My Skin" Released: 12 August 2021; 2. "Open Wound" Released: 1 October 2021; 3. "Lay Low" Released: 4 November 2021

Professional ratings
Review scores
Source	Rating
The Arts Desk	5/5 stars
DIY	4/5 stars
Pitchfork	7.0/10

Peace and Offerings is the fourth extended play by English singer and songwriter Katy B, released on 5 November 2021 through Rinse. It is her first release in five years, following 2016's Honey. The EP is a departure from Katy B's previous dance and house style, marking a move into neo soul and R&B territory. It was preceded by the singles "Under My Skin", "Open Wound" (featuring Jaz Karis) and "Lay Low".

== Background ==
Katy B said in a statement, "I think I consciously leaned into my R&B side more on this project. With the clubs being closed, it reflects what I'd be listening to and vibing to at home." She explained the title as "'Peace' is me taking myself away and having peace of mind and the 'Offerings' are the songs, the parts of myself I'm giving away. In a way I'm reintroducing myself again: I am the offering."

The EP was originally scheduled for release on 29 October 2021 before being delayed by a week.

== Critical reception ==
Joe Muggs of The Arts Desk commented that the EP is "downbeat in sound. There's none of the house beats that Katy is most associated with, but rather laid back dancehall, hip hop, Afrobeats, neo soul and above all the golden age R&B of the late 90s and early 00s that she grew up on". He acknowledged that there is still "plenty of groove here, and she's signalled there'll be other, less introspective, material to come. But all together it catches a mood."

Writing for DIY, Chris Taylor called Peace and Offerings "the morning after debrief" from Katy B's previous bass-heavy material. Awarding the album four out of five stars, Taylor felt that the EP shows "a more intimate side of Katy B", concluding it is a "nuanced, striking and incredibly welcome return from one of Britain's finest vocalists".

== Track listing ==
Peace and Offerings track listing
No.	Title	Writer(s)	Producer(s)	Length
1.	"Under My Skin"	Kathleen Brien; Ross Monro James; Richard Isong	Monro; P2J	3:18
2.	"Open Wound" (featuring Jaz Karis)	Brien; Jaz Karis; Alex MontaQue; Gordon Warren; Nathaniel Adamson	Geeneus	4:08
3.	"Dancing Round the Truth"	Brien; David Staniforth	Stana/IVth	3:10
4.	"Lay Low"	Brien; James Robinson; Michael Engmann	Mike Brainchild	3:11
5.	"Aftermath"	Brien; Staniforth; Jake Edwards-Wood	Stana/IVth	2:34
6.	"Floating"	Brien; Staniforth	Stana/IVth	3:58
7.	"In Your Room"	Brien; Edwards-Wood	Jake Edwards-Wood	3:45
8.	"Daydreaming on a Tuesday"	Brien; MontaQue; Warren; Adamson	Geeneus	4:49
Total length:				28:53
