= Valeria Clarke =

Harpist (born 1992)

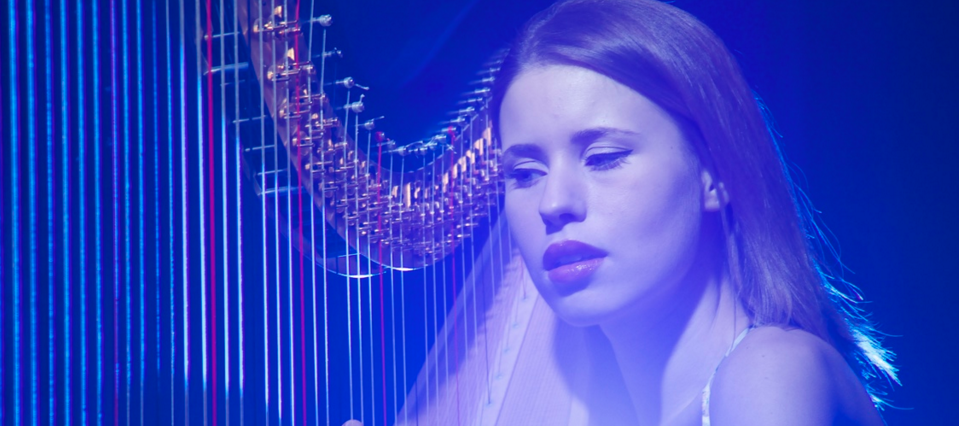

Background information
- Birth name: Valeria Kurbatova
- Born: 1992 (age 32–33); Moscow, Russia
- Instrument: Harp
- Website: valeriaclarke.com

Valeria Clarke (née Kurbatova; Russian: Валерия Курбатова; born 1992) is a harpist, who lives and performs in London. Clarke is a member of the Globe Ensemble, a harp, flute and viola trio, and is also a session musician in pop and dance music.

== Education ==
Clarke's musical study began at the age of 8, when she was awarded a scholarship to study at the Gnessin State Musical College in Moscow.

Clarke is a graduate of the Royal College of Music in London where she studied under Professor Ieuan Jones and received a scholarship from ABRSM.

== Career ==
Clarke is a founding member and principal harpist of the London Electronic Orchestra, started by Chicago house music producer and DJ Kate Simko. London Electronic Orchestra opened the iTunes Festival at the Roundhouse in London in 2013 and has recently released their debut album on The Vinyl Factory with contributions from house music impresario Jamie Jones. Clarke and Simko also featured alongside a host of pop artists on with Katy B’s 2016 album Honey. In February 2016, Clarke became a resident at entrepreneur Alan Yau's flagship centre for music in London, Park Chinois.
