= 5 AM (Katy B song) =

Single by Katy B

from the album Little Red
- Released: 4 November 2013
- Recorded: 2013
- Genre: Dance-pop; house
- Length: 3:22
- Label: Rinse; Ammunition; Sony
- Songwriters: Kathleen Anne Brien; Gordon Warren
- Producer: Geeneus

Katy B singles chronology
"What Love Is Made Of" (2013)	"5 AM" (2013)	"Find Tomorrow (Ocarina)" (2013)

"5 AM" is a song by English singer Katy B. It was released on 4 November 2013 as the lead single from her second studio album Little Red (2014). The track was produced by Geeneus. The song reached number fourteen in the UK Singles Chart. On 10 November 2013, Katy appeared on The Xtra Factor to perform the song.

== Music video ==
The official video for "5 AM" premiered on 30 September 2013, at a total length of three minutes and twenty-one seconds.

== Critical reception ==
Robert Copsey of Digital Spy gave the song a mixed review, stating the following:

"Judging by the music video that accompanies Katy B's new single, fame seems to be treating her rather well. Here, the sticky dancefloors and gritty urban haunts of her 'Lights On' and 'Easy Please Me' days have been replaced with a masquerade ball in a fancy country retreat. But despite embracing the perks that fame can bring, her problems are no less relatable. "It's 5am, all on my own/ I've lost my friends, I check my phone," she sings over spacey synths and laid-back house beats, proving she's still game for a knees-up. "I need somebody to calm me down/ A little lovin' like Valium," she then coolly confesses on a chorus that glides with the ease of a professional party-goer whose well in her comfort zone. The result is an effortless and slinky dancefloor thumper, but like most all-nighters, you'll struggle to recall it the following morning."

The writers of Rolling Stone placed the song at number thirty-two on their list of "50 Best Singles of 2013".

== Track listing ==
Digital download
No.	Title	Length
1.	"5 AM"	3:22
2.	"I Like You"	4:06
3.	"5 AM" (acapella)	3:43
4.	"5 AM" (Route 94 Remix)	5:15
5.	"5 AM" (Leftwing & Kody Remix)	6:41

Promo CD
No.	Title	Length
1.	"5 AM (Radio Edit)"	3:22
2.	"5 AM (Original)"	3:57
3.	"5 AM (Instrumental)"	3:56

== Chart performance ==
=== Weekly charts ===
Chart (2013)	Peak position
Scotland Singles (OCC)	21
UK Singles (OCC)	14

== Release history ==
Country	Release date	Format
Worldwide	28 October 2013	Digital download
