= Anywhere in the World =

Single by Mark Ronson and Katy B
- Released: 30 March 2012
- Recorded: 2011
- Length: 3:53
- Label: The Coca-Cola Company
- Songwriters: Mark Ronson; Katy B; Gordon Warren
- Producer: Mark Ronson

Mark Ronson singles chronology
"Somebody to Love Me" (2010)	"Anywhere in the World" (2012)	"Uptown Funk" (2014)

Katy B singles chronology
"Witches' Brew" (2011)	"Anywhere in the World" (2012)	"What Love is Made Of" (2013)

"Anywhere in the World" is a collaborative single by English DJ, guitarist, music producer, artist Mark Ronson and English singer-songwriter Katy B. It was recorded as part of Coca-Cola's Move to the Beat promotional campaign for the 2012 Summer Olympics in London. The single was released as a digital download on 30 March 2012 in Belgium and it was released in the UK on 13 May 2012.

== Background ==
Ronson used recorded snippets of the athletes—Mexican Taekwondo athlete Maria del Rosario Espinoza muffled punches, Russian runner Kseniya Olegovna Vdovina's heartbeat—in his anthemic instrumental.

== Cover versions ==
There is also a Bulgarian version of the single, called "Навсякъде по света" (lit. 'Everywhere in the World'). It features Raffi Bohosyan, Angel & Moisey and Krisko. A Spanish version called "Únete al movimiento" was recorded by Mexican group Belanova. For Switzerland a version featuring Geneva rapper M.A.M. replacing Katy's verses was recorded.

== Track listing ==
Digital download

1. "Anywhere in the World" (radio edit) – 3:53

UK digital EP

1. "Anywhere in the World" (radio edit) – 3:53
2. "Anywhere in the World" (sport-a-pella version) – 3:51
3. "Making of Anywhere in the World" – 2:36

== Chart performance ==
Chart (2012)	Peak position
Austria (Ö3 Austria Top 40)	68
Belgium (Ultratip Bubbling Under Flanders)	13
Belgium (Ultratip Bubbling Under Wallonia)	13
France (SNEP)	110
Ireland (IRMA)	95
Netherlands (Single Top 100)	84
Switzerland (Schweizer Hitparade)	40
UK Singles (OCC)	55

== Release history ==
Region	Date	Format
Belgium	30 March 2012	Digital download
United Kingdom	13 May 2012	Digital download
