= Witches' Brew (song) =

Single by Katy B

from the album On a Mission
- B-side: "See Through"
- Released: 28 August 2011
- Recorded: 2010
- Genre: Electro
- Length: 3:20
- Label: Columbia; Rinse
- Songwriters: Katy B; Zinc; Sam Frank
- Producer: Zinc

Katy B singles chronology
| "Easy Please Me" (2011) | "Witches' Brew" (2011) | "Anywhere in the World" (2012) |

"Witches' Brew" is a song recorded by British dance recording artist Katy B, for her 2011 debut studio album On a Mission. Written by the singer, Geeneus and Sam Frank, along with the song's producer, DJ Zinc, the song is styled in the genre of electro music, while infusing breakbeat. Its production centers on the usage of synthesizers; the lyrics revolve around luring in a lover using spells and potions. It was released by Rinse and Columbia Records as the album's fifth and final single, on 28 August 2011.

Upon its release, "Witches' Brew" generated mostly positive reviews from contemporary music journalists, who favored the melodic use of synthesizer arrangements. Commercially, it only entered two European charts, being that it reached number 128 on the UK Singles Chart. In doing so, it became the lowest peaking song from its parent album. In Flanders, its peak was higher, at number 22 on the Ultratip chart (a chart containing songs that have not yet reached the Top 50), equivalent to a peak of 72. The accompanying music video, directed by Colin Tilley, depicts Katy surrounded by winds, while in a room alongside a tied-up man.

== Background and release ==
"Witches' Brew" was released to iTunes Stores worldwide on 26 August 2011, featuring a new version of the song subtitled the "2nd Incantation". It was additionally packaged with a B-side, "See Through". American DJ Diplo released a self-produced remix to his SoundCloud account on 28 February 2012. It has since been described as taking on a dubstep-influenced sound, featuring 808 drums and a "sludgy, looping bassline" seemingly inspired by musician Redlight's "MDMA". Jenn Pelly from Pitchfork Media commented: "It's an aggressive take that rips slow, propulsive beats through the otherwise melodic dance track, evolving it into something noticeably more physical."

== Recording and composition ==
"Witches' Brew" was recorded at Rinse and Zinc's Studio; mixed at the latter location and mastered by Stuart Hawkes at Metropolis Studios, in London. Having a length of three minutes and twenty seconds (3:20), "Witches' Brew" is styled in the musical genre of electro, incorporating diverse elements of breakbeat in its composition. Its instrumentation makes use of contrasting synthesizers, breakbeats and bass, as the song prominently utilizes the first instrument. Jon O'Brien from AllMusic considered Katy's vocal performance to be of a neo soul nature. Written by sly seduction, it references spellcasting and wizardry in order to lure her love interest.

== Critical reception ==
Alex Denney of music publication NME deemed its beat "strident" and compared its synthesizer arrangement to sounds from a pinball machine, though he had a slightly more polarized reaction to the song's "hackeneyed arena-rave"-based chorus. Jon O'Brien from AllMusic classified the track as an "intoxicating fusion" and described the synthesizers as being "kaleidoscopic". Along with album song "Why You Always Here", Rick Pearson of Evening Standard called the song "thrilling, original and utterly of the moment". Gavin Martin of the Daily Mirror believed in the song's potential to be received as positively as the first two singles from its parent album, due to its "creamy melody and soulful come on".

Writing for The Guardian, Alexis Petridis mused that the song had "arrived at their own sui generis point", and thought it was organic instead of "forced". Marianna Halavage of The Herald thought the track was the "most exciting" out of the album's track listing, and, much like other critics, she favored the synthesizers which she deemed "manic".

- Noel Gardner of Drowned in Sound: Zinc’s ‘Witches’ Brew’, immediately following, is a more sinewy animal, reasonably for a man who came up through jungle and calls his DJ style ‘crack house’.
- Marianna Halavage of The Herald: Witches’ Brew is probably the most exciting track, with its manic synth waves leading into eardrum-vibrating broken beats.
- Alex MacPherson of FACT: And perhaps the best beat here is ‘Witches’ Brew’, with its hypnotic waves of synths giving way to an astonishingly effective broken beat breakdown.
- Joe Rivers of No Ripcord: The marvellously-titled Witches Brew throws oscillating bleeps around with some huge bass.
- Genevieve Koski of The A.V. Club: But as fun as Katy B is when she’s being flirty and seductive on tracks like “Katy On A Mission,” “Witches Brew,” and “Lights On,” she’s even more intriguing when she showcases her vulnerability on the down-tempo numbers “Go Away” and “Disappear.”
- The Music Fix: Elsewhere, the tinny synths of 'Witches Brew' make it sound like it’s been recorded inside malfunctioning pinball machine (in a good way, I hasten to add)
- Jim Carroll of The Irish Times: The fizzy title track, the brilliant Lights On (which sees the return of Ms Dynamite), Witches Brew and Broken Record catch a singer who is more than happy to waltz from one richly infectious, deeply melodic, urban pop touchstone to the next. Download tracks : On a Mission, Lights On, Witches Brew
- Maria Schurr of PopMatters: “Witches Brew” has keyboard blips galore and Katy’s voice sounds a little too digitized on the verses. It feels vaguely out of place, but a Minogue evocation is more than a welcome one. For the most part, such showiness is subtle.
- Scotsman.com: Brien plays Britney and Kylie more shrewdly at their own game on the heady Witches Brew, displaying much greater vocal artistry into the bargain.

== Music video ==
The music video was directed Colin Tilley and was released on 3 August 2011, and features scenes with Katy singing towards the camera in a white room, a close up on her face with flashing lights in the background, her in an office with a tied up man and papers flying around the room, and her dancing in a dark graveyard with the rain falling.

== Track listing ==
Digital download
| No. | Title | Length |
|---|---|---|
| 1. | "Witches' Brew" (2nd Incantation) | 5:12 |
| 2. | "See Through" | 4:00 |

Promotional CD single
| No. | Title | Length |
|---|---|---|
| 1. | "Witches' Brew" | 3:20 |

== Chart performance ==
| Chart (2011) | Peak position |
|---|---|
| Belgium (Ultratip Bubbling Under Flanders) | 22 |
| UK Singles (The Official Charts Company) | 128 |

== Release history ==
| Country | Date | Format |
|---|---|---|
| United Kingdom | 28 August 2011 | Digital download |
