= Turn the Music Louder (Rumble) =

2015 single by KDA

Single by KDA featuring Tinie Tempah and Katy B

from the album Honey
- Released: 16 October 2015
- Recorded: 2015
- Length: 3:21
- Label: Ministry of Sound
- Songwriter(s): Tinie Tempah; Katy B
- Producer(s): KDA

KDA singles chronology
"Rumble" (2015)	"Turn the Music Louder (Rumble)" (2015)	"Just Say" (2016)

Tinie Tempah singles chronology
"Not Letting Go" (2015)	"Turn the Music Louder (Rumble)" (2015)	"Girls Like" (2016)

Katy B singles chronology
"Save Me" (2015)	"Turn the Music Louder (Rumble)" (2015)	"Who Am I" (2016)

"Turn the Music Louder (Rumble)" is a song recorded by British DJ KDA. It is a re-working of his instrumental hit "Rumble" and it features vocals from rapper Tinie Tempah and singer Katy B. The song was released as a digital download on 16 October 2015 by Ministry of Sound. The song was written by Tempah and Katy B and produced by KDA. On 23 October 2015, the song debuted at number one on the UK Singles Chart, becoming Tempah's seventh single to do so and KDA and Katy B's first. The song appeared on Katy B's third studio album Honey (2016), in a version without Tinie Tempah's vocals.

== Release ==
The song premiered on 2 September 2015, and was released for digital download as a single on iTunes on 16 October 2015. A digital EP, which includes the song's extended mix, instrumental and two remixes by Armand Van Helden, was also released on 16 October 2015.

== Music video ==
A music video to accompany the release of "Turn the Music Louder (Rumble)" was first released onto YouTube on 7 October 2015 at a total length of three minutes and twenty-five seconds.

== In popular culture ==
The song was featured on the soundtrack of the 2016 video game Forza Horizon 3.

== Track listing ==
- Digital download – single
1. "Turn the Music Louder (Rumble)" (featuring Tinie Tempah and Katy B) (Radio Edit) – 3:21
- Digital download – EP
1. "Turn the Music Louder (Rumble)" (featuring Tinie Tempah and Katy B) (Extended Mix) – 6:18
2. "Turn the Music Louder (Rumble)" (featuring Tinie Tempah and Katy B) (Armand Van Helden Tribal Tattoo Mix) – 6:19
3. "Turn the Music Louder (Rumble)" (featuring Tinie Tempah and Katy B) (Armand Van Helden Do Voodoo Mix) – 5:12
4. "Turn the Music Louder (Rumble)" (featuring Tinie Tempah and Katy B) (Instrumental) – 6:18

== Charts and certifications ==
=== Charts ===
Chart (2015)	Peak position
Belgium (Ultratip Bubbling Under Flanders)	24
Ireland (IRMA)	55
Scotland (OCC)	2
UK Dance (OCC)	1
UK Indie (OCC)	1
UK Singles (OCC)	1

=== Certifications ===
Region	Certification	Certified units/sales
United Kingdom (BPI)	Platinum	600,000^{‡}
^{‡} Sales+streaming figures based on certification alone.

== Release history ==
Region	Date	Format	Label
United Kingdom	16 October 2015	Digital download	Ministry of Sound
