= Mr. Mitch =

- Born: Miles Ian Mitchell; London, England
- Genres: Grime, ambient, R&B, pop
- Occupation: Record producer
- Years active: 2010–present
- Labels: Planet Mu; Gobstopper Records

Miles Ian Mitchell, better known as Mr. Mitch, is a British grime record producer from London. He was a founding member of Boxed, a club night and label formed in 2012 with Oil Gang, Logos and Slackk.

He has released music on numerous labels including Planet Mu and his own Gobstopper Records imprint.

Mr. Mitch's sound in recent years has moved away from a Grime-focus towards a more pop-oriented feel.

== Discography ==
=== Studio albums ===
List of studio albums, with chart positions
Title	Album details	Peak chart positions		
Title	Album details	UK	UK R&B	UK Ind.
Parallel Memories	Released: 1 December 2014; Label: Planet Mu; Formats: CD, digital download	—	—	—
Devout	Released: 21 April 2017; Label: Planet Mu; Formats: CD, digital download	—	—	—
Lazy	Released: 5 March 2021; Label: Gobstopper; Formats: CD, digital download	—	—	—
"—" denotes a recording that did not chart or was not released in that territory.

=== Extended plays ===
Title	Details
Mr. Mitch - EP	Released: 2010; Label: Subdepth Records; Formats: Digital download
Fright Night EP	Released: 2010; Label: Gobstopper Records; Formats: Digital download
Mind Machines EP	Released: 2012; Label: Slit Jockey Records; Formats: Digital download
Suave EP	Released: 2013; Label: Run Music; Formats: Digital download
Primary Progressive EP	Released: 26 October 2018; Label: Gobstopper Records; Formats: Digital download

== Personal life ==
Mitchell is the grandson of Jamaicans who emigrated to the UK.
