= Lights On (Katy B song) =

Single by Katy B featuring Ms. Dynamite

from the album On a Mission
- B-side: "Lights On (Skream remix)"
- Released: 10 December 2010
- Recorded: 2010
- Genre: UK funky
- Length: 3:25
- Label: Columbia
- Songwriters: Katie Brien; Niomi McLean-Daley
- Producer: Geeneus

Katy B singles chronology
"Perfect Stranger" (2010)	"Lights On" (2010)	"Broken Record" (2011)

Ms. Dynamite singles chronology
"What You Talking About!?" (2010)	"Lights On" (2010)	"Neva Soft" (2011)

"Lights On" is a song performed by British singer Katy B and serves as the second single from her debut album, On a Mission. It features UK-based R&B singer and rapper Ms. Dynamite and was produced by Rinse FM founder Geeneus. It was released in the United Kingdom on 10 December 2010 as a digital download. It peaked at number 4 on the UK Singles Chart on 26 December 2010.

== Chart performance ==
Having initially been predicted to debut at number 2 behind The X Factor winner Matt Cardle's "When We Collide", "Lights On" debuted on the UK Singles Chart at number 4 on 26 December 2010. The single served as the highest new entry that week but was beaten by Cardle, Black Eyed Peas and Rihanna with "When We Collide", "The Time (Dirty Bit)" and "What's My Name?" respectively. After falling 7 places to number 11 on its second week in the chart, the single rebounded to its peak of number 4 on 9 January 2011, where it remained for two consecutive weeks.

"Lights On" also debuted on the Scottish Singles Chart on 26 December at number 11, again serving as the highest new entry for the week ending 1 January 2011. The song later went on to reach a new peak of number 9.

== Track listing ==
Digital download
No.	Title	Length
1.	"Lights On" (single mix)	3:25
2.	"Lights On" (Skream remix)	4:03

7" vinyl
No.	Title	Length
1.	"Lights On" (Skream remix) (Katy B featuring Ms Dynamite)	4:04
2.	"Lights On" (original) (Katy B featuring Ms Dynamite)	3:27
3.	"Lights On" (Girl Unit remix) (Katy B featuring Ms Dynamite))

== Charts ==
=== Weekly charts ===
Chart (2011)	Peak position
Belgium (Ultratop 50 Flanders)	11
Belgium (Ultratip Bubbling Under Wallonia)	25
Scottish Singles Sales (Official Charts)	9
UK Singles (Official Charts)	4

=== Year-end charts ===
Chart (2010)	Position
UK Singles (Official Charts Company)	185

Chart (2011)	position
Belgium (Ultratop Flanders)	80
UK Singles (Official Charts Company)	92

== Release history ==
Country	Date	Format
United Kingdom	10 December 2010	Digital download
United Kingdom	20 December 2010	12" vinyl

== Certifications and sales ==
Region	Certification	Certified units/sales
United Kingdom (BPI)	Platinum	600,000^{‡}
^{‡} Sales+streaming figures based on certification alone.
