= Keys N Krates =

Canadian electronic music band

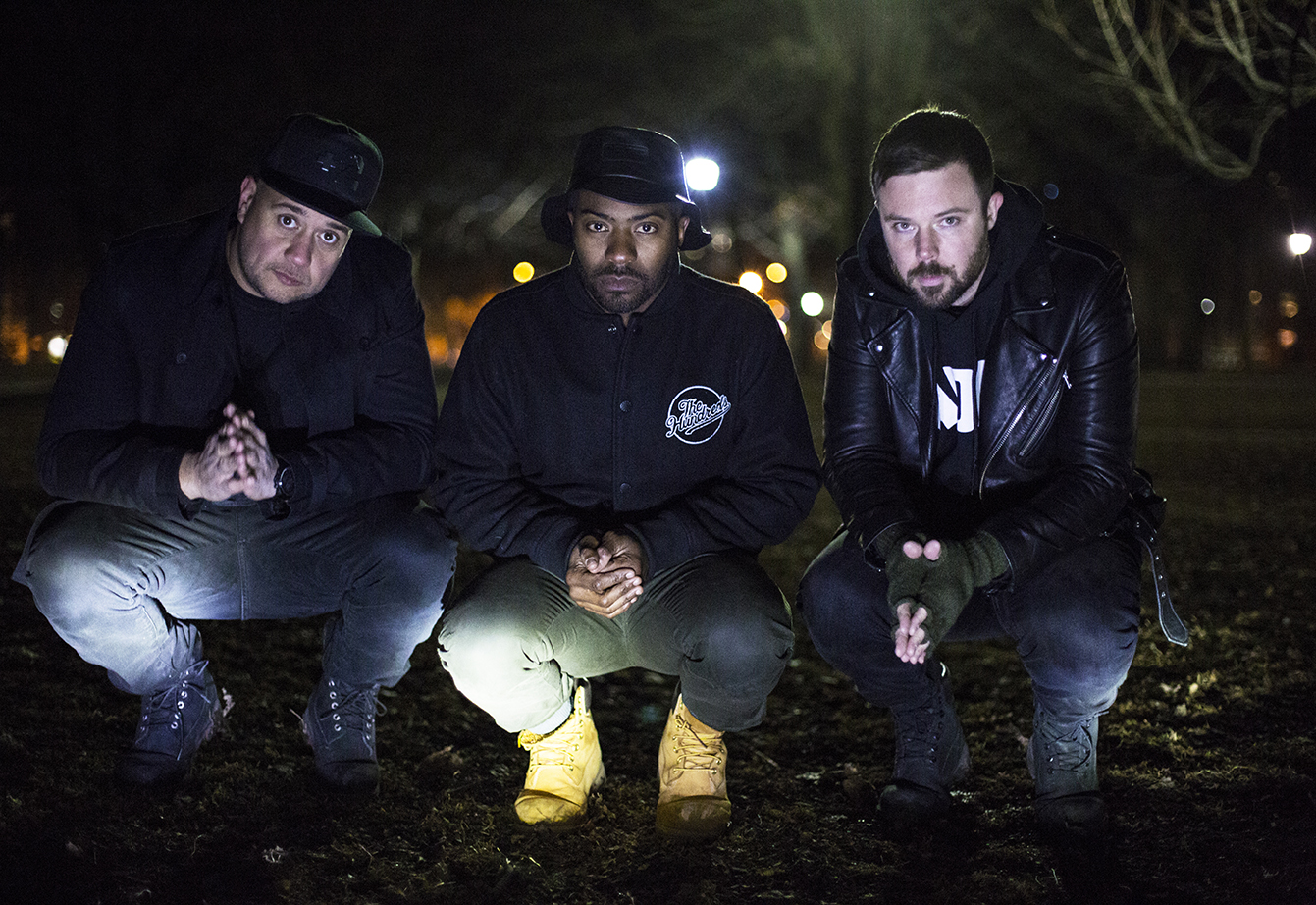
- Keys N Krates members 2019

Background information
- Origin: Toronto, Ontario, Canada
- Genres: Electronic; hip hop
- Years active: 2008-present
- Labels: Dim Mak Records, Mad Decent
- Members: Jr. Flo; Matisse; Adam Tune
- Website: www.keysnkrates.com

Keys N Krates is a Canadian electronic music band formed in 2008 out of Toronto, Ontario. The group consists of drummer Adam Tune, keyboardist David Matisse, and turntablist Jr. Flo (Greg Dawson). The band started as a live hip-hop act reliant on rough a cappella loops on top of heavy bass-driven beats. The band has had their music synced via EA Sports, FIFA, SkySports/SoccerAM, Toronto Raptors, Apple, and more.

== Career ==
=== 2013–2017: Debut ===
In 2013, Keys N Krates released their EP titled SOLOW on Steve Aoki's Dim Mak Records. The first single off of the EP, "Treat Me Right" was premiered on Annie Mac's BBC Radio 1 program and received support from electronic music artists Diplo, Major Lazer, Flosstradamus, and TNGHT.

Their second single off of SOLOW, "Dum Dee Dum" was also premiered on Annie Mac's BBC Radio 1 program. The music video for "Dum Dee Dum" was directed by Amos LeBlanc. The video was nominated for a Prism Prize in Canada, as well as a Berlin Music Video Award in Germany. Keys N Krates later remixed the track which featured G.O.O.D. Music's Cyhi The Prynce, King Louie, and Tree. On September 23, 2016, "Dum Dee Dum" was certified Gold by The Recording Industry Association of America for selling 500,000 units.

In June 2014, Keys N Krates teamed up with Canadian producer/DJ Grandtheft and released the single Keep It 100 on Diplo's Mad Decent Records. The single was later featured in a television ad for the animated film Minions (2015).

In September 2014, Keys N Krates released their second EP via Dim Mak Records titled Every Nite. The first single off of the EP titled "Are We Faded" was premiered on Annie Mac's BBC Radio 1 program as well as the YouTube channel All Trap Music. The release of Every Nite ran in conjunction with the band's first headline tour across North America.

In June 2015, Keys N Krates released the single "Save Me" featuring British pop singer/songwriter Katy B. The single was featured on Pitchfork Magazine and was later nominated for 'Dance Recording Of The Year' at the 2016 JUNO Awards. The Fader premiered their next single, "U Already Know", online and announced the release of their next EP titled Midnite Mass along with a coinciding tour. The track "Nothing But Space", featuring Aqui, off of Midnite Mass was premiered on Zane Lowe's Beats 1 Radio program on January 6, 2016.

On January 15, 2016, Keys N Krates released Midnite Mass making it their third EP release on Dim Mak Records. The release ran in conjunction with the Midnite Mass Tour, with dates across the United States and Canada featuring support acts Stooki Sound, Hermitude, GANZ, and Jesse Slayter.

=== 2018–2022: Cura and Original Classic ===
On February 2, 2018, Keys N Krates released their debut album Cura on Dim Mak Records. The album consists of nine songs and features artists such as New Orleans–based R&B singer/songwriter Ambré Perkins, Tory Lanez, and hip-hop artist 070 Shake (G.O.O.D. Music). Keys N Krates also set out on the 'Cura World Tour', with dates spanning across the United States, Canada, United Kingdom, Germany, Austria, Netherlands, Hungary and more

In July 2019, Keys N Krates self-released a new project titled A Beat Tape For Your Friends. On a statement released by the band, the project displays them "paying homage" to beloved influences like J Dilla's Donuts. The all instrumental project is composed of 11 tracks and features California-based producer Jansport J. Subsequent to the project's release, Keys N Krates embarked on a tour spanning across the US and Canada.

On November 12, 2021, Keys N Krates released their album Original Classic on Last Gang Records. Complex Magazine called the album, "A richer musical niche [with] balmy Brazilian melodies, vibrant Bollywood samples, and other such offbeat elements." The album consists of 13 tracks, including singles "Original Classic" and "Pull Up" and featured artists such as Juicy J, Chip, Haviah Mighty, Lido Pimienta, and Marbl. The Original Classic Deluxe album was released in September 2022, and included remixes from Soul Clap, Justin Martin, TEK.LUN, Byron The Aquarius, and more.

=== Since 2023 ===
On November 10, 2023, Keys N Krates released their third studio album, In: Tension via Last Gang Records, along with the album's fourth single "Fantasy", in collaboration with American singer, Ciara.

== Discography ==
=== Albums ===
- Cura (2018)
- Original Classic (2021)
- In: Tension (2023)

=== Extended plays ===
- Blackout (2011)
- Lucid Dreams (2013)
- Solow (2013)
- Every Nite (2014)
- Midnite Mass (2016)
- A Beat Tape For Your Friends (2019)

=== Singles ===
- "Treat Me Right" (2013)
- "Dum Dee Dum" (2013) (US: Gold)
- "Keep It 100" (2014)
- "Are We Faded" (2014)
- "Save Me" (featuring Katy B) (2015)
- "I Know U" (2015)
- "U Already Know" (2015)
- "Glitter" (featuring Ambré Perkins) (2017)
- "Flute Loop" (featuring Ouici) (2017)
- "Do What U Do" (2018)
- "My Night" (featuring 070 Shake) (2018)
- "My Soul Is Falling" (2018)
- "Getaway" (featuring Mickey Shiloh) (2018)
- "Get Up" (2022)
- "What Girls Do" (2023)
- "Fantasy" (with Ciara) (2023)

== Awards and nominations ==
Year	Organization	Award	Nominated work	Result
2014	The Association for Music and Innovative Arts	Prism Prize	"Dum Dee Dum"	Nominated
2014	The Berlin Music Video Awards	Video of the Year	"Dum Dee Dum"	Nominated
2014	Much Music Video Awards	Dance Video of the Year	"Dum Dee Dum"	Nominated
2015	Much Music Video Awards	Best EDM/Dance Video	"Keep It 100" - Grandtheft & Keys N Krates	Won
2015	Much Music Video Awards	Best Director	"Keep It 100" - Grandtheft & Keys N Krates	Nominated
2015	Much Music Video Awards	Best MUCHFact Video	"Keep It 100" - Grandtheft & Keys N Krates	Nominated
2016	Juno Awards	Dance Recording of the Year	"Save Me" (feat. Katy B)	Won
2016	The Recording Industry Association of America	Gold Certification	"Dum Dee Dum"	Won
2019	Juno Awards	Dance Recording of the Year	"Cura"	Nominated
2021	A21M Libera Awards	Dance Album of the Year	"Original Classic"	Nominated
2022	Berlin Music Video Awards	Best Editor	PULL UP	Nominated
