= KDA (DJ) =

English DJ

Kris Di Angelis
- Born: Kris Di Angelis; London, England
- Genres: House
- Occupations: DJ; record producer
- Years active: 2014–present
- Labels: Ministry of Sound

Kris Di Angelis (better known by his stage name KDA) is a house music producer and DJ from London. He is best known for his 2015 song "Rumble", which was first released on Ministry of Sound, but was subsequently reworked featuring vocals from Tinie Tempah and Katy B titled "Turn the Music Louder (Rumble)".

== Career ==
Known for his work in LGBT clubs, Kris Di Angelis started making remixes to play. In 2010, through a contract with Sony Music, became the official DJ of London Fashion Week. To reach a larger audience, he began to hide his identity and decided to use his initials as a pseudonym.

On 16 October 2015, KDA released his debut single "Turn the Music Louder (Rumble)", the song features vocals from Tinie Tempah and Katy B. The song premiered on Annie Mac's radio show as the "Hottest Record in the World" on 2 September 2015, and it was BBC Radio 1's Track of the Day on 30 September 2015. On 19 October 2015, the song was at number one on The Official Chart Update in the UK. On 23 October 2015, the song entered the UK Singles Chart at number one, making it KDA and Katy B's first number one single in the UK and Tinie Tempah's seventh number one. "Turn the Music Louder (Rumble)" has now gone Platinum in the UK and sold over 600,000 units. In 2018, KDA assumes its identity again.

== Discography ==
=== Singles ===
Title	Year	Peak chart positions				Certifications	Album
Title	Year	UK	BEL (FL)	IRE	SCO	Certifications	Album
"Rumble"	2015	—	—	—	—		Non-album single
"Turn the Music Louder (Rumble)" (featuring Tinie Tempah and Katy B)	2015	1	— (Note: "Turn the Music Louder (Rumble)" did not enter the Ultratop 50, but peaked at number 24 on the Flemish Ultratip chart.)	55	2	BPI: Platinum	Honey (Note: The version of "Turn the Music Louder (Rumble)" included on the Honey album does not contain Tinie Tempah's vocals and contains more verses sung by Katy B.)
"Just Say" (featuring Tinashe)	2016	88	— (Note: "Just Say" did not enter the Ultratop 50, but peaked at number 37 on the Flemish Ultratip chart.)	—	49	BPI: Silver	Non-album single
"Hate Me" (featuring Patrick Cash)	2017	—	—	—	—		Non-album single
"So Real (Warriors)" (with Too Many Zooz featuring Jess Glynne)	2018	—	—	—	—		Always in Between (Note: "So Real (Warriors)" was included on the deluxe edition of Always in Between.)
"Sex Magick"	2019	—	—	—	—		Non-album single
"The Human Stone" (featuring Angie Stone)	2019	—	—	—	—		Non-album single
"60 Rock"	2019	—	—	—	—		Non-album single

=== Remixes ===
Title	Year	Artist(s)	Album
"Living Out Loud" (KDA Remix)	2016	Brooke Candy and Sia	Non-album single
