= Slimzee =

English DJ, radio broadcaster and record label founder

- Also known as: Slimfast
- Born: Dean Fullman; 20 June 1978 (age 48)
- Origin: Bow, London, England
- Genres: grime; UK garage; jungle; drum and bass; dubstep
- Occupations: DJ; radio broadcaster; record producer; record label founder
- Years active: 1994 to present
- Labels: Slimzos Recordings; Rotpot Records; 2002 Records
- Website: djslimzee.com

Dean Fullman (born 20 June 1978), known professionally as Slimzee, is an English DJ, radio broadcaster, record producer and record label founder from Bow, London. He co-founded Rinse FM in 1994 and became known for pirate radio broadcasts that combined unreleased instrumentals, exclusive dubplates and live performances by MCs who became central to the development of grime.

Slimzee was a founding member of the Pay As U Go Cartel and was closely associated with the early careers of Wiley, Dizzee Rascal, D Double E, Riko Dan and other East London MCs. He received a gold disc in recognition of his contribution to Dizzee Rascal's debut album, Boy in da Corner.

After a period of reduced broadcasting, he returned to regular radio through NTS Radio in 2014 and later resumed programmes on Rinse FM.

== Career ==
=== Early DJ work and pirate radio ===
Fullman began DJing during the development of London's jungle and pirate radio scenes. He initially used the name Slimfast, which was later shortened to Slimzee.

In 1994, Slimzee co-founded Rinse FM with Geeneus. During approximately three years of the station's early operation, its studio was based in Fullman's home. Rinse initially concentrated on jungle before increasingly broadcasting UK garage and darker instrumental music developing in East London during the late 1990s.

=== Pay As U Go and the emergence of grime ===
Slimzee became a founding member of Pay As U Go Cartel, a UK garage collective that included Wiley, DJ Target, Maxwell D, God's Gift, Plague, Major Ace and Geeneus. The collective's movement from UK garage towards darker, more sparse and MC focused music formed part of the transition towards grime.

From the late 1990s, Slimzee began introducing darker garage productions into his sets. His Sunday afternoon Rinse FM programme became a regular platform for unreleased instrumentals, dubplates and live MC performances during grime's formative period.

Artists appearing on his early broadcasts included Dizzee Rascal, Wiley, D Double E, Riko Dan, Skepta, Jammer, Durrty Goodz, Maxwell D, Scratchy and Trim.

The programmes functioned as live performance spaces in which MCs developed bars over instrumentals that were often unavailable commercially. Slimzee's access to exclusive records also allowed particular tracks and producers to be tested through radio before wider release. Writing in 2007, Pitchfork described his influence and vision during 2002 and 2003 and noted that leading MCs regularly appeared on his sets before receiving wider recognition.

Following the success of Dizzee Rascal's Boy in da Corner, Slimzee received a gold disc recognising his contribution to the album and Rascal's development.

=== 2005 legal case and broadcasting break ===
In 2005, Fullman admitted operating an unlicensed radio station and causing damage while erecting broadcast equipment. He received a three year conditional discharge.

At the request of Tower Hamlets Council, he was also given an anti-social behaviour order preventing him from entering the roof of any building over four storeys without permission. The order was reported as the first of its kind involving a pirate radio broadcaster.

The case ended Slimzee's regular pirate broadcasts. He continued to take live bookings and make occasional radio appearances during the following years.

=== Return through NTS Radio and Rinse FM ===
Slimzee returned to regular broadcasting on NTS Radio in April 2014 through Slimzos Sessions with Slimzee. The programme focused on dark garage, classic grime, unreleased instrumentals and contemporary 140 music.

Guests documented by NTS included P Money, Jammz, AJ Tracey, Novelist, Trim, Riko Dan, Trends, Mumdance, Capo Lee, Elf Kid, PK, Nico Lindsay and Sir Pixalot. The programmes connected archive material and early grime practices with a later generation of performers and producers.

In February 2016, Slimzee and Wiley reunited for a Rinse FM broadcast that Fact selected as one of the week's notable mixes.

In April 2023, Slimzee announced that he was stepping down from his regular Rinse FM residency after more than twenty years. He later resumed broadcasting on the station. Rinse FM's archive lists programmes and filmed sessions during 2024 and 2025, including appearances with Boylan, D Double E, Riko Dan and AS.IF KID.

In May 2024, Slimzee appeared in the first episode of Rinse FM's Geeneus in Conversation series, produced as part of the station's thirtieth anniversary. The filmed interview covered the pirate period of Rinse FM and the station's early development.

=== Production and collaborations ===
Alongside his DJ and radio work, Slimzee has released productions with Boylan, Trends, AS.IF KID, U.S.F, Uman and SYXX. NTS lists releases including “Sidewinder Style” with Trends, Delta City and No Cure with Boylan, “Log Off” with Geeneus and “Ninety Nine” with Trends and Boylan.

In 2023, Slimzee, Boylan and Riko Dan released “Mile End” as the first release on a label launched by the London club institution FWD. Mixmag reported that the track developed through Slimzee's regular studio work with Boylan.

In April 2025, Manuka released a project credited to Slimzee and Boylan featuring Oil Gang. The release contained “Trunk”, “Chessle” and “Air Raid”.

Recent Slimzos projects have included repeated work with Uman and SYXX. Slimzee and Uman contributed “Fizz” and “Deep Inside the Mind” to Time Volume 8. SYXX appeared on consecutive compilations with “Psycho VIP” and “Concrete Dub”, and was jointly credited with Slimzee on Disappearing Dubs 029.

=== Selected radio and filmed sessions ===
Year	Station or platform	Featured performers	Notes
2002	Rinse FM	Dizzee Rascal, Durrty Goodz and Maxwell D	Archive radio session later highlighted by Fact
2013	Boiler Room	Riko Dan	Live grime session
2015	Boiler Room	Riko Dan, Maxwell D and Major Ace	Eskimo Dance takeover at the ICA
2016	Rinse FM	Wiley	Reunion broadcast
2024	Rinse FM	Geeneus	Filmed oral history produced for Rinse FM's thirtieth anniversary

== Style and influence ==
Slimzee's DJ style became associated with rapid mixing, sparse instrumentals and access to exclusive dubplates. Fact noted that some records in his collection were one off tracks made specifically for him and that leading grime MCs regularly hosted his programmes.

His Rinse FM broadcasts placed several MCs together in live sessions and treated instrumentals as a basis for freestyles, clashes and repeated vocal interpretations. This approach connected grime with earlier jungle and UK garage sound system practices.

Pitchfork described the early 2000s as the height of Slimzee's influence and vision, writing that he had access to dark proto grime anthems on exclusive dubplate and that emerging MCs frequently appeared on his sets before wider recognition.

Mixmag has described Slimzee as an influential Rinse FM co-founder whose broadcasts helped bring grime and dubstep sounds forward during the late 1990s and early 2000s. His later work through Slimzos Recordings and TowerBlock Radio has continued his emphasis on independent distribution, new artists and underground broadcasting.

== Documentaries, exhibitions and oral history ==
Slimzee has appeared in documentary and oral history projects concerning grime and pirate radio. He appeared in 8 Bar: The Evolution of Grime, directed by Ewen Spencer and broadcast through the BBC's Storyville strand.

London Museum's public history material identifies Rinse FM, Slimzee and Geeneus within the infrastructure through which grime artists developed audiences before mainstream radio support.

In 2024, Rinse FM's Geeneus in Conversation series recorded Slimzee's account of the station's pirate period as part of its thirtieth anniversary activity.

Year	Title	Format	Role
2013	Riko and Slimzee OG grime session	Boiler Room broadcast	DJ
2022	Grime Stories: From the Corner to the Mainstream	Museum display	Archive subject
2023	8 Bar: The Evolution of Grime	Documentary film	Interview contributor
2024	Geeneus in Conversation with Slimzee	Filmed oral history	Interview subject
2026	I'm The Frequency That Built Grime	Long form podcast interview	Interview subject

== Discography ==
=== Mix albums ===
- 2002: Sidewinder Studio Mix, with Dizzee Rascal and Wiley
- 2003: Street Beats, with God's Gift
- 2004: Bingo Beats Volume 3

=== Live recordings ===
- 2002: Sidewinder Live, recorded on Rinse FM with Dizzee Rascal
- 2007: FWD and Rinse Live at The End, various artists

=== Slimzos Recordings releases involving Slimzee ===
Year	Release	Artist credit	Type	Catalogue number
2017	The Slimzee vs AS.IF KID EP	Slimzee and AS.IF KID	EP	SLIMZOSDIGITAL005
2017	Judgment Day EP	Slimzee and AS.IF KID	EP	SLIMZOS011
2017	“Rattle Snake”	Slimzee and AS.IF KID	Digital single	Not stated
2018	Judgement Day: The Remix EP	Slimzee, AS.IF KID and various remixers	Remix EP	SLIMZOSDIGITAL009
2018	SLIMZOS 013	Trends and Slimzee	Single	SLIMZOS013
2019	“MindGames”	Slimzee and Trends	Track from Time	SLIMZOSDIGITAL013
2020	The USB 3 EP	Boylan, Slimzee and U.S.F	EP	SLIMZOSDIGITAL020
2020	“Try Not to Die”	U.S.F, Slimzee and Boylan featuring Kiara	Track from Time Volume 3	Not stated
2025	“PumpUpTheJam”	Boylan, Slimzee and DOK	Track from Time Volume 7	Not stated
2026	“Fizz”	Slimzee and Uman	Track from Time Volume 8	Not stated
2026	“Deep Inside the Mind”	Slimzee and Uman	Track from Time Volume 8	Not stated
2026	Disappearing Dubs 016	Slimzee and Uman	Limited digital EP	Not stated
2026	Disappearing Dubs 029	Slimzee and SYXX	Limited digital EP	Not stated

=== Selected releases on other labels ===
Year	Release	Artist credit	Label	Catalogue number
2004	Bingo Beats Volume 3	Slimzee	Bingo Beats	BINGOCD005
2018	Delta City	Slimzee and Boylan	Nomine Sound	Not stated
2018	No Cure EP	Boylan and Slimzee	Nomine Sound	NS007
2020	“Log Off”	Geeneus and Slimzee	Dump Valve Recordings	Not stated
2020	“The Mould”	Boylan, Slimzee and U.S.F	Sentry Records	SEN014
2022	LDNMSV EP	Boylan and Slimzee	Nomine Sound	NS018
2023	“Ninety Nine”	Trends, Boylan and Slimzee	Sneaker Social Club	SNKR045
2023	“Mile End”	Slimzee, Boylan and Riko Dan	FWD	Not stated
2023	“Mile End: Zero Remix”	Slimzee, Boylan and Riko Dan	FWD	Not stated
2023	“Mile End: Tsuki Remix”	Slimzee, Boylan and Riko Dan	FWD	Not stated
2024	“Mile End: Soukah Remix”	Slimzee, Boylan and Riko Dan	Independent remix	Not stated
2025	Slimzee and Boylan featuring Oil Gang	Slimzee, Boylan and Oil Gang	Manuka	MNKXX3
