= Easy Please Me =

Single by Katy B

from the album On a Mission
- B-side: "Easy Please Me (Caspa Remix)"
- Released: 3 June 2011
- Recorded: 2010
- Length: 3:56
- Label: Columbia, Rinse
- Songwriter(s): Katy B; Benga Adejumo; Arthur Smith; Oliver Jones
- Producer(s): Magnetic Man

Katy B singles chronology
"Broken Record" (2011)	"Easy Please Me" (2011)	"Witches' Brew" (2011)

Music video
- "Easy Please Me" on YouTube

"Easy Please Me" is a song by British singer-songwriter Katy B from her debut album On a Mission (2011). It was released as the album's fourth single on 3 June 2011, and reached number 25 in the UK charts.

== Music video ==
The music video was released on 21 May 2011, and features Katy and two friends in a pool club. Katy does various activities including hustling at pool, then she and her friends are chased out by a bailiff at the end and escape with money as they drive off.

== Composition ==
The song is written in pure harmonic minor, which is a rare instance in popular music. Its key signature is B♭ minor and it follows the harmonic chord progression of F—B♭m—G♭—E♭m—F (the E♭m is a passing chord). The song has an electronica influence. It provides a subtle vocal harmony, extensive vamping and emphasis on instrumental arranging.

== Track listing ==
Digital download
No.	Title	Length
1.	"Easy Please Me" (Caspa Remix)	4:15
2.	"Easy Please Me" (Royal-T Remix)	4:41
3.	"Easy Please Me" (Claude VonStroke's Grizzl-fiyah Mix)	4:55

Promo CD single
No.	Title	Length
1.	"Easy Please Me" (clean version)	3:55
2.	"Easy Please Me" (album version)	3:56

== Charts ==
=== Weekly charts ===
Chart (2011)	Peak position
Belgium (Ultratop 50 Flanders)	16
Scotland (OCC)	40
UK Singles (OCC)	25
UK Dance (OCC)	10

=== Year-end charts ===
Chart (2011)	Position
UK Singles Chart	199

== Release history ==
Country	Date	Format
United Kingdom	3 June 2011	Digital download
