= On a Mission (Katy B album) =

Studio album by Katy B
- Released: 1 April 2011
- Recorded: 1 June 2007 – 10 December 2010
- Genre: Dance; dubstep; UK garage; drum and bass; rave; UK funky; electronica; house; breakbeat; R&B
- Length: 56:01
- Label: Rinse; Columbia
- Producer: Benga; Geeneus (also exec.); Magnetic Man; Zinc

Katy B chronology
On a Mission (2011)	Little Red (2014)

Singles from On a Mission
- 1. "Katy on a Mission" Released: 22 August 2010; 2. "Perfect Stranger" Released: 1 October 2010; 3. "Lights On" Released: 10 December 2010; 4. "Broken Record" Released: 25 March 2011; 5. "Easy Please Me" Released: 3 June 2011; 6. "Witches' Brew" Released: 28 August 2011

On a Mission is the debut studio album by British singer Katy B. The album was released on 1 April 2011, by Rinse and Columbia Records and in the United States on 13 September. Katy worked with producers and writers DJ Zinc, Benga, and Rinse FM founder Geeneus. Katy had been recording songs for the album since June 2007 and continued recording for three years until December 2010. The album was heavily influenced by the singer's life experiences and her journey into the music world.

The album received positive reviews from music critics. Many appreciated the album's sound, deeming it original, sharp, thrilling, solid and brilliant and others. The lyrical content received heavy praise, liking Katy's projection of emotion in to the work and the messages it sends out. Lyrically, the majority of the album's songs are based on Katy's life experiences of love, heartbreak, boys, and clubbing. Musically, On a Mission is rooted in the electronic dance genre, while incorporating elements of dubstep, UK garage, UK funky, house and R&B in its production and beats. The album debuted at number 2 in the United Kingdom. The album was nominated for the 2011 Barclaycard Mercury Prize.

The album had a total of five singles released between 2010 and 2011. The first two singles from the album, "Katy on a Mission" and "Lights On", were released on 22 August – 10 December 2010 and peaked in the United Kingdom in the top five, reaching number five and four respectively on the UK Singles (The Official Charts Company). The third single, "Broken Record", was released to commercial success in the UK, peaking at number eight on the charts. The last two singles from the album, "Easy Please Me" and "Witches' Brew", failed to mimic the success of the first two singles from the album, peaking at number twenty-five and one hundred twenty-eight on the charts. Her Magnetic Man collaboration, "Perfect Stranger", released on 1 October 2010 was also included on the album. As of January 2012, UK sales stand at 185,533 copies according to The Guardian.

== Composition ==
On a Mission is an album structured in the electronic dance music genre, incorporating its subgenres, including dubstep, UK garage, UK funky, house, rave, and drum and bass. The album also takes subtle influences of Contemporary R&B and 90s dance music. The album most notably showcases Katy B's warm, natural vocals with a feel of hostility and flirtatiousness emanating through the songs. The music on the album has been compared to notable acts in the United Kingdom like the Sugababes in the early stages of their careers, Basement Jaxx, Kathy Diamond, and Lily Allen. The songs are rich in melodies, hooks and on-point lyrics. The lyrical content is centered on themes of relationships turning bitter and envious, boy troubles, and clubbing in London, noted by many critics, from a rare genuine and frank perspective.

"Easy Please Me" is a dubstep song that features a casual rhyme and some humor in its lyrics, poking fun at rude-boy mentality. The production of the track is centered on bouncy rakish beats and ringtone synths. "Perfect Stranger" features influences of ecstatic jungle sounds and a bassline reminiscent of UK funky and dubstep music. "Broken Record" is a song a "like-a-bro-ken rec-ooooord" hook that is repeated near the end of the song with influences of techno, drum and bass and electro. The vocals on the track range from melodic to intense to ambiguous. The song is similar in sound to the song "Let Me Be Your Fantasy" by Baby D. "Katy on a Mission" features the use of strong vocals over sounds of buzzing electronic synthesizers, chunky, stuttering beats and soulful, cooing hooks. "Witches' Brew" was written about sly seduction. Its production is centered on synthesizers, breakbeats and influences of neo soul tones and electro.

Two songs from the album, "Power on Me" and "Go Away", are about the dynamics of relationships. "Power on Me" displays vulnerability in Katy's vocals and is built over a funky house groove with synth tones similar to those by Axel-F. "Go Away" is structured as a downtempo trip hop and trance ballad. "Disappear" is an introspective track about love and identity that features jungle sounds. The production of "Hard to Get" is centered on an acid jazz sound with the use of trumpet. Near the end of the song, Katy gives shout-outs to her family and friends. "Lights On" is a ragga-tinged song that features Ms Dynamite. "Movement" features the influence of house music.

== Critical reception ==
Professional ratings
Aggregate scores
Source	Rating
AnyDecentMusic?	7.5/10
Metacritic	76/100
Review scores
Source	Rating
AllMusic	4/5 stars
The Daily Telegraph	3/5 stars
Entertainment Weekly	B+
The Guardian	4/5 stars
The Independent	3/5 stars
NME	8/10
Pitchfork	8.1/10
Q	4/5 stars
Rolling Stone	3.5/5 stars
Spin	8/10

On a Mission was well received by most music critics. At Metacritic, which assigns a normalized rating out of 100 based on reviews from mainstream critics, the album received an average score of 76, based on 23 reviews. Natalie Shaw of BBC Music wrote that it "moves through house, dubstep, drum’n’bass, rave, UK garage and RnB with ease, attacking each with such accessibility it’s not hard to imagine each track topping the singles charts". She described the production as "sharp and cutting throughout, never losing its feverish hi-NRG" and noticed that Katy B is "a new breed of singer, adding a vibrant gloss to a new combination of sounds with a charm and personality all of her own". Nate Patrin of Pitchfork called her "a genre-spanning pop singer who isn't tied down to a single thing, no matter how well it suits her" and felt that "what puts On a Mission over the top is Katy's way of expressing herself with emotions that extend past "wooo, druuunk" into more nuanced and detailed relationships with booming systems and the people who flock to them". Ben Hogwood of musicOMH praised Brien's ability of "projecting emotion" as well as her voice, saying it "could easily sing the front page of the South London Press and have you clamouring for more" and called the lyrics "brilliantly written, at times extremely profound while at others throwing off the shackles for a night's partying". Alexis Petridis of The Guardian wrote that Brien "scrupulously avoids the kind of melismatic over-singing that is the female pop star's usual lot in a post-TV talent show world" and felt that On a Mission "almost uniquely for pop music about clubbing, sounds like the work of someone's who's actually been to a club". Jon O'Brien of AllMusic defined it as "a strikingly self-assured and original affair which not only convincingly captures the sound of contemporary London nightlife, but also reflects the voices of much of her late-teens/early-twenties generation". Noel Gardner from Drowned in Sound called it "a sterling debut" and described it as "a pop album which comes off as written from life while also addressing the concerns of its audience". Marianne Halavage of The Herald found it "brilliant" and described it as "an urban electronic feast of everything from funky house to drum’n’bass and rave". Alex Denney of NME hailed it as "the British pop debut of the year".

Kitty Empire from The Observer called the songs on the album "12 solidly built tunes that reflect her love of the euphoric rush of clubbing, of falling in love and the comedowns in their wake", while Simon Price of The Independent described On a Mission as "a debut album of subtle, mature, intelligent electronic pop, reminiscent of Sugababes before it all went wrong" and felt that it "sounds like a modern pop classic". Eric Henderson of Slant Magazine felt that it is "a bright, cheerfully mainstream-friendly record that's almost completely built from the ingredients of much darker, grimier dance music subcultures" and noted that it "has already turned out some of the smartest dumb music in years". Rick Pearson of the Evening Standard called it "thrilling, original and utterly of the moment" and stated that "dance music has discovered a new star". Alex Macpherson from Fact noted that Katy B is doing "something that literally no one else is at the moment: personality-driven music with a distinctive feminine voice that’s deeply rooted in underground scenes, but whose blithe lack of concern for their phallocentrism erodes the self-imposed boundaries they set up" and called On a Mission "a significant landmark album for both British dance and British pop". Gavin Martin of the Daily Mirror wrote that Brien "effortlessly glides through a template that mixes dubstep, garage, house and grime on this appealing, user-friendly debut", while Robert Copsey from Digital Spy called the album "a collection of well-groomed songs loaded with earworm hooks, rich melodies and on-point lyrics that focus on music itself rather than homing in on a particular trend". Thomas H. Green of The Daily Telegraph described it as "efficient, likeable, club-friendly pop, with the house numbers less memorable than the drum and bass leanings". On Tuesday 19 July it had been announced that the album was one of the nominees for the 2011 Mercury Prize.

Pitchfork placed the album at number 34 on its list of the "Top 50 albums of 2011".

== Singles ==
"Katy on a Mission" was released as the album's lead single on 22 August 2010 through Rinse FM, where it debuted on the UK Singles Chart at number 5; also managing to top the dance chart and independent releases chart. "Perfect Stranger", a collaborative single between Katy and trio Magnetic Man also saw release; having been released through Columbia Records on 1 October 2010; where it debuted in the UK at number 16. Despite appearing on On a Mission (in a shorter edit), the single served as the second single for the album Magnetic Man.

"Lights On", featuring Ms Dynamite, was released as the album's second single on 10 December 2010 through Rinse FM and Columbia Records, where it debuted in the UK at number 4. The single features vocals from British MC Ms Dynamite. "Broken Record" was released as the album's third single on 25 March 2011. It charted on the UK Singles Chart at number 8 on 3 April 2011. "Easy Please Me" was released as the fourth single on 3 June 2011. It peaked at number 25 on UK Singles Chart. "Witches' Brew" was released as the fifth single on 28 August 2011. Katy herself confirmed via Twitter that she was filming a video for the track. The music video premiered on Vevo on 3 August 2011. A music video for the 5th track on the album, "Movement", was also released.

== Track listing ==
No.	Title	Writer(s)	Producer(s)	Length
1.	"Power on Me"	Katy B; Geeneus	Geeneus	4:21
2.	"Katy on a Mission"	Katy B; Benga	Benga	3:39
3.	"Why You Always Here"	Katy B; Geeneus	Geeneus	5:33
4.	"Witches' Brew"	Katy B; Zinc; Sam Frank	Zinc	3:20
5.	"Movement"	Katy B; Zinc	Zinc	2:41
6.	"Go Away"	Katy B; Geeneus; Magnetic Man	Geeneus	3:35
7.	"Disappear"	Katy B; Geeneus	Geeneus	3:38
8.	"Broken Record"	Katy B; Geeneus; Zinc	Geeneus; Zinc	3:19
9.	"Lights On" (featuring Ms Dynamite)	Katy B; Geeneus; Ms Dynamite	Geeneus	3:28
10.	"Easy Please Me"	Katy B; Magnetic Man	Magnetic Man	3:56
11.	"Perfect Stranger" (Magnetic Man featuring Katy B)	Katy B; Magnetic Man	Magnetic Man	3:13
12.	"Hard to Get" "Water" (hidden track)	Katy B; Magnetic Man; Geeneus; Zinc; Katy B; Geeneus	Geeneus; Zinc; Geeneus	15:18

UK iTunes bonus tracks
No.	Title	Writer(s)	Length
13.	"Water"	Geeneus; Katy B	3:15
14.	"Something New"	Katy B; Zinc	3:32
15.	"Katy on a Mission" (music video)		3:15

US iTunes bonus tracks
No.	Title	Writer(s)	Length
13.	"Louder"	Katy B; Zinc	4:36

== Personnel ==
Credits adapted from On a Mission album liner notes.

- Katy B – lead vocals, co-writer
- Ms. Dynamite – featuring artist, vocals, co-writer
- Magnetic Man – featuring artist, producer, engineer
- Geeneus – engineer, producer
- DJ Zinc – engineer, mixing, keys
- Benga – engineer, mixing
- Makoto – keys
- Sam Frank – additional vocals
- Jake Edwards-Wood – keys
- Martin Shaw – trumpet
- Stuart Hawkes – mastering
- Sandrine Dulermo & Michael Labica – photography
- Give Up Art – design

== Charts ==
=== Weekly charts ===
Chart (2011–2012)	Peak position
Belgian Albums (Ultratop Flanders)	10
Belgian Alternative Albums (Ultratop Flanders)	6
Belgian Albums (Ultratop Wallonia)	70
Irish Albums (IRMA)	66
Polish Albums Chart	68
Scottish Albums (OCC)	4
UK Albums (OCC)	2
UK Dance Albums (OCC)	1
US Top Dance Albums (Billboard)	16
US Heatseekers Albums (Billboard)	39

=== Year-end charts ===
Chart (2011)	Position
Belgian Albums Chart (Flanders)	83
UK Albums Chart	60

== Certifications ==
Region	Certification	Certified units/sales
United Kingdom (BPI)	Gold	100,000^{*}
^{*} Sales figures based on certification alone.

== Release history ==
Region	Date	Label
United Kingdom	1 April 2011	Rinse FM; Columbia
United States	13 September 2011	Columbia
