= Broken Record (Katy B song) =

Single by Katy B

from the album On a Mission
- B-side: "Broken Record" (DJ Fresh Future Jungle Mix)
- Released: 25 March 2011
- Recorded: 2010
- Genre: Breakbeat; electronica
- Length: 3:19
- Label: Rinse; Columbia
- Songwriters: Katy B; Geeneus; Zinc
- Producers: Geeneus; Zinc

Katy B singles chronology
| "Lights On" (2010) | "Broken Record" (2011) | "Easy Please Me" (2011) |

Music video
- "Broken Record" on YouTube

"Broken Record" is a song performed by British singer Katy B and serves as the third single from her debut album, On a Mission. It was released in the United Kingdom on 25 March 2011 as a digital download. It charted at number 8 on the UK Singles Chart on 3 April 2011.

== Critical reception ==
Robert Copsey of Digital Spy gave the song a positive review stating:

You could be forgiven for thinking Katy B is a bit of a hard nut - after all, she's already collaborated with hardened artistes of the garage/dubstep world Magnetic Man and Ms Dynami-tee-hee, both of whom you'd be a fool to mess with after a round of Red Stripes. However, one listen to her latest chart botherer and such fears simply melt away.

"I would toss and turn at night with your voice in my head," she confesses over a thumping garage beat reminiscent of late-'90s pop combined with a bang-on-trend D&B bassline. While the melody remains as grimey as her previous offerings, her vulnerable and grief-stricken vocal immediately softens the song's sharper edges, culminating in an achingly sad but sonically uplifting ending that Robyn would be proud to call her own. Hard nut? You don't fool us, Katy..

== Track listing ==
iTunes single
| No. | Title | Length |
|---|---|---|
| 1. | "Broken Record" | 3:19 |
| 2. | "Broken Record" (DJ Fresh Future Jungle Mix) | 2:58 |

iTunes Remixes EP
| No. | Title | Length |
|---|---|---|
| 1. | "Broken Record" (Jacques Greene Remix) | 5:04 |
| 2. | "Broken Record" (Zinc Remix) | 5:47 |
| 3. | "Broken Record" (Todd Edwards' Angel Voice Remix) | 5:15 |
| 4. | "Broken Record" (Geeneus Funky Mix) | 5:33 |
| 5. | "Broken Record" (DJ Fresh Future Jungle Mix) | 2:58 |

== Charts ==
=== Weekly charts ===
| Chart (2011) | Peak position |
|---|---|
| Belgium (Ultratip Bubbling Under Flanders) | 14 |
| Scottish Singles Sales (Official Charts) | 15 |
| UK Singles (Official Charts) | 8 |
| UK Dance (Official Charts) | 3 |

=== Year-end charts ===
| Chart (2011) | Position |
|---|---|
| UK Singles (OCC) | 163 |

== Release history ==
| Country | Date | Format |
|---|---|---|
| United Kingdom | 27 March 2011 | Digital download |
