= Katy on a Mission =

2010 single by Katy B

Single by Katy B

from the album On a Mission
- B-side: "Louder"
- Released: 22 August 2010
- Studio: Rinse & Zinc's
- Genre: Dubstep
- Length: 4:11 (single version); 3:39 (album version)
- Label: Rinse
- Songwriters: Katy B; Beni Adejumo
- Producer: Benga

Katy B singles chronology
"Katy on a Mission" (2010)	"Perfect Stranger" (2010)

Music video
- "Katy on a Mission" on YouTube

"Katy on a Mission" is a song performed by British recording artist Katy B. It was released by Rinse accompanied by a B-side titled "Louder" as her debut single and lead single from her debut album, On a Mission, on 22 August 2010. The song was co-written by Benga, Katy B and Geeneus, and produced by Benga. Musically, the song is constructed around beats, synths and a bassline found most prominent in the dubstep music genre. It achieved charting success in the United Kingdom where it topped the UK Dance Chart and UK Indie Chart while peaking at number five on the UK Singles Chart. The single was accompanied by a music video which was directed by Johny Mourgue.

The song has since been certified double platinum in the UK for selling over 1,200,000 copies.

== Background ==
Katy B had been working with British underground grime, garage and house record producers since the age of fifteen before debuting "Katy on a Mission" to her mainstream audience. The song, originally "just another dubstep track Katy was going to vocal," was written by Katy B and produced by British record producer Benga. In an interview with Kieran Yates of The Guardian, Katy mentioned that without Benga's beat, "Katy on a Mission" would have not been as successful. It was inspired by how Katy feels when she goes raving with her friends. Speaking to Greg Cochrane from the BBC, she explained:

Lyrics wise, usually dubstep makes me want to write about happy, love and dancing with my girls. This track didn't have that feel so I wanted to write about how it feels when you go into a club and there's so much energy in a room - basically putting that into words.

Fraser McAlpine of the BBC said that lyrically, the song has taken club bangers into their next phase by rather than being a club song about a club, it is instead a club song about how some things only make sense in a club situation. He further interpreted, "[The song] is about having a few relationship issues – with a DJ, no less – and how the music is the only thing that makes this sorry situation bearable." Technically, the bassline has an unusual 11 beats in 12 (three bars of four). This 11-beat underlies the main tune, and in live performances is performed by trumpet rather than synthesizer. Vocally, the track has a R&B style to it. Katy B began developing this style at the age of thirteen in addition to being influenced by rave music and the music of Destiny's Child and Ne-Yo. "Katy On a Mission" was playlisted on BBC Radio 1 for nearly two months and birthed acclaim that Katy B has become the 'female face of dubstep'. In response to the tag, Katy said: "It doesn't bother me if people wanna call it a dubstep song or call me a dubstep singer but I have done other stuff." Singing on dubstep was described by Katy as a different experience, "It can be a bit darker, and that's cool." Katy stated that what she loved about the song was the large amount of energy its instrumental had, deeming it as a main factor to the single's commercial success.

== Critical reception ==
"Katy on a Mission" received positive reviews from contemporary critics. Fraser McAlpine from the BBC felt that lyrically the song has a subtle but incredibly welcome refinement to it. He complimented the central refrain of the song saying, it "lingers in the mind like a family of mice lingers in quality wainscotting." McAlpine further highlighted the "stunning waterfall of decayed voices after the chorus" and its "beautiful production trick[s], applied to a lovely mournful melody, with smashing results." Nick Levine from Digital Spy called the track fairly sublime; "Over buzzing synths, a lovely blancmangey bassline and beats that manage to be chunky and nimble at the same time - like an overweight contortionist". Levine further said that the loads of ear-snagging "ooh-ooh-oooh-ooh-wooh" hooks acts as the icing of an already scrumptious cake. He went on to say while Katy B tries love, "With a tune as good as this, you don't need to think twice."

Paul Lester of The Guardian deemed the track as "shiny grime" with Mercury Prize-winning potential. Lester further complimented the song, saying: "Bass-heavy but definitely more of a song than a series of low-frequency bursts and blasts, it's the perfect balance of urban edge and smoov[sic] R&B/soul". While Louise Brailey of NME called the song a proper dance anthem, saying: "Her neo-soulful vocals lend a layer of slinky gloss over knotty dubstep swing and rubberised arpeggios, creating a centre-piece of rave that leads the wave of big-room dubstep breaking commercial spheres as we speak." Shawn Reynaldo of XLR8R felt that Benga toned down his trademark chainsaw wobble to a reasonable level, allow Katy B's soulful vocals to shine. The Fader's Julianne Escobedo Sheperd felt that the "angelic R&B warbles" and "shin-kicking synths" of the track are a similar cross over to Rusko and Amber Coffman's "Hold On" (2010).

== Commercial performance ==
"Katy on a Mission" debuted and peaked at number five on the UK Singles Chart issued on 4 September 2010. It was the second highest new entry of the week, behind Taio Cruz's "Dynamite" which debuted at number one. The single then dropped three places to number eight. It then spent four consecutive weeks at number eight and six consecutive weeks in the top ten. The song also topped the UK Dance Chart for two weeks, and the UK Indie Chart for three weeks. By 31 December, over 277,000 copies had been sold in the UK.

Within the UK, "Katy on a Mission" debuted and peaked at number ten on the Scottish regional chart on 4 September 2010. It was the third highest new entry for that week, behind Taio Cruz's "Dynamite" and Brandon Flowers' "Crossfire". The single also peaked at number twenty-one on the European Hot 100 Singles chart. It debuted at number twenty-nine on Flemish Belgium's Ultratip chart issued on 2 October 2010.

The song was covered by the Arctic Monkeys on BBC Radio 1's Live Lounge on 25 January 2012.

== Music video ==
The accompanying music video for "Katy on a Mission" was released by Rinse Records on 8 July 2010. The video features Katy and Benga in London nightclub Matter.

== Track listings ==
- Digital download
  (386311562, Released: 22 August 2010)
1. "Katy on a Mission" (Katie Brien, Beni Adejumo, Geeneus) – 4:11
2. "Louder" (Katie Brien, Benjamin Pettit)– 4:36
- Digital EP
  (387162709, Released: 30 August 2010)
1. "Katy on a Mission" – 4:11
2. "Louder" – 4:36

== Charts ==
=== Weekly charts ===
Chart (2010)	Peak position
Belgium (Ultratop 50 Flanders)	39
Belgium (Ultratip Bubbling Under Wallonia)	36
European Hot 100 Singles	21
Scotland Singles (OCC)	10
UK Singles (OCC)	5
UK Dance (OCC)	1
UK Indie (OCC)	1

=== Year-end charts ===
Chart (2010)	Position
UK Singles (OCC)	70

== Certifications ==
Region	Certification	Certified units/sales
United Kingdom (BPI)	2× Platinum	1,200,000^{‡}
^{‡} Sales+streaming figures based on certification alone.

== Release history ==
Country	Date	Format	Catalogue
Ireland	22 August 2010	Digital download	386311562
United Kingdom	22 August 2010	Digital download	386311562
Ireland	30 August 2010	Digital EP	387162709
United Kingdom	30 August 2010	Digital EP	387162709
