= Kate Simko =

American electronic music producer from Chicago

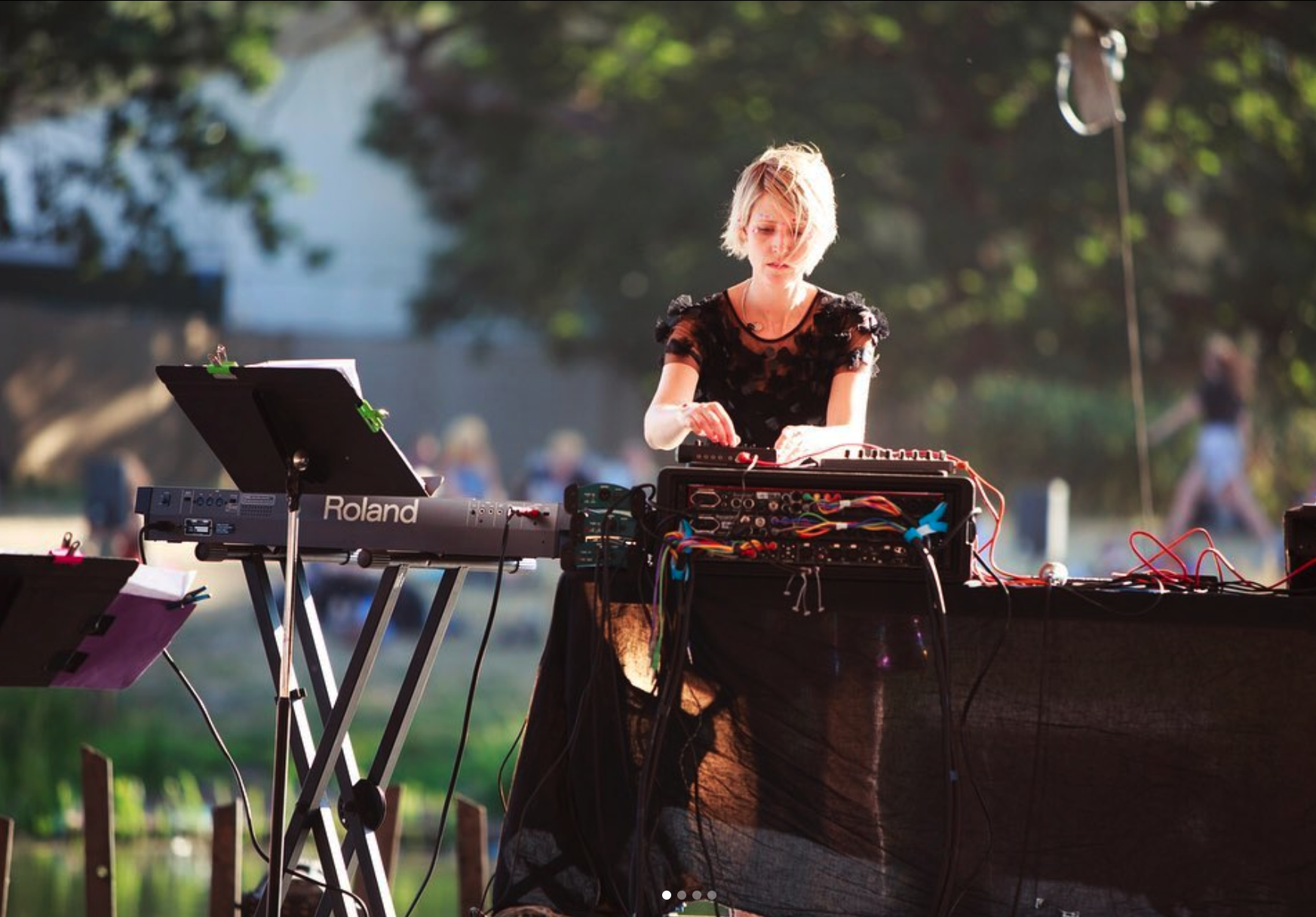

Background information
- Origin: United States
- Genres: Electronic, classical, film score, deep house, minimal techno
- Occupations: Musician, composer, producer
- Instrument: Piano
- Years active: 2000-present
- Labels: The Vinyl Factory, Ghostly International, Lakeshore Records, Decca Classics
- Member of: London Electronic Orchestra
- Website: www.katesimko.com

Kate Simko is an American composer, electronic music producer and founder of her ensemble London Electronic Orchestra.

Simko has scored various feature-length films, including "The Atom Smashers" (Ghostly International), "We Believe in Dinosaurs" and "Underplayed" (Lakeshore Records). In 2016, Simko released her self-titled album "Kate Simko & London Electronic Orchestra" on The Vinyl Factory to critical acclaim.

She was the first artist to perform electronic music at the National Gallery in London in 2014.

Simko is represented by composer agency Manners McDade, having signed a publishing deal in 2022.

== Background ==
Simko spent her childhood years studying piano and music theory. During her teens in Chicago, she fell in love with underground dance music, while also gaining a voracious appetite to hear new sounds. Her passion for electronic music eventually led to her to study music technology and piano at Northwestern University, while also directing the dance and hip-hop format of the respected radio station WNUR.

In 2001, Simko relocated for a music composition program in Santiago, Chile, where she met Andrés Bucci and they recorded their first record together as Detalles. Since then, she has returned to South America for numerous extended trips, recording more music with Bucci and playing shows in cities like Buenos Aires, Punta del Este and Caracas.

With roots in Chicago house and Detroit techno, Simko's music maintains a warm, soulful character, full of funky bass lines and driving rhythms. Reflecting her diverse background, her music crosses genre borders, blending rich textures and intricate programming with funky synth lines, thumping bass and groove. Her ever-changing live PA continues to be a highlight wherever she plays, at home or abroad. She has received press in The Wire, XLR8R, de:Bug, Mixmag, BPM and Remix, and her Detalles project was named one of the "Next 100" artists by URB magazine. A versatile DJ, Simko was named one of the Top 10 DJs in Chicago by XLR8R magazine.

Her work has been released on Traum Schallplatten and Kupei Musika, and been remixed by Thomas Brinkmann and Atom Heart, while she has remixed Philip Glass and Aeroc.

In 2009, Simko released Music from The Atom Smashers, the soundtrack to a documentary about physicists at Fermilab.

Simko's highly anticipated debut solo album Lights Out was released on Hello? Repeat records in June 2011.

Her song "Go On Then feat. Jem Cooke" topped deep house charts in 2012. In 2013 the song was licensed to the ABC television show Lucky 7 and Richie Hawtin's Enter.Ibiza 2013 compilation.

Simko has established her reputation as a performer with interactive audiovisual live sets and cutting-edge DJ mixes. She has played clubs and festivals around the world.

Simko was the first to perform electronic music at the National Gallery in London, in May 2013. She created original music inspired by the paintings in Room 34. In June 2014, she created custom compositions for Room 41.

Simko graduated with a master's in Composition for Screen from the Royal College of Music. In 2014, she debuted her project London Electronic Orchestra, which meshed her two major musical influences: live orchestra and electronic music.

Simko is currently based in London.

== Discography ==
- Kate Simko & London Electronic Orchestra 2xLP, CD, digital, The Vinyl Factory w/ London Electronic Orchestra (2016)
- Tilted EP, 12", The Vinyl Factory w/ London Electronic Orchestra (2016)
- Waiting Games Remix EP, 12", The Vinyl Factory w/ London Electronic Orchestra (2016)
- One Time Game, 12", w/ Jamie Jones, London Electronic Orchestra, Jem Cooke (2015)
- Theme Track EP, 12", digital, Last Night On Earth w/ Tevo Howard (2015)
- Your Love EP, 12", digital, No. 19 Music (2013)
- Lost in London EP, 12", digital, Get Physical Music (2013)
- Kabuki Drop EP, 12", digital, Leftroom Records (2012)
- Same Page EP, digital, Leftroom Records (2012)
- Lights Out LP, CD, digital, Hello? Repeat Records (2011)
- Mind On You, digital, Hello? Repeat Records (2011)
- Take You There, digital, Ghostly International (2009)
- Lost In Time 12", digital, Eklo Records (2009)
- Zhivago 12", digital, Spectral Sound (2009)
- Music from the Atom Smashers, digital-only soundtrack album, Ghostly International (2009)
- Gamelan / Margie's Groove, digital, Spectral Sound (2008)
- She Said EP, 12"/digital, Spectral Sound (2008)
- Cityscape 12"/EP, Kupei Musika w/ Jonas Bering (2007)
- Strumm 12"/EP, Kupei Musika (2006)

=== With Detalles ===
- Micros Morning CD/LP, Kupei Musika (2007)
- Hello Donee 12"/EP, Kupei Musika (2007)
- Shapes of Summer CD/LP, Traum (2003)

=== Appears on ===
- Cucusonic, 2xLP, The Vinyl Factory (2021)
- Defected Presents Most Rated 2013, digital, mix, ITH Records (2012)
- Richie Hawtin - Enter.Ibiza 2013, 4xCD, M_nus (2013)
- Death Is Nothing To Fear 3 12"/digital Spectral Sound (2008)
- Death Is Nothing To Fear EP, digital, Spectral Sound (2008)
