= Katy B =

British singer (born 1989)

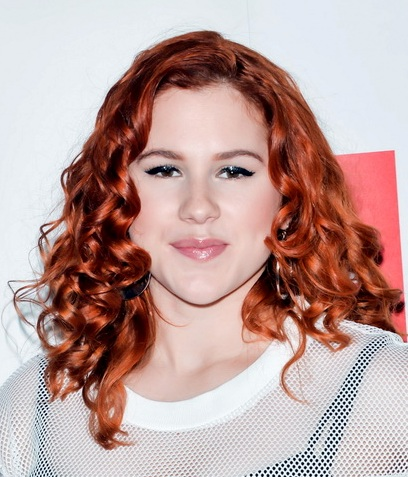
- Katy B at Argos digital store launch in London in October 2014

Background information
- Also known as: Baby Katy
- Born: Kathleen Anne Brien; 8 May 1989 (age 37); Peckham, London, England
- Genres: R&B; dubstep; electronic; dance; house; UK garage
- Occupations: Singer; songwriter; DJ
- Instrument: Vocals
- Years active: 2007–present
- Labels: Rinse; Columbia; Virgin EMI

Kathleen Anne Brien (born 8 May 1989) is an English singer. She released her debut studio album, On a Mission, in 2011, which spawned two top five hits, "Katy on a Mission" and "Lights On". In 2014 she released her second studio album, Little Red, which produced her third top five hit, "Crying for No Reason". Her third studio album, Honey, was released in 2016.

== Early life ==
Kathleen Anne Brien was born on 8 May 1989, in Peckham, London, where she attended at Lyndhurst Primary School, Haberdashers' Aske's Hatcham College, and the BRIT School. Katy also attended at the Glenlyn Academy in South London, where she took dance classes. Katy's father (David O'Brien) was a member of the Les Humphries Singers, who represented Germany at Eurovision Song Contest 1976, with the song "Sing Sang Song". Katy B possesses a soprano vocal range.

== Career ==
=== 2007–2012: On a Mission ===
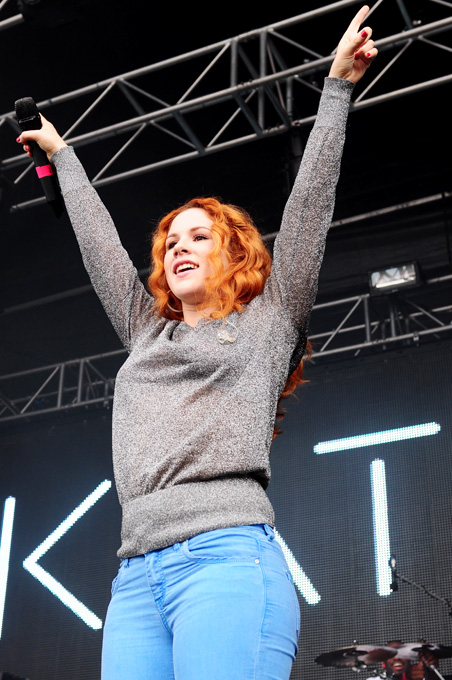
Katy B performing in 2011

Katy has guested on many tracks, both before and during her album release campaign. DJ NG's song "Tell Me", on which she featured as Baby Katy, was initially released on a white label and then later signed to Ministry of Sound. She also provided vocals on the track "Hold Me" for The Count & Sinden's debut album Mega Mega Mega, and features on Magnetic Man's tracks "Perfect Stranger" and "Crossover".

Katy B has also collaborated with Rinse FM DJ Geeneus to cover the Kevin Saunderson produced "Good Life" and the track "As I". It was following the official recognition of the former pirate radio station Rinse FM in June 2010 that Katy B saw her first single release: "Katy on a Mission", presented by Rinse and produced by Benga, was released on 22 August 2010. The single reached number five on the UK Singles Chart and number one on the UK Indie Chart.

Katy B performed at the London Jazz Festival in 2009 with Ms Dynamite, who also featured on Katy's second single "Lights On", which was released in the United Kingdom on 19 December 2010, and debuted at number four on the UK Singles Chart. Her third single "Broken Record" was released in March 2011, and peaked at number eight. The fourth single "Easy Please Me" was released on 3 June 2011. Her fifth single "Witches' Brew" was released on 28 August 2011. Katy's debut album On a Mission was released on 4 April 2011, and peaked at number two on the UK Albums Chart.

Katy B supported Tinie Tempah on his tour during Spring of 2011, and on 30 April 2011 she embarked on her own debut concert tour throughout Europe until September, then the UK in October. In 2011, Katy B and Mark Ronson teamed up for the song "Anywhere in the World", which was created as an advert for Coca-Cola to tie in with the 2012 Summer Olympics, and was released as a digital download on 30 March 2012. Katy released a song featuring Iggy Azalea and Diplo, titled "Light as a Feather" from her "Danger EP" in December 2012.

=== 2013–2014: Little Red ===
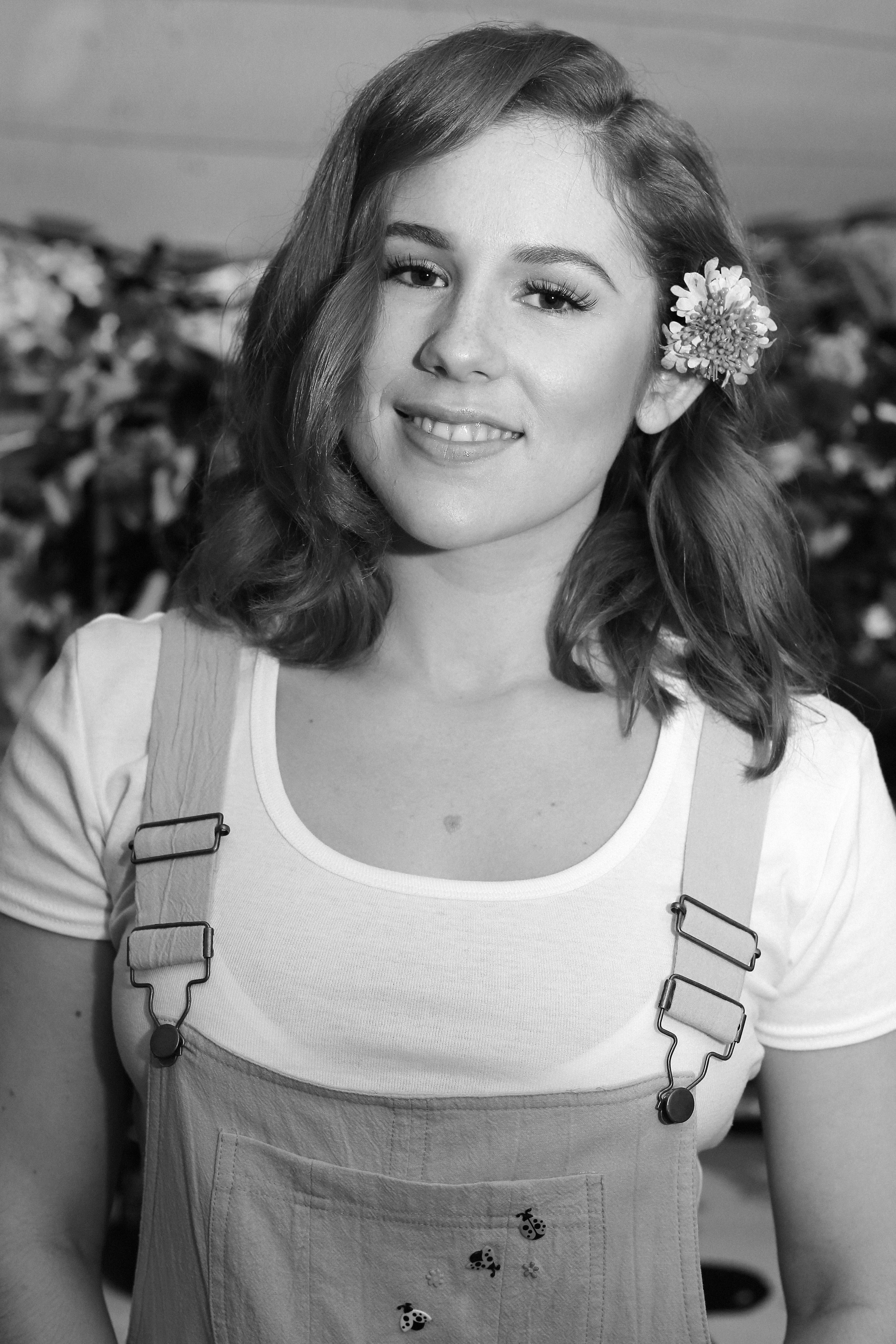
Katy B in 2013

On 1 October 2013, Katy announced that her second studio album would be titled Little Red. A single, "What Love Is Made Of", was released on 7 July 2013, charting at number 21 on the UK Singles Chart; although when the official Little Red track list was revealed on 13 December, "What Love Is Made Of" was no longer included. Lead single "5 AM" was released on 4 November 2013, charting at number 14 on the UK Singles Chart. "Crying for No Reason" was released on 10 February 2014, reaching the Top 5 of the singles chart. Little Red topped the UK Albums Chart on 19 February 2014. "Still" was released as the third and final single from the album.

On 18 February 2014, Katy's video for the ongoing 'Rinse Sessions x Metropolis' project was revealed, which included a back-to-back cover of Beyoncé's 'Drunk in Love' and Tinashe's "Vulnerable". In February, she also appeared on the BBC One show The Voice as Ricky Wilson's team mentor.

In March 2014, Katy took part in the recording of England's 2014 World Cup song, collaborating with fellow pop stars Melanie C, Eliza Doolittle, Emma Bunton, Conor Maynard, Kimberley Walsh and Pixie Lott on "Greatest Day", a track originally performed by the British band Take That. The track was produced by Gary Barlow and recorded at Sarm Studios in London, and also featured former footballers such as Gary Lineker, Michael Owen, Geoff Hurst, David Seaman, Peter Shilton, Glenn Hoddle and Dion Dublin on backing vocals. She performed at Birmingham Pride in May 2014.

=== 2015–2021: Honey and Peace and Offerings ===
In October 2015, Katy provided vocals, along with Tinie Tempah on "Turn the Music Louder (Rumble)", a re-worked version of British DJ KDA's track "Rumble". It topped the UK charts becoming Katy's first UK number one single.

In December 2015, Katy confirmed in a backstage interview at Capital FM's Jingle Bell Ball that her third studio album would be called Honey and would be released sometime in 2016. It was also confirmed that a track of the same name would feature. The album was released on 22 April 2016, containing 14 songs.

On 5 August 2021, Katy announced "Under My Skin" as the lead single from her EP, Peace and Offerings. Katy released Peace and Offerings on 5 November 2021.

=== 2022–present ===
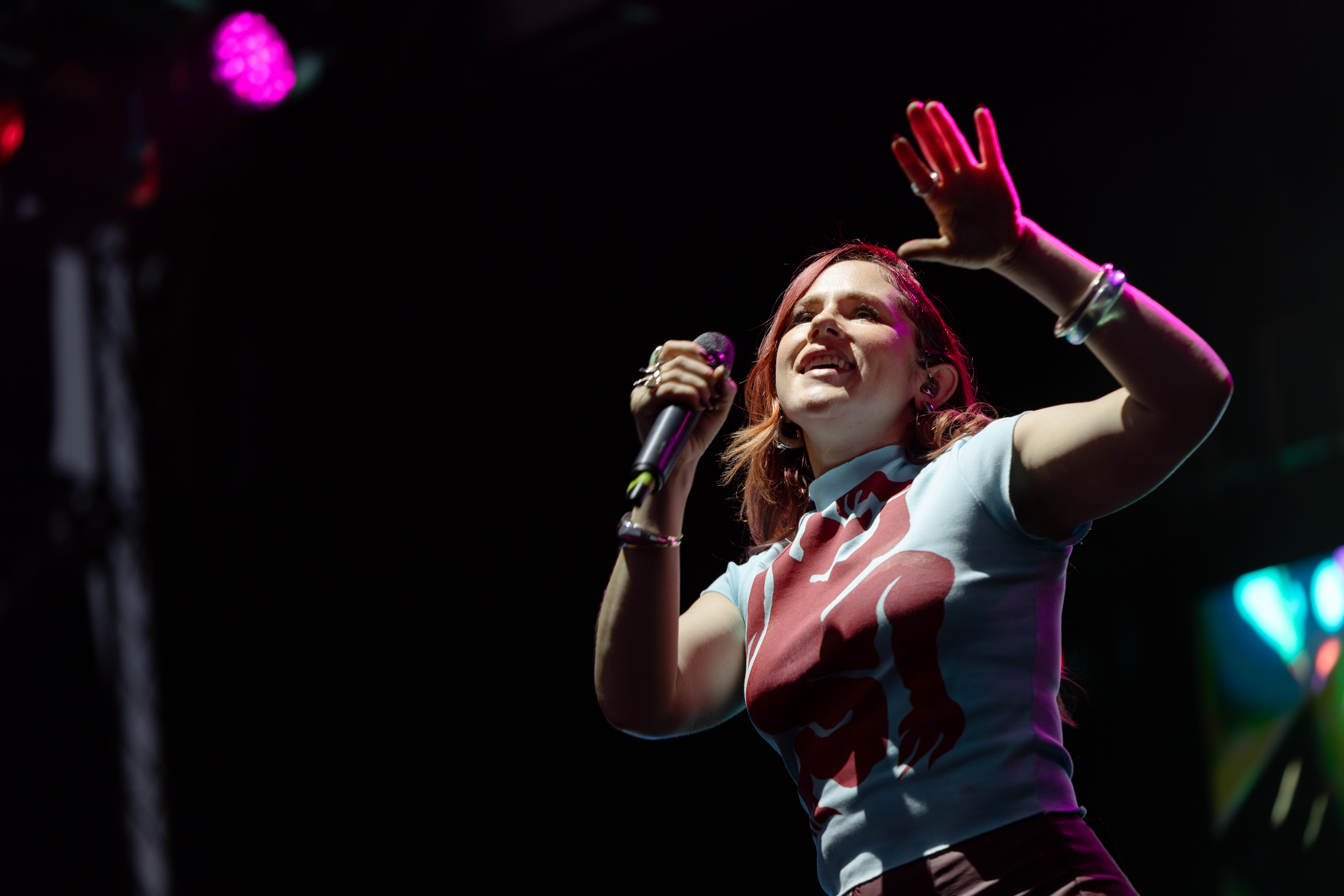
Katy B in June 2025

On 21 March 2023, Katy released the single "Paradise", in collaboration with Kings of the Rollers. The single debuted at number 93 on the UK Singles Downloads Chart ten days later.

Katy performed on season 12 of Love Island UK as a guest.

== Personal life ==
Katy is a Crystal Palace supporter.

== Political views ==
On 25 November 2019, along with 35 other musicians, Katy signed a letter endorsing the Labour Party leader Jeremy Corbyn in the 2019 UK general election with a call to end austerity.

== Discography ==
Studio albums

- On a Mission (2011)
- Little Red (2014)
- Honey (2016)

== Tours ==
- On a Mission Tour (2011)
- Little Red UK Tour (2014)
- Honey Tour (2016)

== Awards and nominations ==
Katy B has received five nominations at the MOBO Awards. She was nominated for Best Push Act at the MTV Europe Music Awards 2011. In 2011 she was also nominated for the Mercury Prize. In 2012 she won a NME Award for Dancefloor Anthem.

Year	Organisation	Award	Nominated work	Result
2011	Rober Awards Music Poll	Best Dance Anthem	"Easy Please Me"	Nominated
2011	Ivor Novello Awards	Best Contemporary Song	"Katy on a Mission"	Nominated
2011	Virgin Media Music Awards	Best Track	"Katy on a Mission"	Nominated
2011	Virgin Media Music Awards	Best Collaboration	Katy B and Ms. Dynamite	Nominated
2011	Virgin Media Music Awards	Best Newcomer	Herself	Nominated
2011	Virgin Media Music Awards	Best Female	Herself	Nominated
2011	Virgin Media Music Awards	Hottest Female	Herself	Nominated
2011	Virgin Media Music Awards	Best Album	On a Mission	Nominated
2011	Mercury Prize	Album of the Year	On a Mission	Nominated
2011	MOBO Awards	Best Album	On a Mission	Nominated
2011	MOBO Awards	Best UK Act	Herself	Nominated
2011	BT Digital Music Awards	Best Newcomer	Herself	Nominated
2011	BT Digital Music Awards	Best Female Artist	Herself	Nominated
2011	Q Awards	Breakthrough Artist	Herself	Nominated
2011	MTV Europe Music Awards 2011	Best Push Act	Herself	Nominated
2011	iTunes Rewind 2011	Best New Dance Artist	Herself	Nominated
2011	4Music Video Honours	Best Video	"Lights On"	Nominated
2012	NME Awards	Best Dancefloor Anthem	"Broken Record"	Won
2013	NME Awards	Best Dancefloor Anthem	"What You Came For" (ft. Mosca)	Nominated
2014	MOBO Awards	Best Album	Little Red	Nominated
2014	MOBO Awards	Best Female Act	Herself	Nominated
2014	Popjustice £20 Music Prize	Best British Pop Single	"Crying for No Reason"	Nominated
2014	UK Music Video Awards	Best Pop Video - UK	"Crying for No Reason"	Nominated
2014	4Music Video Honours	Best Girl	Herself	Nominated
2014	World Music Awards	World's Best Female Artist	Herself	Nominated
2014	World Music Awards	World's Best Live Act	Herself	Nominated
2014	World Music Awards	World's Best Entertainer of the Year	Herself	Nominated
2014	World Music Awards	World's Best Album	Little Red	Nominated
2014	World Music Awards	World's Best Song	"Crying for No Reason"	Nominated
2014	World Music Awards	World's Best Video	"Crying for No Reason"	Nominated
2014	World Music Awards	World's Best Video	"What Love Is Made Of"	Nominated
2014	World Music Awards	World's Best Song	"What Love Is Made Of"	Nominated
2015	Popjustice £20 Music Prize	Best British Pop Single	"Turn the Music Louder (Rumble)"	Nominated
2016	MOBO Awards	Best Female Act	Herself	Nominated
2016	Juno Awards	Dance Recording of the Year	"Save Me" (with Keys N Krates)	Won
2016	Webby Awards	Best Use of Video or Moving Image	"Save Me" (with Keys N Krates)	Nominated
