= Geeneus =

English DJ and radio executive

- Born: Gordon Warren; 20 June 1978 (age 47)
- Other names: Wizzbit; Gee
- Occupations: Music executive; DJ; record producer; talent manager
- Title: Director of Rinse FM (1994–2005; 2009–present) Director of Rinse Group (2000–present); Director of Static Media (2002–2006); Director of Dubplate Direct (2003–11); Director of Ammunition Events (2012–21); Director of Bad World Limited (2013–19) Director of Lot 43 (2015–20)
- Musical career
- Origin: Bow, London
- Genres: UK garage; grime; UK funky; house
- Labels: Rinse; Pay As U Go; Big Money; Dump Valve; Motion; Slimzos; Soulja; Keysound
- Formerly of: Pay As U Go; Centurions; Moonshine

Gordon Warren (born 20 June 1978), also known by the stage names Geeneus and Wizzbit, is a British radio and record label executive, talent manager, DJ and record producer from Bow, London, best known as the co-founder and managing director of the radio station Rinse FM and its associated labels. He also owns the grime and dubstep label Dump Valve and the house label Jelly Jams.

As a musician in his own right, Warren was a member of the UK garage crew Pay As U Go from 2000 to 2003 alongside pioneers of grime music such as Slimzee, Wiley and Flowdan, and co-produced their 2002 breakthrough single "Champagne Dance" which peaked at number 13 on the UK Singles Chart. He later produced various charting hits for singer Katy B in the 2010s, released via the Rinse label, including the UK top ten singles "Lights On", "Broken Record" and "Crying for No Reason".

== Career ==
=== 1993–2000: Pressure FM and Rinse's pirate radio beginnings ===
Warren has been a DJ from the age of fifteen. He had a show on the pirate radio station Pressure FM, through which he met fellow resident DJ Slimzee, although they were both kicked off due to "politics", thought to have included their young age and Slimzee's popularity. On the weekend of 1994's Notting Hill Carnival, unable to find rival stations willing to take on DJs their age, the pair began operating Rinse FM as a pirate station alongside friends Beanie and Fury, first broadcasting from the kitchen of a friend's brother's council flat in Ingram House, Bow. Warren and the station's other resident DJs initially played jungle music and later UK garage, which soon evolved into grime, and they carved a niche for themselves by platforming MCs more than other stations.

Warren's friends quickly coined the nickname Geeneus for him in reference to his proficiency in broadcasting technology. The location of transmissions constantly changed to evade officials from the Department of Trade and Industry who were routinely seizing their equipment, and included his grandmother's front room, Slimzee and Wiley's homes, a number of empty flats including one on the Crossways Estate which they exchanged with its resident for an aeroplane ticket to Ireland, and a derelict warehouse.

=== 2000–2007: Proto-grime, Pay As U Go and Wizzbit alias ===
In summer 2000, Warren joined the nine-man garage crew Pay As U Go as a founding member; it was formed by merging the members of multiple Rinse radio shows at the suggestion of Major Ace, after Plague Alero had begun to refer to his show as "the Pay As U Go show" in reference to a mobile network flaw at the time that allowed the public to make free calls from pay-as-you-go phones. Between the collective's DJs, they had three weekly radio shows: Warren would DJ on Monday nights, while Slimzee continued his Sunday afternoon show and DJ Target took over on Sunday nights, and the group's MCs would attend varying shows to ensure that they had the chance to perform with each DJ. Warren has stated that he believes the group's 2000 single "Know We", released six months after their formation and produced by Wiley, was the first grime song. Target has claimed that at this time, the group had "around three bookings a week each" and "were earning a few hundred [pounds] for each one". Warren was also active as a producer for the group at this time, and most notably co-produced their April 2002 single "Champagne Dance" alongside Target, which was released via Sony Music and peaked at number thirteen on the UK Singles Chart.

While in Pay As U Go, Warren began producing under the alias Wizzbit, and established his own record label, Dump Valve, primarily releasing instrumental music. Early releases on the label included Target's 2001 song "Earth Warrior"—the first twelve-inch single to be released on the label—and Warren's grime cult classic "Jam Hot". Although Pay As U Go had recorded and pitched a debut album to major labels, the group ultimately disbanded by the end of 2003, driven by numerous factors: Wiley had vetoed a £500,000 multi-album recording contract for the group on the grounds that he believed it would be a conflict of interest to sign to the same label as his other crew Roll Deep; a shooting at a So Solid Crew event at the London Astoria had resulted in major labels exercising caution in working with garage acts; and each of the crew's members had been working on solo ventures which were gaining momentum. Warren established a Rinse label in 2003 as an offshoot of the radio station, which increased its output in the years after he appointed FWD>> founder Sarah 'Soulja' Lockhart as station manager in 2004. Warren continued to sign music to Dump Valve, which earned a reputation for releasing more leftfield grime, including DJ Wonder's 2004 song "What", Wiley's 2006 song "Avenger", and Wonder's debut album Welcome to Wonderland (2006), which included an appearance from Kano. He produced the song "Nothing About Me" on Wiley's third studio album Playtime Is Over (2007).

=== 2007–2014: Rinse brand expansion, Volumes: One and chart success with Katy B ===
In 2007, Rinse launched a titular series of mix CDs, with its inaugural edition mixed by Warren. Around the same time, he began producing UK funky under the alias Moonshine, which occasionally involved DJ Zinc, and remixed Benga and Coki's "Night". Rinse FM received a legal community FM broadcast license in June 2010 following a three-year campaign.

After being introduced to singer Katy B around 2007, Warren featured her on the song "As I" on his December 2008 debut long-player, Volumes: One; the song was quickly considered a UK funky classic, and was also remixed by Skepta. Warren and Katy B intended to curate a compilation featuring her vocals over productions from various Rinse DJ/producers; this record ultimately evolved into her debut album, On a Mission (2011), which featured eight productions from Warren and peaked at number two on the UK Albums Chart. Both of the singles Warren produced, "Lights On" (featuring Ms. Dynamite) and "Broken Record", entered the UK Singles Chart top ten, and he was also a songwriter on her Ivor Novello Award-nominated breakthrough single "Katy on a Mission". In 2011, the Evening Standard named Warren among 'London's 1000 most influential people' in pop and rock. In a 2012 interview with The Guardian, Katy claimed "I always think of Katy B as a band. There's me and Geeneus, and it was Rinse's idea."

=== 2014–present: Station acquisitions and talent management ===
Warren has since continued to frequently collaborate with Katy B, and produced extensively for her subsequent albums Little Red (2014), which topped the UK Albums Chart, and Honey (2016). Rinse launched a regional sister station, Rinse France, in 2014, strategically based in Paris due to its proximity to London, and Warren uploaded numerous unreleased Wizzbit songs to SoundCloud in winter of the same year. In March 2015, Warren released a double single, "ELE" / "Red Velvet", as his first original music in seven years, the first of which was described as a house song that "draws on grime's essence". In 2018, Rinse launched the sister label Bad Music as a separate entity to release music by singer-songwriters, who have included Sinead Harnett, Sasha Keable and James Smith. Warren co-produced Kali Uchis's 2022 house-baile funk fusion single "No Hay Ley", of which a remix featuring Rauw Alejandro was later released in 2024.

In 2023, the Rinse Group acquired and relaunched the radio stations Kool FM, an early inspiration to Warren known for its jungle and drum and bass offerings, and SWU.FM, a regional Bristol station. A Kool record label was also launched. Warren also represents talent under Rinse's management arm, which has included Vigro Deep and Katy B.

== Personal life ==
Warren grew up on a council house and is from a working class background; he has previously claimed that most of his peers have been to jail, citing music as a positive influence in his life. He found himself in many dangerous situations during Rinse FM's time as a pirate radio station, and reportedly once "had a sword held to his throat in a studio in Nesbitt House in Hackney". He was a signatory of a Guardian open letter from musicians endorsing Jeremy Corbyn's Labour Party in the 2019 United Kingdom general election.

== Legacy ==
Warren has been described by Dan Hancox as "instrumental from day one" of grime music and someone who "transform[ed] British music" and by Time Out as "a legend of the scene and a tastemaker responsible for one of the most important institutions in British dance music" [in Rinse FM]. He is also credited with scouting and platforming the next generation of radio personalities through Rinse including Maya Jama, Julie Adenuga and Eliza Rose.

== Discography ==
=== Compilations ===
- Volumes: One (2008)

=== Singles ===
==== As lead artist ====
Year	Title	Album
2001	"Wickedest Ting" (with Wiley featuring Flowdan and Breeze)	Non-album single
2001	"Anywhere" (featuring God's Gift, Major Ace and Plague)	Non-album single
2001	"Shocka"	Non-album single
2002	"Da Journey" / "4 Beat"	Non-album single
2002	"Thunder"	Non-album single
2003	"Detroit"	Non-album single
2003	"Da Stomp Riddem" / "Jazzstyle" (as Geeneus vs. Wizzbit)	Non-album single
2003	"Jam Hot" (as Wizzbit)	Non-album single
2003	"Aquarius" (as Wizzbit)	Non-album single
2003	"Breakdown" / "Darkest One" (as Wizzbit)	Non-album single
2003	"Popadomz (Gangster)" (as Wizzbit featuring Riko)	Non-album single
2004	"Jamnite" / "Emerald City" (as Geeneus vs. Wizzbit)	Non-album single
2004	"Quantum Leap" / "Oldskool" (as Wizzbit)	Non-album single
2005	"Grand Theft Auto" / "Showtime" (as Wizzbit)	Non-album single
2006	"Darkboy"	Non-album single
2007	"Old Skool 2" / "Old Skool What"	Non-album single
2008	"Knife & Gun" (featuring Riko, Wiley and Breeze)	Non-album single
2015	"ELE" / "Red Velvet"	Non-album single
2020	"Midnight" (with DJ Target as Centurions)	Non-album single
2020	"Log Off" (vs. Slimzee)	Non-album single
2020	"Ja Know"	Non-album single
2020	"Slow" (as Wizzbit)	Non-album single
2020	"Rukus"	Non-album single
