= Rinse FM =

London-based radio station

- London; United Kingdom
- Frequencies: FM: 106.8 MHz; DAB: 9A

Programming
- Format: Music radio, UK-centric urban dance music

Ownership
- Owner: Rinse FM Ltd

History
- First air date: September 1994 (pirate station); 7 February 2011 (community radio licence)
- Former frequencies: 100.3 and 100.4 MHz (as a pirate)

Links
- Webcast: Rinse Player Stream
- Website: rinse.fm

Rinse FM is a London-based community radio station, licensed for "young people living and/or working within the central, east and south London areas". It plays garage, grime, dubstep, house, jungle, UK funky and other dance music genres popular in the United Kingdom.

The station was founded in 1994 and operated as a pirate radio station until it was awarded a broadcast licence in June 2010. Rinse FM has been described as London's biggest pirate radio station. It provided first exposure to grime artists Dizzee Rascal and Wiley and later provided a home for dubstep DJs such as Skream, Kode9, and DJ Oneman. DJ Geeneus is the station's head.

== History ==
=== Early years ===
Founded by Geeneus and Slimzee, Rinse FM's first broadcast was in September 1994. For a three-year period in the early days of the station the Rinse studio was hosted in Slimzee's house. In its early years the station mainly played jungle with a particular focus on MCs, a direction which set Rinse apart from competing stations. At the time the station broadcast from secret, makeshift locations such as kitchens and bedrooms belonging to friends and DJs, constantly moving between these locations to avoid getting shut down by authorities. Its first broadcast was made from Ingram House in Tower Hamlets, London. This continued to a lesser extent throughout the 16 years during which Rinse was a pirate radio station.

Kool FM was the leading pirate radio station within the jungle scene, and it wasn't until Rinse changed its focus to the emerging garage scene around 1998–1999 that it gained a substantial following, thanks to the darker sound that it brought from its jungle days. Into the early 2000s, the station became critical for emergence and development of the genres grime and dubstep, and was managed during this time by DJ Uncle Dugs. Rinse broadcast on the frequency of 100.3/100.4FM for the majority of its unlicensed years on air.

Radio 1 DJ John Peel recommended the station in 2004, stating that:

When I'm in London I listen to the pirates as much as I can. There's a station I like called Rinse FM, which is somewhere in the area banded by [i.e. between the frequencies of] Kiss FM and Classic FM.

Sarah "Soulja" Lockhart joined Rinse as their station manager in 2004 and launched their weekly party nights FWD>.

In April 2005 Ofcom disconnected a Rinse FM radio transmitter and Dean Fullman, known on air as Slimzee, received an ASBO, believed to be the first of its kind, banning him from every rooftop in the borough of Tower Hamlets.

=== Legal licence ===
As of August 2007 the station was seeking a legal FM licence. Rinse FM created a petition which received hundreds of supporters within less than a week, including some from countries other than the UK. At the time, the station's owner DJ Geeneus said: "We don't want to be legal to play stupid adverts and make loads of money from advertising. We want to be legal to say: look at our scene, look at what we're doing. We're a business, we're not criminals. We're supplying something that no one else is supplying, and we're professional."

Rinse FM was awarded a community FM broadcast licence by Ofcom in June 2010 for frequency 106.8 FM. It commenced broadcasting legally on 7 February 2011. The station is presently managed by Sarah Lockhart.

As part of its community broadcasting remit, Rinse FM is engaged in training young people in broadcasting skills who are considered marginalised, even working with children who are in Pupil Referral Units. These are units for persistent truants and people with special educational needs.

In October 2015, it joined the London Trial DAB MUX.

=== DJs and presenters ===
DJs and presenters to have appeared on Rinse include:

- Alexander Nut
- Anti Social (Jay 5ive, Silkie, Kromestar)
- Artwork
- Benga
- Ben UFO
- Boy Better Know
- Caspa
- Cerrone
- dBridge
- DJ Chef
- DJ Distance
- Fabio & Grooverider
- DJ Flight
- DJ Geeneus
- DJ Hatcha
- DJ Randall
- DJ Ron
- DJ Slimzee
- DJ Spoony
- DJ Target
- DJ Zinc
- Dizzee Rascal
- Elijah And Skilliam (Butterz)
- Funk Butcher
- Hessle Audio
- Icicle
- Ikonika
- Jake Demie
- Jyoty
- Josey Rebelle
- Kismet
- Kode9
- Loefah
- Logan Sama
- Marcus Nasty
- Maya Jama
- Mark Radford
- Newham Generals
- N Type
- Norwood Soul Patrol
- Oneman
- Paleface
- Pangaea
- Pay As U Go
- Pearson Sound
- Plastician
- P Money
- Roska
- Royal-T
- Scratcha DVA
- Skepta
- Skream
- SK Vibemaker
- Supa D
- Shax
- Spyro
- The Clairvoyants – Shax, SBR, Jason H
- The Menendez Brothers
- Stamina MC
- Tom Ravenscroft
- Uncle Dugs
- Wiley
- Youngsta

== Rinse Recordings ==
The station first released music under the Rinse Recordings imprint in 2003. Currently, the label releases albums and singles from a roster of signed artists as well as mix CDs from DJs associated with the station. The label first saw chart success when Katy B released "Katy on a Mission" on the label in 2010.

Currently signed acts include P Money, Katy B, Novelist, Roska and Royal-T. DJs who have released mix albums for Rinse Recordings include Skream, Skepta, Kode9 and Elijah and Skilliam. With the release of the 23rd mix CD (mixed by Richy Ahmed), Rinse has stated that it broadens the concept to include non-residents of the station. The label went on to release Katy B's chart-topping album Little Red and Route 94's chart-topping single "My Love" in 2014.

=== Discography ===
==== Mix/compilation albums ====
- Rinse 01 – Geeneus (2007)
- Rinse 02 – Skream (2007)
- Rinse 03 – Supa D (2008)
- Rinse 04 – Skepta (2008)
- Rinse 05 – Paleface (2008)
- Rinse 06 – Plastician (2008)
- Rinse 07 – Spyro (2009)
- Rinse 08 – Alexander Nut (2009)
- Rinse 09 – N Type (2009)
- Rinse 10 – Marcus Nasty (2009)
- Rinse 11 – Oneman (2010)
- Rinse 12 – Kismet (2010)
- Rinse 13 – no release
- Rinse 14 – Youngsta (2011)
- Rinse 15 – Roska (2011)
- Rinse 16 – Ben UFO (2011)
- Rinse 17 – Elijah And Skilliam (2011)
- Rinse 18 – Mark Radford (2012)
- Rinse 19 – Icicle (2012)
- Rinse 20 – Uncle Dugs (2012)
- Rinse 21 – T.Williams (2012)
- Rinse 22 – Kode9 (2013)
- Rinse 23 – Richy Ahmed (2013)
- Various – "Dubstep Drama – OST" (2007)
- Various – "I Love Dubstep" (2008)
- Various – "I Love Funky" (2010)
- Various – "I Love Grime" (2012)

==== Artists singles/albums ====
- Geeneus – "Volumes 1" (2008)
- Roska – "Roska" (2010) / "Roska 2" (2012)
- Katy B – "On a Mission" / "Lights On" (2010)
- Royal-T – "Presents Royal-T" (2012)
- Faze Miyake – Faze Miyake (2015)

== Internet radio ==
Rinse began streaming its shows online in 2006. All shows are available both on the website and SoundCloud.

== Rinse France ==
In February 2014, Rinse launched Rinse France based in Paris.

== Kool FM ==
In January 2023, Rinse announced that it was taking over management of London drum and bass station Kool FM.

== SWU FM ==
In April 2023, Rinse announced that it was relaunching the previously closed Bristol-based radio station, SWU FM.

== Legacy ==
The station has been described as London's biggest pirate radio station and "without doubt the world's leading grime station." Writing for FACT magazine in 2007, Simon Hampson stated: "Without Rinse, Grime and Dubstep would be very different: indeed, it's fair to say that they might not even exist at all."

Rinse celebrated its 20th birthday in 2014.
