= Skream discography =

Oliver Dene Jones, known as Skream, is an English electronic music producer based in Croydon.

== Solo ==
=== Studio albums ===
List of studio albums, with selected chart positions, and certifications
Title	Album details	Peak chart positions		Certifications
Title	Album details	UK	UK Dance	Certifications
Skream!	Released: 30 October 2006; Label: Tempa	—	34	
Outside the Box	Released: 9 August 2010; Label: Tempa	43	4	
The Freeizm Album	Released: 25 December 2010; Label: Self-released	—	—	
Unreleased Classics. Vol 1. 2002-2003	Released: 20 March 2020; Label: Self-released	—	—	
Unreleased Classics. Vol 2. 2004-2006	Released: 30 April 2020; Label: Self-released	—	—	
Unreleased Classics. Vol 3.	Released: 5 February 2021; Label: Self-released	—	—	
"—" denotes a recording that did not chart.

=== Extended plays ===
Title	Album details	Peak chart positions	Certifications
Title	Album details	UK Dance	Certifications
The Judgement (with Benga)	Released: 2003; Label: Big Apple Records	—	
Hydro / Elektro (with Benga)	Released: 2004; Label: Big Apple Records	—	
The Southside EP 1	Released: 2006	—	
The Southside EP 2	Released: 2006	—	
Skreamizm, Vol. 1	Released: 13 February 2006; Label: Tempa	—	
Skreamizm, Vol. 2	Released: 17 July 2006; Label: Tempa	—	
Acid People	Released: 2007	—	
Skreamizm, Vol. 3	Released: 30 April 2007; Label: Tempa	—	
Skreamizm, Vol. 4	Released: 21 January 2008; Label: Tempa	35	
Skreamizm, Vol. 5	Released: 1 December 2008; Label: Tempa	21	
Skream EP	Released: 13 June 2011; Label: Disfigured Dubz	—	
Skreamizm, Vol. 6	Released: 12 December 2011; Label: Tempa	15	
Skreamizm, Vol. 7	Released: 21 December 2012; Label: Tempa	32	
Chronicles EP (with Billy Turner)	Released: 15 December 2017; Label: Of Unsound Mind	—	
Chesters Groove EP	Released: 21 May 2021; Label: IFEEL	—	
Steel City Dance Discs Volume 23	Released: 22 September 2021; Label: Steel City Dance Discs	—	
The Attention Deficit EP	Released: 15 July 2022; Label: Rockstar Records	—	
Skreamizm, Vol. 8	Released: 15 September 2023; Label: Skreamizm	—	

=== Singles ===
- "Midnight Request Line" / "I" (2005)
- "28g" / "Fearless" (with Loefah) (2005)
- "Bahl Fwd" / "Temptation" (Skream / Distance) (2006)
- "Tapped" / "Dutch Flowerz" (2006)
- "Travels" / "Wise Men" (with Distance) (2006)
- "Sub Island" / "Pass The Red Stripe" (2007)
- "Retro" / "Wake Up" (with Hijak) (2007)
- "Hedd Banger" / "Percression" (2008)
- "The Shinein" (2009)
- "Burning Up" (2009)
- "Just Being Me" / "Murdera" (2009)
- "Repercussions of a Razor Blade" / "A New Dawn" (2010)
- "No Future (Skreamix)" / "Minimalistix" (Instra:mental / Skream) (2010)
- "Listenin' to the Records on My Wall" / "Give You Everything (featuring Freckles)" (2010)
- "Shot Yourself in the Foot Again" (with Example) (2011) – UK: #82, Australia: #75
- "Where You Should Be" (featuring Sam Frank) (2011)
- "Exothermic Reaction" / "Future Funkizm" (2011)
- "Anticipate" (featuring Sam Frank) (2011) – UK: #74
- "Gritty" / "Phatty Drummer" (2011)
- "Sweetz – 2005 Flex / Angry World (2011)
- "Rollercoaster" (featuring Sam Frank) (2013)
- "Kingpin" (with Friction) (featuring Scrufizzer, P Money & Riko Dan) (2013)
- "Diam" / "Mood To Funk" (2013)
- "Sticky" (2013)
- "Kreepin" (2013)
- "Bang That" (2014)
- "Still Lemonade" (2015)
- "This Love / Settled (2016)
- "Room 959" (with Jonjo) (2016)
- "You Know, Right!? / Minor Smooth" (2016)
- "Face Down in the Water / Let It Go / Motions (2017)
- "Old Yella" (with Dennis Ferrer) (2018)
- "Poison" (2018)
- "Ain't It Cold" (2018)
- "This Is It / 5am" (with Melody's Enemy) (2019)
- "Otto's Chant" (with Michael Bibi) (2019)
- "Song For Olivia" (2019)
- "Pussy Pop" (2019)
- "Ectogazm" (2019)
- "DUNNN / Tramadollied" (2020)
- "EMF" (with Tom Demac) (2020)
- "LOL OK" (with Must Die! and Akeos) (2021)
- "Shinogi" (2021)
- "Trees" (2021)
- "Instakord" (2021)
- "So Sorry" (with Rudimental) (2021)
- "Space Ghetto" (2021)
- " 'Sad Days' " (2021)
- "The Attention Deficit Track" (with Jackmaster) (2021)
- "Summoned" (2023)
- "Duality" (2023)
- "Good Things Come to Those Who Wait" (with Benga) (2025)
- "Midnight Control" (featuring Emily Makis) (with Benga) (2025)

=== Compilations ===
- Various Artists – Rinse 02 (Mixed by Skream) (2007)
- Various Artists – Watch the Ride (Mixed by Skream) (2008)

=== Freebies ===
- Freeizm Vol. 1 (2010)
- Freeizm Vol. 2 (2010)
- Freeizm Vol. 3 (2010)
- The Freeizm Album (2010)
- Freeizm History (2011)
- 100K Freeizm (2012)

=== Production credits ===
Year	Title	Artist	Album (Release)
2011	"Badness"	Zed Bias	Biasonic Hotsauce: Birth of the Nanocloud
2011	"Under the Influence"	Example	Playing in the Shadows
2012	"First of My Kind"	Miles Kane	First of My Kind
2012	"Are You Sitting Comfortably?"	Example	The Evolution of Man

=== Remixes ===
Remix credit
Year	Song	Artist
2004	"Indian Dub" (Skream's 04 remix)	Loefah
2005	"Punisher" (Skream's Heavy Duty remix)	Pinch
2006	"Ancient Memories"	Digital Mystikz
2006	"The Rise" (Skream dubplate)	Omen
2006	"Badman"	Qualifide
2007	"Flim"	DJ Zinc
2007	"Roots Dyed Dark"	Marc Ashken
2007	"Size 3"	Marc Ashken
2007	"It's Not Over Yet"	Klaxons
2007	"Poison Dart"	The Bug
2007	"Saw Something" (Skreamix)	Dave Gahan
2007	"Oi Berlin, This Is London" (Oi This Doesn't Sound Like Skream remix)	David E. Sugar
2007	"Splurt"	Landslide vs Slaughtermob
2007	"Plodder"	MRK 1
2008	"Reminissin'" (Skream's 'Time Traveller' Refix)	Geiom
2008	"Control" (Skreamix)	12th Planet
2009	"Night Vision" (Skream's 'So Nasty' version)	Distance
2009	"I Can Dream" (Skreamix)	Skunk Anansie
2009	"In for the Kill" (Skream's Let's Get Ravey remix)	La Roux
2009	"In for the Kill" (That Doesn't Sound Like Skream's remix)	La Roux
2009	"Pearls Dream"(Skream's Pour Another Glass of Champers remix)	Bat For Lashes
2009	"Rebel"	Toddla T (featuring Benjamin Zephaniah and Joe Goddard)
2009	"Show Me" (Skreamix)	Von D (featuring Lady Phe Phe)
2009	"Night by Night"	Chromeo
2009	"Assumptions"	Mackjiggah
2009	"Rumble Inna Station"	Uzul
2009	"Upper Clapton Dance"(Skreamix)	Professor Green (featuring Chynaman & Cores)
2009	"No Future" (Skreamix)	Instra:mental
2010	"Wile Out"	DJ Zinc (featuring Ms. Dynamite)
2010	"Strobe" (Skream's Eyes Down Tribal mix)	deadmau5
2010	"Riot Music"	Donae'o
2010	"Lights On"	Katy B (featuring Ms. Dynamite)
2010	"Left The Room"	P Money
2010	"Cut Like a Buffalo" (Skreamix)	The Dead Weather
2010	"Show Me Love"	Robin S.
2011	"Pow 2011"(Skream Murky mix)	Lethal Bizzle
2011	"I Know" (Skream's Not So Ravey remix)	David Lynch
2011	"Getting Nowhere"	Magnetic Man (featuring John Legend)
2011	"I <3 U So" (Skream's Made Zdar Feel Like He Was 20 Again remix)	Cassius
2011	"Rearrange"	Miles Kane
2011	"This Momentary"	Delphic
2011	"Natural Disaster"	Example vs. Laidback Luke
2011	"Check My Swagga Out"	Donae'o
2012	"Somebody To Love"	Rusko
2012	"Distance"	Kelis
2013	"Lies"	Burns
2013	"Jah No Partial"	Major Lazer (featuring Flux Pavilion)
2013	"Need U (100%)" (Skreamix)	Duke Dumont (featuring A*M*E)
2013	"Hell Could Freeze"	Rudimental (featuring Angel Haze)
2013	"Infinity" (Skream's 99 remix)	Infinity Ink
2014	"This Charming Man" (Skream's Heart Wrenching Ballads remix)	The Smiths
2014	"Right Here"	Jess Glynne
2014	"Perfect Picture"	Ali Love
2014	"Trouble"	Curses & DKDS (featuring SYF)
2015	"Sometimes I Feel So Deserted"	The Chemical Brothers
2015	"Free Falling"	Tiefschwarz (featuring Khan)
2016	"Euphoria"	Boys Noize (featuring Remmy Banks)
2016	"Send Them Off!"	Bastille
2016	"Friday Night Dancing"	Alan Fitzpatrick
2017	"The Basement Shit"	Riva Starr
2017	"Open Up"	Leftfield (featuring John Lydon)
2017	"Paradise"	Back Talk (featuring Idris Elba)
2018	"Bugged Out"	CamelPhat & Audio Bullys
2018	"Old Times"	Amtrac (featuring Anabel Englund)
2018	"Capricorn"	Elderbrook
2019	"Deadline"	Josh Gregg
2019	"Electric Acid Tater Tots"	Elliot Adamson
2019	"Colourblind"	Ki Creighton (featuring Jem Cooke)
2019	"Be Someone"	CamelPhat (featuring Jake Bugg)
2019	"Do Not Freak" (Skream & Scuba Remix)	Locked Grove
2019	"Complicated"	Andres Campo
2020	"Never Let You Go"	Georgia
2020	"Drive"	DJ Fresh
2020	"Beautiful Faces"	Declan McKenna
2020	"Connectivity"	See Thru Hands
2020	"Flesh & Blood" (Skream Lockdown Autonomic Remix)	Franc Moody
2020	"Dad's Van"	Lila Drew
2020	"Looking for Me"	Paul Woolford & Diplo (featuring Kareen Lomax)
2020	"Know Me"	Bronson (featuring Gallant)
2020	"Sad Songs"	Route 94 (featuring L Devine)
2020	"In My Element"	The Clause
2021	"Zero"	Claptone
2021	"Neon Cheap"	Methyl Ethel
2021	"Natural"	Rich NxT (featuring Shyam P)
2021	"Out of Reality"	Lauren Flax (featuring Alejandra de la Deheza)
2021	"El Nido"	Trance Wax
2022	"Gaia"	LORAN & Daniel Orpi
2022	"Beachin'"	Piri & Tommy
2022	"Tuk Tuk" (Jackmaster & Skream Remix)	Solomun (featuring ÄTNA)
2022	"Pizza Boy"	Everything Everything
2023	"Moving All Around (Jumpin') [Skream's This Is How We Do It Down South Remix]	Schak (feat. Kim English)

== With Magnetic Man ==
=== Albums ===
- Magnetic Man (2010)

=== EPs ===
- The Cyberman EP (2009)

=== Singles ===
- "I Need Air" featuring Angela Hunte (2010)
- "Perfect Stranger" featuring Katy B (2010)
- "Getting Nowhere" featuring John Legend (2011)
- "Anthemic" featuring P Money (2011)
