= Flux Pavilion discography =

This is the discography of British electronic musician Flux Pavilion.

== Studio albums ==
- Tesla (18 September 2015)
- .wav (21 January 2021)

== Extended plays ==
Title	Release details
Boom (with Datsik and Excision)	Released: 15 June 2009
Nuke 'Em (with Datsik, Tom Encore and Redline)	Released: 21 April 2009
Lines in Wax	Released: 11 October 2010
Blow the Roof	Released: 28 January 2013
Freeway	Released: 11 November 2013
Party Drink Smoke (with Doctor P)	Released 29 April 2016
Fluxiverse	Released 16 November 2023

== Compilations ==
- Circus One (presented by Doctor P & Flux Pavilion)
- Grand Central

== Singles ==
Title	Year	Peak chart positions						Album
Title	Year	UK	UK Dance	AUS	CAN	US	US Dance	Album
"I Can't Stop"	2010	115	12	—	68	105	12	Lines in Wax
"Bass Cannon"	2011	56	9	—	—	—	—	Circus One
"Frozen" [as Joshua Steele] (with The Freestylers)	2011	—	—	—	—	—	—	The Coming Storm
"Jump Back" (with SKisM featuring Foreign Beggars)	2011	—	—	—	—	—	—	Non-album singles
"Superbad" (with Doctor P)	2011	61	7	—	—	—	—	Non-album singles
"Daydreamer" (featuring Example)	2012	39	9	—	—	—	—	Non-album singles
"Jah No Partial" (with Major Lazer)	2012	—	—	—	—	—	30	Free the Universe
"Do or Die" (featuring Childish Gambino)	2013	—	—	48	—	—	29	Blow the Roof
"Gold Teeth" (with dan le sac vs Scroobius Pip)	2013	—	—	—	—	—	—	Repent Replenish Repeat
"Steve French" (featuring Steve Aoki)	2013	—	—	—	—	—	—	Freeway
"International Anthem" (featuring Doctor)	2015	—	—	—	—	—	—	Tesla
"Who Wants to Rock" (featuring Riff Raff)	2015	—	—	—	—	—	—	Tesla
"Feels Good" (featuring Tom Cane)	2015	—	—	—	—	—	—	Tesla
"Emotional" (with Matthew Koma)	2015	—	—	—	—	—	—	Tesla
"Feel Your Love" (with NGHTMRE featuring Jamie Lewis)	2016	—	—	—	—	—	—	Non-album singles
"Cannonball" (with Snails)	2016	—	—	—	—	—	—	Non-album singles
"Pull the Trigger" / "Cut Me Out" (featuring Cammie Robinson / Turin Brakes)	2017	—	—	—	—	—	—	Non-album singles
"Stain" / "Saxophone Doom" (featuring Two-9 / Jace and Curtis Williams)	2017	—	—	—	—	—	—	Non-album singles
"Call To Arms" (with Meaux Green)	2018	—	—	—	—	—	—	Non-album singles
"Symphony" (featuring Layna)	2018	—	—	—	—	—	—	Earwax and .wav
"Party Starter" (with Eliminate)	2018	—	—	—	—	—	—	Non-album singles
"Saviour" (featuring Craymak and Tasha Baxter)	2019	—	—	—	—	—	—	Non-album singles
"Lion's Cage" (featuring Nevve)	2019	—	—	—	—	—	—	.wav
"Room to Fall" (with Marshmello featuring Elohim)	2019	—	—	—	—	—	19	Joytime III
"Somebody Else" (featuring Glnna)	2019	—	—	—	—	—	—	.wav
"Surrender" (featuring Next to Neon and A:M)	2019	—	—	—	—	—	—	Non-album single
"20:25" (with What So Not featuring The Chain Gang of 1974)	2019	—	—	—	—	—	—	.wav
"I Will Stay" (featuring Turin Brakes)	2019	—	—	—	—	—	—	.wav
"Endless Fantasy" (featuring Eli-Rose Sanford)	2019	—	—	—	—	—	—	.wav
"Survive" (with Feed Me featuring Meesh)	2020	—	—	—	—	—	—	.wav
"Sink Your Teeth In" (featuring Drowsy)	2020	—	—	—	—	—	—	.wav
"You & I" (featuring Kata Kozma)	2020	—	—	—	—	—	—	.wav
"I Believe" (featuring Asha)	2020	—	—	—	—	—	—	.wav
"Fall To Me" (with Chime featuring spaceKDET)	2021	—	—	—	—	—	—	.wav
"Be Ok" (with Ookay and Elohim)	2021	—	—	—	—	—	—	Non-album singles
"Dreams" (with Anamanaguchi)	2021	—	—	—	—	—	—	Non-album singles
"Lore"	2022	—	—	—	—	—	—	Non-album singles
"(Never Gonna) Be Alone"	2022	—	—	—	—	—	—	Non-album singles
"I'm Delighted" (with Cookie Monsta and Koven)	2022	—	—	—	—	—	—	Non-album singles
"Technicolour Psychic Vision"	2022	—	—	—	—	—	—	Non-album singles
"Paradise"	2023	—	—	—	—	—	—	Fluxiverse Vol. 1
"Fracture" (with Apashe featuring Joey Valence & Brae)	2023	—	—	—	—	—	—	Antagonist
"Where You At" (with Conrank)	2023	—	—	—	—	—	—	Fluxiverse Vol. 1
"Heavy Metal" (with PAV4N)	2023	—	—	—	—	—	—	Fluxiverse Vol. 1
"Dawn" (with Eliminate featuring Meesh)	2024	—	—	—	—	—	—	Get Off the Internet
"On Forever" (with Excision featuring Saint Raymond)	2024	—	—	—	—	—	—	Non-album singles
"Waves" (with Zeds Dead and DeathbyRomy)	2024	—	—	—	—	—	—	Non-album singles
"On Repeat" (with Wooli and Cammie Robinson)	2024	—	—	—	—	—	—	Fluxiverse Vol. 2
"Better Off"	2024	—	—	—	—	—	—	Non-album singles
"Tick Tock" (with Cyclops featuring Illaman)	2024	—	—	—	—	—	—	Fluxiverse Vol. 2
"WDGAF" (with Doctor P)	2025	—	—	—	—	—	—	Doctor P & Flux Pavilion
"Fluffy Cowboy" (with Doctor P)	2025	—	—	—	—	—	—	Doctor P & Flux Pavilion
"Feel Good Ltd" (with Doctor P)	2025	—	—	—	—	—	—	Doctor P & Flux Pavilion
"Turbo Time" (with Doctor P)	2025	—	—	—	—	—	—	Doctor P & Flux Pavilion
"Wasabi" (with Doctor P)	2025	—	—	—	—	—	—	Doctor P & Flux Pavilion
"Rubber Dub" (with Doctor P)	2025	—	—	—	—	—	—	Doctor P & Flux Pavilion
"I Love It" (with Doctor P)	2025	—	—	—	—	—	—	Doctor P & Flux Pavilion
"Stay with the Tempo" (with Habstrakt)	2025	—	—	—	—	—	—	Non-album singles
"I Won't Stop"	2025	—	—	—	—	—	—	Non-album singles
"2Fast2Stop"	2025	—	—	—	—	—	—	Non-album singles
"Another Level" (with Feed Me and Kill the Noise)	2026	—	—	—	—	—	—	Non-album singles
"Goddess" (with Adventure Club and Jaira Burns)	2026	—	—	—	—	—	—	Calling All Heroes II
"The Last Breakfast" (with Doctor P)	2026	—	—	—	—	—	—	Doctor P & Flux Pavilion (Ultimate Edition)
"U Want Me"	2026	—	—	—	—	—	—	TBA
"Move Your Body" (with Liquid Stranger and Ahee)	2026	—	—	—	—	—	—	TBA
"Cracks Begin to Show" (with Freestylers and Belle Humble)	2026	—	—	—	—	—	—	Non-album singles
"—" denotes a single that did not chart or was not released.

== As featured artist ==
Single	Year
"Jah No Partial" (Major Lazer featuring Flux Pavilion)	2013
"Get Me Outta Here" (Steve Aoki featuring Flux Pavilion)	2014
"Rhythm Bomb" (The Prodigy featuring Flux Pavilion)	2015
"Catch Me" (Yellow Claw with Flux Pavilion featuring Naaz)	2015
"Dynamite" (Outrun featuring Flux Pavilion)	2017
"Fly Away" (Engine Earz-Experiment featuring Flux Pavilion)	2017
"Waved" (Foreign Beggars featuring Flux Pavilion, OG Maco and Black Josh)	2018

== Other releases ==
Single	Year
"Cheap Crisps" / "How Dare You"	2008
"Family Fortunes (with Trolley Snatcha)" / "Steppa"	2009
"Air Raid" (featuring Doctor P)	2009
"F*cking Noise" / "Digital Controller"	2009
"R00R" (Note: from All Stars EP)	2009
"Voscillate" / "Night Goes On"	2010
"How Rude" / "Show Off"	2010
"Voscillate" (Roksonix Remix) (Note: released after Roksonix won remix contest; included in Circus One)	2010
"Meathead"	2010
"Got 2 Know" / "Normalize"	2010
"Stinkfinger" (with Doctor P)	2010
"Excuse Me" (Note: from Beats & Pieces)	2010
"Jump Back VIP" (Note: from The Shady Bunch) (with SKisM featuring Foreign Beggars)	2013
"Come Find Me" (Note: from Circus Two) (with Cookie Monsta)	2013
"Standing on a Hill" (Note: Free download in celebration of one million Facebook fans)	2013
"Feel Your Love" (with Nghtmre featuring Jamie Lewis)	2016
"Cannonball" (with Snails)	2016

== Remixes ==
Song	Artist	Year
"Streets of Rage"	Picto	2009
"Sweet Shop"	Doctor P	2010
"Blue Skies"	Jamiroquai	2010
"All The Eastern Girls"	Chapel Club	2010
"Mishaps Happening"	Quantic	2010
"Gold Dust"	DJ Fresh featuring Ce'Cile	2010
"Cracks"	The Freestylers featuring Belle Humble	2010
"Louder" (with Doctor P)	DJ Fresh featuring Sian Evans	2011
"Internet Connection"	M.I.A.	2011
"Don't Do That"	Culprate	2011
"Midnight Run"	Example	2011
"Must Be the Feeling" (with Nero)	Nero	2012
"Syndicate Theme"	SyndicateGame	2012
"Without You" (with Doctor P)	Dillon Francis featuring Totally Enormous Extinct Dinosaurs	2013
"Bad Boy (Back Again)"	Danny Byrd	2013
"Recess"	Skrillex and Kill the Noise featuring Fatman Scoop and Michael Angelakos	2014
"Rebels Theme" (Flux Pavilion's The Ghost Remix/From "Star Wars: Rebels")	Kevin Kiner	2014
"Bada Bing" (with Doctor P)	Robots Can't Dance	2015
"We Come One"	Faithless	2016
"Thief"	Ookay	2017
"Kangaroo"	Winnetka Bowling League	2020
"Upside Down"	Whethan featuring Grouplove	2021
"Valley Girl"	Frank Zappa/Moon Zappa	2022

== Production credits ==
Single	Year	Artist	Album
"Level Up"	2012	Sway	The Deliverance
"Kisses Back"	2016	Matthew Koma	TBA
