= Blow the Roof =

EP by Flux Pavilion
- Released: 28 January 2013
- Genre: Dubstep; moombahcore; trap; hip hop
- Length: 34:21
- Label: Circus; Big Beat; Atlantic
- Producer: Flux Pavilion

Flux Pavilion chronology
Lines in Wax (2010)	Blow the Roof (2013)	Freeway (2013)

Blow the Roof is the second EP by English dubstep artist Flux Pavilion. It entered the UK Albums Chart at number 60 and the UK Dance Albums Chart at number four.

Blow the Roof represents a slight evolution of Flux Pavilion's typical production style while keeping it the same; according to Connor Hartley of the music blog Reigning Beats, "In the EP, Flux plays with his musical styles, performing some trap, some electro-hop, and some faster dubstep rhythms, but refuses to compromise the depth of his sound."

The first song that could be heard from the EP was "Double Edge" due to its inclusion in the video game Need for Speed: Most Wanted, which was released about 3 months before the EP. "Do or Die" (featuring Childish Gambino) was later released as a single alongside remixes from Flosstradamus and FuntCase. An official video was also filmed to accompany the release. The artwork for "Blow The Roof" was created by Jono Hislop.

The title song of the EP is featured in both the 2013 video game Saints Row IV and the 2012 Arrow episode "Unfinished Business".

== Track listing ==
All tracks are written by Joshua "Flux Pavilion" Steele.

No.	Title	Length
1.	"OneTwoThree (Make Your Body Wanna)"	4:10
2.	"The Scientist"	4:54
3.	"Double Edge" (featuring Sway & P Money)	3:26
4.	"Blow the Roof"	4:08
5.	"I Feel It"	5:14
6.	"I Still Can't Stop"	4:18
7.	"Do or Die" (featuring Childish Gambino)	4:04
8.	"Starlight"	4:12

Australia Bonus Tracks

No.	Title	Length
1.	"Superbad" (with Doctor P)	3:43
2.	"Daydreamer" (featuring Example)	3:33

== Charts ==
=== Weekly charts ===
Chart (2013)	Peak position
Scottish Albums (OCC)	99
UK Albums (OCC)	60
UK Album Downloads (OCC)	26
UK Dance Albums Chart	4
