= Jump (Rihanna song) =

2014 single by Rihanna

Song by Rihanna

from the album Unapologetic
- Recorded: 2012
- Studio: Roc the Mic Studios (New York City); R Studios (Los Angeles)
- Genre: Dubstep
- Length: 4:24
- Label: Def Jam; SRP
- Songwriters: Kevin Cossom; M. B. Williams; Mikkel S. Eriksen; Tor Erik Hermansen; Saul Milton; Will Kennard; Stephen Garrett; Elgin Lumpkin; Tim Mosley
- Producers: Stargate; Chase & Status; Kuk Harrell

"Jump" is a song recorded by Barbadian singer Rihanna for her seventh studio album, Unapologetic (2012). It was written by Kevin Cossom, M. B. Williams, Stargate and Chase & Status, with production done by the latter two and Kuk Harrell. It interpolates the lyrics of the 1996 single "Pony", performed by Ginuwine. Its composition and structure received comparisons to not only Justin Timberlake's song "Cry Me a River" and Magnetic Man's "I Need Air", but also to some of Rihanna's previous songs, including "Rude Boy" and "Red Lipstick". A remix of the song called "Jump (Club Cheval Rap Remix)" by rapper Theophilus London was leaked onto the internet.

The song received generally positive reviews from music critics. Many reviewers thought that "Jump" stood out as one of a couple of highlights on Unapologetic, while a few others singled it out as the sole highlight. However, it prompted a mixed reaction from James Montgomery for MTV, who thought that the dubstep bass line produced a "mixed result". Genevieve Koski for The A.V. Club, who wrote that the track should not have been included on the album as it is a poor song choice, commented that songs like "Jump" are responsible for simply furthering her career in the music industry. Following the release of Unapologetic, "Jump" debuted on the French Singles Chart at number 153 and the UK Singles Chart at number 150 due to strong digital download sales.

== Background and production ==
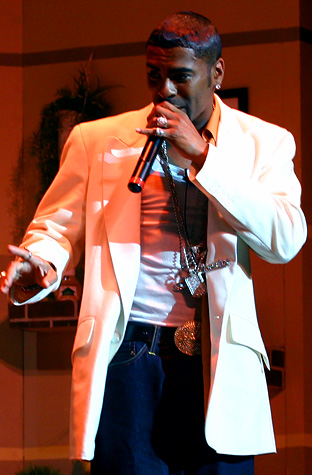
"Jump" samples Ginuwine's 1996 single "Pony".

Rihanna began developing a "new sound" for her seventh studio album in March 2012, even though she had not yet begun recording. On September 12, 2012, Def Jam France announced via Twitter that Rihanna would release a new single the upcoming week while her seventh studio album was scheduled to be released in November 2012. However, the tweet was shortly deleted and replaced with another clarifying that more information will available the next day (September 13). Via her official Twitter account, Rihanna posted series of "teasing" tweets announcing her seventh studio album. On October 11, 2012, in one of her tweets revealed that the title of her new album is Unapologetic along with its cover.

"Jump" is the overall sixth and final single off Unapologetic. It was written by Kevin Cossom and M. B. Williams together with its producers Stargate (Mikkel S. Eriksen and Tor Erik Hermansen) and Chase & Status (Saul Milton and Will Kennard). The song interpolates of "Pony" (1996), as performed by Ginuwine and written by Elgin "Ginuwine" Lumpkin, Stephen Garrett and Timothy "Timbaland" Mosley. In an interview with MTV News Ginuwine stated: "You know what? My management told me she wanted to use it, and Rihanna, I'm a fan of hers and I love what she's doing. You got to embrace it! You can't be a stickler... especially when an artist like Rihanna wants to use it". He further said that he is anxious to hear what the singer has done with the sample and hopes that it will do a good job for her, just as it did for him.

Eriksen and Miles Walker recorded "Jump" at Roc the Mic Studio in New York, while Aamir Yaqub served as the assistant vocal engineer. Kuk Harrell provided the vocal production of the song and also recorded Rihanna's vocals together with Marcos Tovar at R Studios in Los Angeles. It was mixed by Phil Than at Ninja Club Studios in Atlanta with Daniela Rivera serving as assistant mixing engineer. Cossom sang additional vocals, while all the instruments and programming were provided by Eriksen, Hermansen, Mikey Mike and Chase & Status.

== Composition and lyrical interpretation ==
"Jump"
A sample of "Jump", the song "utilizes dubstep's distinctive bass sound to approximate the belching chorus of the original song"

"Jump" is a song that runs four minutes and twenty-four seconds, and "utilizes dubstep's distinctive bass sound to approximate the belching chorus of the original song". According to Brad Stern of MTV Buzzworthy, "Jump" features "sexy, slow burning" chorus and resembles Rihanna's 2010 single "Rude Boy" (Rated R, 2009). Daily Mirror's Priya Elan also compared "Jump" to the singer's song "Red Lipstick" (Talk That Talk, 2011), while James Bien of The Daily Northwestern found it similar to the 2010 single by Magnetic Man, "I Need Air". Melissa Maerz of Entertainment Weekly labeled the song a "dubstep-warped banger".

Eric Henderson for Slant Magazine disapproved of "Jump", writing that it is an "ice-cold" and "echoey dubstep torture chamber" whereby Rihanna interpolates Ginuwine's "Pony" sample void of emotion. Rihanna's vocals on the song sound similar to the vocals by Justin Timberlake on his 2002 single "Cry Me a River" (Justified, 2002). Lyrically, in "Jump" Rihanna preaches to her former partner that she won't be chasing him. Jude Rodgers of The Guardian described it as a "see sex wriggling everywhere". In the song, the singer sings "Skrillex-worthy" lines, "You think I give a damn/ but you know who I am/ I don't go around chasing no dude". The chorus features Rihanna singing, "If you want it, let's do it/ Ridin' my pony/ My saddle is waitin'/ Come and jump on it."

== Remix ==
Rapper Theophilus London remixed the song, a remix which leaked under the title "Jump (Club Cheval Rap Remix)". Additional production to the song was added by Club Cheval. Several new lines were added, such as "I don't follow the trend/ the trend follow me, bruh" and "I'm in Nice getting nice with some freaks/ Hermes, bubble bath, so I'm feelin' freeesh." He also quotes lyrics from Rihanna's 2012 single "Diamonds" in the line, "Versace, chrome, we're shinin'/Shine bright like a Neil Diamond." Michael Depland of MTV Buzzworthy praised the remix and wrote that it makes the song sound even better.

== Critical reception ==
Allison Stewart for The Washington Post thought that "Jump" stood out as one of the highlights of Unapologetic, describing it as a "monster in the making". Along with "Stay", Stewart listed "Jump" as her top two songs on the album. Alike Stewart, Melissa Maerz for Entertainment Weekly wrote that "Jump" was one of her top recommendations to listen to along with "Diamonds". Stacey-Ann Ellis for Vibe thought that "Jump" could be "mosh-inducing" if played in a nightclub. Michael Gallucci for PopCrush also agreed that "Jump" is one of Unapologetic's best songs, writing that "It's an unofficial rule in pop music that any song titled 'Jump' is going to be great (see Pointer Sisters, Van Halen, Kriss Kross, etc.). Rihanna's is no exception". Chris Younie for 4Music echoed Gallucci's sentiments, writing that it is one of the best songs on the album. He further wrote that he felt as though the album peaked after the second track, "Diamonds", had finished, but stated that "Jump" filled void between that and the former.

James Montgomery for MTV News thought that the dubstep bass line produced a "mixed result", but he praised the sample of Ginuwine's "Pony". Genevieve Koski for The A.V. Club criticised "Jump", writing that it is the "perfect example" of poor decision making with regard to song choices for the album, which her opinion, have "elevated" Rihanna's career. She brandished the song as "trashy decadence without shame". Robery Copsey for Digital Spy felt that the song embodied "a sense of last-minute record label box-ticking", with particular emphasis on Chase & Status' presence and the "wobble" of the chorus. He continued it described "Jump" as a "safe option" to include on the album.

== Credits and personnel ==
Recording

- Recorded at Roc the Mic Studios, New York City, New York
- Vocals recorded at R Studios, Los Angeles, California.
- Mixed at Ninja Club Studios, Atlanta, Georgia.

Sample

- Contains samples of "Pony" performed by Ginuwine and written by Elgin Lumpkin, Stephen Garrett and Timothy Mosley.

Personnel

- Songwriting – Kevin Cossom, M. B. Williams, Mikkel S. Eriksen, Tor Erik Hermansen, Saul Milton, Will Kennard
- Production – Stargate, Chase & Status
- Recording engineers – Mikkel S. Eriksen, Miles Walker
- Assistant vocal engineer – Aamir Yaqub
- Vocal recording – Kuk Harrell, Marcos Tovar
- Vocal production – Kuk Harrell
- Mixing – Phil Than
- Additional/assistant engineering – Daniela Rivera
- Additional vocals – Kevin "KC" Cossom
- Instruments and programming – Mikkel S. Eriksen, Tor Erik Hermansen, Mikey Mike, Chase & Status

Credits adapted from the liner notes of Unapologetic, Def Jam Recordings, SRP Records.

== Chart performance ==
Following the release of Unapologetic, "Jump" debuted on two national single charts due to strong digital download sales. In France, it debuted at number 153 for the week dated December 1, 2012, and fell to number 191 the following week; it spent a total of two weeks on the chart. In the United Kingdom, it debuted at number 150 on December 2, 2012. It peaked at number 34 on the R&B/Hip-hop Digital Songs chart on December 3, 2012. In Oceania, it attained commercial success after being released as a single. It peaked at number 10 in New-Zealand and at number 5 in Australia, where it was certified Platinum for shipments over 75,000 copies.

== Charts ==
=== Weekly charts ===
| Chart (2012–14) | Peak position |
|---|---|
| Australia (ARIA) | 5 |
| Australia Urban (ARIA) | 2 |
| France (SNEP) | 153 |
| New Zealand (Recorded Music NZ) | 10 |
| UK Singles Chart (OCC) | 150 |
| US R&B/Hip-Hop Digital Songs (Billboard) | 34 |

=== Year-end charts ===
| Chart (2014) | Position |
|---|---|
| Australia (ARIA) | 90 |

== Certifications ==
| Region | Certification | Certified units/sales |
|---|---|---|
| Australia (ARIA) | 2× Platinum | 140,000^{‡} |
| New Zealand (RMNZ) | Gold | 7,500^{*} |
^{*} Sales figures based on certification alone.^{‡} Sales+streaming figures based on certification alone.
