= Now That's What I Call Running =

Compilation album by Various artists
- Released: 2 March 2012
- Recorded: 1982, 1983, 1984, 1986, 1989, 1993, 1998, 1999, 2000, 2001, 2003, 2004, 2005, 2006, 2007, 2008, 2009, 2010, 2011
- Genre: Pop
- Label: Sony Music Entertainment, EMI, Virgin Music Group, UMG, Warner Music Group

Various artists chronology
Now That's What I Call Love (2012)	Now That's What I Call Running (2012)	Now That's What I Call Britain (2012)

Now That's What I Call Running or Now Running is a triple-disc compilation album which was released in the United Kingdom on 5 March 2012.

== Track listing ==
=== Disc 1 ===
No.	Title	Artist	Length
1.	"Domino"	Jessie J	3:53
2.	"Firework"	Katy Perry	3:49
3.	"Disturbia"	Rihanna	3:59
4.	"Forget You"	Cee Lo Green	3:42
5.	"Moves Like Jagger"	Maroon 5 feat. Christina Aguilera	3:22
6.	"Club Can't Handle Me"	Flo Rida feat. David Guetta	3:53
7.	"Give Me Everything"	Pitbull feat. Ne-Yo, Afrojack & Nayer	4:13
8.	"Sexy and I Know It"	LMFAO	3:20
9.	"On the Floor"	Jennifer Lopez	3:40
10.	"When Love Takes Over"	David Guetta feat.Kelly Rowland	3:23
11.	"Cooler Than Me"	Mike Posner	3:34
12.	"Mercy"	Duffy	3:41
13.	"Black and Gold"	Sam Sparro	3:31
14.	"What You Waiting For?"	Gwen Stefani	3:44
15.	"Jai Ho! (You Are My Destiny)"	A.R. Rahman & the Pussycat Dolls	3:42
16.	"Ready for the Weekend"	Calvin Harris	3:37
17.	"Maneater"	Nelly Furtado	4:20
18.	"Kickstarts"	Example	3:02
19.	"Young Folks"	Peter Bjorn & John feat. Victoria Bergsman	4:01
20.	"Sweet Disposition"	The Temper Trap	3:53
21.	"Paradise"	Coldplay	4:23

=== Disc 2 ===
No.	Title	Artist	Length
1.	"Written in the Stars"	Tinie Tempah feat. Eric Turner	3:28
2.	"Born This Way"	Lady Gaga	4:21
3.	"Waka Waka (This Time for Africa)" (The Official 2010 FIFA World Cup Song)	Shakira	3:23
4.	"We No Speak Americano"	Yolanda Be Cool & D Cup	2:11
5.	"Mr. Saxobeat"	Alexandra Stan	2:32
6.	"Levels"	Avicii	3:18
7.	"Evacuate the Dancefloor"	Cascada	3:26
8.	"Higher"	Taio Cruz	3:08
9.	"Hello"	Martin Solveig	2:46
10.	"Barbra Streisand"	Duck Sauce	2:21
11.	"Antidote"	Swedish House Mafia vs. Knife Party	3:00
12.	"Sweat"	Snoop Dogg vs. David Guetta	3:16
13.	"Sandstorm"	Darude	3:46
14.	"Promises"	Nero	4:09
15.	"In for the Kill"	La Roux	4:09
16.	"Shake It"	Metro Station	3:00
17.	"Pump It"	The Black Eyed Peas	3:34
18.	"Hey Ya!"	OutKast	3:46
19.	"Louder"	DJ Fresh feat. Sian Evans	3:27
20.	"I Need Air"	Magnetic Man	4:16
21.	"Fireflies"	Owl City	3:50

=== Disc 3 ===
No.	Title	Artist	Length
1.	"No Regrets"	Dappy	3:50
2.	"99 Problems"	Jay-Z	3:55
3.	"Eye of the Tiger"	Survivor	4:00
4.	"Push It"	Salt-n-Pepa	4:29
5.	"Are You Gonna Go My Way?"	Lenny Kravitz	3:32
6.	"My Favourite Game"	The Cardigans	3:37
7.	"Human"	The Killers	4:07
8.	"Beautiful Day"	U2	4:06
9.	"Dakota"	Stereophonics	4:03
10.	"Dog Days Are Over"	Florence + the Machine	4:12
11.	"Chelsea Dagger"	The Fratellis	3:35
12.	"I Predict a Riot"	Kaiser Chiefs	3:52
13.	"One Way or Another"	Blondie	3:26
14.	"Maniac"	Michael Sembello	4:18
15.	"Footloose"	Kenny Loggins	3:46
16.	"Here It Goes Again"	OK Go	3:00
17.	"The Best"	Tina Turner	5:29
18.	"Gonna Fly Now" (Theme from Rocky)	Bill Conti	2:50

== Charts ==
Chart (2012)	Peak Position
UK Compilations Chart	1
UK Download Albums Chart	2

== Certifications ==
Sales certifications for Now That's What I Call Running
Region	Certification	Certified units/sales
United Kingdom (BPI)	Platinum	300,000^{*}
^{*} Sales figures based on certification alone.

== Release history ==
Country	Release date
Ireland	2 March 2012
United Kingdom	5 March 2012
