= Chapter II (Benga album) =

Studio album by Benga
- Released: 6 May 2013
- Recorded: 2011–2013
- Genre: Bass music, dubstep
- Label: Sony
- Producer: Benga; Route 94

Benga chronology
Diary of an Afro Warrior (2008)	Chapter II (2013)

Singles from Chapter II
- 1. "I Will Never Change" Released: 16 March 2012; 2. "To Hell and Back" Released: 17 December 2012; 3. "Forefather" Released: 7 March 2013

Mini Mix cover
- Chapter II (Mini Mix)

Professional ratings
Review scores
Source	Rating
Allmusic	3/5 stars

Chapter II is the third studio album by British record producer Benga. The album was released on 6 May 2013 through Sony Music. It entered the UK Albums Chart at number 93.

== Background and development ==
The album was produced from late 2011 to 2013. On 30 November 2011, Benga and Youngman performed at 1Xtra Live. They premiered "Running" live from Bristol. The first official single from the album was "I Will Never Change", released in March 2012. In June 2012, Benga and P Money performed a live version of "High Speed" on BBC Radio 1Xtra in Maida Vale Studios. Benga himself provided vocoded vocals. Several singles released throughout 2012 were omitted from the album: "Icon", "Pour Your Love", "We're Coming Out" and "Open Your Eyes". However, "Pour Your Love" (released on 24 August 2012) is the only song so far to chart in the United Kingdom, charting at number 189 in the UK Singles Chart.

A series of three heavier songs advertised as "club singles" were released throughout December 2012: "We're Coming Out", "Open Your Eyes" and "To Hell and Back". The latter is the only one to feature on the album. The album's initial release date was set to be 22 April 2013, but it was delayed by two weeks. Benga supported Example on his 2013 arena tour around the United Kingdom, with Youngman providing vocals for his "Benga Live" sets. Several songs from the album were performed on tour, including "Choose 1"; "Smile"; "Getting 42"; "To Hell and Back"; "I Will Never Change"; and "Forefather", which got its live debut at the Manchester Arena on March 1 with a live PA from Kano. "Smile" features uncredited vocals from Charli XCX.

== Singles ==
- "I Will Never Change" is the album's lead single. It was released on 16 March 2012. The track was the first to be written on the album, and its upload on UKF has over one and a half million YouTube views. The official video premiered on Benga's Vevo on 5 April 2013 at a total length of two minutes and one second. The video features the song's waveform being created in stop motion out of 960 differently sized vinyls.
- "To Hell and Back" is the second single from the album. It was released on 17 December 2012. On Example's 2013 arena tour, P Money performed a live PA which doesn't feature on the studio version of the track.
- "Forefather" with Kano is the third single from the album. It was released on 7 March 2013 and entered the UK Singles Chart at number 123. The official video premiered on Benga's Vevo on 10 March 2013 at a total length of three minutes and thirty-eight seconds. The video compares Benga and Kano's lifestyles in 2003, 2008 and 2013: showing that although their success has changed their surroundings, their music is still "sounding like some old-school KA". It is the only explicit track on the album.

== Track listing ==
No.	Title	Length
1.	"Yellow"	4:47
2.	"Smile" (featuring Charli XCX)	3:47
3.	"Click and Tap"	2:58
4.	"Forefather" (with Kano)	3:59
5.	"I Will Never Change"	4:42
6.	"Choose 1" (featuring Youngman)	4:40
7.	"There's No Soul"	4:48
8.	"Higher" (featuring Autumn Rowe)	3:19
9.	"To Hell and Back"	4:41
10.	"Warzone" (featuring Sam Frank)	3:52
11.	"High Speed" (featuring P Money)	3:45
12.	"Chapter II To Inspire"	2:33
13.	"Running"	3:45
14.	"Waiting" (featuring Happiness)	3:33

Deluxe edition bonus tracks
No.	Title	Length
15.	"Getting 42"	4:14
16.	"Waiting" (featuring Happiness) (Club Deluxe Mix)	4:03
17.	"Break Out the System"	5:27
18.	"Album Mini Mix" (featuring Youngman)	40:03

== Personnel ==
Credits adapted from Chapter II album liner notes.

- Adegbenga "Benga" Adejumo – mixing, engineering, producer (all tracks), vocals (11)
- Autumn Rowe - vocals (8)
- Ayo Simpson - engineering (14)
- Charlotte Emma "Charli XCX" Aitchison - vocals (2)
- Daniel "Danny C" Caim - vocal recording (11)
- Daniel Ledinsky - backing vocals (14)
- Jack Tarrant - mixing, engineering (8, 14)
- Kane "Kano" Robinson - vocals (4)
- Michael "Mikey J" Asante - vocal recording, vocal mixing (4)
- Paris "P Money" Moore-Williams - vocals (11)
- Rowan "Route 94" Jones - co-producer (2)
- Rudie Edwards - vocals (14)
- Sam Frank - vocals, saxophone (10)
- Simon "Youngman" Smith - vocals (6, 13)
- Stuart Hawkes - mastering (all tracks)

== Chart performance ==
=== Weekly charts ===
Chart (2013)	Peak position
UK Albums (OCC)	93
UK Album Downloads (OCC)	83
UK Dance Albums (OCC)	13

== Release history ==
Region	Date	Format	Label
UK & Ireland	6 May 2013	Digital download, CD	Sony
