= Now That's What I Call Love (disambiguation) =

- Now That's What I Call Love released on 7 February 1994
- Now That's What I Call Love 2 (UK series) released on 9 February 2009
- Now That's What I Call Love (U.S. album) released on 26 January 2010
- Now That's What I Call Love (2012 UK album) released on 30 January 2012
