= Live & Direct (P Money album) =

Studio album by P Money
- Released: 25 November 2016
- Recorded: 2016
- Genre: Grime; electronic
- Length: 49:48
- Label: Rinse

Live & Direct is the debut studio album by English grime MC P Money. It was released on 25 November 2016 through Rinse.

Live & Direct was released after 10 years of singles, EPs and mixtapes by P Money. The album was made after his feature role on KSI's "Lamborghini", which reached number 30 on the UK Singles Chart and gained him newfound popularity from KSI fans and those who were not grime listeners.

The album features guest appearances from Solo 45, Stormzy, OGz, Rubylee, Splurgeboys, JME, Wiley and NY. The album was announced on 29 September 2016 after P Money released the single "Panasonic" and releasing a 15-minute freestyle on BBC Radio 1Xtra with MistaJam.

The album charted at number one on the UK Indie Breakers Albums Chart on 3 December 2016 and stayed number one for a week. It also charted at number 12 on the UK iTunes albums chart.

== Track listing ==
Credits adapted from the album's liner notes.

No.	Title	Writer(s)	Producer(s)	Length
1.	"Intro"	Paris Moore-Williams	The HeavyTrackerz	3:17
2.	"Panasonic"	Moore-Williams	Deeco	2:49
3.	"Welcome to England" (featuring Solo 45)	Moore-Williams; Solo 45	The HeavyTrackerz	3:57
4.	"Keepin' It Real" (featuring Stormzy)	Moore-Williams; Michael Ebenazer Kwadjo Omari Owuo Jr.	Joker	3:44
5.	"Mans Involved" (featuring OGz)	Moore-Williams; OGz	Star.One	4:09
6.	"Contagious" (featuring Rubylee)	Moore-Williams; Rubylee	Terror Danjah	3:42
7.	"Carter (Skit)"	Moore-Williams		0:45
8.	"Don't Holla at Me" (featuring Splurgeboys)	Moore-Williams; Splurgeboys	Splurgeboys	3:26
9.	"Conspiracy Don"	Moore-Williams	DaVinChe	3:08
10.	"Fake Fans"	Moore-Williams	Chase & Status	3:29
11.	"Gunfingers" (featuring Jme and Wiley)	Moore-Williams; Jamie Adenuga; Richard Kylea Cowie Jr.	Skepta	2:48
12.	"Lyrics & Flows"	Moore-Williams	Sukh Knight	3:14
13.	"Take Over" (featuring NY)	Moore-Williams; NY	Joker	4:09
14.	"The Credits"	Moore-Williams	Mr. Mitch	5:50
15.	"10/10"	Moore-Williams	Sir Spyro	4:21
Total length:				49:48
