= Midnight Run (song) =

Single by Example

from the album Playing in the Shadows
- Released: 4 December 2011
- Recorded: 2011
- Genre: Europop; trance
- Length: 3:59
- Label: Ministry of Sound
- Songwriter(s): Elliot Gleave
- Producer(s): Feed Me

Example singles chronology
"Natural Disaster" (2011)	"Midnight Run" (2011)	"Daydreamer" (2012)

"Midnight Run" is a song by British singer Example from Example's third studio album, Playing in the Shadows. It was released on 4 December 2011 in the United Kingdom as the album's fourth single with an entire remix album on iTunes. The song was produced by Feed Me.

== Music video ==
A music video to accompany the release of "Midnight Run" was first released onto YouTube on 21 October 2011 at a total length of four minutes and four seconds. The video was filmed in Iceland, and sees Example sink into his bathtub before emerging out of an Icelandic spring. He then embarks on a road trip with a mysterious blonde woman before arriving at a secluded cottage beneath the mesmerizing Northern Lights. The video showcases a classic Ford Mustang Fastback from 1966, adorned with a special license plate reading "FEED ME" as a tribute to the song's producer. This vintage car is equipped with a powerful High Performance 289 V-8 engine and boasts the iconic Pony Interior package in Red.

== Track listing ==
Digital download
No.	Title	Length
1.	"Midnight Run" (Radio Edit)	3:58
2.	"Midnight Run" (Flux Pavilion Remix)	5:45
3.	"Midnight Run" (Wilkinson Remix)	4:35
4.	"Midnight Run" (Sheldrake Remix)	4:37
5.	"Midnight Run" (Funkagenda Remix)	7:53
6.	"Midnight Run" (Wideboys Remix)	5:58

CD single
No.	Title	Length
1.	"Midnight Run" (Radio Edit)	4:01
2.	"Midnight Run" (Wideboys Edit)	3:40
3.	"Midnight Run" (Wilkinson Remix)	4:37
4.	"Midnight Run" (Flux Pavilion Remix)	5:47
5.	"Midnight Run" (Sheldrake Remix)	4:39
6.	"Midnight Run" (Funkagenda Remix)	7:55
7.	"Midnight Run" (Wideboys Remix)	6:00
8.	"Midnight Run" (Instrumental Edit)	4:01

12-inch vinyl
No.	Title	Length
1.	"Midnight Run" (Flux Pavilion Remix)	5:47
2.	"Midnight Run" (Wilkinson Remix)	4:37

== Chart performance ==
The song peaked at number 30 on the UK Singles Chart marking his eighth top 40 hit.

Chart (2011–12)	Peak position
Australia (ARIA)	91
Australian Club Chart (ARIA)	49
Slovakia (Rádio Top 100)	64
UK Singles (OCC)	30
UK Dance (OCC)	5
UK Indie (OCC)	1

== Release history ==
Region	Date	Label	Format
United Kingdom	4 December 2011	Ministry of Sound	Digital download, vinyl, CD single
