= Evangeline (Mary Anne Hobbs compilation) =

Compilation album by Various artists
- Released: June 16, 2008
- Recorded: Various times
- Genres: Dubstep, Grime, Experimental
- Label: Planet Mu

Evangeline is a compilation album of electronic music (largely dubstep and grime) released in 2008 on the Planet Mu label. The album was compiled by Mary Anne Hobbs and features tracks, many exclusive.

The album is available in two formats: CD and a set of four vinyl records. Unitz's The Drop and Tes La Rok featuring Uncle Sam's "Up in the VIP" are only available on the CD version.

== CD track listing ==
1. Ital Tek: "Archaic" (4:32)
2. Unitz: "The Drop" (4:41)
3. Shackleton: "In the Void" (4:56)
4. Cult Of The 13th Hour: "Way of the Gun" (3:59)
5. Wiley: "Local Lad" (2:42)
6. Headhunter and Ekelon: "Timewarp" (5:06)
7. Darqwan: "Universal Want-ing" (5:07)
8. Ben Frost: "Theory of Machines" (9:28)
9. Flying Lotus: "Flattery (Sympathy for the Biters)" (2:57)
10. Dakimh: "Done" (4:37)
11. Pinch: "E.Motiv" (5:28)
12. Magnetic Man: "Ligma VIP" (4:50)
13. Tes La Rok featuring Uncle Sam: "Up in the VIP" (5:35)
14. Surgeon: "Right Road to Dubland" (4:52)
15. Boxcutter: "Kab 27" (5:38)
16. Claro Intelecto: "Beautiful Death" (3:46)

== Vinyl track listing ==
1. Ital Tek: "Archaic" (4:32)
2. Shackleton: "In the Void" (4:56)
3. Cult Of The 13th Hour: "Way of the Gun" (3:59)
4. Wiley: "Local Lad" (2:42)
5. Headhunter and Ekelon: "Timewarp" (5:06)
6. Darqwan: "Universal Want-ing" (5:07)
7. Ben Frost: "Theory of Machines" (9:28)
8. Flying Lotus: "Flattery (Sympathy for the Biters)" (2:57)
9. Dakimh: "Done" (4:37)
10. Pinch: "E.Motiv" (5:28)
11. Magnetic Man: "Ligma VIP" (4:50)
12. Surgeon: "Right Road to Dubland" (4:52)
13. Boxcutter: "Kab 27" (5:38)
14. Claro Intelecto: "Beautiful Death" (3:46)
