= Now That's What I Call Love (2012 UK album) =

Compilation album by Various artists
- Released: January 30, 2012 (UK)
- Recorded: 1997, 2004, 2005, 2006, 2007, 2008, 2009, 2010, 2011
- Genre: Pop
- Label: Sony Music Entertainment, EMI, Virgin Music Group, UMG, Warner Music Group

Various artists chronology
Now That's What I Call Disney (2011)	Now That's What I Call Love (2012)	Now That's What I Call Running (2012)

Now That's What I Call Love or Now Love is a double-disc compilation album released in the United Kingdom on 30 January 2012.

Now Love features eleven songs which reached number one on the UK Singles Chart: "Only Girl (in the World)", "Fight for This Love", "When Love Takes Over", "Changed the Way You Kiss Me", "Glad You Came", "Never Leave You", "Meet Me Halfway", "Don't Hold Your Breath", "Smile", "The Promise" and "Greatest Day".

== Track listing ==
=== Disc 1 ===
No.	Title	Artist	Length
1.	"Only Girl (in the World)"	Rihanna
2.	"Teenage Dream"	Katy Perry	3:47
3.	"Fight for This Love"	Cheryl Cole
4.	"All the Lovers"	Kylie Minogue
5.	"When Love Takes Over"	David Guetta feat. Kelly Rowland
6.	"Changed the Way You Kiss Me"	Example
7.	"About You Now"	Sugababes
8.	"If We Ever Meet Again"	Timbaland feat. Katy Perry
9.	"Glad You Came"	The Wanted
10.	"Shine A Light"	McFly feat. Taio Cruz
11.	"Never Leave You"	Tinchy Stryder feat. Amelle Berrabah
12.	"I Need You Tonight"	Professor Green feat. Ed Drewett
13.	"Meet Me Halfway"	The Black Eyed Peas
14.	"Heartbreaker"	will.i.am feat. Cheryl Cole
15.	"I'm into You"	Jennifer Lopez feat. Lil Wayne
16.	"Don't Hold Your Breath"	Nicole Scherzinger
17.	"Suddenly I See"	KT Tunstall
18.	"Smile"	Lily Allen
19.	"The Promise"	Girls Aloud
20.	"Heaven"	Emeli Sandé

=== Disc 2 ===
No.	Title	Artist	Length
1.	"You Got The Love"	Florence + the Machine
2.	"Greatest Day"	Take That
3.	"Invincible"	Tinie Tempah feat. Kelly Rowland
4.	"Baby"	Justin Bieber feat. Ludacris
5.	"One in a Million"	Ne-Yo
6.	"Apologize"	Timbaland feat. OneRepublic
7.	"Put Your Records On"	Corrine Bailey Rae
8.	"Alejandro"	Lady Gaga
9.	"Nobody's Perfect"	Jessie J
10.	"My Heart Takes Over"	The Saturdays
11.	"Broken Strings"	James Morrison & Nelly Furtado
12.	"Warwick Avenue"	Duffy
13.	"Your Song"	Ellie Goulding
14.	"Wherever You Will Go"	Charlene Soraia
15.	"She's Always a Woman"	Fyfe Dangerfield
16.	"Back to Black"	Amy Winehouse
17.	"Cry Me Out"	Pixie Lott
18.	"California King Bed"	Rihanna
19.	"Fix You"	Coldplay
20.	"Angels"	Robbie Williams

== Charts ==
Chart (2012)	Peak Position
UK Compilations Chart	3
