= Playing in the Shadows =

Studio album by Example
- Released: 4 September 2011
- Genre: Dance; trance; dubstep; grime
- Length: 48:59
- Label: Ministry of Sound; Data
- Producer: Funkagenda; Nero; Michael Woods; Faithless; Laidback Luke; Sheldrake; DC Breaks; Brookes Brothers; Chase & Status; Feed Me; Skream; Third Strike; Tom Neville; Dirty South; Felguk

Example chronology
Won't Go Quietly (2010)	Playing in the Shadows (2011)	The Evolution of Man (2012)

Singles from Playing in the Shadows
- 1. "Changed the Way You Kiss Me" Released: 5 June 2011; 2. "Stay Awake" Released: 28 August 2011; 3. "Natural Disaster" Released: 16 October 2011; 4. "Midnight Run" Released: 4 December 2011

Professional ratings
Review scores
Source	Rating
Allmusic	3.5/5 stars
NME	7/10
Q	3/5 stars
BBC	positive
The Observer	2/5 stars
The Guardian	3/5 stars
RapReviews	6/10 stars
Virgin Media	3/5 stars
Drowned in Sound	4/10 stars

Playing in the Shadows is the third studio album by British recording artist Example, released on 4 September 2011 through Ministry of Sound. Example confirmed that much like the previous album, there would be no collaborations, besides that of producers (including frequent collaborator Skream). During an interview, Example said the album remains dance oriented, although he would make a gradual move into electronic and dubstep genres.

The album's release was preceded by two singles, "Changed the Way You Kiss Me" and "Stay Awake", which both peaked atop of the UK Singles Chart. A third single, Laidback Luke collaboration "Natural Disaster", has been released on 16 October. A fourth single, "Midnight Run" was released on 4 December.

== Background and development ==
In an interview with Lowe he revealed that his third album would be released in September 2011 entitled Playing in the Shadows. Example described the album as a darker record than previous album Won't Go Quietly ("dark, epic beast"). He also said production on the record will come from Michael Woods, Skream, Nero, Faithless, Brookes Brothers, Dirty South and hopefully Chase & Status, as well as writing with English songwriter and producer Guy Chambers. Funkagenda will be producing the intro track also (as per their respective Twitter feeds). In a discussion on Twitter, Example also revealed the final track to be completed on his album would be produced by Feed Me.

== Singles ==
- "Changed the Way You Kiss Me" was the album's lead single. It is produced by Michael Woods and was released on 5 June 2011. On 24 March 2011 "Changed the Way You Kiss Me" debuted on BBC Radio 1 as Zane Lowe's Hottest Record in the World. The video was released on Example's website on 24 April 2011. The single debuted at number 1 on the UK Singles Chart. "Changed the Way You Kiss Me" is featured in Adidas' launch event for new Predator Football boots.
- "Stay Awake" was the second single from the album and was produced by Nero. The single debuted on 1 July 2011 on Annie Mac's BBC Radio 1 show and was released on 28 August 2011. The video premiered on 18 July 2011. The single debuted at number 1 on the UK Singles Chart.
- "Natural Disaster" was released on 16 October. It debuted at number 37 on the UK charts. The song is a collaboration with Dutch DJ Laidback Luke. The single is billed to Laidback Luke vs. Example.
- "Midnight Run" was the fourth single from the album, which was released on 4 December 2011 and was produced by Feed Me. The song debuted at number 30 on the UK official charts. However the single topped the UK Indie chart with 1 and achieved 5 on the UK dance chart.

== Other singles ==
- "Shot Yourself in the Foot Again" was released as a free download in January 2011. The track is produced by Skream and has gained over 13 million views on YouTube. It features on Example's album as an iTunes bonus track. Although it was a free download, it managed to chart at 82 in the UK.
- The iTunes bonus track "Plastic Smile" (with Felguk) is featured as the B-side track of Felguk's "Jack It" EP and on the 2012 video game SSX. The track has not made any major chart appearances, although it has charted at No. 39 in the UK Indie Chart.

== Track listing ==
No.	Title	Writer(s)	Producer(s)	Length
1.	"Skies Don't Lie"	Elliot Gleave; Adam Walder	Funkagenda	4:24
2.	"Stay Awake"	Gleave; Daniel Stephens; Joseph Ray	Nero	3:24
3.	"Changed the Way You Kiss Me"	Gleave; Michael Woods	Woods	3:15
4.	"The Way"	Gleave; Rollo Armstrong; Ayalah Bentovim	Faithless	4:28
5.	"Natural Disaster" (Laidback Luke vs. Example) (Extended Album Version)	Gleave; Lucas van Scheppingen	Laidback Luke	5:05
6.	"Never Had a Day"	Gleave; Andy Sheldrake	Sheldrake; DC Breaks	3:53
7.	"Microphone"	Gleave; Guy Chambers	Brookes Brothers	4:16
8.	"Playing in the Shadows"	Gleave; Iain Archer	Chase & Status	4:39
9.	"Midnight Run"	Gleave; Jon Gooch	Feed Me	3:58
10.	"Under the Influence"	Gleave; Oliver Jones	Skream	4:55
11.	"Wrong in the Head"	Gleave; Tom Neville	Neville; Brookes Brothers	3:11
12.	"Anything"	Gleave; Dragan Roganović	Dirty South	3:31
Total length:				48:59

CD bonus track
No.	Title	Writer(s)	Producer(s)	Length
13.	"Lying to Yourself"	Gleave; Eddie Jenkins	Jenkins; Wez Clarke	3:34
Total length:				52:33

iTunes bonus tracks
No.	Title	Producer(s)	Length
13.	"Plastic Smile" (Example vs. Felguk)	Felguk	4:42
14.	"Shot Yourself in the Foot Again" (Skream & Example)	Skream	3:42
15.	"Changed the Way You Kiss Me" (Friction Remix)	Michael Woods	4:46
Total length:			62:09

== Charts ==
=== Weekly charts ===
Chart (2011)	Peak position
Australian Albums (ARIA)	14
German Albums (Offizielle Top 100)	43
Irish Albums (IRMA)	6
New Zealand Albums (RMNZ)	22
Scottish Albums (OCC)	3
Swiss Albums (Schweizer Hitparade)	59
UK Albums (OCC)	1
UK Dance Albums (OCC)	1

=== Year-end charts ===
Chart (2011)	Position
UK Albums (OCC)	43
Chart (2012)	Position
UK Albums (OCC)	120

== Release history ==
Region	Date	Format	Label
Ireland	4 September 2011	Digital download, CD	Ministry of Sound
United Kingdom	4 September 2011	Digital download, CD	Ministry of Sound
Australia	9 September 2011	Digital download, CD	Ministry of Sound
