= Getting Nowhere =

Single by Magnetic Man featuring John Legend

from the album Magnetic Man
- Released: 18 February 2011
- Recorded: 2010
- Genre: Dubstep
- Length: 4:30
- Label: Sony
- Songwriter(s): John Stephens; Amanda Ghost; Oliver Jones; Benga Adejumo; Arthur Smith
- Producer(s): Magnetic Man

Magnetic Man singles chronology
"Perfect Stranger" (2010)	"Getting Nowhere" (2011)	"Anthemic" (2011)

John Legend singles chronology
"Hard Times" (2011)	"Getting Nowhere" (2011)	"When Christmas Comes" (2011)

"Getting Nowhere" is a song by English electronic music project Magnetic Man featuring American singer John Legend. It is the third single to be released from their debut album Magnetic Man. It was released on 18 February 2011. It only managed to peak to number 65 on the UK Singles Chart but had some success in Flanders where it reached number four. The song was also used in a Sony PlayStation Move advert in November 2011.

== Critical reception ==
Nick Levine of Digital Spy gave the song a positive review stating:

On which Artwork, Benga and Skream – the commanding triptych of Croydon clubland, if you will – team up with nine-time Grammy Award winner John Legend to reaffirm what the James Blake album has recently suggested – that dubstep can possess genuine gets-you-in-the-guts soul.

== Track listing ==
Digital download
No.	Title	Length
1.	"Getting Nowhere" (featuring John Legend)	4:30
2.	"Getting Nowhere (Skream Remix)" (featuring John Legend)	4:52
3.	"Getting Nowhere (Breakage As Hard As We Try Remix)" (featuring John Legend)	4:41
4.	"Getting Nowhere (Yoruba Soul Mix)" (featuring John Legend)	7:29
5.	"Getting Nowhere (Music Version)" (featuring John Legend)	3:47

12" vinyl
No.	Title	Length
1.	"Getting Nowhere" (Skream Remix) (featuring John Legend))	4:52
2.	"Getting Nowhere" (Breakage As Hard As We Try Remix) (featuring John Legend)	4:42
3.	"Getting Nowhere" (Original Mix) (featuring John Legend)	4:30

== Chart performance ==
Chart (2011)	Peak Position
Belgium (Ultratip Bubbling Under Flanders)	4
Belgium (Ultratip Bubbling Under Wallonia)	32
UK Singles (The Official Charts Company)	65

== Release history ==
Region	Date	Format	Label
United Kingdom	18 February 2011	12"; digital download	Sony
