= Youngman (MC) =

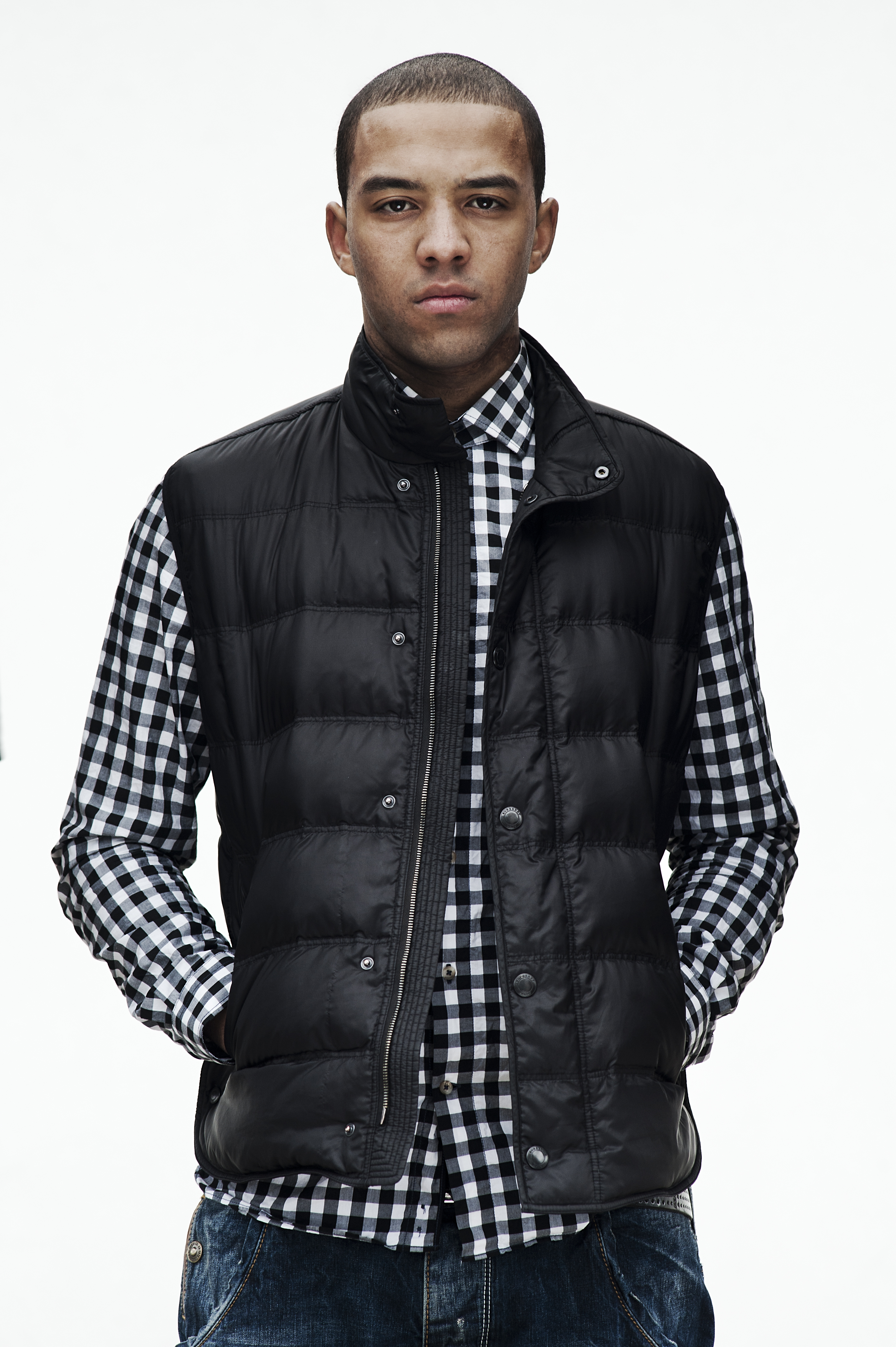
Youngman
- Born: Simon Smith
- Origin: Derby, Derbyshire, England
- Occupation: MC
- Labels: Digital Soundboy Records, Warner/Chappell Music, Technique Recordings
- Website: www.iamyoungman.com

Youngman (born Simon Smith) is a British urban MC and vocalist signed to Shy FX’s label Digital Soundboy Records. He has been awarded MistaJam’s Jam Hot, Zane Lowe’s Next Hype and Annie Mac’s record of the week.

Son of Simon “Bassline” Smith, Youngman grew up and lives in Derby in the East Midlands of England. He has been the MC and ‘hype man’ to the likes of Breakage, Skream, Benga, Shy FX and the Digital Soundboy family. In 2008 Youngman was runner-up in the Drum & Bass Awards Best Breakthrough MC category.

In 2010 Youngman took to the studio with Benga to record early releases including ‘One and Only’, ‘Ho’ and ‘Tear It Out’/’I Warned Ya’. His forthcoming album, ‘Me and My Music’ is a mixture of UK urban influences. Producers include Shy FX, Skream, Benga, MJ Cole, Breakage, Sam Frank and Kutz.

== Discography ==
Drumsound & Bassline Smith* Feat Youngman* - Steal My Heart (12") Liq-weed Ganja Recordings 2006

Crissy Criss & Youngman* - Kick Snare / Pimp Game V Records (2) 2009

Crissy Criss & Youngman* - Give You The World Part 3 Technique Recordings 2010

Ho / One & Only Digital Soundboy Recording Co. 2010

Crissy Criss & Youngman* - Take You Higher V Records (2) 2010

Drumsound & Bassline Smith* Ft. Youngman* - 10 Years Of Technique Part 6 Technique Recordings 2010

Crissy Criss & Youngman* - Turn It Up / Stop Technique Recordings 2010 Mark System* Feat Youngman* - The Hold It E.P. Digital Soundboy Recording Co. 2011

Tear It Out (CDr, Single) Digital Soundboy Recording Co. 2011
