= Jah No Partial =

Single by Major Lazer featuring Flux Pavilion

from the album Free the Universe
- Released: October 22, 2012
- Recorded: 2011
- Genre: Dancehall; post-dubstep; jungle
- Length: 4:13
- Label: Mad Decent; Downtown; V2; Cooperative; Secretly Canadian; Because
- Songwriters: Thomas Wesley Pentz; Joshua Steele; Errol Osbourne; Lloyd Woodrowe James
- Producers: Major Lazer; Flux Pavilion

Major Lazer singles chronology
"Get Free" (2012)	"Jah No Partial" (2012)	"Watch Out for This (Bumaye)" (2013)

Flux Pavilion singles chronology
"Daydreamer" (2012)	"Jah No Partial" (2012)	"Do or Die" (2013)

Music video
- "Jah No Partial" on YouTube

"Jah No Partial" is a song by musical project Major Lazer from their second studio album Free the Universe. The song was published worldwide on October 22, 2012, and released digitally in 2013. The song features English dubstep producer and DJ Flux Pavilion.

"Jah No Partial" contains excerpts of the Johnny Osbourne song "Mr. Marshall" (from his 1980s reggae album Folly Ranking), which the song is based on. It also contains a drum sample from James Brown's live cover of the Archie Bell & the Drells song "Tighten Up".

== Music video ==
The music video was uploaded to Major Lazer's Vevo channel on March 11, 2013. It was filmed by Shane McCauley and Aymen Ahmed, edited by Kyle DePinna, and was shot on location at the Pukkelpop Festival in Hasselt, Belgium, the Notting Hill Carnival in London, UK, and the Mad Decent Block Party in Philadelphia, Pennsylvania. Johnny Osbourne, whose vocals are sampled in the track, appears in the video's introduction while the members of Major Lazer (Diplo, Jillionaire and Walshy Fire) are seen arriving at the festival and performing. It features Diplo zorbing on the crowd and crowd surfing. British singer Rita Ora also appears in the video standing behind the decks.

== Track listing ==
UK promotional CD single

1. "Jah No Partial" (featuring Flux Pavilion) – 4:13

== Chart performance ==
The song reached number 59 on the Flanders Ultratip chart and number 39 on Belgium Dance chart.

Chart (2012–13)	Peak position
Belgium Dance (Ultratop Flanders)	39
Belgium (Ultratip Bubbling Under Flanders)	59

== Release history ==
Region	Date	Format	Label
United States	February 27, 2013	Digital download	Secretly Canadian; Mad Decent
Canada	February 27, 2013	Digital download	Secretly Canadian; Mad Decent
Australia	March 12, 2013	Digital download	Because
New Zealand	March 12, 2013	Digital download	Because
United Kingdom	March 29, 2013	Digital download	Because
