= Anthemic =

Single by Magnetic Man featuring P Money

from the album Magnetic Man
- Released: 22 July 2011
- Recorded: 2010–2011
- Genre: Dubstep; grime
- Length: 3:49
- Label: Sony
- Songwriters: Oliver Jones; Benga Adejumo
- Producer: Magnetic Man

Magnetic Man singles chronology
"Getting Nowhere" (2011)	"Anthemic" (2011)

P Money singles chronology
"Pow 2011" (2011)	"Anthemic" (2011)	"Dubsteppin" (2012)

"Anthemic" is a song by live electronic music project Magnetic Man. It is the fourth single to be released from the debut album Magnetic Man and was released as a digital download on 22 July 2011. For its release, grime rapper P Money was added to the track – with the version serving as the lead promotion for the release. The single version premiered in May 2011 during Magnetic Man's performance at BBC Radio 1's Big Weekend.

== Music video ==
A music video to accompany the release of "Anthemic" was first released onto YouTube on 30 June 2011 at a total length of three minutes and forty-nine seconds.

== Track listing ==
Digital download
No.	Title	Length
1.	"Anthemic" (featuring P Money)	3:49
2.	"Anthemic" (Faze Miyake Grime Remix) (featuring P Money)	3:45
3.	"Anthemic" (Bok Bok Remix) (featuring P Money)	4:16
4.	"Anthemic" (Lil Silva Remix) (featuring P Money)	4:51

== Charts ==
Chart (2011)	Peak position
UK Dance (Official Charts)	12
UK Singles (Official Charts)	50

== Release history ==
Region	Date	Format	Label
United Kingdom	22 July 2011	Digital download	Sony
