= Diary of an Afro Warrior =

Studio album by Benga
- Released: 2008
- Genre: Dubstep
- Length: 63:51
- Label: Tempa
- Producer: Benga

Benga chronology
Newstep (2006)	Diary of an Afro Warrior (2008)	Chapter II (2013)

Diary of an Afro Warrior is the second album by dubstep producer Benga. Released in 2008 it was met with favourable reviews and has been credited – along with fellow Tempa artist, Skream – with introducing the genre to a more mainstream audience.

Professional ratings
Review scores
Source	Rating
AllMusic	4.5/5 stars
The Observer	4/5 stars

== Track listing ==
No.	Title	Length
1.	"Zero M2"	3:53
2.	"Night" (with Coki)	5:56
3.	"B4 the Dual"	5:29
4.	"E Trips"	4:39
5.	"Someone 20"	4:16
6.	"Light Bulb"	4:20
7.	"Crunked Up"	3:39
8.	"Go Tell Them"	4:07
9.	"The Cut"	4:46
10.	"Emotions"	5:33
11.	"3 Minutes"	2:54
12.	"Pleasure"	5:15
13.	"26 Basslines"	5:02
14.	"Loose Synths"	4:08

=== Expanded Edition ===
No.	Title	Length
1.	"Out of Phaze"	4:40
2.	"Air"	4:11
3.	"Z"	5:10
4.	"Twister"	6:04
5.	"Tech Wobbler"	4:47

== In popular culture ==
Some critics have noted the similarity between the track 'Zero M2' and A Night in Tunisia by Dizzy Gillespie, as a likely tribute.
