= Stay Awake (Example song) =

2011 single by Example

Single by Example & Nero

from the album Playing in the Shadows
- Released: 28 August 2011
- Genre: Dubstep
- Length: 3:24
- Label: Ministry of Sound
- Songwriter: Example
- Producer: Nero

Example singles chronology
"Changed the Way You Kiss Me" (2011)	"Stay Awake" (2011)	"Natural Disaster" (2011)

"Stay Awake" is a song by British musician Example from his third studio album, Playing in the Shadows. The song was written by Example and produced by British electronic music trio Nero. It was released on 28 August 2011 as the album's second single and was added to the BBC Radio 1 playlist. The song premiered on BBC Radio 1 as Zane Lowe's 'Hottest Record in the World' on 4 July 2011. On 4 September 2011, the single debuted on the UK Singles Chart at number one.

== Background and release ==
Example told British online newspaper The Independent that his inspiration for the song was how kids at the time seemed to be engaging in drug use, alcohol consumption, and sex more often and at younger ages. Noticing other people did not discuss this subject in music, Example decided to do so himself. He then met up with Nero, who played several of their compositions for him, but they decided that the recording would not appeal to the public, so they wrote a new song with that quality. Nero commented that the final result was something that they would not do themselves, but it worked well for Example. "Stay Awake" was released in the United Kingdom on 28 August 2011.

== Critical reception ==
Stay Awake generally received a positive response upon its release. Robert Copsey of Digital Spy gave the song a 4/5 star rating and stated it is "the perfect pick-me-up for those on a post-festival comedown... and a harsh lesson for those who aren't.

== Chart performance ==
The song debuted at number one on the UK Singles Chart, marking his second number one and sixth top 40 hit. It sold 73,402 copies, beating "Moves like Jagger" by Maroon 5 featuring Christina Aguilera to the top spot by just 266 copies, the smallest gap between the top two in the UK since March 2009.

== Music video ==
A music video to accompany the release of the single "Stay Awake" was first released on YouTube on 18 July 2011. The video lasts 3 minutes and 30 seconds.

== Live performances ==
Example performed the song live at V Festival 2011 on the 4Music stage.

== Track listing ==
Digital download
No.	Title	Length
1.	"Stay Awake" (radio edit)	3:24
2.	"Stay Awake" (extended mix)	5:06
3.	"Stay Awake" (Alvin Risk remix)	5:29
4.	"Stay Awake" (Delta Heavy remix)	4:36
5.	"Stay Awake" (Steve Pitron & Max Sanna club mix)	6:02
6.	"Stay Awake" (Micky Slim remix)	5:39
7.	"Stay Awake" (Moám remix)	6:09

== Charts ==
=== Weekly charts ===
Chart (2011)	Peak position
Belgium (Ultratip Bubbling Under Flanders)	29
Belgium (Ultratip Bubbling Under Wallonia)	9
Belgium Dance (Ultratop Flanders)	38
Belgium Dance (Ultratop Wallonia)	16
Ireland (IRMA)	18
Scottish Singles Sales (Official Charts)	2
Slovakia Airplay (ČNS IFPI)	96
UK Singles (Official Charts)	1
UK Dance (Official Charts)	1
UK Indie (Official Charts)	1

=== Year-end charts ===
Chart (2011)	position
UK Singles (OCC)	96

== Certifications ==
Region	Certification	Certified units/sales
United Kingdom (BPI)	Gold	400,000^{‡}
^{‡} Sales+streaming figures based on certification alone.

== Release history ==
Region	Date	Label	Format
United Kingdom	28 August 2011	Ministry of Sound	Digital download; CD single; vinyl
Australia	9 September 2011	Ministry of Sound	Digital download; CD single; vinyl
