= Perfect Stranger (Magnetic Man song) =

Single by Magnetic Man featuring Katy B

from the album Magnetic Man and On a Mission
- Released: 1 October 2010
- Recorded: 2010
- Genre: Drum and bass
- Length: 5:56 (Magnetic Man version); 3:13 (On a Mission version)
- Label: Columbia
- Songwriter(s): Benga Adejumo; Oliver Jones; Arthur Smith; Katie Brien
- Producer(s): Magnetic Man

Magnetic Man singles chronology
"I Need Air" (2010)	"Perfect Stranger" (2010)	"Getting Nowhere" (2011)

Katy B singles chronology
"Katy on a Mission" (2010)	"Perfect Stranger" (2010)	"Lights On" (2010)

"Perfect Stranger" is a song by British electronic music project Magnetic Man featuring singer Katy B. It is the second single to be released from their debut album Magnetic Man and can also be found on Katy B's debut album On a Mission. It was released on 1 October 2010. It peaked at number 16 on the UK Singles Chart.

== Background ==
In an interview with The Guardian they said: "We worked on this song for two weeks to get the original version perfect. Then Benga does a remix that's absolutely amazing. I think it's testament to his talent that he can live so closely with a track and then do something completely different with it."

== Critical reception ==
Nick Levine of Digital Spy gave the song a positive review stating:

Songs about spotting a proper fitty on the dancefloor and getting in a right old tizzy about it are as rare as OK! covers featuring Katie Price. Still, if anyone can eek fresh juice out of this well-squeezed lyrical lemon, it's the combined talents of a dubstep supergroup and the hippest pop singer in Croydon town, right?

Well, yes, actually. The cut-above club pop of 'Perfect Stranger' is simultaneously stately and spacious, with production that manages to sound clattering without feeling cluttered, and the vocals of Katy "No relation to Mel!" B are just as enchanting as they were when she went 'On A Mission' recently. It all adds up to our favourite song about love at first sight since Kylie chirped "Baby when I heard you..." Right, time for a new iTunes playlist.

== Track listing ==
Digital download
No.	Title	Length
1.	"Perfect Stranger" (featuring Katy B)	5:58
2.	"Perfect Stranger (Benga remix)" (featuring Katy B)	4:40
3.	"Perfect Stranger (Steve Angello remix)" (featuring Katy B)	6:42

== 12" vinyl ==
12" vinyl
No.	Title	Length
1.	"Perfect Stranger" (Album Version) (featuring Katy B)	5:56
2.	"Perfect Stranger" (Benga Remix) (featuring Katy B)	4:42

== Chart performance ==
Chart (2010)	Peak position
Belgium (Ultratip Bubbling Under Flanders)	13
Belgium (Ultratip Bubbling Under Wallonia)	28
Scotland (OCC)	29
UK Singles (OCC)	16

== Release history ==
Region	Date	Format	Label
United Kingdom	1 October 2010	Digital download	Columbia
United Kingdom	4 October 2010	12"	Columbia
