= Michael Woods (DJ) =

English producer & DJ

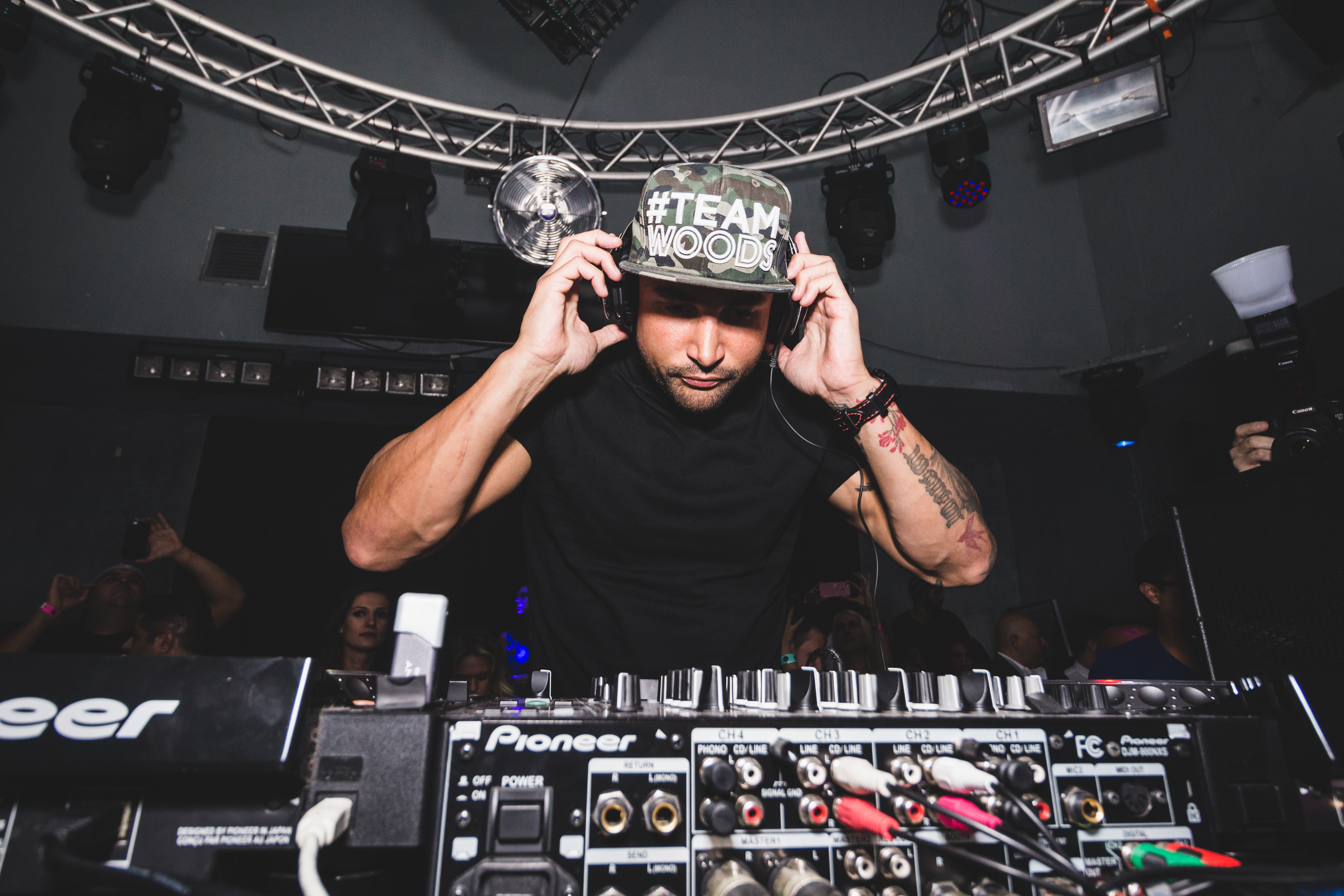
- Woods at Sutra in California, 2015

Background information
- Also known as: Michael Woods, Out of Office, Warrior, Accadia, M1, M3
- Born: Michael Anthony Woods
- Origin: London, England
- Genres: Progressive house, electro house, trance, progressive trance
- Occupations: Musician, DJ, music producer, remixer
- Instruments: Keyboards, mixer, synthesizer
- Years active: 1999–present
- Labels: Diffused Music, Rising Music, mau5trap, Ministry of Sound, Toolroom Records
- Website: michaelwoods.co.uk

Michael Anthony Woods is an English producer, DJ and remixer of various EDM genres, mainly progressive house, electro house and trance. He is the founder of the imprint label Diffused Music, which was established in 2010 and focuses primarily on progressive house and tech house. He has worked under the stage names of Out of Office, Warrior, Accadia, M1 and M3.

== Biography ==
Initially known as Warrior, Michael Woods had his first hits in 2000 with the debut single "Warrior" and the follow-up "Voodoo". "Warrior" achieved a No. 1 ranking in the UK Club Chart, and also did well in the top 40, entering at No. 19. "Voodoo" also reached top 40. He also released ambient trance singles on Lost Language under the name Accadia.

Woods became widely known for the songs "If U Want Me" (2003), featuring Australian model Imogen Bailey, and "Solex (Close to the Edge)" (2003), featuring vocals by Juliette Jaimes, known best for her Holly Valance cover, "Kiss Kiss" (2002). Both of these singles also had an associated music video. They peaked on the UK Singles Chart at No. 46 and No. 52 respectively.

Michael Woods' sister, Marcella Woods, is also a singer, known for her co-operations with Matt Darey on "Beautiful", "Liberation" and "U Shine On". Her vocals also appear on "So Special" (2005), which was the result of co-operation between Michael Woods and Judge Jules. She has also joined Michael with Out of Office and released their second single, "Break of Dawn", to follow up the 2007 single, "Hands Up".

Michael produced the track "Changed the Way You Kiss Me" for singer & rapper Example which debuted at No.1 in the UK singles charts in June 2011.

Michael Woods is currently operating under the project name "Offaiah", which is a play on the words "All" and "Fire".

== Discography ==
=== Singles ===
List of singles, with selected chart positions
Title	Year	Peak chart positions	
Title	Year	UK	AUS
"If U Want Me" (featuring Imogen Bailey)	2003	46	62
"Solex (Close to the Edge)"	2003	52	—
"So Special" (with Judge Jules)	2005	82	—

=== Remixes ===
- 1995 Matt Darey Presents Lost Tribe - Gamemaster (Michael Woods Remix)
- 1999 Solarstone - Seven Cities (Michael Woods Remix)
- 2000 Salt Tank - Eugina (Michael Woods Remix)
- 2000 Xstasia - Sweetness (Michael Woods Remix)
- 2000 666 - D.E.V.I.L (Michael Woods Remix)
- 2000 Tillman & Ries - Bassfly (Michael Woods Remix)
- 2002 Ian Van Dahl - Try (Michael Woods Remix)
- 2003 Candee Jay - If I Were You (Michael Woods Extended Remix)
- 2005 Energy 52 - Café Del Mar (Michael Woods Remix)
- 2009 The Ting Tings - Hands (Michael Woods Remix)
- 2010 Moguai - Oyster (Michael Woods Remix)
- 2010 The Temper Trap - Science Of Fear (Michael Woods Remix)
- 2010 La Roux - In For The Kill (Michael Woods Remix)
- 2010 Marting Solveig - Hello (Michael Woods Remix)
- 2011 Clashback - Outset (Michael Woods Remix)
- 2011 Deadmau5 - I Said (Michael Woods Remix)
- 2011 Underworld - Always Loved A Film (Michael Woods Remix)
- 2012 Tiësto & Mark Knight feat Dino - Beautiful World (Michael Woods Remix)
- 2012 Marina & The Diamonds - Power & Control (Michael Woods Remix)
- 2012 Calvin Harris feat. Example - We'll Be Coming Back (Michael Woods Remix)
