= Mary Anne Hobbs =

British DJ known for association with dubstep music

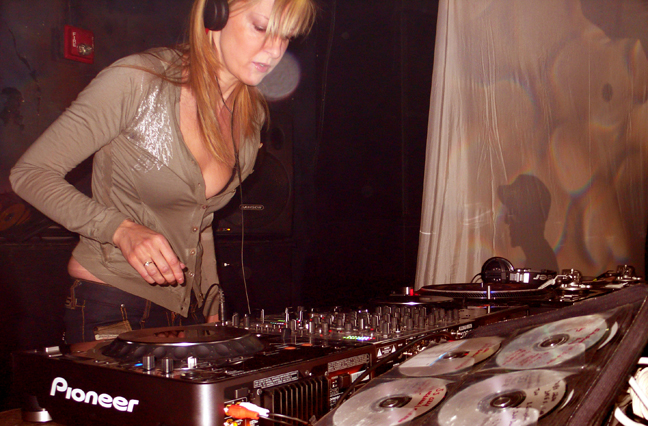
- Hobbs DJing in 2008
- Born: 16 May 1964 (age 62); Preston, Lancashire, England
- Spouse: Miles Hunt (1990–95)
- Presenting career
- Show: Mary Anne Hobbs
- Station: BBC Radio 6 Music
- Style: DJ (experimental)
- Country: United Kingdom

Mary Anne Hobbs (born 16 May 1964) is an English DJ and music journalist from Lancashire, England. She currently hosts on BBC Radio 6 Music. She is also a performer and curator of live events. In 2024 she created a ground-breaking collaboration with violinist Anna Phoebe for the 6 Music Festival. She's hosted the ALL QUEENS stage at All Points East festival for 4 years. In 2019, she created a radical live show, Queens of the Electronic Underground for Manchester International Festival and assisted David Lynch with his musical presentation at the festival, following her series of shows, "Dark Matter" at MIF 2017. She staged a BBC Prom with Nils Frahm and A Winged Victory for the Sullen in 2015. She performs as a live DJ internationally, at events such as the opening of Switch House at Tate Modern and the Tate Britain re-hang celebrations in 2023.

== Early life ==
Hobbs was born in Preston, Lancashire but grew up in Garstang, a small town 10 miles to the north. In the 1980s, Hobbs lived on a bus in a carpark in Hayes, Hillingdon, with the hard rock band Heretic before becoming a journalist for Sounds magazine at the age of 19. She later went to work for the NME writing the notorious Nirvana cover story of 1991. She married Miles Hunt of the band The Wonder Stuff in 1990; they were married for five years.

== Career ==
Hobbs then worked at XFM before being headhunted by BBC Radio 1 after a confrontational interview on XFM with Radio 1's Trevor Dann. She shot a TV series about global biker culture, Mary Anne's Bikes, in Japan, America, Russia, India, and Europe for BBC Choice & BBC World in 2003, and presented the World Superbikes series 2005 for British Eurosport. She also compèred the Leeds Festival between 1999 and 2003. In the early 2000s she narrated the CBBC science series Why 5.

=== Radio shows ===
Hobbs first joined Radio 1 in January 1996, as co-presenter of the weekly Clingfilm movie review show with Mark Kermode. A fan of punk and rock (and with a love of motorbikes) from an early age, she fronted the Radio 1 Rock Show 1999–2005. But her best loved show on BBC Radio 1 was the experimental / electronic show The Breezeblock she created during her fourteen years at the network. In September 2006 The Breezeblock name was dropped for the title Experimental. Hobbs was an early champion of the dubstep and grime genres and hosted the 'Dubstep Warz' special on BBC Radio 1 in January 2006.

On 23 July 2010, Hobbs announced on her MySpace page that she was leaving BBC Radio 1. She spent a year mentoring media students at the University of Sheffield Union of Students.

On 9 July 2011, Hobbs returned to radio in the primetime slot (7 – 10 pm Saturdays) she had always coveted for electronic music, broadcasting from XFM in Manchester. In September 2011 she began hosting the relaunched "Music:Response" evening show across the XFM network. On 31 October 2012, she announced live on-air and on her Facebook page that she was leaving XFM the following day.

On 3 December 2012, the BBC announced that Hobbs was to become the new Weekend Breakfast presenter for BBC Radio 6 Music.

In 2013 and 2014 she made documentaries for BBC Radio 4, and hosted Saturday Classics programmes for BBC Radio 3 making the connections between contemporary and classical music.

On 9 August 2018, the BBC announced that Hobbs was moving to weekday mid-mornings, replacing Lauren Laverne. Hobbs' first show in this slot was on 7 January 2019.

=== Live DJing ===
Hobbs has toured as a live DJ and curated events internationally since 2006. In June 2007, Hobbs curated the UK Dubstep showcase at the Sónar festival with Skream and Kode9, taking the sound out of club environments and onto an international festival stage in front of 8,500 people. Her second Sonar showcase featured Shackleton, Flying Lotus and Mala from Digital Mystikz. In 2009 she returned to the festival with Joker and The Gaslamp Killer, and in 2010 again with Flying Lotus and Joy Orbison. In 2011 she played solo to her biggest ever audience of 15,000 people at Sonar, and in 2012 she created a one-off collaborative Descent into Darkness performance with techno producer Blawan. She returned solo in 2013 for the festival's 20th anniversary.

=== Other ===
Hobbs owns an original Banksy, given to her by the artist for her birthday in the year 2000. It is an early prototype of his piece ‘Love Is In The Air’ and is currently on display at Manchester Art Gallery.

== Discography ==
Hobbs released a dark electronic, compilation album on Planet Mu records entitled Warrior Dubz in October 2006, drawing the sonic parallels between dubstep, grime, dark dancefloor, techno, d&b and hip hop. She followed this with two more compilations: Evangeline in June 2008 and Wild Angels in September 2009.

=== Soundtracks ===
Darren Aronofsky and Clint Mansell invited Hobbs to work with them on the soundtrack for the Oscar-winning film Black Swan. She worked with young electronic producers to create original music for the pivotal club scenes. The soundtrack was Grammy Award nominated.

Hobbs is mentioned in the Half Man Half Biscuit song "Nove on the Sly" from the album Trouble Over Bridgwater.
