= Changed the Way You Kiss Me =

2011 single by Example

Single by Example

from the album Playing in the Shadows
- Released: 5 June 2011
- Recorded: 2010
- Genre: Electro house; trance; Eurodance; hip house
- Length: 3:12
- Label: Ministry of Sound
- Songwriters: Elliot Gleave; Michael Woods
- Producer: Woods

Example singles chronology
"Unorthodox" (2011)	"Changed the Way You Kiss Me" (2011)	"Stay Awake" (2011)

"Changed the Way You Kiss Me" is a song by British singer Example from his third studio album, Playing in the Shadows. It was released on 5 June 2011 as the album's lead single, after it had premiered on BBC Radio 1 as Zane Lowe's 'Hottest Record in the World' on 24 March 2011. The song was written by Example with Michael Woods, who also produced it. An official remix featuring American rapper Ludacris was made available to mainstream radio in the United States on 1 May 2012.

The song debuted at number-one on the UK Singles Chart, selling over 115,000 copies. With 582,000 copies sold in 2011 alone, the track finished as the year's seventeenth biggest seller and in January 2012 was nominated at the 2012 BRIT Awards. In 2017, the background music was being used for McDonald's advertising.

== Music video ==
A music video to accompany the release of the single, "Changed the Way You Kiss Me", was first released on YouTube on 21 April 2011. The video lasts 3 minutes and 15 seconds long. The video contains real fans from the street and was filmed in the Ministry of Sound club in London.

== Critical reception ==
Lewis Corner of Digital Spy gave the song a positive review stating:

In a chart climate dominated with emotional balladry from Adele one minute and thumping feel-good club-pop from LMFAO the song runs through trance beats with eurodance elements the next, an artist can be forgiven for feeling a little confused about where the current music scene is headed and thus how to create a bona-fide hit that will send them straight to the top. That said, Fulham-born Example may just have the answer with this trailer from his forthcoming LP..

== Track listings ==
Digital download
No.	Title	Length
1.	"Changed the Way You Kiss Me" (Radio Edit)	3:15
2.	"Changed the Way You Kiss Me" (Extended Mix)	5:30
3.	"Changed the Way You Kiss Me" (Steve Smart & Westfunk Club Mix)	5:34
4.	"Changed the Way You Kiss Me" (Tom Staar Remix)	5:24
5.	"Changed the Way You Kiss Me" (Mensah Remix)	5:34

United States digital download
No.	Title	Length
1.	"Changed the Way You Kiss Me" (Chuckie Edit)	3:38
2.	"Changed the Way You Kiss Me" (Chuckie Extended Mix)	6:24
3.	"Changed the Way You Kiss Me" (Chuckie Instrumental)	6:23
4.	"Changed the Way You Kiss Me" (Mixin Marc & Tony Svejda Edit)	3:52
5.	"Changed the Way You Kiss Me" (Mixin Marc & Tony Svejda Mixshow)	5:40
6.	"Changed the Way You Kiss Me" (Mixin Marc & Tony Svejda Extended Mix)	6:25
7.	"Changed the Way You Kiss Me" (Mixin Marc & Tony Svejda Instrumental)	6:23
8.	"Changed the Way You Kiss Me" (Mixin Marc & Tony Svejda Peak House Dub)	5:36
9.	"Changed the Way You Kiss Me" (DJ Reflex Edit)	3:47
10.	"Changed the Way You Kiss Me" (DJ Reflex Extended Mix)	4:57
11.	"Changed the Way You Kiss Me" (DJ Reflex Instrumental)	4:37
12.	"Changed the Way You Kiss Me" (Black Cards Remix)	5:39

United States CD single
No.	Title	Length
1.	"Changed the Way You Kiss Me" (featuring Ludacris)	3:28
2.	"Changed the Way You Kiss Me" (Instrumental Edit)	3:15

== Charts and certifications ==
=== Chart performance ===
"Changed the Way You Kiss Me" saw great success in the United Kingdom, where it debuted at number-one for the week ending 18 June 2011 – the first of Example's releases to achieve this feat – and remained at the top for two weeks. The single made its chart debut in Ireland on 9 June 2011, when it entered at number 6. On its second week on the chart, the single climbed a single place to number 5. On its fifth week, it reached number 3; marking Example's highest-charting single in the country. With sales of 115,046, the single also topped the dance chart and independent chart. The song also charted in Australia, Austria, Belgium, Denmark, Germany, France, Finland, Ireland, New Zealand, Slovakia, Switzerland and Poland. This marks Example's most successful single to date. The song has sold 582,000 copies in 2011.

=== Weekly charts ===
Chart (2011–2012)	Peak position
Australia (ARIA)	16
Australian Dance (ARIA)	4
Australian Club Chart (ARIA)	1
Austria (Ö3 Austria Top 40)	33
Belgium (Ultratop 50 Flanders)	37
Belgium (Ultratop 50 Wallonia)	30
CIS Airplay (TopHit)	13
Czech Republic Airplay (ČNS IFPI)	22
Denmark (Tracklisten)	16
France (SNEP)	37
Finland (Suomen virallinen lista)	15
Germany (GfK)	8
Hungary (Dance Top 40)	12
Hungary (Rádiós Top 40)	14
Ireland (IRMA)	3
Mexico Ingles Airplay (Billboard)	50
New Zealand (Recorded Music NZ)	12
Poland (Dance Top 50)	32
Poland (Video Chart)	2
Russia Airplay (TopHit)	9
Scottish Singles Sales (Official Charts)	1
Slovakia Airplay (ČNS IFPI)	38
Switzerland (Schweizer Hitparade)	20
UK Dance (Official Charts)	1
UK Indie (Official Charts)	1
UK Singles (Official Charts)	1
US Hot Dance Club Songs (Billboard)	13

=== Year-end charts ===
2011 year-end chart performance for "Changed the Way You Kiss Me"
Chart (2011)	Position
Australia (ARIA)	82
Germany (Media Control AG)	81
UK Singles (OCC)	17

2012 year-end chart performance for "Changed the Way You Kiss Me"
Chart (2012)	Position
Russia Airplay (TopHit)	31

2013 year-end chart performance for "Changed the Way You Kiss Me"
Chart (2013)	Position
Russia Airplay (TopHit)	175

=== Certifications ===
Region	Certification	Certified units/sales
Australia (ARIA)	Platinum	70,000^{^}
Germany (BVMI)	Gold	150,000^{‡}
United Kingdom (BPI)	2× Platinum	1,200,000^{‡}
^{^} Shipments figures based on certification alone.^{‡} Sales+streaming figures based on certification alone.

== Release history ==
Region	Date	Label	Format
United Kingdom	5 June 2011	Ministry of Sound	Digital download
Ireland	5 June 2011	Ministry of Sound	Digital download
Australia	24 June 2011	Ministry of Sound	Digital download
New Zealand	24 June 2011	Ministry of Sound	Digital download
Belgium	1 August 2011	Ministry of Sound	Digital download
Denmark	1 August 2011	Ministry of Sound	Digital download
Austria	6 September 2011	Ministry of Sound	Digital download
Germany	6 September 2011	Ministry of Sound	Digital download
Finland	6 September 2011	Ministry of Sound	Digital download
Switzerland	6 September 2011	Ministry of Sound	Digital download
United States	29 May 2012	Island Def Jam	Digital download
