= Natural Disaster (Example song) =

Single by Laidback Luke vs. Example

from the album Playing in the Shadows
- Released: 16 October 2011
- Genre: Dance; house; trance
- Length: 3:00 (Radio Edit); 3:45 (Single Version); 5:10 (Album Version); 5:50 (Extended Radio Edit); 7:10 (Extended Club Mix)
- Label: Ministry of Sound
- Songwriters: Example; Laidback Luke; Dipesh Parmar
- Producer: Laidback Luke

Laidback Luke singles chronology
"Better Off Alone (Laidback Luke Remix)" (2011)	"Natural Disaster" (2011)

Example singles chronology
"Stay Awake" (2011)	"Natural Disaster" (2011)	"Midnight Run" (2011)

"Natural Disaster" is a song by Dutch DJ Laidback Luke and British singer and rapper Example. It was released on 4 October 2011 in the US and on 16 October 2011 in the UK as the third single of Example's third studio album, Playing in the Shadows, with an entire remix EP on iTunes. A 5-minute extended explicit album version of the song was included on the album Playing in the Shadows. The song was written by Example, Laidback Luke, and Dipesh Parmar, and was produced by Laidback Luke.

== Music video ==
A music video was first released on YouTube on 14 September 2011. In the video there is a teenage boy who argues with his parents, he goes to his room. Later on he goes outside and waits on the corner of a sidewalk. Another man walks past and gives the teenager a memory stick which says Laidback Luke on it. He takes the memory stick home and plugs it into his computer and loads music by Laidback Luke. He puts on earphones and listens to the music, it causes him to become delirious, his parents walk in on him and take the memory stick off him. The memory stick in the video is supposed to resemble illegal drugs that the boy is taking. After his parents took the memory stick the boy goes outside and waits on the sidewalk again. When the same man comes past again the boy asks for another memory stick, the man says no this time as the boy appears to have no money. He then starts crying in the middle of the road, he then hears the echoing of music being played by Laidback Luke, he follows the sound and it leads him to a club. He enters the club (for free) and starts getting high off the music again. In the video it also cuts to shots of Example singing.

== Track listing ==
Digital download –
No.	Title	Length
1.	"Natural Disaster" (UK Radio Edit)	2:59
2.	"Natural Disaster" (Andy C Remix)	5:30
3.	"Natural Disaster" (Skream Remix)	4:52
4.	"Natural Disaster" (Benny Benassi Remix)	5:20
5.	"Natural Disaster" (Nouveau Yorican Remix)	7:33
6.	"Natural Disaster" (Laidback Luke Extended Vocal Remix)	6:57
7.	"Natural Disaster" (Instrumental Extended)	6:57

Digital download – remixes
No.	Title	Length
1.	"Natural Disaster" (Judge Jules Dub)	7:49
2.	"Natural Disaster" (GTA 'WarCry' Remix)	5:52
3.	"Natural Disaster" (Revero Remix)	7:18

== Chart performance ==
Chart (2011)	Peak position
Belgium (Ultratip Bubbling Under Flanders)	49
Czech Republic Airplay (ČNS IFPI)	51
Slovakia Airplay (ČNS IFPI)	31
Scotland Singles (OCC)	35
UK Dance (OCC)	7
UK Indie (OCC)	4
UK Singles (OCC)	37

== Release history ==
Region	Date	Label	Format
UK	16 October 2011	Ministry of Sound	Digital Download
