= Shot Yourself in the Foot Again =

Song by Skream and Example

from the album Playing in the Shadows
- Released: 13 January 2011
- Recorded: 2010
- Genre: Dubstep
- Length: 3:43 (Radio Edit); 5:05 (Extended Mix)
- Label: Ministry of Sound
- Songwriter(s): Oliver Jones; Elliot Gleave
- Producer(s): Skream

"Shot Yourself in the Foot Again" is a song by British electronic music producer Skream and British singer Example. It was released through Ministry Of Sound as a free download on 13 January 2011. The song premiered on 4 January 2011 on Zane Lowe's radio show as his Hottest Record In The World. It was also played by Annie Mac on her radio show hours later. MistaJam then premiered the song on BBC Radio 1Xtra on 5 January. The music video, directed by Example himself along with the Chambers Brothers, has gained over 15 million views on YouTube. The song is included on Example's third studio album Playing in the Shadows as a bonus track on iTunes. Although initially being a free download, it managed to chart in the UK after being released on the album, peaking at number 82 on the UK Singles Chart.

== Track listing ==
No.	Title	Length
1.	"Shot Yourself in the Foot Again" (Radio Edit)	3:43
2.	"Shot Yourself in the Foot Again" (Extended Mix)	5:05

== Chart performance ==
Chart (2011–12)	Peak position
UK Dance (OCC)	21
UK Indie (OCC)	14
UK Singles (OCC)	82
