= Superbad (song) =

Single by Flux Pavilion and Doctor P
- Released: 9 December 2011
- Recorded: 2010
- Genre: Dubstep
- Length: 3:42
- Label: Circus Records, Big Beat Records

Flux Pavilion singles chronology
"Jump Back" (2011)	"Superbad" (2011)	"Daydreamer" (2012)

"Superbad" is a song by the English dubstep producers Flux Pavilion and Doctor P. The song was released in the United Kingdom on 9 December 2011 for digital download. The single peaked at number 61 on the UK Singles Chart and number 7 on the UK Dance Chart.

== Music video ==
A music video to accompany the release of "Superbad" was first released onto YouTube on 13 December 2011 at a total length of three minutes and forty-seven seconds.

== Track listings ==
Digital download
No.	Title	Length
1.	"Superbad"	3:42

== Chart performance ==
Chart (2011)	Peak position
UK Dance (Official Charts)	7
UK Singles (The Official Charts Company)	61

== Release history ==
Region	Date	Format	Label
United Kingdom	9 December 2011	Digital download	Warner Music
