= Doctor P =

Background information
- Also known as: Picto, Slum Dogz, Sounds Destructive
- Born: Shaun Brockhurst; 9 April 1986 (age 40)
- Origin: Towcester, England, United Kingdom
- Genres: Dubstep; drum and bass; glitch hop; moombahton; moombahcore
- Occupations: Producer, DJ
- Instruments: Music sequencer, sampler, synthesiser, drum machine, personal computer, turntables
- Years active: 2008–present
- Labels: Circus; Big Beat; Atlantic
- Website: www.doctorp.co.uk

Doctor P is the stage name of the English dubstep producer and DJ, Shaun Brockhurst (born 9 April 1986). Brockhurst has also produced drum and bass under the aliases Sounds Destructive (with Zachary Kemp, currently known as Trolley Snatcha), Slum Dogz (with DJ Swan-E and Krafty MC) and DJ Picto (or simply Picto). Some of his songs, including "Sweet Shop", "Tetris", "Big Boss", "Watch Out" and the remixes of Example's "Last Ones Standing" and Plan B's "Love Goes Down" have all received more than 5 million views on YouTube. He is the co-founder of Circus Records, along with Flux Pavilion, DJ Swan-E and Earl Falconer.

His collaboration with Adam F and Method Man, "The Pit", was used in a trailer for the 2014 American comedy film Let's Be Cops.

In a February 2013 interview, Brockhurst said he was working on a second track with Eva Simons (the first being "Bulletproof").

Flux Pavilion is his childhood friend.

== Origin of name ==
Since the letter "P" does not appear in Brockhurst's name, it can be puzzling as to where his alias comes from. In an interview, Doctor P stated that the "P" in his name stands for Picto, which was a nickname of his. It came from a predictive text suggestion that popped up when his name was typed (furthermore, one of his friends, following that, called him "Doctor Picto").

== Discography ==
=== Releases ===
- "Air Raid" (with Flux Pavilion) [Circus, 21 September 2009]
- "Rasputins Gold" [Circus, 30 November 2009]
- "Sweet Shop" / "Gargoyle" [Circus, 4 February 2010]
- "Stinkfinger" (with Flux Pavilion) [XS Dubz, April 2010]
- "Sweet Shop" (Radio Edit) [Circus, 4 June 2010]
- "Badman Sound" [Dub Police, 28 June 2010]
- "Vampire Dub" [Circus, 9 August 2010]
- "Sweet Shop" (Come Follow Me Mix) (Doctor P vs. P Money) [Circus, 23 August 2010]
- "Sweet Shop" (Flux Pavilion Remix) [Circus, 23 August 2010]
- "Sweet Shop" (Friction vs. Camo & Krooked DnB Mix) [Circus, 4 October 2010]
- "Big Boss" / "Black Books (featuring RSK)" [Circus, 8 November 2010]
- "Watch Out" [Circus, 2011]
- Circus One (presented by Doctor P & Flux Pavilion) [Circus / UKF, 1 May 2011]
- "Tetris Theme" [Circus, 13 June 2011] (UK chart peak: #185)
- "Superbad" (with Flux Pavilion) [Circus / Big Beat / Warner Music, 13 December 2011]
- "Neon" (featuring Jenna G) [Circus, 13 January 2012]
- "Music Is Dead" (with Dillon Francis) [Circus, 11 June 2012]
- "Galaxies & Stars" (featuring Ce'Cile) [Circus / Big Beat, 2012]
- "Bulletproof" (featuring Eva Simons) [Circus / Big Beat, 2012]
- Animal Vegetable Mineral - Part 1 [Circus / Big Beat / Warner Music, 30 August 2012]
- Flying Spaghetti Monster [Atlantic Records UK, 14 September 2012]
- "The Champagne Böp" [Circus / Big Beat, 24 June 2013]
- "The Pit" (with Adam F featuring Method Man) [Circus, 28 October 2013]
- "Shishkabob" [Free Download via Mixmag, 3 December 2013]
- "The Sound of Science" [Circus, 24 March 2014]
- "Going Gorillas" [Circus, 30 June 2014]
- "Going Gorillas (Doctor P's Bananas Remix)" [Circus, 5 April 2015]
- "Bubblehead" [Circus, 21 August 2015]
- "Alphabet Soup" (with Cookie Monsta featuring Messinian) [Circus, 16 October 2015]
- "Business" (featuring Far East Movement) [Circus, 27 November 2015]
- "Take Me Away" [Circus, 29 January 2016]
- "Party Drink Smoke" (with Flux Pavilion) [Circus, 28 April 2016]
- "Rekt Together" (Every Single Night) [Circus, 24 June 2016]
- "Show Me Love" / "Snakes & Ladders" [Circus, 9 September 2016]
- "Serious Sound" / "Pizza!" [Circus, 14 March 2017]
- "Somebody Scream" [Circus, 1 May 2018]
- "Something To Believe In" [Circus, 16 November 2018]
- Animal Vegetable Mineral - Part 2 [Circus, 6 March 2020]

=== Remixes ===
- Britney Spears - "3" (Doctor P Remix) [≤ 19 December 2009]
- Dan Le Sac vs Scroobius Pip - "Sick Tonight" (Doctor P Remix) [Sunday Best Recordings, 31 May 2010]
- 12th Planet - "Reasons" (Doctor P Remix) [8 June 2010]
- Caspa - "Marmite" (Doctor P Remix) [Sub Soldiers, 12 July 2010]
- Example - "Last Ones Standing" (Doctor P Remix) [12 September 2010]
- Fenech-Soler - "Lies" (Doctor P Remix) [18 September 2010]
- Fenech-Soler - "Lies" (Doctor P Dub) [18 September 2010]
- Plan B - "Love Goes Down" (Doctor P Remix) [≈ 12 November 2010]
- Plan B - "Love Goes Down" (Doctor P Dub Remix) [≈ 12 November 2010]
- Plan B - "Love Goes Down" (Doctor P Remix Edit) [≈ 12 November 2010]
- Blame - "Star" (Doctor P No Rap Remix) [5 December 2010]
- Blame - "Star" (Doctor P Remix) [5 December 2010]
- Blame - "Star" (Doctor P Instrumental Remix) [5 December 2010]
- DJ Fresh featuring Sian Evans - "Louder" (Flux Pavilion & Doctor P Remix) [3 July 2011]
- Scroobius Pip - "The Struggle" (Doctor P Remix) [≤ 30 October 2011]
- Krome & Time - "The License" (Doctor P Remix) [20 July 2012]
- Ed Sheeran - "Drunk" (Doctor P Remix)
- Boy Kid Cloud - "How It Looks" (Doctor P's Cheeky VIP)
- Roksonix - "Music in Me" (Doctor P Remix)
- Brown & Gammon - "Dark Matter" (Doctor P & Mizuki Remix)
- Dillon Francis featuring Totally Enormous Extinct Dinosaurs - "Without You" (Doctor P & Flux Pavilion Remix)
- Datsik featuring Georgia Murray - "Hold It Down" (Doctor P Remix)
- Robots Can't Dance - "Bada Bing" (Flux Pavilion & Doctor P Remix)
- RSK - "Black Books" (Doctor P Remix)
- Zomboy featuring Bok Nero - "Rotten" (Doctor P Remix)
