= Lines in Wax =

EP by Flux Pavilion
- Released: 11 October 2010
- Genre: Dubstep, hip hop
- Length: 20:29
- Label: Circus
- Producer: Joshua "Flux Pavilion" Steele

Flux Pavilion chronology
Lines in Wax (2010)	Blow the Roof (2013)

Lines in Wax is the debut EP by the English dubstep artist, Flux Pavilion. It was released on 11 October 2010 through Circus Records.

The third track, "I Can't Stop", was sampled by Kanye West and Jay-Z on "Who Gon Stop Me" from Watch the Throne, and featured in the Kony 2012 film. The original song entered the UK Singles Chart at number 115 on 17 March 2012.

== Track listing ==
All tracks are written by Joshua "Flux Pavilion" Steele

No.	Title	Length
1.	"Lines in Wax" (featuring Foreign Beggars)	5:17
2.	"Hold Me Close"	4:36
3.	"I Can't Stop"	5:03
4.	"Haunt You"	5:31
