= Magnetic Man (album) =

Studio album by Magnetic Man
- Released: 8 October 2010
- Recorded: 4 January–30 July 2010
- Genres: Dubstep; drum and bass; breakbeat hardcore
- Length: 62:14
- Labels: Startime; Columbia
- Producer: Magnetic Man

Singles from Magnetic Man
- 1. "I Need Air" Released: 23 July 2010; 2. "Perfect Stranger" Released: 1 October 2010; 3. "Getting Nowhere" Released: 18 February 2011; 4. "Anthemic" Released: 22 July 2011

Professional ratings
Aggregate scores
Source	Rating
Metacritic	(68/100)
Review scores
Source	Rating
AllMusic	3.5/5 stars
The Observer	(mixed)
Pitchfork Media	(5.9/10)
Prefix Magazine	(8.0/10)
Uncut	3/5 stars
Rolling Stone	3/5 stars
MusicOMH	3.5/5 stars
Resident Advisor	3.5/5 stars
Mojo	4/5 stars
The Guardian	4/5 stars
Consequence of Sound	4/5 stars
PopMatters	7/10 stars
NME	8/10 stars
No Ripcord	8/10 stars

Magnetic Man is the debut album by the English dubstep supergroup of the same name. It was released on 8 October 2010 via Startime International. It features vocals provided by different guest vocalists, including Katy B and Ms. Dynamite.

== Singles ==
- "I Need Air" was the first single released from the album, it was released on 23 July 2010 and reached number 10 on the UK Singles Chart, it also charted in Belgium.
- "Perfect Stranger" was the second single released from the album featuring Katy B. It was released on 1 October 2010 and reached number 16 on the UK Singles Chart.
- "Getting Nowhere" was the third single released from the album. It was released on 18 February 2011 and reached number 65 on the UK Singles Chart.
- "Anthemic" was the fourth single to have been released from the album. To accompany the release, grime rapper P Money was added to the track – the version received its debut performance in May 2011; with the single released on 22 July 2011.

== Track listing ==
No.	Title	Length
1.	"Flying into Tokyo"	3:09
2.	"Fire" (featuring Ms. Dynamite)	4:39
3.	"I Need Air" (featuring Angela Hunte)	4:16
4.	"Anthemic" (featuring P Money)	6:08
5.	"The Bug"	4:14
6.	"Ping Pong"	6:29
7.	"Perfect Stranger" (featuring Katy B)	5:57
8.	"Mad"	3:45
9.	"Boiling Water" (featuring Sam Frank)	3:36
10.	"K Dance"	3:16
11.	"Crossover" (featuring Katy B)	4:15
12.	"Box of Ghosts"	3:45
13.	"Karma Crazy"	4:13
14.	"Getting Nowhere" (featuring John Legend)	4:29

iTunes bonus tracks
No.	Title	Length
15.	"Album Mixtape (Continuous Mix)"	54:19
16.	"Certified Banger"	5:27
17.	"Corner of a Dark Room"	4:29
18.	"I Need Air (Digital Soundboy Remix)" (featuring Angela Hunte)	5:21
19.	"I Need Air (Redlight Remix)" (featuring Angela Hunte)	4:19
20.	"Perfect Stranger (Benga Remix)" (featuring Katy B)	4:41

Reissued bonus tracks
No.	Title	Length
15.	"Anthemic" (featuring P Money)	3:49

== Chart performance ==
Chart (2010)	Peak position
Belgian Albums Chart (Flanders)	60
UK Albums Chart	5
UK Dance Chart	1
UK Download Chart	3

== Release history ==
Region	Edition	Date	Format	Label	Catalogue
United Kingdom	Standard	8 October 2010	Digital download	Columbia	B003VKVVV8
United Kingdom	Standard	11 October 2010	CD	Columbia	B003VKVVV8
United Kingdom	Reissued	22 July 2011	Digital download	Columbia	
