= Daydreamer (Flux Pavilion song) =

2012 single by Flux Pavilion and Example

Single by Flux Pavilion featuring Example
- Released: 14 March 2012
- Genre: Dubstep
- Length: 3:32
- Label: Warner Music
- Songwriter(s): Joshua Steele; Elliot Gleave
- Producer(s): Flux Pavilion

Flux Pavilion singles chronology
| "Superbad" (2011) | "Daydreamer" (2012) | "Jah No Partial" (2012) |

Example singles chronology
| "Midnight Run" (2011) | "Daydreamer" (2012) | "We'll Be Coming Back" (2012) |

"Daydreamer" is a song by English dubstep producer and DJ Flux Pavilion. The song was released in the United Kingdom on 14 March 2012 for digital download. The song features vocals from British singer and rapper Example, who later included the song as a bonus track in the deluxe version of his fourth studio album, The Evolution of Man.

== Music video ==
A music video to accompany the release of "Daydreamer" was first released onto YouTube on 6 March 2012 at a total length of three minutes and thirty-seven seconds.

== Track listings ==
Digital download
| No. | Title | Length |
|---|---|---|
| 1. | "Daydreamer" (Radio Edit) | 3:32 |
| 2. | "Daydreamer" (Dillon Francis Remix) | 4:38 |
| 3. | "Daydreamer" (Danny Byrd Remix) | 4:48 |
| 4. | "Daydreamer" (Jack Beats Remix) | 5:17 |
| 5. | "Daydreamer" (Extended Version) | 3:49 |

== Chart performance ==
| Chart (2012) | Peak position |
|---|---|
| UK Dance (OCC) | 9 |
| UK Singles (OCC) | 39 |

== Release history ==
| Region | Date | Format | Label |
|---|---|---|---|
| United Kingdom | 14 March 2012 | Digital download | Warner Music |
