= I Need Air =

Single by Magnetic Man featuring Angela Hunte

from the album Magnetic Man
- B-side: "Mad"
- Released: 23 July 2010
- Recorded: 2010
- Genre: Dubstep
- Length: 4:18
- Label: Sony; Columbia
- Songwriter(s): Arthur Smith; Angela Hunte; Beni Adejumo; Oliver Jones
- Producer(s): Magnetic Man

Magnetic Man singles chronology
"I Need Air" (2010)	"Perfect Stranger" (2010)

"I Need Air" is the debut single by British electronic music project Magnetic Man, featuring American-Trinidadian singer Angela Hunte. It was released from their debut album Magnetic Man. The single was released in the United Kingdom on 23 July 2010, peaking at number 10 on the UK Singles Chart. It also peaked in the top 20 in Belgium and Denmark. "I Need Air" and its following releases are characteristic of the fast developing dubstep genre. The song features the refrain from Magnetic Man's promotional release "Mad" towards the end of the song.

== Critical reception ==
"I Need Air" received vast critical praise from contemporary critics. Wendy Roby from Drowned in Sound deemed the song as a "faultless pop record". Roby further described it as "so perfectly put together" and "the record you should point to if an alien drops round for a cup of tea tomorrow and asks you what modern pop sounds like."

Fraser McAlpine from BBC felt that the song was simply too good, giving it a five-star rating and complimenting its ability to make the sensation of being overwhelmed by feelings in the presence of someone you really like sound like the most solitary experience a human heart can endure. McAlpine went on to describe the way the rhythm of the vocal cuts across the beat and back again in the verses, and Angela Hunte's vocal pronunciation as brilliant.

Nick Levine of Digital Spy stated in his review of the song:

'I Need Air' is quite simply a stonker. Less simply, it's a monster-sized electropop-cum-dubstep club track that sounds as though it could coax everyone from Tristan in Dalston to Robbo from Romford to Joe at G-A-Y bar onto the dancefloor. It manages to do so while taking place entirely at midtempo. And it also contrives to make Auto-Tuned vocals - courtesy of Angela "I've got a writing credit on 'Empire State Of Mind' you know" Hunte - sound kinda cute. How clever are Magnetic Man? We'll leave you to answer that for yourself.

== Track listing ==
Digital download
No.	Title	Length
1.	"I Need Air" (Album Version)	4:18
2.	"I Need Air" (Redlight Remix)	4:20
3.	"I Need Air" (Digital Soundboy Remix)	5:23

12" vinyl No. 1
No.	Title	Length
1.	"I Need Air" (Album Version)
2.	"I Need Air" (Digital Soundboy Remix)

12" vinyl No. 2
No.	Title	Length
1.	"I Need Air" (Redlight Remix)
2.	"Mad"

== Chart performance ==
=== Weekly charts ===
Chart (2010)	Peak position
Belgium (Ultratop 50 Flanders)	27
Belgium (Ultratip Bubbling Under Wallonia)	5
Denmark (Tracklisten)	13
UK Singles (OCC)	10
UK Dance (OCC)	3

=== Year-end charts ===
Chart (2010)	Position
UK Singles (Official Charts Company)	131
