= Magnetic Man =

British electronic music project

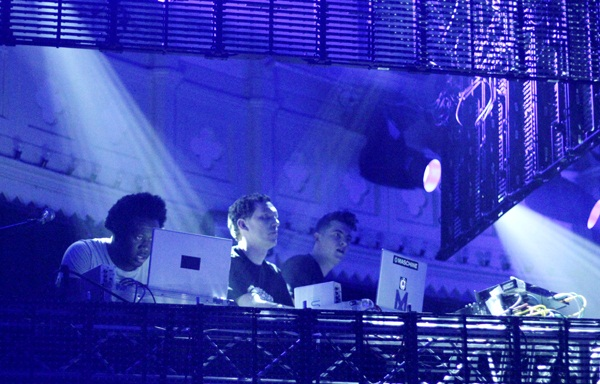
- Magnetic Man in 2010

Background information
- Genre: Dubstep
- Years active: 2007–present
- Label: Columbia
- Members: Benga; Skream; Artwork
- Website: magneticman.net

Magnetic Man is an English electronic music project from London, consisting of dubstep producers and DJs Benga, Skream and Artwork (previously known as Menta). The trio first met in the late 1990s at the Big Apple Records store in Croydon. They performed using three computers, one playing drum samples, one playing basses and the third playing leads and other samples. Artwork controlled the master laptop, to which the other two are synchronized via MIDI. Their sets usually consisted of a mix of original tracks produced together, and live remixes of Benga and Skream's tracks, accompanied by synchronized projected visuals by Novak Collective. They signed to Columbia Records in 2010. Magnetic Man completed their first full-length sellout tour on 5 November 2010. Their self-titled debut studio album, Magnetic Man, was released through Sony by Columbia Records on 10 October 2010.

== Discography ==
=== Albums ===
Year	Album details	Peak chart positions	
Year	Album details	UK	BEL (FLA)
2010	Magnetic Man: Released: 11 October 2010; Label: Columbia Records; Formats: CD, digital download, vinyl	5	60

=== Extended plays ===
Year	Album
2009	The Cyberman: Released: 30 March 2009; Label: Magnet; Formats: digital download, vinyl

=== Singles ===
Year	Single	Peak chart positions				Album
Year	Single	UK	BEL (FLA)	BEL (WAL)	DEN	Album
2010	"I Need Air" (featuring Angela Hunte)	10	27	55	13	Magnetic; Man
2010	"Perfect Stranger" (featuring Katy B)	16	63	78	—	Magnetic; Man
2011	"Getting Nowhere" (featuring John Legend)	65	54	82	—	Magnetic; Man
2011	"Anthemic" (featuring P Money)	50	61	—	—	Magnetic; Man

=== Other charted songs ===
Year	Single	Peak positions		Album
Year	Single	UK	UK DAN	Album
2010	"Crossover" (featuring Katy B)	114	19	Magnetic Man

=== Produced songs ===
Year	Title	Artist	Album
2011	"Easy Please Me"	Katy B	On a Mission

=== Written songs ===
Year	Title	Artist	Album
2011	Go Away	Katy B	On a Mission
2011	Hard to Get	Katy B	On a Mission

=== Other songs ===
Year	Single	Album
2007	"Soulz" (Benga Remix)	Dubstep Allstars: Volume 5
2007	"Alright, What's Happening?"	Dubstep Allstars: Volume 5
2007	"Ligma"	Dubstep Allstars: Volume 5
2008	"Ligma VIP"	Mary Anne Hobbs presents Evangeline
