= P Money =

British grime MC from South East London

- Born: Paris Joel Moore-Williams; 8 April 1989 (age 37); New Cross, London, England
- Genres: Grime
- Occupations: MC; rapper; songwriter
- Years active: 2005–present
- Labels: Rinse, Butterz
- Formerly of: OGz, Fatal Assassins

Paris Joel Moore-Williams (born 8 April 1989), better known by his stage name P Money, is a British grime MC, rapper and songwriter from New Cross, South East London, who is also active in the drum and bass scene. He is best known for his live performances as well as for songs such as "Slang Like This", "Anthemic" and "Round the Clock". N.E was the founding member of Lewisham-based grime crew OGz and P Money released one album with the group entitled OGz Season Vol. 1. He also appeared on the sixth edition of highly popular grime DVD Lord of the Mics (LOTM 6) in a grime clash (battle).

== Biography ==
P Money began his career within the crew Fatal Assassins along with MCs such as Little Dee, Blacks and Firmer D. During these times, P Money was known for his fast, skippy flow which created plenty of hype when attending pirate radio shows. He attended many classic studio sets such as those from the Hazardous Sessions series and also Fuck Radio volume 5. He gained a lot of positive attention with the massive single "What Did He Say", which has since been released on vinyl and digital download, as well as the title being used as a slogan for a line of T-shirts. He is currently a member of the crew OGs and was involved with the collective's first release, OG Season.

P Money Is Power, P Money's debut album, received mixed reviews, with some people doubting the strength of some productions on the CD. However praise has been given to tracks such as the remix of "What Did He Say" and "Sounds and Gimmicks".

Money Over Everyone is the second release from P Money which featured producers such as Maniac, Scratcha and Rude Kid.

In 2010, he collaborated with Kiss 100's DJ Swerve, who remixed Marco Del Horno's "Ho!", to release "Ho Riddim" with P Money.

At the tail end of 2010 and in 2011, P Money featured on two singles which hit the charts, the first being "Pow 2011" which peaked at No. 33 on the UK charts and featured fellow grime artists Lethal Bizzle, Jme, Wiley, Chip, 2Face, Ghetts and Kano. Even though P Money and Ghetts were involved in a beef at the time, they squashed the beef to appear on the track. The second was "Anthemic", which was released as the fourth single from Magnetic Man's eponymous debut album Magnetic Man; this reached No. 50 on the UK charts. At the time it was also the "Hottest Record in the World" on Zane Lowe's weekly blog.

P Money also finished eighth in MTV's list of the best UK MCs of 2010, which was announced in February 2011. This sparked a response from fellow UK MC Ghetts, who was left off the list, and aimed criticism at P Money in his track "Who's on the Panel". After trading war dubs between each other, the battle between the two MCs came to a head when Risky Roadz offered to film and stream a live clash on Mic Fight, with P Money signing the contract but Ghetts ultimately pulling out.

P Money released "Boo You" alongside Blacks on Butterz in May 2011, the first and one of the few vocal releases on the label.

P Money also toured with English rapper Example's in his UK stadium tour during 2011 and 2012 along with British rapper Wretch 32 and American DJ Alvin Risk. He also opened for Tyga's UK tour.

On 27 August 2012, he released the Dubsteppin EP through Rinse. He also appeared on the DJ Zinc single "Reload", the B-side to "Goin' In".

His third EP, Round the Clock, featuring a title track produced by Loadstar, was released on 18 November 2013. The EP features three other tracks and a remix of the title track.

In May 2014, P Money infamously 'clashed' with North London MC Big H at Lord of the Mics 6, a grime-focused battle series curated by Jammer, a ubiquitous figure within the grime scene and member of influential grime crew Boy Better Know. The event, despite being advertised as one of the most noteworthy events in the genre's short history, was ultimately met with widespread disappointment by fans, as Big H left the stage, citing unsatisfactory payment, before the 'clash' could reach its intended conclusion.

He later featured in "Lamborghini" by gaming YouTuber and influencer KSI, a single which reached number 30 on the UK Singles Chart. His 2019 track "Where & When", a collaborative effort in conjunction with rapper Giggs released on P Money's mixtape Money Over Everyone 3, was included on the soundtrack of popular football simulation video game FIFA 20.

In 2021, P Money released "This Year", a collaboration with Silencer featuring YouTuber and rapper TBJZL. The music video was posted on P Money's YouTube channel on March 18, 2021.

== Personal life ==
P Money is of Jamaican descent. He is a fan of Arsenal F.C. He has two sons.

== Discography ==
=== Studio albums ===
List of albums, with selected chart positions
Title	Album details	Peak chart positions
Title	Album details	UK
Live & Direct	Released: 25 November 2016; Label: Rinse; Formats: CD, digital download	94

=== Collaboration albums ===
List of collaborative albums, with selected chart positions
Title	Album details	Peak chart positions
Title	Album details	UK
Streets, Love & Other Stuff (with Whiney)	Released: October 6, 2023; Label: Hospital Records; Formats: CD, digital download	—

=== Mixtapes ===
Year	Title	References
2007	Coins 2 Notes	-
2008	P Money Is Power	-
2009	Money Over Everyone	-
2011	Blacks & P (with Blacks)	-
2013	#MAD	-
2015	Money Over Everyone 2	-
2019	Money Over Everyone 3	-
2023	Money Over Everyone 4	-
2024	Champions League (with Smack One)	-

=== EPs ===
Year	Title	References
2009	What Did He Say?	-
2011	I Beat the Tune	-
2012	Dubsteppin'	-
2013	Round the Clock	-
2014	Originators	-
2015	I Beat the Tune 2	-
2016	Thank You	-
2017	Snake	-
2017	Snake 2	-
2018	Back to Back (with Little Dee)	-
2020	While We Wait	-
2021	Untraditional (with Silencer)	-

=== Singles ===
Year	Title	References
2007	"What Did He Say?"	-
2012	"Reload" (with DJ Zinc)	-
2015	"Lamborghini" (with KSI)	-
2015	"10/10"	-
2019	"Shots" (with Jubilee)	-
2019	"You Get Me" (with Jubilee)	-
2019	"No One"	-
2019	"Shook"	-
2020	"Wake Up Call (Yoshi Remix)" (with KSI, Trippie Redd and Tobi)	-
2021	"This Year" (with Tobi) (Prod. by Silencer)	-
2021	"Buss The Red" (Prod. by Whiney)	-
2022	"Sorry I'm Not Sorry" (Prod. by Whiney)	-
2022	"Outplayed"	-
2022	"Dead in the Eye" (with Example) (Prod. by Whiney)	-
2022	"Duppy" (with GRM Daily)	-
