= Benga (musician) =

British musician

- Born: Adegbenga Adejumo; 1 September 1986 (age 40); Clapton, London, England
- Origin: Croydon, South London, England
- Genres: Bass; dubstep; UK garage; future house
- Occupations: Record producer; DJ
- Instruments: Synthesiser; sampler; drums; vocals
- Years active: 2002–2014; 2015–present
- Labels: Big Apple; Benga Beats; Tempa
- Member of: Magnetic Man

Adegbenga Otomayomi Adejumo (born 1 September 1986), known as Benga, is a British musician from Croydon, known for being a pioneer of dubstep record production. He has been featured on a variety of compilations including Mary Anne Hobbs's Warrior Dubz, Tempa's The Roots of Dubstep and the BBC Radio 1Xtra anniversary mix.

== Career ==
Adejumo is of Yoruba Nigerian descent.

Inspired by UK garage producer Wookie, Benga would produce tunes on a PlayStation, and subsequently FruityLoops. As a teenager he would visit the Big Apple record shop in Croydon where he was introduced to Skream, and together they would help forge the sound of dubstep emerging in the early 2000s. His productions caught the attention of DJ Hatcha, who worked at the shop, and, by the age of 15, Benga had made his first record, "Skank", released on Big Apple's own record label in 2002.

Benga's second release was a collaboration with Skream, called "The Judgement". Further releases followed on Big Apple Records, Hotflush Recordings and Planet Mu, before Benga self-released his debut album Newstep in 2006. As dubstep garnered mainstream attention, Benga continued to release singles, including a collaboration with Coki of Digital Mystikz called "Night", that reached 98 in the UK Singles Chart in 2008. Diary of an Afro Warrior, Benga's second album, followed in the same year with Resident Advisor describing it as "one of the most anticipated LPs in dubstep yet."

In 2007 Benga along with fellow producers Skream and Artwork, formed the dubstep supergroup Magnetic Man. This resulted in the release of an EP and eponymous studio album in 2009 and 2010, respectively. Benga also produced Katy B's debut single "Katy on a Mission", which peaked at number 5 in the UK Singles Chart in 2010.

From January 2011, Benga joined BBC Radio 1 with Skream as part of 'In New DJs We Trust', and presented a weekly Friday night show. Skream and Benga performed together at Field Day music festival in Sydney on New Year's Day 2012.

Benga generated controversy in July 2012 after reportedly saying he wished to remove himself from dubstep, insisting that he no longer wanted to be a part of the genre. He went on to clarify his comments saying "For me to remain creative, I've kinda not got to call my music dubstep and for me to keep pushing boundaries and moving around, making songs... I can't call myself dubstep."

In 2013, he released his third album Chapter II on Sony Music, which included the single "Forefather" featuring Kano. He also created an official remix of Donna Summer's "I Feel Love", which features on the tribute remix album Love To Love You Donna, and co-produced Dominique Young Unique's 2014 debut single "Throw It Down" with DJ Fresh.

On 2 February 2014, Adejumo announced on social media that following his engagement to Holly-Jae Treadgold, he was retiring to focus on raising a family. However, in May 2014, he announced plans to complete a new album.

In September 2015, Benga revealed via his Twitter account that mental health issues had been the reason for his retirement announcement. In an interview with The Guardian, he explained that he noticed issues in late 2013 and was subsequently sectioned in March 2014. He stated that excessive touring led to schizophrenia. In an interview with Annie Mac on BBC Radio 1 in 2018, Benga claimed to have deleted all of his productions from his hard drive during his hospital stay. He premiered a new track "Psychosis" on the radio show, inspired by and to treat his psychological experiences, and was released in February 2018 on his new Illuminate record label.

In January 2025, Skream and Benga announced they had started a collaborative album together, their first collaborative work since Magnetic Man. Neither of them announced the name or release date of the project, and have since released two singles, "Good Things Come To Those Who Wait" in June and "Midnight Control" featuring Emily Makis in November. They would perform at another show together in November with Boiler Room in Melbourne.

In 2026, Skream and Benga released a collaborative remix of Fred Again and Amyl and the Sniffers' track "You're a Star", which featured on Fred Again's USB002 Remixes EP and premiered on the UKF Dubstep YouTube channel on the 6th of March.

== Discography ==
=== Albums ===
Title	Album details	Peak chart positions
Title	Album details	UK
Diary of an Afro Warrior	Released: 10 March 2008; Label: Tempa; Formats: CD, vinyl, digital download	139
Chapter II	Released: 6 May 2013; Label: Sony Music; Formats: CD, vinyl, digital download	93

=== EPs ===
Title	EP details
The Judgement (with Skream)	Released: 2003; Label: Big Apple Records; Formats: Vinyl, CD
Benga Beats Volume 1	Released: 2004; Label: Benga Beats; Formats: CD
Invasion	Released: 2006; Label: Big Apple Records; Formats: CD
The Southside EP	Released: 17 July 2006; Label: Southside Dubstars; Formats: CD
Benga EP Volume 2	Released: 17 January 2007; Label: Southside Dubstars; Formats: CD
Pleasure EP	Released: 3 November 2008; Label: Tempa; Formats: CD
Phaze: One	Released: 10 May 2010; Label: Tempa; Formats: CD
Scion A/V Presents: Skream & Benga	Released: 7 December 2011; Label: Scion Audio/Visual; Formats: Digital download
Future Funk EP	Released: 26 February 2016; Label: Benga Beats; Formats: Digital download, 12" vinyl (300 copies)

=== Singles ===
==== As lead artist ====
Year	Title	Peak chart positions	Album
Year	Title	UK	Album
2002	"Skank"	—	Non-album singles
2004	"Hydro" / "Elektro" (with Skream)	—	Non-album singles
2006	"Comb 60s"	—	Non-album singles
2006	"10 Tons Heavy"	—	Non-album singles
2006	"Spooksville" (with Walsh)	—	Non-album singles
2006	"Military" (with Walsh)	—	Non-album singles
2007	"Bingo" (with Walsh)	—	Non-album singles
2007	"Crunked Up"	—	Diary of an Afro Warrior
2008	"Night" (with Coki)	98	Diary of an Afro Warrior
2008	"Electro Scratch" / "The Germ"	—	Non-album singles
2008	"Addicts" (with Walsh and Darqwan)	—	Non-album singles
2009	"Technocal" (with Skream)	—	Non-album singles
2009	"Buzzin'"	—	Non-album singles
2010	"Stop Watching"	—	Non-album singles
2010	"Biscuit Factory" / "Bass Face" (with Darqwan)	—	Non-album singles
2010	"Truben" (with Paul Trueman)	—	Non-album singles
2011	"Faithless" / "Acid Lie"	—	Non-album singles
2011	"Transformers" (with Kutz)	—	Non-album singles
2012	"I Will Never Change"	—	Chapter II
2012	"Icon" (featuring Bebe Black)	—	Non-album singles
2012	"Pour Your Love" (featuring Marlene)	189	Non-album singles
2012	"We're Coming Out"	—	Non-album singles
2012	"Open Your Eyes"	—	Non-album singles
2012	"To Hell and Back"	—	Chapter II
2013	"Forefather" (featuring Kano)	123	Chapter II
2018	"Psychosis"	—	Non-album single
2025	"Good Things Come To Those Who Wait" (with Skream)	—	Upcoming
2025	"Midnight Control" (with Skream) (featuring Emily Makis)	—	Upcoming

=== Production credits ===
Year	Track	Artist	Release
2010	"Ho"	Youngman	"Ho / One & Only"
2010	"One & Only"	Youngman	"Ho / One & Only"
2010	"Katy on a Mission"	Katy B	On a Mission
2011	"Tear It Out"	Youngman	"Tear It Out / I Warned Ya"
2011	"I Warned Ya"	Youngman	"Tear It Out / I Warned Ya"
2012	"Come Taste the Rainbow"	Example	The Evolution of Man
2013	"Busketeer (Ghetto Yout Fi Rich)"	Kano featuring Elephant Man	Non-album singles
2014	"Throw It Down" (with DJ Fresh)	Dominique Young Unique	Non-album singles
2016	"Can't Do It like Me"	Azealia Banks	Slay-Z
