= Flux Pavilion =

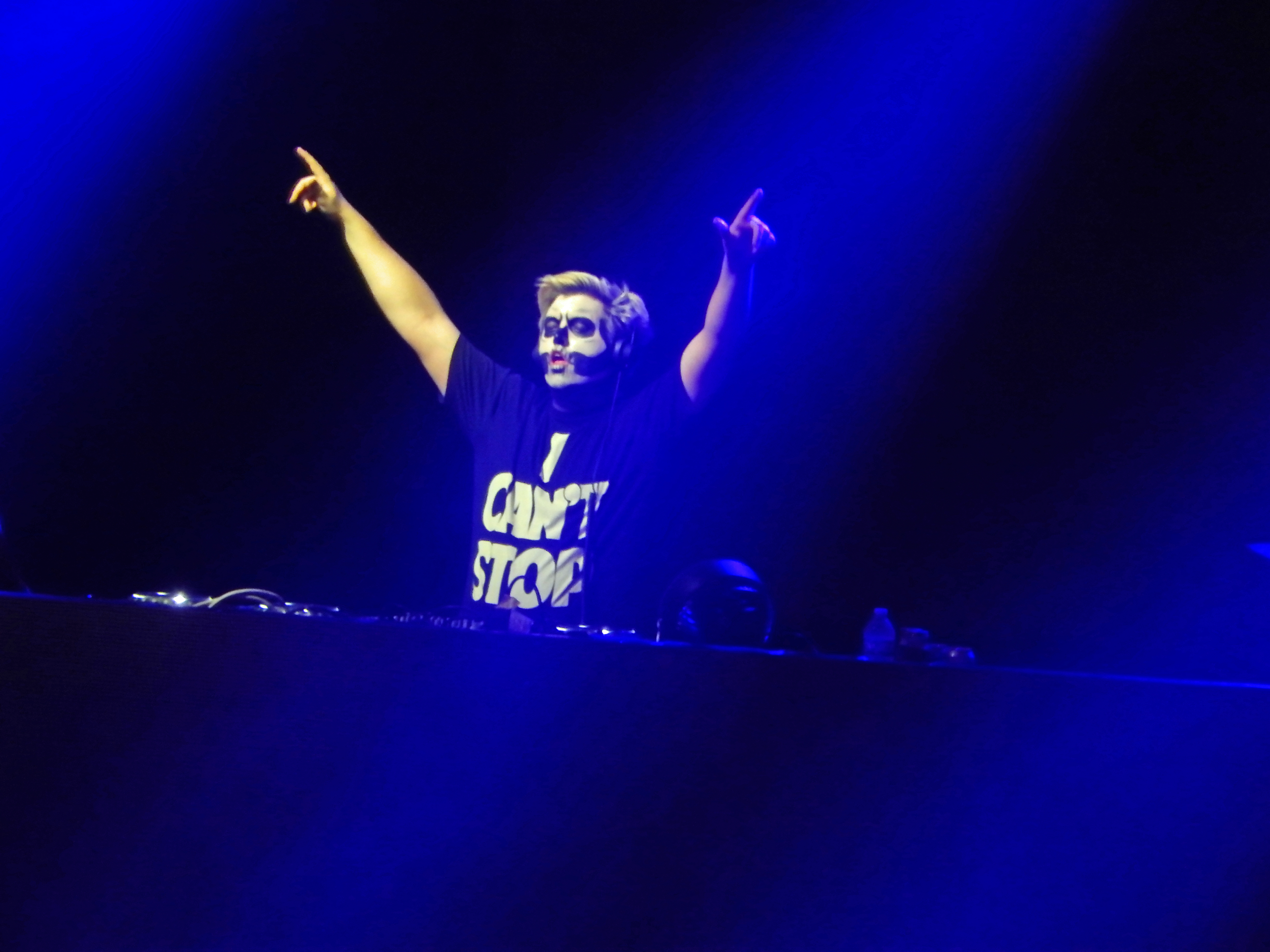
- Flux Pavilion in 2014

Background information
- Born: Joshua Kierkegaard Grant Steele; 15 January 1989 (age 37); Towcester, United Kingdom
- Genres: Dubstep; drum and bass; electronica; electro house
- Occupations: Producer; DJ; singer-songwriter
- Instruments: Music sequencer; sampler; synthesiser; drum machine; turntables; keyboard; saxophone; guitar; trumpet; piano; vocals; drums
- Years active: 2008–present
- Labels: Routon; Circus; Big Beat; Atlantic; Monstercat
- Website: fluxpavilion.com

Joshua Kierkegaard Grant Steele (born 15 January 1989), known professionally as Flux Pavilion, is an English EDM producer, DJ, singer-songwriter and label owner. He started performing in 2008.

Flux Pavilion has headlined three US tours, two UK tours, and several festival DJ sets, including Glastonbury, Reading, Coachella, and EDC Vegas. He has performed live with Example, Foreign Beggars and Chiddy Bang. Flux Pavilion says he draws inspiration from The Prodigy and Rusko.

== Career ==
=== 2009–2010 ===

Steele and his childhood friend, Doctor P, co-founded Circus Records in 2009 backed by D&B pioneer DJ Swan-E and Earl Falconer of UB40. He released Lines In Wax in 2010 with the song "I Can't Stop", which would find various adaptations in pop culture. Chiddy Bang recorded a freestyle to the song, appearing on his Peanut Butter and Swelly mixtape. The track "Who Gon Stop Me" by Jay-Z and Kanye West on their collaborative album Watch the Throne samples the track. "I Can't Stop" was used in the viral Kony 2012 campaign, the video game SSX, and the trailer for the 2013 film Rush.

=== 2011–2012 ===
In 2011, Flux Pavilion produced the single "Bass Cannon", which peaked at number 56 on the UK Singles Chart, and was placed on the Radio 1 A-List. Flux Pavilion and Doctor P released the 2011 compilation album Circus One, where he contributed four tracks. In December 2011, Steele was nominated for the BBC's Sound of 2012 poll, as one of two independent artists on the longlist. Steele also sang on multiple tracks for himself and other artists, including "Voscillate", "Starlight", and "The Scientist".

=== 2013 ===
On 28 January 2013, Flux Pavilion released Blow the Roof which generally received critical favorability. The song "Double Edge" from the EP is featured in the 2012 video game Need for Speed: Most Wanted. Steele released Freeway on 11 November 2013 featuring Steve Aoki and Turin Brakes with the song "Gold Love" including vocals from Rosie Oddie.

=== 2014–present ===
In September 2014, Steele was asked by The Walt Disney Company to remix the Star Wars Rebels theme to advertise the series. In 2015, Flux Pavilion released his debut studio album, Tesla. In 2021, he released his second studio album .wav.

== Discography ==
- Tesla (2015)
- .wav (2021)

== Awards and nominations ==
Year	Organization	Award	Result
2011	BBC Sound of 2012	Sound of 2012	Nominated
