= William Brown =

William, Will, Willie, Bill or Billy Brown may refer to:

== Academics ==
- William Brown (physician) (1748–1792), American physician
- William Brown (veterinarian) (1861–1931), English veterinarian and activist
- William Brown (plant pathologist) (1888–1975), British mycologist and plant pathologist
- William Brown (psychologist) (1881–1952), British psychologist
- William Fuller Brown Jr. (1904–1983), American physicist
- W. G. Brown, Canadian mathematician
- William Harvey Brown (1862–1913), American naturalist
- William Jethro Brown (1868–1930), Australian jurist and professor of law
- William L. Brown (geneticist) (1913–1991), American geneticist
- W. Norman Brown (1892–1975), American Indologist and Sanskritist
- William Brown (industrial relations expert) (1945–2019), British academic, Master of Darwin College, Cambridge
- William Yancey Brown (born 1948), American zoologist and attorney
- William Brown (author) (born 1977), British film academic and author

== Arts and entertainment ==
- William Brown (composer) (1790–1884), American composer and flutist
- William Alexander Brown (1790–1884), African-American playwright and theatrical producer
- William Mason Brown (1828–1898), American artist
- William Kellock Brown (1856–1934), Scottish sculptor
- William J. Brown (architect) (died 1970), American architect
- Willie Brown (musician) (1900–1952), American delta blues guitarist and singer
- William Theophilus Brown (1919–2012), American artist
- William Brown (tenor) (1938–2004), American opera singer
- Billy Brown (Irish musician) (1943–1999), Irish musician and artist, and member of The Freshmen
- Billy Brown (singer) (born 1944), member of American rhythm and blues band Ray, Goodman & Brown
- W. Earl Brown (born 1963), American character actor
- Guillermo E. Brown (born 1976), American drummer and multi-disciplinary performer
- William Brown, better known as Compa, British electronic musician
- Bill Brown (filmmaker) (active since 1994), American filmmaker and author
- William H. Brown Jr. (1917–1982), American television director and producer, radio dramatist, and composer
- Bille Brown (William Gerald Brown, 1952–2013), Australian actor, director and playwright

== Sportspeople ==
=== American football ===
- Bill Brown (linebacker) (1936–1989), American football player
- Bill Brown (American football) (1938–2018), American football running back
- Willie Brown (American football) (1940–2019), American football Hall-of-Fame cornerback
- Willie Brown (American football, born 1942) (1942–2018), Tampa Bay Buccaneers coach
- Billy Brown (tight end) (born 1993), American football tight end

=== Association football ===
- William Brown (goalkeeper) (fl. 1889–1895), English footballer
- William Brown (footballer, born 1865), English footballer
- William Brown (footballer, born 1874) (1874–1940), English footballer and cricketer
- William Brown (footballer, born 1876), Scottish footballer
- William Brown (footballer, born 1882), English footballer; see List of Bury F.C. players (1–24 appearances)
- William Brown (footballer, born 1885), Scottish footballer
- William Brown (footballer, born July 1885) (1885–1915), Scottish footballer
- William Brown (footballer, born 1889), Scottish footballer
- William Brown (footballer, born 1897), Scottish footballer
- Willie Brown (footballer, born 1900) (1900–1977), Scottish footballer (Rochdale AFC, Torquay United)
- Billy Brown (footballer, born 1900) (1900–1985), English professional footballer
- Bill Brown (footballer, born 1902) (1902–1985), Scottish footballer
- William Brown (footballer, born 1907) (1907–1976), English footballer and sprinter
- Buster Brown (footballer) (William Ian Brown, 1910–1993), footballer who played in the Football League
- William Brown (footballer, born 1912) (1912–2008), Scottish footballer
- Willie Brown (footballer, born 1922) (1922–1978), Scottish football player (Preston North End, Grimsby Town) and manager (Barrow AFC)
- Willie Brown (footballer, born 1928) (1928–2017), Scottish footballer (Forfar Athletic, Accrington Stanley)
- Bill Brown (footballer, born 1928) (1928–2010), English footballer
- Bill Brown (footballer, born 1931) (1931–2004), Scottish international football (soccer) goalkeeper (Dundee, Tottenham Hotspur)
- Willie Brown (footballer, born 1938), Scottish footballer (Accrington Stanley, Chester City, Greenock Morton)
- Bill Brown (footballer, born 1943), English football (soccer) player (Gillingham FC)
- Willie Brown (footballer, born 1950), Scottish footballer (Newport County, Torquay United)
- Billy Brown (footballer, born 1950), Scottish football player and coach

=== Athletics ===
- Bill Brown (race walker) (1878–1980), British Olympic racewalker
- Billy Brown (athlete) (1918–2002), American track and field triple jumper, long jumper, and sprinter
- Bill Brown (runner) (1925–2018), American middle distance and relay runner

=== Australian rules football ===
- Bill Brown (footballer, born 1882) (1882–1949), player for Geelong
- Bill Brown (footballer, born 1906) (1906–1981), player for Hawthorn
- Bill Brown (footballer, born 1914) (1914–1980), player for Carlton and Collingwood
- Billy Brown (Australian footballer) (born 1942), former Australian rules footballer who played in the VFL

=== Baseball ===
- William Brown (baseball) (1866–1897), American Major League catcher
- Bill Brown (outfielder) (1893–1965), American baseball player
- Bill Brown (sportscaster) (born 1947), American baseball broadcaster and member of the Texas Baseball Hall of Fame
- Bill Brown (baseball coach) (born 1957), American college baseball coach

=== Basketball ===
- Bill Brown (basketball, born 1922) (1922–2007), American professional basketball player
- Rookie Brown (1925–1971), American professional basketball player
- Bill Brown (basketball, born 1951) (1951–2023), American basketball coach at California University of Pennsylvania
- Will Brown (basketball) (born 1971), American basketball coach

=== Cricket ===
- William Brown (MCC cricketer), English first-class cricketer
- William Brown (Tasmanian cricketer) (1807–1859), English-born Tasmanian first-class cricketer
- William Brown (cricketer, born 1866), English cricketer
- William Brown (cricketer, born 1876) (1876–1942), English first-class cricketer
- William Brown (cricketer, born 1888) (1888–1964), English cricketer
- William Brown (cricketer, born 1889), English cricketer
- William Brown (cricketer, born 1900) (1900–1986), English cricketer
- Bill Brown (cricketer) (1912–2008), Australian cricketer
- William Brown (New Zealand cricketer) (born 1917)

=== Golf ===
- William Brown (golfer) (born c. 1854), Scottish golfer
- Willie Brown (golfer) (born c. 1858), 19th century Scottish golfer
- Billy Ray Brown (born 1963), former American golfer

=== Rugby ===
- William Davie Brown (1852–1876), Scottish rugby union player
- William Sorley Brown (1860–1901), Scottish rugby union player
- William Brown (rugby league) (1916–1982), Australian rugby league player
- Willie Brown (rugby league) (born 1979), former Sydney Roosters rugby league player
- Bill Brown (rugby union) (William James Brown, born 1943), Ireland rugby union player

=== Other sports ===
- William Brown (tennis) (born 1945), American tennis player
- Will Brown (racing driver) (born 1998), Australian racing driver
- Bill Brown (boxing) (William J. Brown, 1874–1943), American boxing commissioner, referee, and promoter
- Bill Brown (boxer) (William George Brown), Welsh boxer

== Clergymen and theologians ==
- William Brown (priest) (1710–1797), Archdeacon of Northampton
- William Laurence Brown (1755–1830), Scottish divine (theologian)
- William Brown (clergyman) (1766–1835), Scottish clergyman and Hebraist
- William Haig Brown (1823–1907), English cleric and headmaster of Charterhouse School
- William Montgomery Brown (1855–1937), American Episcopalian bishop and Communist author
- William Cabell Brown (1861–1927), American Episcopal missionary and bishop of Virginia
- William Francis Brown (1862–1951), auxiliary bishop in the Roman Catholic Archdiocese of Southwark
- William Adams Brown (1865–1943), American minister, professor and philanthropist
- William A. Brown (bishop) (1878–1965), American who served as the fourth Bishop of Southern Virginia
- William P. Brown, American Presbyterian minister, author and biblical theologian

== Engineers ==
- William H. Brown (shipbuilder) (1803–1855), American shipbuilder
- William Liston Brown (1842–1929), American industrialist
- William C. Brown (1916–1999), American electrical engineer
- William F. Brown (engineer) (1919–2010), American welding engineer
- William Brown (bridge designer) (1928–2005), English structural engineer, bridge designer
- William Brown (mining engineer) (1717–1782), English mining engineer, waggonway designer and steam engine builder

== Military people ==
- William Brown (British Army officer) (1922–1984), commander of the Gilgit Scouts during the Partition of India
- William Brown (soldier) (1759–1808), American Revolutionary War soldier
- William Brown (Royal Navy officer) (1764–1814), British Royal Navy admiral
- William Brown (admiral) (1777–1857), or Guillermo Brown, Irish-Argentine Navy admiral
- William Brown (sailor) (birth name unknown), Black woman who briefly served in the Royal Navy in 1815, disguised as a man
- William A. Brown (admiral) (born 1958), vice admiral in the US Navy
- William H. Brown (Medal of Honor) (1836–1896), American Civil War sailor and Medal of Honor recipient
- William Henry Brown (aviator) (1894–1969), Canadian World War I flying ace
- William Maurice Brown (1910–1975), New Zealand Lt. Colonel; first principal of Faujdarhat Cadet College
- William Gustavus Brown (1809–1883), commander of British troops in China and Hong Kong
- William Perry Brown Jr. (1923–1952), American Marine and recipient of two Navy Crosses

== Politicians and diplomats ==
=== Australia ===
- William Brown (New South Wales politician) (1867–1954), member of the New South Wales Parliament
- William Brown (Tasmanian politician) (1840–1926), Australian politician
- William Villiers Brown (1843–1915), Queensland politician
- Bill Brown (Australian politician) (1920–2001), Australian senator

=== United Kingdom ===
- William Brown, MP for Gloucester in 1341
- William Brown, MP for Bedford in 1397
- Sir William Brown, 1st Baronet, of Richmond Hill (1784–1864), British merchant and banker, MP for South Lancashire 1846–1859
- Sir William Slater Brown (Lord Provost) (1844–1917), Scottish businessman and Lord Provost of Edinburgh
- William John Brown (1896–1960), MP for Rugby 1942–1950
- William Robson Brown (1900–1975), UK Conservative politician, MP for Esher 1950–1970
- William Oliver Brown (1903–1976), Scottish nationalist activist
- William Brown (Northern Ireland politician) (1930–2025), Northern Irish unionist politician, MPA for South Down 1982–1986

=== United States ===
- William Browne (judge) (sometimes reported as "Brown", 1737–1802), justice of the Massachusetts Superior Court of Judicature
- William Brown (congressman) (1779–1833), U.S. representative from Kentucky, 1819–1821
- William Brown (Illinois state representative, Morgan County), Illinois state representative
- William Little Brown (1789–1830), justice of the Tennessee Supreme Court
- William W. Brown (Wisconsin politician) (died 1871), American politician
- William G. Brown Sr. (1800–1884), U.S. representative from Virginia and West Virginia
- William J. Brown (Indiana politician) (1805–1857), U.S. representative from Indiana
- William Matt Brown (1815–1885), mayor of Nashville, Tennessee, 1865–1867
- William Brown (Illinois politician) (1819–1891), member of the Illinois House of Representatives and mayor of Rockford, Illinois, 1857–1858
- William Brown (Louisiana politician) (1832–1883), Louisiana State Superintendent of Education, 1872–1876
- William Wallace Brown (1836–1926), U.S. representative from Pennsylvania
- William L. Brown (politician) (1840–1906), Ohio and New York politician
- William Ripley Brown (1840–1916), U.S. representative from Kansas
- William M. Brown (Pennsylvania politician) (1850–1915), U.S. lieutenant governor of Pennsylvania, electee to the U.S. House of Representatives
- William M. Brown (Illinois state senator) (born 1860), member of the Illinois Senate
- William G. Brown Jr. (1856–1916), U.S. representative from West Virginia, son of William G. Brown
- William Anderson Brown (1861–1940), lawyer, member of the Minnesota legislature
- William E. Brown Jr. (1896–1970), mayor of Ann Arbor, 1945–1957
- W. K. Brown (1923–2011), member of the Louisiana House of Representatives for Grant Parish, 1960–1972
- William Holmes Brown (1929–2001), parliamentarian of the U.S. House of Representatives, 1974–1994
- William Andreas Brown (1930–2024), U.S. ambassador to Israel, 1988–1992
- Willie Brown (politician) (born 1934), mayor of San Francisco, 1996–2004, speaker of the California State Assembly, 1980–1995
- William J. Brown (Ohio politician) (1940–1999), Ohio Attorney General, elected 1970
- Willie B. Brown (1940–2009), American politician in New Jersey

=== Elsewhere ===
- William Brown (British Columbia politician) (1838–1915), Canadian politician in British Columbia
- William Brown (Manitoba politician), Canadian politician, 1922–1927
- William Heartz Brown (1883–1967), Canadian politician in the Nova Scotia House of Assembly
- William Brown (New Zealand politician) (1809–1898), member of first New Zealand Parliament
- William Brown (Newfoundland politician), member of the Newfoundland and Labrador House of Assembly
- Bill Brown (New Zealand politician) (1899–1967), New Zealand politician of the National Party

== Writers ==
- William Brown (journalist) (1737–1789), Canadian journalist and co-founder of the Quebec Gazette
- William Hill Brown (1765–1793), American novelist
- William Wells Brown (1814–1884), fugitive slave, African-American writer, and abolitionist
- William Slater Brown (1896–1997), American novelist, biographer and translator
- William F. Brown (writer) (1928–2019), American playwright
- William Henry Brown (journalist) (1867/68–1950), British co-operative movement journalist and activist

== Other notable people ==
- William D. Brown (1813–1863), founder of Omaha, Nebraska
- William Brown (miner) (1824/25–1900), British trade union leader
- William Penn Brown (1841–1929), American pioneer in the hobby of stamp collecting
- William Lincoln Brown (1862–1940), second Register of Copyrights in the US Copyright Office
- William Robinson Brown (1875–1955), American horse breeder and director of the Brown Company
- William B. Brown (1912–1985), American lawyer and judge in Hawaii and Ohio
- William H. Brown III (born 1928), African American attorney, fourth Chairman of the Equal Employment Opportunity Commission
- William M. Brown (businessman) (born 1963), American businessman, CEO of Harris Corporation
- William Brown (headmaster) (1914–2005), British headmaster
- Sir William Richmond Brown, 2nd Baronet (1840–1906), English landowner
- Sir William Brown (civil servant) (1893–1947), English civil servant
- William Charles Langdon Brown (1931–2024), British banker
- William Roger Brown (1831–1902), British industrialist and philanthropist
- William Tatton Brown (1910–1997), English architect
- William Hoile Brown, New Zealand shipbuilder and local politician
- Willy Brown, victim of the Omaha race riot of 1919
- Bill Brown (rancher) (1855–1941), American rancher

== Characters ==
- William Brown, the main character in the Just William series
- Billy Brown of London Town, a character featured on London Transport posters
- Billy Brown (Coronation Street)

== Other uses ==
- William Brown (ship), American ship which struck an iceberg and sank on April 19, 1841
- USS William H. Brown, a steamer acquired by the Union Navy during the American Civil War
- William Brown Library and Museum, historic building in Liverpool, England
- William Brown Street, Liverpool

== See also ==
- Bill Brown (disambiguation)
- Billy Brown (disambiguation)
- William Browne (disambiguation)
- Will Brown (disambiguation)
- Willie Brown (disambiguation)
- William Broun (disambiguation)
- Miss Willie Brown, an American country music duo
- Willie Browne (1936–2004), Irish soccer player
- Jerome Brown (Willie Jerome Brown, III, 1965–1992), American football defensive tackle
