= Liam Brown =

Liam Brown may refer to:

- Liam Brown (footballer) (born 1999), Scottish footballer
- Liam Brown (novelist) (born 1983), English novelist

== See also ==
- Liam Browne, Irish racehorse trainer
- Willie Brown (disambiguation)
- William Brown (disambiguation)
- Bill Brown (disambiguation)
- Billy Brown (disambiguation)
