= Bill Brown =

Bill Brown may refer to:

== Sportspeople ==
- Bill Brown (American football) (1938–2018), American football running back
- Bill Brown (American football quarterback) (1917–2011), professional player for the Brooklyn Dodgers (NFL)
- Bill Brown (linebacker) (1936–1989), American football player in 1960 Boston Patriots season
- Bill Brown (runner) (1925–2018), American relay runner
- Bill Brown (outfielder) (1893–1965), American baseball player
- Bill Brown (baseball coach) (born 1957), American college baseball coach
- Bill Brown (basketball, born 1922) (1922–2007), American professional basketball player
- Bill Brown (basketball, born 1951) (1951–2023), American basketball coach at California University of Pennsylvania
- Bill Brown (cricketer) (1912–2008), Australian cricketer
- Bill Brown (footballer, born 1882) (1882–1949), Australian rules footballer for Geelong
- Bill Brown (footballer, born 1902) (1902–1985), Scottish footballer
- Bill Brown (footballer, born 1906) (1906–1981), Australian rules footballer for Hawthorn
- Bill Brown (footballer, born 1914) (1914–1980), Australian rules footballer for Carlton and Collingwood
- Bill Brown (footballer, born 1928) (1928–2010), English football (soccer) player
- Bill Brown (footballer, born 1931) (1931–2004), Scottish international football (soccer) goalkeeper (Dundee, Tottenham Hotspur)
- Bill Brown (footballer, born 1943), English football (soccer) player (Gillingham FC)
- Bill Brown (NASCAR driver), retired NASCAR Cup Series driver who crashed with Larry Flynn
- Bill Brown (sportscaster) (born 1947), American baseball broadcaster and member of the Texas Baseball Hall of Fame
- Bill Brown (race walker) (1878–1980), British Olympic racewalker
- Bill Brown (rugby union) (born 1943), Ireland rugby union player
- Bill Brown (boxing) (1874–1943), American boxing commissioner, referee, and promoter
- Bill Brown (boxer), Welsh boxer

== Politicians ==
- Bill Brown (New Zealand politician) (1899–1967), New Zealand politician of the National Party
- Bill Brown (American politician) (born 1944), Republican politician from Oklahoma
- Bill Brown (Australian politician) (1920–2001), Australian senator

== Others ==
- Bill Brown (critical theory) (active since 1992), American author and professor of English at the University of Chicago
- Bill Brown (composer) (born 1969), American composer
- Bill Brown (filmmaker) (active since 1994), American filmmaker and author
- Bill Brown (news anchor) (active 1982–2015), American morning news anchor for WJAC-TV
- Bill Brown (rancher) (1855–1941), American rancher

== See also ==
- Billy Brown (disambiguation)
- Brown (surname)
- Will Brown (disambiguation)
- William Brown (disambiguation)
- Willie Brown (disambiguation)
