= 187th Division =

187th Division may refer to:

- 187th Division (People's Republic of China)
- 187th Infantry Division (German Empire)
- 187th Infantry Division (Wehrmacht), Germany, later the 187th Reserve Division
- 187th Rifle Division, Soviet Union

== See also ==
- List of military divisions by number
- 187th Brigade (disambiguation)
- 187th Regiment (disambiguation)
- 187th (disambiguation)
