= 187th Brigade =

187th Brigade may refer to:

- 187th (2/3rd West Riding) Brigade, United Kingdom
- 187th Infantry Brigade (United States)
- 187th Signal Brigade, United States

== See also ==
- 187th Regiment (disambiguation)
