= William Browne =

William Browne may refer to:

== Government and politics ==
- William Browne (mayor of the Calais Staple) (1410–1489), Lord Mayor and Merchant of the Staple of Calais, France
- Sir William Browne (died 1514), Lord Mayor of London
- Sir William Browne (died 1507), Lord Mayor of London
- William Browne (judge) (1737–1802), justice of the Massachusetts Superior Court of Judicature
- William Browne (MP for Haslemere), English politician who sat in the House of Commons between 1614 and 1622
- William Browne (burgess) (1630–1705), Virginia colonial planter, officer and politician
- William Browne (MP for Kerry) (1791–1876), Irish politician in the UK Parliament
- William James Browne (1815–1894), pastoralist and politician in South Australia
- William Browne (New South Wales politician) (1842–1916), Australian politician
- William M. Browne (1827–1883), soldier and cabinet member of the Confederate States of America
- William Alfred Browne (1831–1904), British civil servant
- William Joseph Browne (1897–1989), Newfoundland and Canadian politician
- William Browne (Irish politician) (fl. 1930s), Irish Fianna Fáil politician
- W. H. Browne (William Henry Browne, 1846–1904), gold miner and member of the Queensland Legislative Assembly
- Willie Parau Browne (William Parau Browne, 1884–1957), Cook Islands businessman and politician

== Sports ==
- William Browne (cricketer) (1898–1980), Australian cricketer
- Willie Browne (1936–2004), Irish football player
- Horsey Browne (William F. Browne, 1903–1931), Irish rugby player
- Bill Browne (William Edward Browne, 1902–1948), Australian rules footballer

== Other people ==
- William Browne (poet) (c. 1590–c. 1645), English poet
- William Browne (physician) (1692–1774), English physician
- William George Browne (1768–1813), British traveller
- William Phineas Browne (1804–1869), American lawyer and coal mining pioneer
- William A. F. Browne (1805–1885), British psychiatrist
- William F. Browne (died 1867), American military photographer
- William Rowan Browne (1884–1975), Australian geologist
- William Denis Browne (1888–1915), British composer, pianist, organist and music critic (last name is Denis Browne, though he is sometimes incorrectly referred to as "William Browne")
- William D. Browne (fl. 1940s), U.S. Army officer who discovered Nazi membership files
- William Washington Browne (1849–1897), former slave and Union soldier
- William Browne (priest) (1800–1877), Irish-born Anglican priest in Australia

== See also ==
- William Brown (disambiguation)
