= William J. Brown =

William J. Brown may refer to:

- William J. Brown (architect) (died 1970), American architect
- William J. Brown (boxing) (1874–1943), American boxing commissioner, referee, and promoter.
- William J. Brown (Indiana politician) (1805–1857), member of the Indiana House of Representatives
- William J. Brown (Ohio politician) (1940–1999), Ohio Attorney General
- William Jethro Brown (1868–1930), Australian jurist and professor of law

== See also ==
- William Brown (disambiguation)
- William Joseph Browne (1897–1989), Canadian politician in the Newfoundland House of Assembly and the Canadian House of Commons
