= Billy Brown =

Billy Brown may refer to:

== People ==
- Billy Brown (footballer, born 1900) (1900–1985), English professional footballer
- Billy Brown (footballer, born 1910) (1910–1993), footballer who played in the Football League
- Billy Brown (footballer, born 1950), Scottish football player and coach
- Billy Brown (Irish musician) (1943–1999), Irish musician and artist, and member of The Freshmen
- Billy Brown (Australian footballer) (born 1942), former Australian rules footballer who played in the VFL
- Billy Brown (actor) (born 1970), American actor
- Billy Brown (athlete) (1918–2002), American track and field triple jumper, long jumper, and sprinter
- Billy Ray Brown (born 1963), former American golfer
- Billy Brown (halfback), American football halfback
- Billy Brown (tight end) (born 1993), American football tight end
- Billy Brown (singer) (born 1944), member of American rhythm and blues band Ray, Goodman & Brown
- Billy Aaron Brown (born 1981), American actor

== Songs ==
- "Billy Brown", a song from the Mika album Life in Cartoon Motion
- "Billy Brown", song from the Third Day album Wire

== Characters ==
- Billy Brown of London Town, character featured on London Transport posters
- Billy Brown (Coronation Street)

== See also ==
- Bille Brown (1952–2013), Australian actor
- Bill Brown (disambiguation)
- William Brown (disambiguation)
- Will Brown (disambiguation)
- Willie Brown (disambiguation)
