= Sketchman =

English musician (born 1988)

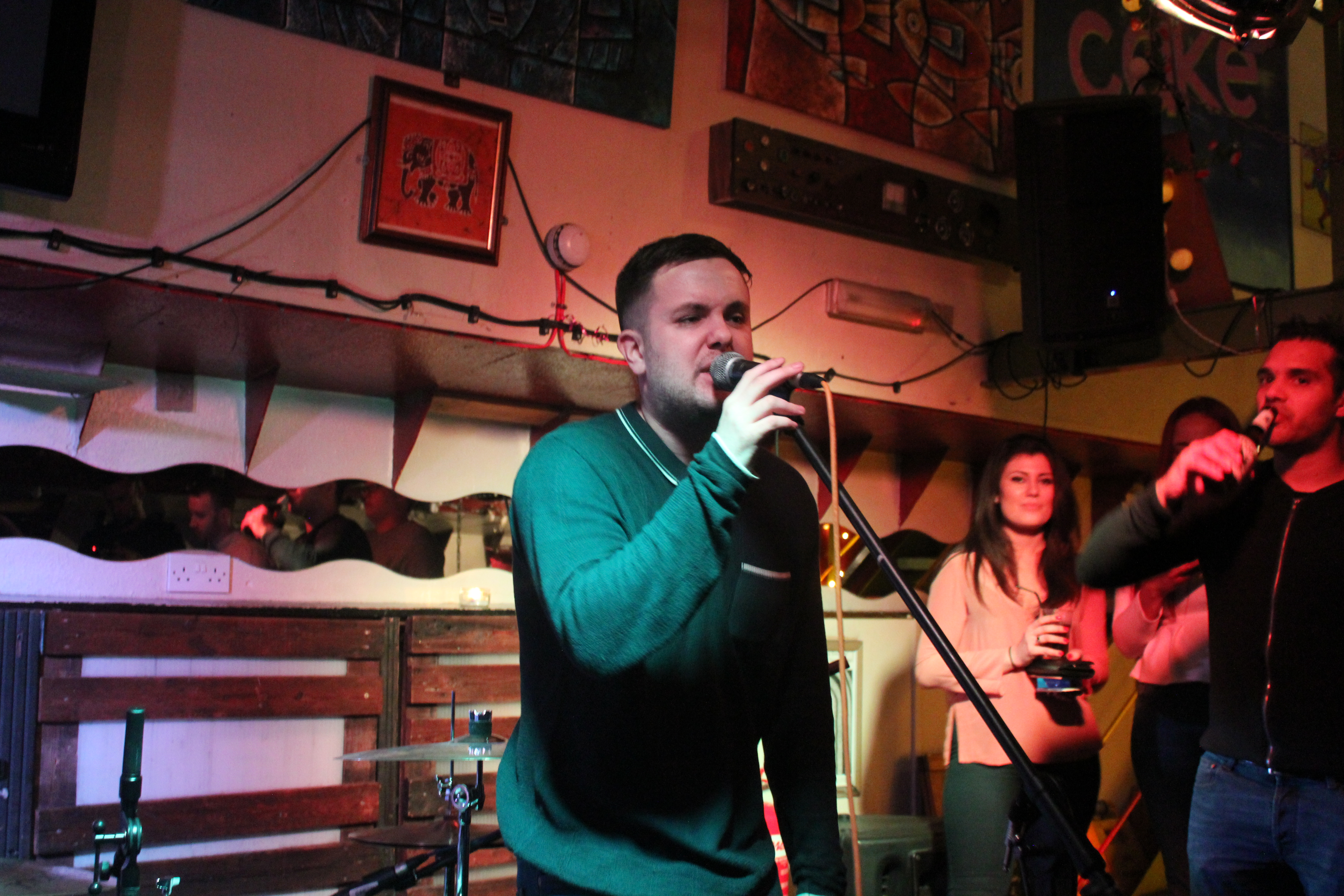
- Sketchman performing near the River Thames (2015)

Background information
- Born: Charles Hazell; 15 October 1988 (age 37); Sutton, London, England
- Genres: Grime, dubstep, alternative hip hop
- Occupations: Recording artist, songwriter, record producer, musician
- Instruments: Vocals, loop station, sample pad, guitar
- Years active: 2007–present
- Label: Uncle Albert (Independent)
- Website: sketchmanmusic.co.uk

Charles Hazell (born 15 October 1988), better known by the stage name Sketchman, is a British recording artist, songwriter, record producer and musician, originating from Sutton, London.

His first works of notability were 2 mix-tapes entitled The Workz of Art: Vol 1 & 2, released in 2007 and 2008, as physical CDs, in independent record shops.

A second phase of notable works were released during 2009–2012, in the form of digital downloads. These were entitled The Final Draft, The Art of War, Nuclear Fallout, and Breakdown respectively. During this time, Sketchman set up his own record label called Uncle Albert Records, to distribute across all online music stores.

Sketchman released a single in April 2013, entitled Rain, as another digital download.

After a year-long hiatus during 2014, Sketchman returned in Summer 2015, announcing the release of a new single Paramount on 28 August, from a new forthcoming album Nothing Is Enough. He then followed this up with the second single The Light on 1 July 2016.

Throughout his time in music, Sketchman has maintained a public profile, with support from nationwide radio stations, regional television and mainstream press, together with appearances on community radio and features from leading internet blogs.

== Music career ==
=== 2007–2008: The Workz of Art Vol. 1 and 2 ===
In 2007, Sketchman recorded the first volume of The Workz of Art, a 20-track mix-tape called The Poisoned Palette, using largely his own instrumentals. Copies of the CD were distributed to independent record shops such as Uptown Records (Soho), Mixing Records (formerly Big Apple Records, Croydon), and Banquet Records (Kingston). Many tracks received nationwide airplay on the Kiss FM Dangerous Minds show, and a track entitled Get You Down (produced by Swindle) was selected for Ras Kwame's show on BBC Radio 1Xtra, for the 100% Homegrown Cuts feature. The song was praised for its positive message.

In 2008, Sketchman released the second volume in the series, another 20-track mix-tape called The Bigger Picture. The CD was again distributed to independent record shops, and received further support from Dangerous Minds on Kiss FM. During this year, Sketchman also hosted Mixing Radio on Friday evenings, at Mixing Records (Croydon), alongside leading dubstep artists such as Shivers, Lost and Kromestar.

=== 2009: The Final Draft ===
In 2009, Sketchman began recording at Danny C's Aim studio in Bermondsey. Widely regarded as a hub for creative networking, here Sketchman was able to write and record music with many notable emcees from the UK grime scene. His own collective of Sutton-native artists, and the resultant project, were dubbed The Final Draft, before the release as a free digital download on Christmas Day.

A track called Grime Kid received nationwide radio support from MistaJam on BBC Radio 1Xtra, who invited listeners to share their opinions with him live on air. After much positive feedback, MistaJam and the producers themselves praised the track and Sketchman for his persistence.

Sketchman was again selected for Ras Kwame's Homegrown Cuts feature on BBC Radio 1Xtra, with track Sun Goes Down. DJ Crissy Criss stood in for Ras, and Sketchman's pre-recorded telephone intro was aired over the beginning of the song, allowing him to plug the project. This track was also passed on to Tom Robinson, who played it on his Introducing show on BBC Radio 6.

A track entitled Emergency Room featuring Killa P (Roll Deep) also featured on the project Credit Crunch, and became Sketchman's first song to be distributed in HMV music stores nationwide.

Track Gun Fingers featuring P Money received community support from DJ Vectra on Rinse FM, and internet blog GRM Daily. It was selected for a compilation album for UK Runnings called Grimewatch Vol.3, the second song to be distributed in nationwide HMV stores. This would also spawn an interview for Rago Magazine, and another collaboration with affiliated Wolverhampton rapper Late on the track Mic Controllers. It became the third of Sketchman's recorded works to be distributed nationwide in HMV, as part of the album UK Rapscallion.

During this year, Sketchman was also featured as a whole-page spread in leading youth lifestyle magazine RWD, distributed in JD Sports stores nationwide.

Other notable collaborations during The Final Draft include Ice featuring Loudmouth, Tomorrow featuring Lee Brasco, Fruit Machine featuring Purple and Iron Soul, I'm Bad featuring Dogzilla, and Bad Boy featuring Deverlish.

Sketchman was also invited to Rinse FM to host and showcase the project, alongside producer ZDot, on DJ Bigbeatz' show.

=== 2010: The Art of War and Uncle Albert Records ===
In 2010, Sketchman recorded The Art of War, his first project to be distributed via Ditto Music to all online stores. He set up an independent record label called Uncle Albert Records, to coincide with a blog of the same name curated by freelance music writer Tomas Fraser.

Sketchman continued to receive support from Rinse FM, as well as other community radio stations such as Flex FM, DeJaVu and Westside Radio. He was also featured regularly on music blogs, and started to direct and shoot his own internet music videos.

Extensive collaborative work took place this year, including that with fellow BBC Introducing artist A Me B (Amy Burns), from Wigan. The track Legacy, from project Get Me Out This Box and produced by Sketchman, was played a number of times on BBC Radio Manchester to positive response.

Sketchman also hosted and performed at many live events. Stand-out shows include those of J-Sweet's Stay Clever promotion, alongside DJ Logan Sama, and further afield in the city of Leeds at Oh My Days alongside Flirta D.

=== 2011: Nuclear Fallout ===
Sketchman spent much of 2011 working closely with dubstep producer Mista Noisy. With 24-hour access to the Noisy Recordings studio, a huge number of tracks were made, enough for the Nuclear Fallout mix-tape, and what became the main body of Breakdown. Tracks were again given support from underground and community radio stations, including Luton's Jamrock radio, and added to various online compilations and mixes.

A short video blog series was recorded, documenting different aspects of operations behind the scenes. This was added to the Sketchman YouTube channel, and included footage from event bookings, studio sessions and music video shoots.

=== 2012–2013: Breakdown and Rain ===
In 2012, Sketchman released a large free digital download on Christmas Day, of 40+ songs and radio snippets, entitled Breakdown.

Having taken an interest in live instruments, he started gigging with acoustic guitar in January 2013, and was invited to the BBC Introducing Masterclass in March, to meet notable DJs and artists including Angel, Wretch 32, Charlie Sloth, DJ Target and MistaJam.

In April 2013, Sketchman announced plans to release a single entitled Rain. The track was selected to be part of the Introducing playlist on BBC Radio 1Xtra and received positive feedback and support from many of the station's high-profile DJs, including Nick Bright, Ace, Trevor Nelson, MistaJam and Adele Roberts. On the last day of the play listing, Sketchman had a live telephone interview with DJ Target to discuss Breakdown, Rain and new music, during which he mentioned the new project Nothing Is Enough. The Guardian published an article shortly thereafter entitled Acoustic grime artist Charles Hazell Sketchman aims to go from Carshalton to stardom.

Throughout the rest of 2013, Sketchman continued to play sets for some of London's most notable live music promotions. These were filmed and added each month to his YouTube channel. The last gig of the year was in New York City, with Hush Tours, where he was invited to freestyle on the tour bus as it moved between boroughs, alongside Rahiem from Grandmaster Flash and The Furious Five.

=== 2014: Hiatus ===
During 2014, although Sketchman did not release any music, he continued to work behind the scenes, writing and recording new album Nothing Is Enough.

To maintain interest and exposure, he entered a number of competitions, including Launching People by Samsung. Sketchman's late entry was a video of a live performance, of the album's title track Nothing Is Enough, created using live looping. The video climbed to the top region of the online voting chart, but was eventually unsuccessful in its attempts to win a chance to work with Paloma Faith. The story was again covered by The Guardian.

=== 2015: Paramount & Nothing Is Enough ===
In Summer 2015, Sketchman released a new track entitled Paramount, available from all online stores from 28 August, as the first single from album Nothing Is Enough. The song features singer-songwriter Chloe Ray. To date, the single has received support from numerous community radio stations, and Tom Robinson on BBC Radio 6.

The music video was released on 14 July on the Vevo network. It was played on London Live TV, during Sketchman's first live television interview.

Sketchman also announced a string of live tour dates to coincide with the release, including shows in London, Liverpool, Sheffield, Leicester, Leeds, Bristol and Brighton.

=== 2016: The Light ===
In Summer 2016, Sketchman released The Light as his second single from Nothing Is Enough on 1 July. The song is produced by emerging artist Dusty Cutz, and has again received support from many community radio stations, and BBC Introducing on BBC Radio Surrey.

The music video was released on 29 April on the Vevo network, and premiered with Fortitude Magazine. It was also supported by leading youth entertainment platform Linkup TV.

During The Light release campaign, Sketchman has also recorded live freestyle performances for platforms such as BBC Radio 1Xtra, and DJ Charlie Sloth's Fire In The Streets.

== Discography ==
Workz of Art Volume 1: The Poisoned Palette

- Released: 2007
- Format: CD
- Label: White
- Writer: Sketchman
- Producer: Sketchman, Swindle
- Tracks: Twenty

Workz of Art Volume 2: The Bigger Picture

- Released: 2008
- Format: CD
- Label: White
- Writer: Sketchman
- Producer: Sketchman, Cinematic, Cotti
- Tracks: Twenty

The Final Draft

- Released: 2009
- Format: Digital Download
- Label: White
- Writer: Sketchman
- Producer: Sketchman, Cinematic, Mista Noisy, High Octane, Loudmouth, Cotti, Zdot, Iron Soul, Ripperman, Sketch'E, Vinyl Vixens, Deverlish
- Tracks: Twenty Two

"Emergency Room" (ft. K-Debt & Killa P) from the album Credit Crunch

- Released: 2009
- Format: CD
- Label: Warrior Recordings, Roll Deep Recordings
- Writers: Sketchman, K-Debt, Killa P
- Producer: High Octane

"Gun Fingers" (ft. P Money) from the album UK Runnings Presents: Grimewatch Vol. 3

- Released: 2010
- Format: CD
- Label: Grime Village
- Writers: Sketchman, P Money
- Producer: Cinematic

"Mic Controllers" from the album UK Rapscallion

- Released: 2010
- Format: CD
- Label: Wolftown Recordings
- Writers: Late, Manny Moscow, Tuberculosis, Iron Braydz, Supar Novar, Streets, Reload, K9, Genesis Elijah, Blazin, Hicks, Sketchman, Serocee, Creamo, Jai Boo

The Art of War

- Released: 2010
- Format: Digital Download
- Label: Uncle Albert Records
- Writer: Sketchman
- Producer: Sketchman, A2, Teeza, Zdot, Sketch'E, Mista Noisy
- Tracks: Seventeen
- Bonus tracks: One

"Do It To Death" from the album The New Wave Vol.1

- Released: 2010
- Format: Digital Download
- Label: White
- Writers: D Capital E, Sketchman
- Producer: Zdot

Nuclear Fallout

- Released: 2011
- Format: Digital Download
- Label: Uncle Albert Records
- Writer: Sketchman
- Producer: Sketchman, Mista Noisy
- Tracks: Thirteen

Breakdown

- Released: 2012
- Format: Digital Download
- Label: Uncle Albert Records
- Writer: Sketchman
- Producer: Sketchman, Mista Noisy
- Tracks: Forty Five
- Singles: "Rain"

"Rain" from the album Breakdown

- Released: 2013
- Format: Digital Download
- Label: Uncle Albert Records
- Writer: Sketchman
- Producer: Sketchman, Mista Noisy

"Fling Ya Hands Up" from the album UK Runnings Presents: Estate Life Vol. 3

- Released: 2014
- Format: Digital Download
- Label: UK Runnings
- Writers: Tricksta, Reload, Serocee, Grizzly, Sketchman
- Producer: Tricksta

"Nebula" from the album 100 Grime Instrumentals Vol. 4

- Released: 2014
- Format: CD
- Label: Marxmen Dubs
- Writer: Sketchman
- Producer: Sketchman

"Paramount" (ft. Chloe Ray) from the album Nothing Is Enough

- Released: 2015
- Format: Digital Download
- Label: Uncle Albert Records
- Writers: Sketchman, Chloe Ray, Sam NSQ, Danny C
- Producer: Sketchman

"Paramount" from the album Nothing Is Enough

- Released: 2015
- Format: Official Music Video
- Director: Chas Appeti

"The Light" from the album Nothing Is Enough

- Released: 2016
- Format: Digital Download
- Label: Uncle Albert Records
- Writers: Sketchman, Dusty Cutz, Danny C
- Producer: Dusty Cutz

"The Light" from the album Nothing Is Enough

- Released: 2016
- Format: Official Music Video
- Director: Charlotte Regan
