= William Broun =

William Broun may refer to:

- William Leroy Broun (1827–1902), President of the Agricultural and Mechanical College of Alabama
- Sir William Broun, 9th Baronet (1804–1882), of the Broun baronets
- Sir William Broun, 10th Baronet (1848–1918), of the Broun baronets
- Sir William Windsor Broun, 13th Baronet (1917–2007), of the Broun baronets

== See also ==
- William Brown (disambiguation)
- Broun (surname)
