= David Langdon =

English cartoonist and illustrator (1914–2011)

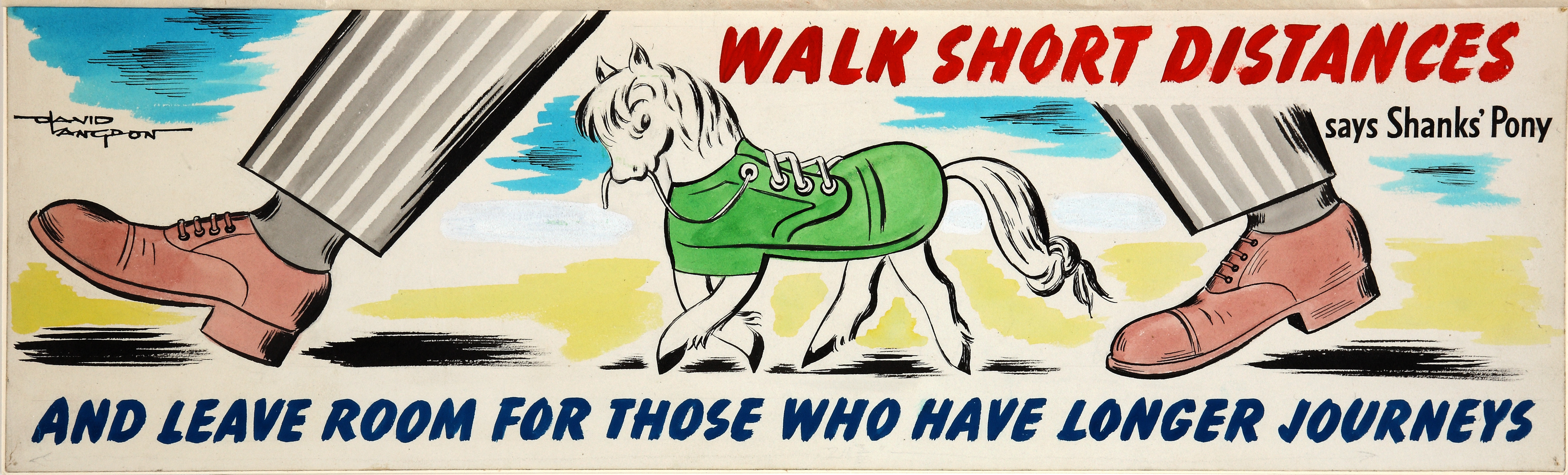
Wartime poster by David Langdon

David Langdon OBE (24 February 1914 – 18 November 2011) was an English cartoonist. Born in London, he worked from 1931 in the Architects Department of London County Council, working on his professional qualifications while drawing cartoons as a sideline. In 1937 he was invited to contribute to Punch.

He joined the London Rescue Service in 1939 and the Royal Air Force in 1941. He produced the Billy Brown of London Town advertisements and was editor of the RAF Journal from 1945 to 1946.

After the war he became a freelance cartoonist, contributing to Punch, The New Yorker and the Daily Mirror. He also had a long association with Wycombe Wanderers football club, where he was a Life Member. His cartoons have featured on official Christmas cards sent by the club.

Langdon died on 18 November 2011 after a period of ill health. He is survived by his wife, three children and eight grandchildren.
