= Joseph McGann =

British grime and dubstep record producer and DJ (born 1988)

- Also known as: Kahn, Gorgon Sound (with Neek)
- Born: 1988 (age 37–38); London, England
- Origin: Bristol, England
- Genres: Dubstep, grime, experimental
- Occupations: Producer, DJ
- Years active: 2006–present
- Labels: Deep Medi Musik, Bandulu records, Hotline Recordings, Young Echo, Peng Sound, Punch Drunk

Joseph McGann (born 1988), who goes under the aliases of Kahn and Gorgon Sound, is a British grime and dubstep record producer and DJ of the Bristol underground scene. Alongside frequent collaborator Neek, he founded record label Bandulu and is a member of Young Echo.

His initial forays into DJing started with his night Sureskank, which was one of the first nights that brought dubstep and grime to Bristol. More recently, he has put on nights as a part of the experimental Bristol collective Young Echo. He has had multiple releases on the dubstep label Deep Medi Musik, including "Dread", "Abattoir" and the Volume 1 LP with Gantz and Commodo. He contributed a mix CD as well as a label residency to London's Fabric nightclub.

His love of music grew from his parents Paul McGann and Annie Milner taking him to music festivals and playing a variety of musical styles around the house, from punk to reggae.

== Discography ==
Release	Label	Format	Year
Altar	A Future Without	Digital	2010
Like We Used to/Helter Skelter	Punch Drunk	12"/Digital	2011
Way Mi Defend/Azalea	Box Clever	12"/Digital	2011
Illy/Tehran	Punch Drunk	12"/Digital	2011
Backchat/Dubchat (with Neek)	Hotline Recordings	12"	2012
Margeaux	Idle Hands	12"	2012
Dread	Deep Medi Musik	12"/Digital	2012
Percy/Fierce (with Neek)	Bandulu Records	12"	2012
Kahn	Black Box	12"/Digital	2013
Chevy/Thief in the law (with Neek)	Bandulu records	12"	2013
Kahn.Commodo.Gantz. Volume One	Deep Medi Musik	12"/CD/Digital	2015
Abattoir	Deep Medi Musik	12"/Digital	2015
Bandulu EP (with Neek)	Bandulu Records	12"	2015
Backchat/Tun Up remixes (with Neek and Jus Now)	Hotline Recordings	12"	2015
HLM Dubplate (with Bandulu Gang)	HLM Dub Studio	12"	2015
