= 187th Signal Brigade =

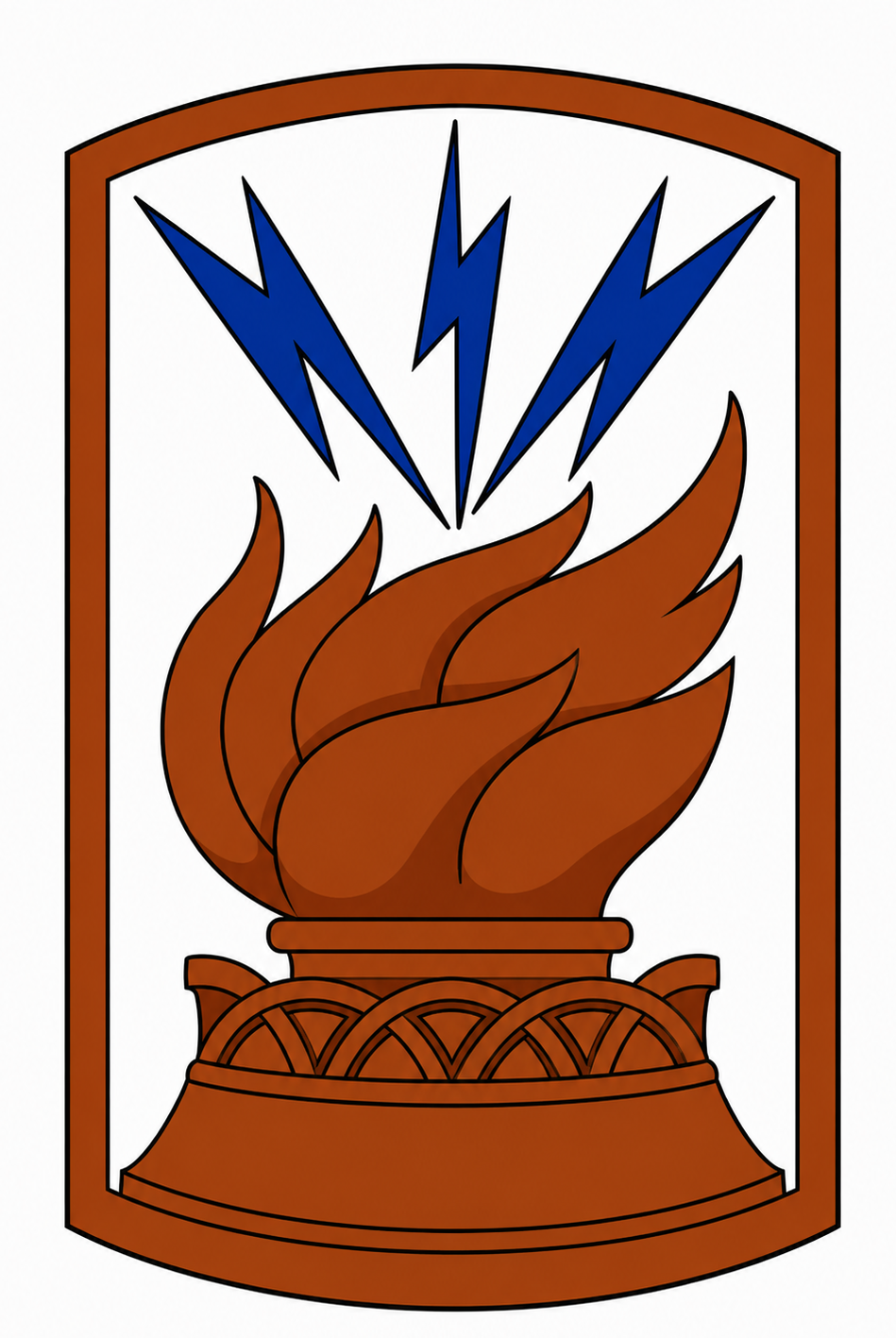
- Active: 1968-1996
- Country: United States
- Branch: Army National Guard
- Role: Signal
- Size: Brigade
- Garrison/HQ: Whitestone, New York
- Motto: Ne Desit Virtus (Let Valor Not Fall)
- Engagements: Civil War; Bull Run; Manassas; Antietam; Fredericksburg; Chancellorsville; Gettysburg; The Wilderness; Spotsylvania; Virginia 1861; Virginia 1862; Virginia1863; World War I World War I streamer Northern France; World War II; Normandy (Assault Wave); Northern France; Rhineland; Ardennes-Alsace; Central Europe

Insignia
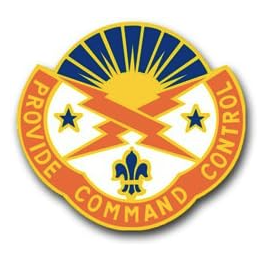
- 187th Signal Brigade DUI

The 187th Signal Brigade was a unit of the New York National Guard until August 1996. The unit has a long lineage dating to 1848 as G Company (Columbia Rifles) of the New York State Militia. The unit fought in the Civil War as part of 71st New York State Militia in 1861 and was mustered out in 1864. It participated in 11 campaigns including: Bull Run, Manassas, Antietam, Fredericksburg, Chancellorsville, Gettysburg, The Wilderness, Spotsylvania, Virginia 1861, 1862 and 1863.

In 1898 it was assigned to the 14th Regiment and was federalized for Mexican Border service in 1916. I was again called into service for World War I in 1917 and redesignated 2nd Pioneer Infantry. It earned two more campaign streamers - World War I without inscription and Northern France.

After the war it continued to serve with the 14th Regiment including being reorganized as Howitzer Company in 1927 and Headquarters Company in 1939. In 1940, it was redesignated as Headquarters Battery, 187th Field Artillery Regiment, 93rd Infantry Brigade. It was called into federal service in 1941 and reorganized in 1943 as Headquarters and Headquarters Battery, 187th Field Artillery Group, earning five campaign streamers: Normandy (Assault Wave), Northern France, Rhineland, Ardennes-Alsace and Central Europe.

After the war it was reorganized several times but continued to be the Headquarters and Headquarters Battery. But in May 1968, the unit would change again from artillery to signal as the 187th Signal Group. The unit was federalized on April, 19 1979 during the New York State correction officers' strike running all operations of the Green Haven Maximum Security Prison - Stormville, New York.

In 1987, the Group was redesignated as 187th Signal Brigade until its deactivation August 31, 1996.
