= Will Brown =

Will Brown may refer to:

- Will Brown (basketball) (born 1971), American basketball coach
- Will Brown (sport shooter) (born 1991), American sport shooter
- Will Brown (racing driver) (born 1998), Australian racing driver

== See also ==
- Willie Brown (disambiguation)
- William Brown (disambiguation)
- Bill Brown (disambiguation)
- Billy Brown (disambiguation)
