= 187th =

187th is the ordinal form of the number 187. 187th or One hundred and eighty-seventh may also refer to:

- A fraction, 1/187, equal to one of 187 equal parts
- 187th Brigade (disambiguation)
- 187th Division (disambiguation)
- 187th Regiment (disambiguation)

== See also ==
- July 6, 187th day of the year in a standard year
