= John J. Phelan (boxing) =

American boxing commissioner (1872–1946)

John James Phelan (June 2, 1872 – January 24, 1946) was an American boxing commissioner and military officer who served as chairman of the New York State Athletic Commission and was a Major General in the New York Army National Guard.

== Early life ==
Phelan was born on June 2, 1872, to John and Ellen Kingsley Phelan. From 1886 to 1895 he worked as a stock clerk for Arnold Constable & Company. He then worked for Carl Gutmann Co., which manufactured women's underwear. He started as a salesman and rose the company, serving as its European buyer, general manager, and president before retiring in December 1939.

== Military service ==
In 1895, Phelan enlisted in the New York Army National Guard as a private in Company G of the 69th New York Infantry Regiment. On July 11, 1916, as the 69th Regiment was leaving to fight in the Mexican Border War, Phelan, then a Lieutenant Colonel, was found physically unfit and relieved of his command by Major General Leonard Wood. Phelan's removal was appealed to United States Secretary of War Newton D. Baker, who upheld Wood's decision. Phelan was permitted to rejoin 69th in 1917 after an operation corrected his disability. Following his reinstatement, Phelan was promoted to Colonel and served as commander of the 69th, which was redesignated the 165th Infantry Regiment. During World War I he served as the commander of the 69th Regiment of the New York Guard. He returned to the 165th Infantry Regiment after the war. In 1926 he was promoted to brigadier general and put in command of the newly formed 93rd Infantry Brigade. He retired on June 3, 1936, when he reached the statutory retirement age of 64. He received a brevet promotion to Major General.

== Boxing ==
In 1923, Governor Al Smith appointed Phelan, William J. McCormack, and D. Walker Wear to the newly formed state boxing licensing committee. In 1926, Phelan, as chairman of the licensing committee, was instrumental in prohibiting Jack Dempsey vs. Gene Tunney from taking place in New York, as the committee was already considering a proposed fight between Dempsey and Harry Wills. The fight instead took place in Philadelphia. He also blocked a Barney Ross–Jimmy McLarnin fight on the ground that Lou Ambers was the logical challenger. In 1927 the licensing committee was disbanded and its duties were absorbed by the New York State Athletic Commission.

In 1930, Secretary of State Edward J. Flynn appointed Phelan to a seat on the athletic commission. He succeeded George E. Brower, who had been appointed Kings County District Attorney. Phelan had been supported for the position by New York City Mayor Jimmy Walker and Tammany Hall leader John F. Curry and was chosen over the John H. McCooey-backed David F. Soden. In 1930, the commission voted 2 to 1 to recognize Max Schmeling as world heavyweight champion, with Phelan and James Farley voting in favor of recognizing Schmeling. The third commission member, William Muldoon believed that the fight between Schmeling and Jack Sharkey should have been ruled a no contest instead of a disqualification victory for Schmeling and opposed recognizing him as champion. In 1933, Phelan was tasked with investigating the death of Ernie Schaaf, who died following a bout with Primo Carnera. Phelan's inquiry found that no violations of the state's boxing rules and regulations had occurred in the Carnera–Schaaf fight and that "it would have been highly improbable to detect" the illness (meningitis) that killed Schaaf during the pre-fight medical examination.

In 1933, Phelan succeeded Farley, who resigned from the board to become United States Postmaster General, as chairman of the New York State Athletic Commission. In 1934, Phelan reversed the decision of the Tony Canzoneri–Cleto Locatelli bout after he discovered the ring announcer had misread one of the judge's ballots. In 1935, Phelan and fellow commissioner Bill Brown ordered a reversal of the decision in the Vince Dundee–Eddie Risko fight. The fight was originally declared a victory for Sisko, with Judge Sidney Scharlin and referee Jed Gahan voting in favor of Sisko and the other judge, Jack Britton, voting in favor of Dundee. Phelan, who was sitting at ringside, immediately performed an inspection of the ballots and found that Britton gave seven to Dundee and three to Risko and Scharlin scored five rounds for Dundee with four to Risko. Phelan, Brown, and Scharlin conferred and the decision was reversed in favor of Dundee. In 1936, Phelan and Brown voted to cancel a bout between Hank Bath and Red Burman after they received a telegram from the secretary of the California State Athletic Commission reporting that two of Bath's fights in that state were "questionable". That same year, Phelan was able to convince Mike Jacobs to hold the Joe Louis vs. Max Schmeling fight in New York City. In 1937 the commission fined Joe Gould and James J. Braddock $1,000 for canceling Braddock's scheduled fight with Max Schmeling. In February 1938, the commission suspended the licenses of manager Joe Jacobs and boxer Tony Galento for Galento's failure to fight Harry Thomas. Galento's license was restored within a few months, however the commission refused to license Jacobs for the Louis-Schmeling rematch later that year. At the 1938 convention of the International Boxing Federation, Phelan was instrumental in defeating a proposal that would require all championships to have the approval of a special committee on which Americans would have minority representation. In 1939 he and Brown sued boxing promoter James J. Johnston for libel over Johnston's allegations that the two commissioners had a financial interest in the Twentieth Century Sporting Club. The suit ended when Johnston made a statement denying that he had used the word "financial" and added that he never meant to accuse Phelan and Brown of "malfeasance or misfeasance of any kind". Following Joe Louis's knockout victory over Billy Conn, Phelan undertook a search for the judge's ballots, which had gone missing after the fight. On June 20, 1941, Phelan announced that he had founded the ballots and that they showed the Conn had been ahead on points prior to being knocked out. Due to a shortage of boxers during World War II, Phelan recommended lowering the minimum age for boxers to 16.

== Personal life ==
In 1907, Phelan married Mary Irene Bradley. They had five children – Lillian, Helen, Jeanne, Marie, and John Jr. In 1934, Helen Phelan married Jack Mara, son of New York Giants owner Tim Mara. In 1921, Mary Phelan died while on a family vacation in Paris.

On September 27, 1932, Phelan married Angela Steiner Mattern, a widow and the mother of John Jr.'s friend and United States Military Academy classmate Richard Mattern, in Cold Spring, New York. Phelan's fellow commissioner William J. Brown served as the best man and Brown's wife was the maid of honor. Phelan was the stepfather of three children from Mattern's first marriage. In 1939, Phelan moved to a large suite at 333 West End Avenue, where he resided for the remainder of his life. John J. Phelan Jr. and Richard H. Mattern were killed in action during World War II.

== Later life ==
Phelan's term as chairman expired on December 31, 1944, and Governor Thomas E. Dewey chose to appoint Eddie Eagan rather than reappoint Phelan. Phelan was allowed to remain on the board, as Dewey appointed him to fill the unoccupied seat previously held by D. Walker Wear. In 1945, Phelan returned to the business world as vice president of the Mara Fuel Company. Phelan died on January 22, 1946, at Polyclinic Hospital following a long illness. His funeral at the Church of the Blessed Sacrament was attended by 800 mourners. He was buried at Calvary Cemetery.
