= Supercinema =

2013 philosophy book by William Brown

Supercinema: Film-Philosophy for the Digital Age
- Published: 2013, Oxford, England
- Publisher: Berghahn
- Pages: 198
- ISBN: 978-1782389019

Supercinema: Film-Philosophy for the Digital Age is a 2013 film-philosophy academic textbook by William Brown, Senior Lecturer in Film, and Honorary Fellow at the Department of Media, Culture and Language at the School of Arts at the University of Roehampton, London, United Kingdom.

== Production ==
The book was published by Berghahn Books in 2013.

== Synopsis ==
Brown combines film philosophy, film theory, psychology, and scientific principles in discussing cinema and reality.

In his review, Robert Sinnerbrink discusses the book's treatment of cognition and digital cinema, including long takes and single-shot films and their implications for perspective and framing.

== Critical reception and influence ==
The book has been described as "challenging" by Francesco Sticchi.

The concepts put forward in the book are further advanced in Paul Virilio's 2016 book Drone Age Cinema.
