= Deep Medi Musik =

British dubstep label

- Founded: 2006
- Founder: Mala
- Genre: Dubstep
- Country of origin: United Kingdom
- Location: London, England
- Official website: deepmedi.com

Deep Medi Musik is a British dubstep label founded in 2006 by artist Mala. The label featured releases by Benny Ill, Digital Mystikz, Compa, Goth-Trad, Kahn, Kromestar, Loefah, Mark Pritchard, Pinch, Silkie, Sir Spyro, Skream, and Truth. As a tradition, every artist's debut release on the label has a portrait of them drawn by artist Tunnidge.
