= William Phineas Browne =

- Born: July 9, 1804; Waltham, Massachusetts
- Died: January 13, 1869 (aged 64)

William Phineas Browne (July 9, 1804 – January 13, 1869), a lawyer by profession, was a leading pioneer in the coal mining business in Alabama, credited with operating that state's first systematic underground coal mines prior to, and during, the American Civil War.

Browne's coal mines, located near Montevallo, Alabama, were under contract to the Confederate Navy during the Civil War. The Confederate war effort was also supplied by Browne's iron furnace located on the Little Cahaba River until it was destroyed by Union forces led by General James H. Wilson in April 1865 .

Browne was born in Waltham, Massachusetts in 1804. He was the son of Phineas Browne, a veteran of the Revolutionary War, and a descendant of William Bradford, the first governor of the Plymouth Colony. Browne migrated to Alabama in 1831 to join his cousin to work on a construction contract for the Tennessee Canal at Muscle Shoals. Browne soon sold his shares in this contract and moved on to New Orleans to work on a canal from the new American Quarter to Lake Pontchartrain. Browne was involved in subsequent business ventures including a steamship company operating between New Orleans and Mobile, general merchandise stores, corn mills, lumber, coal, and iron.

Browne also invested heavily in real estate in Mobile, Alabama, along with Henry Hitchcock, Alabama's first Attorney General and later Chief Justice of the Alabama Supreme Court. In addition to his business adventures, Browne was involved in Alabama politics, serving in the Alabama Legislature in 1845, representing the Mobile district, and attended the 1860 Democratic National Convention as a delegate.
