= Liam Brown (novelist) =

British writer

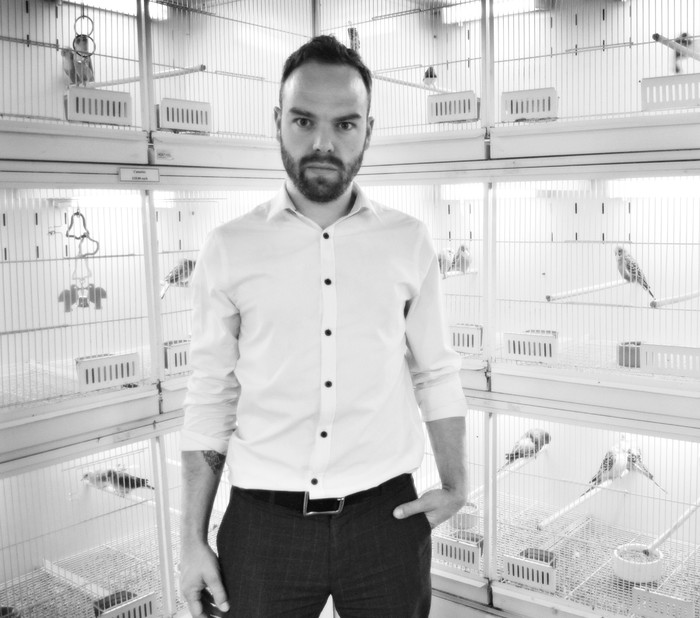
- Born: 26 April 1983 (age 43); Birmingham, England
- Occupation: Writer
- Writing career
- Period: 2013–present
- Genre: Literary fiction
- Notable works: Fanfiction, Evergreens, Skin, Broadcast

Liam Brown (born 26 April 1983) is the author of Fanfiction, “a subversive, darkly comic thriller” published by Orion Fiction. His debut novel, Real Monsters, was published in 2015 by Legend Press. His second novel, Wild Life, was published in 2016 and his third, Broadcast, was published in 2017. In 2019 his fourth novel, Skin, was shortlisted for the Guardian's Not the Booker Prize. His fifth novel, Evergreens, was awarded the Contemporary Romantic Novel of the Year 2024 by the Romantic Novelists' Association.

== Early life and education ==
Brown was born and grew up in Birmingham, England. After leaving school, he spent "five years working a series of increasingly dead-end jobs", before attending the University of Greenwich. In 2010 he received the de Rohan Scholarship, enabling him to study for an MA in creative writing at Oxford Brookes University.

== Writing ==
In 2013, Brown’s novel Fade To White was shortlisted for the 2013 Luke Bitmead Bursary. Brown’s debut novel, Real Monsters, was published in 2015 by Legend Press. A short, sharp satire on the war on terror, author Ben Myers described Real Monsters as "a memorable and moving portrait of the futility of 21st century conflict". His second novel Wild Life, "a compelling, chilling investigation into the dark instincts of masculinity", was published in 2016, followed by Broadcast, a retelling of Faust, in 2017. His fourth novel, Skin, was published in 2019, followed by Evergreens in 2023. In 2025, Orion Fiction won a three-way auction to publish his sixth novel, Fanfiction.

== Works ==
- Real Monsters (Legend Press, 2015)
- Wild Life (Legend Press, 2016)
- Broadcast (Legend Press/Penguin Random House Australia, 2017)
- Skin (Legend Press, 2019)
- Evergreens (Legend Press, 2023)
- Fanfiction (Orion Fiction, 2027)
