= Kromestar =

- Also known as: Iron Soul, Dark Knight, Droid, Immortal One, Bad Influence
- Born: Rajpal Singh Kalsi; 27 December 1982 (age 43)
- Origin: London, England
- Genres: Dubstep, Grime
- Occupations: Producer, DJ
- Years active: 1997 - Present
- Labels: Dubstar, Deep Medi Musik, Origin Audio, Cosmic Bridge, Soul Music, Library Music, Nebula Music Group, SYSTEM MUSIC

Rajpal Singh Kalsi, better known as Kromestar, is a British Sikh dubstep and grime record producer from South London.

== Biography ==
He is well regarded in both dubstep and the broader UK dance scene. Kromestar is most well known for his first album, My Sound which cemented him as a seminal producer in the genre. He later released his second album 2011 Colourful Vibrations. In December 2013, the album Tears of Joy - inspired by the death of his son - was released, with proceeds going to charity. His style is known to vary quite dramatically, from the mechanised sound of his dubstep releases to the smoother sounds of sample-based grime, and an overall aesthetic of concise production. In addition to his own labels Bass 'N' Love and Dub Steppers Recordings, he has released on Mala's Deep Medi Musik, Om Unit's Cosmic Bridge, V.I.V.E.K.'s SYSTEM MUSIC and many other prominent labels in the scene.

== Albums ==
- My Sound (2009)
- The Other Syde (2009)
- Colourful Vibrations (2011)
- Tears of Joy (2013)
- MCMLXXXII Part One (2016)
- The End To Something (2023)

== Selected albums and EPs ==
- Soul Music (as Iron Soul)
- Art of Music EP (as Iron Soul)
- Levels R High EP (as Iron Soul)
- Eye of the Tiger EP (as Iron Soul)
- Parallel Sounds EP (2011)
- 7th Wonder EP (2013)
- Inner Dynamics (2013)
- Holy Structures (2013)
- Bit Work (2014)
- Alpha Seven (2018)
