= William Brown (sailor) =

- Born: Unknown
- Military career
- Allegiance: Great Britain
- Branch: Royal Navy
- Service years: 1815
- Rank: Landsman
- Unit: HMS Queen Charlotte

William Brown (birth name unknown) was a Black woman who joined the Royal Navy in the early nineteenth century. It is undisputed that she was a sailor of HMS Queen Charlotte, but historians have reached varying conclusions about her service record.

== Two contrasting sources ==
The muster list of HMS Queen Charlotte shows that William Brown joined the crew on 23 May 1815, and was discharged on 19 June that year for "being a female". The record gives her place of origin as the Caribbean island of Grenada, states her age as 21 years old, and rates her as a "landsman", the lowest grade of adult crew member in the Royal Navy at the time, intended for personnel who were not fully trained seamen.

A more detailed narrative appeared in The Times on 2 September 1815 (swiftly reprinted in The Annual Register), claiming that her service aboard the Queen Charlotte was more extensive and more prestigious:

Amongst the crew of the Queen Charlotte, 110 guns, recently paid off, is now discovered, was a female African, who served as a seaman in the Royal Navy for upwards of eleven years, several of which she has been rated able on the books of the above ship by the name of William Brown, and has served for some time as the captain of the fore-top, highly to the satisfaction of the officers. She is a smart well formed-figure, about five feet four inches in height, possessed of considerable strength and great activity; her features are rather handsome for a black, and she appears to be about 26 years of age. Her share of prize money is said to be considerable, respecting which she has been several times within the last few days at Somerset-place. In her manner she exhibits all the traits of a British tar, and takes her grog with her late mess-mates with the greatest gaiety. She says she is a married woman; and went to sea in consequence of a quarrel with her husband, who, it is said, has entered a caveat against her receiving her prize money. She declares her intention of again entering the service as a volunteer.

This report indicates that she had been born around 1789, joined the Royal Navy in her mid-teens about 1804, and served aboard the Queen Charlotte during its previous commission as flagship of the Channel Fleet in 1813–1814. It also claims that she was a highly capable sailor: an able seaman was a fully qualified member of the crew, who could steer with the ship's wheel, and navigate through shallow waters using a sounding lead as well as going up the rigging and out along the yardarms to adjust the ship's sails, while the "captain of the fore-top" was the leader of one of the elite teams of "topmen" who were the most skilled sailors aboard the ship, working high above the deck to control the upper sails of the foremast. To be captain of the fore-top aboard the flagship of Great Britain's premier battle fleet was to be recognized as one of the most capable sailors in the entire Royal Navy.

== Two contradictory interpretations ==
Historians have offered varying reactions to the claim that a Black woman from the Caribbean held this prestigious and demanding position. Suzanne J. Stark, David Cordingly and Philip Haythornthwaite have taken the report seriously, whereas Rachel Boser has dismissed it as nothing more than a legend, and her interpretation has been followed in several recent works.

These different interpretations reflect contrasting readings of disjointed evidence concerning the woman who called herself William Brown. The statement that she had been on board Queen Charlotte for "several" years implies that she had been aboard during the ship's previous period of active duty in 1813–14, and if there is any truth to her alleged appointment as captain of the fore-top, it would have taken place in these years—but none of the scholars directly discuss the crew records from this period. After the Peace of Paris in 1814, the Queen Charlotte was placed in dock for a refit and the crew was disbanded as part of a general demobilization of military personnel, but in 1815, the ship was rapidly brought back to active duty due to the start of the War of the Seventh Coalition in 1815, requiring the crew to be reassembled.

It was at this point that the woman calling herself William Brown undisputedly joined Queen Charlotte in 1815. The rating as landsman is anomalously low for a skilled sailor (and would mean a wage cut of nearly 50% for a former top-captain), but the ranking of crew members was controlled by the first lieutenant, and a highly qualified recruit might be assigned this rank due to a clash of personalities, or simply if the officer had no personal knowledge of their true skill level.

It is true that the verified career of the woman serving under the name of William Brown was restricted to a few weeks, but in July 1815, a few weeks after she was dismissed from the ship, a sailor named William Brown transferred into the crew from the Cumberland. This William Brown is listed as being from Edinburgh, and aged 32, rated as an able seaman, and remained with the crew until the ship was paid off again in August 1815 due to an enduring peace between Britain and France.

Boser rejects the identification of these two sailors named William Brown and regards the Cumberland sailor as simply a white Scotsman, but Stark and Cordingly implicitly accept that the Black woman from Grenada had successfully re-enlisted. They further state that she rejoined Queen Charlotte once again on 31 December 1815 (when the ship was once again reactivated as Channel Fleet flagship), and was promptly appointed as "captain of the forecastle", in charge of the seamen handling the fore course, jibs and bowsprit sails (Boser accepts that this was the same sailor who had enlisted in July, still identifying as a 32-year-old native of Scotland, but states that this enlistment was actually aboard a separate ship, HMS Queen). On 29 June 1816, this sailor transferred to HMS Bombay, the flagship of Rear-Admiral Sir Charles Penrose, but this is as far as the trail of evidence can be followed, as subsequent records from Bombay are not available.

== The first Black woman in the Royal Navy ==
Regardless of whether she was one of the most skilled sailors aboard the British flagship during the Napoleonic Wars, or, as Boser argues, just "an ordinary individual" who briefly enlisted in the navy for unknown reasons, and who has been confused by modern researchers with a white male sailor of the same name, the undisputed enlistment of the woman from Grenada aboard Queen Charlotte in May and June 1815 still makes Brown the first known Black, female individual to serve in the Royal Navy.

== Sources see also Joan Grant Women, Migration and Media, Trentham, 1996. ==
- "Jane Tars:The Women of the Royal Navy" by Susan Lucas from Aboutnelson.co.uk, Retrieved 12 February 2006
