= Billy Brown (halfback) =

- Brown from The Mirage 1961

No. 25
- Position: Halfback

Personal information
- Born: c. 1940
- Listed height: 5 ft 10 in (1.78 m)
- Listed weight: 194 lb (88 kg)

Career information
- High school: Holdenville (OK)
- College: Oklahoma State (1957); Cameron JC (1958); New Mexico (1959-1960)

Billy Brown was an American football halfback. He played college football for Oklahoma State (1957), Cameron Junior College (1958), and New Mexico (1959-1960). During the 1959 season, he ranked first nationally with an average of 7.79 yards per carry and fifth nationally with 740 rushing yards.

== Early life ==
Brown was raised in Holdenville, Oklahoma. He played both football and basketball at Holdenville High School. He once scored all 26 points for Holdenville in a November 1956 football game.

== College football ==
Brown played college football for Oklahoma State in 1957, Cameron Junior College in 1958, and New Mexico in 1959 and 1960. During the 1959 season, he ranked fifth nationally among major college football players with 740 rushing yards on 95 carries. His average of 7.79 yards per carry was tops in the country. Brown also tallied 131 yards on eight punt returns (16.37 yards per return) in 1959.

Brown had been listed as a sophomore in 1959, but he was reclassified as a senior in April 1960; it was discovered at that time that Brown had played freshman ball at Oklahoma State in 1957.

During the 1960 season, Brown suffered a series of injuries, including a right knee injury. He played in only three games, gaining 216 yards for an average of six yards per carry.

== Professional football ==
In January 1961, Brown signed a one-year contract to play professional football with the Calgary Stampeders of the Canadian Football League.
