= William Brown (footballer, born 1885) =

Scottish footballer

Personal information
- Date of birth: 1885
- Place of birth: Newmilns, Ayrshire, Scotland
- Date of death: 1962 (aged 76–77)
- Place of death: Los Angeles, CA
- Position: Forward

Youth career
- Newmilns

Senior career*
Years	Team	Apps	(Gls)
1905–1906	Partick Thistle	2	(0)
1906	→ Ayr Parkhouse (loan)		
1906	→ Ayr Parkhouse (loan)		
1906–1907	Vale of Leven	22	(16)
1907–1909	West Ham United	20	(4)
- * Club domestic league appearances and goals

William Brown (1885–1962) was a Scottish footballer that played for Partick Thistle, Vale of Leven and West Ham United.

Born in Newmilns in Ayrshire, Brown played for his local club before joining Partick Thistle in August 1905, for the start of the 1905–06 season. In January 1906, he and teammate Adam McCall were temporarily transferred to Ayr Parkhouse. Brown made two Scottish Football League appearances for Partick Thistle, a home game against Motherwell on 28 October 1905, and against Third Lanark on 6 Jan 1906 at inside right. He was temporarily transferred to Ayr Parkhouse once more in March 1906, and played in a Glasgow League game for Thistle, against Clyde on 12 May 1906, playing at inside left.

Brown joined Vale of Leven for the 1906–07 season, scoring 16 goals in his one season at the Alexandria club.

Brown transferred to London club West Ham United in 1907. Although generally at home as an inside left, Brown appeared in all of the forward positions for West Ham. He made his debut on 14 September 1907 against Swindon Town, and made 18 Southern League appearances for the club in his first season. His four goals for West Ham came in the form of two braces. The first earned the Irons a 2–2 draw against Leyton, who were at the time a professional club, and the second was in a 4–2 home victory over Southampton. The following season saw just two appearances for Brown, and he left the club in 1909.
