= William Brown (footballer, born July 1885) =

Scottish footballer

Personal information
- Date of birth: 29 July 1885
- Place of birth: Dundee, Scotland
- Date of death: 25 September 1915 (aged 30)
- Place of death: Pas-de-Calais, France
- Position(s): Outside-right

Senior career*
Years	Team	Apps	(Gls)
–1913	Arbroath		
1913–1914	Dundee Hibernian	14	(2)
- * Club domestic league appearances and goals

William Brown (29 July 1885 – 25 September 1915) was a Scottish professional footballer who played as an outside-right in the Scottish Football League for Dundee Hibernian.

== Personal life ==
Brown served as a private in the Black Watch during the First World War. He was killed on the Western Front on 25 September 1915 and is commemorated at the Loos Memorial.

== Career statistics ==
Appearances and goals by club, season and competition
Club	Season	League			Scottish Cup		Other		Total	
Club	Season	Division	Apps	Goals	Apps	Goals	Apps	Goals	Apps	Goals
Dundee Hibernian	1913–14	Scottish Division Two	5	0	0	0	9 (Note: Appearances in Scottish Qualifying Cup)	2	14	2
Career total			5	0	0	0	9	2	14	2
