= William Brown (goalkeeper) =

English footballer

Personal information
- Full name: William Brown
- Place of birth: Nottingham, England
- Position: Goalkeeper

Senior career*
Years	Team	Apps	(Gls)
1889–1892	Notts Rangers		
1892–1894	Nottingham Forest	22	(0)
1894–1895	→ Notts County (loan)	1	(0)
- * Club domestic league appearances and goals

William Brown was an English footballer who played in the Football League for Nottingham Forest and Notts County.
