= William Brown (author) =

British academic, author and filmmaker

William Brown Ph.D
- Education: University of Oxford
- Known for: Writing, filmmaking
- Notable work: Supercinema, Non-Cinema: Global Digital Filmmaking and the Multitude
- Website: https://begstealborrowfilms.com/

William Brown is a Vancouver based, British academic, author and filmmaker of low and zero-budget films. He is most notable for his 2013 non-fiction book Supercinema.

== Education and academic career ==
Brown obtained his Ph.D. from the University of Oxford in 2007. He is currently an Associate Professor of Film at the University of British Columbia.

He previously taught at the University of St Andrews, the University of Roehampton, and NYU Abu Dhabi.

== Publications ==
=== Books ===
He is the author of the 2013 non-fiction film philosophy book Supercinema: Film-Philosophy for the Digital Age and co-author of the 2010 book Moving People, Moving Images: Cinema and Trafficking in the New Europe which influenced in Paul Virilio's 2016 book Drone Age Cinema.

Bloomsbury published his 2018 book Non-Cinema: Global Digital Filmmaking and the Multitude.

He is also the co-author of The Squid Cinema from Hell: Kinoteuthis Infernalis and the Emergence of Chthulumedia (Bloomsbury, 2018).

=== Book chapters ===
- Amateur Digital Filmmaking and Capitalism, chapter of Marx at the Movies, 2014, Palgrave Macmillan, ISBN 978-1137378606

=== Films ===
Brown has made many zero-budget or micro-budget short and feature films through his film company Beg Steal Borrow:

1. En Attendant Godard (Waiting for Godard) (Sight & Sound Films of the Year 2009)
2. Afterimages (Sight & Sound Films of the Year 2010)
3. Common Ground (Fest Film Festival 2013; American Online Film Awards Spring Showcase 2014)
4. China: A User's Manual (FILMS) (2012)
5. Selfie (2014)
6. Ur: The End of Civilization in 90 Tableaux (2015)
7. The New Hope (2015)
8. Letters to Ariadne (2016)
9. Circle/Line (East End Film Festival in 2017)
10. #randomaccessmemory (2017)
11. St Mary Magdalen's Home Movies (2017)
12. Sculptures of London (2017)
13. Clem (2018)
14. Vladimir and William (2018)
15. La Belle Noise (2019)
16. The Benefit of Doubt (2019)
17. Golden Gate (Sight & Sound Video-Essays of the Year 2020)
18. The New Hope 2 (2020)
19. This is Cinema (IndieCork Film Festival 2021)
20. App 666 (Vancouver Small File Media Festival 2024)
21. Cake and Death (DOXA Film Festival 2024)
