= William D. Browne =

Major William D. Browne is a former U.S. Army officer. He served in the postwar occupation military government of Germany, as a Major in the Third Army. He was involved in the recovery of German documents at the end of World War II.

== Report on recovery of Nazi documents ==
Browne was the author of a 1946 U.S. Army Report: "Covering the locating, safeguarding, collecting and disposition of NSDAP records during period 19 September 1945 to 21 January 1946, by the Office of Military Government for Regierungsbezirk Oberbayern." The report, which is lodged in the U.S. National Archives, describes the discovery of the Nazi Party's worldwide membership card files in May 1945 by U.S. Army Counter Intelligence Corps personnel.

The report states, "An estimated 68,000 kilos of Party records and documents of Reichsleitung SA were discovered by agents of the 45th CIC Det in a paper mill at Freimann (X-8763). Included among the papers were all Party membership cards with identification photos, documents relating to the Party, SA courts, and SA administration."

Six to seven million of these cards were moved to the Army's Munich headquarters, located in the "Reichfinanzhof" building (Reich Finance Court). Browne's report included a photo of these files.

Browne came upon the remaining files at the paper mill in September 1945. He alerted General Eisenhower's Supreme Headquarters Allied Expeditionary Force (SHAEF), which immediately ordered a major task force to organize and catalog the files. Browne's discovery received worldwide press coverage. The files subsequently became the heart of the collections of the Berlin Document Center (BDC), and were instrumental in the Allied Denazification of Germany, and in the Nuremberg War Crimes trials.

== Role of CIC Agent Michel Thomas ==
In 2000, "Test of Courage" a biography of former CIC Agent Michel Thomas gave an account of his rescue of the files in May 1945. When Thomas's account was questioned by a Los Angeles Times reporter in 2001, Thomas sued the reporter and the paper for defamation, and commissioned a private investigator to research this and other issues.

The investigator's research led to Volume XXVI of The History of the Counter Intelligence Corps. This states that the first U.S. soldier to see the files in May 1945 was Counter Intelligence Corps Agent Francesco Quaranta. However, when the investigator interviewed Quaranta's widow, she said he did not speak or read German and would not have understood what was on the cards, nor did he ever mention any role in the discovery of the files.

As of 2002, only one other Agent survived from Thomas's unit, Mr. Walter Wimer. He stated in a sworn Declaration filed in Thomas's defamation suit that there were at most six German-speaking members of the unit, including himself and Thomas, and was unaware of any other agent who claimed a role in rescuing the files.

Thomas also kept original Nazi documents that he found at the mill, including one bearing the original signature of Heinrich Himmler.

In 2002, this evidence was submitted to Robert Wolfe, a leading expert on captured German war documents from the National Archives. Wolfe concluded that Thomas was the Counter Intelligence Corps Agent who originally rescued the files in May 1945. His monograph reviewing the evidence can be found at http://www.michelthomas.org; the text is pasted into the Talk section of this article.

In 2006, Gregory Gordon, a career prosecutor at the U.S. Justice Department's Office of Special Investigations, wrote an article that also credited Thomas with the rescue of the files.
