= Compa =

British electronic musician and DJ

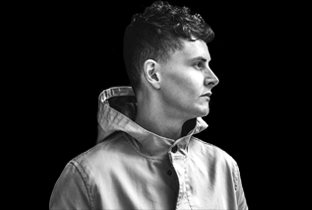

Background information
- Born: William Brown
- Origin: Manchester, England
- Genres: Dubstep, dub
- Occupation: Musician
- Years active: 2011–present
- Labels: Deep Medi Musik, CPA Records, Artikal Music, Boka Records

William Brown, better known as Compa, is a British electronic musician and DJ from Clitheroe, Lancashire, who began releasing music in 2011. Compa first rose to prominence following his self-released remix of Mavado's Dem A Talk in 2012, followed by his signing to Mala's (of Digital Mystikz) label Deep Medi Musik the same year, although he did not release his debut record for the label until 2013. In a review of the record, Boomkat described Compa as "Keeper of Dubstep's Darkest Light"

After moving to Dubai in 2021 to portray himself as a successful forex trader as WB Trading, the firm received a warning from the UK's Financial Conduct Authority (FCA) that it is an unauthorized, likely fraudulent operation whose clients are not covered by investor protection schemes.

Among signings to other labels such as Boka Records, Artikal Music and Kokeshi, the release was followed by a second record on Deep Medi Musik in 2016 titled 'Truth In Sound'. In June 2017 Compa launched his Record Label CPA Records with a collaboration with Newham Generals artist and frequent D Double E collaborator Footsie. Mixmag described the collaboration as a "hard-as-nails war dub" which "combines elements of grime and bass".

Since Compa's debut tour of North America in 2014 he has toured extensively including one tour of Australia and New Zealand and consistent UK and Europe shows including Fabric in London, UK where he played every room of the club in 2013, Skrillex's OWSLA club night at The Warehouse Project in Manchester, UK, Outlook Festival in Pula, Croatia, Echo Park festival in Shanghai, China and Webster Hall in Manhattan, New York, USA.

Compa has recorded notable DJ mixes for FACT Magazine's mix series as well as Mixmag's 'Mix Of The Week' along with achieving their 'Tune Of The Month' in their January 2014 issue. He has also been featured by Red Bull in regards to his September 2015 Asia tour and by FACT Magazine in regards to his November 2014 North America tour.

Compa has received notable international radio support from Toddla T when invited on to his BBC Radio 1 and BBC Radio 1Xtra show for a back-to-back DJ set and interview in 2016, MistaJam when asked to record a Sixty Minutes mix for his BBC Radio 1 show in 2016, Hatcha on Kiss FM, Mala during his BBC Radio 1 Essential Mix, Sir Spyro during his BBC Radio 1 Essential Mix and is also featured on Mary Anne Hobbs' BBC Radio 1 Playlist along with having his music broadcast by her regularly in 2015.

== Discography ==
=== EPs and singles ===
- Sentence/Beginning (BOKA Records, 2012)
- Afraid (Redshift One, 2012)
- Security/Cold Weather (Area Recordings, 2012)
- Kalindi/Antact (Kokeshi, 2013)
- Narabeh' (Deep Medi Musik, 2013)
- Outer Lines/Timelapse (TUBA Records, 2014)
- Let Them/Earths Orbit (BOKA Records, 2014)
- "Kingdom"/"Bass Drum Version" (Lion Charge Records, 2015)
- "Take Control feat. Fox"/"Crack Chimes" (Artikal Music, 2016)
- "Truth In Sound" (Deep Medi Musik, 2016)
- "Shaka's Truth"/"Athå Dub" (ZamZam Sounds, 2016)
- "No Hype feat. Footsie"/"In Check" (CPA Records, 2017)

=== Remixes ===
- Mavado – Dem A Talk (Compa Remix) (WX/WL, 2012)
- Reamz – Fear (Compa Remix) (WX/WL, 2012)
- Porta – Lost (Compa Remix) (Not On Label, White Label, 2012)
- Irrelevant – Moments (Compa Remix) (Kokeshi, 2013)
- Faithless – Insomnia (Compa Remix) (WX/WL, 2013)
- Floetry – Say Yes (Compa Remix) (Not On Label, Self-Released, 2013)
- Prism – Future Samba (Compa Remix) (TUBA Records, 2013)
- DJ Q – Trust Again (Compa Remix) (Local Action, 2014)
- Murda Dub (Killa Sound, 2014)
- "Stalk Of Sensimilla" (Killa Sound, 2015)
- "Bob Marley – Exodus" (Not On Label, White Label, 2015)
- "Blend Mishkin & Roots Evolution feat. Gappy Ranks – Hol Dem (Compa Remix)" (Nice Up! Records, 2015)
- Mavado – Dem A Talk (Compa Remix) *Repress With Artwork* (WX/WL, 2016)

== Sources ==
- Fact Magazine, FACT Mix 431, March 2014
- Mixmag, Mix Of The Week, May 2013,
- Fabric London, Introducing: Compa & His FABRICLIVE x Kokeshi Mix, Feb 2013,
- Outlook Festival
- BBC
