= William Anderson Brown =

American politician

William Anderson Brown (August 4, 1861 – September 26, 1940) was an American lawyer and politician.

Brown was born in Pittsburgh, Pennsylvania. He went to University of Pennsylvania and then received his law degree from University of Michigan Law School. He moved to Minnesota in 1891 and settled in Lanesboro, Minnesota and then in Winona, Minnesota. He moved to Minneapolis, Minnesota in 1906. Brown served in the Minnesota House of Representatives in 1901 and 1902 and in 1905 and 1906. He then served in the Minnesota Senate from 1937 until his death in 1940.
