= 93rd Infantry Brigade (United States) =

The 93rd Infantry Brigade was a formation of the United States Army. It was part of the New York Army National Guard from 1926 to 1940. It controlled several separate infantry regiments of the New York National Guard in the interwar period between the First and Second World Wars.

The brigade was constituted in April 1926 and made part of the New York National Guard. Its headquarters was organized in New York City and federally recognized on 2 April 1928, and assigned to the First Army on 1 October 1933. It conducted annual summer training most years at Camp Smith, Peekskill New York, from 1927 to 1939. On 1 September 1940, the headquarters was reorganized and redesignated as Headquarters and Headquarters Battery, 71st Field Artillery Brigade.

== Organization ==
- HHC, 93rd Infantry Brigade (Separate)
- HQ New York, New York 1926-1940

=== Subordinate Units ===
- 10th Infantry Regiment (New York) 1927-1940
- 14th Infantry Regiment (New York) 1926-1940
- 71st Infantry Regiment 1926-1927
- 165th Infantry Regiment 1927-1940
- 369th Infantry Regiment (Colored) 1927-1940

== Status ==
Part of the NY ARNG, the inactive HQ II Corps Artillery carries the traditions of the 71st FA Brigade.

== Commanders ==
- Brigadier General John J. Phelan January 26, 1927 – June 3, 1936
- Brigadier General Charles G. Blakeslee June 3, 1936 – August 25, 1938
- Brigadier General Alexander E. Anderson August 25, 1938 – July 17, 1940
- Brigadier General Walter A. De Lamater July 17, 1940 – August 14, 1940
- Brigadier General Joseph A. S. Mundy August 14, 1940 – September 1, 1940
