= William Brown (clergyman) =

Scottish clergyman (1766–1835)

William Brown (1766–1835) was a Scottish clergyman.

== Life ==
Brown was licensed by the presbytery of Stirling in 1791, was minister to the parish of Eskdalemuir Scotland, presented by Henry Scott, 3rd Duke of Buccleuch, and served from 1792 to 1835.

== Works ==
He was the author of Antiquities of the Jews Carefully Compiled from Authentic Sources, and Their Customs Illustrated from Modern Travels, in two volumes, with a map showing the ground-plan of the Temple (London, 1820; 2nd edition, Edinburgh, 1826). The work was compiled mostly from Latin, French, and English sources, such as Arias Montano's Aaron, Calmet's dictionary, Goodwin's Moses and Aaron, Owen's Exercitation on the Hebrews, Johannes Buxtorf's De Synagoga Judaica, and Jacob Christian Basnage's history. He borrowed much from Lightfoot's Prospect of the Temple and Temple Services, but states in the preface of his work that he takes "a wider range than Dr. Lightfoot, who professes to despise rabbinical learning."

For the improvements in the second edition Brown used the Latin translation by Surenhusius (Willem Surenhuys) of the Mishnah and several additional treatises by Maimonides and Abravanel, also from Latin translations; for his familiarity with Hebrew seems to have been limited.

== Family ==
In 1797, he married Margaret Moffat; they had three children.
