= Willie Brown =

Willie Brown may refer to:

== Sports ==
=== Association football ===
- Willie Brown (footballer, born 1900) (1900–1977), Scottish footballer (Rochdale AFC, Torquay United)
- Willie Brown (footballer, born 1922) (1922–1978), Scottish football player (Preston North End, Grimsby Town) and manager (Barrow AFC)
- Willie Brown (footballer, born 1928) (1928–2017), Scottish footballer (Forfar Athletic, Accrington Stanley)
- Willie Brown (footballer, born 1938), Scottish footballer (Accrington Stanley, Chester City, Greenock Morton)
- Willie Brown (footballer, born 1950), Scottish footballer (Newport County, Torquay United)

=== Other sports ===
- Willie Brown (American football) (1940–2019), American football Hall-of-Fame cornerback
- Willie Brown (American football, born 1942) (1942–2018), Tampa Bay Buccaneers coach
- Willie Brown (golfer) (c. 1858–?), 19th century Scottish golfer
- Willie Brown (rugby league) (born 1979), former Sydney Roosters rugby league player

== Other ==
- Willie Brown (musician) (1900–1952), American delta blues guitarist and singer
- Willie Brown (politician) (born 1934), mayor of San Francisco, 1996–2004, Speaker of the California State Assembly, 1980–1995
- Willie B. Brown (1940–2009), American politician in New Jersey
- Willy Brown, victim of the Omaha race riot of 1919

== See also ==
- Miss Willie Brown, an American country music duo
- Willie Browne (1936–2004), Irish soccer player
- Jerome Brown (Willie Jerome Brown, III, 1965–1992), American football defensive tackle
- William Brown (disambiguation)
- Will Brown (disambiguation)
- Billy Brown (disambiguation)
- Bill Brown (disambiguation)
