= Billy Brown of London Town =

Cartoon character on London Transport posters

Billy Brown of London Town was a cartoon character, drawn by David Langdon, who featured on London Transport posters during World War II. Brown's appearance was that of a City of London businessman of the time, wearing a bowler hat and pinstripe suit, and carrying an umbrella.

== Posters ==
One example of a London Underground poster showed a passenger peeling back tape placed on train windows:

On the train a fellow sits
And pulls the window net to bits
Because the view is somewhat dim,
A fact which seems to bother him.
As Billy cannot bear the sight,
He says, "My man, this isn't right.
I trust you'll pardon my correction,
That stuff is there for your protection."

One commuter replied by writing

I thank you for the information but I can’t see my bloody station.

An example of a bus poster had him saying "Kindly pass along the bus and so make room for all of us" because passengers clustered around doors. A graffiti reply read "That's alright without a doubt, but how the H–ll do we get out".

Another example of a bus poster had him waving a white object:

Billy Brown's own highway Code
For blackouts is "Stay off the Road".
He'll never step out and begin
To meet a bus that's pulling in.
He doesn't wave his torch at night,
But "flags" his bus with something white.
He never jostles in a queue,
But waits and takes his turn. Do you?

Billy Brown was also a mascot on sorties over Berlin during the war, with the advice "I trust it suffers no deflection, this stuff is for the Hun's correction" (i.e. Adolf Hitler.).

To-day's Good Deed
When you travel to and fro
On a line you really know,
Remember those who aren't so sure,
And haven't been that way before.
Do your good deed for the day
Tell them the stations on the way.

Billy Brown's good deeds were not always welcomed by some. The Daily Mail later quoted:

Some day pretty soon, by heck,
Billy Brown, I'll wring your neck.
