= Bill Brown (footballer, born 1882) =

Australian rules footballer

Personal information
- Full name: William Brown
- Born: 3 November 1882; Elmore, Victoria
- Died: 21 September 1949 (aged 66); Geelong, Victoria
- Original team: Queenscliff
- Height: 180 cm (5 ft 11 in)
- Weight: 83 kg (183 lb)

Playing career^{1}
Years	Club	Games (Goals)
1905	Geelong	1 (0)
- ^{1} Playing statistics correct to the end of 1905.

Bill Brown (3 November 1882 – 21 September 1949) was an Australian rules footballer who played for the Geelong Football Club in the Victorian Football League (VFL).
