= Bill Brown (footballer, born 1902) =

Scottish footballer

Personal information
- Full name: William Brown
- Date of birth: 2 December 1895
- Place of birth: Burnbank, Scotland
- Date of death: 1979 (aged 83–84)
- Position: Wing-half

Senior career*
Years	Team	Apps	(Gls)
1924–1925	Bellshill Athletic		
1925–1928	Coventry City	55	(0)
1928–1929	Wolverhampton Wanderers	33	(0)
1929–1931	Norwich City	50	(2)
1931	Boulton & Paul		
Total		138	(2)
- * Club domestic league appearances and goals

William Brown (2 December 1895 – 1979) was a Scottish footballer who played in the Football League for Coventry City, Norwich City and Wolverhampton Wanderers.
