= Bill Brown (footballer, born 1928) =

English footballer

Personal information
- Full name: William Brown
- Date of birth: 27 March 1928
- Place of birth: Dawdon, County Durham, England
- Date of death: May 2010 (aged 82)
- Place of death: Durham, England
- Position: Wing half

Senior career*
Years	Team	Apps	(Gls)
19??–1950	Murton Colliery Welfare	?	(?)
1950–1958	Gateshead	216	(7)
1958–1959	Berwick Rangers	3	(0)
1959–19??	Blyth Spartans	?	(?)
- * Club domestic league appearances and goals

William Brown (27 March 1928 – May 2010) was an English footballer who played as a wing half.

Brown started his career with non-league Murton Colliery Welfare before signing for Gateshead in September 1950. He scored a total of 7 goals in 238 appearances in the league and FA Cup for Gateshead. Brown moved to Berwick Rangers before playing for non-league Blyth Spartans.
