= Bill Brown (footballer, born 1914) =

Australian rules footballer, born 1914

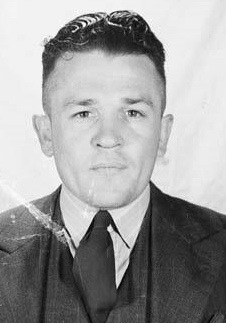
- Brown in 1943

Personal information
- Full name: Ivor Ashton 'Bill' Brown
- Born: 8 March 1914
- Died: 10 October 1980 (aged 66)
- Original team: Coburg
- Height: 178 cm (5 ft 10 in)
- Weight: 82 kg (181 lb)

Playing career^{1}
| Years | Club | Games (Goals) |
| 1940–41 | Coburg (VFA) | 24 (24) |
| 1942 | Carlton | 1 (0) |
| 1943 | Collingwood | 2 (0) |
- ^{1} Playing statistics correct to the end of 1945.

Ivor Ashton 'Bill' Brown (8 March 1914 – 10 October 1980) was an Australian rules footballer who played for the Carlton Football Club and Collingwood Football Club in the Victorian Football League (VFL).
