= Bill Brown (boxing) =

William J. Brown (January 20, 1874 – September 3, 1943) was an American boxing commissioner, referee, and promoter.

== Early life ==
Brown was born on January 20, 1874, in County Cork, Ireland. He and his widowed mother arrived in the United States on March 11, 1888, and took up residence in New York City. Brown spent his first years in the U.S. working as a delivery boy and truck driver. He also spent time at the Pastime Athletic Club, where George Bothner taught him to wrestle. In 1894 John Woods hired Brown to work as a wrestling instructor at his gym.

== Boxing ==
=== Promoter ===
Brown first became acquainted with boxing at Wood's gym and eventually trained boxers in addition to wrestlers. The gym closed in 1904 in order to make way for the Prince George Hotel. Brown then opened his own gym in Chelsea, Manhattan and began hosting fights. His success as a boxing promoter allowed him to purchase Pine Hill Farm, a health retreat and farm overlooking the Hudson River in Garrison, New York, in 1909. Brown's Gymnasium closed in 1917 when boxing was outlawed in the state.

=== Referee ===
Brown also served as a boxing referee. His notable fights included Jim Coffey vs. Frank Moran, Fred Fulton vs. Al Reich, and Benny Leonard vs. Eddie Fitzsimmons. In 1920, the boxing commission implemented a plan to rotate referees and Brown, who preferred to choose his own assignments, resigned. In 1921 he turned down the opportunity to serve as the referee for the Jack Dempsey vs. Georges Carpentier fight due to a previous disagreement with promoter Tex Rickard.

=== New York State Athletic Commission ===
In 1933, Brown was appointed to the New York State Athletic Commission. In 1934, Brown objected to allowing the Max Baer-Primo Carnera fight to take place, as he did not believe that Baer was in good enough condition to fight. He was overruled by his fellow commissioners John J. Phelan and D. Walker Wear. Baer ended up defeating Carnera by technical knockout. In 1935, Brown and Phelan ordered a reversal of the decision in the Vince Dundee–Eddie Risko fight. The fight was originally declared a victory for Risko, with Judge Sidney Scharlin and referee Jed Gahan voting in favor of Risko and the other judge, Jack Britton, voting in favor of Dundee. Phelan, who was sitting at ringside, immediately performed an inspection of the ballots and found that Britton gave seven to Dundee and three to Risko and Scharlin scored five rounds for Dundee with four to Risko. Phelan, Brown, and Scharlin conferred and the decision was reversed in favor of Dundee. Later that year, Brown objected to a proposed fight between Carnera and Ray Impelletiere on the grounds that Impelletiere was not experienced enough to fight Carnera, but was overruled by the other two commissioners. In 1936, Brown and Phelan voted to cancel a bout between Hank Bath and Red Burman after they received a telegram from the secretary of the California State Athletic Commission reporting that two of Bath's fights in that state were "questionable". In February 1938, the commission suspended the licenses of manager Joe Jacobs and boxer Tony Galento for Galento's failure to fight Harry Thomas. Galento's license was restored within a few months, however the commission refused to license Jacobs for the Joe Louis vs. Max Schmeling rematch later that year. In 1939 Brown and Phelan sued boxing promoter James J. Johnston for libel over Johnston's allegations that the two commissioners had a financial interest in the Twentieth Century Sporting Club. The suit ended when Johnston made a statement denying that he had used the word "financial" and added that he never meant to accuse Brown and Phelan of "malfeasance or misfeasance of any kind". In 1940 the commission voted to fine and suspend Al Davis after his disqualification loss to Fritzie Zivic, with Brown stating that although the commission did not have the power to suspend a boxer for life, Davis would be suspended “for the life of the commission”. The commission reinstated Davis the following year for his rematch against Zivic. Brown retired from the commission on January 1, 1943, in order to focus on his farm. He died on September 3, 1943, at his farm in Garrison. He was buried in Gate of Heaven Cemetery in Hawthorne, New York.
