= 187th Regiment =

187th Regiment may refer to:

- 187th Infantry Regiment (United States)
- 187th New York Volunteer Infantry
- 187th Ohio Infantry
- 187th Paratroopers Regiment "Folgore"
