= Roll Deep discography =

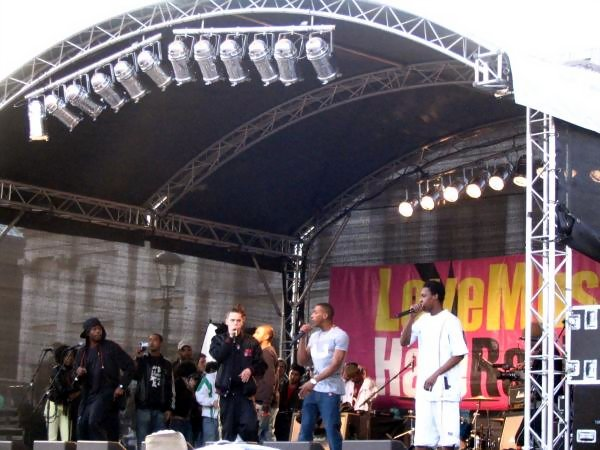
- Roll Deep performing at the Love Music Hate Racism Festival in Barnsley.
- Studio albums: 5
- Compilation albums: 1
- Singles: 5
- Music videos: 9
- Mixtapes: 5

This is a listing of official releases by Roll Deep, a MOBO Award-nominated London-based grime music collective. Their debut album, In at the Deep End, was released in June 2005. Four singles were released from the album: "Heat Up", "The Avenue", "When I'm 'Ere" and "Shake a Leg". Roll Deep Recordings is their own record label, which they use to distribute their mixtapes.

Their second album Rules and Regulations was released in 2007, followed by the release of Return of the Big Money Sound in 2008. Current member Wiley and former members Dizzee Rascal and Tinchy Stryder have gone on to be successful solo artists in the UK and even the U.S., with songs that have topped charts. The group got their first UK number 1 single with the song "Good Times" in May 2010 and the group's second UK number 1 single was "Green Light" in August 2010. Their next single was "Take Control", featuring R&B singer Alesha Dixon, which charted at number 29 on 7 November 2010.

== Albums ==
=== Studio albums ===
Title	Album details	Chart peak positions	Certifications
Title	Album details	UK	Certifications
In at the Deep End	Released: 6 June 2005; Label: Relentless Records/Virgin Records; Formats: CD, LP, digital download	50	UK: Silver
Rules and Regulations	Released: 26 March 2007; Label: Roll Deep Recordings; Formats: CD, digital download	193	
Return of the Big Money Sound	Released: 6 October 2008; Label: Roll Deep Recordings; Formats: CD, digital download	138	
Winner Stays On	Released: 8 November 2010; Label: Relentless Records/Virgin Records; Formats: CD, digital download	55	
X	Released: 1 October 2012; Label: Cooking Vinyl; Formats: CD, digital download	—	
"—" denotes an album that did not chart or was not released.

=== Compilations ===
- 2009: Street Anthems (Roll Deep Recordings)

=== Mixtapes ===
- 2004: Creeper, Vol. 1
- 2004: Creeper, Vol. 2
- 2004: Rollin’ Deeper
- 2006: Presents Grimey Vol. 1
- 2010: Say No More
- 2012: No Comment Star
- 2026: Best in the Game

== Singles ==
Year	Single	Peak chart positions			Album
Year	Single	UK	NLD	IRE	Album
2005	"The Avenue"	11	—	—	In at the Deep End
2005	"Shake a Leg"	24	—	—	In at the Deep End
2010	"Good Times" (Note: The single "Good Times" featured uncredited vocals from Jodie Connor, who appears in the accompanying music video)	1	21	13	Winner Stays On
2010	"Green Light" (Note: The single "Green Light" featured uncredited vocals from Tania Foster.)	1	34	18	Winner Stays On
2010	"Take Control" (with Alesha Dixon)	29	—	—	Winner Stays On
2013	"All or Nothing"	—	—	—	TBC

=== Other singles ===
Year	Song	Album
2005	"When I'm 'Ere"	In at the Deep End
2005	"Heat Up"	In at the Deep End
2007	"Badman"	Rules and Regulations
2007	"Celebrate"	Rules and Regulations
2007	"Racist People"	Rules and Regulations
2008	"Do Me Wrong"	Return of the Big Money Sound
2009	"Movin' in Circles" / "Club 7"	Return of the Big Money Sound
2012	"Can't Wait for the Weekend" (with Michael Gray)	X

== Guest appearances ==
Year	Single	Album
2010	"Telephone" (cover of Lady Gaga)	Radio 1's Live Lounge - Volume 5

== Music videos ==
Year	Song
2005	"The Avenue"
2005	"Shake a Leg"
2005	"When I'm 'Ere"
2005	"Heat Up"
2007	"Badman"
2007	"Celebrate"
2007	"Racist People"
2008	"Do Me Wrong" (featuring Janee)
2009	"Movin' in Circles" (featuring Kivanc)
2009	"Club 7"
2010	"Good Times" (featuring Jodie Connor)
2010	"Green Light"
2010	"Take Control" (featuring Alesha Dixon)
2010	"Swagger"
2011	"Picture Perfect"
2012	"Nasty"
2012	"Palava" (featuring Opium)
2012	"Snakes & Madders" (featuring Jammer & Opium)
