= Riko Dan =

English dancehall musician

- Also known as: Riko
- Born: Zane Benson Williams; 7 August 1976 (age 50)
- Origin: Mile End, London, England
- Genres: Grime; bashment; ragga; UK garage; dubstep; jungle; drum and bass; UK rap
- Occupation: MC
- Years active: 1994–1999; 2003–present
- Label: Epic Records UK/Sony
- Member of: Roll Deep
- Formerly of: Pay As U Go; Cemetery Warriors; Boasty Gang

Zane Benson Williams, better known by his stage name Riko Dan and formerly by the mononym Riko, is an English multi-genre MC from Mile End, East London. He rose to prominence in 2004 as a member of the pioneering grime collective Roll Deep, of which he remains an active member, and is also established in other sound system genres including bashment, jungle, and dubstep, with a prolific discography as a featured artist. He has charted on the UK singles chart with the 2024 Rudimental, Skepsis and Charlotte Plank collaboration "Green and Gold".

== Career ==
=== 1994–1999: Career beginnings, house parties and pirate radio ===
Williams has performed as an MC since the age of fifteen, when he would rap over breakbeat hardcore at house parties and later jungle on pirate radio. He used various aliases in his youth including Zany Ranks, Zany Banton and Joox before settling on Riko, in honour of a friend of the same name who died in a car crash. In 1994, his first radio show saw him MCing on Pressure FM in Bow with the station's founder, Jamie B, as the DJ. The show was on Sunday evenings, considered the best time slot of the week, and it helped Williams to gain recognition among the hyper-local audience within range of the station's transmissions. Through Pressure he also met fellow resident and future collaborator Slimzee, the co-founder of Rinse FM. He gained minor recognition as a regular performer on Rinse.

=== 2003: Pay As U Go Cartel and first collaborations ===
Williams had befriended multiple members of Bow-based UK garage group Pay As U Go at the age of about sixteen through family ties, prior to the advent of garage, and has claimed he would have likely been a member earlier had he not been incarcerated. He served time in jail for commercial robbery between 1999 and 2002, joining the group once its sound had shifted from garage to the then-unnamed grime genre and members Wiley, Flowdan and Maxwell D had left to form their own crews. In early interviews, Williams emphasised that he wanted his music to encompass many genres including grime, garage, and bashment. The months following his release were musically prolific and he recorded "about six" tracks for a Pay As U Go album, but within "about seven or eight months" of him joining the crew, it disbanded.

Williams' first credited appearance as a solo artist was on the Nasty Crew single "Cock Back" alongside Crazy Titch in 2003. He has claimed that he was asked by Marcus Nasty to join the Newham-based crew but declined due to his ties to Bow. Other songs recorded during this period included a version of Ruff Sqwad's "Pied Piper", features on the single "Poppadoms" by Rinse FM founder Wizzbit and the OT Crew song "No Games" alongside God's Gift, and a diss track over Wiley's "Igloo" instrumental directed at More Fire Crew's Neeko. Later the same year, Williams was recalled to jail, serving a further nine months in HMP Weare for a separate historical 1999 burglary. He penned an open letter to fans in Deuce Magazine, in which he claimed that "When I am out at the end of the year, my plans are to get my career back on track, finish off my album, slew Neeko again and again and again, oh yeah and get my own column in Deuce every month!"

=== 2004–2008: Roll Deep, scrapped Sony record deal and The Truth Vol. 1 ===
Williams joined Wiley and Flowdan's pioneering grime collective Roll Deep in 2004, first appearing alongside the full crew on "Flame Grilled Whopper", having already collaborated with Wiley on a solo vocal version of "Ice Rink". DJ Target produced his debut solo single, "Chosen One", which was released in 2004. He featured prominently on Roll Deep's 2004 Creeper mixtape series, in which he continued to diss More Fire Crew, and recorded another single for Target's Aim High label, "Critical" featuring Dogzilla and Discarda, which ultimately appeared on an Aim High compilation. By November 2004, he had been remanded to HMP Brixton to stand trial for another alleged offence, and recorded a verse for Lady Sovereign's "Random" remix over the phone. The case against him was dropped in late December 2004.

Williams appeared on the bonus track "Poltergeist (Remix)" on Roll Deep's 2005 debut album In at the Deep End, which entered the UK Albums Chart at number 50 and marked his chart debut. As part of Roll Deep, he also appeared on Top of the Pops, providing backing vocals on a 2005 rendition of "The Avenue". The same year, he featured on D-Power Diesle and Doctor's single "Come On", which appeared prominently on music video television channel Channel U and was listed by specialist London record store Rhythm Division at number nine on its chart in June 2005. During this period, he began recording a prospective debut solo album for Sony Music, which was to include the previously released songs "Dead That" (featuring God's Gift) and "Don't Want You Back" (featuring Breeze), but the plans for a record deal fell through when he returned to jail in 2006. His charges were dropped after eight months and many songs recorded during this period instead appeared on his debut mixtape The Truth Vol. 1, released independently via Roll Deep Recordings in 2008.

=== 2008–2013: Sleeping Giant and Rise of the Farda ===
Williams went on to appear on all Roll Deep albums except their pop rap albums Winner Stays On (2010) and X (2012), for which they involved a smaller number of members. He released his second solo mixtape, Sleeping Giant, in 2010 via Billy 'Daniel' Bunter's label, Slaughter House Rydims, through which he also released the extended plays Blowing Up Again (2010) and Warfare (2011). He had been introduced to the label by his then-manager, long-standing Rinse FM DJ Uncle Dugs. Slipmatt was credited as a mixing engineer on the lead single for Sleeping Giant, "The Phone Call". After becoming a father, he "put [music] on the backburner for a year", before featuring on the title track of Terror Danjah's 2012 album Dark Crawler and releasing a 2013 surprise mixtape, Rise of the Farda, via Logan Sama's Adamantium label.

=== 2014–2020: "Abstract" collaborations and Boasty Gang ===
In the mid-2010s, Williams began experimenting in recording what he has described as "dark" and "abstract" bass music, collaborating with record producers such as Rabit, Mumdance and Ziro. The most commercially successful of these were Wen's 2015 single "Play Your Corner", which peaked at number 96 on the UK Physical Singles Chart, and The Bug's 2016 single "Iceman", which appeared on a double single also featuring D Double E and reached number 23 on the same chart. In 2018, he released the Hard Food EP on Pinch's record label Tectonic, marking the label's hundredth release. The following year, he released a pair of grime singles, "CR7" and "Farda", via Logan Sama's labels Keepin' It Grimy and Adamantium.

Following the success of Wiley's 2019 single "Boasty", Riko was invited into his newly established dancehall crew Boasty Gang, and contributed both solo songs and crew cuts to their eponymous 2020 album, including the singles "Sorry" and "Informer". The same year, he released the Trends-produced single "Run Dem Down", previously a dubplate dating back to 2015.

=== 2020–present: Chart success and Sony/Epic Records deal ===
In 2023, Williams collaborated with Slimzee and Boylan on the single "Mile End". The song was the first release on the FWD>> record label, an offshoot of the pioneering dubstep club night launched in partnership with Sony.

In 2024, Williams featured alongside Charlotte Plank on the Rudimental and Skepsis single "Green and Gold", which peaked at number 29 on the UK Singles Chart. He appeared at Capital FM's Summertime Ball to perform the song. Other notable appearances in 2024 included a feature on K Motionz and ArrDee's "Heavyweight", which was released via Universal and reached number 30 on the New Zealand Hot Songs Chart. In July 2025, he debuted on Epic Records with a new solo single, "Bad Boi Selecta", produced by Jack Marlow. His 2024 single with Friction, Stylo G and Frisco, "Bang Bang", was included on the soundtrack of the video game EA Sports FC 26.

== Personal life and artistry ==
Riko raps in what he has described as a "Cockney yardie" style of Jamaican Patois. He enjoyed toasting along to dancehall tapes in his early teens and discovered that he could closely imitate Bounty Killer's tone; his nickname London City Warlord is a variation on Bounty Killer's, The Warlord. He honed his skills as a performer on an informal and impromptu basis at christenings and weddings, encouraged by his mother, before moving onto pirate radio. He credits dancehall culture as a "very important" influence on his style. He founded the short-lived crew Cemetery Warriors alongside fellow Caribbean-British MCs Flowdan, Killa P and God's Gift, known for their similar vocal delivery.

Riko has credited MC Buckie as the first artist he looked up to in the London pirate radio scene and has cited Capleton, The Notorious B.I.G., Eminem, Mobb Deep, and the Wu-Tang Clan among his formative musical influences. He has spoken openly about his criminal history, telling RWD Magazine in 2004 "I regret all of it", and later collaborated with Operation Trident on the video for his 2010 single "The Phone Call", which condemns gun and knife crime and was produced for their 'Stop the Guns' campaign. He also collaborated with Monkey Marc, Pinch, Ninjaman and others on the 2019 song "King Street", part of an EP with an "anti-crime and anti-violence message". He is an avid Manchester United fan and presented the NTS Radio football talk show Verbal Volley between 2015 and 2016, latterly joined by DJ Karnage and Discarda. He was involved in building the London Stadium.

== Discography ==
=== Solo ===
==== Mixtapes ====
- 2008: The Truth Vol. 1 (Roll Deep Recordings)
- 2010: Sleeping Giant (Slaughter House Rydims)
- 2013: Rise of the Farda (Adamantium Music)

EPs

- 2010: Blowing Up Again (Slaughter House Rydims)
- 2011: Warfare (with SNK) (Slaughter House Rydims)
- 2018: Hard Food (Tectonic)

==== Singles ====
As lead artist

Year	Song	Album	Label
2004	"Chosen One" (with Target)	Non-album single	Aim High Music
2010	"The Phone Call"	Sleeping Giant	Slaughter House Rydims
2018	"Vibration" (with Pinch)	Hard Food EP	Tectonic
2019	"CR7"	Non-album singles	Keepin' It Grimy
2019	"Farda"	Non-album singles	Adamantium Music
2019	"Informer"	Boasty Gang - The Album	Chasing The Art
2020	"Run Dem Down"	Non-album singles	Mean Streets
2023	"Mile End" (with Slimzee and Boylan)	Non-album singles	FWD>>
2025	"Bad Boi Selecta" (with Jack Marlow)	Non-album singles	Epic Records UK

As featured artist

Year	Title	Peak chart positions				Album
Year	Title	UK	UK Dance	UK Physical	NZ Hot	Album
2003	"Cock Back" (Nasty Crew featuring Crazy Titch and Riko Dan)	–	–	–	–	Non-album singles
2003	"Gangster" (Wizzbit featuring MC Riko)	–	–	–	–	Non-album singles
2004	"Boogeyman" (Trim featuring Riko, Wiley and Newham Generals)	–	–	–	–	Creeper Vol. 2 and Soulfood Vol. 14: Monkey Features Part 3
2005	"Roll Wid Us (Dexplicit Remix)" (Akala featuring Riko Dan, Jammer, Ears and Baby Blue)	–	–	–	–	Breath of Fresh Ears and Out Of The Blue Vol. 2: The World Will Know
2005	"Come On" (Doctor featuring Riko)	–	–	–	–	Before Surgery
2007	"Dumpling Riddim" (Chase & Status featuring Riko Dan, uncredited)	–	–	–	–	The Truth Vol. 1
2008	"Piano Riddim" (Riko Dan and The Heatwave)	–	–	–	–	Non-album singles
2008	"Knife & Gun" (Geeneus featuring Riko, Wiley and Breeze)	–	–	–	–	Non-album singles
2009	"Bullet A' Go Fly" (DVA featuring Badness, Riko, Flowdan and Killa P)	–	–	–	–	Non-album singles
2012	"Dark Crawler" (Terror Danjah featuring Riko Dan)	–	–	–	–	Dark Crawler
2012	"Lion" (Harmonic 313 featuring Riko Dan)	–	–	–	–	Non-album singles
2013	"Kingpin" (Friction and Skream featuring Scrufizzer, P Money and Riko Dan)	–	–	–	–	Non-album singles
2014	"Mad Man" (Caspa featuring Riko Dan)	–	–	–	–	500
2014	"Black Dragons" (Rabit featuring Riko Dan)	–	–	–	–	Non-album singles
2015	"Big Slug" (Pinch and Mumdance featuring Riko Dan)	–	–	–	–	Non-album singles
2015	"Play Your Corner" (Wen featuring Riko Dan)	–	–	96	–	Signals
2015	"Zone" (Jack Beats featuring Riko Dan)	–	–	–	–	Non-album single
2016	"Screamer" (Pinch featuring Riko Dan)	–	–	–	–	Screamer / No Justice
2016	"Iceman" (The Bug featuring Riko Dan)	–	–	23	–	Box / Iceman
2016	"Love$ick (Mumdance Remix)" (Mura Masa featuring ASAP Rocky and Riko Dan)	–	–	–	–	Non-album singles
2017	"Landslide" (Champion x Riko Dan)	–	–	–	–	Non-album singles
2018	"Krueger" (Trends and Boylan featuring Riko Dan)	–	–	–	–	Bedlam
2018	"Stinker" (Friction featuring Riko Dan and Tantrum Desire)	–	–	–	–	Connections
2019	"King Street" (Monkey Marc and Pinch featuring Ninjaman, Riko Dan, Killa P, Soom T, Rider Shafique and Irah)	–	–	–	–	Vital Sound
2019	"Suspect" (Boylan featuring Riko Dan)	–	–	–	–	2hrs Sleep
2019	"Sorry" (Lickle Jay featuring Wiley and Riko Dan)	–	–	–	–	Boasty Gang - The Album
2019	"Hear That?" (Cimm and Youngsta featuring Riko Dan)	–	–	–	–	Unknown Caller!!
2019	"Bushmaster" (Fonzo featuring Riko Dan)	–	–	–	–	Non-album singles
2020	"16 Bar Rally" (Morfius featuring Wiley, Ejay, God's Gift, Riko Dan and Irah)	–	–	–	–	Non-album singles
2020	"W.O.R.K." (BNKRGBY featuring Riko Dan)	–	–	–	–	Non-album singles
2020	"War Ting" (Riko Dan, Liondub, Trigon and Dave Gee)	–	–	–	–	Non-album singles
2020	"Soundboy Calling" (Lost City featuring Riko Dan)	–	–	–	–	MAPS
2021	"Casual" (Zero and Devilman featuring Riko Dan)	–	–	–	–	Non-album singles
2021	"Warlord" (Agro featuring Riko Dan)	–	–	–	–	Non-album singles
2021	"Scatter Dem" (Modulizer featuring Riko Dan)	–	–	–	–	Non-album singles
2021	"Dark & Light" (Nomine and Youngsta featuring Riko Dan)	–	–	–	–	Non-album singles
2022	"Crime Scene" (Muttley featuring Riko Dan)	–	–	–	–	Non-album singles
2022	"Tek It to Dem" (Funktional featuring Riko Dan)	–	–	–	–	Non-album singles
2022	"Babylon" (Numa Crew featuring Riko Dan)	–	–	–	–	Non-album singles
2022	"Keep It Moving" (9TRANE featuring Riko Dan)	–	–	–	–	Non-album singles
2022	"Mad Ting" (Jim Two Eyes featuring Riko Dan)	–	–	–	–	Non-album singles
2022	"Warlord" (Dominus and Daffy featuring Riko Dan)	–	–	–	–	Non-album singles
2022	"Riko's Theme" (The Heatwave featuring Riko Dan)	–	–	–	–	Non-album singles
2022	"Just Like This" (Dominus featuring Riko Dan)	–	–	–	–	Non-album singles
2022	"London's Burning" (Riddim Punks featuring King Ali Baba and Riko Dan)	–	–	–	–	Non-album singles
2023	"Dem Can't" (DJ Ridler featuring Riko Dan)	–	–	–	–	
2023	"Hot Pepper" (Agro and DJ Hybrid featuring Riko Dan)	–	–	–	–	Harrowing Sound
2023	"Off the Chain" (Chad Dubz featuring Riko Dan)	–	–	–	–	Off the Chain / Against the Grain
2023	"Rude Bwoy Ting" (DJ co.kr featuring Riko Dan)	–	–	–	–	Soundbwoy 2
2023	"Careful" (Fearful and MTWN featuring Riko Dan)	–	–	–	–	Beyond the Veil
2023	"Wicked & Wild" (Daffy x Riko Dan)	–	–	–	–	Non-album single
2023	"Talk Up" (Kasra featuring Riko Dan)	–	–	–	–	Dream Metal
2024	"Real Bad Man" (Hedo and Max Klem featuring Riko Dan)	–	–	–	–	Non-album singles
2024	"War Mi" (Solidstates featuring Riko Dan)	–	–	–	–	Non-album singles
2024	"London" (DJ Zinc featuring Riko Dan)	–	–	–	–	BASSLOVE - MORE BASS🔉MORE LOVE♥️
2024	"Original Don" (Y U QT featuring Riko Dan)	–	–	–	–	Non-album single
2024	"Green and Gold" (Rudimental and Skepsis featuring Charlotte Plank and Riko Dan)	29	7	–	16	Rudim3ntal
2024	"Heavyweight" (K Motionz and ArrDee featuring Riko Dan)	–	–	–	30	TBA
2024	"Warlord" (Buckley featuring Riko Dan)	–	–	–	–	TBA
2024	"Bran New Style" (SPK featuring Killa P, Long Range, Riko Dan and Limmz)	–	–	–	–	TBA
2024	"Gunman" (Interplanetary Criminal featuring Riko Dan)	–	–	–	–	ATW007
2024	"Bang Bang" (Friction featuring Stylo G, Riko Dan and Frisco)	–	–	–	–	TBA
2024	"The Light" (DJ Cali featuring Riko Dan)	–	–	–	–	TBA
2025	"Heavier" (Clive From Accounts featuring Riko Dan)	–	–	–	–	The Very Best of Clive From Accounts
2025	"180" (DJ Zinc featuring Riko Dan and HEIGHTS)	–	–	–	–	BASSLOVE - MORE BASS🔉MORE LOVE♥️
2025	"Sex life" (Tracey featuring Riko Dan)	–	–	–	–	Tracey
2025	"Outta Order" (Turno featuring Riko Dan)	–	–	–	–	Non-album singles
2025	"Do It Like Me" (White Pony featuring Riko Dan and Flowdan)	–	–	–	–	Non-album singles
2025	"Search Me" (Bou, Turno and skantia featuring Riko Dan)	–	–	–	–	B-Sides Mixtape

==== Guest appearances ====
Title	Year	Album
"Ice Rink (Riko Vocal)" (Wiley featuring Riko)	2003	Ice Rink 1
"Pick U R Self Up" (Wiley featuring Breeze, J2K and Riko)	2004	Treddin' on Thin Ice
"Dead" (featuring Shizzle, Flirta D and Hitman Hyper)	2004	Lord of the Mic Battle Arena Vol. 1
"Nuttin' Dat" (with God's Gift and Shizzle)	2004	Box Bloody Fresh
"Random (Menta Remix)" (Lady Sovereign featuring Riko)	2004	Random: The Remixes and Essohvee
"Cock Back V1.2" (Nasty Crew featuring Crazy Titch, Riko Dan and Bruza)	2005	Run the Road
"Critical" (featuring Discarda and Dogzilla)	2005	Aim High Vol. 2
"Top Shotta" (Chase & Status featuring Riko, Trim and Scratchy of Roll Deep)	2005	Duppy Man / Top Shotta
"Soldierz" (E.J. featuring Faction G, B Live, Riko, Royal and Syer Barz)	2006	The Soldierz EP
"Murder" (Ms Dynamite featuring Flowdan and Riko)	2006	A Little Darker
"Aligator Riddim"	2007	Aim High Vol. 3 DVD/CD Xtravaganza: Roll Deep On Tour Edition
"Find the Exit" (Durrty Goodz, Wiley, Riko and Badness)	2007	HoodFellas: A Capo's Corners Mixtape
"Play with Fire" (Wiley featuring Flowdan and Riko)	2008	Umbrella Vol. 1
"War with Me" (Killa P featuring Riko)	2008	Killer Instinct Vol. 1
"Talk Bout A'Who"	2009	Hard Day's Graft
"Patiently Waiting" (Frisco featuring J2K and Riko)	2009	Back 2 Da Lab Vol. III
"Just Me" (Flowdan featuring Riko)	2009	Original Dan
"Trousers (Remix)" (Trim featuring Riko)	2009	Monkey Features
"Yaa Zee Me Fam" (Badness featuring Riko)	2010	Lava Continues 2
"Flyest in the Room" (Nine Milli Major featuring Riko)	2010	Keep Prayin'
"Guns Alone" (Diesle featuring Riko)	2010	Another Contender 2'
"Rise the Machine" (Balistiq featuring Riko)	2011	Yardman Riddim
"Rally Up" (Discarda featuring Riko and Rapid)	2011	Lee McNaughts presents Discarda
"Stand & Deliver (N-Type Remix)" (MRK1 featuring Trigga and Riko Dan)	2012	Stand & Deliver
"Ease Off" (Fused Forces featuring Riko)	2013	Remain Unlabeled
"Warlord" (Alix Perez featuring Riko Dan)	2013	Chroma Chords
"Wickedest Man" (Chase & Status featuring Riko)	2013	Brand New Machine
"Not Fair" (Masro featuring Flowdan, Manga and Riko Dan)	2014	Yuk Riddim Versions
"Deng" (Foreign Beggars and Alix Perez featuring Riko)	2014	Modus
"Larry Hoova Freestyle" (Mystry featuring Riko Dan)	2014	Black Friday
"Snapper Riddim" (Dev79 featuring Riko Dan)	2015	Slit Jockey Records presents 10 Years of Grime
"Mosquito Riddim" (El Carnicero featuring Riko Dan)	2015	Slit Jockey Records presents 10 Years of Grime
"Speng" (Future Brown featuring Riko Dan)	2015	Future Brown
"Dun Talk" (Ziro featuring Riko Dan)	2015	Lionheart
"Copper and Lead" (Schlachthofbronx featuring Riko Dan)	2016	Haul & Pull Up
"Pepper Pot" (P Jam featuring Riko Dan)	2017	Pepper Pot: Version Excursion
"Start It" (GHSTLY XXVII featuring PK and Riko Dan)	2018	Guerrilla Tactics
"No Mercy" (Walton featuring Riko Dan)	2018	Black Lotus
"Shot Walk Inna Dem" (Scratchclart featuring Riko Dan)	2018	DRMTRK EP III
"Dutty Harry" (Trends and Boylan featuring Riko Dan)	2018	Bedlam
"Bells" (Trends and Boylan featuring Riko Dan)	2018	Bedlam
"On Sight" (Flowdan, Riko Dan, GHSTLY XXVII and Nasty Jack)	2019	Welcome to SpentShell
"Rigamortis" (Riko Dan, GHSTLY XXVII and Flowdan)	2019	Welcome to SpentShell
"Dial Up" (Harry Shotta and Erb N Dub featuring Riko Dan)	2019	Spanner in the Works
"Deh Suh (Remix)" (Yizzy featuring Killa P, Logan, Riko Dan and Scrufizzer)	2019	Welcome to Grime Street
"Suspect" (Youngsta featuring Riko Dan)	2019	2 hrs Sleep
"Hear That" (Cimm and Youngsta featuring Riko Dan)	2019	Unknown Caller
"High Power" (Spooky Bizzle featuring Riko Dan)	2019	Haunted Joyride: Version Excursion
"Duppy" (Teej and Disrupta featuring Riko Dan)	2020	Akuma
"Soundbwoy, Rudebwoy" (DJ co.kr featuring Riko Dan)	2020	Soundbwoy
"Calibre" (Substrada featuring Riko Dan)	2020	FKOFD046
"Wicked" (Sam Binga and Hyroglifics featuring Riko Dan)	2020	Wicked & Bad
"Fire Bun" (Turno featuring Riko Dan)	2020	DNA
"Hawkeye" (Nothingnice and Hayz featuring Riko Dan)	2021	Hawkeye
"Radio" (Genesis Elijah featuring Grim Sickers and Riko Dan)	2021	Vision
"Dub La Dub" (TRAKA featuring Riko Dan and Subp Yao)	2021	Maktub
"Dancehall Damager" (Y U QT featuring Riko Dan)	2021	SLP 004
"Rudeboy" (ZimZima featuring Riko Dan)	2021	Streets of Grime Vol. 2
"In the Red" (Chad Dubz featuring Riko Dan)	2022	Universal Vibrations
"Lead Spitter" (TRAKA featuring Alek Leaf, Manitou and Riko Dan)	2022	Monstas
"Ritual" (Traces featuring Riko Dan)	2023	Ritual
"Rally" (Kahn & Neek featuring Armour, IRAH, Killa P, Long Range and Riko Dan)	2023	Lupus et Ursus
"CZ Scorpion" (Ghast featuring Riko Dan)	2023	CZ Scorpion
"Chill" (Riko Dan and Logan)	2023	Grime Originals - The Album
"One By One" (Skee Mask, MJK and Riko Dan)	2023	Patchworks Vol. 1
"Confidence" (Rudimental featuring Riko Dan, Liam Bailey and Eva Lazarus)	2025	Rudim3ntal

=== With Roll Deep ===
==== Albums ====
- 2005: In at the Deep End
- 2007: Rules and Regulations
- 2008: Return of the Big Money Sound

==== Mixtapes ====
- 2004: Creeper Vol. 1
- 2004: Creeper Vol. 2
- 2010: Say No More
- 2012: No Comment Star

=== With Boasty Gang ===
==== Albums ====
- 2020: Boasty Gang: The Album
