= Rudim3ntal =

2025 album by Rudimental

Studio album by Rudimental
- Released: 22 August 2025
- Genre: Drum and bass
- Length: 46:35
- Label: Rudimental; Room Two

Rudimental chronology
Ground Control (2021)	Rudim3ntal (2025)

Singles from Rudim3ntal
- 1. "Dancing Is Healing" Released: 21 April 2023; 2. "Green & Gold" Released: 23 February 2024; 3. "Bring Me Joy" Released: 21 June 2024; 4. "Ram Pam" Released: 11 September 2024; 5. "The Feeling" Released: 25 October 2024; 6. "Vex" Released: 28 November 2024; 7. "All I Know" Released: 4 April 2025; 8. "Back to Me" Released: 11 July 2025

Rudim3ntal is the fifth studio album by English drum and bass band Rudimental, self-published by the band on 22 August 2025. The project is Rudimental's first studio album release since Ground Control (2021), as well as their first album as a three-piece band, after Amir Amor left the group in 2022.

== Track listing ==
Standard edition
No.	Title	Writer(s)	Producer(s)	Length
1.	"Confidence" (featuring Riko Dan, Liam Bailey, and Eva Lazarus)	Piers Aggett; Kesi Dryden; Leon Rolle; Liam Bailey; Beanie Bhebhe; Eva Lazarus; Zane Williams	Rudimental; Slim Typical	4:11
2.	"Green & Gold" (with Skepsis; featuring Charlotte Plank and Riko Dan)	Aggett; Dryden; Rolle; Charlotte Plank; Williams; Conor Bellis; George Conway; Joe Housley; Alexandria Eyre; Scott Jenkins	Rudimental; Skepsis; Billen Ted; Slim Typical	2:40
3.	"All I Know" (with Khalid)	Aggett; Dryden; Rolle; Khalid Robinson; Dan Caplen; Eliza Legzdina; Bellis; Conway	Rudimental; Jonny Coffer; Slim Typical	2:56
4.	"The Feeling" (with 1991, Pnau and AR/CO)	Aggett; Dryden; Rolle; Wayne Hector; Mali-Koa Hood; Bellis; Conway; Frederick Webb; Leo Stannard	Rudimental; 1991; Pnau; Slim Typical	2:48
5.	"Dancing Is Healing" (with Vibe Chemistry; featuring Charlotte Plank)	Aggett; Dryden; Rolle; Bellis; Conway; Jamie Hartman; Sam Brennan; Sarah Blanchard; Sarah Sheldrake; Tom Hollings	Rudimental; Vibe Chemistry; Billen Ted; Bellis; Slim Typical; Shapes	2:57
6.	"Nights Like These" (with Rag'n'Bone Man)	Aggett; Dryden; Rolle; Coffer; Mike Needle; Rory Graham	Rudimental; Brad Ellis; Coffer; Punctual	3:27
7.	"Back to Me" (with Jess Glynne)	Aggett; Dryden; Rolle; Chelcee Grimes; Jacob Manson; Janée Bennett; Jessica Glynne; Brennan; Hollings	Billen Ted; Kes Kamara; Bunt^{[a]}; Grimes^{[a]}	2:39
8.	"Bring Me Joy" (with Karen Harding)	Aggett; Dryden; Rolle; Felix Nyajo; Karen Harding; Brennan; Hollings	Rudimental; Billen Ted; Slim Typical; George Moore^{[a]}	2:25
9.	"Ram Pam" (featuring Mystic Marley and Flowdan)	Aggett; Dryden; Rolle; Alexandra Mills; Bellis; Conway; Holly Ankrah; Marc Viera; Mystic Marley	Rudimental; Benny Page; Slim Typical	2:56
10.	"Chop dem Down" (with 1991; featuring RoRo)	Aggett; Dryden; Rolle; Bellis; Frederick Webb; Conway; RoRo	Rudimental; 1991	2:58
11.	"London Burning" (featuring Idris Elba and Peter Xan)	Aggett; Dryden; Rolle; Bellis; Conway; Idrissa Elba; Peter Xan; Richard Osho	Rudimental; Slim Typical	3:17
12.	"Vex" (with Skepsis; featuring Mist and Popcaan)	Aggett; Dryden; Rolle; Andrae Sutherland; Brennan; Hollings; Bellis; Conway; Olivia Devine; Persia Holder; Rhys Sylvester	Rudimental; Skepsis; Slim Typical	3:18
13.	"Stamina" (featuring Venbee)	Aggett; Dryden; Rolle; Bellis; Conway; Venbee	Rudimental; Slim Typical	2:54
14.	"Where Do We Go" (featuring Liam Bailey, Eva Lazarus, and Dr Meaker)	Aggett; Dryden; Rolle; Bhebe; Clive Meaker; Lazarus; Bailey	Rudimental; Dr Meaker^{[a]}	3:43
15.	"Thank You" (featuring Liv Campbell)	Aggett; Dryden; Rolle; Fraser T Smith; Issey Cross	Rudimental; Smith	3:20
Total length:				46:35

Deluxe edition
No.	Title	Writer(s)	Producer(s)	Length
16.	"Alibi" (Ella Henderson featuring Rudimental)	Artis Ivey, Jr.; Doug Rasheed; Ella Henderson; John Morgan; Larry Sanders; Maegan Cottone; Olivia Sebastianelli; Ruth-Anne Cunningham; Stevie Wonder; Will Lansley	Rudimental; Punctual	3:04
17.	"Gone for the Night" (with Disrupta; featuring Liam Bailey, BackRoad Gee, Scrufizzer, and Shakes)	Aggett; Dryden; Rolle; BackRoad Gee; Beanie; Lazarus; Kieran Leach; Bailey; Shakes; Scrufizzer	Rudimental; Disrupta	2:18
18.	"Alive" (featuring Omar)	Aggett; Dryden; Rolle; Omar Lye-Fook; Renell Shaw; Bellis; Conway	Rudimental; Slim Typical	3:52
19.	"Break My Heart"	Aggett; Dryden; Rolle; Bellis; Devine	Rudimental; Bellis^{[a]}; L Devine^{[a]}	2:59
Total length:				58:45

=== Note ===
- ^{^[a]} signifies an additional producer

== Personnel ==
Credits adapted from Tidal.

=== Rudimental ===
- Piers Aggett – bass (tracks 1, 3), keyboards (1, 4, 5, 7, 8, 10–15, 18, 19), engineering (1), all instruments (2, 17), drums (3), programming (4, 5, 7, 8, 10–14, 19); mixing, mastering (14); organ, synthesizer (15)
- Kesi Dryden – bass (1, 4, 5, 8, 11, 12, 14, 19), keyboards (1, 19), all instruments (2, 17), synthesizer (3, 7, 11–14, 18), percussion (3), Rhodes piano (5, 8, 15), programming (7, 10, 13), piano (15)
- Leon Rolle – bass (1, 3–5, 7, 8, 10–13, 15), synthesizer (1, 4, 5, 7, 8, 11–15), all instruments (2, 17), programming (3, 19), percussion (14), synth bass (18)

=== Additional musicians ===
- Conor Bellis – electronic drums (1, 4, 11–13), all instruments (2); bass, programming (3, 19)
- George Conway – percussion (1), all instruments (2), guitar (3, 4, 11, 13), bass (4, 11), synthesizer (12)
- Beth Aggett – background vocals (1, 3, 8, 18)
- Liam Bailey – vocals (1, 14, 17), background vocals (14)
- Eva Lazarus – vocals (1, 14), background vocals (14)
- Riko Dan – vocals (1, 2)
- Beanie Bhebhe – guitar (1), drums (15)
- Sam Brennan – all instruments (2), programming (5, 7, 8); keyboards, synthesizer (5, 7); bass, piano (8)
- Tom Hollings – all instruments (2), programming (5, 7, 8), synthesizer (8)
- Charlotte Plank – vocals (2, 5)
- Skepsis – all instruments (2)
- Driia – vocals (2)
- Jonny Coffer – guitar, piano (3)
- Dan Caplen – background vocals (3)
- Liza Marie Jennings – background vocals (3)
- Bethany Bellis – strings (3)
- Khalid – vocals (3)
- 1991 – electronic drums (4, 10)
- AR/CO – background vocals, vocals (4)
- Pnau – drums, piano (4)
- Will Bloomfield – guitar (4)
- Jamie Spinks – programming (4)
- Alex Morisco-Tarr – programming (5)
- Daniel Okas – background vocals (6)
- Jack Britten – background vocals (6)
- Mike Needle – background vocals (6)
- René Miller – background vocals (6)
- Levi Wijk – bass, programming (7)
- Harry Brown – trombone (8, 14)
- Mark Crown – trumpet (8, 15)
- George Moore – keyboards, programming (8)
- Inja – background vocals (8)
- Felix Nyajo – piano (8)
- Taurean Antoine-Chagar – saxophone (8)
- Karen Harding – vocals (8)
- Nambo Robinson – trombone (10)
- RoRo – vocals (10)
- Idris Elba – vocals (11)
- Peter Xan – vocals (11)
- L Devine – vocals (12), guitar (19)
- Mist – vocals (12)
- Popcaan – vocals (12)
- Venbee – vocals (13)
- Ian Burdge – cello (14, 15)
- Sally Herbert – violin (14, 15)
- Dr Meaker – bass, programming (14)
- Eddie Lopes – bass (15, 18)
- Fraser T Smith – electronic drums (15)
- Clem Douglas – vocals (15)
- Disrupta – all instruments (17)
- BackRoad Gee – vocals (17)
- Shakes – vocals (17)
- Scrufizzer – vocals (17)
- Renell Shaw – background vocals, piano (18)
- Omar Lye-Fook – vocals (18)

=== Technical ===
- Jay Reynolds – mixing, mastering (1–13, 15, 17, 18)
- Greg Freeman – mixing (19)
- Cass Irvine – mastering (19)
- Conor Bellis – engineering (1, 4, 11–13, 19)
- Billen Ted – engineering (8)
- Ed Drewit – engineering (10)
- George Conway – engineering (13)
- Scott Barnett – engineering (15)

== Charts ==
Chart performance for Rudim3ntal
Chart (2025)	Peak position
New Zealand Albums (RMNZ)	36
UK Albums (OCC)	31
UK Dance Albums (OCC)	2
