= Heat Up =

Heat Up may refer to:

- "Heat Up", single by Roll Deep from In at the Deep End 2005, released on Shake a Leg
- Heat Up (Ken Hirai song)
- SD Heat Up!! game from Slam Dunk (manga)
