= Take You There (Jodie Connor song) =

Single by Jodie Connor featuring Busta Rhymes
- Released: 29 July 2012
- Recorded: 2012
- Genre: Synthpop, hip hop, dance, R&B
- Length: 3:05
- Label: All Around the World; Takeover Entertainment Ltd
- Songwriter(s): Trevor Tahiem Smith, Jr (Co-Lyricist); Jodie Connor (Co-Lyricist); David Dawood (Co-Lyricist)
- Producer(s): David Dawood

Jodie Connor singles chronology
"Bring It" (2011)	"Take You There" (2012)	"Talk" (2012)

Busta Rhymes singles chronology
"Pride N Joy" (2012)	"Take You There" (2012)	"#Twerkit" (2013)

Music video
- "Take You There" on YouTube

"Take You There" is a single by Barbadian British recording artist Jodie Connor. The song is a collaboration with American rapper Busta Rhymes. It was released on 29 July 2012 as a digital download on iTunes. The single was co-written by Busta Rhymes, Jodie Connor, David Dawood, and was produced by David Dawood.

== Writing and production ==
"Take You There"
A 35-second sample of "Take You There".

"Take You There" was produced by David Dawood also known as Dawood. David Dawood is the producer of Roll Deep's 2010 hit single "Good Times" that featured Connor, which reached number 1 in the United Kingdom. David Dawood is also the producer of Connor's first and second singles, "Now or Never" and "Bring It". The lyrics in "Take You There" are co-written by Busta Rhymes, Jodie Connor and David Dawood.

Following the release and prior to the release of "Take You There", Connor had been working in the studio with Roc Nation writers Makeba Riddick (Beyoncé/Rihanna) and James Fauntleroy II (Chris Brown/Leona Lewis) in preparation for her debut album, which will feature "Take You There". According to Connor, the vocals were recorded over a year, prior to the release. The song is primarily targeted to the dance music audience.

== Critical reception ==
Blogging site, musiceyz, reviewed the single to a mixed reaction. They praised Connor's "voice range and Bajan tones", stating:

"Quite a lot of kudos for Jodie Connor, getting Busta Rhymes on a track is a pretty big deal. Right from the off you hear hints of Busta, but the biggest thing that hits you is the kind of electro dance backing track that is heavily enthused with a Bollywood sound. Maybe it's a Bajan influence, Jodie Connor is a British born Bajan singer adding to the big Bajan influence of pop music driven by Rihanna and supported by Cover Drive.

The dance backing track to ‘Take You There’ is very complex though, with lots of sounds fighting each other which in parts gets just too busy and you lose your way a little. Luckily with Jodie‘s voice you get back on track as like Medusa she draws you in to her.

The lyrics and singing are simple in their composition, which is probably the reason you can and want to listen over the noisy backing track. Sadly as with most pop records featuring a Hip Hop act, you have to wait until right at the end before you hear Busta. Whilst his verse is good, it kind of feels like one of those that it's just plugged in to a track as a filler and he earns some cash.

This review may read a little negative. But in short, it is a good pop record. Jodie Connor‘s vocal is good as is her overall performance. "Take You There" is let down a bit by its backing track which overshadows the good vocals. I think I am being a bit more critical on this because I know that Jodie Connor is a great talent and we should hear more of her, rather than a complicated backing track. Busta Rhymes, as always is an added bonus, but don’t expect anything of ‘Woo-Ha’ proportions on it.

It is a good track to listen to, probably get you to have a dance and must be good because the three minutes it lasts flies by".

== Music video ==
A music video was made for the single and was filmed along the California Coast Ranges and around the beaches of California, United States. Busta Rhymes does not appear in the music video alongside Jodie Connor.

Tom Howard of NME Review gave the music video a positive review stating:

"Two things you’ll notice when watching the video for ‘Take You There’: 1) Jodie Connor, formerly of Roll Deep fame, has ditched the grime-pop in favour of dancing about on a beach in skimpy chain-mail to routine synthpop. Alarming, but not as alarming as: 2) Busta Rhymes was not invited to join her on said beach. Who doesn’t invite Busta Rhymes on holiday?.

== Track listing ==
Digital download
No.	Title	Length
1.	"Take You There" (UK Radio Edit)	3:05
2.	"Take You There" (Extended Mix)	4:05
3.	"Take You There" (Bassboy Mix)	3:34
4.	"Take You There" (Paperbwoy Mix ft. Scru Fizzer)	3:28
5.	"Take You There" (Mutant X Radio Edit)	3:56
6.	"Take You There" (Seamus Haji Radio Edit)	3:36
7.	"Take You There" (Seamus Haji Mix)	6:38
8.	"Take You There" (Mutant X & Dawood Sunset R&B Mix)	3:35
Total length:		32:07

== Release history ==
Date	Format	Label
July 29, 2012	Digital download	All Around the World & Takeover Entertainment Ltd
