= Bring It (song) =

Single by Jodie Connor featuring Tinchy Stryder
- Released: 20 February 2011
- Genre: R&B, dance-pop, Europop
- Length: 3:27
- Label: Polydor Records; Takeover Entertainment
- Songwriter(s): David Dawood (Composer); Jodie Connor (Co-Lyricist); Charlotte Kelly (Co-Lyricist)
- Producer(s): David Dawood

Jodie Connor singles chronology
"Now or Never" (2011)	"Bring It" (2011)	"Take You There" (2012)

Tinchy Stryder singles chronology
"Let It Rain" (2011)	"Bring It" (2011)	"Spaceship" (2011)

Music video
- "Bring It" on YouTube

"Bring It" is a single by Barbadian British singer-songwriter Jodie Connor, which features vocals by Tinchy Stryder. It was released by digital download on 20 February 2011 on Polydor Records straight after its first radio play, which could be a factor to how it didn't match the success of Now Or Never.

== Background ==
"Bring It" was produced by Takeover Entertainment producer David Dawood, producer of Connor's first single, "Now or Never", and the number one hit with Roll Deep, "Good Times" (2010). When writing "Bring It", Connor did not have anything in mind. She stated that the song was not really personal to her but thought that the music was uplifting and needed powerful lyrics to go with it.

"Bring It" features Connor collaborating with Tinchy Stryder. Connor had previously made a cameo appearance in the music video for Stryder's 2010 single, "In My System", which was a top ten hit in the United Kingdom. Connor stated that the collaboration originated from the two being label-mates and good friends.

== Music video ==
The music video was directed by Luke Biggins and Yasha Malekzad.

The video was filmed in the United Kingdom and is Connor's third appearance in a music video that features Tinchy Stryder after she made a cameo appearance in Stryder's 2010 promotional single for Third Strike, Gangsta?.

Jodie Connor uploaded a teaser for the music video on Monday, February 21, 2011, and then the full official music video was uploaded to Connors's official YouTube channel on Wednesday, Feb 23, 2011, at a total length of three minutes and twenty-four seconds.

=== Synopsis ===
The video starts by Tinchy Stryder introducing Jodie Connor by name, then Connor proceeds with singing the song in a dark alley wearing just her bra and tights, while being photographed by paparazzi's and then short clips of her is shown moving fast past highways, which is shown throughout the video, before the scene changes into a nightclub setting. In the nightclub scene she begins walking through two fences each to her side with people and paparazzi's taken photos of her on the otherside of the two fences, she then arrives at the dance floor and begins to dance. Tinchy Stryder makes his introduction by proceeding with rhymes over dance-poppy synths with R&B and Europop influences before joining Connor in with the dancing.

Screenshots from "Bring It"

An image of Jodie Connor in the dark alley scene wearing just her bra and tights in the music video for "Bring It".

An image of Jodie Connor and Tinchy Stryder dancing in the nightclub scene in the music video for "Bring It".

== Critical reception ==
Lewis Corner of Digital Spy gave the song a positive review stating:

Few former talent show contestants prove the phone-voting public wrong post-elimination (Rosie Ribbons and Eoghan Quigg anyone?), so you can imagine our surprise after we discovered one had managed to sneak into the charts some years later. Cue ex-Pop Idol contestant Jodie Connor - the ghetto-fab Mancunian who, after featuring on Tinchy Stryder's 'In My System' last year, is faithfully repaying the favour on her latest effort.

"Don't let them bring you down," she declares over a beefy club beat and squiggly synths which wouldn't sound out of place blaring from a boy racer's pimped out Toyota Corolla - complete with tinted windows and furry steering wheel cover, of course. As such, the result lacks the va-va-voom of a real motor - say, a Ferrari Enzo - but much like our safe and reliable VW Golf, it still manages to get the job done.

== Track listings ==
Digital download
No.	Title	Length
1.	"Bring It" (feat. Tinchy Stryder)	3:27
2.	"Bring It (Digital Dog Radio Edit)" (feat. Tinchy Stryder)	3:24
3.	"Bring It (Kryder Remix)" (feat. Tinchy Stryder)	3:34
Total length:		10:25

== Charts ==
The song debuted at 87 on the UK Singles Chart before dropping out the following week. On the 27 March 2011, the song re-entered at number 98 and rocketed to number 48 the following week. The song then leaped 11 positions to 37, Marking her second top 40 hit.

Chart (2011)	Peak position
Scotland (OCC)	32
UK Singles (OCC)	37
UK Hip Hop/R&B (OCC)	11

== Release history ==
Region	Date	Format	Label
United Kingdom	20 February 2011	Digital download	Polydor Records & Takeover Entertainment Limited
