= Trim (musician) =

British grime MC from East London

- Born: Javan St Prix
- Origin: London, England
- Genres: Grime, dubstep
- Occupation: Rapper
- Years active: 2002–present
- Label: Secluded Area of Music
- Website: trimtali.bandcamp.com

Javan Daniel Winston St. Prix, known professionally as Trim, is an English grime MC from East London and a former member of Roll Deep. Trim has an eclectic subject matter, beat selection and delivery.

== Career ==
=== 2003–2006: Roll Deep ===
Trim joined Roll Deep in 2003 and immediately began recording music with the collective. Trim was featured on Roll Deep's Creeper Vol. 1 and Creeper Vol. 2 before being featured on the highly successful debut album In At The Deep End, contributing to the hit singles "When I'm Ere" and "Heat Up". Trim then began working on Roll Deep's second album Rules and Regulations in 2006 but left the group by the time it was released in 2007, after a disagreement with fellow MC Flowdan. In 2011 Trim spoke to Huw Stephens about how leaving Roll Deep helped him find his own musical direction and stand on his own as an artist.

=== 2007–2014: Solo Work ===
After leaving Roll Deep Trim distanced himself from the group and has since started his own collective known as "The Circle". He has also independently released ten mixtapes, working at a prolific rate. When asked about his mixtape series by The Guardian's David Stelfox, he said:

"I treat them as training, I'm not trying to make the best record in the world. What I'm doing is pushing myself, being different and seeing where that takes me. Mixtapes are all about challenging myself and experimenting. There are lots of sides to me, musically and as a person. This is a way for me to get all of that out there and show people what I can do."

Trim had a prolific 2011 releasing four independent mixtapes as well as collaborating with Skream on a track named "Tweedle Dee Tweedle Dum" which was released on Tempa Recordings, recording "I Am" which was released as a single on Butterz recordings and an EP called Stereotype with Mark Pritchard which was released on Planet Mu. 2012 saw the release of The Nangest EP with longtime collaborator Roachee and the long anticipated "Confidence Boost" single, produced by James Blake - a track first heard as an a cappella preview on Soulfood Vol. 2 in 2007. The final version had existed as a dubplate since 2010 and was finally released as a 12" single in September 2012 on R&S Records.

=== 2012–present: debut album ===
In late 2012 Trim signed a contract with Rinse Recordings to work on his first album, tentatively titled "Crisis". However, during 2013 Trim had an acrimonious split from his label after growing frustrated with a lack of releases and limited creative control. In early 2014 he premiered new music on James Blake's BBC Radio 1 show and confirmed his intentions to release his album independently on an imprint called Secluded Area Of Music. The album will have no choruses and no features, its release will be preceded by two further mixtape releases and a second collaborative EP with Roachee. Trim's first single "Vending Machine" was released in March 2014 and this was followed by the mixtapes "Fresh Trim" and "NFA" in May. In August 2015, Trim previewed the title track from "Crisis" on his SoundCloud. He also featured on Commodo's album "How What Time", on the song "Itchin", released on 8 April 2016.

In June 2016, James Blake's label 1-800 DINOSAUR released a long rumoured Trim EP, a double A side called "RPG/Man Like Me". Later that month it was confirmed that Trim would release a full album on the label on 29 July 2016 entitled "1-800 DINOSAUR Presents Trim".

== Feuds ==
Trim gained early notoriety for his willingness to clash rivals on pirate radio stations and for his track "The Lowdown", a 6-minute tirade aimed at many fellow MCs which was released as a B side on his first single in 2004. Trim's numerous musical disputes have included disagreements with many Grime MCs including Stormin, Fumin,Big H, President T, Flowdan and Wiley.

== Discography ==
Albums

- 2016: 1-800 DINOSAUR Presents Trim

EPs

- 2010: Spectre EP [w/ Becoming Real]
- 2011: Stereotype [w/] (Pritch)
- 2016: Them Or Me [w/ Nico Lindsey & The Last Skeptik]
- 2017: No Chill EP [w/ Rage]
- 2020: Road Works, Pt. 1

Mixtapes

- 2007: Soulfood, Vol. 1: It's Still My Playground
- 2007: Soulfood, Vol. 2: Lyriks
- 2008: Soulfood, Vol. 3: Leaf Out of Their Book
- 2009: Soulfood, Vol. 4: Da Bucket Meal
- 2009: Monkey Features
- 2010: Trim City
- 2011: Monkey Features, Vol. 2
- 2011: Wrap
- 2011: Chelsea Smile
- 2011: Ghostwriter vs Autotune
- 2012: Bandoolou
- 2014: Fresh Trim
- 2014: NFA [No Further Action]
- 2014: Monkey Features, Vol. 3

Singles

- 2004: "Boogeyman/The Lowdown"
- 2005: "Trim N Scratch" [w/Scratchy]
- 2007: "The Bits" [w/Dusk + Blackdown]
- 2011: "I Am"
- 2012: "Confidence Boost"
- 2013: "Sat Nav Walking "
- 2014: "Vending Machine"
- 2016: "RPG/Man Like Me"
- 2019: "Graveyard Shift" (W/Onhell)
- 2023 : "Roadworks Pt1"
- 2023 : "Funky Sailor" [Skream}
- 2024 : "Roadworks Pt2"
- 2024 : "My Problem" (Klinical)
- 2024 : "Wha Happen" (Neffa T + Pinch - Tectonic Recordings)
- 2025 : "Roadworks Pt3"
- 2025 : "Roadworks Pt4"
- 2025 : "Orbit Step" (Leo Gibbon)
- 2025 : "Roadworks Pt5"
- 2025 : "Roadworks Pt6"
- 2025 : "No Caller ID" (Tectonic Recordings + Pinch)

=== With Roll Deep ===
Albums

- 2005: In at the Deep End
- 2007: Rules and Regulations

Mixtapes

- 2004: Creeper, Vol. 1
- 2004: Creeper, Vol. 2

Compilations

- 2009: Street Anthems
