= Tania Foster =

- Born: Tania Foster
- Genres: R&B, hip hop
- Occupations: Singer, musician
- Years active: 2009–present
- Label: Virgin Records
- Website: TaniaFoster.com

Tania Foster is an English singer-songwriter. Foster has achieved one number one single, in the UK, after featuring on Roll Deep's single "Green Light". Tania is currently working with hit writer and producer Fraser T Smith, and also features on a number of songs on Tinchy Stryder's third album, Third Strike. She has also worked with Roll Deep on their fifth album Winner Stays On.

== Early life and personal life ==
Foster grew up with a family of singers and musicians; her father was in a 1980s funk band who often rehearsed at home. She has said that she regularly fell asleep to the sound of live trumpets and saxophones from these rehearsals, and that this is when she decided to focus on her own music career.

She is good friends with fellow Roll Deep featuring artist, Jodie Connor, who contributed to the group's first number-one single.

She studied at the BRIT School.

== Career ==
=== 2009–present: Shining Star and breakthrough ===
Tania Foster started her big time career after featuring on Roll Deep's fourth single, "Green Light", which entered the UK singles charts at number 1, becoming Foster's first number 1 single and first ever single to chart. It also became Roll Deep's second number one single. The track debuted at number 18 on the Irish Singles Chart. The single was released on 15 August 2010, battling Flo Rida and David Guetta's "Club Can't Handle Me" and Eminem and Rihanna's "Love the Way You Lie". "Green Light" got mainly good reception after Digital Spy said the song had a definition of a guilty pleasure, and later giving the song three out of five stars.

Foster has also featured on Tinchy Stryder's third album, Third Strike. She sang guest vocals on a number of songs within the album. She is also working with hit writer and producer Fraser T Smith on her studio album. She confirmed that her first studio album, due to be released in late 2010, would in fact be titled Shining Star.

Foster released her first solo single in late 2010, titled "SupaWoman" the track features an unknown rapper.

Foster featured on a single with Bingo Players, "Nightshift" in 2022.

In 2023 Foster has also featured on a single with Antonio Kolic & NuKey titled "Wanna Go Back", released on House Essential Records.

== Discography ==
=== Singles ===
| Year | Single | Peak chart positions | | | Album |
| Year | Single | UK | UK R&B | IRE | Album |
|---|---|---|---|---|---|
| 2010 | "SupaWoman" | — | — | — | Shining Star |
As featured artist
| 2010 | "Green Light" (Roll Deep featuring Tania Foster) | 1 | 1 | 18 | Winner Stays On |
