= DaWood =

David DaWood
- Born: David Dawood; 14 August 1981 (age 44); England, United Kingdom
- Genres: Pop, house, hip hop
- Occupation(s): DJ, producer, songwriter, audio engineer
- Labels: Warner Chappell; 2017-present

David Dawood (born 31 December 1981), known professionally as DaWood, is an English DJ/producer and songwriter. He is best known for producing and co-writing the song "Good Times" by Roll Deep, which was a number one on the UK Singles Chart for 3 weeks, making it the longest reigning number one of 2010.

== Career ==
Since the early nineties, when Dawood began making beats on his school music computers, his main passion and priority has been creating music, leading to his decision to leave college in order to raise enough funds to buy studio equipment. 2001 brought Dawood his first cut; his track "Flexin" was used on the UK boy band Blue's album ‘One Love’ – the album selling over 2 million copies worldwide. Dawood has worked closely with Tinchy Stryder and on his 2012 album entitled ‘Full Tank‘, as well as having two cuts on the album, ‘Bad Intentions’ by Dappy.

=== 2010-present ===
David Dawood is the musical architect behind 2010’s dance hit "Good Times" by Roll Deep featuring Jodie Connor. The single went to Number 1 in the UK Singles Chart and held this position for 3 weeks making it the longest reigning Number 1 of 2010.

In 2011, Dawood produced two singles for recording artist Jodie Connor; "Now or Never" which was released in January 2011 and charted at Number 14 on the UK Singles Chart and was soon followed by another UK Top 40, "Bring It" featuring Tinchy Stryder.

In 2012, Dawood produced the track "Take You There" by Jodie Connor featuring Busta Rhymes and it was released on 29 July 2012. Dawood has produced the track "Come with Me" by Dappy, which will feature on his debut studio album entitled Bad Intentions, and the track will be released worldwide on 12 August 2012. Other artists DaWood has worked with, written and produced for include Kelly Rowland, Wiley, Roll Deep, Jodie connor, Dappy, Tinchy Stryder, Maxta, Alex Hepburn, Little Nikki, Namie Amuro, Lawson, Cover Drive, Cheryl Cole, Zara Larsson, Vita Chambers, Christina Millian, Blue, Nathan Sykes, 99 Souls, Stylo G, Karen Harding, f(x) (K-POP girl group), M-22, Bakermat, Alex Clare, Fluer East, Klingande

== Discography ==
=== Songwriting and producing discography ===
Year	Artist	Tracks	Album	Label	Credit	Peak Chart Position
2002	Blue	Flexin	One Love	Virgin/Innocent Records	Written	UK Albums: 1
2010	Roll Deep	Good Times	Winner Stays On	Virgin/Relentless Records	Co - Written/Produced/Mixed	UK Singles: 1
2011	Jodie Connor Feat Wiley	Now Or Never	TBA	Polydor	Co-Written/Produced	UK Singles: 14
2011	Jodie Connor	Bring It	TBA	Polydor	Co-Written/Produced	UK Singles: 37
2012	Jodie Connor feat. Busta Rhymes	Take You There	TBA	3Beat/AATW	Co- Written/Produced	—
2012	Tinchy Stryder	Oh No	TBA	Island/Universal	Co Written/Produced/Mixed	—
2012	Vita Chambers	Fix You	—	Universal Republic	Co-Written/Produced/Mixed	Canadian Top 100: 40
2012	DaWood & Retro vs Dappy & Margs	Come with Me	Bad Intentions	AATW/Island	Co-Written/Produced/Mixed	—
2012	Dappy	Ying Yang	—	ATTW/Universal	Co-Produced	—
2013	Zara Larsson	Cash Me Out	Allow Me To Reintroduce Myself	Ten	Co-Written/Produced/Mixed	Swedish Album Chart: 7
2013	Namie Amuro	La La La	Feel	Dimension Point/Sony	Co-Written/Produced	Japanese Album Chart: 1
2013	Little Nikki	Nikki Says	—	Sony	Co-Written/Produced/Mixed	—
2013	Little Nikki	Yo Yo	—	Sony	Co-Written/Produced/Mixed	—
2014	Cheryl Cole	Yellow love	Only Human	Polydor	Co-Written/Produced	UK Album Chart: 7
2014	Sonic Matta Featuring Ayak	To Be Loved	—	Uptempo Records	Co-Written/Produced/Mixed	—
2015	Jodie Connor	Back To You	—	Mankind Music	Co-Written/Produced/Mixed	—
2015	f(x)	Cash Me Out	4 Walls	SM Entertainment	Co-Written/Produced/Mixed	—
2016	Alex Hepburn	Blackout	—	Warner France	Co-Written/Co-Produced	Release Date TBC
2016	Emmi	Sleep on It	—	Universal	Co-Written/Produced/Mixed	—
2016	Emmi	YSYLM	—	—	Co-Written/Produced	—
2016	M-22	Inspiration	—	Refune	Co-Written	—
2016	M-22 & Sonic Matta Feat Hayley May	Good For Me	—	Refune	Co-Written/Co-Produced	Release Date TBC
2016	Jodie Connor	Good Lovin - (Pretty Little Thing Tv Advert)	—	Mankind Music	Co-Written/Produced/Mixed	Release Date TBC
2016	Lawson	When I'm Old	Perspective	Polydor	Co-Written	UK Album Chart: 23
2016	Bakermat Feat Alex Clare	Living	—	Sony	Co-Written	Release Date May 2016
2016	Nathan Sykes	With You	—	Global/Polydor	Co-Written/Co-Produced	Release Date TBC
2017	Gestört aber GeiL	Wave Back Home	—	Kontor	Co-Written	German Top 40: 4
2017	TRAVI	Bang	—	Starwatch Entertainment	Produced/Co-Written/Mixed	—
2017	Solo Suspex	They Don't Know	—	AATW/Universal	Co-Written	—
2018	Alexandra Burke	Maybe Its Love	—	Decca	Co-Written	March 2018
2018	Travi	In The Morning	—	Starwatch Entertainment	Produced/Co-Written/Mixed	Release Date TBC
2018	Lo-Steppa	No love	—	Armada	Co-Written	Release Date TBC
2018	Solo Suspex Feat Jodie connor	Back To You	—	AATW/Universal	Co-Produced/Co-Written	Release Date 20 June
2018	Marcapasos Feat Phrazer	Rest Of My Life	—	Kontour	Produced/Co-Written/Mixed	Release Date 6 July
2018	Jaden Bojsen	The Weekend	—	Warner Music	Produced/Co-Written/Mixed	Release Date TBC

=== Remixography ===
Year	Artist	Song title
2011	Jodie Connor	"Now or Never" (DaWood Remix)
2014	Clean Bandit	"Extraordinary" (Sonic Matta Remix)
2014	Lana Del Ray	"Ultraviolence" (Sonic Matta Remix)
2014	Cheryl Cole	"I Don't Care" (Sonic Matta Remix)
2014	Ill Blu	"Bu Magic" (Sonic Matta Remix)
2014	Joel Compass	"Forgive me" (Sonic Matta Remix)
2015	Christian B & Lavvy Levan	"Stand Up" (Sonic Matta Remix)
2015	Emmi	"My Kind of Swag" (Sonic Matta Remix)
2015	Petite Meller	"Baby Love" (Sonic Matta Remix)
2015	M-22	"Good To be Loved" (Sonic Matta Remix)
