= Take You There =

Take You There may refer to:

- "Take You There" (Donnie Klang song), 2008
- "Take You There" (Mànran & Michelle McManus song)
- "Take You There" (Pete Rock & CL Smooth song), 1994
- "Take You There" (Sean Kingston song), 2007
- "Take You There" (Jodie Connor song), 2012

== See also ==
- "I'll Take You There", a 1972 song by The Staple Singers
- "Take Ü There", a 2014 song by Jack Ü featuring Kiesza
