= Pay as U Go =

UK musical group

Pay As U Go
- Origin: London, England
- Genre: UK garage
- Years active: 1999/2000–2003
- Labels: Sony Music; Pay As U Go Recordings
- Past members: Wiley; DJ Slimzee; Flowdan; Breeze; DJ Target; Maxwell D; God's Gift; Geeneus; Major Ace (deceased); Plague; Riko Dan; Bubbles; Dogzilla; Dom P; Lady J

Pay As U Go or Pay As U Go Cartel was a UK garage collective formed in late 1999 and 2000. In 2002, the collective achieved a No. 13 UK hit with "Champagne Dance". After Pay As U Go disbanded, Wiley went on to form the grime crew Roll Deep with fellow Pay As U Go members. Roll Deep would eventually include prominent artists such as Dizzee Rascal, Tinchy Stryder and Skepta.

The crew has been credited for paving the way for grime music, alongside So Solid Crew and Heartless Crew.

== History ==
In 1998, Maxwell D and his friends Carl, DJ Target, and Wiley began performing on London pirate radio station Rinse FM. Together they formed a group called 'The Ladies Hit Squad'. Major Ace, Plague, God's Gift, and DJ Slimzee also hosted their own show on Rinse FM every Sunday. In the summer of 2000, the Pay As You Go phone network was experiencing network errors coincidentally every Sunday coinciding with their show, allowing everyone to call into the radio show for free. After three weeks of this, Plague dubbed the show the "pay as you go show". The pay as you go radio show and Ladies Hit Squad's show on Rinse FM were the most popular shows on Rinse FM at the time, leading to the owner of Rinse FM suggesting that Ladies Hit Squad and the pay as you go show merge, leading to the official Pay As U Go crew being formed. Flowdan, Riko Dan, Dom P, Breeze and Bubbles later joined the group. The group released a dubplate, "Know We", in late 1999. The song was officially released in 2000 as their debut single.

In 2001, Wiley, Flowdan, Bubbles and Breeze recorded a song entitled "Terrible", which record stores perceived to be a follow-up to "Know We". Wiley decided he did not want to release it under the Pay As U Go name, so Flowdan suggested the name Roll Deep; a homage to the phrase "rolling deep", popular within bashment songs. Following the creation of Roll Deep, Dogzilla and Lady J joined Pay As U Go in 2003. Flowdan cited the introduction of Dizzee Rascal to Roll Deep and his subsequent popularity as the reason why Pay As U Go eventually disbanded and Roll Deep rose to prominence.

== Discography ==
=== Singles ===
- "Know We" (2000), Solid City
- "Be Real" (2000), Relentless
- "Champagne Dance" (2001), Sony Music/INCredible - UK #13
