= Champagne Dance =

2002 single by UK garage

Single by Pay As U Go

from the album Pay As U Go
- Released: 2002
- Recorded: 2001
- Genre: UK garage
- Length: 3:29
- Label: Sony Music; INCredible
- Songwriters: Dominic Baker; Jason Paul Brown; Richard Cowie Jr.; Denzol Cameron; Gordon Warren; Darren Joseph; Luke Monero
- Producers: Geeneus; DJ Target

Pay As U Go singles chronology
"Be Real" (2000)	"Champagne Dance" (2002)

"Champagne Dance" is a song by UK garage crew Pay As U Go. In April 2002, the single charted at number 13 on the UK Singles Chart. It remains the group's only charting hit single before they disbanded with members going on to join grime crew Roll Deep.

== Track listings ==
12"
A. "Champagne Dance" (Brown Acid mix)
B1. "Champagne Dance" (Da Sticky Lick)
B2. "Champagne Dance" (Destruction remix)

CD single

1. "Champagne Dance" (Brown Acid radio edit)
2. "Champagne Dance" (Da Sticky Lick)
3. "Champagne Dance" (Destruction remix)
4. Champagne Dance video

== Charts ==
Chart (2002)	Peak position
UK Singles (Official Charts)	13
