= Picture Perfect (Roll Deep song) =

Single by Roll Deep

from the album X
- Released: 22 January 2012
- Genre: Dance-pop, hip hop
- Length: 3:36
- Label: Cooking Vinyl
- Songwriter(s): Agent X, D, A, Eames C Lyndsay, M Jordine, J Black, T Foster, R Williams, A Ali, I Atherly
- Producer(s): Agent X David Anthony

Roll Deep singles chronology
"Take Control" (2010)	"Picture Perfect" (2012)	"All or Nothing" (2013)

"Picture Perfect" is a single by London-based collective Roll Deep The song was released in the United Kingdom on 22 January 2012 as the lead single from their upcoming fifth studio album X. The song peaked at number 19 on the UK Indie Chart.

== Music video ==
A music video to accompany the release of "Picture Perfect" was first released onto YouTube on 28 November 2011 at a total length of three minutes and thirty-nine seconds.

== Track listing ==
Digital download

1. "Picture Perfect" - 3:36
2. "Picture Perfect" (Mensah Remix) - 4:41
3. "Picture Perfect" (Exemen Remix) - 4:41
4. "Picture Perfect" (Spoon and Horx Remix) - 4:21
5. "Picture Perfect" (Dave Silcox and Matt Nash) - 5:08
6. "Picture Perfect" (Cutline Remix) - 4:51

== Chart performance ==
Chart (2012)	Peak Position
UK Indie (OCC)	19
UK Singles (The Official Charts Company)	169

== Release history ==
Region	Date	Format	Label
United Kingdom	22 January 2012	Digital Download	Cooking Vinyl
