= Notting Hill (disambiguation) =

Notting Hill is a district in London.

Notting Hill may also refer to:

- Notting Hill, Victoria, Australia
- Notting Hill Gate, a street in London
  - Notting Hill Gate tube station, a railway station of the London Underground
- Notting Hill (film), a 1999 romantic comedy film
  - Notting Hill (soundtrack)
- Notting Gate, also known as Notting Hill, a neighborhood in Ontario, Canada
- Notting Hill Academy of Music, London
- Notting Hill Carnival, an annual festival in Notting Hill, London
- Notting Hill Press, a defunct British book publisher
