= Jigitz =

American musician and DJ

- Born: John Jigitz; Albuquerque, New Mexico, US
- Years active: 2017-present
- Labels: R&R
- Publisher: Artist Partner Group
- Website: jigitz.online

John Jigitz, known professionally as Jigitz, is an American musician and DJ.

Jigitz gained prominence throughout 2025, due in large part to his high-energy in-the-round live performances and the single Tell You Straight, which gained viral acclaim and earned him Billboard's Dance Rookie of the Month. His breakthrough 2026 sophomore album, 50 Ballerinas, featured collaborations with Charlotte Plank, Glaive, Venbee, and Kučka.
