= Winner Stays On =

Studio album by Roll Deep
- Released: 8 November 2010
- Recorded: 2009 – 2010
- Genre: Pop rap, hip house, grime, dubstep, breakbeat
- Label: Relentless Records/Virgin Records

Roll Deep chronology
| Street Anthems (2009) | Winner Stays On (2010) | X (2012) |

Singles from Winner Stays On
- 1. "Good Times" Released: 26 April 2010; 2. "Green Light" Released: 15 August 2010; 3. "Take Control" Released: 1 November 2010

Winner Stays On is the fourth studio album by London-based grime music collective Roll Deep; it was released on 8 November 2010. Three singles have been released from the album, including "Good Times" and "Green Light", which both went to number 1 in the UK, plus the top 30 hit "Take Control", which features Alesha Dixon.

At the time of recording, the collective consisted of DJ Target, Flowdan, Breeze, Danny Weed, DJ Karnage, J2K, Manga, Brazen and Scratchy.

== Singles ==
- "Good Times" was the first single released from the album; it was released on 26 April 2010. It reached #1 on the UK Singles Chart making it their first number one single in the UK. It also charted at #13 on the Irish Singles Chart. It also became a top ten hit in Slovakia and on the European Hot 100 Singles Chart.
- "Green Light" was the second single released from the album; it was released on 15 August 2010. It reached #1 on the UK Singles Chart their second number one single in the UK. It also charted at #18 on the Irish Singles Chart and became a top 40 hit in the Netherlands.
- "Take Control" was the third and final single to be released from the album; it was released on 1 November 2010. It reached a peak of #29 on the UK Singles Chart before falling out of the top 40 the week after. It peaked at #27 in Scotland.

== Critical reception ==
Professional ratings
Review scores
| Source | Rating |
|---|---|
| The Mirror | 2/5 stars |
| NME | 1/10 stars |

The album has received negative to mixed reviews; however, the BBC were positive stating that "as an underground group with commercial ambitions, you face a difficult hurdle: how to take an original, boundary-shifting but sometimes unpalatable sound and break it into a mass audience without spoiling the integrity of what you do in the process? It's a hurdle that Roll Deep faced back in 2005 with the release of their debut album, In at the Deep End. A grime crew forged in the east London neighbourhood of Bow, Roll Deep have seen now-popular names like Dizzee Rascal, Wiley, Tinchy Stryder and 1xtra DJ Target rise through its ranks. For ...Deep End, though, it turned out that snappy grime numbers like "When I'm 'Ere" lacked the commercial appeal of crossover tunes such as "The Avenue" and "Shake a Leg".

"Roll Deep, then, have evolved into a curious – albeit not terribly uncommon – thing: a grime crew that doesn't play grime. Their fourth album, Winner Stays On, is, flagrantly, a pop album, and the good news is that they're getting better at it. "Good Times", which hit number one in the charts back in May, is excellent: a deliberately glitzy celebration of kicking up one's heels, tales of high-street consumerism and clubbing propelled upwards on ecstatic synth bumps and a yearning chorus courtesy of Jodie Connor. Both "Take Control" (complete with a vocal from Alesha Dixon) and "Green Light", a Calvin Harris-style pop bounce that wraps cheeky mating-game raps around a Green Cross Code-friendly metaphor, stick to a similar formula – and while this is obvious stuff, it's certainly well-done.

"Elsewhere, there are a couple of moments that hark back to Roll Deep's grime genesis. "Out the Blue" finds Scratchy, Breeze, Brazen and Wiley dropping rhymes over booming sub-bass. And while "Team" is not exactly lyrically spectacular – it features Wiley's habitual fall-back of ending every line with the same word – it smashes it through busy, zig-zagging synth and sheer force of numbers. More quality grime would be nice, but Winner Stays On proves Roll Deep are no longer an underground crew trying to make pop: the charts are there for the taking."

== Track listing ==
| No. | Title | Writer(s) | Producer(s) | Length |
|---|---|---|---|---|
| 1. | "Intro" (featuring Carla Marie) | Ardom Ali, Jason Black, Matthew Reid, Marc Veira, Ryan Williams, Daniel "Hygrade" Traynor, Carla Marie Williams | HyGrade | 3:03 |
| 2. | "Good Times" (featuring Jodie Connor) | Wiley, Ibrahim Atherly, Ali, Williams, B Preston, David Dawood, Jodie Connor, Charlotte Kelly | David Dawood & Preston | 3:44 |
| 3. | "What Do They Know" (featuring Eva Simons) | Wiley, Ali, Black, Reid, Veira, R Williams, M Hamilton, E Craig, J Sullivan | Wideboys | 4:02 |
| 4. | "The One" | I Atherly, A Ali, D Baker, J Black, M Reid, Veira, R Williams, J Dunnee, J Hirst | Daniel J. Baker | 4:31 |
| 5. | "Green Light" (featuring Tania Foster) | I Atherly, A Ali, D Baker, J Black, Wiley, R Williams, J Dunne, J Hirst, V Akintola, K Alexander, S Charles | Daniel J. Baker | 3:57 |
| 6. | "Out The Blue" | I Atherly, A Ali, D Baker, T Bell, J Black, Wiley, Darren Joseph, M Reid, R Williams | Target | 3:17 |
| 7. | "Take Control" (featuring Alesha Dixon) | I Atherly, A Ali, D Baker J Black, Wiley, J Dunne, J Hirst, M Reid, R William, V Akintola K Alexander S Charles | Daniel | 4:27 |
| 8. | "Fall Again" (featuring Parallel) | A Ali, D Baker, J Black, M Reid, J Dunne, J Hirst, V Akintola, K Alexander, S Charles | Daniel J. Baker | 3:58 |
| 9. | "Team" | I Atherly, A Ali, J Black, M Reid, Veira, R Williams, | Scratchy | 2:21 |
| 10. | "Morning After" | A Ali, J Black, M Reid, M Veira, G Dankwah, C Haaley, G Hayley, R Hayley, C Patt | The Fives | 3:40 |
| 11. | "Over The Rainbow" (featuring Cherri V) | I Atherly, A Ali, Joseph, R Williams, C Leachman, | Target | 3:30 |

== Charts ==
| Chart (2010) | Peak position |
|---|---|
| UK Albums Chart | 55 |
| UK Download Chart | 27 |
| UK R&B Chart | 9 |

== Release history ==
| Region | Date | Format | Label | Catalogue |
|---|---|---|---|---|
| United Kingdom | 8 November 2010 | CD, digital download | Relentless Records | CDREL23 |
| Ireland | 8 November 2010 | CD, digital download | Relentless Records | CDREL23 |
