= The Avenue (song) =

Single by Roll Deep

from the album In at the Deep End
- Released: 18 July 2005
- Genre: Grime, neo soul
- Label: Relentless Records
- Songwriters: Wiley, Mark Tibenham, Lol Mason
- Producer: Wiley

Roll Deep singles chronology
"The Avenue" (2005)	"Shake a Leg" (2005)

"The Avenue" is a song by grime collective Roll Deep. The song samples from "Heartache Avenue", a 1983 song by the Maisonettes. The song is the group's first without Dizzee Rascal and it entered the UK Singles Chart at number eleven.

== Track listing ==
Digital download

1. "The Avenue" (radio edit) – 2:32

CD single

1. "The Avenue" (radio edit) – 2:32
2. "When I'm 'Ere"

== Chart performance ==
Chart (2005)	Peak position
UK Singles (OCC)	11

Chart (2006)	Peak position
UK Singles (OCC)	249
