= Skepsis (musician) =

English electronic musician

- Born: Scott Elliott Jenkins
- Origin: Beckenham, London, England
- Occupation: Musician

Scott Elliott Jenkins, professionally known as Skepsis, is an English musician from Beckenham. He is best known for his 2023 single, "Rave Out", with Turno and Charlotte Plank, which charted at No. 37 on the UK Singles Chart; his 2024 follow-up with Plank, "Green & Gold" with Rudimental and Riko Dan, charted at No. 29. He has also released the collaborative album Pure Bassline 2 with DJ Q and Jamie Duggan, which charted at No. 2 on the UK Dance Albums Chart, and the 2021 studio album Faith in Chaos, which charted at No. 79 on the UK Album Downloads Chart.

== Life and career ==
=== Early life ===
Scott Elliott Jenkins is from Beckenham, and attended Langley Park School for Boys and a university in Canterbury. He became interested in electronic music after hearing the works of the Prodigy and Pendulum. When he was fourteen or fifteen, his school won a grant from the government of the United Kingdom to renovate its music department, which it used to order itself iMacs with Logic Pro on them, which prompted Jenkins to develop an interest; he initially made dubstep, drum and bass, rap and trap beats.

He also began DJing aged fifteen, after a tutor came into his school and offered lessons during lunchtimes; he learnt on Serato, as that was what was being advertised in Langley Park at the time, though later switched to using a set of Pioneer CDJ-350s after saving up for a year. His first set was at a parent–teacher conference.

=== Bassline works, Pure Bassline 2, and Faith in Chaos ===
In 2013, aged 17, Jenkins was introduced by a friend to "The Grid" by Bristol-based duo My Nu Leng; enamoured by what he was hearing, he switched to making bassline, with his first such works being bootleg recordings of grime artists such as Wiley and Skepta. In April 2016, he and Bushbaby set up Lengoland, a Facebook group for music, parties, and track identification; he then signed with CruCast, a record label set up in summer 2016 as a YouTube channel.

In January 2017, he released his first single, "Goes Like", and the following year, his collaborative album with DJ Q and Jamie Duggan, Pure Bassline 2, charted at No. 2 on the UK Dance Albums Chart. In January 2020, "Behind the Bass: Skepsis", a short film produced by Ranvia Johal examining Skepsis, screened as part of a series by Master's journalism graduates at Nottingham Trent University, and the following month, Dave Jenkins of DJ Mag wrote that "during 2016-17", Jenkins, Bru-C, and CruCast act Darkzy had become "household names for anyone following the heavier end of UK bass music".

During the pandemic, Jenkins produced the fifteen-track album Faith in Chaos; he told Manchester's Finest in November 2021 that he had produced it with the intention of producing something that lasted a bit longer, on the grounds that artists were putting tracks out constantly and finding them quickly forgotten. CruCast released the album in October 2021, which Jenkins promoted with a show at Ministry of Sound, and which charted at No. 79 on the UK Album Downloads Chart; shortly afterwards, he moved to Liverpool.

=== Drum and bass works, "Rave Out", and "Green & Gold" ===
In April 2022, Jenkins' remix of DJ Fresh's drum and bass track "Gold Dust" appeared on a package of remixes intended to celebrate the song's 10th anniversary, even though the song was first released in 2008 and re-released in 2010. Jenkins then diversified into making his own drum and bass, having previously used the genre to close his sets, and in December 2022, he released his 'debut' drum and bass track, "Know What It Means" featuring Raphaella, which was released alongside a music video directed by Eleanor Hann and Ranvia Johal.

The following month, Jenkins attended a writer's camp with Ultra Records, which had been organised by Turno, a jump-up musician who had spearheaded several initiatives relating to men's mental health following the suicide of his brother, including the charity single "What's On Your Mind". "Rave Out", a collaboration with Turno and Charlotte Plank, was the first track completed at the camp, and discussed men's mental health; the track came out in June 2023, and entered the UK Top 40 in September 2023 at No. 37, spending one week there. "Rave Out" later appeared on Plank's mixtape InHer World. Jenkins and Plank later collaborated again in February 2024 for "Green & Gold", a collaboration with Rudimental and Riko Dan of Roll Deep, which charted at No. 29.

== Artistry ==
In a January 2017 interview with UKF Music, he stated that his early bassline works were inspired by hearing Mr. V's "Hypnotic" featuring D Double E on BBC Radio 1Xtra. He subsequently used a July 2017 interview with The Partae to cite Pendulum, the Prodigy, My Nu Leng, Netsky, and Chris Lorenzo as influences and an October 2019 interview with Boohoo.com to cite Skrillex, Flava D, and My Nu Leng.

In a March 2023 interview with Music Radar, Jenkins noted that he had not deviated from Logic since being introduced to it, and that his works used "a lot" of saturation, citing the plugins FabFilter Saturn, iZotope Trash, Newfangled Audio Saturate, Sausage Fattener, and Endless Smile as among those he used; he also stated that he used NI Massive in his works, on the basis that "everyone" in the bassline scene used the synthesiser in theirs. He also stated in July 2017 that many of his tracks were produced drums first, usually starting with the drop.
