= Now or Never (Jodie Connor song) =

Single by Jodie Connor featuring Wiley
- Released: 13 January 2011
- Recorded: 2010
- Genre: Grime, pop
- Length: 3:42
- Label: Polydor, Takeover Entertainment
- Songwriters: David Dawood (songwriter); Jodie Connor (co-lyricist); Parallel (co-lyricist)
- Producer: David Dawood

Jodie Connor singles chronology
"Good Times" (2010)	"Now or Never" (2011)	"Bring It" (2011)

Wiley singles chronology
"Never Be Your Woman" (2010)	"Now or Never" (2011)	"Pow 2011" (2011)

Music video
- "Now or Never" on YouTube

"Now or Never" is the debut single by British singer and songwriter Jodie Connor, which features vocals from British grime artist Wiley. It was released via digital download on 13 January 2011 on Polydor Records. The track was produced by Takeover Entertainment producer David Dawood, who also produced Roll Deep's number one single "Good Times" on which Connor is featured.

== Critical reception ==
Robert Copsey of Digital Spy gave the song a positive review stating:

They say breaking into the music industry takes a combination of talent, persistence and a cheeky wink from good old Lady Luck. This tried and tested formula could certainly be applied to Jodie Connor, who was given a shot at the bigtime back in the heady days of April 2010 when she trilled the hook on Roll Deep's chart-topping smash 'Good Times'.

By way of a thank you, we're assuming, she's teamed up with the rap pack's head honcho Wiley for her first dip into solodom, offering up a neat little grime-pop ditty about playground love which marries a twinkly piano riff to gritty blips and bleeps in perfectly listenable fashion. The lyrics are hardly Ivor Novello-worthy stuff - even rhyming "now or never" with "together" and "stormy weather" - but what would you expect from the woman who crooned one of the most cliche-laden choruses of last year?"I'm gonna leave the day behind...".

== Chart performance ==
"Now or Never" debuted on the UK Singles Chart at number 14 on 23 January 2011 as the week's fifth highest entry. The single also managed to debut at number 6 on the R&B chart. On its second week in the chart, the single fell 16 places to number 30; being hailed the week's 'biggest faller'. It then fell 18 places to number 48 and in its fourth week dropped to #100.

== Track listings and formats ==
Digital download #1
No.	Title	Length
1.	"Now or Never"	3:42
2.	"Now or Never" (Dawood remix)	5:04
Total length:		8:46

Digital download #2
No.	Title	Length
1.	"Now or Never" (Cutmore club mix)	6:33
2.	"Now or Never" (Cutmore radio mix [featuring Wiley])	3:59
3.	"Now or Never" (Ruff Loaderz club mix [featuring Wiley])	6:09
4.	"Now or Never" (Ruff Loaderz radio mix)	3:53
Total length:		20:34

== Charts ==
Chart (2011)	Peak position
Scotland Singles (OCC)	11
UK Singles (OCC)	14
UK Singles Downloads (OCC)	14
UK Hip Hop/R&B (OCC)	6
