= Charlotte Plank =

Australian-British singer

- Born: Australia
- Origin: England
- Genres: Jungle; drum and bass; indie pop
- Occupation: Musician
- Years active: 2020–present
- Label: RCA
- Member of: Loud LDN
- Website: www.charlotteplank.com

Charlotte Plank is an Australian-British singer. She has released three solo singles and featured on the hit single "Dancing Is Healing" by Rudimental and Vibe Chemistry, which reached No. 5 on the UK Singles Chart. She is also a member of the collective Loud LDN.

== Life and career ==
=== Early life ===
Plank was born in Australia and attended the Notting Hill Academy of Music in London. Her parents met in Australia in the early 1990s rave scene, and her uncle was a DJ. She began recording music during the COVID-19 lockdown in the UK; her first works were lo-fi demos. She previously worked at Marks and Spencer.

=== Early works ===
On 14 February 2021, Plank released "Dont U Know" with Frankie Allan and Strictly Banks, and on 13 August 2021, she featured on "Reflecting" from Chowerman's EP ANTITHESIS, which also featured Luciferian and Kami-O. On 20 May 2022, Plank self-released "Hate Me". The song details Plank's attempts to put off a potential love interest due to her own self-hatred.

The song brought Plank to the attention of Black Butter Records, who signed her, and re-released it on 19 August 2022, the same day as its camcorder-style music video, which was shot at Sexy Lady Massive, a women-only rave in London.

On 9 November 2022, she released "Lost Boys", which discusses men's mental health. On 19 January 2023, she released "L.S.D. (Love So Damaged)", which discusses the struggles of a toxic relationship.

=== Chart success ===
On 21 April 2023, Plank, Rudimental and Vibe Chemistry released "Dancing Is Healing", a song about the healing properties of dancing, which reached No. 5 on the UK Singles Chart and was certified Silver by the British Phonographic Industry (BPI).

On 25 April 2023, she released "White Noise", which she had previously performed live.

On 18 May 2023, she, Turno, and Skepsis released "Rave Out". The track was recorded as the first of 22 songs created during a January 2023 writing camp, discusses men's mental health, and reached No. 37 on the UK Singles Chart.

"Dancing Is Healing" and "Rave Out" later appeared on Plank's mixtape InHer World.

Plank and Skepsis collaborated again in February 2024 on "Green & Gold", a collaboration with Rudimental and Riko Dan of Roll Deep, which reached No. 29 on the UK Singles Chart.

== Artistry ==
Plank's musical inspirations include Fleetwood Mac, Sam Fender, Keith Flint, Orbital, and Bicep. She, along with Piri, Venbee, Issey Cross, and Willow Kayne, is a member of Loud LDN, a collective of female and non-binary musicians based in London and its suburbs.

== Discography ==
=== Extended plays ===
Title	Details
InHer World	Released: 27 October 2023; Label: Black Butter Records; Format: Digital download, streaming
Stargirl + Ellen	Released: 13 December 2024; Label: RCA Records; Format: Digital download, streaming
ClubLiminal	Released: 2 May 2025; Label: RCA Records; Format: Digital download, streaming

=== Singles ===
==== As lead artist ====
List of singles as a lead artist, with selected chart positions, certifications, and album name
Title	Year	Peak chart positions			Certifications	Album
Title	Year	UK	UK Dance	NZ Hot	Certifications	Album
"Hate Me"	2022	—	—	—		InHer World
"Lost Boys"	2022	—	—	—		InHer World
"L.S.D. (Love So Damaged)"	2023	—	—	—		InHer World
"Dancing Is Healing" (with Rudimental & Vibe Chemistry)	2023	5	3	—	BPI: Platinum; RMNZ: Gold	InHer World
"White Noise"	2023	—	—	—		InHer World
"Rave Out" (with Turno & Skepsis)	2023	37	20	—	BPI: Gold; RMNZ: 2× Platinum	InHer World
"Dancefloor" (with NOISY)	2023	—	—	—		Non-album single
"Lights" (with Hybrid Minds)	2023	—	—	—	RMNZ: Gold	InHer World
"Redline"	2023	—	—	—		InHer World
"Rage"	2024	—	—	—		ClubLiminal
"Nightshift"	2024	—	—	28	RMNZ: Gold	ClubLiminal
"Temporary Friends" (with Notion)	2024	—	—	—		Forwards
"Stargirl"	2024	—	—	—		ClubLiminal
"Ellen"	2024	—	—	—		ClubLiminal
"Chemical Fashion"	2025	—	—	—		ClubLiminal
"Candy Stores"	2025	—	—	—		ClubLiminal
"Peaches" (with Young Franco)	2025	—	—	28		Non-album singles
"Burberry" (with Notion)	2026	—	—	21		Non-album singles
"—" denotes a recording that did not chart in that territory.

==== As featured artist ====
List of singles as a featured artist, with album name
Title	Year	Peak chart positions		Certifications	Album
Title	Year	UK	UK Dance	Certifications	Album
"Dont U Know" (Strictly Banks & Frankie Allan featuring Charlotte Plank)	2021	—	—		Non-album singles
"Let U Know" (Danny Byrd featuring Charlotte Plank)	2023	—	—		Non-album singles
"Green & Gold" (Rudimental and Skepsis featuring Charlotte Plank & Riko Dan)	2024	29	7	BPI: Gold	TBA
"—" denotes a recording that did not chart in that territory.

== Awards and nominations ==
List of awards and nominations, with award, year, category, nominated work, result, and reference shown
Award	Year	Category	Nominee(s)	Result	Ref.
Brit Awards	2024	Song of the Year	"Dancing Is Healing" (with Rudimental and Vibe Chemistry)	Nominated	
