= Shake a Leg =

Single by Roll Deep

from the album In at the Deep End
- Released: 10 October 2005
- Label: Relentless Records
- Songwriters: Wiley, D Baker, M Ail, R Williams, Pit Baumgarter Pat Appleton, Enrique Madriguera, Eddie Woods
- Producer: Danny Weed

Roll Deep singles chronology
"The Avenue" (2005)	"Shake a Leg" (2005)	"Good Times" (2010)

"Shake a Leg" is a song by Roll Deep. It was released on 10 October 2005 in the UK and managed to peak to number 24 in the UK Singles Chart. The song's instrumental samples "The Mambo Craze" by De-Phazz.

== Track listing ==
Digital download

1. "Shake a Leg" (Radio Edit) – 2:47
2. "Heat Up" – 4:01

== Chart performance ==
Chart (2005)	Peak position
UK Singles (OCC)	24
