= Notting Hill Academy of Music =

Vocational music business school in Notting Hill, London

Coordinates: 51°30′33.12″N 0°11′39.67″W

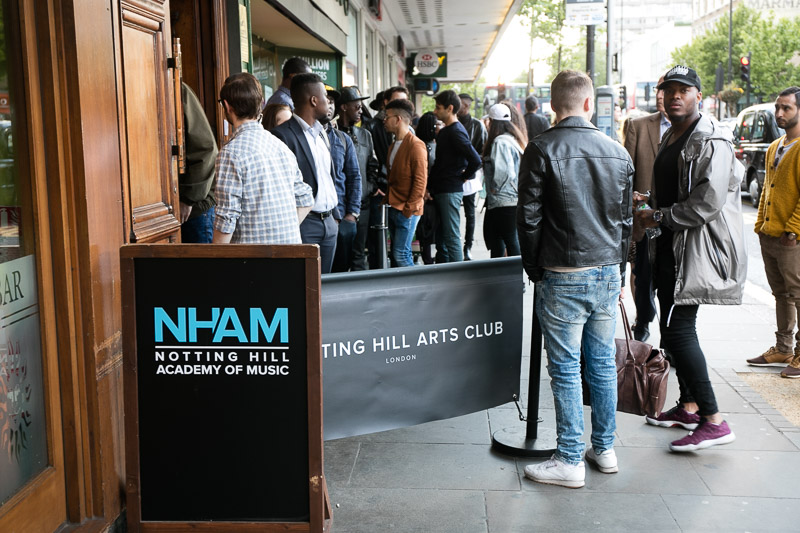
- Industry: Music School
- Founder: Shabs Jobanputra & Ewan Grant
- Headquarters: London, United Kingdom
- Website: http://nottinghillacademyofmusic.com/

The Notting Hill Academy of Music is a vocational music business school located in Notting Hill, London, United Kingdom. Notting Hill Academy of Music offers courses for individuals interested in pursuing a career in the music industry.

The academy was founded by Relentless Records, Shabs Jobanputra.. Since the launch of the Notting Hill Academy of Music, figures in the music industry have come to the Notting Hill Academy of Music to provide seminars and professional insight into the current music industry.

Students are presented with knowledge from lecturers including artist and songwriter Joel Baker, who has worked with Jake Gosling and Plested and toured with Little Simz and Mahalia; music producer Tristan Carmichael, who has worked with Tom Walker, R3HAB and Sam Feldt; and music marketer Krish Kudhail, who has worked with Rema, Ayra Starr and Digga D.

Partners & Supporters include: The Ultimate Seminar, CMU, Beggars Group, Ferocious Talent, Relentless Records, Columbia, BMG, First Access Entertainment, ATC Management, Harry Shotta, First & Last, Sentric Music, Disturbing London, Atlantic, The Sound Collective, Influence Digital and many more.

Past guests have included: David Bloomfield, Kid Massive, Drew Lam, Josh Edwards, Trevor Nelson, Simon Barnabas, Andy Ellis, Jamie Croz, Chris Cooke, Tony Moss, Ben Coates, Jack Guppy, Dumi Oburota, Kevin Brown, Shaun Falkner, Nick Halkes, Twin B, Kelli Ali, Neil Simpson, Adele White, Philip Youngman, Kwame Kwaten, Ryan Walter, Harry Shotta, Sam Potts, Alan Boyd and many more.

== Courses ==
The academy develops short-term music courses (validated and non-validated) to prepare students for work within the evolving music industry.

The academy has courses on A&R and Artist Management, Songwriting, A&R and Songwriting and Music Business Entrepreneur.

Creative Music Business:

The MBE course is designed to engage those who wish to start their own business and become effective in communicating ideas and plans in a meaningful way. There will be in depth focus on setting up events and creating business plans and marketing plans. No stone is left unturned in regards to the ins and outs of the business side of the music industry.

Commercial Songwriting:

The role of Artists and Repertoire (A&R) has evolved significantly alongside changes in music distribution. An A&R professional typically coordinates various industry functions including artist management, legal, and marketing to support the commercial development of signed artists.

Beatmaking and Production:

These roles are very different but are also linked very strongly. A songwriter may wish to understand A&R and A&R as well as what is expected of them and vice versa. This module is designed to give the best of both worlds from the two very different perspectives that rely on each other.

Digital Marketing, Content and Promotion:

The NHAM songwriting course is geared towards the writer behind the artist or the artist themselves and will explore a multitude of themes. Writing for other people is also key for those who wish to have longevity in this career path. An ability to filter content accordingly is also an important skill to have and integral elements such as this will be analysed.
