= Take Control (Roll Deep song) =

Single by Roll Deep featuring Alesha Dixon

from the album Winner Stays On and The Entertainer
- Released: 31 October 2010
- Genre: Electro-grime; hip hop; R&B
- Length: 4:30
- Label: Relentless; Virgin
- Songwriters: Ibrahim Atherly; Adam Ali; Daniel Baker; Jason Black; Johnny Dunne; Joe Hirst; Matthew Reid; Ryan Williams; Victoria Akintola; Kassa Alexander; Sirach Charles; Richard Cowie
- Producer: Daniel

Roll Deep singles chronology
"Green Light" (2010)	"Take Control" (2010)	"Picture Perfect" (2012)

Alesha Dixon singles chronology
"Drummer Boy" (2010)	"Take Control" (2010)	"Radio" (2010)

"Take Control" is the third single from London-based collective Roll Deep's album Winner Stays On, and preludes the album release by a week. The song, which features vocals from singer Alesha Dixon, was released in the UK on 31 October 2010.

== Critical reception ==
"Take Control"
A sample of "Take Control"

Fraser McAlpine of BBC Chart Blog gave the song a positive review stating:

Look at this picture. eleven men, one Roll Deep. Do you know what that says to me? It says here are eleven fellas who probably spend quite a lot of time queuing in order to do their job, or waiting to have another go, once theirs has finished. They might cover it up with an arm in the air or two, a walk from one side of the stage to the other, a moody stare into the crowd, some bouncy high-fives, and a certain amount of joining in at the end of each line, but when you get right down to it, it's all just queueing.

And to make matters worse, sometimes the queue is barged by a singer. Someone who isn't actually even IN Roll Deep. They've be brought in on chorus duties, taking precious rhyme time away from people who've been in the queue for ages, actually. It's not fair, just because they can provide some melodic light relief from all of that truth-spitting, that they get to stroll right to the front. That's basically added an extra thirty seconds of arm waving and an agreeable "yeah yeah" or two, right there.

So don't be surprised if you notice that some of the more backgroundy Deepers are subtly shooting daggers at Alesha during her bits. They're only worried that they won't get a go on the mic.

== Background ==
"Take Control" had already been partially recorded by the time Roll Deep invited Dixon to guest vocal on the track, with the band saying: "we had the tune already and we wanted someone to feature on it, so we was just playing about and then her name come up. Then we sent her the song and she liked it, so we got her in the studio and then yeah, it went down well". It had been rumoured that the guest vocalists were girlband The Saturdays after comments made by Wiley suggested that there was to be a collaboration, however the group announced via their official Twitter account on 16 September that Dixon was to be the guest vocalist; the song premiered on BBC Radio 1Xtra the next day.

== Music video ==
The music video features Roll Deep and Alesha in a multi-storey car park with various people driving around on quad bikes and motorbikes. Roll Deep commented that "the video took about 7 hours, but it was shot at night and it was really horrible. It was a rainy night, and it was in a dark car park in Peckham, it wasn’t the best video shoot".

== Chart performance ==
"Take Control" debuted on the UK Singles Chart at number 29 on 7 November 2010 as well as at number 27 on the Scottish Singles and Albums Chart.

Chart (2010)	Peak Position
Scotland Singles (OCC)	27
UK Singles (OCC)	29
UK Singles Downloads (OCC)	27
