= In at the Deep End =

Studio album by Roll Deep
- Released: 6 June 2005
- Genre: Grime, hip hop
- Label: Relentless Records/Virgin Records

Roll Deep chronology
In at the Deep End (2005)	Rules and Regulations (2007)

Singles from In at the Deep End
- 1. "The Avenue" Released: 18 July 2005; 2. "Shake a Leg" Released: 10 October 2005

Professional ratings
Review scores
Source	Rating
AllMusic	2/5 stars
Collective	4/5 stars
HMV	4/5 stars
PopMatters	6/10

In at the Deep End is the debut album of London-based grime collective Roll Deep. It went silver in the United Kingdom, selling more than 85,000 copies. The album won Best Album at the 2005 Urban Music Awards.

"Shake a Leg" and "The Avenue" (or simply, "Avenue") were both top 40 hits.

== Track list ==
No.	Title	Writer(s)	Producer(s)	Length
1.	"Intro"	Richard Kylea Cowie; Marc Veira	Wiley	0:37
2.	"Flying Away" (featuring Alex Mills)	Cowie; Daniel Baker; Mohamed Ali; Alexandra Kollantai Mills; Zane Benson Williams; Kashif	Danny Weed; Wiley	3:08
3.	"The Avenue"	Cowie; Mark Tibenham; Lol Mason	Wiley	3:14
4.	"Show You" (featuring Jenna G)	Cowie; Javan Daniel Winston St. Prix; Jeffery Aboram; M. Ali; Adam Isaac Ali; Tom Canning; Michael Flowers; Ibrahim Atherly	Dirty Thoughts	4:04
5.	"Let It Out" (featuring Alex Mills)	Cowie; St Prix; Aboram; M. Ali; A. Ali; Baker	Danny Weed	3:38
6.	"Bus Stop" (featuring Alex Mills)	Cowie; Baker; Veira; Ryan Williams; Mills; Aboram; Valmon Burke; Rory McDade; Nigel Paterson; Juan Carlos Duran Martins	Danny Weed; Wiley	4:20
7.	"Be Careful" (featuring Alex Cartana)	Cowie; Aboram; Joseph; R. Williams; Adamou Ali; Ed Martin; Kay Ariran; Alan Ross; Dean Carlos McIntosh; Alexandra Rosamunda Cartana Marks	Target	2:58
8.	"When I'm Ere"	Cowie; Richard Orlando Roache; St. Prix; R. Williams; Veira; M. Ali; Aboram; Atherly; Matthew Reid; Peter O'Donoghue; Penny Libby Bridges; Paul Bernard Morton; Rory McDade; George Frederick Hassall	Danny Weed	3:05
9.	"Western Skit"	Veira; Atherly; Baker; M. Ali	Danny Weed	1:04
10.	"Shake a Leg"	Cowie; Baker; M. Ali; R. Williams; Pit Baumgarter; Pat Appleton; Enrique Madriguera; Eddie Woods	Danny Weed	3:15
11.	"Remember The Days" (featuring Alex Mills)	Cowie; Darren Joseph; M. Ali; J. Aboram; Mills	Target	3:44
12.	"People Don't Know" (featuring Donae'o)	Cowie; M. Ali; Ian Greenidge; Baker	Danny Weed	3:07
13.	"Heat Up"	Cowie; Aboram; M. Ali; R. Williams; St. Prix; Veira; Baker	Danny Weed; Wiley	4:01
14.	"Good Girl"	Cowie; Baker; Aboram; Jason Black; Angela Winbush	Danny Weed; Wiley	5:02
15.	"Poltergeist (Remix)"	Cowie; Veira; Aboram; M. Ali; A. Ali; R. Williams; Jermaine Orlando Coombes; Reid; Simeon Buchanan; P. Smith; Ricky Nek Neal; Aaron Cowie; St. Prix; Z. Williams; Patrick Knight	Target; Terror Danjah	3:32

== Charts ==
Chart (2009)	Peak position
UK Albums Chart	50

Sales and certifications

Country	Provider	Certification	Sales
United Kingdom	BPI	Silver	85,000+

== Featured on the album ==
Roachee, Wiley, Scratchy, Trim, Manga, Breeze, Flowdan, Jet Li, Brazen, Biggie Pitbull, Ricky Nek, Killa P, Jamakabi, Riko, Mega Montana, J2K, Alex Mills, Donae'o
