= Jodie Connor =

English recording artist, lyricist and goodwill ambassador

- Born: Jodie Connor; 8 May 1981 (age 45); Oldham, England
- Genres: R&B, soul, neo soul, dance, hip hop
- Occupations: Singer, lyricist, dancer, Goodwill ambassador
- Years active: 2003–present
- Labels: Polydor Records (UK) (2010–present); Takeover Entertainment (Worldwide) (2010–present); All Around the World (Europe) (2012–present)

Jodie Melanie Connor (born 8 May 1981) is an English singer, songwriter and Goodwill ambassador.

Connor's first number-one charted song was as a guest vocalist on Roll Deep's number-one single "Good Times". She was later signed by Polydor Records and Takeover Entertainment and released her debut solo single "Now or Never" on 16 January 2011, which peaked at number 14. A second single, "Bring It" featuring Tinchy Stryder was released on 20 February 2011 following its first play on BBC Radio 1 and debuted at number 11 on the UK R&B Chart. Connor's latest release was in 2018 on Solo Suspex's single “Back To You”.

== Music career ==
=== Early career ===
Early in Connor's career, she attended Saddleworth School for her high school education before attending Oldham College where she studied performing arts and graduated. Connor worked as receptionist in a sports club by day and gigged and performed in the evenings and on weekends. In 2003, Connor appeared as a contestant on the second series of the hit British television talent show Pop Idol. She was an early favourite of the judges, and made it to the final fifty of the competition, earning her the chance to perform live to the nation, but was eliminated after failing to finish in the top two in her group, instead placing fourth of ten. Connor was given a second chance by the judges, and was invited back for the Wildcard round, but again was unsuccessful in making it through to the next round, and was eliminated for good.

=== 2010–present: Breakthrough and first studio album ===
Connor returned to the spotlight in 2010, when she featured on grime collective Roll Deep's comeback single "Good Times"; which she helped to co-write. On 2 May 2010, the single debuted on the UK Singles Chart at number 1, where it remained for three consecutive weeks. The single not only marked Connor's first chart performance, but also Roll Deep's first top 10 hit. Connor then continued her breakthrough, appearing on videos "Electric Boogaloo (Find a Way)" and "Higher State" by Wiley and Bailey respectively. Following the success of Connor's breakthrough, she was signed to Polydor Records and Takeover Entertainment, spending the remainder of 2010 recording material for her debut album. On 16 January 2011, Connor released her debut single, "Now or Never" featuring Wiley, in the UK, which debuted at number 14 on the UK Singles Chart and number 6 on the UK R&B Chart. On 20 February 2011, Connor released her second single, "Bring It" featuring Tinchy Stryder, also in the UK, which debuted at number 11 on the UK R&B Chart, following its first play on BBC Radio 1.

In December 2010, Connor announced that she is to be spending time between Los Angeles and New York City working in the studio with Roc Nation-Songwriter's Makeba Riddick and James Fauntleroy II on her debut album, that was scheduled for release in 2011. The third single from the album entitled "Take You There" and featuring American rapper Busta Rhymes was released on 29 July 2012.

== Other ventures ==
In February 2011, Connor was announced as the new face of Tinchy Stryder's Star in the Hood female clothing line. In March 2011, Connor was appointed as a goodwill ambassador for Prince Charles' The Prince's Trust.

== Personal life ==
Connor's family are of Afro-Barbadian/White Barbadian descent. Her mother is named Kathleen. Connor lived in Shaw and Crompton.

She has two sons, one born in 2014 and one born in November 2016.

== Discography ==
=== Singles ===
==== As lead artist ====
Year	Single	Chart positions		
Year	Single	UK	UK R&B	SCO
2011	"Now or Never" (featuring Wiley)	14	6	18
2011	"Bring It" (featuring Tinchy Stryder)	37	11	32
2012	"Take You There" (featuring Busta Rhymes)	—	—	—
2012	"Talk" (featuring Stylo G)	—	—	—
2016	"Good Lovin"	—	—	—
"—" denotes a title that did not chart, or was not released in that territory.

==== As featured artist ====
Year	Single	Chart positions		Album
Year	Single	UK	SCO	Album
2010	"Good Times" (Roll Deep featuring Jodie Connor)	1	1	Winner Stays On
2018	"Back to You" (Solo Suspex featuring Jodie Connor)	—	—	Single only
"—" denotes a title that did not chart, or was not released in that territory.

=== Guest appearances ===
Year	Single	Album
2008	"Love of My Life" (Dawood and Knight featuring Jodie Connor)	Single only
2010	"Electric Boogaloo (Find a Way)" (Wiley featuring J2K and Jodie Connor)	Single only
2010	"Higher State" (Bailey featuring Jodie Connor)	Higher State

=== Music videos ===
Year	Title	Director	Ref.
2010	"Electric Boogaloo (Find a Way)" (with Wiley and J2K)	Charles Henrie Belleville	
2010	"Good Times" (with Roll Deep)	Rock Jacobs	
2011	"Now or Never" (with Wiley)	Johny Mourgue	
2011	"Bring It" (with Tinchy Stryder)	Luke Biggins & Yasha Malekzad	
2012	"Take You There" (with Busta Rhymes)	Rock Jacobs	
2013	"Redlights" (with DaWood)	Morgan Keyz	

=== Cameo appearances ===
Year	Title	Director(s)	Ref.
2010	"In My System" (Tinchy Stryder)	Kwasi Danquah III & Emil Nava	
2010	"Gangsta?" (Tinchy Stryder featuring Tinie Tempah)	Kwasi Danquah III & Adam Powell	

== See also ==
- List of artists who reached number one on the UK Singles Chart
