= Shabs Jobanputra =

British chief executive officer

Shabir "Shabs" Jobanputra is a UK music business figure, whose Outcaste and Relentless labels have had a sufficient impact on British popular culture to place him in the top 20 of The Guardian's list of the most influential ethnic minority figures in the media. He is currently MD of Relentless Records, which was re-launched as a stand-alone division of Sony Music in January 2012.

== Early life and career beginnings ==
Born at Mbale in Uganda on 19 September 1967, his father a Hindu factory manager and mother an Ismaili Muslim, Jobanputra was forced to leave Uganda in 1972 when Idi Amin expelled the country's Asian population. On arrival in the UK, he lived for a year in a refugee camp at West Malling in Kent, before his family were resettled in a council flat in St John's Wood, North London. After captaining London's schools cricket team and opening the bowling for Middlesex Colts, he began to establish a presence on the capital's dance music scene while still studying for a degree in history and politics at the University of East Anglia. DJing at house parties and for pirate stations including LWR led him to his first job in the music industry – as a junior partner with Simon Goffe's Heavyweight Management from 1992 to 1994, where he worked with UK chart hip-hop producers Double Trouble and Rebel MC and the Stoke Newington drum and bass band Shut Up And Dance among others.

== Outcaste Records ==
After starting his own PR company Media Village, which helped Sony records launch the UK careers of The Fugees and Jamiroquai by adapting the US promotional innovation of 'Street Teams' to the domestic market, Jobanputra co-founded (with college friend Paul Franklyn) the Outcaste label in 1995. Established as a joint venture with the New York hip-hop label Tommy Boy, Outcaste's 'Asian Beats' manifesto both reflected and amplified the increased visibility and confidence of British Asian culture in the mid and late 1990s. The label's first signing Nitin Sawhney went on to be nominated for the Mercury Prize and win a South Bank Show Award for his 1999 album Beyond Skin.

== Relentless Records ==
Originally set up (in 1999) as a joint venture with Ministry of Sound, Relentless was at first conceived as a vehicle for one-off dance singles. The label's debut release – Artful Dodger featuring Craig David's "Re-Rewind" – sold 700,000 copies and marked the point at which the UK garage genre moved from the underground into the pop mainstream. Subsequent hits included Daniel Bedingfield's "Gotta Get Thru This" and So Solid Crew's "21 Seconds". In the course of its subsequent evolution, first as part of EMI (from 2003 to 2009) and now Sony, Relentless broadened its musical base to launch the careers of Joss Stone and KT Tunstall among others. And in the 2009–11 period, when the label was sold to Virgin and Jobanputra became president of Virgin UK, artists he signed to the label included Emeli Sande, Professor Green, Swedish House Mafia and Deadmau5. During this three year timespan, Jobanputra also co-wrote an international top 10 hit – Jay Sean's "Eyes on You" – with Norwegian production team Stargate, and launched a legal challenge over rights to the Relentless brand name.
