= Turno (musician) =

- Born: Francesco Gaetano "Franko" Moliterno
- Origin: Bedford, England
- Occupation: Musician
- Website: www.turnodj.com

Francesco Gaetano Moliterno, known professionally as Franko Moliterno or Turno, is an English musician from Bedford. After losing his brother to suicide, Turno released a UK top 40 single about men's mental health. His charity single, "What's on Your Mind", was released in 2022. The single "Rave Out" with Charlotte Plank and Skepsis charted at No. 37 on the UK Singles Chart in 2023.

== Life and career ==
Francesco Gaetano "Franko" Moliterno is from Bedford, and had a brother, Fabio, who ran Escobarbers in Bedford town centre and committed suicide in September 2021 following years of poor mental health; both are of Italian descent. In October 2016, he set up a clothing range; its brand name, Time Is Now, was taken from the idea of not waiting until tomorrow to do things. He then released the albums Power and DNA. In February 2022, he released "Melia", a collaboration with free climber George King which had come about after King used Moliterno's "Abyss" in one of his tracks.

To mark one year of Fabio's death, Franko released a single, "What's On Your Mind" on 15 September 2021, which featured SJ Loq, Myleedan, Phizi, and Too Lippy. The song appeared throughout the first episode of the second series of We Are England, a BBC documentary series, which had been filmed after the gym and mental health charity Samsons Academy approached the BBC wanting to make a documentary about male suicide, and involved the remaining Moliternos; originally intended for broadcast the day after release, the death of Queen Elizabeth II meant that schedules were scrambled, and the programme actually aired three weeks later. A drum and bass remix of the song was released on 10 October 2022, that year's World Mental Health Day; profits from both versions went to Mind, a mental health charity.

In October 2022, Moliterno organised a mental health seminar with the record label DnB Allstars, and in December 2022, Moliterno organised a writer's camp with Ultra Records, which took place the following month; during this week, he recorded 22 tracks, the first of which was "Rave Out", which featured Skepsis and Charlotte Plank and discussed men's mental health. The track came out in June 2023, by which time Moliterno's "Killer" had charted at No. 94 on the UK Singles Downloads Chart; upon release, "Rave Out" charted at No. 37 on the UK Singles Chart.
