= Green Light (Roll Deep song) =

2010 single by Roll Deep

Single by Roll Deep

from the album Winner Stays On
- Released: 15 August 2010
- Recorded: 2010
- Genre: Electro-grime; dance
- Length: 3:57 (album version)
- Label: Relentless; Virgin
- Songwriters: I Atherly; A Ail; D Baker; J Black; Wiley; R Williams; J Dunne; J Hirst; V Akintola; K Alexander; S Charles
- Producers: Daniel J. Baker; J. Hirst; J. Dunne

Roll Deep singles chronology
"Good Times" (2010)	"Green Light" (2010)	"Take Control" (2010)

"Green Light" is a single by London-based grime music collective Roll Deep. It was released by digital download on 15 August 2010 on Relentless / Virgin Records. The MCs who make an appearance in the song are Wiley, J2K, Breeze, Brazen and Scratchy. It was co-written by UK singer Angel. "Green Light" debuted on the UK Singles Chart on 29 August 2010 at number one, marking the band's second number-one single.

== Critical reception ==
Robert Copsey of Digital Spy gave the song a three star rating, and said:

Roll Deep are fast becoming the very definition of a guilty pleasure. The arts of subtlety and sophistication might be lost on them, but boy do they know how to hit our musical G-spots. Having reached No.1 back in April with 'Good Times', the capital-based collective are back with another slab of grime/trance/pop built to fill dancefloors across the UK.

Over a jolting bassline and clubby urban beats, Wiley and crew search for ladies up for a bit of bump 'n' grind action. "I like what I see / Face lit up like a Christmas tree" raps Breeze - all she needs now is a couple of baubles, eh mate? Anyway, 'Green Light' isn't quite as brain-invading as its predecessor, but be warned, this one will eventually wriggle in and refuse to leave for a good while - a damn sight longer, we'd imagine, than these guys generally hang around the morning after..

== Track listings ==
CD single

1. "Green Light" (Radio Edit) – 3:57

Digital download

1. "Green Light" (Radio Edit) – 3:57
2. "Green Light" (Extended Mix) – 5:12
3. "Green Light" (Ill Blu Remix) – 5:11
4. "Green Light" (Future Freakz Remix) – 5:57
5. "Green Light" (Future Freakz Dub) – 5:57
6. "Green Light" (Instrumental) – 3:57

== Chart performance ==
"Green Light" debuted at number one on the UK Singles Chart on 22 August 2010, beating off competition from Eminem and Rihanna's "Love The Way You Lie", which reached number two. It would only stay number one for one week, falling down to number four, with Taio Cruz's "Dynamite" becoming number one instead. The album spent eight weeks in the top 40, before falling to number 54 on 17 October 2010. It became the 95th best-selling single in the UK of 2010.

== Charts and certifications ==
=== Weekly charts ===
Chart (2010)	Peak position
Ireland (IRMA)	18
Latvia (European Hit Radio)	27
Netherlands (Dutch Top 40)	34
UK Singles (Official Charts)	1
UK Hip Hop/R&B (Official Charts)	1

=== Year-end charts ===
Chart (2010)	Position
UK Singles (Official Charts Company)	95

=== Certifications ===
Region	Certification	Certified units/sales
United Kingdom (BPI)	Gold	400,000^{^}
^{^} Shipments figures based on certification alone.

== See also ==
- List of number-one singles from the 2010s (UK)
- List of number-one R&B hits of 2010 (UK)
