= Vibe Chemistry =

Producer from Deanshanger, England

- Born: Alex Morisco-Tarr
- Origin: Deanshanger, England
- Genres: Drum and bass
- Years active: 2016–present

Alex Morisco-Tarr, known professionally as Vibe Chemistry, is a producer from Deanshanger, England. He had two hits on the UK Singles Chart; "Balling" at No. 35, and "Dancing Is Healing" with Rudimental and Charlotte Plank at No. 5.

== Life and career ==
Alex Morisco-Tarr is from Deanshanger, United Kingdom. On 31 August 2016, he released "One Too Many Times" featuring Sanna Hartfield, a double-A side with Black Opps' "Babylon Recruits", and on 16 February 2017 he released a solo single, "Entertainment". On 31 August 2020, he released an album, "Entropy". On 31 January 2021, he, Magenta, Warhead, Jamezyuk, and Big T released a single, "Fall in Love"; on 15 February 2021, he released a solo single, "Loving You", and on 22 February 2021, he released another solo single, "Prophecy". On 2 March 2021, he released "Nothing Changed", and on 11 March 2021, he released the EP Diamonds and the single "Living Like This". On 14 April 2021, he released "Promises", a double-A side containing the tracks "To You" and "Bleeding", and on 1 May 2021 he released "Take Me Back". On 10 May 2021, he released "Like That", and on 24 May 2021, he released "Take Me There".

On 30 July 2021, he released the three-track EP Balling, his first release on a label, and on DnB Allstars; two weeks after the title track was re-released on 24 March 2022 featuring Songer, Mr Traumatik, Devilman, and OneDa, the song entered the UK Top 40, where it would peak at No. 35 and spend ten non-consecutive weeks there, five of which at No. 38. On 24 September 2021, he released "Conquer", and on 3 December 2021 he released the three-track Airplane Mode EP. On 7 January 2022, he featured on an Allstars MIC, a fortnightly DnB Allstars series, with A Little Sound, a member of Loud LDN. On 22 July 2022, he released "Baddest", which charted at No. 42 on the UK Independent Singles Chart, and was the title track from his 12 August 2022 EP of the same name. An edit of the track, featuring vocalists Pete & Bas, Jaykae, Azza & Grima, and P Money, would go on to be released in December 2023. On 30 December 2022, he released Loca, which was re-released on 11 May 2023 with a feature from Local, and on 27 January 2023, he released "Downfall" with Phibes. On 21 April 2023, he featured on "Dancing Is Healing" with Rudimental and Charlotte Plank, another member of Loud LDN, which charted at No. 5 on the UK Singles Chart and was certified Platinum by the British Phonographic Industry (BPI).

== Artistry ==
Morisco-Tarr takes inspiration from by Chase & Status, Netsky, Alcemist, goddard., and Disrupta.
