= Bass Boy =

DJ Bass Boy
- Genres: Miami bass, Electro
- Years active: 1992–1996
- Labels: Newtown Records

DJ Bass Boy is a Miami bass DJ first released in 1992 on Newtown Records. Bass Boy released three studio albums. The album I Got The Bass peaked at 86 on the Billboard charts.

== Discography ==
=== Studio albums ===
Year	Album	Label	Peak Chart
1992	"I Got the Bass"	Newtown Records	86
1993	"King of Quad"	Newtown Records	–
1996	"Licensed to Bass"	Newtown Records	–
