= Return of the Big Money Sound =

Studio album by Roll Deep
- Released: 6 September 2008
- Genre: Grime
- Label: Roll Deep Recordings

Roll Deep chronology
Rules and Regulations (2007)	Return of the Big Money Sound (2008)	Street Anthems (2009)

Return of the Big Money Sound is London grime collective Roll Deep's third album, released by Roll Deep Recordings in 2008. The singles from it are Do Me Wrong featuring Janée and Movin' In Circles featuring Kivanc. The album has sold over 6,000 copies in the UK.

== Track listing ==
#	Title	Performer(s)	Featured guest(s)	Producer(s)
1	Roll Deep Is Back	Wiley, Riko & Scratchy		Wiley
2	Do Me Wrong	Manga, J2K & Flow Dan	Janée	Target
3	Dargz Dem	Brazen, J2K & Flow Dan		Target
4	Give Up	Wiley, J2K, Skepta & Little Dee		Wiley
5	Movin' In Circles	Scratchy & Breeze	Kivanc	Danny Weed, Bass Played By G Vibes
6	U Know Us	Scratchy, J2K & Flow Dan		Danny Weed
7	Drinks	J2K & Wiley		Bless Beats
8	Club 7	J2K, Flow Dan, Brazen & Killa P		Wiley
9	Thunder & Lightning	Killa P, Scratchy, Brazen & J2K		Danny Weed
10	Night Life	Flow Dan	Bless Beats	Target
11	Fat Mac 90	Flow Dan, Breeze & Skepta		Danny Weed
12	We Can See It (Acoustic)	Wiley, J2K & Breeze		Danny Weed
