= Street Anthems =

Greatest hits album by Roll Deep
- Released: 19 October 2009
- Label: Roll Deep Recordings

Roll Deep chronology
Return of the Big Money Sound (2008)	Street Anthems (2009)	Winner Stays On (2010)

Tinchy Stryder chronology
Catch 22 (2009)	Street Anthems (2009)	Before the Storm (2010)

Dizzee Rascal chronology
Tongue n' Cheek (2009)	Street Anthems (2009)	The Fifth (2013)

Street Anthems is a compilation album by the British group Roll Deep, released on 19 October 2009. It features well-known tracks from 2001 to 2009 and some previously unreleased tracks, presenting tracks from the early members of Roll Deep such as Dizzee Rascal, Tinchy Stryder, Syer Barz, Trim, Bubbles, Biggie Pitbull and more.

== Track listing ==
1. Eskimo (Vocal)
2. When I'm 'Ere
3. Roll Deep Regular
4. Do This Ting
5. Bounce
6. Babylon Burner
7. Heat Up
8. Badman
9. Shake a Leg
10. Eskimo (Remix Vocal)
11. Remember the Days
12. They Should Know
13. Do Me Wrong (featuring Janee)
14. U Were Always
15. I Will Not Lose
16. Celebrate
17. Terrible
18. Avenue
19. Movin' in Circles

== Roll Deep members that are on the album ==
Wiley, Jet Le, Breeze, Skepta, Flow Dan, Scratchy, Brazen, Manga, J2K, Riko

== Former members of Roll Deep that are on the album ==
Dizzee Rascal, Tinchy Stryder, Trim, Biggie Pitbull, Jamakabi, Roachee, Bubbles
