= Good Times (Roll Deep song) =

2010 single by Roll Deep

Single by Roll Deep featuring Jodie Connor

from the album Winner Stays On
- Released: 26 April 2010
- Recorded: 2009
- Genre: Pop; R&B; dance
- Length: 3:41
- Label: Relentless Records, Virgin
- Songwriters: Wiley, I Atherly, A Ail, R Williams, B Preston, David Dawood, Jodie Connor, Charlotte Kelly
- Producer: David Dawood

Roll Deep singles chronology
"Shake a Leg" (2005)	"Good Times" (2010)	"Green Light" (2010)

Jodie Connor singles chronology
"Good Times" (2010)	"Now or Never" (2011)

Music video
- "Good Times" on YouTube

"Good Times" is a song by London-based grime music collective Roll Deep, which features vocals by Jodie Connor. It was released as a single via digital download on 25 April 2010 on Relentless / Virgin Records. The MCs who make an appearance in the song are Wiley, Breeze, Brazen and Scratchy. The song was produced by Takeover Entertainment producer David Dawood and the chorus topline was written by David Dawood, Jodie Connor and Charlotte. It has been parodied by Chris Moyles and Dave Vitty as "Good Rhyme" as the artist Roll Deeper.

== Critical reception ==
Nick Levine of Digital Spy gave the song a positive review stating:

2010 has already thrown up some pretty original pop hits (Plan B's 'She Said', Ellie Goulding's 'Starry Eyed'), some pretty classy ones Kelis's 'Acapella', Alicia Keys's 'Empire State of Mind Part II', and some that, though neither of these things, pretty much do the business regardless. 'Good Times', the new tune from London grime crew Roll Deep, falls firmly into that last category.

The urban clubby production owes a debt to Calvin Harris's recent Dizzee Rascal collaborations, the lyrics mine much the same party-on vibe as [the] Black Eyed Peas' 'I Gotta Feeling', and there are even a few GaGa-style "oh-oh-oh-oh"s chucked in for good measure. Desperately derivative it may be, but it's hard to take against a single that rhymes "late-night shopping" with "high street bopping", especially one with a socking great chorus like this..

== Track listings and formats ==
CD single
No.	Title	Length
1.	"Good Times" (radio edit)	3:43
2.	"Good Times" (extended club mix)	4:45
3.	"Good Times" (Ill Blu remix)	3:39
4.	"Good Times" (Soulmakers remix)	5:40
5.	"Good Times" (Ben Preston vocal remix)	6:42
6.	"Good Times" (Animal Attraction)	4:06
Total length:		24:36

Digital download
No.	Title	Length
1.	"Good Times" (radio edit)	3:43
2.	"Good Times" (Ill Blu remix)	3:39
3.	"Good Times" (Soulmakers remix)	5:40
4.	"Good Times" (Ben Preston vocal remix)	6:42
5.	"Good Times" (Animal Attraction)	4:06
Total length:		23:50

== Chart performance ==
"Good Times" debuted on the Irish Singles Chart on 29 April 2010 at number 42, peaking at number 13.

On 2 May 2010, "Good Times" entered the UK Singles Chart at No. 1. This marked Roll Deep's first top 10 hit, and their first ever number-one single in the UK. The single remained at the top spot for three consecutive weeks, being the second act to do so that year after Owl City spent 3 weeks at the top spot in February 2010 with "Fireflies".

== Music video ==
The music video starts with a countdown on an alarm clock, and features Connor singing in a white taxi, whilst wearing oversized glasses. The clip also features people getting ready for and having a night out at a club, including the members of Roll Deep rapping while Connor sings with them.

== Personnel ==
- Wiley - vocals
- Breeze - vocals
- Brazen - vocals
- Scratchy - vocals

With:

- Jodie Connor - vocals (chorus)

== Charts ==
Chart (2010–2011)	Peak position
Czech Republic Airplay (ČNS IFPI)	9
European Hot 100 Singles	7
Ireland (IRMA)	13
Japan (Japan Hot 100)	42
Netherlands (Dutch Top 40)	21
Slovakia Airplay (ČNS IFPI)	6
Scottish Singles Sales (Official Charts)	1
UK Singles (Official Charts)	1
UK Dance (Official Charts)	1

== Certifications ==
Region	Certification	Certified units/sales
United Kingdom (BPI)	Platinum	600,000^{‡}
^{‡} Sales+streaming figures based on certification alone.
