= DJ Target =

British DJ and radio presenter

- Born: Darren Joseph; July 1980 (age 46)
- Origin: Bow, London, England
- Occupations: DJ, radio personality, record producer
- Years active: 1999–present
- Formerly of: Roll Deep, Pay As U Go

Darren Joseph (born 29 July 1980), known professionally as DJ Target, is an English DJ, radio personality and record producer from Bow, London. He is best known for being part of grime collective Roll Deep and for various presenting roles with the BBC, including a long-standing daytime show on BBC Radio 1Xtra and the BBC Three talent show The Rap Game UK which he co-presents alongside Krept & Konan.

== Career ==
Joseph learnt to mix vinyl on decks owned by his friend Slimzee, and chose the stage name Target spontaneously after looking around a room for inspiration and landing on a turntable target light. His first formal experience in the music industry was a work experience placement at the jungle and drum and bass record label Moving Shadow while attending St Joseph's Academy School in Lee Terrace, Blackheath. He and childhood friends Wiley, Breeze, MC Jay and MC Caspit initially performed jungle under the name SS Crew, debuting on pirate radio with a weekly 1AM show on the Hackney station Chillin FM, and would often invite Maxwell D. Following the station's closure, SS Crew were invited to join Rinse FM as inaugural residents, broadcasting on Sundays from 9-11pm. Joseph recognised that the most successful jungle DJs were boosting their profiles by also producing their own songs and was inspired to do the same; with DJ Trend, he formed the duo TNT (Trend 'N' Target), and their first single "2 Degrees" was signed to Nicky Blackmarket's label Kartoons for a £500 advance. Trend later continued to use the TNT alias as a solo venture with Joseph's blessing, repurposing the acronym to mean Treading New Territories.

With the advent of UK garage music, Joseph and Wiley shifted to hosting a Sunday night garage show on Rinse, and occasionally guested alongside Major Ace and God's Gift on Deja Vu FM. Following Maxwell D's release from Feltham after a three-year sentence for robbery, he, Joseph and Wiley formed a new crew by the name Ladies Hit Squad, a nod to their positive reception from female listeners. In summer 2000, Joseph joined the nine-man garage crew Pay As U Go as a founding member, which effectively absorbed Ladies Hit Squad; it was formed by merging the members of multiple Rinse radio shows at the suggestion of Major Ace, after Plague Alero had begun to refer to his show as "the Pay As U Go show" in reference to a mobile network flaw at the time that allowed the public to make free calls from pay-as-you-go phones. Between the collective's DJs, they had three weekly radio shows: Geeneus would DJ on Monday nights, while Slimzee continued his Sunday afternoon show and Joseph took over on Sunday nights, and the group's MCs would attend varying shows to ensure that they had the chance to perform with each DJ. Target has claimed that at the time they released the single "Know We", the group had "around three bookings a week each" and "were earning a few hundred [pounds] for each one". He was also active as a producer for the group at this time, and most notably co-produced their April 2002 single "Champagne Dance" alongside Geeneus, which was released via Sony Music and peaked at number thirteen on the UK Singles Chart.

Joseph is a former member of Roll Deep.

Joseph began hosting part of the 1Xtra Takeover, a simulcast across BBC Radio 1 and Radio 1Xtra, in September 2013.

In 2018, Joseph wrote a book titled Grime Kids. Joseph became the talent and music lead at Radio 1Xtra in July 2018, but left the role in June 2021. Joseph has been working with Krept and Konan on The Rap Game UK where they find the next rap star. Website=https://www.bbc.co.uk/programmes/p07jwq62

In 2021, Joseph fronted a six-episode series on BBC Three called Tonight with Target.

In 2022, it was announced that Joseph would be leaving Radio 1, ending the station's simulcast of the 1Xtra Takeover. However, he continued presenting on Radio 1Xtra since.
