= Rules and Regulations (album) =

Rules And Regulations

Studio album by Roll Deep
- Released: January 2007
- Genre: Grime
- Label: Roll Deep Recordings

Roll Deep chronology
In at the Deep End (2005)	Rules And Regulations (2007)	Return of the Big Money Sound (2008)

Professional ratings
Review scores
Source	Rating
The Observer	3/5 stars

Rules and Regulations is the second studio album by British grime group Roll Deep and it was released in 2007 on Roll Deep Recordings. The album features grime MCs who were not members of the crew, such as Tempa T and Frisco, much more than their first album.

== Track listing ==
#	Title	Performer(s)	Featured guest(s)	Producer(s)
1	"Flame Grilled Whopper"	Wiley, Breeze, Flow Dan, Scratchy, Riko & Trim		Wiley
2	"Badman"	Flow Dan, Scratchy, Jet Le & Breeze		Target & Danny Weed
3	"Celebrate"	Skepta, Flow Dan, Scratchy & Jet Le		Danny Weed
4	"Stampers"	Wiley, Riko, Skepta, Breeze, Flow Dan & Mega		Wiley
5	"Ride or Die Chick"	Manga & Jammer	Frisco	Target
6	"Do This Ting"	Wiley, Flow Dan & Skepta		Wiley
7	"Bring Ur Crew Then"	Skepta & Jammer	Tempa T	Bless Beatz
8	"Bad Luck"	Scratchy, Jet Le, Breeze & Wiley		Danny Weed
9	"Floating Thru da Sky"	Breeze, Jet Le & Manga		Chunky Bizzle
10	"Rules and Regulations"	Flow Dan, Trim & Scratchy		Target
11	"Respect Us"	Manga, Scratchy, Flow Dan & Skepta		Target
12	"Babylon Burner"	Wiley, Riko, Flow Dan, Breeze & Scratchy		Wiley
13	"Something New'"	Scratchy, Jet Le, Flow Dan & Riko		Danny Weed
14	"Weed Man"	Flow Dan & Killa P		Target
15	"Racist People"	Scratchy, Trim & Wiley		TNT
16	"Penpals"	Jet Le, Flow Dan, Breeze & Riko		Target
17	"Hickory Dickory"	Flow Dan, Riko, Scratchy, Breeze & Trim		Danny Weed
18	"Roll Deep Regular 2007"	Skepta, Flow Dan, Breeze, Riko, Scratchy & Jet Le		Skepta
