= Relentless Records =

British boutique and independent record label

- Parent company: Sony Music Entertainment (SME) (2012–present); Previous: EMI (2009–2011); Universal Music Group (2011–2012)
- Founded: 1 December 1999; 26 years ago
- Founder: Shabs Jobanputra; Paul Franklyn
- Distributor: Sony Music UK
- Genre: Various
- Country of origin: UK
- Official website: www.relentlessrecs.com

Relentless Records is a record label currently headed by co-founder Shabs Jobanputra. Originally known for UK garage singles such as Artful Dodger's "Re-Rewind" and B-15 Project's "Girls Like Us", Relentless has also published albums by Joss Stone, KT Tunstall, Union of Knives and Cage the Elephant.

== Ownership ==
Relentless Records was formally registered as a company on 1 December 1999. After first working with Virgin Records in 2003, the label was sold to it in 2009 (when Virgin was at that time a label of EMI Records).

Affected by the November 2011 dissolution of EMI Group (the parent company of Virgin Records), Virgin's recorded music business was sold to Universal Music UK, a division of Universal Music Group. Propitiously, Jobanputra had departed EMI in April 2011, with a deal returning control of the Relentless name to him whilst leaving the label's roster signed to the major.

In January 2012, Relentless became part of Sony Music in the UK, reuniting Jobanputra with his former EMI/Virgin colleague Nick Gatfield.

== Artists currently signed to Relentless Records ==
Notable artists signed under Relentless include:

- Alan Walker
- Bad Boy Chiller Crew
- Bryson Tiller (UK only)
- Headie One
- Maluma
- Nicky Jam
- Pinkfong
- Steve Aoki
- Tom Walker
- Bimini Bon-Boulash

== Artists formerly signed to Relentless Records ==
Notable artists formerly signed under Relentless include:

- 3 of a Kind
- Artful Dodger
- B-15 Project
- Bondax
- Cage the Elephant
- Chris Malinchak
- Daniel Bedingfield
- DJ Pied Piper and the Masters of Ceremonies
- Jay Sean
- Joey Badass
- Joss Stone
- Justin Nozuka
- Kristine Blond
- KT Tunstall
- Lethal Bizzle
- Mark Ryder
- Martin Solveig
- Misha B
- Ms Dynamite
- Nadia Rose
- Not3s
- Only Boys Aloud
- Danny Erskine
- Professor Green
- Roll Deep
- Seth Lakeman
- So Solid Crew
- Union of Knives
- Wiley

== See also ==
- List of independent UK record labels
