= Roll Deep =

British grime crew formed by Wiley in 2001

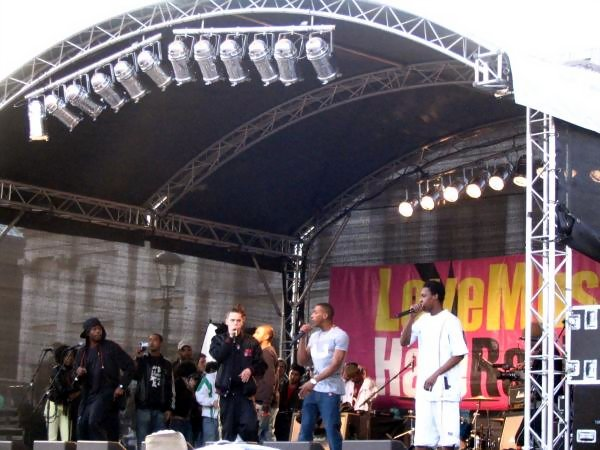
- Roll Deep performing at the Love Music Hate Racism Festival in Barnsley

Background information
- Origin: Bow, London, England
- Genres: Grime; British hip hop
- Works: Roll Deep discography
- Years active: 2001–2013; 2024–present
- Labels: Roll Deep Records (2002–present); Virgin Records (2005–2010); Relentless Records (2005–2010); Cooking Vinyl Records (2012); Relentless Records (2013)
- Members: Wiley; Scratchy; Flowdan; Breeze; Brazen; Roachee; Manga Saint Hilare; Riko Dan; DJ Target; DJ Karnage; J2K
- Past members: Dizzee Rascal; Tinchy Stryder; Biggie Pitbull; Dom P; Wonder; Jamakabi; Bubbles; DJ Bionics; Jme; Jet Le; Trim; DJ Maximum; Syer Barz; Skepta; Jammer; Danny Weed; Killa P; Little Dee

Roll Deep (formerly Roll Deep Entourage) are a British grime crew. They were founded in 2001 by Wiley shortly before the disbandment of UK garage crew Pay As U Go Cartel.

The group have had two UK No. 1 singles, "Good Times" and "Green Light", won an Urban Music Award, and between 2001 and 2012 they released five studio albums before entering an indefinite hiatus in 2013.

Current member Wiley and former members Dizzee Rascal and Tinchy Stryder have gone on to be successful solo artists in the UK, with songs that have topped charts. Flowdan won a Grammy Award for Best Dance/Electronic Recording in 2024 for the song 'Rumble' (with Fred Again and Skrillex).

== History ==
Inspired by the success of So Solid Crew, Wiley founded the UK garage crew Ladies Hit Squad alongside DJ Target and Maxwell D around the end of the 20th century (2000). At the same time, Plague, Slimzee, Geeneus, Major Ace and God's Gift were enjoying relative success with another garage crew called Pay As U Go Kartel. Geeneus and Slimzee who also both founded Rinse FM, invited both Wiley and Flowdan to join Pay As U Go. The group released their debut single, "Know We", in 2000.

Two years later, Wiley, Flowdan, Jamakabi and Breeze recorded a song entitled "Terrible", which record stores perceived to be a follow-up to "Know We". Wiley decided he didn't want to release "Terrible" under the Pay As U Go name, so Flowdan suggested the name Roll Deep: a homage to the phrase 'rolling deep', popular within bashment songs. Flowdan cites the introduction of Dizzee Rascal to Roll Deep and his subsequent popularity as the reason why Pay As U Go eventually disbanded and Roll Deep rose to prominence.

The crew distributed a number of mixtapes and vinyl singles independently before being signed to a major label and releasing their debut album In at the Deep End in June 2005. Four singles were released from the album: "Heat Up", "The Avenue", "When I'm 'Ere" and "Shake a Leg". They won an Urban Music Award the same year. The album’s accessible production drew mixed reactions within the scene. Writing in What Do You Call It? From Grassroots to the Golden Era of UK Rap (2024), David Kane noted that “what these records did in hindsight—with remarkable prescience in the case of In at the Deep End—was expand the musical palette of grime.” In the same book, DJ Target reflected that “at first, people from the scene turned their noses up at it, but if you look at that scene now, a lot of the main artists have crossed over.”

In October 2006, Roll Deep participated in a project of Tate Modern museum where various groups and songwriters were invited to choose a work that inspired them from the gallery's collection of modern art and then write a track about it. Roll Deep's submission, Searching, was inspired by the Anish Kapoor sculpture Ishi's Light, and can be heard on headphones in front of the work or on the Tate Tracks website.

Their second album Rules and Regulations was released in 2007, followed by the release of Return of the Big Money Sound in 2008.

The group got their first UK No. 1 single with the song "Good Times" in May 2010 and the group's second UK No. 1 single was "Green Light" in August 2010. Their next single was "Take Control", featuring R&B singer Alesha Dixon, which charted at No. 29 on 7 November 2010. Roll Deep released their next single "Picture Perfect" (produced by Agent X) peaking at No. 19 in the indie charts.

Roll Deep have appeared on BBC 1Xtra on numerous occasions. Members that appeared on the show include Wiley, Scratchy, Flowdan, Breeze, Brazen, Riko and Manga. In later years the group's work began to take a more mainstream oriented approach which led to members such as Riko and Flowdan becoming less active within the crew. In March 2014 Flowdan confirmed in an interview on Rinse FM the group's current hiatus and discussed the lack of drive from other members to work on music collectively. However many members of the crew are still active as solo artists and none have ruled out a return to writing music together in the future.

In August 2018, DJ Karnage, Breeze, Manga, Brazen, Scratchy, Riko Dan and Flowdan all appeared at Riko Dan's Hard Food EP launch party, collectively billed as Roll Deep on the lineup. Later the same month, Manga told Grime.com: "We've got tunes, but it just takes long to organise. We've got new songs — or we had new songs — I don't know where they are, I think Wiley's got them somewhere. But we've started about three [new] Roll Deep albums between us, but... oh, it's just long to get everyone together, man. Wiley lives in Cyprus, Target's on radio everyday, Flowdan's doing shows everyday, J2K's making restaurants and creps and all these type of ting there." In August 2019, Scratchy and Flowdan appeared as Roll Deep on "Don't Lie", featuring Jammer and taken from his Lord of the Mics VIII compilation album.

After making occasional live appearances between 2018 and 2024 with a rotating cast of members, the group created a new Instagram page in December 2024, debuting their newest formation at Lethal Bizzle's '20 Years of "Pow!"' show and making impromptu public appearances alongside DJ AG and Nasty Crew's Mak 10. In 2026, they signed to the Fabric record label FABRICLIVE to release a comeback single, "B.U.N", and mixtape, Best in the Game—their first since 2012's No Comment Star.

== Members ==
=== Current members ===
- Wiley (Richard Kylea Cowie) – The leader of the crew/group/collective. Formed the crew and has featured on many Roll Deep songs. Achieved his first number-one's with the group in 2010 with song's Good Times and Green Light. Wiley has announced via Twitter that he is still a member of Roll Deep and always will be, but was not featured on the album in 2012.
- Scratchy (Ryan Robert Williams) – One of the founder members of Roll Deep from 2002. Featured on many Roll Deep tracks like "When I'm 'Ere", "Badman" & "Heat Up". He also featured on Roll Deep's number-one singles 'Good Times' and 'Green Light'. He has a distinctive flow. Also known as Scratchy Demus.
- Flowdan (Marc Veira) – One of the founder members of Roll Deep from 2002. Features on many Roll Deep tracks like 'Celebrate', 'Heat Up' & 'Club 7' Has a deep voice and speaks in patois, although the accent is not as strong as Riko's.
- Breeze (Ibrahim Ali) – One of the founder members of Roll Deep from 2002. Older brother of fellow Roll Deep member Brazen. He featured on Roll Deep's number-one single's 'Good Times' and 'Green Light'. Known for witty lyrics and distinctive style.
- Brazen (Ardom Ali) – Member of Roll Deep from 2004, and younger brother of Breeze. He featured on Roll Deep's number-one singles 'Good Times' and 'Green Light'. Known for his aggressive voice on the mic.
- Manga (Matthew Reid) – Member of Roll Deep from 2004. Featured on Roll Deep tracks "When I'm 'Ere", "Poltergeist (Remix)" and "Do Me Wrong". Has a speedy, jumpy flow. Now going by the name Manga Saint Hilare.
- Riko Dan (Zane Benson Williams) – Member of Roll Deep from 2004. Well known for his distinctive and sometimes very aggressive style of rapping in Patois. Took a back seat from the crew in early 2010 to concentrate on his solo career, though he has stated on Twitter he will never leave Roll Deep.
- DJ Target (Darren Joseph) – Long-time member of Roll Deep from 2002. Main Producer and DJ of Roll Deep. Made the instrumentals for many Roll Deep tracks. Since gone on to host his own BBC Radio 1Xtra show.
- DJ Karnage – Long-time member of Roll Deep from 2002. He is the cousin of former member Trim, and Roll Deep's main DJ. A former Roll Deep MC.
- J2K (Jason Black) – Member of Roll Deep from 2008, although he did feature on track "Good Girl" on their 2005 album "In at the Deep End". He has featured on many Roll Deep tracks, including number-one single 'Green Light'.

=== Past members ===
- Dizzee Rascal (Dylan Mills) – Joined Roll Deep when asked to provide the hook for the track "Bounce" in 2002, but left Roll Deep in 2003 after the Ayia Napa stabbing incident. Featured on tracks "Bounce", "U Were Always", "Roll Deep Regular" and "Eskimo Vocal". He is now one of the most well-known grime artists in the UK, with five number-ones.
- Tinchy Stryder (Kwasi Danquah III) – affiliate of Roll Deep from 2002, but had his own grime crew Ruff Sqwad and focus on his solo career. He featured on Roll Deep's 2004 mixtape Creeper Vol. 2 and performed on some songs including "U Were Always" in 2002, which was released years later on Roll Deep's compilations album Street Anthems in 2009. Has since recorded many top 40 hits including two number-ones.
- Biggie Pitbull – Also known as Pitbull T, he was an early member of Roll Deep from 2002. He featured on tracks 'Bounce' as well as 'Poltergeist Relay' and other songs. Had an angry voice. He is Wiley's cousin. Left the group in 2004.
- Wonder – Early member of Roll Deep from 2002. Wonder was a producer for the group, but he left in 2004. He now no longer produces grime.
- Jamakabi – Early member of Roll Deep from 2002, he featured on early tracks like 'Terrible', 'Roll Deep Regular' & 'Bounce'. He left the group at Wiley's suggestion around 2004, and has speculated that they wanted to downsize the crew while in talks about a record deal.
- Bubbles – Early member of Roll Deep from 2002, but left the group in 2004. He featured on the song 'Bounce' amongst others. Released a solo mixtape in 2008.
- DJ Bionics – Early member of Roll Deep from 2002. Bionics was one of the DJ's for the group, but left in 2004 to DJ in support of his cousin Kano.
- Jet Le – Early member of Roll Deep from 2002. He featured on albums In at the Deep End and Rules and Regulations. Had a verse on 'Celebrate'. Left the group in 2006.
- Trim (Javan St. Prix) – Member of Roll Deep from 2004, featured on tracks 'Heat Up' and 'When I'm 'Ere'. Has an off-kilter, poetic flow. He left the group in 2006, after a disagreement with Flowdan. Also known as Trimbal.
- Roachee (Richard Roach) – Member of Roll Deep from 2004, joined the group the same time as his cousin Trim. Featured on 'When I'm Here'. He left the group in 2006, as he was sent to prison.
- DJ Maximum – Affiliate of Roll Deep from 2004. Part of grime crew Boy Better Know.
- Skepta (Joseph Adenuga) – Affiliate of Roll Deep had his own grime crew Boy Better Know and his solo career. Skepta appeared on Roll Deep's album Rules and Regulations and featured on the hit 'Celebrate'.
- Jammer (Jahmek Power) – Affiliate of Roll Deep from 2006, Appeared on Roll Deep's album Rules and Regulations and featured on tracks 'Ride or Die Chick' and 'Bring Ur Crew Then'. Part of another grime crew Boy Better Know.
- Danny Weed – Long-time member of Roll Deep from 2002. He was a producer for the group, but left in 2010.
- Killa P (Patrick Knight) – Member of Roll Deep from 2006, and the cousin of Roll Deep member Flowdan. Killa P's flow is like Riko's, he MC's in patois. Featured on the track "Club 7". Left the group in 2010.
- Little Dee – Member of Roll Deep from 2008. He featured on one Roll Deep track 'Give Up', but left the group in 2008 on good terms to pursue his own solo career. Currently a member of OGz alongside P Money.
- Syer Barz – Member of Roll Deep briefly around 2004. Also former member of the Dagenham-based O.T. Crew.
- Jme (Jamie Adenuga) – Affiliate of Roll Deep from 2006. He is Skepta's younger brother. Part of grime collective Boy Better Know.

== Politics ==
Roll Deep have been consistent supporters of Love Music Hate Racism and have played at many of the organisation's more high-profile events including the memorial for murdered teenager Anthony Walker, and released a single and video of "Racist People", from the Rules and Regulations LP.

== Discography ==
=== Studio albums ===
- 2005: In at the Deep End
- 2007: Rules and Regulations
- 2008: Return of the Big Money Sound
- 2010: Winner Stays On
- 2012: X

=== Compilation album ===
- 2009: Street Anthems

=== Mixtapes ===
- 2003: Creeper Vol. 1
- 2004: Creeper Vol. 2
- 2004: Rollin' Deeper
- 2006: Roll Deep Presents Grimey Vol. 1
- 2010: Say No More
- 2012: No Comment Star
- 2026: Best in the Game Mixtape

== Timeline ==
=== 2002–2003 ===
The Original and First line up of Roll Deep:

- Wiley
- Dizzee Rascal
- Tinchy Stryder
- Scratchy
- Flowdan
- Breeze
- DJ Target
- DJ Karnage
- Danny Weed
- Jet Le
- Biggie Pitbull
- Dom P
- Wonder
- Jamakabi
- Bubbles
- DJ Bionics

=== 2004–2005 ===
Second line up of the group:

Once Dizzee Rascal, Tinchy Stryder, Biggie Pitbull, Dom P, Wonder, Jamakabi, Bubbles and DJ Bionics left the group, Wiley brought in 7 new members for their 2005 album "In at the Deep End".

- Wiley
- Scratchy
- Flowdan
- Breeze
- DJ Target
- DJ Karnage
- Danny Weed
- Jet Le
- Brazen – Joined the group in 2003
- Manga – Joined the group in 2004
- Riko – Joined the group in 2004
- Trim – Joined the group in 2003
- Roachee – Joined the group in 2004
- DJ Maximum – Joined the group in 2004
- Syer Bars – Joined the group in 2004

=== 2006–2007 ===
Third line up of the group:

Once Jet Le, Trim, Roachee, DJ Maximum & Syer Bars left the group, Wiley brought in 3 new members for their 2007 album "Rules and Regulations" and one new member to contribute to the album.

- Wiley
- Scratchy
- Flowdan
- Breeze
- DJ Target
- DJ Karnage
- Danny Weed
- Brazen
- Manga
- Riko
- Killa P – Joined the group in 2006
- Skepta – Joined the group in 2006
- Jammer- Joined the group in 2006
- JME - Joined the group in 2006. Left the same year.

=== 2008–2010 ===
Fourth line up of the group:

Once Skepta, JME & Jammer left the group, Wiley brought in 2 new members for their 2008 album "Return of the Big Money Sound".

- Wiley
- Scratchy
- Flowdan
- Breeze
- DJ Target
- DJ Karnage
- Danny Weed
- Brazen
- Manga
- Riko
- Killa P
- J2K – Joined the group in 2008
- Little Dee – Joined the group in 2008

=== 2010–2012 ===
Fifth lineup of the group:

Once Danny Weed, Killa P & Little Dee left the group, Wiley replaced them with female R&B singer Tania Foster.

- Wiley
- Scratchy
- Flowdan
- Breeze
- DJ Target
- DJ Karnage
- Brazen
- Manga
- Riko
- J2K
- Tania Foster – Joined the group in 2011

=== 2024–present ===
Since Roll Deep's return from hiatus, co-founders Wiley and Flowdan have not left the group but are not currently among the members booked as Roll Deep.

- DJ Karnage
- Manga Saint Hilare
- Scratchy
- Breeze
- Riko Dan
- Roachee
- DJ Target – for select appearances
