= AJ Tracey discography =

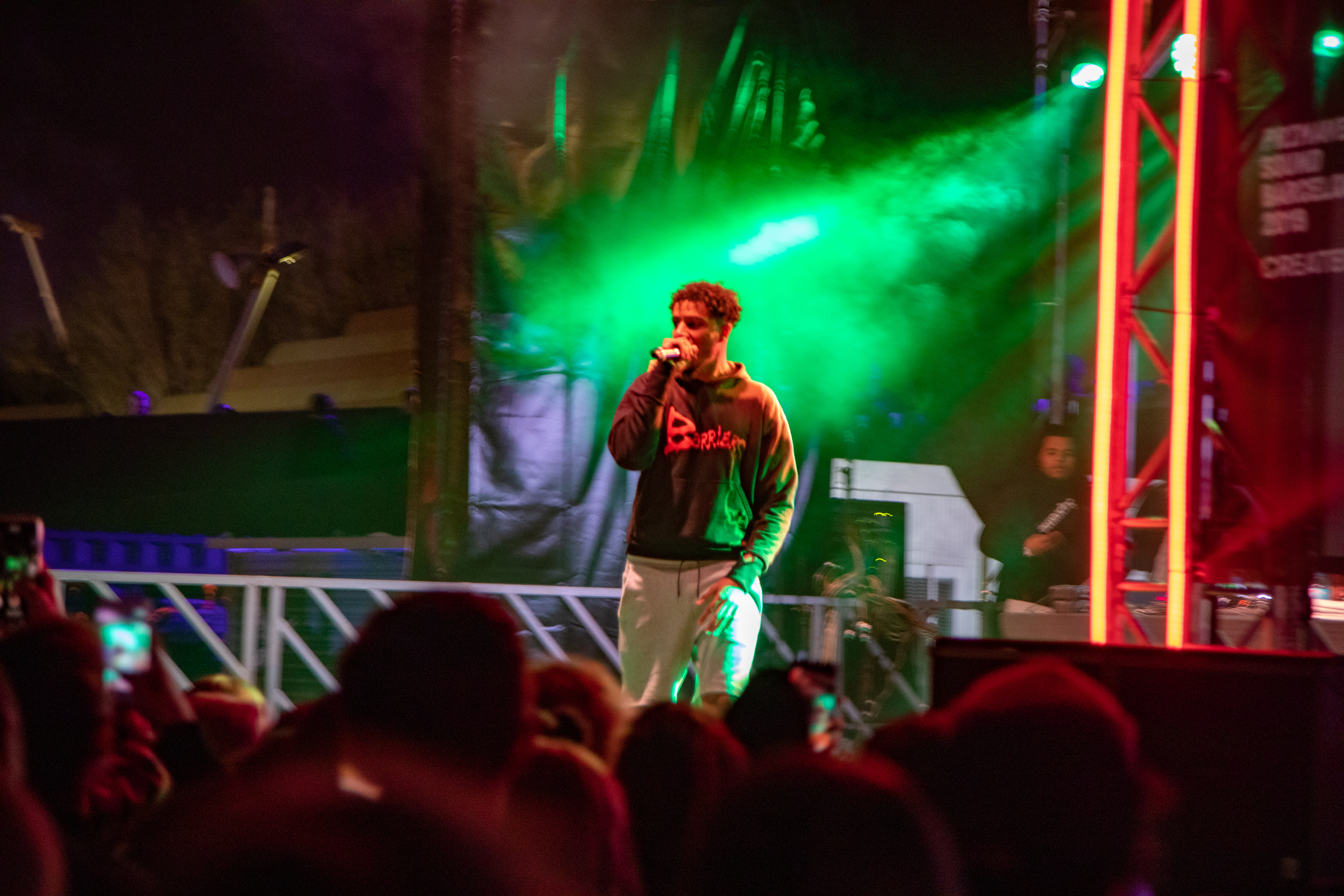
- Studio albums: 3
- EPs: 6
- Compilation albums: 1
- Singles: 24
- Mixtapes: 2

British rapper AJ Tracey has released three studio albums, one compilation album, two mixtapes, six extended plays, and twenty-four singles.

== Albums ==
=== Studio albums ===
Title	Details	Peak chart positions					Certifications
Title	Details	UK	UK R&B	AUS	IRE	NL	Certifications
AJ Tracey	Released: 8 February 2019; Label: Self-released; Formats: CD, digital download, streaming	3	1	—	15	108	BPI: Gold
Flu Game	Released: 16 April 2021; Label: Revenge Records; Formats: CD, LP, cassette, digital download, streaming	2	1	12	5	61	BPI: Gold
Don't Die Before You're Dead	Released: 13 June 2025; Label: Revenge Records; Formats: CD, digital download, streaming	37	1	—	—	—	

=== Mixtapes ===
Title	Details
Didn't Make the Cut (as Looney)	Released: 13 September 2012; Label: Self-released; Formats: Digital download
No More Looney (as Looney)	Released: 30 August 2014; Label: Self-released; Formats: Digital download

=== Compilations ===
Title	Details
Left Back	Released: 9 December 2015; Label: Self-released; Formats: Digital download

== Extended plays ==
Title	Details	Peak chart positions
Title	Details	UK
The Front	Released: 12 June 2015; Label: Self-released; Format: Digital download	—
Alex Moran	Released: 4 December 2015; Label: Self-released; Format: Digital download	—
AJ's Stocking Filler	Released: 25 December 2015; Label: Self-released; Format: Digital download	—
Lil Tracey	Released: 2 December 2016; Label: Self-released; Format: Digital download	—
Secure the Bag!	Released: 6 October 2017; Label: Self-released; Format: Digital download	13
Secure the Bag! 2	Released: 27 November 2020; Label: Self-released; Format: Digital download	75
"—" denotes a recording that did not chart or was not released in that territory.

== Singles ==
=== As lead artist ===
Title	Year	Peak chart positions							Certifications	Album
Title	Year	UK	UK R&B	UK Dance	UK Ind.	AUS	IRE	NZ Hot	Certifications	Album
"Packages"	2016	—	—	—	—	—	—	—		Non-album singles
"Thiago Silva" (with Dave)	2016	36	7	—	1	—	38	—	BPI: 2× Platinum; RMNZ: Platinum	Non-album singles
"Leave Me Alone"	2016	—	—	—	—	—	—	—		Non-album singles
"The Rumble" (with M. J. Cole)	2016	—	—	—	—	—	—	—		Non-album singles
"Buster Cannon"	2016	—	—	—	—	—	—	—		Lil Tracey
"LA4AWeek" (featuring Swoosh and Sloan Evans)	2017	—	—	—	—	—	—	—		Non-album singles
"False 9"	2017	—	—	—	—	—	—	—		Non-album singles
"Blacked Out"	2017	—	—	—	17	—	—	—		Secure the Bag!
"Quarterback (Secure the Bag!)"	2017	75	33	—	8	—	—	—		Secure the Bag!
"Mimi"	2018	51	25	—	7	—	—	—	BPI: Silver	Non-album single
"Butterflies" (featuring Not3s)	2018	19	7	—	2	—	98	—	BPI: 2× Platinum	AJ Tracey
"3AM" (with Baauer and Jae Stephens)	2018	—	—	—	—	—	—	—	BPI: Silver	Non-album singles
"Lo(v/s)er"	2018	38	24	—	6	—	—	—	BPI: Gold	Non-album singles
"Doing It"	2018	56	25	—	6	—	—	—		AJ Tracey
"Psych Out!"	2019	18	9	—	3	—	—	—	BPI: Silver	AJ Tracey
"Necklace" (with Jay Critch)	2019	—	—	—	22	—	—	—		AJ Tracey
"Ladbroke Grove"	2019	3	2	—	1	—	6	—	BPI: 4× Platinum; RMNZ: Platinum	AJ Tracey
"Cat Pack"	2019	56	37	—	6	—	82	—		AJ Tracey
"Floss" (featuring MoStack and Not3s)	2019	22	16	—	3	—	50	—	BPI: Silver	AJ Tracey
"Kiss and Tell" (with Skepta)	2019	31	20	—	—	—	53	—		Non-album single
"Rain" (with Aitch featuring Tay Keith)	2020	3	3	—	—	61	10	—	BPI: 2× Platinum; ARIA: Platinum; RMNZ: Platinum	Polaris
"Dinner Guest" (featuring MoStack)	2020	5	4	—	—	—	13	—	BPI: Platinum; RMNZ: Gold	Flu Game
"West Ten" (Note: "West Ten" is also included on Mabel’s debut studio album, High Expectations.) (with Mabel)	2020	5	—	1	—	—	16	20	BPI: Platinum; RMNZ: Gold	Flu Game
"Bringing It Back" (Note: "Bringing It Back" is also included on Digga D’s mixtape, Made in the Pyrex.) (with Digga D)	2021	5	3	—	—	—	—	14	BPI: Silver	Flu Game
"Anxious"	2021	34	17	—	—	—	36	—		Flu Game
"Little More Love"	2021	21	9	—	2	—	36	12	BPI: Gold; RMNZ: Gold	Flu Game
"Reasonable"	2022	—	—	—	25	—	—	29		Non-album singles
"Seoul"	2022	58	19	—	2	—	89	20	BPI: Silver	Non-album singles
"Wifey Riddim 4"	2023	—	—	—	—	—	—	—		Non-album singles
"Joga Bonito"	2024	69	32	—	18	—	—	36		Don't Die Before You're Dead
"Bubble Bath"	2024	—	—	—	—	—	—	—		Non-album singles
"Heaterz" (with Pozer)	2024	—	—	—	—	—	—	—		Non-album singles
"Crush" (featuring Jorja Smith)	2025	23	8	—	2	—	81	16	BPI: Silver	Don't Die Before You're Dead
"Friday Prayer" (featuring Headie One and Aitch)	2025	—	—	—	—	—	—	40		Don't Die Before You're Dead
"Paid in Full" (featuring Big Zuu, Wax, Ets and D7)	2025	—	—	—	—	—	—	—		Don't Die Before You're Dead
"3rd Time Lucky"	2025	—	—	—	—	—	—	—		Don't Die Before You're Dead
"West Life"	2025	—	—	—	—	—	—	—		Don't Die Before You're Dead
"Ibiza" (with Carns Hill featuring Blade Brown)	2026	—	—	—	50	—	—	27		Non-album singles
"Quaresma"	2026	—	—	—	—	—	—	—		Non-album singles
"Baja Blast"	2026	—	—	—	—	—	—	—		Non-album singles
"—" denotes a recording that did not chart or was not released in that territory.

=== As featured artist ===
Title	Year	Peak chart positions				Certifications	Album
Title	Year	UK	UK R&B	IRE	NL	Certifications	Album
"Popstar" (Nessly featuring AJ Tracey and blackbear)	2017	—	—	—	—		Non-album singles
"Apologies" (Sloan Evans featuring AJ Tracey and Swoosh)	2017	—	—	—	—		Non-album singles
"Have U Seen" (MISOGI featuring AJ Tracey)	2018	—	—	—	—		Non-album singles
"London's Calling" (GRM Daily featuring Skrapz, Avelino, Asco, Loski and AJ Tracey)	2018	—	—	—	—		Let’s Work (Vol. 1)
"Other Man" (D33J featuring AJ Tracey and Sloan Evans)	2018	—	—	—	—		Infinity 33
"Fashion Week" (Steel Banglez featuring AJ Tracey and MoStack)	2019	7	4	69	—	BPI: Platinum	Non-album single
"Choose Sides" (M.O featuring AJ Tracey)	2019	—	—	—	—		Modus Operandi
"Leave Dat Trap" (Unknown T featuring AJ Tracey)	2019	53	—	—	—		Rise Above Hate
"No Limits" (Big Zuu featuring D7 and AJ Tracey)	2019	—	—	—	—		Non-album singles
"We're Doin This" (Remtrex featuring AJ Tracey)	2019	—	—	—	—		Non-album singles
"Trendsetter" (Nyge featuring AJ Tracey and Kranium)	2019	—	—	—	—		Non-album singles
"Times Like These" (as part of Live Lounge Allstars)	2020	1	—	—	—	BPI: Silver	Non-album singles
"Ain't It Different" (Headie One featuring AJ Tracey and Stormzy)	2020	2	—	5	52	BPI: Platinum; ARIA: Platinum; RMNZ: Platinum	Edna
"Miss Me" (MoStack featuring AJ Tracey)	2020	39	—	67	—		Non-album singles
"One More Time" (Not3s featuring AJ Tracey)	2020	65	—	—	—		Non-album singles
"Provisional Licence" (M1llionz featuring AJ Tracey)	2021	—	24	—	—		Provisional Licence
"Make You Smile" (D-Block Europe featuring AJ Tracey)	2021	15	—	—	—	BPI: Platinum	Home Alone 2
"Showstopper" (Remix) (Nelly Furtado featuring AJ Tracey)	2024	—	—	—	—		Non-album single
"—" denotes a recording that did not chart or was not released in that territory.

=== Promotional singles ===
Title	Year	Album
"Curry Chips Freestyle" (as Looney)	2011	Non-album single
"Banger" (as Looney)	2011	Non-album single
"MegaTron" (as Looney)	2011	Non-album single
"Touch a Button" (as Looney)	2011	Non-album single
"Spring Freestyle" (as Looney)	2011	The Dungeon
"Crud Tip (Bricks Freestyle)" (as Looney)	2011	Didn't Make the Cut
"Catch 'Em '16" (as Looney)	2011	Didn't Make the Cut
"Skeng'd Out" (as Looney)	2011	The Dungeon
"Winter Freestyle" (as Looney)	2011	The Dungeon
"Lord of the Hypes" (as Looney)	2012	The Dungeon
"Afternoon in Madrid" (Looney featuring Rico, Sketch and Jay Amo)	2014	Slime City
"Kun Aguero"	2014	No More Looney
"Spirit Bomb"	2015	Alex Moran
"Chalk" (featuring Merky ACE)	2015	Alex Moran
"Trapsuit"	2015	AJ's Stocking Filler
"Naila"	2016	Alex Moran
"Final Flash"	2016	Non-album single
"Pasta"	2016	Lil Tracey
"Luke Cage"	2016	Lil Tracey
"Alakazam" (featuring Jme and Denzel Curry)	2017	Secure the Bag!

== Other charted songs ==
Title	Year	Peak chart positions				Certifications	Album
Title	Year	UK	UK R&B	UK Ind.	NZ Hot	Certifications	Album
"Tour Team" (featuring 67)	2017	—	—	16	—		Secure the Bag!
"Alakazam" (featuring JME & Denzel Curry)	2017	—	—	19	—		Secure the Bag!
"luvd u"	2017	—	—	25	—		Secure the Bag!
"Shisha"	2017	—	—	32	—		Secure the Bag!
"Bird Call"	2017	—	—	45	—		Secure the Bag!
"Wifey Riddim 3"	2019	46	26	8	—	BPI: Silver	AJ Tracey
"Nothing But Net" (with Giggs)	2019	99	28	10	—		AJ Tracey
"Country Star"	2019	—	29	11	—		AJ Tracey
"Plan B"	2019	—	—	13	—		AJ Tracey
"Double C's"	2019	—	—	15	—		AJ Tracey
"Rina"	2019	—	—	16	—		AJ Tracey
"Jackpot"	2019	—	—	20	—		AJ Tracey
"Triple S"	2019	—	—	26	—		AJ Tracey
"Prada Me"	2019	—	—	28	—		AJ Tracey
"Horror Flick"	2019	—	—	37	—		AJ Tracey
"Elastic"	2019	63	—	—	—		Top Boy – A Selection of Music Inspired by the Series
"Halloween" (featuring Young Adz)	2019	100	—	—	—		AJ Tracey (Deluxe)
"Kukoč" (featuring Nav)	2021	61	—	—	25		Flu Game
"—" denotes a recording that did not chart or was not released in that territory.

== Guest appearances ==
List of guest appearances, with other performing artists, showing year released and album name
Title	Year	Artist(s)	Album
"Clouded Skies"	2013	Big Zuu, Sketch, Riks, Jay Amo	My Team Paid
"It's Going Down"	2013	Santi	—N/a
"Everybody" (Remix)	2013	Devinkz, Enkay, Big Zuu	—N/a
"Stormy Days" (Remix)	2014	Santi	—N/a
"Man Wanna Talk"	2015	Capo Lee, Big Zuu	—N/a
"Ride Out"	2015	Big Zuu, Marger	Big Who?
"Owe You Nothing"	2015	GHSTLY XXVII, Lyrical Strally, Big Zuu	Recon
"Opp Anthem" (Remix)	2015	Jay Amo, Big Zuu, PK, Capo Lee	Ammi
"Tekkk Freestyle"	2015	Sir Spyro, JLSXND7RS	—N/a
"Hoe"	2015	AJ Tracey	Complex presents #GrimeTimeWarp Vol. 1
"Slap Yourself" (Remix)	2015	GHSTLY XXVII, Jammz	—N/a
"Bucktown"	2015	Kahn & Neek, P Money, Jammer, Rocks FOE, Saint P, Nico Lindsay	FabricLive.83
"West London"	2015	Teeza, Mez, Kyeza, Snowy, J Dot	FabricLive.83
"Kestra"	2015	DaVinChe, Jammz, Novelist, PK, Capo Lee	FabricLive.83
"War"	2016	Wax	—N/a
"Bowser"	2016	Filthy Gears, PK	Filthy Features
"10/10" (Remix)	2016	P Money, Blacks, Mez, Capo Lee, PK, SafOne, Coco, Jammz, Discarda	—N/a
"Str8 Riddim"	2016	AJ Tracey	Trapstar x Logan Sama Mixtape
"Like That"	2016	Reeko Squeeze	Str8 Authentic
"All Four Walls" (Zdot Remix)	2016	Gorgon City, Vaults	—N/a
"Leg Day" (Remix)	2016	Tinchy Stryder, Capo Lee, Frisco	—N/a
"Big n Serious" (Remix)	2016	Coco, Nadia Rose	—N/a
"Arrogant Stance (Eski Thug)"	2016	Darkness, YGG, Big Zuu, Darkos Strife, Kwam, Nico Lindsay, Elf Kid, Hilts, GHSTLY XXVII	—N/a
"London vs. Midlands Cypher"	2016	Eyez, Mez, Kamakaze, Dave, Jammz	Red Bull Studios presents Mind the Gap
"Ascend"	2016	Last Japan	—N/a
"Don't Talk Like That" (Remix)	2016	YGG, Spitz, Jay Amo, Big Zuu, Mic Ty	—N/a
"Rudeboy" (Remix)	2016	Fusion, PK	—N/a
"AJ Tracey Intro"	2016	Mez, DaVinChe	The M1 EP
"Shoulda Known Better"	2016	Mez, DaVinChe, Harvey	The M1 EP
"Oops" (Remix)	2016	Haile, Akelle Charles, Yung Fume, Tremz, Louis Rei	—N/a
"Thinking of You" (Cadenza Remix)	2016	Mabel	—N/a
"Domme Jongens" (Remix)	2016	Mula B & Louis	—N/a
"23"	2016	Reekz MB, Youngs Teflon	Right & Wrong
"Fighting"	2016	Maniac	BrOTHERHOOD (Original Soundtrack)
"Be Somebody" (Remix)	2016	Clams Casino, ASAP Rocky, Lil B	—N/a
"Knotty Head" (UK Remix)	2016	Denzel Curry, Rick Ross	—N/a
"My Ways"	2017	New Gen, J Warner	New Gen
"Wild Goat"	2017	Lancey Foux, Nyge, Kojey Radical, Jevon	First Day at Nursery
"None of That"	2017	Faze Miyake, Merky ACE	N.O.T. – EP
"REDMERCEDES" (Remix)	2017	Aminé, Missy Elliott	Non-album remix
"Look What I Did"	2017	Yung Fume	Noughts & Crosses 3
"Tell Man Twice"	2017	Big Zuu	Big Zuu – EP
"Bully"	2017	Sloan Evans	mia
"Don't Get Me Mad" (Remix)	2017	Fusion, Big Zuu	READY
"Somebody Like Me"	2018	Craig David	The Time Is Now
"A List"	2018	D7, Big Zuu	The Waiting Game – EP
"No Discussion"	2018	Smoke Dawg	Struggle Before Glory
"Trekked Like Me"	2018	Not3s	Take Not3s II
"Elastic"	2019	None	Top Boy – A Selection of Music Inspired by the Series
"Bankroll"	2019	Lil Mosey	Certified Hitmaker
"Tides"	2020	KSI, Rich the Kid	Dissimulation (Deluxe)
"Jimmy Jimmy"	2021	Gorillaz	Meanwhile EP
"FYN"	2022	Rema	Rave & Roses
"Why"	2022	Digga D	Noughty By Nature
"R Kid"	2022	Aitch	Close To Home

== Production credits ==
Title	Year	Artist(s)	Album	Produced with:
"LA4AWEEK"	2017	AJ Tracey, Swoosh, Sloan Evans	Non-album single	Nyge
"Tell Man Twice"	2017	Big Zuu, AJ Tracey	Big Zuu – EP	TBC
