= FabricLive.83 =

Compilation album by Logan Sama
- Released: 25 September 2015
- Genre: Grime
- Length: 1:10:14
- Label: Fabric

FabricLive chronology
FabricLive.82 (2015)	FabricLive.83 (2015)	FabricLive.84 (2015)

FabricLive.83 is a 2015 DJ mix album by English DJ Logan Sama. The album was released as part of the FabricLive Mix Series.

In a first for the series, FABRICLIVE 83 was also made available on vinyl. The vinyl pressing contains all 24 exclusive instrumentals created for the mix presented as a quadruple-disc LP. The CD edition features all 24 vocal versions, while the digital edition contained both versions of the release.

== Background and recording ==
Logan Sama spent a period of several months contacting grime producers asking them to create new instrumentals for the mix as well as contacting emcees collecting acapella bars. A mix was then created that stitched together instrumentals and accapellas in the style of a grime pirate radio set. The resulting mix featured 24 producers and 66 emcees from across the history of the genre.

== Track listing ==
No.	Title	Length
1.	"Wiley - Sweep The Floor" (featuring Wiley, P Money, Jendor & Despa)
2.	"Footsie - Brake Light" (featuring D Double E, Footsie, Chronik & Diesle D Power)
3.	"Rude Kid - Fabric" (featuring Rival, Ghetts, So Large & Rapid)
4.	"Faze Miyake - Rifts" (featuring Merky ACE, Shifman, MIK & TKO)
5.	"ZXPH XLLXS - XCXD BXMB" (featuring Ego, Cadell, Scrufizzer, Maxsta, Rocks FOE, Grim Sickers & Nasty Jack)
6.	"Jme - The Return" (featuring Manga, Frisco, Novelist, Jammer & Diesle D Power)
7.	"Swifta Beater - War Lord" (featuring P Money, Jendor, D Double E, Ghetts & Kano)
8.	"Sir Spyro - Farda" (featuring Footsie, Meridian Dan, Bossman Birdie, Milli Major & President T)
9.	"Dullahbeatz - Final Stage" (featuring Kano, Saf One, Mayhem, Deadly, PRessure, Bomma B, Tornado, Flowdan, Killa P, GodsGift, Cadell, Shifman & MIK)
10.	"Jammer - Waterden Road" (featuring Jammer, Discarda, Manga & Killa P)
11.	"Rapid - 3rd Eye" (featuring Roachee, Stamina, So Large, Rival & Maxsta)
12.	"Spooky - Cookie Monster" (featuring Scrufizzer, Blacks, Kozzie, Mez, Snowy & J Dot)
13.	"Terror Danjah & P Jam - Crud" (featuring Hitman Hyper, Jamakabi, Capo Lee & Jammz)
14.	"Kahn & Neek - Bucktown" (featuring P Money, Jammer, Rocks FOE, Saint, Nico Lindsay & AJ Tracey)
15.	"Jammz - Contender" (featuring Jammz, Row D, Capo Lee, Kwam, PK & Big Zuu)
16.	"Mystery - Launchpad" (featuring Saint, Hitman, Jaykae, Choppa, Grim Sickers, Merky ACE, Ego, Chronik & TKO)
17.	"Trends - Ambush" (featuring Jaykae, Bomma B, Tornado, Hitman, Trapz, Kwam & Spitz)
18.	"Teeza - West London" (featuring AJ Tracey, Mez, Kyeza, Snowy & J Dot)
19.	"Preditah - Crash Bandicoot" (featuring D Double E, Discarda, Footsie, PRessure, Deadly, Saf One & Mayhem)
20.	"Maniac - Do One You Mug" (featuring Scrufizzer, Maxsta, Rapid & GodsGift)
21.	"DaVinChe - Kestra" (featuring Jammz, Novelist, AJ Tracey, PK & Capo Lee)
22.	"Teddy Music - Swear Down" (featuring Bossman Birdie, Milli Major, Meridian Dan & President T)
23.	"The Heavytrackerz - Santa's Last Christmas" (featuring Discarda, Roachee, Stamina, MIK, Merky ACE, Shifman & Kozzie)
24.	"Masro - Constructive Mayhem" (featuring Diesle D Power, Novelist, PK, Kwam, Meridian Dan & President T)
