= Amplify Dot =

English rapper (born 1988)

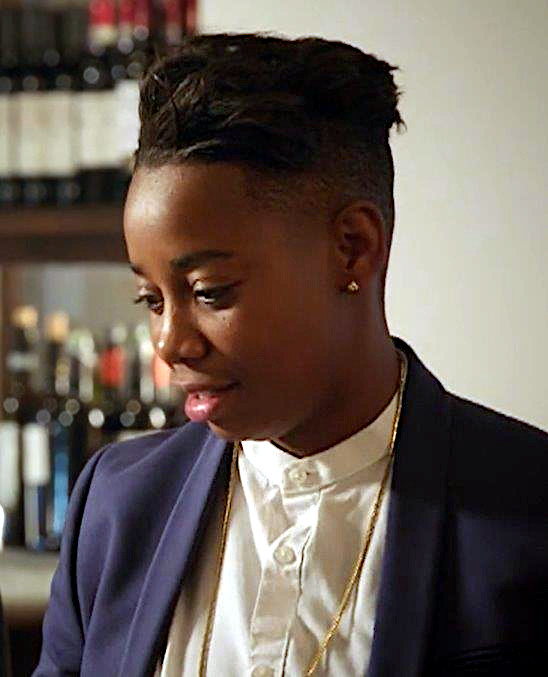
- Dotty in 2019
- Born: Ashley Charles; 9 April 1988 (age 38); South London, England
- Other names: A.Dot; Amplify Dot; Dotty
- Occupations: Rapper; disc jockey; broadcaster
- Employer: Apple Music
- Children: 2
- Musical career
- Genres: Grime; hip-hop
- Instrument: Vocals
- Years active: 2001–present
- Labels: Virgin; EMI
- Website: amplifydot.co.uk

Ashley Charles (born 9 April 1988), also known as A.Dot or Dotty, is an English rapper, DJ, and radio and television presenter. She is best-known for presenting on BBC Radio 1Xtra from 2014 to 2020 and co-presenting the BBC One show Sounds Like Friday Night alongside Greg James from 2017 to 2018.

She is the narrator for rapper 2 Chainz’s television show Most Expensivest.

== Early life ==
In 2001, at the age of thirteen, Amplify Dot performed a freestyle at a Missy Elliott concert at the Brixton Academy after Elliott asked if anyone in the audience could rap. She describes this as a defining moment that led her to pursue a career as a professional artist.

== Music career ==
Amplify Dot gradually built a reputation in the UK grime and hip hop scenes, featuring on the grime track "Game Over Female Takeover" (2010), and self-releasing the mixtape Born Ready (2011) and the EP Short Back and Sides (2012), which entered the iTunes Hip Hop Chart.

In June 2012, Amplify Dot signed a recording contract with Virgin Records and a publishing contract with Sony ATV, with Music Week reporting that she was the first female rapper in the UK to secure a major-label deal in over a decade. Soon after signing to Virgin, she released the Spare Parts mixtape, which she said contained tracks that were not going to make the cut for her debut album but that she was still keen for people to hear. This was followed in 2013 by the Spare Parts II mixtape hosted by UK radio personality Charlie Sloth.

Amplify Dot has collaborated with artists and producers including Busta Rhymes, Emeli Sandé, Zane Lowe, Krunchie, Show N Prove, Chris Loco, Fraser T. Smith, Midi Mafia, Beatfreakz, Kano, Gyptian, and Ms Dynamite. She has also performed with Lioness and Lady Leshurr as part of the all-female crew 367, including on a remix of the Ms Dynamite single "Neva Soft" (2011).

== Broadcasting career ==
=== Radio ===
In December 2013, she presented her own radio show as part of the Xtra Talent series on BBC Radio 1Xtra and was offered a regular presenting slot in 2014. She hosted Saturday's 4–7pm, weekends 1–4pm and weekday afternoons 1–4pm all before she replaced Twin B and Yasmin Evans as host of the weekday breakfast show in July 2016. On 2 July 2020, on the fourth anniversary of the Breakfast Show, Dotty announced that she will be leaving 1Xtra after six years. Her final show was on 30 July 2020.

Since March 2020, during the COVID-19 pandemic, Dotty has been making Too Rude for Radio - a podcast on BBC Sounds. The premise is that it allows her and her co-host to say things they can't say or do on the BBC Radio 1Xtra breakfast show. Therefore, it contains a lot of bad language and adult conversation. In the opening sequence, they "big up BBC Sounds for the freedom" from the BBC's usual rules. Her co-host is her producer Robby and they record the show from their respective homes, in Kingston upon Thames and Brixton to ensure they are socially distant.

In August 2020, Dotty announced that she is to become Apple Music's Lead Cultural Curator and Beats 1's radio presenter.

=== Television ===
In 2016, she presented A. Dot's Story of Grime, a documentary for BBC Three following her attempt to get the biggest names in grime to clash in a cypher called Grimeageddon, royal rumble style. First she attended the 2016 Red Bull Culture Clash, a sound clash competition featuring the biggest names in hip hop, dancehall, grime, and garage, to give a mainstream example of what she wants, but with less glitz and glam. She then goes back to grime clashing roots by meeting Lord of the Mics co-founders Ratty and Jammer at Jammer's childhood family home. She attended the 2016 Bestival festival. She interviewed Logan Sama, DJ Target, NoLay, Sian Anderson, Wiley, AJ Tracey, Jammz, Ghetts, President T, Sir Spyro, Chantelle Fiddy and GRM Daily founder Posty, to get their advice and opinions on what she's trying to do, plus get some of them involved. She goes to meet rapper Devilman in Birmingham, but he doesn't turn up. She interviews Bradfordians including videographer James Guy, producer Rubix Cube, rappers Blazer Boccle, Wrapz, and Mic Man Sparxxx, along with Huddersfield rapper Jahrel Mission, in Rubix's Thornton, Bradford based music studio. The Bradfordians give their views on rappers up North, clashing and grime in general. The Grimeageddon cypher involved the Wolverhampton rapper Raider, Kilburn rapper Big Zuu, along with cousins Shizz McNaughty and Discarda from Bow battling it out. Logan Sama deejayed for the cypher, while the West Yorkshire boys James, Rubix, Blazer, Wrapz, Mic Man, Jahrel, and D-Lo from Bradford watched on, before finally getting a go on the mic at the end.

In 2017, she co-presented Sounds Like Friday Night, a new primetime music show for BBC One with Greg James.

In 2018, she appeared on BBC Two's comedy game show I'll Get This. In the same year, she appeared in Rick Edwards' game show Impossible Celebrities.

== Other work ==
She also wrote her debut book Outraged: Why Everyone is Shouting and No-One is Talking. It was released on 9 July 2020 and was a Number 1 bestseller on The Times bestseller chart.

== Personal life ==
Dotty lives in Kingston upon Thames in south-west London with her two sons. She is an avid supporter of Manchester United F.C.

== Discography ==
- Born Ready (2011) Mixtape
- Short Back and Sides (2012) EP
- Spare Parts (2012) Mixtape
- Spare Parts II (2013) Mixtape

=== Singles ===
- "Get Down" (2012)
- "Kurt Cobain" (2013)
- "I'm Good" feat. Busta Rhymes (2013)
