= President T =

British grime MC (born 1983)

- Also known as: Pres T Prez T
- Born: Anthony George Harris; March 6, 1983 (age 43); Birmingham
- Origin: North London, England
- Genres: Grime; UK garage; drum and bass; jungle
- Occupations: Rapper
- Years active: 1996—present
- Label: Starworks Music

Anthony George Harris, better known by his stage name President T, is a British grime artist. President T was born in Birmingham, but moved to Tottenham, North London when he was 3 years old. He is known for his distinct style of delivery, offbeat rhyming patterns, and flow.

== Biography ==
President T started his music career as a drum and bass and jungle MC, later moving into UK garage when that began to emerge, and then grime. President T has credited pirate radio for allowing him to perfect his craft. President T has family in Manchester and spent some time there for three years in his teens. In the late 1990s, he joined Manchester-based group Darkside Crew alongside Black Tiga, Ms. Shotta, Vane, DJPH1, and Nova & Cautious.

In 2003, he joined younger brother Big H, cousin Bossman Birdie, as well as Skepta, Jme, Pablo, Meridian Dan, and Lieutenant to form Meridian Crew, all of whom were based around the same area in North London.

President T released his debut mixtape, Back Inna My Face Volume 1, in late 2007 for free download.

Meridian Crew would end up splitting up. Skepta and Jme went on to form Boy Better Know, while President T joined Bloodline Music alongside former Meridian Crew members; Big H, Pablo, Bossman Birdie and fellow North London MC 9 Milli Major.

President T had a lull of activity until a return in 2015, when he dropped a 13-track mixtape titled Greatest To Ever Touch Down. This was followed by T on The Wing in 2016, followed in 2017 by a re-master and re-release of his 2007 mixtape, Back Inna My Face. In 2018, President T dropped two projects, Stranger Returns and There's Only One.

In November 2016 he appeared in A. Dot's Story of Grime, a documentary for BBC Three. A.Dot wanted President T to be one of the veteran rappers in the grime clash cypher she was trying to set up, and Sir Spyro who was also in the same studio agreed he should accept the challenge. However he declined the offer, just like all the other grime music legends, as they didn't want to risk being the only veterans there.

In December 2016 he appeared in the two-part Channel 4 documentary Pirate Mentality, which was co-produced by Two Yanks and a Brit UK, Risky Roadz and SBTV. He was interviewed briefly in episode 1, along with a short clip of him performing in an old school pirate radio session, which was set up by Frisco and Risky Roadz. His full unedited performance was shown in episode 2.

== Radio studio appearances ==
- 13 June 2014 – BBC Radio 1 – Radio 1's Soundsystem with Toddla T: #ThatsNotMe Freestyle with Skepta, JME, D Double E, Tempz, Sox, Kruz Leone, Subzee and President T
- 29 April 2015 – BBC Radio 1Xtra – MistaJam: #SixtyMinutesLive with Bloodline (DJ Cable, Milli Major and Prez T)
- 19 September 2015 – BBC Radio 1Xtra – Charlie Sloth's SlothPod and 1Xtra Rap Show: Fire in the Booth with President T
- 7 October 2015 – BBC Radio 1Xtra – Sian Anderson: Sian's Studio with Prez T, the Manor and Nvoy
- 28 November 2015 – BBC Radio 1 – 1Xtra's Rap Show with Charlie Sloth: Fire in the Booth Cypher 2015 with Cadet, Lunar C, Lady Leshurr, SafOne, Bonkaz, Lady Lykez, Eyez, Hitman, J Spades and President T
- 23 December 2015 – BBC Radio 1Xtra – Logan Sama: Prez T
- 28 September 2016 – BBC Radio 1Xtra – Splurgeboys & P.A.P x President T x P Money takeover for Sian Anderson
- 21 December 2016 – BBC Radio 1Xtra – MistaJam: MistaJam's Christmas Party - Donae'o feat President T and Tinchy Stryder "Bro's Dem"
- 22 December 2016 – BBC Radio 1Xtra – Sian Anderson: Sian's Studio with Capo Lee, Nico Lindsay, Bossman Birdie and President T
- 24 December 2016 – BBC Asian Network – DJ Limelight & Kan D Man: Prez T
- 3 April 2017 – BBC Radio 1Xtra – DJ Target – Majestic & Friends Team Takeover with Majestic, DJ Luck & MC Neat, Wideboys, Nightcrawlers, Big H, Leanne Brown, MC DT, Ratpack, MC Kie, MC Credd, MC Bushkin, Milli Major, Bossman Birdie, and President T
- 11 October 2018 – BBC Radio 1Xtra – DJ Target – Snoochie Shy sits in for DJ Target with President T
- 12 October 2018 – BBC Radio 1Xtra – Sian Anderson – President T Soundclash
- 16 November 2018 – BBC Radio 1Xtra – Sir Spyro – Sir Spyro's 1Xtra Anniversary Set with President T, Mez, Halo, Jamakabi, Capo Lee, Sub Ten, Villain, Nico Lindsay, Double S, Melvillous and SafOne

== Discography ==
Albums/EP's/Mixtapes

- Back Inna My Face Volume 1 (2007)
- Greatest To Ever Touch Down (2015)
- T on The Wing (2016)
- Stranger Returns (2018)
- There's Only One (2018)
- Passing The Bill (2019)

Singles

- Meridian Dan feat Wiley and President T – So Much Cash (2014)
- Sir Spyro feat Big H, Bossman Birdie and President T – Side by Side (2015)
- Ghetts feat President T – Pick up the Phone (2018)
