= Sir Spyro =

English grime DJ/producer (born 1986)

- Also known as: DJ Spyro
- Born: Karl Joseph; 29 June 1986 (age 40)
- Origin: Manor Park and Stratford, London, England
- Genres: Grime; UK garage; UK funky; bassline; dubstep
- Occupations: Record producer; DJ; radio personality; label manager
- Labels: Pitch Controllers; Dragon Punch; Deep Medi Musik; Rinse; SighTracked; Neighbourhood Recordings; Tekkerz
- Member of: King Original Sound
- Formerly of: Kamikaze; Aftershock; Ruff Sqwad

Karl Joseph (born 29 June 1986), known professionally as Sir Spyro, is a British grime record producer, DJ, radio personality and label manager from East London. He was a Rinse FM resident for twelve years between 2005 and 2017, and since then has presented BBC Radio 1Xtra's Grime Show. He is a former member of grime crews Kamikaze, Aftershock and Ruff Sqwad, and has produced numerous hits including Stormzy's 2017 single "Big for Your Boots", which reached number six on the UK Singles Chart, and a remix of Ed Sheeran's 2019 single "Take Me Back to London" featuring Stormzy, Jaykae and Aitch, the release of which sent the song to number one in the UK.

== Early life ==
Joseph is the son of the Saint Lucian singer Nereus Joseph and is part-Jamaican; he is also the cousin of fellow grime producer D.O.K. He grew up in a musical household with "a mini studio in the corner" and songs from "Garnett Silk, Dennis Brown, Delroy Wilson, all flying out the speaker".

His older brothers and sisters were aspiring jungle DJs in the early 1990s, playing Goldie, Navigator and Shy FX; however, he claims his DJing career was self-taught through using turntables in his local youth club and "started off with me practising jungle when I was like eleven years old". He began collecting vinyl records aged about twelve and owned a pair of Technics SL-1200 turntables from the age of fourteen. He also began producing records at fourteen using FL Studio, and was "inspired by jungle, garage and the early grime sound". There was a room set up with a digital audio workstation in his local youth club on which he learnt to produce, although he decided at an early age to prioritise DJing and showcase the music of his contemporaries.

His stage name came from a friend likening him to the video game character Spyro after watching him struggle carrying a heavy record bag in his youth. He was inspired by DJ EZ and Shy FX and the early Rinse FM shows of Slimzee and Reckless Crew, and first gained an appreciation for grime music through listening to Nasty Crew's Mak 10. His productions were later influenced by early Skepta instrumentals.

== Musical style ==
Joseph's producer tag is a recording of himself saying "sounds of the Sir". Writing for Crack, Tomas Fraser noted in 2016 that his production style had shifted from "808-driven beats that used to cater for MCs" towards "darker, harder club sounds". Joseph has stated that there are "Caribbean elements" in his style due to his family background but he was also influenced by the sounds played by the friends he grew up with. He prefers to collaborate with vocalists in person to enable a more dynamic creative process.

== Career ==
=== 2000–2007: Pirate radio shows and Kamikaze crew ===
Joseph's first ever radio appearance was at the age of thirteen or fourteen, guesting on a friend's show on local pirate radio station Blaze FM 105.6 in Manor Park. He later had a show on another pirate station, Raw Mission. His first radio residency aired on Monday nights between 8 and 10pm, the same time slot as Nasty Crew's popular show on Deja Vu FM, although he has claimed the preconception that he would have fewer listeners made his first forays into live broadcasting less daunting. He became a resident DJ on Rinse FM in 2005 at the invitation of the station's co-founder, Geeneus. At the time, he was a member of the crew Kamikaze alongside Killa K, Offkey, Beastie, Skips, and B Marvel, and remixed fellow member Treble Clef's grime instrumental "Ghetto Kyote" in 2005. In 2005, he also produced songs for Nasty Crew, including the unreleased single "This Song" and at least one song for their label.

=== 2007–2011: Associations with Aftershock and Ruff Sqwad ===
Joseph later became a DJ for grime collective Aftershock, joining his cousin, D.O.K. During his time with the crew, he mixed Mz Bratt's 2007 mixtape Give It 2 Em Vol. 1, contributed the song "Spywinder" to the various artist 2007 EP Zumpi Central, and appeared on Tim Westwood's BBC Radio 1Xtra show in August 2008 for a guest mix. At the time, his refix of Rebound X's "Rhythm & Gash" was a popular choice in grime sets and would often earn the MCs vocalling it a "reload", where a song is rewound and recited in appreciation of a performance. The refix was used as the basis for Jme's "P", included on his July 2008 album Famous?.

In 2007, Joseph became the tour DJ for his childhood friend Tinchy Stryder during Stryder's commercial breakthrough, due to Ruff Sqwad members DJ Begg and Scholar both being unable to commit to all tour dates. In 2009 he took over Slimzee's slot on Rinse from 3-5pm on Sundays. He formally joined Ruff Sqwad in 2011.

=== 2011–2015: Pitch Controllers, Dragon Punch Records and Pure Grime compilations ===
In 2011, Joseph collaborated with D.O.K on the instrumental grime EP Dragon Punch. It was released via the label and collective Pitch Controllers, which he established alongside Vectra, Mak 10, JJ, Maximum, Sir C and Teddy Music—most of them fellow Rinse FM grime DJs—to "put on raves", "play ourselves" and champion "producers in the camp". Remixing Bok Bok's single "Silo Pass" for Night Slugs in 2012 motivated Joseph to refocus on his productions, after having prioritised DJing for a few years. The song coincided with an increased public interest in instrumental grime music on the nightclub circuit. He established a new label of his own, Dragon Punch Records, through which he released the May 2012 Round 1 EP, the December 2012 Footsie collaboration "Night Shift", and the April 2013 EP Sounds of the Sir, the latter of which included collaborations with Jme, Merky ACE and Prince Rapid among others. Between 2012 and 2014, he also curated and mixed multiple instalments of the Pure Grime compilation CD series for dance music brand Pure Music (part of New State Music). His 2014 compilation Pure Grime: The Very Best of Grime, which included a new version of his song "Pull It Up" featuring Jme and Ny, entered the UK Compilation Chart at number 38. To promote its release, he shared the previously unreleased song "Chung Li" for free download via Mixmag.

=== 2015–2017: Commercial breakthrough and chart success with Stormzy ===
Joseph's 2015 single "Side By Side", featuring Big H, Bossman Birdie and President T, and his 2016 single "Topper Top", featuring Teddy Bruckshot, Lady Chann and Killa P, reached a wider audience than his previous songs. The release of "Side By Side" was accompanied by a music video, and the song was rated 9/10 by Chantelle Fiddy in a review for Mixmag, while Complex UK later named it the sixteenth most "impactful" grime song of the 2010s. It was remixed by London trio YGG in 2016 as part of a various artist remix EP curated by DJ Amy Becker and released on vinyl. "Topper Top", also accompanied by a video, was released via the typically dubstep-oriented label Deep Medi Musik, which Joseph claimed was a "big deal" to him, after its founder Mala heard DJ duo Kahn & Neek play the song. Demand for the vinyl record resulted in the pre-sale website crashing and copies reportedly sold out within an hour. Other notable songs Joseph produced in 2016 included Stormzy's "Scary", which entered the UK Singles Chart at number 169, Ghetts' "You Dun Know Already", which was nominated for the MOBO Award for Best Song, Capo Lee's "Mud", which independently peaked at number 57 on the UK iTunes chart, and P Money's all-star "10/10" remix, featuring AJ Tracey, Jammz and PK among others. Joseph was nominated in both the Best DJ and Best Producer categories at the GRM Daily Rated Awards 2016.

In February 2017, Stormzy's "Big for Your Boots", which Joseph produced, was released as the lead single from his debut album Gang Signs & Prayer, peaking at number six on the UK chart. It was nominated for the 2017 MOBO Award for Best Song, and the album, which also included the charting Spyro productions "Mr Skeng" and "Return of the Rucksack", topped the UK Albums Chart. Joseph claimed at the time that he was working on a debut album, which he later elaborated would also be titled Sounds of the Sir and was slated for a late 2017 or early 2018 release. In March 2017, he released the six-song EP Stop Talk, a collaborative project with North London MC Capo Lee, via Sian Anderson's record label SighTracked. He produced AJ Tracey's July 2017 song "Blacked Out", which peaked at number fourteen on the UK Independent Singles Chart. It served as the lead single from his Secure the Bag! EP, which entered the UK Albums Chart at number thirteen. In August 2017, Joseph was invited to deliver a Red Bull Music Academy lecture about his craft at Bristol venue The Love Inn. In September, he was nominated for the Rated Award for Producer of the Year for the second consecutive year.

=== 2017–present: BBC Radio 1Xtra residency and Neighbourhood Recordings activities ===
On 10 November 2017, BBC Radio 1Xtra announced that Joseph would be replacing Logan Sama as the host of their weekly Grime Show, which at the time aired on Friday nights between 11pm and 1am. He had broadcast weekly on Rinse up until that point. The following month, he collaborated with Ghetts and Jaykae on a remix of London Grammar's "Hell to the Liars". 2018 saw him release a remix of Jorja Smith's single "The One". In August 2019, he shared a remix of the Ed Sheeran single "Take Me Back to London" featuring Stormzy, Jaykae and Aitch, the release of which sent the song to number one in the UK. He also produced the Stormzy single "Sounds of the Skeng", which reached number 20 in the UK; the Ghetts song "Listen", which appeared on the soundtrack to the Netflix reboot of Top Boy; and a remix of the Mahalia single "Do Not Disturb". In August 2020, he released the six-track instrumental EP Rude Sounds in collaboration with fellow producer Rude Kid. He was nominated in the Best Producer category at the 2020 MOBO Awards.

In 2021, Joseph established the independent label Tekkerz to self-release music and released its first EP, Tekkerz 001, before taking over room three at fabric in December of the same year with a label showcase. In February 2022 he released the single "WISH", featuring posthumous vocals from Teddy Bruckshot alongside Black Steve, Killa P and Flowdan, via Neighbourhood Recordings, an offshoot of the artist management agency that represents Joseph as well as Dave. In April 2023, he collaborated with Nasty Jack, Jammer and So Large on "Ease", a single from the Grime Originals compilation Grime Originals: The Album. In May 2023, he released the Have Manners EP as the second record on Tekkerz. Two months later, this was followed by the Tekkerz 003 EP, featuring the songs "Baraks", "Tekkers 3" and "Solder Wire". In September 2023, he released the single "Rambunctious" featuring Bling Dawg. That year, he also began performing as a part of King Original Sound, the sound system restarted by Footsie and Jah Model following the death of their father, Farda Woz.

In 2024, Joseph collaborated with D Double E on the single "Energy Gang", and again on their joint 2025 EP King of Reloads, which featured the single "G.I.B (Grime Is Back)". His 2025 single "Start & Stop", featuring Killa P, was nominated for the DJ Mag Best of British award for Best Track. In January 2026, Joseph collaborated with Scorcher and Giggs on the single "Ups", credited as a primary artist on the song. The following month, he returned to label Deep Medi Musik as part of their 20th anniversary celebrations with the four-track EP 2nd Sq. He marked the launch of the project with a takeover show on the public community radio station Kindred, joined by MCs including Manga Saint Hilare, Killa P and Capo Lee.

== Awards and nominations ==
| Award | Year | Nominee(s) | Category | Result | Ref. |
|---|---|---|---|---|---|
| MOBO Awards | 2016 | "You Dun Know Already" (with Ghetts) | Best Song | Nominated | |
| MOBO Awards | 2017 | "Big for Your Boots" (with Stormzy) | Best Song | Nominated | |
| MOBO Awards | 2020 | Himself | Best Producer | Nominated | |
| GRM Daily Rated Awards | 2016 | Himself | Best DJ | Nominated | |
| GRM Daily Rated Awards | 2016 | Himself | Best Producer | Nominated | |
| GRM Daily Rated Awards | 2017 | Himself | Producer of the Year | Nominated | |
| DJ Mag Best of British Awards | 2025 | "Start & Stop" (featuring Killa P) | Best Track | Nominated | |

== Discography ==
=== Extended plays ===
- The Dragon Punch EP (with D.O.K) (Pitch Controller Records, 2011)
- Round 1 (Dragon Punch Records, 2012)
- Sounds of the Sir (Dragon Punch Records, 2013)
- Stop Talk (with Capo Lee) (SighTracked, 2017)
- No Sleep (with K2 World) (Dragon Punch Records/Royal Blu Music, 2017)
- Rude Sounds (with Rude Kid) (Rude Sounds, 2020)
- Tekkerz 001 (Tekkerz, 2021)
- Have Manners (Tekkerz, 2023)
- Tekkerz 003 (Tekkerz, 2023)
- King of Reloads (with D Double E) (Bluku Music, 2025)
- 2nd Sq (Deep Medi Musik, 2026)

=== Singles ===
- "Night Shift" (featuring Footsie) (Dragon Punch Records, 2012)
- "Chung Li" (Mixmag free download, 2014)
- "Side By Side" (featuring Big H, Bossman Birdie and President T) (Dragon Punch Records, 2015)
- "Topper Top" (featuring Teddy Bruckshot, Lady Chann and Killa P) (Deep Medi Musik, 2016)
- "Mud" (with Capo Lee) (Rinse, 2016)
- "1 Bagga Chat" (with K2 World) (Dragon Punch Records/Royal Blu Music, 2017)
- "Premier League Champions Freestyle" (with Big Zuu) (Big Joints/MNRK, 2020)
- "Hurdy Gurdy" (with Big Narstie) (Dice Recordings, 2020)
- "WISH" (featuring Teddy Bruckshot, Black Steve, Killa P and Flowdan) (Neighbourhood Recordings, 2022)
- "Bout It X2" (with Bossman Birdie and So Large) (Clean Unlimited, 2023)
- "Ease" (with Nasty Jack, Jammer and So Large) (Grime Originals, 2023)
- "Rambunctious" (with Bling Dawg) (Neighbourhood Recordings, 2023)
- "Energy Gang" (with D Double E) (Bluku Music, 2024)
- "Over the Wall" (featuring Duppy) (self-released, 2024)
- "G.I.B (Grime Is Back)" (with D Double E) (Bluku Music, 2025)
- "8 Bar" (featuring Lioness, Capo Lee, Mayhem NODB, BXKS, Griminal, Narst, Mya Remi, Merky ACE, Novelist, PK and C4) (Neighbourhood Recordings, 2025)
- "Start & Stop" (featuring Killa P) (Neighbourhood Recordings, 2025)

=== Selected production credits ===
| Year | Artist | Song | Album | Co-producer(s) | Peak chart position | Certifications |
|---|---|---|---|---|---|---|
| 2008 | OGz | "We're OGz Part 2" | OG Season Vol. 1 | | — | Certifications |
| 2008 | Jme | "P" | Famous? | | — | |
| 2008 | Doller Da Dustman featuring Jonson and Revolver | "Crew's Firing" | Return of the Jedi and Grime's Son | | — | |
| 2008 | Doller Da Dustman | "Edmonton's Spine" | Return of the Jedi | | — | |
| 2008 | Doller Da Dustman | "Bear Face Bear Weight" | Return of the Jedi | | — | |
| 2008 | Doller Da Dustman | "Make Music" | Return of the Jedi | | — | |
| 2009 | Cel22 | "Things I Remember" | Slang with Grammar | | — | |
| 2010 | Gracious K | "Shuu Yur Mout" | Goodness Gracious Vol. 1 | | — | |
| 2010 | Bruza | "The Debate" | Tales of the Underdog | | — | |
| 2010 | Doller Da Dustman featuring Lauren Mason | "My Drive" | Set to Be King | D.O.K | — | |
| 2013 | Sox and Bugzy Malone | "Hotbox S02 E01" | Non-album single | | — | |
| 2013 | Raider featuring Movez | "Made It" | Work Harder Vol. 2 | | — | |
| 2014 | Fangol | "Silly In Ere" | Wake Up | | — | |
| 2014 | Kozzie | "When I'm Doing It" | Koz the Kid 2 | | — | |
| 2014 | D Double E | "Wolly" | Non-album single | Darkness | — | |
| 2014 | Ghetts featuring Mercston | "Spragga Benz" | Momentum 2 (The Return of Ghetto) | | — | |
| 2014 | Grim Sickers | "Black Bin Bag Him" | 100 Bags | | — | |
| 2014 | Ruger featuring Blacks, Little Dee and P Money | "Guns & Roses" | Rugers Way | | — | |
| 2015 | Footsie | "Everything's There" | Non-album single | | — | |
| 2015 | Shorty | "What's Going On" | Moesh Music | | — | |
| 2015 | D-Power Diesle featuring Roachee and So Large | "What Have You Done?" | Non-album single | | — | |
| 2015 | P Money featuring Newham Generals | "Sounds of the Sir" | Money Over Everyone 2 | Rebound X | — | |
| 2015 | Lil Nasty | "Regardless" | Non-album single | | — | |
| 2015 | Nasty Jack | "Wot Is It" | Non-album single | | — | |
| 2015 | Capo Lee | "Come Out the Way" | Non-album single | | — | |
| 2015 | Grim Sickers and Nasty Jack | "Jack Sickers 2" | All Black Forever | Gundam | — | |
| 2015 | Hitman Tiga | "Name On a Wall" | Non-album single | | — | |
| 2015 | P Money | "10/10" | Live & Direct | Rude Kid | — | |
| 2015 | Smack | "Nejlepší MC v Čechách" | Sick | | — | |
| 2016 | XP, Capo Lee, Blay Vision and Nico Lindsay | "I'm Cool" | Why Not? | | — | |
| 2016 | Ghetts | "You Dun Know Already" | Non-album single | | — | |
| 2016 | Tinchy Stryder featuring Roachee | "Sekky" | 360° / The Cloud 9 LP | Rude Kid | — | |
| 2016 | Capo Lee featuring D Double E | "Mud" | Non-album single | | — | |
| 2016 | Stormzy | "Scary" | Non-album single | | UK #169 | |
| 2016 | Nico Lindsay featuring Lyrical Strally and PK | "Sky" | Why Not? Part 2 | Splurt Diablo | — | |
| 2016 | YGG | "It Ain't a Game" | Why Not? Part 2 | | — | |
| 2017 | Stormzy | "Big for Your Boots" | Gang Signs & Prayer | Fraser T. Smith | UK #6: BPI: 2× Platinum; RMNZ: Gold | |
| 2017 | Stormzy | "Mr Skeng" | Gang Signs & Prayer | Fraser T. Smith | UK #29 | BPI: Silver |
| 2017 | Stormzy | "Return of the Rucksack" | Gang Signs & Prayer | Fraser T. Smith | UK #53 | |
| 2017 | AJ Tracey | "Blacked Out" | Secure the Bag! | | — | |
| 2017 | Big Zuu | "Builders" | Big Zuu | | — | |
| 2017 | Capo Lee | "Style & Swag" | Capo the Champ | | — | |
| 2017 | Faultsz featuring Streema | "Man Said" | Raw to the Core | Bok Bok | — | |
| 2018 | President T | "Top of My Spine" | Stranger Returns | Faze Miyake | — | |
| 2018 | Bugzy Malone | "Clash of the Titan" | Non-album single | | — | |
| 2018 | Mayhem NODB featuring Sox and Big Zuu | "Back of the Darnce" | Mr Hazeum | | — | |
| 2018 | Bugzy Malone featuring Maverick Sabre | "Separation" | B. Inspired | | — | |
| 2018 | D Double E | "Schoolin'" | Jackuum! | | — | |
| 2018 | D Double E | "Live Tonight" | Jackuum! | Diamondz | — | |
| 2018 | Ghetts featuring President T | "Pick Up the Phone" | Ghetto Gospel: The New Testament | | — | |
| 2018 | Ghetts featuring Chip | "Shellington Crescent" | Ghetto Gospel: The New Testament | | — | |
| 2018 | Ghetts | "OJ Simpson" | The Intent 2: The Come Up (Original Motion Picture Soundtrack) | | — | |
| 2018 | Capo Lee featuring Frisco and Shorty | "Sekky" | Non-album single | Rude Kid | — | |
| 2019 | Crafty 893 | "Wotless" | Not Bad and Smart Dumb | | — | |
| 2019 | Mez | "T Specialist" | Tyrone 2 | | — | |
| 2019 | Mez | "P&G" | Tyrone 2 | | — | |
| 2019 | Crafty 893, Taliifah and JoSoSick | "You" | Why Not? Part 3 | | — | |
| 2019 | Crafty 893, BXKS and Kamakaze | "It's a Ting" | Why Not? Part 3 | Jammz | — | |
| 2019 | Stormzy | "Sounds of the Skeng" | Heavy Is the Head (Japanese edition bonus track) | | UK #20 | |
| 2019 | Ghetts | "Listen" | Top Boy (A Selection of Music Inspired by the Series) | | — | |
| 2019 | Capo Lee | "Pray for Me" | Heart of a Champ | | — | |
| 2020 | Manga Saint Hilare | "Face Myself" | Make It Out Alive | | — | |
| 2020 | PK | "Boss" | King Yosho | | — | |
| 2020 | Frisco featuring Mez | "Big Bro" | The Familiar Stranger | Frisco | — | |
| 2021 | Ghetts featuring Aida Lae | "Good Hearts" | Conflict of Interest | | — | |
| 2021 | Big Zuu featuring D Double E | "Variation" | Navigate | | — | |
| 2021 | Meridian Dan featuring President T and Jme | "Teachers Pets" | Non-album single | | — | |
| 2021 | Kurupt FM | "Ooze Dat" | The Greatest Hits (Part 1) | | — | |
| 2021 | Big Zuu featuring Jme and Novelist | "Offline" | Navigate | | — | |
| 2022 | Renz | "Leng Dinners" | WhoopDiDiDooTape | Rude Kid | — | |
| 2022 | Footsie | "It's All Love" | Non-album single | | — | |
| 2023 | Footsie | "Charizard Freestyle" | Non-album single | | — | |
| 2023 | P Money featuring AJ Tracey | "Them Guys" | Money Over Everyone 4 | Swifta Beater | — | |
| 2024 | Tina Tammi | "Typa Tug" | Non-album single | | — | |
| 2024 | C4 | "Try Me" | Between the Lines | | — | |
| 2024 | Jammz | "Picture This" | No Remorse | Jammz | — | |
| 2024 | Jammz | "Them Days" | No Remorse | | — | |
| 2024 | Mez | "Sonny Liston" | Me Alone and God EP | | — | |
| 2025 | Chip | "Ask Her" | Grime Scene Saviour | | — | |
| 2026 | Scorcher featuring Giggs | "Ups" | A.D.M.D. | | — | |
| 2026 | N3 | "Badman" | 2000 Hours | | — | |

=== Remixes ===
| Year | Artist | Song |
|---|---|---|
| 2005 | Treble Clef (as Kamikaze) | "Ghetto Kyote" |
| 2012 | Bok Bok | "Silo Pass" |
| 2012 | Doller | "Zoop Zoop" |
| 2014 | Rebound X | "Rhythm & Gash" |
| 2015 | Tinchy Stryder featuring Fuse ODG | "Imperfection" (with Ghetts and Frisco) |
| 2015 | Rude Kid | "Voices" |
| 2016 | Craig David | "One More Time" (with Ghetts and Frisco) |
| 2017 | Avelino featuring Stormzy and Skepta | "Energy" |
| 2017 | Plan B | "Heartbeat" |
| 2017 | London Grammar | "Hell to the Liars" (with Ghetts and Jaykae) |
| 2018 | Trends & Boylan | "Norman Bates" |
| 2018 | Jorja Smith | "The One" |
| 2019 | Ed Sheeran featuring Stormzy | "Take Me Back to London" (with Jaykae and Aitch) |
| 2019 | Mahalia | "Do Not Disturb" |
| 2019 | M.O | "Choose Sides" (with Big Zuu) |
| 2020 | Jon E Cash | "Hoods Up" |
| 2025 | Shy FX and KINGH | "Nobu" (with Capo Lee) |
