= Lord of the Mics =

Recorded grime clashes series

- Industry: Clashing
- Genre: Grime
- Founded: 2004
- Founders: Jammer, Chad 'Ratty' Stennett
- Headquarters: United Kingdom
- Website: lordofthemics.com

Lord of the Mics (also known as LOTM) is a series of recorded grime clashes, headed by Jammer and Chad 'Ratty' Stennett. Each edition of LOTM features grime MCs participating in recorded clashes, in which they 'battle' each other over grime instrumentals. Various notable grime MCs have participated in Lord of the Mics, such as Skepta, Wiley, Kano, and P Money. LOTM was originally launched in 2004. The first clash to be filmed for LOTM, Wiley versus Kano, was filmed in Jammer's basement. The series was originally only published on DVD. LOTM was the first platform that released filmed grime clashes.

Clashing is considered to be an important aspect of grime music due to the influence of Jamaican sound clashing. Jammer also credited Smack DVD, an American hip-hop series, as an influence, since it made Jammer realise there was no way for the public to physically see grime MCs.

== Format ==
The series features various clashes between two MCs over grime instrumentals. The two MCs go back-to-back over three grime instrumentals (one instrumental for each round). Alongside the release of the LOTM clashes, a compilation album of new grime songs is also released.

Prior to the publishing of the clashes, "Hype Sessions" are released. Each artist participating in the clashes releases a "Hype Session", a diss track aimed at their opponent.

Whoever won the clashes is left up to the listener to decide. During the clash between Ghetts and Napper on LOTM I, listeners were able to text a number to declare who they thought won, but the result was never officially released.

Clashes are held in private instead of with a live audience. The only exception is LOTM VI, which was a live event open to the public.

== History ==
LOTMs I and II were re-released on double-disc DVD in 2015.

=== Lord of the Mics I ===
Prior to LOTM, Capo and Chad 'Ratty' Stennett had filmed Lord of the Decks, a DVD released in 2003. The DVD featured music performances and interviews with various grime artists. It was also accompanied with a mixtape CD of over 22 songs. Jammer was friends with both Capo and Ratty, who were responsible for Hothead Productions through which they helped distribute instrumentals Jammer released. This experience and infrastructure was later used to create LOTM. DVDs were the first platforms available for fans to see what the MCs actually looked like, since before they could only hear their voices on radio or CDs. Jammer noted that Smack DVD, an American hip hop series, helped him realise that grime didn't have any platforms where you could actually see artists.

The first LOTM was released in 2004. Jammer was at his house with his friends. Jammer and one of his friends were having a playful argument. Jammer often had a camera around him, and so asked another friend who was there to film them arguing. Jammer later rewatched the video, and came up with the idea of two MCs clashing with each other on camera. Later in the day, he asked Kano if he had ever thought of having a clash with Wiley. At the time, Kano was an upcoming grime MC, while Wiley was a well-established artist within the scene. Jammer encouraged Kano to clash with Wiley. The next day, Wiley called Jammer, and during the call Jammer asked Wiley to come to the house. When he arrived, Jammer asked him if he would be willing to clash Kano. Wiley accepted, and then went down into Jammer's basement, later a hallmark of the Lord of the Mics brand, to film the clash between the two artists.

At the time, there was no specific idea to create a DVD and series. Jammer rewatched the clash between Wiley and Kano and thought it'd be a good idea to get more MCs to clash. Following this, Jammer organised a clash between Slix, a member of Ruff Sqwad, and Domino. Wiley then organised a clash between Scratchy, a member of Wiley's crew Roll Deep, and Footsie, a member of the N.A.S.T.Y. Crew. Following these recorded clashes, a clash between Ghetts (then known as Ghetto) and Napper was organised on radio.

Jammer later credited Wiley and Kano's record label signings, which followed the release of the DVD, at least partially to the success of LOTM and their clash. When Kano appeared on GMTV, a British breakfast-time television program, viewers called in to ask about his clash with Wiley. Jammer explained that this attention they received made it easy to organise a second edition of the DVD.

Other clashes on LOTM I included SLK vs Younger Nasty, Kal Serious vs Corey Johnson, and Bruza vs Crazy Titch.

=== Lord of the Mics II ===
LOTM II was released in 2006. Ratty and Jammer explained that it took two years since LOTM I for another LOTM was due to them both working on other things, such as Jammer's Are You Dumb? CD. Ratty also noted that grime had begun to commercialise, and that the rise of YouTube had a major effect on grime DVDs such as LOTM. The loss of vinyl and independent record stores also hampered the continuation of LOTM.

It just wasn't about when we released LOTM I, so it affected everything because people wanted everything for free. I didn't move with the times and there was no way of selling it digitally then.

LOTM II featured a clash between then-upcoming MC Skepta and Birmingham-based MC Devilman. Skepta personally suggested a clash between him and Devilman due to how competitive it would be. The clash was one of the most pivotal moments of Skepta's career and helped propel his popularity.

The other clashes included Bashy vs Demon, Tinchy Stryder vs Ears, Frisco vs Double O, Craze 24 vs Ill Millz, Big Narstie vs Scorcher, Snakeyman vs Al Blaze, Rage vs Fuda Guy, South Side Soldiers vs YGC.

=== Lord of the Mics III ===
LOTM III was released in 2011. Jammer had wanted to do it a year earlier, but a lack of new, young talent or eager people wanting to participate postponed it. It was originally planned for OG Niki to clash with NoLay, and for P Money to clash with Ghetts, but neither clash ended up working out. Jammer credited LOTM III for boosting Kozzie's career. Both the LOTM III DVD and CD charted.

Wiley was inspired by LOTM III to restart Eskimo Dance, a grime rave that was popular during the 2000s but had been discontinued. He held a new Eskimo Dance rave the following year which sold out tickets.

The third edition of LOTM received some criticism for not holding up to previous LOTMs.

Also in 2011, record label Absolute became responsible for publishing the Lord of the Mics compilation albums that are released alongside the clashes.

LOTM III featured the following clashes:

- Marger vs Lay-Z
- Jammin vs Clipson
- Tez Kidd vs Hypes
- Rival vs Desperado
- D Power vs Warriko
- J1 vs Merky Ace
- Tre Mission vs Jendor
- Sox vs Kozzie

=== Lord of the Mics IV ===
LOTM IV was released in 2012. The fourth edition featured the following clashes:

- Fangol vs Blay
- Jaykae vs Discarda
- K Dot vs Depz
- Koder vs Gritz
- M.I.K vs Pressure
- LK (also known as Lady Killer) vs Lady Shocker
- Hecki vs Drifter

Jaykae later credited LOTM for helping his rise in popularity.

=== Lord of the Mics V ===
LOTM V was released in 2013. LOTM V featured the following clashes:

- Maxsta vs Lil Nasty
- Big Shizz vs Blizzard
- D2 vs Eyez
- Lil Choppa vs Zeo
- Proton vs Realz
- Grimmy vs Grim Sickerz

=== Lord of the Mics VI ===
LOTM VI was released in 2014. Unlike previous LOTMs, three clashes in LOTM VI were filmed with a live audience. There were 150 tickets available to view LOTM live, which were priced at £100. Some controversy was generated over the price of the tickets. As with other LOTMs, a grime album was also released to accompany the clashes.

The live event featured three clashes:

- P Money vs Big H
- Opium vs Dialect
- Dorris vs Hazman

The DVD also featured additional clashes:

- AK vs Villain
- Local vs Jay Eyes
- Yannick Bolasie vs Bradley Wright-Phillips

The P Money vs Big H clash came to an abrupt end when Big H left the stage during the third (and last) round. During the second round, Big H had asked the DJ to rewind the instrumental. When that failed, he asked to skip to the third round. He had asked Jammer for more money if he was to continue, which Jammer declined. On behalf of Big H, Inside Music claimed the live audience making noise made things "difficult" for both sides. Later, Jammer and P Money gave a public statement saying Big H had "disrespectful" behaviour and said the statements Inside Music and Big H made were misleading.

=== Lord of the Mics VII ===
LOTM VII was released in 2015. It featured ten clashes:

- Kozzie vs Jaykae
- Lady Lykez vs Sox
- Mez vs Trappy
- Row D vs XP
- Bigz Man vs Xtra
- Blessed vs Pawz
- Blacks vs Face

Prior to the release of LOTM VII, a special '10 Years of Lord of the Mics' event was held. Jaykae and Kozzie, Mez and Trappy, Lady Lykez and Sox, and Row D and XP all clashed at the 10th anniversary as well as on the LOTM VII DVD. The event also saw a producer clash between Splurge Boys and Heavytrackerz, and a DJ clash between Dub Plate Mex and Big Mikee.

The 'Lord of the Mics' compilation album released alongside the clashes charted in the Top 10 of the UK Compilation Chart.

=== Lord of the Mics VIII ===
LOTM VIII was released in 2019. It featured nine clashes with a total of 18 MCs:

- Tommy B vs JAY0117
- Ten Dixon vs Tana
- Rawza vs Gen
- Logan vs Armz
- T Roadz vs SBK
- Yizzy vs Micofcourse
- Jafro vs Dialect
- Reece West vs F.O.S
- Funky Dee vs Mischief

Jammer originally stated that there would be thirty MCs in LOTM VIII. The eight addition was filmed by Jammer and Neron.

Prior to the release of LOTM, a set of live clashes were held at Rough Trade East. A regional tour was also held to promote LOTM.

The compilation album released alongside the clashes peaked at number 8 on the iTunes UK Albums Charts.

=== Lord of the Mics IX ===
In an interview in 2022, Jammer stated "Lord of the Mics 9 has been shot already but my business partner, Ratty, didn’t want to release LOTM9 and he wanted to shoot it again". Some footage from the ninth edition of Lord of the Mics was released on YouTube in October 2020, featuring a clash between Skinner and CY.

In lieu of the release of LOTM IX, Jammer and Neron worked on producing Top Producer, a series inspired by Lord of the Mics that pitted music producers against one another in a series of challenges.

== See also ==
- Don't Flop
