= YGG =

YGG may refer to:

- Ganges Water Aerodrome, IATA code
- Yo Gabba Gabba!, an American-Canadian live action/puppet children's television show
- YGG (group), a trio of English grime MCs
- Ygg, a name for the Norse god Odin
- Yggdrazil Group (trading symbol YGG), a Thai visual effects company
- YggTorrent, torrent website
