= Juscemar Borilli =

Brazilian footballer (born 1990)

Personal information
- Full name: Juscemar Braulio Borilli
- Date of birth: 12 January 1990 (age 36)
- Place of birth: Tapejara, Rio Grande do Sul, Brazil
- Height: 1.75 m (5 ft 9 in)
- Position: Midfielder

Youth career
- 2006–2007: Inter Milan
- 2007: Ajax

Senior career*
Years	Team	Apps	(Gls)
2007–2008	PEC Zwolle	4	(1)
2008–2009	Cremonese	0	(0)
2009–2010	Pizzighettone		
2011–2012	Crema		
2012–2013	Monza		
2014–2016	Seregno		
- * Club domestic league appearances and goals

Juscemar Braulio Borilli (born 12 January 1990) is a Brazilian former footballer who played as a midfielder.

== Early life ==
Born in Tapejara in the Brazilian state of Rio Grande do Sul, Borilli took an interest in football at a young age, playing futsal in Teixeira de Freitas, Bahia. At the age of thirteen, he moved to Vitória, Espírito Santo to live with his sister, and underwent an ultimately unsuccessful trial with a first division Brazilian team.

== Career ==
=== Joga Bonito and early career ===
Having returned to Bahia, Borilli learned of an upcoming reality television show named Joga Bonito, in which a number of young footballers would compete to win a short-term training contract at Corinthians, with the potential to trial with Italian sides Juventus and Inter Milan. Borilli was one of 4,340 teenagers to enter the competition, and went on to finish in first place. However, instead of attending his trial with Corinthians, Borilli went straight to Italy, in part due to his Italian heritage, and began training with Inter Milan.

Initially due to spend fifteen days in Milan, Borilli was asked to extend the deal, and ended up staying almost a year with the Serie A side. Following this experience, he was offered a contract with Dutch side AFC Ajax, but was unable to sign professionally due to issues with his Italian citizenship, and would only spend five months with the club.

=== Professional career ===
In June 2007, having initially spent time on trial, Borilli joined Eerste Divisie side PEC Zwolle. His time in Zwolle was plagued by injuries, and he would score one goal in a total of four games before being released in March 2008. He returned to Italy, joining Lega Pro Prima Divisione side Cremonese, but would fail to make an appearance for the club. He spent the rest of his career in the lower divisions of Italian football, before retiring in 2016 and returning to Brazil, where he became head coach of a football school.

== Career statistics ==
=== Club ===
Appearances and goals by club, season and competition
Club	Season	League			Cup		Other		Total	
Club	Season	Division	Apps	Goals	Apps	Goals	Apps	Goals	Apps	Goals
PEC Zwolle	2007–08	Eerste Divisie	4	1	0	0	0	0	4	1
Cremonese	2008–09	Lega Pro Prima Divisione	0	0	0	0	0	0	0	0
Career total			4	1	0	0	0	0	4	1
