= Conflict of Interest (album) =

Studio album by Ghetts
- Released: 19 February 2021
- Length: 70:57
- Label: Warner
- Producer: BLK VNYL; Reiss Nicholas; Rude Kid; Sir Spyro; Smasher; TJ Amadi; Ten Billion Dreams

Ghetts chronology
Ghetto Gospel: The New Testament (2018)	Conflict of Interest (2021)	On Purpose, with Purpose (2024)

Singles from Conflict of Interest
- 1. "Mozambique" Released: 7 July 2020; 2. "IC3" Released: 7 October 2020; 3. "Proud Family" Released: 16 December 2020; 4. "Skengman" Released: 15 January 2021; 5. "No Mercy" Released: 3 February 2021

Conflict of Interest is the third studio album by British rapper Ghetts, released on 19 February 2021 by Warner Records. It includes guest appearances from Skepta, Dave, Wretch 32, Giggs, Stormzy, Ed Sheeran, Emeli Sandé, and more.

== Release and promotion ==
Ghetts announced Conflict of Interest on 28 January 2021, alongside its cover artwork, tracklist, and release date. Five singles were released prior to the album: "Mozambique" (featuring Jaykae and Moonchild Sanelly), "IC3" (featuring Skepta), "Proud Family", "Skengman" (featuring Stormzy), and "No Mercy" (featuring BackRoad Gee and Pa Salieu). The two-part documentary, titled The Evolution of Ghetts, was released on YouTube.

== Critical reception ==
Professional ratings
Aggregate scores
Source	Rating
Metacritic	95/100
Review scores
Source	Rating
Clash	8/10
Evening Standard	4/5 stars
The Guardian	4/5 stars
The Line of Best Fit	9/10
NME	5/5 stars

At Metacritic, which assigns a normalised rating out of 100 based on reviews from mainstream critics, Conflict of Interest received a score of 95 out of 100, based on reviews from 7 critics. In a five-star review, Kyann-Sian Williams of NME concluded Conflict of Interest is Ghetts' "most earnest record to date", adding that "The rapper's third studio record and first on a major label, showcasing his growth over nearly two decades in the game, proves lyricism is in rude health." Alexis Petridis of The Guardian praised the album's production, stating: "The arrangements are beautifully done, subtle rather than showy, a key factor in establishing the album's overwhelming mood." Petridis concluded that "Conflict of Interest feels like the work of an artist who's in it for the long haul rather than short-term rewards."

== Track listing ==
Conflict of Interest track listing
No.	Title	Writer(s)	Producer(s)	Length
1.	"Fine Wine"	Justin Clarke; Rio Willis; TJ Amadi	TJ Amadi	4:56
2.	"Mozambique" (featuring Jaykae and Moonchild Sanelly)	Clarke; Janum Khan; Seneziwe Sanelly; Shezhed Zar	Rude Kid	4:50
3.	"Fire and Brimstone"	Clarke; Willis; Amadi; Dylan Mills	Ten Billion Dreams	3:11
4.	"Hop Out"	Clarke; Willis; Jakaan Pusey	Ten Billion Dreams	2:59
5.	"IC3" (featuring Skepta)	Clarke; Willis; Amadi; Joseph Adenuga	Ten Billion Dreams	3:48
6.	"Autobiography"	Clarke; Willis; Amadi; Kadeem Clarke	Ten Billion Dreams	6:50
7.	"Good Hearts" (featuring Aida Lae)	Clarke; Karl Joseph; Aida Lee	Sir Spyro	3:10
8.	"Dead to Me"	J. Clarke; Amadi; K. Clarke; Reiss Nicholas	Reiss Nicholas; TJ Amadi	3:49
9.	"10,000 Tears" (featuring Ed Sheeran)	J. Clarke; Amadi; K. Clarke; Kingdoms; Ed Sheeran	Reiss Nicholas	4:34
10.	"Sonya" (featuring Emeli Sandé)	J. Clarke; Nicholas; Amadi; K. Clarke; Adele Sandé	BLK VYNL; Reiss Nicholas; TJ Amadi	4:38
11.	"Proud Family"	Clarke; Amadi; Willis; Cedric Hailey; Donald DeGrate Jr.; Ian Opuku	Ten Billion Dreams; TJ Amadi	5:27
12.	"Skengman" (featuring Stormzy)	Clarke; Amadi; Willis; Michael Omari	Ten Billion Dreams	4:32
13.	"No Mercy" (featuring Pa Salieu and BackRoad Gee)	Clarke; Amadi; Willis; Pa Salieu Gaye; Shandy Bombusa	Ten Billion Dreams	3:26
14.	"Crud" (featuring Giggs)	Clarke; Willis; Amadi; Nathaniel Thompson	Ten Billion Dreams	5:32
15.	"Squeeze" (featuring Miraa May)	Clarke; Amadi; Jeffrey Russell; Miraa May	Smasher; TJ Amadi	2:42
16.	"Little Bo Peep" (featuring Dave, Hamzaa, and Wretch 32)	J. Clarke; Amadi; K. Clarke; Malika Hamzaa; David Omoregie; Jermaine Scott	BLK VNYL	6:33
Total length:				70:57

Notes

- "Fire and Brimstone" features additional vocals by Dizzee Rascal.
- "Proud Family" features additional vocals by Zahrah Anderson.

== Personnel ==
Performers

- Ghetts – primary artist (all tracks)
- Jaykae – featured artist (track 2)
- Moonchild Sanelly – featured artist (track 2)
- Skepta – featured artist (track 5)
- Aida Lae – featured artist (track 7)
- Ed Sheeran – featured artist (track 9)
- Emeli Sandé – featured artist (track 10)
- Stormzy – featured artist (track 12)
- BackRoad Gee – featured artist (track 13)
- Pa Salieu – featured artist (track 13)
- Giggs – featured artist (track 14)
- Miraa May – featured artist (track 15)
- Dave – featured artist (track 16)
- Hamzaa – featured artist (track 16)
- Wretch 32 – featured artist (track 16)

Technical

- TJ Amadi – executive producer, production
- Shezhed Zar – programming
- Wez Clarke – mixing
- Joe LaPorta – mixing, mastering
- Ian Opuku – piano
- Rio Willis – programming
- Swindle – string recording engineer, horns engineer
- Neil Waters – string arranger
- Kadeem Clarke – guitar
- Joe Hirst – mixing
- Ten Billion Dreams – production, additional mixing

== Charts ==
Chart performance for Conflict of Interest
Chart (2021)	Peak position
UK Albums (OCC)	2
UK R&B Albums (OCC)	1
