= Ghostly (musician) =

GHSTLY XXVII
- Also known as: Ghostly; GHS
- Born: Cadell Ramsey-Officer; 27 March 1997 (age 29)
- Origin: Acton, West London, England
- Genre: Grime
- Occupations: MC; producer; songwriter
- Years active: 2010–present
- Labels: Duppi Records; SpentShell

Cadell Ramsey (born 27 March 1997), better known by his stage name GHSTLY XXVII and formerly as Ghostly, is an English grime MC and producer from Acton, West London. He has appeared on BBC Radio 1Xtra, as well as pirate radio stations such as Deja Vu FM, Mode FM and Rinse FM.

== Career ==
In 2012, Ghostly appeared on SBTV along with Novelist, Koder and Tempo for a cypher at just age 15 and began to accumulate an interest around his name in the grime scene. 2013 Ghostly started going back and forth with Elf Kid from The Square sending war dubs due to altercations about a clash that was supposed to take place. At 17 years old, the young MC then went on to clash the entire Square Crew on Flex FM, a pirate / online radio station based in South London. In 2014, Ghostly was extremely active on the pirate radio scene amongst others and was part of a new breed of MCs bringing back that raw grime energy on the airwaves that were somewhat abandoned as well as gaining further exposure on major radio stations by appearing on Rinse FM, BBC 1xtra and more very frequently. 2015 was the year the explosive tracks "Slap Yourself" and "DALYDK" both premiered by DJ Cable's "Sixty Minutes" mix, which was broadcast on MistaJam's BBC 1Xtra taken from his debut Recon EP released via Complex Magazine on 10 August. Since the beginning of 2015, Ghostly has been extremely active on the pirate radio circuit as well as performing his underground music all over the UK in raves and festivals. He is now also a producer and record label owner at Duppi.

In March 2017, he released a four-track EP entitled Guerrilla Tactics through Flowdan's SpentShell label. The project features guest vocals from PK and Riko Dan as well as productions from AudioSlugs, J Beatz and Kid D.

GHS (formerly GHSTLY XXVII) is a UK grime and bass artist. His releases include “3310”, “What’s Good,” and “Business".

GHS’s talent and potential have not gone unnoticed. He has featured on radio stations like Rinse FM, with support from influential figures such as Sir Spyro, and BBC 1Xtra. His frequent collaborations with UK legend and Grammy-award winner Flowdan, including several releases on Flowdan’s Spentshell label in 2018, further highlight his credibility and influence in the scene.

One of GHS’s major milestones was the release of the underground dance floor anthem “Doing it Major” with Kobe JT in 2021, which achieved global success, amassing over 1 million Spotify streams. The track gained further recognition by being featured in the Netflix series “Everything Now” (Episode 1) in 2023, a success GHS celebrated with his fans on social media.

In 2021, GHS produced “Trust” from his Rudeboy Paradise album, which gained widespread attention after being featured in the NBA 2K21 game.

His influence extended into acting in 2023 when he made his debut in the BBC series “Grime Kids” adapted from DJ Target's book appearing in Episode 1.

In 2024, His track “Business,” also from the Rudeboy Paradise album, was featured in the Netflix series “Supacell” (Episode 3 'Sabrina') in 2024 solidifying his presence in both music and television.

The summer of 2024 has been a landmark season for GHS, with several new music videos, a performance at Outlook Festival in Croatia, and an upcoming set at Get On Festival in the UK. GHS has also announced that he is working on a new album, which is highly anticipated by fans and industry insiders alike.

Given the quality of his early work and the growing interest in his music, GHS is poised to make a significant impact in the coming years. His continued evolution and experimentation with sound suggest he is set to become a key player in the ongoing evolution of UK music.

== Discography ==
=== EPs ===
Title	Details
Recon	Released: August 2015; Formats: Digital download
O	Released: August 2016; Formats: Digital download
Guerrilla Tactics	Released: 16 March 2018; Formats: Digital download

=== Singles ===
Title	Details
"In Ere'" (DJ Cable featuring Ghostly)	Released: 19 February 2016; Label: Triangulum; Formats: Digital download
"3310"	Released: 3 September 2016; Label: Duppi; Formats: Digital download
