= Scary (song) =

Single by Stormzy
- Released: 2 September 2016
- Genre: Grime
- Length: 3:44
- Label: Self-released
- Songwriter: Stormzy
- Producer: Sir Spyro

Stormzy singles chronology
"Aldrig Igen (må sådär)" (2016)	"Scary" (2016)	"Big for Your Boots" (2017)

Music video
- "Scary" on YouTube

"Scary" is a song by English rapper Stormzy. It was released as a single independently on 2 September 2016. The song peaked at number 169 on the UK Singles Chart.

== Background ==
In the lyrics of "Scary", Stormzy disses an unnamed rival. The song, like "Shut Up", "One Take Freestyle" and others in his catalogue, is widely perceived to be directed at Cadell, a grime artist and the younger half-brother of Wiley, who had repeatedly called out Stormzy by name on songs from 2015 onwards. Cadell responded over the same instrumental on the song "Scarier".

== Music video ==
A music video to accompany the release of "Scary" was first released onto YouTube on 25 April 2016.

== Charts ==
Chart (2016)	Peak position
UK Singles Downloads (OCC)	65
UK Indie (OCC)	17
UK Hip Hop/R&B (OCC)	33
UK Singles (Official Charts Company)	169

== Certifications ==
Region	Certification	Certified units/sales
United Kingdom (BPI)	Silver	200,000^{‡}
^{‡} Sales+streaming figures based on certification alone.

== Release history ==
Region	Date	Format	Label
United Kingdom	2 September 2016	Digital download	Self-released
