= Tre Mission =

Canadian hip hop artist

- Born: Tres-von Carimbocas; Toronto, Ontario, Canada
- Genres: Grime, hip hop
- Occupations: Rapper; record producer
- Years active: 2010–present
- Labels: Big Dada; Last Gang Records; NoSuchThingNST (2010–2012)
- Website: tremission.com

Tre Mission is a Canadian rapper and record producer, known as one of the first North American artists to be associated with the predominantly United Kingdom-based grime genre. Tre Mission is a member of the Tizzy Gang grime crew alongside London based MCs Merky ACE and Cadell.

== Background ==
Originally from Toronto, Ontario, he is of Trinidadian and Jamaican descent. After discovering grime and dubstep music through the Internet, he began making his own grime tracks in 2010, and started to attract positive attention in the United Kingdom. Visiting London in 2011, he began working with established grime stars such as Wiley, JME and Skepta, and released his debut EP The Practice Mission.

He released the mixtape Malmaison in 2013, and followed up with the album Stigmata in 2014.

Stigmata includes guest appearances by Wiley, JME, Skepta, Merky Ace, Saukrates, Andreena and k-os. The album was a shortlisted Juno Award nominee for Rap Recording of the Year at the Juno Awards of 2015.

He also featured in a grime clash against Jendor in 2011, on Lord of the Mics (Volume 3).

== Discography ==
=== Albums ===
- Don't Think (2010, self-released)
- Malmaison (2013, self-released)
- Stigmata (2014, Big Dada)
- Opps Next Door (with Tizzy Gang) (2017, Last Gang)
- Orphan Black (2019, Last Gang Records)

=== Singles and EPs ===
- "Maxin Everything" (2011, Launchpad Records)
- "The Practice Mission" (2011, self-released)
- "Park Up" (2012, Lord of the Mics)
- "Stigmata" (2014, Big Dada)
- "Real Grind" (2014, Big Dada)
- "On a Wave" (2016, Last Gang Records)
- "Gang" (2016, Last Gang Records)
- "BARE001" (2018, Bare Selection)
- "Hockey" (2018, Last Gang Records)
- Hennessy Pool (2019, Last Gang Records)
- "You Can Have" (2019, Last Gang Records)
- "Make a Move" (2019, Last Gang Records)
- "Creole" (2025, Independent)
