= Kitchen Party (girl group) =

British girl group

- Also known as: WooWoos
- Origin: London, England
- Genres: Pop, UK garage
- Years active: 2011–2013
- Labels: Island; Moshi Moshi
- Past members: Jessica M-C; Tasie Dharanj; Nicky Mac; Alice Rhodes; Tanisha Spring

Kitchen Party, formerly known as WooWoos, were a British girl group from London comprising Jessica M-C, Alice Rhodes, and Tanisha Spring.

== History ==
The original line-up of the group under the name WooWoos comprised Tasie Dharanj, Jessica Martin-Campbell, and Nicky Mac. A press release for the group explained that the name WooWoos referred to "a person readily accepting supernatural, paranormal, occult, or pseudoscientific phenomena".

WooWoos released their Cameron McVey-produced debut single, "Fizzy Lettuce", via Moshi Moshi Records in November 2011, having been profiled in The Guardian's "New band of the week" feature the previous month; writer Paul Lester described them as "a girl trio with the potential to fill the gap left by Sugababes [...] they have about them an air of credibility [...] And there's a smartness and sassiness to their songs that suggest they had some hand in their creation, that they're not just three Auto-Tuned high-street honeyz". The website Popjustice wrote that they "sound quite a lot like [One Touch]-era Sugababes, which is great", while The Times wrote that "their music has the same sense of sassiness, too-cool-for-school detachment and don’t-mess-with-us front that made early Sugababes so compelling".

In early 2012, Dharanj left the group and was replaced by Alice Rhodes ahead of the release of the single "Remember Me". An album was planned for release via Island Records in 2012 but did not materialise, although the song "America" was featured on the soundtrack of the film Now Is Good. By 2013, WooWoos had renamed themselves Kitchen Party, with Tanisha Spring replacing Mac. The group explained that the new name "seemed appropriate as the kitchen in our flat seems to be the starting point of everything, most of all parties".

In May 2013, Kitchen Party released the mixtape 11th Floor. It was produced by ZDOT and Cameron McVey, mixed by DJ Cable, and includes original tracks alongside covers of Aaliyah's "One in a Million", Brandy's "I Wanna Be Down", and The Supremes' "You Can't Hurry Love". In September 2013, they released the EP Lights, which features the singles "Lights" and "Fitz's Poem", the latter of which was inspired by the novel Assassin's Apprentice. The "Lights" video was produced in collaboration with Noisey. As of October 2013, Kitchen Party were recording new material with Cameron McVey.

== Discography ==
- "Fizzy Lettuce" (2011)
- 11th Floor (2013) – mixtape
- Lights (2013) – EP
