= Big for Your Boots =

Single by Stormzy

from the album Gang Signs & Prayer
- Released: 3 February 2017
- Genre: Grime
- Length: 3:59
- Label: #Merky; Warner
- Songwriter(s): Michael Omari; Karl Joseph
- Producer(s): Sir Spyro; Fraser T. Smith (add.)

Stormzy singles chronology
"Scary" (2016)	"Big for Your Boots" (2017)	"5ive" (2017)

Music video
- "Big for Your Boots" on YouTube

"Big for Your Boots" is a song by English rapper Stormzy. It was released as the lead single from his debut studio album, Gang Signs & Prayer, on 3 February 2017, by #Merky Records. The song was written by Stormzy and produced by Sir Spyro and Fraser T. Smith. It peaked at number six on the UK Singles Chart, becoming Stormzy's highest-charting single at the time of its release.

== Music video ==
The accompanying music video, directed by Daps, was released on YouTube on 3 February 2017.

== Chart performance ==
On 10 February 2017, the song entered the UK Singles Chart at number eight, and later peaked at number six.

== Charts ==
=== Weekly charts ===
Chart (2017)	Peak position
Ireland (IRMA)	20
New Zealand Heatseekers (RMNZ)	9
Scotland (OCC)	22
UK Indie (OCC)	1
UK Hip Hop/R&B (OCC)	1
UK Singles (OCC)	6

=== Year-end charts ===
Chart (2017)	Position
UK Singles (Official Charts Company)	44

== Certifications ==
Region	Certification	Certified units/sales
New Zealand (RMNZ)	Gold	15,000^{‡}
United Kingdom (BPI)	2× Platinum	1,200,000^{‡}
^{‡} Sales+streaming figures based on certification alone.

== Release history ==
Region	Date	Label	Format
Worldwide	3 February 2017	#Merky	Digital download
