= Joshua Ribera =

British rapper (1995–2013)

Depzman

Background information
- Also known as: Depz; Depzman
- Born: Joshua Ribera; 10 August 1995; Billesley, England, Birmingham
- Died: 21 September 2013 (aged 18) Birmingham, England
- Genres: Grime; hip hop
- Occupations: Rapper; musician
- Years active: 2010–2013

Joshua Ribera (10 August 1995 – 21 September 2013), performing as Depzman, was a British rapper. Ribera featured on some of the largest music channels on YouTube that showcase grime music all across the UK, from JDZMedia, P110 and, the largest out of them all, SB.TV. He was stabbed in the heart outside of a Birmingham nightclub by Armani Mitchell. He was 18 years old.

== Life ==
Ribera was born in Solihull on 10 August 1995, to Alison Cope and Anselm Ribera, who was convicted of murder in 2009. Ribera was of Spanish and Irish descent through his father. He became serious about music after being sentenced to a young offender institution for theft, gaining a name for himself in the grime genre. In 2012, he took part in the "Lord of the Mics" battle-rap competition in London. His only album, 2 Real, was released in July 2013, and reached number 1 on the iTunes hip hop chart.

== Death ==
On 20 September 2013, Ribera attended a memorial tribute at a Selly Oak nightclub held for a friend, Kyle Sheehan “Shamz”, who had died exactly one year earlier after being stabbed in the leg. Ribera was stabbed in the heart at the event and died the next day. In March 2014, his killer, Armani Mitchell, was sentenced to life imprisonment, to serve a minimum of 18 years.
