= YGG (group) =

Grime music group

- Also known as: You Get Grime; Young Grime Gods; Young Rebel Soldiers
- Origin: London, England
- Genres: Grime
- Years active: 2006–present
- Labels: SpentShell; Keepin' It Grimy; Astral Black
- Members: Lyrical Strally; PK; Saint P

YGG (You Get Grime, formerly Young Grime Gods) are a trio of grime MCs. The group consists of founding members Saint P and PK (born Alexander Denzil Bamidale Johnson-Cole), both of whom are from Camden, and later addition Lyrical Strally (born Mluleki David Mvubu), who was born in Ealing and raised in Sunbury-on-Thames. The group have released music through Logan Sama's Keepin' It Grimy label, and are currently signed to Flowdan's label SpentShell. They have received extensive airplay on Rinse FM, BBC Radio 1 and 1Xtra and NTS, and have supported AJ Tracey on tour. In 2017, they appeared at several festivals including Glastonbury, Cambridge's Strawberries and Creem and Bristol's Love Saves the Day. In 2018, they played at Detonate Festival in Nottingham, Helios Festival in Corfu, Pop-Kultur in Germany, and Outlook Festival in Croatia.

== Career ==
=== 2006–2010: Formation as YRS and transformation into YGG ===
In an interview with Big Zuu on Radar Radio's Joints Show on 27 July 2016, PK explained how the group originated as a five-member crew in 2006, until several members dropped out. He and Saint met Lyrical Strally years later through Novelist at a cypher. PK and Lyrical Strally met again by a chance encounter in a nightclub queue, and discovered that they were both attending Kingston University (studying Music Performance and Criminology & Sociology respectively). Strally was invited to join the group as their third member.

From youth centre days... I've known Saint from primary school first of all... From there, first got into spitting and that... Originally, it was a crew called YRS. Young Rebel Soldiers... Saint wasn't there when we made that decision, so Saint come back and he was like "ras, I wanna call it YGG". Originally, there was like five members of it still... I'm not gonna tell you their names... They're my bredrins, innit... From there, obviously certain man took it seriously and that, and certain man fell off and that... We met Strally through Nov... One time I was on this uni ting... I was going there now and I seen L Esser, I was like "what?" In the rave, in the queue, I was like "what you doing here, fam?" He was like "man goes uni here!" I said "what? Link up!" Bam. I swear down, we didn't even go to no classes after that, fam, just chilling up in the park, blazing loudies... I was already going radio with Saint... and then from there... I said "yo, Strally boy, come to our side, please?" And that was it, YGG.

=== 2010–2015: Career beginnings ===
Strally's first performance on live radio was on pirate station Empire. PK and Saint have recorded music together since 2010, originally operating in a studio in Kilburn. Songs dating back to 2011 are available on PK's SoundCloud account, including "Shut Your Mouth", "Live", "Radio", "We Spit Greeze" and "Worth the Wait". In 2015, they appeared on West London MC AJ Tracey's breakthrough project The Front, on the track "Red Bull".

=== 2015–present: Breakthrough and World Domination ===
The group's debut single, "Okay", was self-released on 19 September 2015, and premiered via FACT. Joseph 'JP' Patterson, senior editor of Complex UK, wrote of the song: "It's a bouncy number... somewhat jovial... there's now plenty of room for a group like this in the market." Reviewing the song for The Quietus, Tomas Fraser observed "how different their individual styles are; Lyrical Strally, quick-witted with clear, solid diction; Saint, skippy and fast-paced (if a little erratic at times) and PK, a loud, confident, reload-friendly MC with a reputation for turning raves upside down already under his belt." YGG's second single, "Don't Talk Like That" was self-released on 5 January 2016. The song was premiered by i-D, and a remix featuring guest vocals from Spitz, Mic Ty, Big Zuu, Jay Amo and AJ Tracey was released in June of the same year.

In 2017, the group signed to BBC and Rinse FM DJ Logan Sama's record label, Keepin' It Grimy. They released a standalone single entitled "Bad" on 31 March, which was hailed by Pigeons and Planes as an "instant underground anthem". The trio released their debut extended play, World Domination, on 28 November 2017 through Keepin' It Grimy. The project features six group tracks as well as a solo track from each artist, and was preceded by the single "Three IC3s" and the promotional single "Lyca".

In 2018, the group signed to Flowdan's record label and management company, SpentShell. PK released his four-track debut solo EP, The Bad Ombré, with the label on 2 February 2018. In an interview with Notion, the other two group members revealed that they too have been working on solo content: Lyrical Strally has a forthcoming song entitled "I Finesse", while Saint mentioned a song entitled "On To". On 27 April 2018, they released the standalone single "Strikers" through Astral Black, featuring production from Jon Phonics and Impey.

== Members ==
Current

- Saint P – vocals (2006–present)
- PK – vocals (2006–present)
- Lyrical Strally – vocals (2014–present)
- Travis-T – DJ (2016–present)

== Discography ==
=== Extended plays ===
Year	Extended play	Label
2017	World Domination	Keepin' It Grimy

=== Singles ===
Year	Track	Release
2015	"Okay"	Non-album single
2016	"Don't Talk Like That"	Non-album single
2017	"Bad"	Non-album single
2017	"Three IC3s"	World Domination
2018	"Strikers"	Non-album single
2018	"Turn Up"	Non-album single
2020	"Royals"	1FGRM005 (Grime)
2020	"Fathers"	Non-album single

=== Promotional singles ===
Year	Track	Release
2017	"Lyca"	World Domination

=== Other appearances ===
Year	Track	Release	Label
2015	"Swerve N Skid (Remix)" (AJ Tracey featuring YGG, RD, Big Zuu, Ten Dixon, Sketch, C Cane, Dubz D, Kyeza, Snowy, Mic Ty, Mez, Row D, Spitz and Jay Amo)	Non-album single	My Team Paid
2015	"Red Bull" (AJ Tracey featuring YGG)	The Front	My Team Paid
2016	"Violation (Remix)" (Jay Amo featuring Capo Lee, Mr X, RD, Wax, YGG, Spitz, Ets, Mic Ty and Big Zuu)	Goldmine	Self-released
2016	"Arrogant Stance (Eski Thug)" (Darkness featuring AJ Tracey, YGG, Big Zuu, Darkos Strife, Kwam, Nico Lindsay, Elf Kid, Hilts, GHSTLY XXVII)	Eski Thug	Triangulum
2016	"Finish the Bar" (Capo Lee featuring Nico Lindsay and YGG)	Why Not? 2	Red Bull Studios London
2016	"This Ain't a Game"	Why Not? 2	Red Bull Studios London
2017	"Fruit Salad" (Polonis and JEB1 featuring YGG)	Beat Roots	Red Bull Studios London
2017	"See Us MC" (Filthy Gears featuring P Money, YGG and MTP)	Filthy Gears	Mandem Worldwide
2017	"World Domination" (FKD featuring YGG)	FKD	SAIKOUT

=== Remixes ===
Year	Song	Artist
2016	"Side By Side"	Sir Spyro
