= Mayhem NODB =

British grime MC

Mayhem
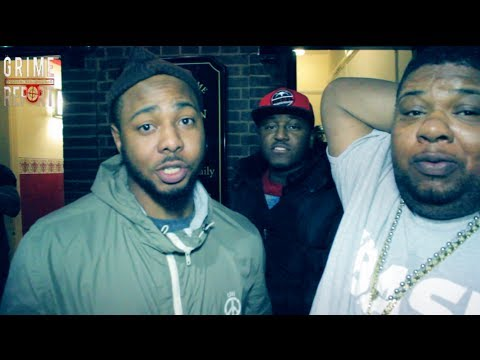
- Mayhem (left) in 2015

Background information
- Born: Ojay George Miller
- Origin: Birmingham, England
- Genres: Grime; dubstep; drum and bass
- Occupation: MC
- Years active: 2003 – present
- Label: StayFresh

Ojay George Miller, better known as Mayhem and Mayhem NODB (commonly stylised as MaYHeM NODB), is a grime MC from Handsworth, Birmingham, England. He is one of the founding members of NODB alongside Deadly.

== Early life ==
Mayhem was born and raised in Lozells, Birmingham and moved to Handsworth as a teen, he started rapping in primary school, by the time he was 14, he was performing at dances and raves. He rose to prominence in Birmingham with the song "Pum Pum Punashum".

== Music ==
NODB was the first grime group from Birmingham to feature on BBC 1Xtra this helped to popularise grime in Birmingham and the wider West Midlands. In 2011, Mayhem was released from Prison and he created and released his first CD "Mr Splash" in 2012. When Mr Splash released, Mayhem was confused and angry after just being released from Prison, it features a gritty sound. Mayhem's second album was titled "Its Peakum" which was released in 2013 and features a more accessible sound when compared to Mr Splash, and in 2015, the mixtape "Gassum" was released featuring London MC Big Narstie and Deadly.

== Feud with Wiley ==
In 2012, Wiley released "Step 2 Freestyle" in which Mayhem alleged that Wiley copied his style by using "UM" at the ends of words something which Mayhem has been known for. Mayhem was angered by Wiley stating that he did not know who he was, however, Mayhem claims they performed at various raves together. Wiley then followed up with his track Step 6 and at 1.22 of the track he reaffirms that he did not know who Mayhem was. Mayhem responded with a video titled "Mayhem NODB Replies to the Cat Wiley

== CDs and Mixtapes ==
Title	Details
Mr Splash	Released: 10 January 2012; Label: Grime Zombie; Formats: Digital download and CD
It's Peakum	Released: 1 July 2013; Label: Ministry of Mayhem; Formats: Digital download and CD
Gassum	Released: 18 January 2015; Label: Ministry of Mayhem/StayFresh; Formats: Digital download and CD
Mr Hazeum	Released: 20 April 2018; Formats: Digital download
