= DJ Cable =

- Born: Chris Painter
- Origin: Essex, England
- Genres: Hip Hop, Dubstep, Electronica, Grime
- Occupations: DJ, Producer
- Years active: 1999–present
- Label: Triangulum Recordings

DJ Cable is a British DJ, based in Essex, England. Notable for winning numerous DJ competitions, such as the DMC UK Team Championships (three times consecutively) and the "Alizé Remixed" DJ competition, he was the tour DJ for Willy Moon for his 2012 European dates, and previously for UK singer/songwriter Yasmin. He also owns and runs Triangulum Recordings, a digital record label.

In May 2014, DJ Cable joined BBC Radio 1Xtra as part of the "Sixty Minutes" roster, alongside DJs such as Hannah Wants and Logan Sama, playing a mixture of hip hop, grime and drum and bass music.

== Accolades ==
DMC Championships

- 2010: DMC UK Team Champion with Bionic Stylus (3rd Place World Finals)
- 2009: DMC UK Team Champion with Bionic Stylus (3rd Place World Finals)
- 2008: DMC UK Team Champion with Bionic Stylus (4th Place World Finals)
- 2007: DMC UK Finals (3rd Place)
- 2006: DMC UK Finals
- 2006: DMC Battle for UK Supremacy (Runner-up)

Other competitions

- 2010: Dogs on Acid x Urban Art Forms Mix Competition (Winner)
- 2009: Vice Magazine x Grolsch Block Party Mix Competition (Winner)
- 2008: "Alizé Remixed" Champion

== Major performances ==
- Jack White UK Tour, Autumn 2012 (With Willy Moon)
- The Jools Holland Show, October 2012 (With Willy Moon)
- Bestival 2012
- Wireless Festival 2012
- Tyga UK Tour, May 2012
- Snoop Dogg UK Tour, Autumn 2011
- Glastonbury Festival 2011
- Wireless Festival 2011
- Chase & Status "No More Idols" UK Tour (With Yasmin)

== Discography ==
- DJ Cable "Cartridge VIP"
- Lolo Feat. Giggs "Gangsters" (DJ Cable Remix)
- Dizzee Rascal "I Don't Need A Reason" (DJ Cable Remix)
- KCAT "Take You To Heaven" (DJ Cable Remix)
- Majestic Featuring Jungle 70 "Creeping In The Dark (DJ Cable Remix)
- Dizzee Rascal Featuring Robbie Williams "Goin' Crazy" (DJ Cable Remix)
- DJ Cable Featuring Goldfinger "Cartridge"
- TS7 Featuring Taylor Fowlis "Heartlight" (DJ Cable 'Back To 93' Remix)
- DECiBEL Featuring Flowdan "Skanks" (DJ Cable Remix)
- Enigma Dubz Featuring Trilla "We Make It Work" (DJ Cable Remix)
- Kitchen Party – 11th Floor (mixed by DJ Cable)

== Media appearances ==
- BBC Radio 1, 1Xtra, CBBC, iDJ Magazine, Channel 4, BBC 1, Kiss FM, BBC Asian Network, Rinse FM, Radar Radio, Crep Junkie.
