= Chantelle Fiddy =

British journalist

- Occupations: Writer; columnist; journalist; music industry professional
- Years active: (2001–present)

Chantelle Fiddy is a British journalist, columnist, event promoter and music industry professional. She is well known as a commentator on London's grime scene and as a social activist as the former editor of Ctrl.Alt.Shift. She is currently contributing editor at RWD Magazine and urban editor at Mixmag. Her work has also appeared in i-D, Dazed & Confused, Sunday Times Style, The Guardian and The London Paper. Fiddy has also worked in television and radio. She was a featured presenter in Channel 4's Generation Next series and has appeared as a guest on BBC Radio 1's Review Show. She also presented a 40-minute documentary on Lady Sovereign for BBC 1Xtra. Fiddy is one of the tastemakers who puts together the BBC's 'Sound of' List. In 2013, Fiddy starred in the BBC documentary series VIP People with pop star A*M*E, and went behind-the-scenes on how to make a fanzine and how to become a successful recording artist. Fiddy is soon to feature in the latest Channel 4 style series by Ewen Spencer. After moving into music management in 2013, Fiddy has worked on the careers of Duke Dumont, Arkon Fly and Kelli-Leigh among others.

== Career ==
=== Chantelle Fiddy's World of Grime ===
Fiddy's blog Chantelle Fiddy's World of Grime has been a widely read source of news about the burgeoning grime scene since 2004. In 2005, it was featured in VIBE magazine's top 10 music blogs. Fiddy also wrote for the scene's leading print magazines, including Touch, Deuce, Jockey Slut and Muzik. She has written artist biographies for Wiley, Giggs and Lady Sovereign.

=== LIVE magazine ===
In 2007, Fiddy became managing editor at LIVE magazine. She mentored young people aged 13–21, providing journalism teaching and career guidance as well as helping the group achieve personal successes and goals.

=== Ctrl.Alt.Shift ===
In 2008, Fiddy became Editor of Ctrl.Alt.Shift, a new initiative on behalf of Christian Aid. Her role was to use popular culture to engage previously apathetic 18- to 25-year-olds in global issues such as international development. Ctrl.Alt.Shift produced a website and a magazine which became the first third sector publication to go on sale as a consumer title. She also worked on direct action events such as protests outside embassies and campaigns for women's rights. She worked with Riz Ahmed to create the United Underground events at the Southbank Centre and organised a Rave for Haiti with acts including Ms Dynamite, Tinie Tempah and Sway, which raised over £10,000.
