= Jaykae =

English rapper and actor

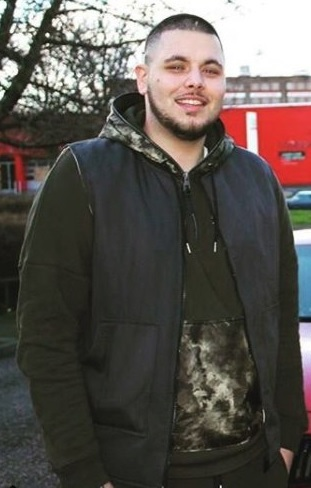
- Jaykae in 2018

Background information
- Born: Janum Khan; Small Heath, Birmingham, England
- Genres: Hip hop; grime
- Years active: 2008–present
- Labels: Doing Bits Worldwide Limited; Jaykae
- Website: twitter.com/jaykae10

Janum Khan, better known by his stage name Jaykae, is a British rapper and actor from Small Heath, Birmingham.

== Music career ==
Jaykae's start with music began when he started listening to other grime artists from London.

In 2017 he released a single, "Every Country," featuring Murkage Dave of the Murkage cartel. The song, produced by Skepta, was Radio 1's Tune of the Week. He has featured on Charlie Sloth's BBC show, Fire In The Booth, where he performed a two-piece set which reflected on life and the recent passing of fellow grime artist and friend, Depzman. He has performed on the BBC radio show segment, The BBC Live Lounge, where he performed two of his own songs, "Moscow" and "Toothache", and also a cover of Cameo's "Candy". Jaykae was described by the 2017 MOBO Awards website as the "essential voice of the city" of Birmingham.

He featured on Skepta's All-Star Remix of the single '"That's not me". He collaborated with Mike Skinner (of The Streets) producing the tracks "CCTV" and "Boys Will Be Boys". Jaykae has performed at Glastonbury, MADE, Reading Festival, Creamfields and Wireless Festival. He supported Skepta on his Konnichiwa tour, supported Stormzy at one of his gigs, and will also be supporting The Streets on their upcoming Greatest Hits tour. Jaykae was brought out at Drake's 2019 Birmingham concert. Jaykae completed his first solo headline tour in December 2017, where he performed in Manchester, London and Birmingham.

Jaykae's "Toothache" featured on the TV series Power.

In 2021, he collaborated with Jorja Smith on "1000 Nights".

== Acting career ==
Khan plays Azaar, a cocaine dealer in Small Heath, in season two of the BBC Three comedy-drama, Man Like Mobeen. In 2018, he appeared as himself on season three of Chicken Shop Date.

In the Amazon Prime Video series, Jungle, Khan plays Willow, an associate of one of the show's main villains. An Evening Standard review of the show states that Khan "lends a disconcerting lightness to his gangster role."

== Personal life ==
Khan was born and raised in Small Heath, Birmingham, to a mixed background of White Irish and Pakistani descent; his maternal grandfather is from Dadyal, Mirpur, while his father is from Hameed, near Hazro in Attock District. He is an avid supporter of his local football club Birmingham City. He had a difficult childhood and was bullied as a young child.

== Discography ==
=== Studio albums ===
List of studio albums, with release date and select details.
Title	Details
Where Have You Been?	Total tracks: 8; Total length: 26:59; Released: 8 December 2017; Formats: Digital download; Doing Bits Worldwide Limited

=== Extended plays ===
List of extended plays, with release date and select details.
Title	Details
A Bite to Eat	Total tracks: 7; Total length: 22:42; Released: 9 June 2013; Formats: Digital download
Froggy (with Dapz OTM)	Total tracks: 5; Total length: 25:05; Released: 9 June 2014; Formats: Digital download

=== Compilations ===
List of compilations, with release date and select details.
Title	Details
Certain Man	Total tracks: 7; Total length: 22:42; Released: 9 June 2013; Formats: Digital download

=== Singles ===
==== As lead artist ====
List of singles as a lead artist, with selected chart positions and certifications, and album name
Title	Year	Peak chart positions		Certifications	Album
Title	Year	UK	UK Ind.	Certifications	Album
"Toothache"	2016	—	—	BPI: Gold	Where Have You Been?
"Pull Up" (featuring Bowser Boss)	2016	—	—		Where Have You Been?
"No" (featuring Bowser Boss)	2017	—	—		Non-album single
"Every Country" (featuring Murkage Dave)	2017	—	—		Where Have You Been?
"Moscow" (featuring Bowser Boss)	2017	—	—	BPI: Silver	Where Have You Been?
"Heartache"	2019	—	39		TBA
"On the Way Home" (with Aitch featuring Bowser Boss)	2019	73	13	BPI: Silver	TBA
"Chat" (featuring Local)	2019	—	—		TBA
"Froggy 2" (with Dapz on the Map)	2019	—	—		TBA
"On Top"	2020	—	—		TBA
"Novocaine" (featuring Remtrex)	2020	—	—		TBA
"Chop (Henry the 8th)"	2021	—	—		TBA
"1000 Nights" (featuring Jorja Smith)	2021	—	—		TBA
"—" denotes a recording that did not chart or was not released in that territory.

==== As featured artist ====
List of singles as a featured artist, showing year released, and album name
Title	Year	Peak chart positions	Certifications	Album
Title	Year	UK	Certifications	Album
"Boys Will Be Boys" (The Streets featuring Jaykae)	2018	—		Non-album singles
"Honey Dew (FTSE Club Edit)" (Rude Kid, FTSE and JayKae)	2018	—		Non-album singles
"Cheatin (UGK Remix)" (Nathan Dawe featuring JayKae, Bru-C, Malika, and UGK)	2018	—		Non-album singles
"Toast to Our Differences (Remix)" (Rudimental featuring JayKae, Cadet, and Shungudzo)	2018	—		Non-album singles
"Dunya" (Big Stygs featuring Jaykae)	2019	—		Non-album singles
"Wicked and Bad" (Tom Zanetti featuring JayKae)	2019	—		Non-album singles
"Faded" (Sam Tompkins featuring JayKae)	2019	—		From My Sleeve to the World
"Flowers" (Nathan Dawe featuring Jaykae)	2019	12	BPI: Platinum	If Heaven Had a Phone Line
"Take Me Back to London (Remix)" (Ed Sheeran featuring Stormzy, JayKae, and Aitch)	2019	—		Non-album singles
"[[Take Me Back to London#Remix|Take Me Back to London (Sir Spyro Remix)]]" (Ed Sheeran featuring Stormzy, JayKae, and Aitch)	2019	—		Non-album singles
"Tears Don't Dry" (Grim Sickers featuring JayKae and Rob Harvey)	2019	—		Non-album singles
"Bally" (Remix) (Swarmz featuring Geko, JayKae, Kwengface and 23 Unofficial)	2019	—		Non-album singles
"1AM" (Kida Kudz featuring Jaykae)	2020	—		Nasty
"Again" (CLIPZ featuring Ms Banks, Ms. Dynamite and JayKae)	2020	—		Non-album single
"Mozambique" (Ghetts featuring Jaykae and Moonchild Sanelly)	2020	—		Conflict of Interest
"Believe Me (Remix)" (Navos featuring JayKae)	2021	—		Non-album singles
"Playing Games (Remix)" (Silky featuring French the Kid & JayKae)	2021	—		Non-album singles
"Lively" (Double Lz featuring JayKae and Blair Muir)	2022	—		Non-album singles
"Animal" (Arma featuring JayKae and Edge 22)	2024	8		Animal
"—" denotes a recording that did not chart or was not released in that territory.

=== Guest appearances ===
List of guest appearances, showing year released, other artists and album name
Title	Year	Other artist(s)	Album
"Grow Up"	2019	Slowthai	Nothing Great About Britain
