= Jammz =

British grime MC and producer

- Born: 21 May 1991 (age 35); London, England
- Origin: Hackney, London, England
- Genre: Grime
- Occupations: MC; record producer
- Instruments: Vocals
- Years active: 2002–present
- Labels: I Am Grime; Floor Sixx; Local Action

Jammz (born 21 May 1991), is a grime MC and record producer from Hackney, East London and the founder of the record label I Am Grime.

== Career ==
Although he had already released an early mixtape, Jammz started to make a proper name for himself in 2014, and was frequently cited as part of grime's "radio renaissance" of those years due to his appearances on radio stations such as Rinse FM, BBC Radio 1xtra, NTS and Radar Radio.

His single 'Hit Then Run', released in 2015, was voted as Noisey's Third Best Grime Track of that year and was playlisted on BBC Radio 1xtra. He also collaborated with Plastician on the single 'London Living', and Finn & Fallow on the single 'Final Warning'.

In March 2016, Jammz supported Kano on the UK leg of his Made In The Manor tour and featured on the front cover of the Observer Music Magazine, alongside Krept & Konan, Stormzy, Novelist and Little Sims as part of an article titled 'How British MCs Found a Voice of Their Own'. In July 2016, he featured in GQ's documentary The Business of Grime.

In November 2016 Jammz released his Warrior EP to acclaim from Fader, Complex, FACT Mag, Noisey and more, and he performed at his first London headline show in December of that year.

In 2017 he collaborated with DJ Q on the single 'Who's That Girl', an answer song to Dizzee Rascal's "I Luv U", and released the singles 'Oh Please' and 'Know Yourself' (with Westy).

In 2018, Jammz released the highly anticipated follow up to his Warrior EP, Warrior 2, and followed up by embarking on his first headline tour, The Warrior tour, with artists such as Capo Lee, Manga Saint Hilare, Flowdan, & more.

== Theatre ==
In 2018 Jammz began his journey into the world of theatre, appearing in the critically acclaimed play Poet In Da Corner, at The Royal Court Theatre. The play returned to the theatre in 2019, and toured the UK, before being cut short due to the COVID-19 Pandemic.

Since then Jammz has gone on to be commissioned as a composer, musical director, & writer, with his work being showcased in theatres such as The Big House, New Diorama & more.

== Personal life ==
Jammz is of Jamaican and Vincentian descent.

== Discography ==
=== Solo ===
Albums

- 2010: What's The Latest
- 2016: Underdog Season
- 2017: Free Up The Riddims Volume 1
- 2020: Free Up The Riddims Volume 2
- 2021: Free Up The Riddims Volume 3
- 2022: Free Up The Riddims Volume 4
- 2022: Pink Lemonade
- 2024: No Remorse

EPs

- 2010: I Am Grime
- 2012: I Am Grime - The Myth Edition
- 2015: Hit Then Run EP
- 2016: Keep It Simple / The World
- 2016: Warrior EP
- 2018: Warrior II
- 2019: French Montanna EP

Singles

- 2015: Final Warning
- 2016: 10 Missed Calls
- 2017: Who's That Girl?
- 2017: Oh Please
- 2018: Everything Dead
- 2021: Dark & Light
- 2024: If U Need Me
- 2024: Long For Them
- 2024: Who Can't Hear
- 2024: Pão de Açúcar

=== Collaborative ===
Albums

- 2020: IAG Is The Label Volume 1 (w/ D-Structo, Jack Dat, Gesher & More)
- 2021: The Avengers LP (w/ Mayhem NODB, Blay Vision & Buggsy)
- 2023: Make The Ting (Elijah & Jammz)
