= Flowdan =

English grime MC and record producer (born 1980)

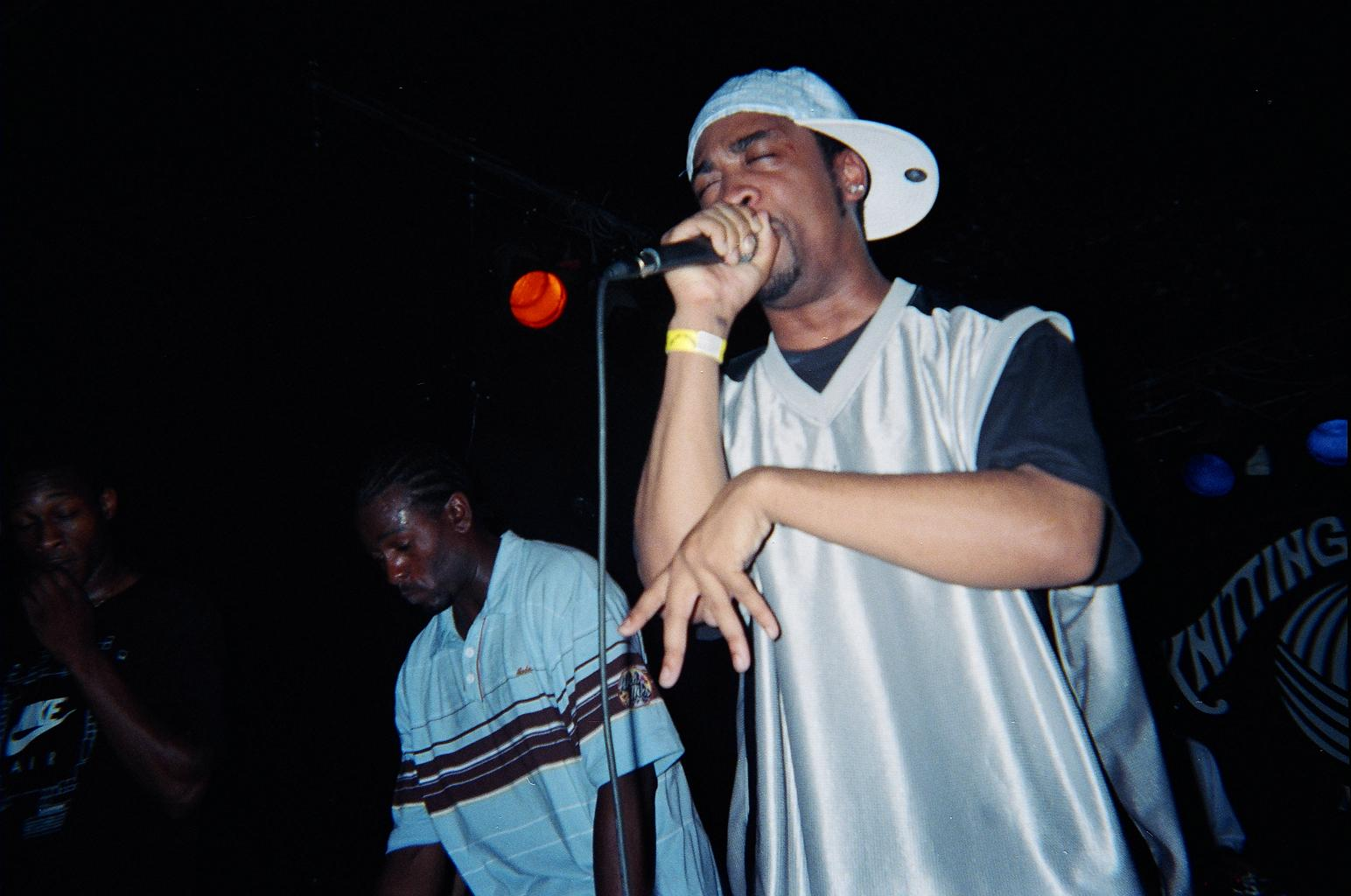
- Trim (left), Flowdan (center), and Wiley (right) in 2005

Background information
- Born: Marc Anthony Veira; 17 March 1980 (age 46); Newham, London, England
- Origin: Bow, London, England
- Genres: Grime; dubstep; drum and bass
- Occupations: MC; producer
- Years active: 2001–present
- Labels: SpentShell; Tru Thoughts; Hyperdub; Atlantic UK

Marc Anthony Veira (born 17 March 1980), better known by his stage name Flowdan, is an English grime MC and record producer. A founding member of Roll Deep, he was responsible for naming the group and remained a member until its hiatus. In 2015, he founded his record label, SpentShell, which has since signed YGG and GHSTLY XXVII to its roster. In 2023, he featured on two songs which reached the top 20 of the UK Singles Chart, and in 2024 he won his first Grammy Award for the Skrillex and Fred Again collaboration "Rumble", becoming the first grime MC to win a Grammy in any category.

== Career ==
A founding member of Roll Deep, Veira appears intermittently on all five of their albums, although notably does not appear on any of their five singles to register on the UK Top 40. A good friend of Wiley, the crew's de facto leader, he came from a drum and bass and jungle background and was part of the first wave of grime MCs. He was one of nine artists to feature on Lethal Bizzle's 2004 single "Pow! (Forward)", which reached number eleven on the UK Singles Chart, making it one of the most commercially successful grime songs to date. The song also won the MOBO Award for Best Single. Veira's first solo album, Original Dan, was released in 2009 and featured a range of guest artists, including Frisco, Wiley, Killa P and Riko. An EP, Serious Business, followed in 2014, and his second full-length album Disaster Piece was released in 2016, to more positive reviews than his debut.

Flowdan is also known for his frequent collaboration with dub and dancehall producer The Bug, and has appeared on at least seven of his songs. In 2017, the pair's collaboration "Bad" peaked at number 37 on the UK Physical Singles Chart. This was Veira's second named appearance on the chart, having reached number 63 with the Jubei collaboration "Say Nothin'" in 2013.

In 2018, Flowdan forayed further into record production. He produced tracks for PK's Bad Ombré EP and GHSTLY XXVII's Guerrilla Tactics EP, the first two releases on his new label, SpentShell. He also contributed preset sounds and samples as well as entire demo tracks to Native Instruments' Maschine expansion pack 'London Grit'. In June 2018, he released the four-track One Shell Fits All EP, featuring vocals from D Double E, Nasty Jack, GHSTLY XXVII and Meridian Dan, and production from Masro, Teddy Music, Filthy Gears and Jammz.

In 2023, Veira released multiple collaborations with electronic dance music producer Skrillex, including the Fred Again collaboration "Rumble". Released in January 2023, it peaked at number 19 on the UK Singles Chart, marking Flowdan's second top 40 hit. He bettered this record with the Chase & Status and Bou collaboration "Baddadan", which spent over 20 continuous weeks on the UK Singles Chart, peaking at number five and also topping the country's Official Trending Chart. The song was certified Platinum by the BPI in March 2024, in recognition of the equivalent of 600,000 sales. In October of the same year, he reunited with Skrillex for the Lil Baby-featuring "Pepper", and performed the song live at the opening ceremony of the fourth Riyadh Season. Boxer Francis Ngannou, who faced Tyson Fury at a heavyweight championship match at the event, appears in the song's music video alongside footballer Cristiano Ronaldo. "Rumble" later won the 2024 Grammy Award for Best Dance/Electronic Recording. The song is also certified Silver by the BPI, in recognition of the equivalent of 200,000 sales.

== Style ==
Flowdan is known for his deep voice and use of patois lyrics. Although rooted in grime, he performs over various different styles, from the drum and bass of his early days, to the dubstep of his numerous features with The Bug.

== Discography ==
=== Solo ===
Albums

- 2009: Original Dan
- 2016: Disaster Piece
- 2019: Full Metal Jacket

EPs

- 2014: Serious Business
- 2018: One Shell Fits All
- 2020: The Red Pill

Singles

- 2002: "Big Mic Man"
- 2003: "Skydiver"
- 2016: "Horror Show Style"
- 2016: "Grime"
- 2017: "Original Raggamuffin" (featuring Wiley)
- 2019: "Welcome to London"

=== As featured artist ===
- 2001: "Terrible" (Roll Deep Entourage featuring Wiley, Breeze, Bubbles, and Flowdan)
- 2001: "Wickedest Ting" (Geeneus & Wiley featuring Flowdan & Breeze)
- 2001: "1, 2, 3, 4..." (Pay As U Go Cartel)
- 2001: "Dem No Ready" (Pay As U Go Cartel)
- 2003: "Time Wasters" (Remix) (Musketeers featuring Maxwell D & Flowdan)
- 2004: "Pow! (Forward)" (Lethal Bizzle featuring Fumin, D Double E, Napper, Jamakabi, Neeko, Demon, Ozzie B, Forcer, and Flowdan)
- 2007: "Skeng" (The Bug featuring Killa P & Flowdan)
- 2007: "Jah War" (The Bug featuring Flowdan)
- 2007: "Poison Dart" (The Bug featuring Warrior Queen & Flowdan)
- 2008: "Badman Talking" (Wiley featuring Flowdan)
- 2009: "Bullet A' Go Fly" (DVA featuring Badness, Riko, Killa P, and Flowdan)
- 2012: "Say Nothin'" (Jubei featuring Flowdan)
- 2013: "Badman City" (Kahn featuring Flowdan)
- 2016: "Hot like Jamaica" (Frisco featuring Newbaan & Flowdan)
- 2017: "Round Here" (Lethal Bizzle featuring Giggs & Flowdan)
- 2017: "Round Here - Remix" (Lethal Bizzle featuring Abra Cadabra, Ghetts, Frisco, and Flowdan)
- 2018: "Inventor" (Rockwell featuring Flowdan)
- 2019: "Start Up" (Boylan featuring Flowdan)
- 2019: "London In The Rain" (Meridian Dan featuring Flowdan)
- 2020: “Empire” (The Funk Hunters & Stickybuds featuring Flowdan)
- 2021: "Trenches" (Duke & Jones featuring Flowdan)
- 2021: "Power" (Millbrook & Flowdan)
- 2022: "Gassed Up" (Zeds Dead & Subtronics featuring Flowdan)
- 2023: "Rumble” (Skrillex, Fred Again, and Flowdan)
- 2023: "Hydrate" (Skrillex with Flowdan, Beam, and Peekaboo)
- 2023: "Musket" (Rohaan featuring Flowdan)
- 2023: "Wild Guide" (Le Motel & Flowdan)
- 2023: "Outlaw" (IMANU featuring Flowdan)
- 2023: "Wicked" (Sudley, Anaïs, and Flowdan)
- 2023: "Ten Ton" (Substance with Flowdan)
- 2023: "Baddadan" (Chase & Status and Bou featuring Irah, Flowdan, Trigga, and Takura)
- 2023: "Shella Verse" (Sammy Virji & Flowdan)
- 2023: "Wavy" (Mazde featuring Flowdan)
- 2023: “Badders” (PEEKABOO with Flowdan, Skrillex, and G-Rex)
- 2023: "Saga" (L'ENTOURLOOP featuring Flowdan, Killa P, and Big Red)
- 2023: “Pepper” (Flowdan, Skrillex, and Lil Baby)
- 2023: "My Crew" (Danny Avila & Flowdan)
- 2023: “Push Up (Like Dynamite)” (Creeds & Flowdan)
- 2024: “Do My Ting” (Barclay Crenshaw, Flowdan & Stush)
- 2024: “Stealth Bomber” (Whethan & Flowdan)
- 2024: “Boost Up” (FISHER & Flowdan)
- 2024: “Our Sector” (Ben Klock & Fadi Mohem featuring Flowdan)
- 2024: “Grime Scene Saviours” (Chip featuring D Double E, Frisco, Flirta D, Skepta, Bruza, JME, Jendor, Novelist, Jamakabi, and Flowdan)
- 2025: “Hunter” (Subtronics & Flowdan)
- 2025: “Up Top” (NGHTMRE, Flowdan, and Sully)
- 2025: “Do It Like Me” (White Pony, Riko Dan, and Flowdan)
- 2025: “Coast 2 Coast” (GRiZ featuring Flowdan)
- 2025: “With My Crew” (Zaza featuring Flowdan)
- 2025: “Owe Me One” (Frisco, Jme, JayaHadADream, and Flowdan)
- 2025: “Match My Mood” (Sammy Virji, Spice, Flowdan)

=== With Roll Deep ===
Albums

- 2005: In at the Deep End
- 2007: Rules and Regulations
- 2008: Return of the Big Money Sound
- 2010: Winner Stays On
- 2012: X

== Awards and nominations ==
Year	Nominee / work	Award	Result	Ref.
2005	"Pow! (Forward)" (Lethal Bizzle featuring Fumin, D Double E, Napper, Jamakabi, Neeko, Flowdan, Ozzie B, Forcer, and Demon)	MOBO Award for Best Single	Won	
2024	"Rumble" (with Skrillex and Fred Again)	Grammy Award for Best Dance/Electronic Recording	Won	
2024	Flowdan	BBC Radio 1 Dance's Dance Vocalist Award 2024	Won	
