= Merky ACE =

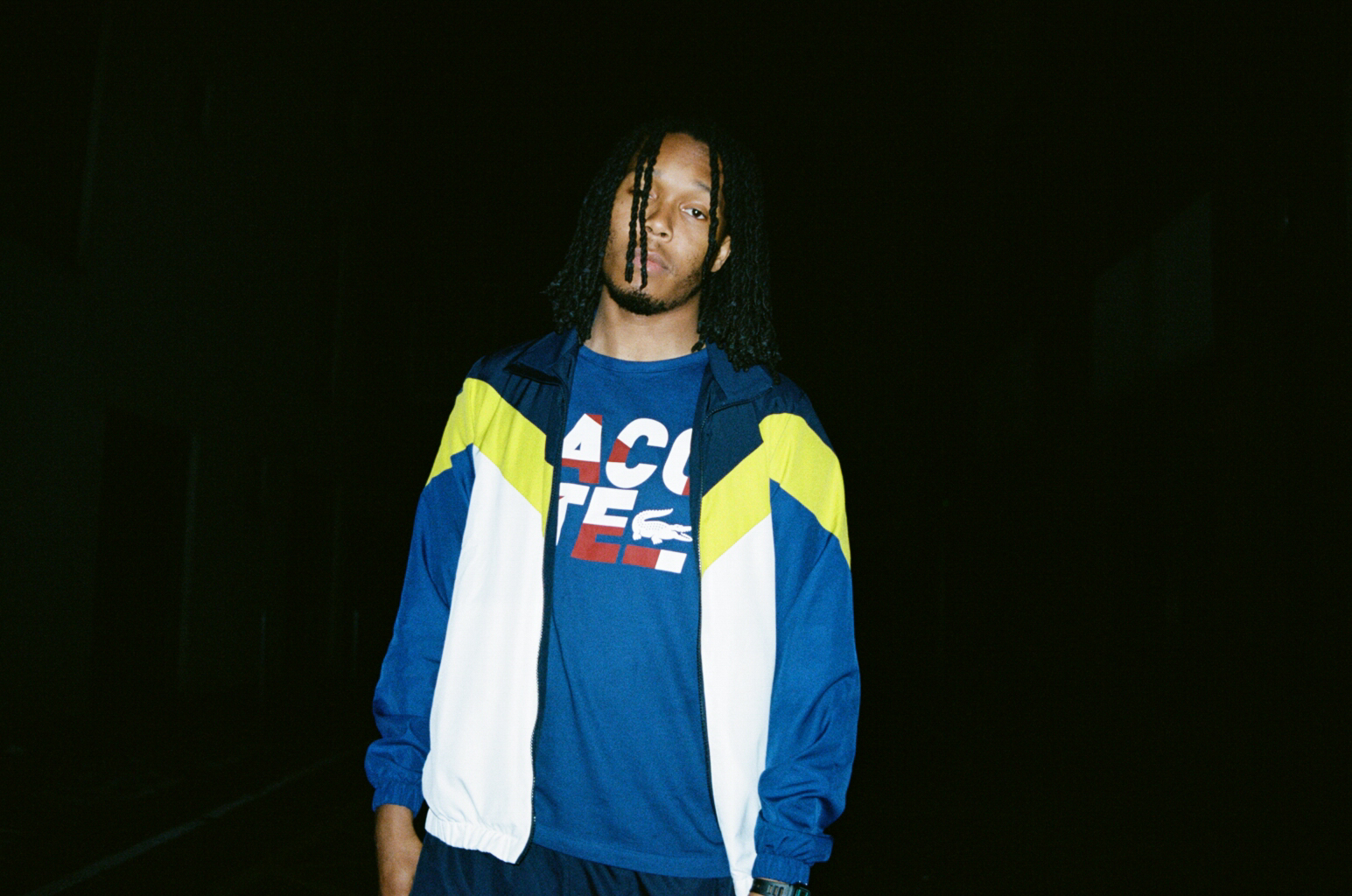
- Merky ACE in 2017.

Background information
- Also known as: Splurt Diablo
- Born: Aisa Sampson; 1 April 1992 (age 34); Peckham, London, England
- Origin: Lewisham, London, England
- Genres: Grime; trap; dubstep
- Occupations: MC; rapper; songwriter; record producer
- Years active: 2009–present
- Labels: Tizzy Gang; Family Tree; Dirtee Stank; TUIGSE; Oil Gang
- Website: merkyace.com

Aisa Khan Sampson-Spencer (born 1 April 1992), known professionally as Merky ACE, is a British grime MC, rapper, songwriter and record producer from Lewisham, South London. He was a founding member of the grime collective Family Tree, and later Tizzy Gang, with whom he is still a part of. He also produces beats under the pseudonym Splurt Diablo. His debut album, Blue Battlefield, was released on 3 April 2011.

== Career ==
Merky ACE first came to prominence on the UK underground scene as part of grime's "new wave" in 2011. In the same year he independently released his acclaimed Blue Battlefield mixtape and followed it up with the Catch Up EP in the same year. In 2012, Merky ACE recorded features for Dizzee Rascal's Dirtee TV 2 mixtape which was released on Christmas of that year. In 2013, he released two mixtapes - All or Nothing and Play Your Position - through grime label NoHatsNoHoods.

In 2014, Merky ACE was signed to Dizzee Rascal's label Dirtee Stank. Merky ACE's first project on the label Peak Levels EP was released on 17 July 2015. In late 2015, Merky ACE formed a new crew, Tizzy Gang alongside Tre Mission and Cadell; following this news, Family Tree disbanded shortly after in early 2016.

Merky was a joint executive producer of Tizzy Gang's debut collaborative album, Opps Next Door Vol. 1, which was released on 16 June 2017. He provided vocals for fifteen of the album's twenty tracks, and produced many of its tracks under his Splurt Diablo alias. The album's release was celebrated with a launch party at Relentless No. 5 in London.

His debut solo album, War Is Normal, was released on 11 May 2018. The album features the singles "TDF", "Black Hawk Down", and "Out of Order", which were released on 9 March, 16 March, and 23 March 2018 respectively. The first two of these tracks had previously premiered on his SoundCloud in 2016, as had "Ruff's the New Buff", "Crash Bang Sound", and "What's the Program?".

On 5 June 2020, Merky marked his first collaboration with fellow grime MC Capo Lee with a joint project, the Clash of the Pagans EP.

== Discography ==
=== Albums ===
Title	Details
Opps Next Door (with Tizzy Gang)	Released: 16 June 2017; Label: Last Gang Records; Formats: Digital download
War is Normal	Released: 11 May 2018; Label: Tizzy Gang, TUISGE; Formats: Digital download

=== Compilation albums ===
Title	Details
Best of Merky ACE	Released: 28 September 2009; Label: Self-released; Formats: Free digital download; Features songs from Headtop Turner, Normal and Who's Merky? alongside bonus tracks

=== Mixtapes ===
Title	Details
Headtop Turner	Released: 2008; Label: Headtop Turner Entertainment; Formats: CD, free digital download
Watch Me Leave Scars	Released: 17 February 2008; Label: Headtop Turner Entertainment; Formats: CD, free digital download
NWO: New World Order	Released: 2008; Label: Headtop Turner Entertainment; Formats: CD, free digital download
Normal	Released: 8 May 2009; Label: Self-released; Formats: CD, free digital download
Who's Merky?	Released: 9 August 2009; Label: Self-released; Formats: CD, free digital download
Grime	Released: 2009; Label: Family Tree; Formats: CD, free digital download
The Ones That Didn't Make It	Released: 4 July 2010; Label: Family Tree; Formats: CD, free digital download
Blue Battlefield	Released: 4 April 2011; Label: Family Tree; Formats: CD, digital download
All Or Nothing	Released: 27 May 2013; Label: NoHatsNoHoods; Formats: CD, digital download
Play Your Position	Released: 14 October 2013; Label: NoHatsNoHoods; Formats: CD, digital download

=== EPs ===
Title	Details
Shinobi (with Splurt Diablo)	Released: 27 October 2009; Label: Family Tree; Formats: Free digital download
The Recycle Bin	Released: 2 November 2010; Label: Family Tree; Formats: Free digital download
Catch Up	Released: 12 December 2011; Label: Family Tree; Formats: Digital download
Peak Levels	Released: 17 July 2015; Label: Dirtee Stank; Formats: Digital download
GOAT (Greatest of All Time) (with MIK)	Released: 11 January 2016; Label: Tizzy Gang; Formats: Digital download
Catch Up Vol. 2	Released: 19 February 2016; Label: Tizzy Gang; Formats: Digital download
Catch Up Vol. 3	Released: 12 October 2016; Label: Tizzy Gang, TUIGSE; Formats: Digital download
Personality Cult	Released: 29 September 2017; Label: Tizzy Gang, TUIGSE; Formats: Digital download
Catch Up Vol. 4	Released: 3 July 2020; Label: Tizzy Gang; Formats: Digital download
Clash of the Pagans (with Capo Lee)	Released: 5 June 2020; Label: BLACC CIRC13; Formats: Free digital download

=== Singles ===
Year	Title	Album
2010	"Blue Battle Kiwi"	Non-album singles
2010	"Greaze"	Non-album singles
2011	"Shutdown" (with MIK)	Non-album singles
2012	"Eff Tizzy"	All Or Nothing
2012	"3 CDs Freestyle"	Non-album single
2015	"Cuss Match"	Peak Levels EP
2015	"El Peñol"	Catch Up Vol. 2
2015	"Polyphonic Ringtone"	Catch Up Vol. 3
2017	"Old Skool Roadman Jacket" (with Tizzy Gang)	Opps Next Door Vol. 1
2017	"Shekel" (with Tizzy Gang)	Opps Next Door Vol. 1
2017	"Opps Next Door" (with Tizzy Gang)	Opps Next Door Vol. 1
2017	"Our Queen"	Personality Cult EP
2017	"Ragu" (featuring Southside JB and Ko-Kane)	Personality Cult EP
2018	"TDF"	War is Normal
2018	"Black Hawk Down"	War is Normal
2018	"Out of Order"	War is Normal
2019	"Look Like Loubz"	Non-album single

=== As Splurt Diablo ===
==== Mixtapes and compilations ====
Title	Details
Extra Terrestrial - The Splurt Diablo Anthology	Released: 1 May 2020; Label: Tizzy Gang; Formats: Digital download
All About the Melanin	Released: 1 May 2020; Label: Tizzy Gang; Formats: Digital download
/s	Released: 3 July 2020; Label: Tizzy Gang; Formats: Digital download
Blacc	Released: 7 August 2020; Label: Tizzy Gang; Formats: Digital download

==== EPs ====
Title	Details
Vomit	Released: 1 March 2010; Label: Family Tree; Formats: Free digital download
Vomit Vol. 2	Released: 1 April 2010; Label: Family Tree; Formats: Free digital download
Vomit Vol. 3	Released: 1 May 2010; Label: Family Tree; Formats: Free digital download
J3	Released: 9 October 2013; Label: Oil Gang; Formats: Vinyl, digital download
Throwbacks	Released: 11 August 2016; Label: Self-released; Formats: Free digital download
Cyborg Justice	Released: 17 January 2017; Label: Self-released; Formats: Bandcamp-exclusive digital download
Fatigue	Released: 15 February 2017; Label: Self-released; Formats: Bandcamp-exclusive digital download
CCTV Celeb	Released: 15 March 2017; Label: Self-released; Formats: Bandcamp-exclusive digital download
Hara-Kiri	Released: 21 April 2017; Label: Self-released; Formats: Bandcamp-exclusive digital download
Space Madness	Released: 17 May 2017; Label: Self-released; Formats: Bandcamp-exclusive digital download
Amped / Irn Bru	Released: 7 May 2018; Label: Blood Frenzy; Formats: 12" vinyl

== Awards and nominations ==
Year	Nominee / work	Award	Result	Ref.
2020	Jme featuring Merky ACE - "Live"	UK Music Video Awards Best Hip Hop / Grime / Rap Video	Won	
