= Logan Sama =

British musician and Esports commentator

- Occupations: DJ, esports commentator
- Known for: Grime music, Street Fighter commentary

Logan Sama is an English Grime DJ and esports commentator from Brentwood, Essex. He has appeared regularly throughout his career on radio stations Rinse, Kiss 100 and BBC Radio 1. He also runs the record labels Adamantium Music, Earth616 and Keepin' It Grimy through which he has released projects for artists and producers across vinyl and digital formats. He also founded KeepinItGrimy, a brand entirely focused on Grime activity.

== Career ==
On June 29, 2018, he did commentary for New Japan Pro Wrestling during their CEOxNJPW: When Worlds Collide show and for All Elite Wrestling (AEW) during the Fyter Fest pre-show on June 29, 2019.

== Personal life ==
Outside of music, Logan is most known for his love of trainers. Focusing predominantly on Nike Air Maxes, his collection is very large, and he is an active member in the Sneaker Culture community. He was once personally given a pair of Off White Nike Air Max 90s by Virgil Abloh.

Logan enjoys video games, in particular the Street Fighter series. He has become a prominent member of the competitive community and regularly commentates competitive Street Fighter events across the world, often working with Femi “F-Word” Adeboye. He hosts a weekly show for Capcom UK on their Twitch and YouTube channel. He has been a commentator for some of the most prestigious events such as Capcom Cup Finals held in San Francisco, California, Red Bull Kumite and EVO. He is currently part of the semi-regular Gfinity Elite Series show as a commentator for their Street Fighter V broadcasts. Logan also organizes events for the Street Fighter community under the Winner Stays On brand. These have been held at the Red Bull Gaming Sphere and Capcom UK's London office. He is also a supporter of West Ham United F.C.

== Discography ==
=== DJ Mixes ===
Title	Details
FabricLive.83	Released: 25 September 2015; Label: Fabric; Formats: CD, vinyl, digital download
