= List of Polydor Records artists =

This is a list of artists that are, or once were, signed to Polydor Records.

== 0-9 ==
- 10cc
- The 1975 (Polydor UK / Dirty Hit)
- 2Pac (Polydor UK)
- 220 Kid
- 4 Runner (Polydor Nashville)
- +44 (Polydor UK)
- 50 Cent (Polydor UK)

== A ==
- ABBA
- Absent Minded (Polydor UK)
- Ace of Base
- Bryan Adams
- AFI (Polydor UK)
- A-ha
- A II Z (Polydor UK)
- Abd al Malik
- Peter Alexander
- Alexandros (RX-Records/Polydor Japan)
- Alizée
- Alphabeat
- Alphaville
- Alpines
- Alquin
- The All-American Rejects (Polydor UK)
- The Allman Brothers Band
- All Time Low (Polydor UK)
- María Conchita Alonso
- The Amboy Dukes
- Thomas Anders
- Lale Andersen
- Jon Anderson
- Angels and Airwaves (Polydor UK)
- Paul Anka
- Die Antwoord (Polydor UK)
- Appleton
- Army of Lovers (Polydor UK)
- Art of Noise (China/Polydor)
- Asia
- Athlete (Polydor UK)
- Atlanta Rhythm Section
- Audience
- Audioslave (Polydor UK, shared with Sony Music Entertainment)
- The Automatic
- Roy Ayers
- Ayọ
- Intan Ayu (Polydor Bandung)
- Au/Ra

== B ==
- Baby Queen
- Babymetal (Polydor UK)
- Liam Bailey
- Tony Banks (Charisma/Polydor) (US/Canada)
- Barclay James Harvest
- Gary Barlow
- Daniel Bedingfield (Polydor UK)
- The Bees
- Bee Gees (Polydor UK)
- Kenny Bee (Polydor Hong Kong)
- Belters Only
- The Big Three
- Björk (outside the UK and Iceland)
- Black Tide (Polydor UK)
- Blackpink (Polydor UK)
- Blind Faith
- Blink-182 (Polydor UK)
- Blossom Toes
- Andrea Bocelli
- Boyzone
- Brand New (Polydor UK)
- Brick and Lace
- Alicia Bridges
- Bright Eyes (Polydor UK)
- Sarah Brightman
- Ian Brown
- James Brown
- Miquel Brown
- Roy Buchanan
- Buckingham Nicks (outside Canada)
- Bucks Fizz
- Bully Buhlan
- Emma Bunton (Polydor UK)

== C ==
- Café Tacvba (UK) (Universal Music Latin)
- Carabao
- Cast
- Cat's Eyes
- Cat Mother and the All Night News Boys
- Celeste (Polydor UK)
- The Chakachas
- Priscilla Chan (Polydor Hong Kong)
- Greyson Chance (Polydor UK)
- Chapel Club
- Leslie Cheung (Polydor Hong Kong)
- Vivian Chow (Polydor Hong Kong)
- Grace Chan (Polydor Hong Kong)
- Chelsia Chan (Polydor Hong Kong)
- Eric Clapton (RSO/Bushbranch/Polydor)
- Petula Clark
- Stanley Clarke
- Shane Codd (Polydor UK)
- Cheryl Cole (Fascination/Polydor)
- Chris Cornell (Polydor UK)
- Amie Comeaux (Polydor Nashville)
- Commodores
- Billy Connolly
- Jodie Connor
- Lloyd Cole and the Commotions
- Cookie Crew
- Courteeners
- Cover Drive
- Crawlers
- Cream
- Celia Cruz
- Crystal Castles
- Rivers Cuomo (Polydor UK)
- The Cure (Fiction/Polydor) (outside US/Canada)

== D ==
- D Mob
- Daley
- Dashboard Confessional (Polydor UK)
- Davis Daniel (Polydor Nashville)
- Victoria (Polydor UK)
- Maurizio De Jorio (Polydor UK)
- Lynsey De Paul
- Bill Deal
- Deep Purple (outside US)
- Lana Del Rey (Polydor UK)
- Delays
- Delphic
- Cathy Dennis
- Esmee Denters (Polydor UK)
- Destinee & Paris (Polydor UK)
- Jim Diamond (PolyGram TV/Polydor)
- Diddy (Polydor UK)
- Dino
- Dirty White Boy
- Alesha Dixon
- Dodgy
- Plácido Domingo
- Donel
- Double
- Dr. Dre (Polydor UK)
- Dr. Vades
- Hilary Duff (Polydor UK)
- Duffy (A&M/Polydor) (outside US)
- The Duke Spirit
- Durrty Goodz (Polydor UK)

== E ==
- Eagles (Polydor UK)
- E/Eels (signed directly to Polydor US from 1992 to 1993, Polydor UK later distributed his works with Eels on behalf of DreamWorks Records)
- Billie Eilish (Polydor UK)
- Elbow (Polydor UK)
- Sophie Ellis-Bextor
- Electric Light Orchestra (Polydor UK)
- Emma's Imagination (Polydor UK)
- Emerson Lake & Powell
- Eminem (Polydor UK)
- Engine Alley (Polydor UK)
- Envy & Other Sins (Polydor UK)
- Escape The Fate (Polydor UK)
- Nathan Evans
- Paul Evans

== F ==
- Fab!
- Lara Fabian
- Fairport Convention (debut album)
- Christine Fan (Polydor France)
- Far East Movement (Polydor UK)
- Mylène Farmer (Polydor France)
- Fat Boys (Tin Pan Apple/Polydor)
- The Fatback Band
- The Fauves (Polydor Australia)
- Feist (Polydor France & UK)
- Sam Fender (Polydor UK)
- Fergie (Polydor UK)
- Sky Ferreira (Polydor UK)
- Findlay (Polydor UK)
- Fish (Polydor UK)
- Fishmans
- The Flaws
- Flint
- Florence + The Machine
- Flyleaf (Polydor UK)
- Focus (Polydor UK)
- Gemma Fox
- The Fratellis (Polydor UK)
- Friend & Lover (Verve Forecast/Polydor)
- Frl. Menke

== G ==
- G-Unit (Polydor UK)
- Rory Gallagher
- The Game (rapper, Polydor UK)
- Stephen Gately
- Gloria Gaynor
- Girls Aloud (Fascination/Polydor)
- Girls' Generation (Polydor France)
- Paul Godwin
- Golden Earring
- Calvin Goldspink
- Selena Gomez (Polydor UK)
- Ellie Goulding (Polydor UK)
- Rose Gray
- Joey Gregorash
- Clinton Gregory (Polydor Nashville)
- Skylar Grey (Polydor UK)
- Guillemots
- Gun
- Guns N' Roses (Polydor UK)
- Gwen Guthrie

== H ==
- Haircut One Hundred
- HAIM (Polydor UK)
- Lilian Harvey
- Isaac Hayes
- Hear'Say
- Helmet (Polydor UK)
- Jimi Hendrix
- The Hill
- Becky Hill
- Susumu Hirasawa (Polydor K.K.)
- Molly Hocking (Polydor UK)
- Mark Hollis (Polydor UK)
- Hollywood Undead (Polydor UK)
- Jake Holmes
- Ricky Hui (Polydor Hong Kong)
- Samuel Hui (Sam Hui) (Polydor Hong Kong)
- Hundred Reasons
- HY (ASSE!! Records/Polydor Japan)

== I ==
- Julio Iglesias
- Illit (Polydor Japan)
- Inhaler (band)
- Yosui Inoue (Polydor Japan)
- INXS (Polydor France)

== J ==
- Janet Jackson (Polydor UK)
- La Toya Jackson
- Millie Jackson
- Jagged Edge (Polydor UK)
- The Jam
- Japanese Voyeurs
- Jean Michel Jarre (Dreyfus/Polydor)
- Carly Rae Jepsen (Polydor UK)
- Calvin Jeremy (Polydor Melayu)
- Jimmy Eat World (Polydor UK)
- Elton John (US & Canada, 1990–95)
- The Jolt
- Jon and Vangelis
- Joe Jonas (Polydor UK)
- Jonas Brothers (Polydor UK)
- Jax Jones
- Tom Jones
- Oskar Joost
- Juanes (UK) (Universal Music Latin)
- Juice WRLD
- Joe Junior (Polydor Hong Kong)
- Madeline Juno

== K ==
- K'Naan (Polydor UK)
- Ronan Keating
- Toby Keith (Polydor Nashville)
- The Kelly Family
- Michael Patrick "Paddy" Kelly
- Kingdom Come
- Kitaro
- Klaxons
- Kaiser Chiefs
- Kelis (Polydor UK)
- King Crimson (E.G./Polydor)

== L ==
- L.A. Guns
- Lake (Germany)
- Lady Gaga (Polydor UK)
- Lawson (Polydor UK)
- Denny Laine
- LANY
- James Last
- Led Zeppelin (Atlantic/Polydor UK, 1969–71, switched to WEA distribution afterward)
- Lena (Polydor Germany)
- John Lennon
- Kristian Leontiou
- Level 42 (Polydor UK)
- Lighthouse Family
- Limp Bizkit (Polydor UK)
- Theo Lingen
- Little Angels
- Cher Lloyd (UMG Polydor)
- LMFAO (Polydor UK)
- Lolly
- Loreen (Polydor France)
- Demi Lovato (Polydor UK/Fascination)
- La Roux (Polydor UK, until 2014 before switching to self publishing through Supercolour Records)
- LuvBug
- Luo Shih-feng
- Lana Del Rey

== M ==
- Mabel (Polydor UK)
- The Maccabees
- Madeon (Polydor UK)
- Madonna (Polydor UK)
- Maestro Fresh Wes
- Sidney Magal
- Magnum
- Clare Maguire
- Tim Maia
- The Main Ingredient
- Yngwie Malmsteen (Polydor Japan/Polydor US)
- Mandrill
- Man Parrish
- Manfred Mann's Earth Band
- Marilyn Manson (Polydor UK)
- Benny Mardones
- Maroon 5 (Polydor UK)
- Lee Mead (Fascination/Polydor)
- Melissa Mars
- Masterboy
- Lutricia McNeal
- Medal
- Maximum Balloon (Polydor UK)
- Meiko (Polydor UK)
- M.I.A.
- George Michael (Ægean/Polydor UK)
- Julia Michaels (UK)
- Mindless Behavior (Polydor UK)
- Minor Detail
- Missouri
- Modestep
- The Moffatts (Polydor Nashville)
- Monaco
- Larissa Mondrus (Polydor Germany)
- James Morrison
- Van Morrison
- Nana Mouskouri
- Moxy (Polydor of Canada)
- Elliott Murphy
- Keith O'Conner Murphy (with Keith Murphy & The Daze)
- The Moody Blues (Threshold/Polydor)
- Tim Moore
- Samantha Mumba
- Mungo Jerry
- Music for Pleasure
- The Music
- MSTRKRFT
- Mýa (Polydor UK)

== N ==
- Akina Nakamori (Polydor Japan/Utahime Records)
- The Naked & Famous
- Natalia Kills (Polydor UK)
- Nelly Furtado (Polydor UK)
- Nelson (Polydor UK, distribution of DGC/Geffen-era releases)
- Jesy Nelson
- N.E.R.D. (Polydor UK)
- The New Seekers
- Paul Nicholas
- Nine Inch Nails (Polydor UK)
- Nino Bravo
- Nirvana (Polydor UK)
- No Angels
- No Doubt (Polydor UK)
- N-Dubz (left 2008)
- Nimco Happy

== O ==
- Ruti Olajugbagbe
- OneRepublic (Polydor UK)
- Yoko Ono
- Orange Juice
- Orianthi (Polydor UK)
- The Osmonds
- Donny Osmond (Kolob/Polydor; transferred from MGM)
- Marie Osmond (Kolob/Polydor; transferred from MGM)
- Donny & Marie Osmond (Kolob/Polydor; transferred from MGM)
- Os Mutantes (Polydor Brazil)
- Outrage (Polydor Japan)

== P ==
- Nerina Pallot
- Papa Roach (Polydor UK)
- Alex Parks
- Peaches & Herb
- Les Penning
- Perfume (Perfume Records/Polydor Japan)
- Peter Marsh
- Physical Graffiti
- The Pierces
- Pink Fairies
- PLAVE (VLAST/Polydor Japan)
- The Police (Polydor UK)
- Cole Porter
- Powderfinger
- The Pretty Reckless (Polydor UK)
- Protocol
- Puddle of Mudd (Polydor UK)
- Pussycat Dolls (Polydor UK)
- P-Model

== Q ==
- Queens of the Stone Age (Polydor UK)
- Quicksand
- Freddy Quinn (Polydor Germany)

== R ==
- Rainbow (Oyster/Polydor)
- Ramz
- Rare Bird
- Raye (Polydor UK, left in 2021)
- Don Ray
- RD (Ruff Diamondz)
- Reparata
- Otto Reutter
- Return to Forever
- Rev Theory (Polydor UK)
- Rise Against (Polydor UK)
- Nicola Roberts
- Teddy Robin (Polydor Hong Kong)
- Robot Boy
- Olivia Rodrigo (Polydor UK)
- The Rolling Stones
- Romance

== S ==
- Sad Café
- Saga
- Saraya
- Stefflon Don (54 London/Quality Control/Polydor UK)
- The Saturdays (Fascination/Polydor)
- The Savage Rose
- Scars on Broadway (Polydor UK)
- Scissor Sisters
- S Club 7
- S Club 8
- Nicole Scherzinger (Polydor UK)
- Rudi Schuricke
- Tony Scott
- Sea Girls (Polydor UK)
- Sea Stories (Polydor Australia)
- Semi Precious Weapons (Polydor UK)
- Sensations Fix
- Shakatak
- Sham 69
- Rocky Sharpe and the Replays
- Neil Sedaka (Polydor UK, Polydor Canada)
- Shed Seven
- Shocking Blue
- Shoes (U.S.-band)
- Shystie
- Jagjit Singh
- Siouxsie and the Banshees (original recording label)
- Slade
- Smiley Culture (Polydor UK)
- Snow Patrol
- Sonic Youth (Polydor UK)
- Soraya
- Soundgarden (Polydor UK)
- Spitz (Polydor Japan)
- Spyro Gyra
- Ringo Starr (Polydor UK)
- Gwen Stefani (Polydor UK)
- Cat Stevens (a.k.a. Yusuf Islam)
- Rachel Stevens
- Street Drum Corps (Polydor UK)
- Amy Studt
- Christina Stürmer
- The Style Council
- Sugababes (the original line-up)
- Swedish House Mafia
- The Sweet
- Sweet Connection

== T ==
- Take That (Polydor UK)
- Talk Talk (Verve/Polydor UK)
- James Taylor Quartet
- Tee-Set
- Ten Wheel Drive
- Teresa Teng
- Tesla (Polydor UK, distribution of Geffen-era releases)
- Therapy? (Polydor UK)
- Timbaland (Polydor UK)
- Toots Thielemans
- Thriller U
- A Thousand Points of Night
- The Tigers (Polydor Japan)
- Tonic
- Tove Lo (Polydor UK)
- Traffic
- Tired Pony
- Truth Hurts (Polydor UK)
- Turbo B
- Totally Enormous Extinct Dinosaurs
- TV on the Radio (Polydor UK)
- TYP
- Taste (Irish band)

== U ==
- U2
- U.K.
- Underground Lovers (Polydor Australia)

== V ==
- Dave Van Ronk
- Vangelis
- Van Halen (Polydor UK)
- The Velvet Underground
- Miklós Vig
- Visage

== W ==
- Rufus Wainwright (Polydor UK)
- The Waitresses
- Claire Waldoff
- Wale (Polydor UK)
- Albertina Walker (Polydor Gospel Series)
- The Wallflowers (Polydor UK)
- Walk This Way (band)
- Waterfront
- Marti Webb
- Weezer (Polydor UK)
- Tony Joe White
- Vanessa White (Polydor UK)
- White Lies (Polydor UK)
- The Who (original recording label)
- The Wild Magnolias
- Ulla Wiesner (Germany)
- will.i.am (Polydor UK)
- Tony Williams
- Wolfmother
- World Trade
- Patrick Wolf
- Link Wray
- Chely Wright (Polydor Nashville)
- Warning (Polydor France)

== X ==
- X-Clan
- X Japan
- XO
- Xutos & Pontapés
- Xavion

== Y ==
- Yeah Yeah Yeahs
- Years & Years
- Yelawolf (Polydor UK)
- Yorushika (Polydor JP)
- YU-KA (Polydor JP)
- Yuksek
- Yungblud (Polydor UK)

== Z ==
- Zucchero
