= FabricLive.88 =

Compilation album by Flava D
- Released: 15 July 2016
- Genres: UK Garage, bassline, grime
- Length: 1:16:32
- Label: Fabric

FabricLive chronology
FabricLive.87 (2016)	FabricLive.88 (2016)	FabricLive.89 (2016)

Professional ratings
Review scores
Source	Rating
Resident Advisor	3.5/5 stars

FabricLive.88 is a DJ mix album by English DJ Flava D. The album was released as the eighty-eighth album in the FabricLive Mix Series.

== Track listing ==
No.	Title	Length
1.	"Intro"	5:01
2.	"Whistler"	2:26
3.	"Conflict" (featuring Taiki Nulight)	2:25
4.	"Dem Tings Dere" (featuring Riddim Commission, D Double E)	1:49
5.	"Gunshot" (featuring Champion)	1:49
6.	"Closer" (featuring Miss Fire)	1:56
7.	"Bleeding"	3:08
8.	"Crooks VIP" (featuring Majestic)	2:27
9.	"Wheels"	1:40
10.	"Like This" (featuring D Double E)	1:55
11.	"Flavor" (featuring DJ Q)	2:23
12.	"Hold On"	2:23
13.	"What I like (DJ Q remix)" (featuring Moksi, DJ Q)	2:23
14.	"Soul Shake" (featuring My Nu Leng)	2:51
15.	"Mad Ting (Flava D remix)" (featuring Swindle)	2:22
16.	"Gun Down" (featuring DevelopMENT)	2:50
17.	"Revenge" (featuring Royal-T, Deadbeat UK)	1:56
18.	"Changed My Way"	1:40
19.	"Glow" (featuring Glow)	1:55
20.	"Happy" (featuring Miss Fire)	3:01
21.	"Section Request" (featuring Holy Goof)	3:20
22.	"Dollar Sign (Juicy Patty Riddim)" (featuring Teror Danjah, Stush, Sticky)	1:40
23.	"In The Dance VIP"	2:37
24.	"Off The Chain" (featuring Distro)	1:26
25.	"Kill Alla Dem" (featuring Champion, Slick Don)	3:08
26.	"To My Heart" (featuring TuffCulture)	3:38
27.	"Clarity"	1:55
28.	"Motions"	3:50
29.	"Only One" (featuring TQD)	2:53
30.	"Searching"	3:32
