= Terror Danjah =

English grime DJ/producer

- Born: Rodney Joseph Pryce; 17 August 1979; Newham, London, England
- Origin: Forest Gate, London, England
- Died: 10 February 2025 (aged 45)
- Genres: Grime; UK garage; jungle; drum and bass; hip-hop; dubstep
- Occupations: Record producer; DJ; songwriter; music executive
- Years active: 1990s–2019
- Labels: Solid City Records; East Iz East; Aftershock; Hardrive; Planet Mu; Butterz; Hyperdub; Tru Thoughts
- Formerly of: Bass Inject; Reckless Crew; Highly Flammable; Nasty Crew; Aftershock; Beatcamp

Rodney Joseph Pryce (17 August 1979 – 10 February 2025), better known by his stage name Terror Danjah, was an English record producer, DJ, songwriter and label manager from Forest Gate, London. As the co-founder of the grime record label and musical collective Aftershock, he hosted BBC Radio 1Xtra's UKG M1X Show on a fortnightly basis between 2004 and 2006 alongside the likes of Scratcha DVA and Bruza, and was an early mentor to Tinie Tempah and Mz. Bratt. Over the course of his career he produced songs of various genres including grime, jungle and hip-hop, and collaborated with many charting artists including Wiley, Chip, Kano and Kelela. As he was among the first grime producers to work with a multitude of singers, many cultural commentators consider him a pioneer of the rhythm and grime style.

== Early life ==
Pryce was born to Jamaican parents. He started DJing around the age of eleven, and attended St Bonaventure's secondary school in Forest Gate alongside fellow Nasty Crew members including D Double E. He attended the same sixth form college as Bruza in 1996 and went on to study a course in sound engineering.

== Musical style ==
Pryce was raised on soca, ska, reggae, rare groove, R&B, soul and early deep house, and developed a taste for hip-hop, dancehall and jungle music as he got older, citing Buju Banton, Timbaland, Roni Size and sound system culture among the formative influences on his own sound. Specific sounds and pirate radio stations that "heavily influenced" him included Saxon, Coxsone Sound, Station FM, Ragga FM, and Kool FM. In drum and bass, his inspirations included the productions of Dillinja, Shy FX and Krust. His producer tag was a distorted sound effect known as the "gremlin" laugh, taken from a drum and bass sample CD, which later became the namesake of his 2009 compilation album Gremlinz. He produced music using various digital audio workstations over the course of his career including Cubase, Logic Pro and Pro Tools.

Multiple music journalists have commended Pryce's spatial arrangements in his music; he credited his intuition in "layering sounds and placing sounds" to being a close listener of Roni Size and Andy C. Reviewing his 2004 EP Industry Standard for The Wire, Simon Reynolds also observed Pryce's use of "intricate syncopation [and] texturised beats" combined with an "atmosphere of domineering darkness." For Rip It Up, Martyn Pepperell noted how in Pryce's 2010 debut album Undeniable, "crunchy eight-bit noises orbit around G-funk referencing melodies, incidental sounds fade in and out of existence, and a rare balance between experimentalism and accessibility is achieved."

Writing for the Guardian in 2012, Sam Richards described Pryce's sound as "plush post-grime". In the same vein, The Quietus writer Rory Gibb contrasted Pryce's style with "the relatively simple, blocky construction of many grime instrumentals", praising how his "beats are slippery and difficult to predict, each drum hit splintering outwards into a series of secondary fragments" and "melodies [...] arise from the interactions of many much smaller slivers of synth." He also noted Pryce's fusion of jungle's "penchant for perpetual motion" with "the slinky melodies and pop nous of late 90s/early 00s R&B". Pitchfork writer Jazz Monroe summarised his sound as "tactile beats and cartoonish, neon-lined flourishes", and Resident Advisor editor Andrew Ryce similarly noted his music's "taut balance between cartoonish and violent", while Hyperdub founder Kode9 remembered him as a "a musical trickster", whose songs were "always twisting and turning, wriggling around, setting little decoys, only to switch direction while leaving a little trap door open for you to fall through". Music editors at The Guardian described Pryce in an obituary as "much admired for his lush, playful and propulsive style of production".

== Career ==
=== 1990s–2001: Jungle origins, Bass Inject and Reckless Crew ===
In his youth, Pryce would DJ at house parties and youth clubs, where he would participate in impromptu sound clashes against other DJs. He initially played ragga music, and began listening to jungle in late 1992; by the mid-1990s, he was performing as a member of the crew Bass Inject alongside D Double E (then known as DJ Dan) and DJ Tempo. Their early pirate radio appearances, starting in 1996, included stints on Raw FM (later known as Raw Mission) and Future FM. Pryce began producing his own instrumentals because he wanted to be able to play unreleased drum and bass songs in his sets and was unable to procure many dubplates from well-known artists. Early champions of his music included DJ Zinc and, according to Sian Anderson, his earliest known song was an untitled jungle collaboration with Prizna in 1997. In 1998, he formed the group Reckless Crew, joined by D Double E, Bruza (then known as Chigga D), Hitman Hyper, Funsta, Triple Threat (then known as MC Lethal), DJ Interlude, and Mayhem. The crew later secured a residency on Rinse FM, which aided them in attracting nightclub bookings. He began playing at One Nation events around 1999, and considered playing a set alongside Skibadee and Shabba D to be a defining moment in his early career.

=== 2001–2002: Breakthrough in garage, Highly Flammable and Nasty Crew ===
During the rise of UK garage in the British mainstream at the turn of the millennium, Pryce did not consider himself a fan of the genre, but was convinced by a musical friend called Looney to try producing garage on the side due to a perceived decline in jungle's popularity. These efforts immediately proved more fruitful than his drum and bass songs: in 2001, he remixed his own song "We Told U" into a garage track and pitched it to Dreem Teem's record label in hopes of a record deal. Timmi Magic chose not to sign the song, but it was nonetheless played "for twelve weeks straight" on the group's daytime BBC Radio 1 show. The first two garage songs he ever produced were both played by Rinse FM co-founder DJ Slimzee, and the third, 2002's "Highly Flammable", was signed to Teebone's label Solid City, associated with the output of prominent crew Pay As U Go. This inspired the formation of a short-lived garage crew also named Highly Flammable. Pryce was simultaneously invited into pioneering local collective Nasty Crew, and released the instrumental single "We Are the Worst" via East Iz East in 2002, credited to both crews.

=== 2002–2008: Aftershock era and BBC Radio 1Xtra show ===
While frequenting cutting plant Music House to press his records to vinyl, Pryce was mentored by Paul Chue, a staff member, roots reggae producer, and the father of Wookie. Chue advised Pryce to team up with aspiring music businessman and East Iz East label executive Flash to advance their careers together, due to their mutual interest in a sound branching off from garage which would later become known as grime. The pair established Aftershock Records in late 2002, which initially served solely as a record label and primary released music via the medium of vinyl. The first release was "We Told U" in 2002, with a limited run of 100 white label records. Pryce executive produced some of the label's first records, successfully convincing MCs to vocal instrumentals produced by childhood friends like D.O.K. He also headed up the label's PR.

Pryce produced Nasty Crew's September 2003 single "Cock Back", released via Aftershock, which saw Hitman Hyper and D Double E joined by guests Crazy Titch and Riko Dan. Created in January 2003, the instrumental sampled the Jamaican cult classic film Shottas. The vocal version was picked as the 'Power Play' on Deja Vu FM and topped the sales chart at specialist London record store Rhythm Division; Pryce has claimed it sold around 10,000 copies in total. Other underground hits he produced around this time included Bruza's "Bruzin" (featuring Footsie, Triple Threat and Shizzle) and various pioneering songs within the rhythm and grime style, including Sadie Ama's "So Sure" (featuring Kano), his remix of Shaznay Lewis's "You" alongside Scratcha DVA and Klashnekoff, and his own single "Love Is Here to Stay" (featuring Katie Pearl and Kano), which was remixed by Skepta. Pryce also doubled up as a songwriter, penning lyrics for the singers he worked with, including parts of "So Sure"; the song's success led to profiles in Mixmag, DJ Mag, Kmag and i-D. In 2004, he also released the instrumental EP Industry Standard via Aftershock, which included the well-known song "Creepy Crawler", and contributed to the various artist remix EP Payback, reportedly "one of Aftershock's top sellers". Wiley recorded a vocal version of "Creepy Crawler" titled "Take Chances", which was released via XL Recordings in 2004 as the B-side to his single "Pies".

In 2004, Pryce and DVA joined BBC Radio 1Xtra as fortnightly hosts of the UKG M1X Show, a late show on Friday nights from 2-6am, alternating weeks with DJ Q. Shows would typically open with 30 minutes of R&G productions, followed by MC-led songs, with Triple Threat and Bruza, both formerly of Reckless Crew, joining as the group's first MCs. The two MCs each assembled their own subgroups of Aftershock—Tha Lordz and The Hooligans respectively—with the intention of developing the careers of younger MCs. In 2006, both divisions released their own albums direct-to-consumer on compact disc via the crew's official website: Tha Lordz' House of Lordz Vol. 1, released in July, featured members Triple Threat, Specs, Royal, Krucial and Cyclone, while The Hooligans' It's Coming Home, released in December, featured members Bruza, Tinie Tempah and D Dark. Pryce contributed productions to both albums. The group's 1Xtra show ended in 2006.

The Aftershock collective came together as a whole to release its first and only album, Shock to the System, in March 2007, which included nineteen tracks recorded between 2005 and 2006. Various new members joined the crew during the process of recording the project, including Loudmouth Melvin, who brought his UK hip hop style to grime, Mz Bratt, who Pryce scouted via Myspace and open mic nights, and Youf, who was introduced through his brother. However, Pryce's 2008 mixtape Hardrive, which featured collaborations with various guests, proved more popular than Shock to the System. He departed from the group and established a new independent label, Hardrive, later claiming that Aftershock "was supposed to just be a label" and "when it started to go the way of being a big crew, it got messy" with "a whole heap of people trying to use the name to do their thing".

=== 2008–2011: Gremlinz compilation, debut album Undeniable and critical acclaim ===
In the late 2000s and early 2010s, Pryce leaned into a renewed public interest in instrumental and club-oriented grime music, reaching a wider audience of electronic music fans when independent label Planet Mu released a retrospective compilation of his instrumental songs called Gremlinz in 2009. It was named by The Independent as their album of the week, with Rahul Verma writing that "Danjah's urgent, polished production — and cheekiness — dazzle". As a companion to its release, he revived his Industry Standard series with a fourth vinyl EP, this time on Planet Mu and featuring four previously unreleased songs. He also released the Zip Files mixtape later that year. In March 2010, he released the Bipolar EP, the first release on Elijah and Skilliam's label Butterz, and shared the stem parts for both songs via Elijah's blog so that listeners could create their own remixes. Pryce also shared Hardrumentals, a ZIP file for free download containing twenty previously unreleased instrumentals, in 2010 before releasing his debut solo album, Undeniable, in November 2010 via Kode9's experimental electronic label Hyperdub. The album featured guest appearances from D Double E, Griminal and Lauren Mason among others, and was noted for its incorporation of pop and house music influences into dubstep and grime, attracting praise from Resident Advisor, The Independent and the BBC. It was followed by a non-album single in 2011, "Full Attention" featuring Ruby Lee Ryder, which was released via Hardrive and supported on specialist radio. Butterz and Hardrive often co-organised club nights at Club Cable during this time, one of which was named by The Independent as a 'clubs highlight'.

=== 2011–2014: Dark Crawler, Champion and Four Tet collaborations ===
In November 2011, Pryce began the campaign for his second solo album on Hyperdub, releasing the lead single "You Make Me Feel" featuring Meleka. The album's name was revealed to be Dark Crawler, and its second single and title track featuring Riko Dan was released in May 2012. In September 2012, he released the album, which included a mixture of heavier, MC-led songs and softer collaborations with singers. In total, the title track "Dark Crawler" appeared five times on the album in different forms, with West Midlands MCs Deadly, Mayhem and SafOne and London MCs Trim and Kozzie also contributing vocal versions. Its name harks back to Pryce's 2003 instrumental "Creepy Crawler", which he re-released for free download to promote the new project. Pryce embarked on a tour to coincide with the album's release, which included a date at Manchester's Mint Lounge accompanied by Riko Dan.

The following year, he curated the compilation album Hardwired, featuring various sought-after productions including a collaboration with Zed Bias from 2011, a FaltyDL remix of his 2007 song "Zumpi Hunter", and a Kode9 song from 2006. In June 2013, he collaborated with Champion on the Hyperdub EP Sons of Anarchy, which peaked at number 93 on the UK Physical Singles Chart. In 2014, he collaborated with Four Tet on the double single "Killer"/"Nasty" to critical acclaim.

=== 2014–2019: The Planets, Beatcamp and Hardrive releases ===
Pryce shared during a 2015 UKF interview that he had been "taking time out for personal reasons", marking his return by contributing the P Jam collaboration "Crud" to Logan Sama's FabricLive.83 mix CD and performing a DJ set at its launch event. The same year, he formed the instrumental grime production crew and label Beatcamp alongside Dexplicit, P Jam, D.O.K, Champion and Rocks FOE, and was among three members of the group to appear on Sama's 1Xtra show for a guest mix. In 2016, he self-released the solo concept album The Planets via Hardrive as well as a three-instalment compilation of early material previously unavailable digitally—the Lost Mini Discs—and the various-artist Dancehall Grime Starter Pack EP, offering grime interpretations of songs by Buju Banton and Vybz Kartel. He also released the single "Juicy Patty", featuring former Roll Deep member Jamakabi, via Dusk + Blackdown's Keysound label. The song peaked at number 94 on the UK Physical Singles Chart. The following year, he celebrated ten years of his popular "Zumpi Hunter" instrumental by releasing a 'version excursion' consisting of thirteen versions of the song, including vocal versions by Wiley, Teddy Bruckshot and Maxwell D. He was an additional producer on the Kelela single "Blue Light", which appeared on her 2017 debut album Take Me Apart.

=== 2019–2025: Fourth album Invasion, ill health and death ===
In April 2019, Pryce self-released the Red Flag EP via Hardrive. In July, he announced that he had signed his fourth solo album Invasion to British independent label Tru Thoughts for a September release, and shared its lead single "Module". On 20 August, the album's second single, "Scene 1" featuring Nii-Teiko, was re-released, having appeared on the pair's collaborative Hardrive EP The Scene Vol. 1 the previous year. A week later on 26 August, news broke online that Pryce had been entered into an induced coma, with DJ Sticky subsequently sharing two statements from the mother of Pryce's children via Twitter. Invasion was released on 13 September, and Tru Thoughts co-owner Robert Luis released a statement announcing that the label's share of recording and publishing royalties generated by the album would be given in full to Pryce to support him in his ill health. Writing for The Arts Desk, Joe Muggs awarded the album five stars, complimenting how it borrowed elements from bashment, trap, techno and metal while operating within the confines of grime's 140 beats per minute. Pryce woke from the coma and subsequently returned to Twitter in early 2020, claiming in May that he needed new kidneys, had undergone "long" and "tough" health treatments including kidney dialysis, and was in the process of regaining his speech. On the evening of 10 February 2025, former Deja Vu FM co-owner D-Power Diesle announced that Pryce had died.

== Discography ==
=== Albums ===
- Undeniable (Hyperdub, 2010)
- Dark Crawler (Hyperdub, 2012)
- The Planets (Hardrive, 2016)
- Invasion (Tru Thoughts, 2019)

=== Mixtapes ===
- Hardrive Vol. 1 (Hardrive, 2008)
- The Zip Files (Hardrive, 2009)

=== Compilation albums ===
- Gremlinz (The Instrumentals 2003-2009) (Planet Mu, 2009)
- Lost Mini Discs (Hardrive, 2016)
- Lost Mini Discs 2 (Hardrive, 2016)
- Lost Mini Discs 3 (Hardrive, 2016)
