= Gemma Fox =

- Origin: North London, England
- Genres: R&B, hip hop, UK garage, bassline, rhythm & grime
- Years active: 2003–present
- Labels: Polydor: 2002–2004; Gut 2008–2009 ((New State)) ((Night bass)) ((Happy Records)) ((BMG)) ((Fox Ents)) ((Concord Publishing)), ((BMG)).
- Formerly of: Aftershock

Gemma Fox is an English, R&B and hip hop Grime Bassline singer and songwriter Record Label owner Consultancy owner & DJ. Also known as the Original Queen of Bassline, 1st lady of the Genre. Best known for her 2004 album Messy. The lead single, "Girlfriend's Story", was released in April of that year and featured MC Lyte. The second single, "Gone", featured Juelz Santana. Fox left her label Polydor Records in August 2004. She was a member of the collective Aftershock alongside Terror Danjah, Mz Bratt, Bruza, Triple Threat, Elrae, D-E-Velopment, Badness, and 2Nice. The collective was formed in 2003.

Fox won a UMA Urban Music Award and was nominated for a MOBO Award in 2004.

Gemma holds two Official UK Top 40 hits (#8 and #38).

Awake hit #2 on the Music Week Upfront Chart.

Sammy Virji supports USA's Hans Glader & Gemmas Track Operator on Radio 1

Fox appears on her radio show on Pure FM last Fridays of the month 10pm to 11pm.

With independent label ((Fox Music Records)) and her Consultancy (( Fox Music Consultancy)) Gemma has been releasing music on her own label and has recently signed a distribution deal with ((Xelon))

Gemma is the official Song writer for The House and Garage Orchestra.

Gemma is writing internationally

== Discography ==
=== Albums ===
- Messy (2004)

=== Singles ===
Year	Single	UK
2004	"Girlfriend's Story"	38
2004	"Gone"	—
2006	—	
2006	"Might Be" (with Dexplicit)	—

"Boxers" Delinquents

Boxers Shaun Dean

Gone Featuring Juelz Santana & J2K

Girlfriends Story Featuring MC Lyte

So Messy Paleface

Gone Delinquents remix

Operator Hans Glader

Veins Shapes

Awake. Happy Records
