= Aftershock (group) =

English grime music collective

- Origin: London, England
- Genres: Grime; UK hip hop
- Years active: 2002–2008
- Labels: Aftershock Records
- Past members: Terror Danjah; Magnum Force; D.O.K.; Big E-D; Bruza; Triple Threat; Scratcha DVA; Royal; Krucial; Cyclone; J Seeza; DJ Capa; Specs; Tinie Tempah; D Dark; S-Kid; Elrae; DJ Illness; Sir Spyro; Mz. Bratt; Devilman; Gemma Fox; Badness; 2NICE; Loudmouth Melvin; Youf; Joci; Redz

Aftershock was a British grime collective and record label founded by DJ/producer Terror Danjah and label manager Flash in 2002 and primarily based in London. The collective included a variety of MCs, singers and record producers, with 26 members at its peak, who contributed in smaller numbers to individual songs. Two "divisions" of the crew, the Aftershock Lordz and Aftershock Hooligans, showcased younger members of the group, led by original members Triple Threat and Bruza respectively.

Several members of Aftershock are recognised as pioneers of the rhythm and grime (R&G) subgenre, spotlighted through the softer productions of Terror Danjah and Scratcha DVA and the R&B-inspired vocals of members Gemma Fox and Elrae and close collaborators Shola and Sadie Ama.

The crew hosted the four-hour UKG M1X Show on BBC Radio 1Xtra fortnightly between 2004 and 2006 and later released one studio album, Shock to the System, in 2007. It dispersed after Terror Danjah split from the group and took a hiatus from music in 2008. Several of its members subsequently found solo success in the United Kingdom, including Tinie Tempah, who has topped the UK Singles Chart seven times and earned multiple platinum certifications, and Mz Bratt, who had a UK top 40 single with the Children in Need 2011 charity cover version of Massive Attack's "Teardrop". Sir Spyro followed Terror Danjah and Scratcha DVA's path in becoming a BBC Radio 1Xtra presenter and Specs Gonzalez found success as a media personality.

== History ==
=== 2002–05: Record label formation and 1Xtra show ===
In 2001, DJ/producer Terror Danjah remixed his own song "We Told U", simplifying the drum arrangement to appeal to a UK garage audience, and pitched it to Dreem Teem's label in hopes of a record deal. Timmi Magic chose not to sign the song, but it was nonetheless played "for twelve weeks straight" on the group's daytime BBC Radio 1 show. While frequenting cutting plant Music House to press his records to vinyl, Terror Danjah befriended staff member and roots reggae producer Paul Chue, who later suggested that he team up with aspiring music businessman Flash to advance their careers together. The pair were already acquainted, with Flash having been involved in the label East Iz East, through which Terror Danjah had released the Nasty Crew-affiliated single "We Are the Worst" in 2002. The two of them set up Aftershock Records the same year, which initially served solely as a record label and primary released music via the medium of vinyl. The first release was "We Told U" in 2002, with a limited run of 100 white label records.

Terror Danjah executive produced some of the label's first records, successfully convincing MCs to vocal instrumentals produced by childhood friends like D.O.K. From the label's second release onwards, he printed colour labels with logos on each record, investing in a brand identity that he felt set him apart from the plain white-labels used by prominent artists like Wiley. Early releases included underground hits such as Crazy Titch's 2003 single "I Can C U, U Can C Me (Say My Name, Crazy T)", Nasty Crew's 2003 single "Cock Back" featuring Titch and Riko Dan, Big E-D's 2003 single "Frontline" featuring D Double E, and Bruza's 2004 singles "Bruzin'" and "Get Me". Terror Danjah has claimed the release of "Cock Back" was a defining moment in the label's trajectory, topping the sales chart at specialist record store Rhythm Division and earning a coveted editorial spot as the 'Power Play' on Deja Vu FM, with vinyl sales totalling around 10,000 copies. The label also released fully instrumental bodies of work, including Terror Danjah's breakthrough EP Industry Standard and the 2004 various artist remix EP Payback, reportedly "one of Aftershock's top sellers".

While appearing on Richie 'ViBE' Vee's BBC Radio 1Xtra show in early 2004 alongside Bruza, Triple Threat and D Double E, Terror Danjah told listeners that the label was "filling a gap in the market [...] The soul and the streets. Getting all the vocals—the grime, the R&B, the hip-hop—and merge it on this garage tempo and make it a new flavour." He also announced that Aftershock would be teaming up with producer Big E-D to establish a second label, Frontline Records, with Demon's single "Gangsta Toyz" featuring Kano to serve as its first release. Later that year, Terror Danjah and Scratcha DVA (billed as Aftershock) began presenting their own 'UKG M1X Show' on 1Xtra, a fortnightly late show on Friday nights, alternating weeks with DJ Q. Shows would typically open with 30 minutes of R&G productions, followed by MC-led songs, with Bruza and Triple Threat, both trusted collaborators from the former jungle group Reckless Crew, joining as the group's first MCs. Guests included Shola Ama, Sway and Roll Deep and as of 2005 their slot was four hours long, from 2-6am. The show ended in 2006, and Scratcha left the crew the same year due to feeling overshadowed.

=== 2005–2008: Tha Lordz, The Hooligans and Shock to the System ===
In keeping with rival crews' introductions of subsets of "youngers" into their ranks, original members Triple Threat and Bruza each assembled their own subgroups of Aftershock—Tha Lordz and The Hooligans respectively—with the intention of developing the careers of younger MCs. Tha Lordz formed first in 2003, debuting with an appearance on Ras Kwame's 1Xtra show. D Dark and Tinie Tempah became the first members of The Hooligans at the invitation of Bruza, having made names for themselves via Myspace and pirate stations such as Axe FM, Hav It FM, Raw Mission and Blaze 99.9 FM. Tinie had also previously collaborated with Aftershock Lordz member Royal. The Hooligans appeared collectively on a remix of Bruza's December 2005 single "Doin' Me", featured as a B-side on the vinyl release. The remix appeared on his album of the same name, Doin' Me, released via Aftershock in early 2006 on CD. Both divisions released their own albums direct-to-consumer on CD in 2006 via the crew's official website. Tha Lordz' House of Lordz Vol. 1, released 10 July 2006, featured members Triple Threat, Specs, Royal, Krucial and Cyclone, and was given four stars in a review by RWD Magazine editor Danny Walker. Original members of Aftershock Lordz, J Seeza and Kast, were released from the group before this due to creative differences with Aftershock hierarchy and concerns Tha Lordz had too many members. The Hooligans' It's Coming Home, released 7 December 2006 included multiple vocal versions of Tinie's single "Wifey", which had become a hit on Channel U, spending ten weeks at the top of the channel's requests chart. Also featured on the album was a remix of Kano's "Signs in Life".

The Aftershock collective came together as a whole to release its first and only album, Shock to the System, on 26 March 2007, which included nineteen tracks recorded between 2005 and 2006. Various new members joined the crew during the process of recording the project, including Loudmouth Melvin, who brought his UK hip hop style to grime, Mz Bratt, who Terror Danjah scouted via Myspace and open mic nights,, the late 2NICE, who had previously been affiliated with garage crew The Untouchables, and Youf, who was introduced through his brother. An album launch show took place at a Dirty Canvas night at the Institute of Contemporary Arts. Two of its tracks, Gemma Fox's "Let Feelings Grow" and Elrae's "Raeman", were retrospectively listed by Fact in 2014 among the "25 greatest r’n’g tracks". At the time, Terror Danjah described the record as "something like a Soul II Soul album, but for 2007. Different styles, different artists and people talking about what’s happening in our society." He retrospectively expressed disappointment with the album's performance, claiming that "too much money was spent on the wrong things" and his solo Hardrive mixtape released in 2008 "had a better response". He left Aftershock and took a hiatus from music that same year. The group appeared twice on Tim Westwood's 1Xtra show in 2008, on 13 January and 10 August, with Sir Spyro assuming DJ duties on the latter occasion. Terror Danjah later reflected that the accessibility of the CD format compared to vinyl partially explained the label's "dwindling" success in the latter part of the decade, with a lower barrier to self-releasing music and more competitor labels emerging. He also claimed in 2012 that Aftershock "was supposed to just be a label" and "when it started to go the way of being a big crew, it got messy" with "a whole heap of people trying to use the name to do their thing".

== Discography ==
=== Albums ===
Title	Details	Featured members
House of Lordz Vol. 1 (Aftershock presents Tha Lordz)	Released: 10 July 2006; Label: Aftershock; Formats: CD, digital download	Terror Danjah, D.O.K., Magnum Force, DJ Capa, Triple Threat, Specs, Royal, Krucial, Cyclone, Bruza, Tinie Tempah, Badness, Devilman, Elrae, 2NICE, Mz Bratt
It's Coming Home (The Hooligans)	Released: 7 December 2006; Label: Aftershock; Formats: CD, digital download	Terror Danjah, D.O.K., Magnum Force, D Dark, Bruza, Tinie Tempah, Royal, Krucial, Triple Threat, Gemma Fox, Elrae
Shock to the System	Released: 26 March 2007; Label: Aftershock; Formats: CD, digital download	Terror Danjah, D.O.K., Magnum Force, Triple Threat, Royal, Bruza, Elrae, Devilman, Tinie Tempah, Loudmouth Melvin, Youf, Mz Bratt, Badness, Krucial, Gemma Fox, D Dark, Redz, Specs, 2NICE, Joci

=== Mixtapes ===
Title	Details	Featured members
Shockin' Mixtape Vol. 1	Released: 2005; Label: Aftershock; Formats: CD	Terror Danjah, D.O.K., Magnum Force, Bruza, Elrae, Krucial, Royal, Triple Threat

=== EPs ===
Title	Details	Featured members
Roadsweeper	Released: January 2005; Label: Aftershock; Formats: 12" vinyl	Terror Danjah, D.O.K., Magnum Force, Big E-D
Zumpi Central	Released: April 2007; Label: Pirate Sessions Recordings; Formats: 12" vinyl	Terror Danjah, Sir Spyro, D.O.K.

=== Singles ===
Year	Title	Featured members
2004	"With U" (featuring Shola Ama)	Terror Danjah
2005	"Not Convinced" (featuring Bruza, Shizzle, Napper and Fumin)	Terror Danjah, Bruza

=== Guest appearances ===
Year	Title	Album	Featured members
2005	"Doin' Me (Remix)" (Bruza featuring The Hooligans)	Doin' Me	Tinie Tempah, S-Kid, D Dark, Elrae
