= Teddy Bruckshot =

Teddy Bruckshot may refer to:

- An alias used by English MC Stormin (1984–2018)
- Teddy Bruck Shut, a fictional character in the 2002 film Shottas
