= N.A.S.T.Y. =

N.A.S.T.Y. may refer to:

- N.A.S.T.Y. Crew, short for Natural Artistic Sounds Touching You, a 2000s grime music collective from London
- National Association of Spies, Traitors, and Yahoos, an evil organisation in the 1960s cartoon Roger Ramjet
