= Nasty Crew =

English grime music collective

- Origin: Plaistow, London, England
- Genres: Grime; UK garage
- Years active: 1999–2006
- Labels: Jahmek the World; East Iz East; Aftershock; Heatseeker Recordings
- Past members: Marcus Nasty; Sharky Major; Stormin; Armour; Mak 10; Hitman Hyper; D Double E; Jammer; Terror Danjah; Kano; Monkstar; Ghetts; Footsie; Lil Nasty; Griminal; Lightnin; Demon; Nasty Jack; Big Seac; Shorty Smalls; Brutal; Yunga Hunga; Faz-e 45; Fizz; Blade; Kasimo

Nasty Crew (commonly stylised as N.A.S.T.Y., a backronym for Natural Artistic Sounds Touching You) was a British grime crew from East London, with its members primarily from Newham. The group was founded by DJ Marcus Nasty and MCs Sharky Major and Stormin in 1999, and its membership underwent frequent changes in the following years, with most artists forming or joining successor crews by 2006. It is regarded as a pioneering collective within grime music history and several of its former members have charted in the United Kingdom, including Kano, Ghetts, D Double E, and Jammer.

== History ==
=== 1999–2001: Formation ===
Nasty Crew was founded by Plaistow-based artists Marcus Nasty, Sharky Major and Stormin in 1999 as a UK garage crew, when they were teenagers. Prior to the crew's formation, Sharky was performing at youth clubs and house parties, typically alongside Crazy Titch and Demon. Stormin had previously been a jungle MC in YGS Crew alongside Armour and Dizzee Rascal (then a DJ by the name Dizzy D), performing in Bow youth club The Linc Centre and house parties, and already had a reputation for freestyling, beatboxing and clashing other artists.

Sharky, who was originally a garage DJ as well as a rapper, met Marcus Nasty at a DJ competition where he failed to progress to the final and decided to MC at the event instead. Marcus, who already had a Flava FM pirate radio show, asked Sharky to join him for an appearance; Sharky also invited Demon, who was unavailable, so Stormin was brought in by a mutual friend in his place and the three established Nasty Crew after a fellow presenter gave them the name during their first broadcast. Stormin invited Armour to join the group shortly after its inception, and Dizzee participated in several of the crew's early radio sets, also collaborating with them on the dubplate "Ready 4 War" which later appeared on the 20th anniversary edition of his debut album Boy in da Corner.

=== 2001–2003: Recruitment of new members and Jahmek the World releases ===
D Double E, Hitman Hyper and Jammer each individually joined the crew over the course of three or four months, after their own Newham-based crew 187 had disbanded following in-fighting and had given up their own Flava FM show. Sharky approached D Double E, who had graduated from his school a few years earlier, to invite him on board after learning that 187 had ended their radio residency. D Double E later recalled: "I was kinda sceptical because he was a younger, but I jumped on a set with them and enjoyed it, so I brought Hyper and Jammer with me next time." Hyper's recollection is that they were formally brought into the crew after Marcus Nasty requested a meeting. Producer Terror Danjah, a fellow St. Bonaventure's alumnus who had led the jungle collective Reckless Crew with Hyper and D Double E and moved into garage music, was also invited into the crew.

Marcus spent two years in prison between mid-2001 and November 2003, and during this period his brother, Mak 10, became the crew's primary DJ. By 2002, the crew had secured a Monday night show on Deja Vu FM, through which they went on to gain regional prominence in London. Fans would record the shows onto bootleg cassette tapes which they shared with friends across the country, furthering the group's popularity and attracting regional bookings outside of London.

Jammer and his productions, predominantly created using Korg Trinity sounds, are credited by Marcus Nasty with the evolution of the group's sound from garage to grime. Early songs recorded to his instrumentals included D Double E's "Birds in the Sky" and Sharky Major's "Dis Ain't a Game". Jammer also produced the crew's October 2002 debut single "Good U Know", which sold out "on promo". Kano, who knew Sharky growing up, and Monkstar, then known as Monkey and a former member of D Double E's prior crew M.A.D., joined the crew at the same time in 2002. The pair were asked to prove themselves with a back-to-back freestyle in Jammer's basement, after which they were invited into the group. Jammer claims that he was asked to choose between Kano and Dizzee Rascal, and made the decision based on whose tones he felt would best complement his productions.

Jammer's label, Jahmek the World, became an outlet for the group's releases including the crew's December 2002 single "Take You Out", his 2003 single "Destruction", and Kano's 2003 single "Vice Versa (Boys Love Girls)", which sold several thousand copies and later featured as a bonus track on his debut album Home Sweet Home. During this time, Mak 10's cousin Nasty Jack began inviting the crew onto his Freeze FM show on a regular basis, and was later recognised as a member of the crew in 2004. Ghetts, then known as Ghetto, had been in correspondence with Sharky and Stormin during his time served in HMP Huntercombe for car crimes. He was released on 4 August 2003 and soon joined the group; his first recorded song was the Jammer-produced Dancehall Mafia song "Mind Works", which appeared on the Lord of the Decks Vol. 2 compilation.

Another Nasty Crew single, "Cock Back", was released in September 2003; produced by Terror Danjah and released via his label Aftershock, it saw Hitman Hyper and D Double E joined by guests Crazy Titch and Riko Dan. The song was picked as the 'Power Play' on Deja Vu FM and topped the sales chart at specialist London record store Rhythm Division; Terror Danjah has claimed it sold around 10,000 copies in total. Footsie formally joined the crew following Marcus Nasty's November 2003 release from prison, while Jammer left the group the same month following a public dispute about unpaid royalties from Jahmek the World releases. Despite this, plans remained at the time to release a Nasty Crew album featuring several Jammer productions.

=== 2003–2005: Departure of members, Lord of the Mics and Younger Nasty ===
D Double E, Footsie and Monkstar had left the group by the end of 2003, due to a disagreement about Double soliciting live bookings in the name of the collective. Another crew cut, "We Can Do Things", was receiving airplay by early 2004. Kano signed to 679 Recordings as a solo artist on his 19th birthday in May 2004. In July, Kano appeared on the first edition of Jammer's battle rap DVD series Lord of the Mics, clashing Wiley, which brought him further attention from the industry. Younger Nasty, a then-new faction of the group consisting of its junior members, appeared on the same DVD, teaming up with local crew Kids in da Hood to clash North West London's SLK. As of July 2004, Younger Nasty was made up of Lil Nasty, Griminal, Snoopy, Sub Zero and Lightnin. In September, Marcus Nasty announced that the group would release a double CD "street album", with the first disc to feature him, Stormin and garage MC Sharky P and the second to feature Kano, Demon, Ghetts and Younger Nasty. The album was never released.

In March 2005, the group announced to RWD Magazine what they termed a "merger" of Younger Nasty into Nasty Crew, with junior members such as Lil Nasty, Griminal, Brutal, Lightnin and Yunga Hunga incorporated into the main crew, some of them having previously appeared as a part of Lil Nasty's crew Straight From Hell and Griminal's crew M.I.C. Nasty Crew collaborated with producer Agent X on two songs released in April 2005: "Nasty Bonanza", a single which also featured members of Dynasty Crew, and "City Life", a song in which Stormin, Demon and Big Seac appeared as Nasty Crew. Both were released via Agent X's label, Heatseeker, with the latter exclusively found on the RWD Access All Artists Mixtape Vol. 1, mixed by Logan Sama. Kano, Ghetts and Demon left the crew later in 2005 due to a fall-out between Marcus Nasty and the newly signed and managed Kano, events Ghetts later referenced on the 2021 song "Autobiography".

=== 2005–2006: Scrapped album N.A.S.T.Y. By Nature ===
A later iteration of the group was fronted by Stormin and Nasty Jack, who independently organised and funded the group's recording sessions and release campaigns. Marcus Nasty admitted in a September 2005 interview with RWD that the collective had become "more of a massive label" than a crew, planning to release solo material from members such as Fizz's "My Way" and Blade's "Bussing It", and had found themselves having to "beg for beats" after parting ways with Jammer. He also clarified that the group's current lineup consisted of him, Mak 10, Lightnin, Stormin, Kasimo, Lil Nasty, Faz-e 45, Fizz and Griminal among others.

"In the Place" and "Run 4 Cover", both produced by Rossi B and Luca, were released as a double single on 7 November 2005, with the video released in September. The former was originally produced by J Sweet, before being swapped for the new instrumental, described by Stormin as "on some old skool, pimp style". The latter features the first appearance of Stormin's then-anonymous alias Teddy Bruckshot.

The group collaborated with producer Blackjack on the single "Nasty Gang Banga" in 2005, released via DJ Cameo's label On a Level. The song was independently re-released in August 2006 under the name "Girls Love N.A.S.T.Y." as a double single alongside "Run It Up", originally taken from Stormin's 2005 mixtape Storm the Streets, accompanied by a combined music video. A remix of "Run It Up" featuring Wizzy B and Demon was also released. The group opened for Joe Budden in Amsterdam while promoting the single, and the music video reportedly won an Urban Music Award following an online public vote.

The group intended to release a third single entitled "This Song" during what Jack refers to as the "Myspace era"; the track, which was produced by Sir Spyro, was featured on radio playlists but was not released. A new song called "One More Night" was played on Cameo's 1Xtra show in April 2006. The group also announced a debut project, N.A.S.T.Y. By Nature, to feature "Girls Love N.A.S.T.Y.", "Run 4 Cover" and "In the Place", which never materialised, although RWD deputy editor Danny Walker reported in September 2006 that the project had been completed and consisted of twenty songs.

=== 2006–2011: Label and internet radio ventures ===
Members of the crew subsequently released music under the label name N.A.S.T.Y. UK, particularly associated with the online output of the younger Ramsay brothers Lil Nasty and Griminal. Griminal's 2008 mixtape It's Not Just Barz and its singles "It's Alot" and "Not Just Bars" were credited to the labels N.A.S.T.Y. UK and Alwayz Recording. In 2010, the Ramsays launched the internet radio station Nasty FM; notable resident DJs on their roster included Mak 10, Ahadadream, Serocee and Freeza Chin. In a February 2011 interview for the new station, Marcus Nasty referred to Nasty Crew in the past tense; he claimed "just the brothers" were continuing to use the N.A.S.T.Y. name as "this is our brand", and anyone else claiming to still be part of the crew were "more the people that haven’t got anything and are just holding onto something that’s not really there anymore". Several former members of Nasty Crew including Stormin, Hitman Hyper and Griminal appeared alongside Yunga Hunga on the 2012 song "Big Bang", taken from his free EP About to Land.

== Legacy ==
Journalist Chantelle Fiddy has credited Jammer and Nasty Crew with "providing one of the first consistent sounds with a crew" within the grime scene. In his youth, platinum-selling rapper Tinie Tempah would borrow bootleg tapes of the crew's Deja Vu FM shows, describing Sharky Major and D Double E as "the main MCs back then" and Sharky as "[one] of my heroes". BRIT Award nominee CASisDEAD has claimed the crew's Deja Vu FM show introduced him to the genre, as has Grammy Award-winning producer and songwriter Scribz Riley. Grime videographer Rooney Keefe of Risky Roadz has claimed he "grew up listening to" Nasty Crew. Ruff Sqwad affiliate XTC, producer of the instrumental "Functions on the Low" which was later used on Stormzy's UK top ten single "Shut Up", has also credited the crew as an early inspiration.

Although the crew collectively never achieved chart success or a major record deal, several of its members have since launched successful solo careers. After leaving Nasty Crew, D Double E reached number eleven on the UK Singles Chart and received a MOBO Award in 2004 for the Lethal Bizzle song "Pow! (Forward)". He later formed Newham Generals with Footsie, Monkstar and DJ Tubby, regarded as some of the first dubstep MCs, and has since charted as a solo artist, including with his 2018 debut album Jackuum!, which reached number 61 on the UK Albums Chart, and "Fresh N Clean (Silence the Critics)", created for IKEA's 2019 Christmas advert, which reached number 47 in the UK. Jammer went on to form his own crew Neckle Camp before joining Boy Better Know. He reached number 111 in the UK with the 2016 Skepta collaboration "Detox", and number 58 with the 2020 Frisco collaboration "Red Card". Griminal briefly signed to All Around the World, part of major label Universal, in 2010, although has never charted.

Kano's 2005 debut album Home Sweet Home reached number 36 in the UK and featured appearances from fellow alumni Ghetts, Demon and D Double E. It was certified Gold by the BPI in 2013. His 2016 album Made in the Manor, his first with Parlophone, reached number eight on the UK Albums Chart, won a MOBO Award, and was shortlisted for the Mercury Prize. Certified Gold by the BPI, it includes various lyrics where he reminisces back to 2004, when he was a member of Nasty Crew. His 2019 single "Class of Deja", which features D Double E and Ghetts, charted at number 79 in the UK and is named after the crew's former Deja Vu FM radio show.

Ghetts and Lightnin went on to form The Movement with Wretch 32, Scorcher, Devlin, Mercston and DJ Unique. Ghetts independently achieved chart success in the UK with his first two albums, the number 23 entry Rebel with a Cause in 2014 and the number 30 entry Ghetto Gospel: The New Testament in 2018. He signed to Warner in 2021 to release his third album Conflict of Interest. The album is the highest-charting by a Nasty Crew alumnus to date, reaching number two on the UK Albums Chart. His fourth album and last with Warner, On Purpose, with Purpose, reached number 29 in 2024 and was shortlisted for the Mercury Prize.

Co-founder Marcus Nasty secured a long-standing residency on Rinse FM, through which he has been credited as an early champion of the UK funky genre. Sharky Major later founded the events company, record label and clothing brand Grime Originals, which has featured appearances from both pioneers of grime and newer artists at its club nights. Stormin became a prominent MC in the jump up style of drum and bass, later forming the supergroup SaSaSaS with Macky Gee, DJ Phantasy, MC Skibadee, Shabba D and Harry Shotta. He remained an active grime artist at the same time, including under his Teddy Bruckshot alias, until his death from skin cancer in February 2018.

== Discography ==
=== Singles ===
==== As lead artist ====
| Year | Title | Album | Featured members |
|---|---|---|---|
| 2002 | "Good U Know" | Non-album single | Sharky Major, Stormin, Armour, Jammer (prod.) |
| 2002 | "Take You Out" (featuring Biggaman) | Non-album single | Sharky Major, D Double E, Hitman Hyper, Kano, Jammer (also prod.) |
| 2003 | "Cock Back" (featuring Crazy Titch and Riko Dan) | Non-album single | Hitman Hyper, D Double E, Terror Danjah (prod.) |
| 2005 | "Nasty Bonanza" (featuring Marci Phonix, Hitman Tiga, Hyper Fen and Sharky P) | Non-album single | Hitman Hyper, Demon, Ghetts, Lightnin, Big Seac, Stormin, Nasty Jack |
| 2006 | "Girls Love N.A.S.T.Y." | Non-album single | Nasty Jack, Griminal, Stormin, Kasimo, Hitman Hyper, Sharky Major |
| 2006 | "Run It Up" | Storm the Streets (Stormin mixtape) | Stormin, Armour, Nasty Jack |
| 2018 | "Passing Away" (recorded circa 2003; released by Jammer as a free download via WeTransfer in tribute to Stormin) | Non-album single | Sharky Major, Kano, D Double E |

==== As featured artist ====
| Year | Title | Album | Featured members |
|---|---|---|---|
| 2002 | "We Are the Worst" (Terror Danjah featuring N.A.S.T.Y. and Highly Flammable) | Non-album single | Terror Danjah (prod.) |
| 2005 | "Nasty Gang Banga" (Blackjack featuring N.A.S.T.Y.) | Non-album single | Nasty Jack, Griminal, Stormin, Kasimo, Hitman Hyper, Sharky Major |
| 2005 | "In the Place" / "Run 4 Cover" (Rossi B & Luca featuring N.A.S.T.Y.) | Non-album single | Nasty Jack (tracks 1 and 2), Stormin (tracks 1 and 2), Lightnin (track 1), Teddy Bruckshot (track 2), Armour (track 2), Kasimo (track 2) |

=== Guest appearances ===
| Year | Title | Album | Featured members |
|---|---|---|---|
| 2004 | "Cock Back (East Co. Version)" (Nasty Crew featuring Jookie Mundo and Demon of East Connection) | Box Bloody Fresh | Hitman Hyper, Terror Danjah (prod.) |
| 2005 | "Cock Back V1.2" (Nasty Crew featuring Riko Dan and Bruza) | Run the Road | Hitman Hyper, D Double E, Terror Danjah (prod.) |
| 2005 | "Nasty Time" (Virgo featuring N.A.S.T.Y. Crew and guests) | Nasty Time EP | Nasty Jack, Hitman Hyper, Lightnin, Stormin, Griminal, Armour |
| 2005 | "City Life" | RWD Access All Artists Mixtape Vol. 1 | Big Seac, Stormin, Demon |
| 2006 | "N.A.S.T.Y." (Ms. Dynamite featuring N.A.S.T.Y. Crew) | A Little Darker | Hitman Hyper, Sharky Major, Nasty Jack, Stormin |
| 2012 | "Big Bang" | About to Land | Yunga Hunga, Stormin, Hitman Hyper, Griminal |

== Trivia ==
- Crew members Marcus Nasty, Mak 10, Lil Nasty and Griminal are all siblings; Nasty Jack is their cousin.
