= Butterz =

Independent record label

- Founded: 2007
- Founder: Elijah & Skilliam
- Status: Active
- Distributor: AEI
- Genre: Grime, UK garage
- Location: London, England
- Official website: butterz.co.uk

Butterz is an independent record label based in London that specializes in grime music. It was founded by DJs and music producers Elijah and Skilliam. The label helped bring grime instrumentals to the forefront of the electronic music scene, and was ranked 10th in Fact's "The 10 Best Record Labels of 2011".

== History ==
Butterz began as a blog in 2007, run by Elijah and Skilliam. The blog consisted of downloads, interviews and features with grime musicians.

The label was formed in March 2010 and has since released grime music both digitally and on vinyl, from artists including Terror Danjah, Newham Generals, Royal-T, DJ Q, Flava D Swindle, Champion, P Money and Trim. In 2010 it was announced that the blog was ending so as to focus solely on the label.

David Kelly has designed all of the label's artwork, which for a long time, only used two colours: black and yellow.

=== Radio show ===
Elijah and Skilliam had a weekly regular show on Rinse FM from 2008 to 2014. In 2011, Elijah and Skilliam released Rinse: 17, a mixed compilation album featuring material from the radio show and the label.

=== Events ===
Butterz events take place in various nightclubs with label artists alongside guests. They have included appearances from JME, Skepta, Kode 9, DJ EZ, Joker and Kano. From 2013 to 2016 Elijah & Skilliam ran an offshoot night Jamz, with regular parties in Leeds, Manchester, Berlin and Liverpool, which ended with a final session streamed live on Boiler Room.

== Catalog ==
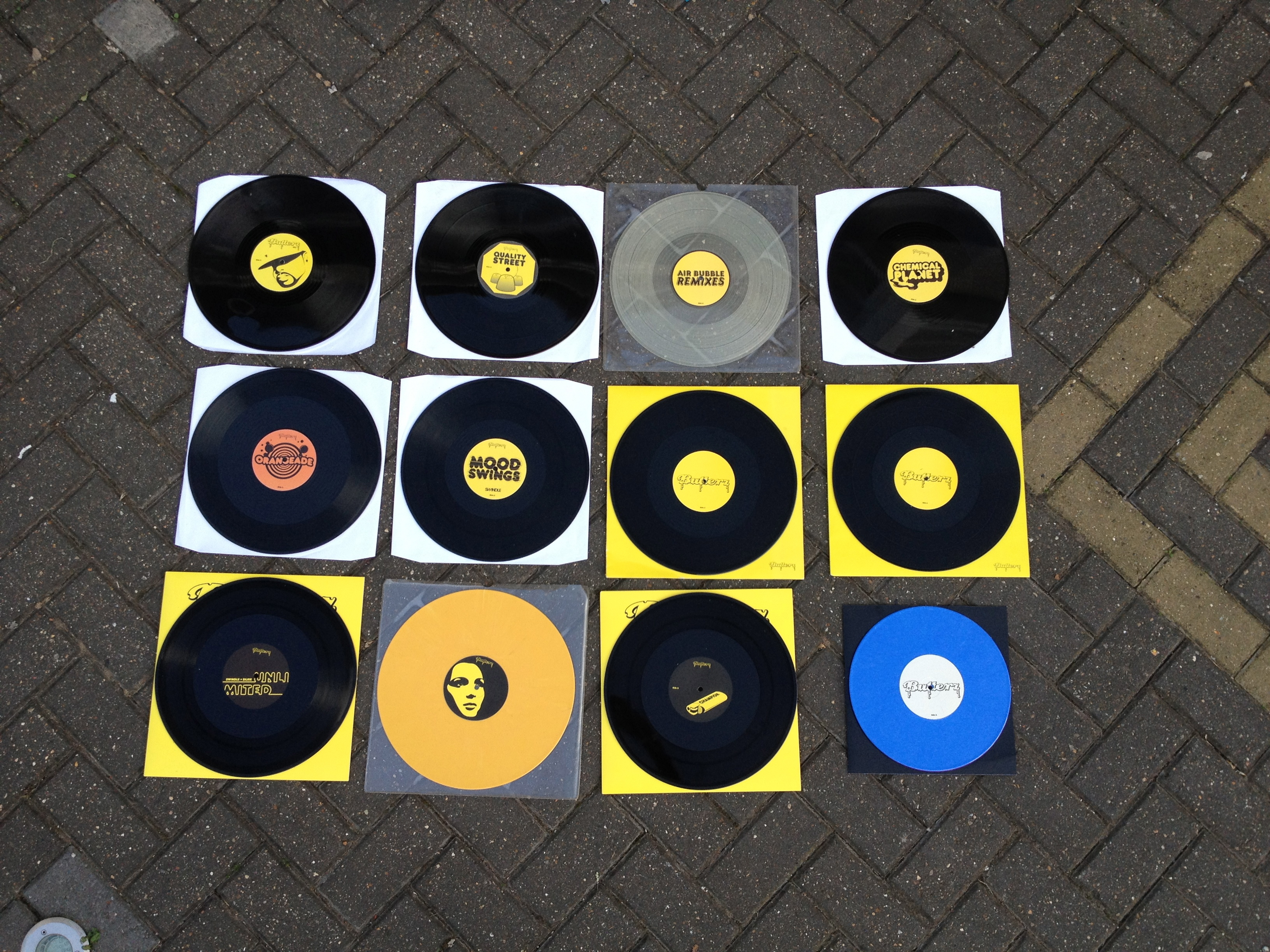
Butterz catalog, 1-11

Catalogue	Artist(s)	Title	Release date	Format
BR001	Terror Danjah	Bipolar EP	Jan 2010	12" EP, digital
BR002	Terror Danjah / Royal-T / SRC / Mr. Mitch	Quality Street EP	Sep 2010	12" EP, digital
BR003	Swindle / Starkey / Royal-T	Air Bubble Remixes	Nov 2010	12" EP (clear vinyl), digital
BR004	D.O.K	Chemical Planet / Keep on Making Grime	Nov 2010	12", digital
BRW001	TRC	Oo Aa Ee (VIP Mix)	Nov 2010	12" white label
BRW002	S-X	Woooo Riddim	Dec 2010	10" white label (blue / purple vinyl)
BR005	Royal-T	Orangeade EP	Jan 2011	12" EP, digital
BR006	Swindle	Mood Swings	Mar 2011	12", digital
SXDK001	S-X vs. Ramadanman	Woooo Glut / Bricks	Mar 2011	12" white label
BRVIP001	Swindle / Royal-T	Mood Swings VIP / Orangeade VIP	Apr 2011	12" white label
BR007	P Money & Blacks	Boo You	May 2011	12", digital
BR008	Trim	I Am / Notice Now	Aug 2011	12", digital
BR009	Swindle & Silkie	Unlimited / Pineapple	Mar 2012	12", digital
BTTRZ001	N/A	Butterz x Mishka NYC	Apr 2012	T-shirt
BR010	Terror Danjah & Ruby Lee Ryder	Let Me Be The One	Jun 2012	12" (yellow vinyl), digital
BR011	Champion	Crystal Meth / Speed	Jul 2012	12", digital
BTTRZ002	N/A	Butterz x New Era	Aug 2012	Hat
AIRMILES001	Swindle	Airmiles (20,000 Miles Later)	Feb 2013	12"
BRVIP002	Terror Danjah	Breakdance / Anger Management vs. Morph	Feb 2013	12" white label
BR012	Flava D	Hold On / Home	Mar 2013	12", digital
BTTRZ003	N/A	Butterz x Mishka NYC #2	Jun 2013	Capsule Collection
BRVIP003	Flava D	Home VIP / Hold on VIP	Oct 2013	12" white label, digital
BXK001	040	Let It Be Known / Minors	Feb 2014	12", digital
BR015	Royal-T & Flava D	On My Mind	Mar 2014	12", digital
BR016	Footsie	Scars	Jan 2015	12"
BR017	Royal-T	Shotta EP	Apr 2015	12" EP, digital
BR018	t q d	Day & Night	Apr 2015	12"
BR019	Rapid	The Rapid EP	Jul 2015	12" EP
BR017R	Royal-T	Shotta (Remixes)	Sep 2015	12" EP
AIRMILES002	Swindle	Peace, Love & Music	Sep 2015	LP, CD, digital
AIRMILES003	Swindle	Global Dance / Mad Ting	Sep 2015	12", digital
GRIME001	Elijah & Skilliam	Grime 2015	Nov 2015	2xCD, digital
USB001	t q d	USB	Aug 2016	USB
AIRMILES004	Swindle	Connecta	Sep 2016	12", digital
AIRMILES005	Swindle	Funk & Grime EP	Oct 2016	12", digital
GRIME002	Elijah & Skilliam	Grime 2016	Oct 2016	2xCD, digital
BR020	t q d	Only One / Ghosts	Dec 2016	12", digital
AIRMILES006	Swindle	Purple Walls	Feb 2017	12", digital
TQD001	t q d	UKG	Mar 2017	2xLP, CD, digital
HAPPY	Flava D	Happy (Murlo Remix)	Sep 2017	Digital
BR021	Murlo	Wind Me Up	Sep 2017	Digital

== See also ==
- List of independent UK record labels
