= Isii Nafta =

Single by Nimco Happy
- Language: Somali; English; Arabic; Swahili
- English title: "Give Me Your Soul"
- Released: 2017
- Length: 4:17
- Composer(s): Abwaan Dhaga-jilic

"Isii Nafta" is a song recorded by Somali singer Nimco Happy and released in mid-2017. Happy has performed the song at several concerts in Somalia and the song is popular in the country. In 2021, "Isii Nafta" became a popular on the video sharing platform TikTok, becoming one of the most popular songs in Shazam in many countries, the song also ranked at 23 on Billboard World Digital Song Sales. On October 28, the song was officially released by Happy and her new record label Polydor as "Isii Nafta (Love You More Than My Life)".

== Background and release ==
Nimco Happy recorded and released "Isii Nafta" in mid 2017, becoming a hit in Somalia. Happy performed the song on television programs and local concerts in her country. Thanks to the song Happy become one of the most prominent female singers in Somalia.

== Global recognition ==
In 2021, "Isii Nafta" became a popular song on the video sharing platform TikTok, becoming one of the few Somali songs to reach a global audience. Happy signed with Polydor Records and on October 28 she released the song officially on music streaming service as "Isii Nafta" (Love You More Than My Life)". "Isii Nafta" was mostly noted for the fact that the Happy sang in three languages, in particular, except for the main languages of Somalia, English, Arabic and Swahili.

== Charts ==
Weekly chart performance for "Isii Nafta"
Chart (2021)	Peak position
US (World Digital Song Sales)	23

In November, the song peaked 23 on Billboard's World Digital Song Sales, making Happy the first Somali singer to do so.
