= Flava D =

British DJ

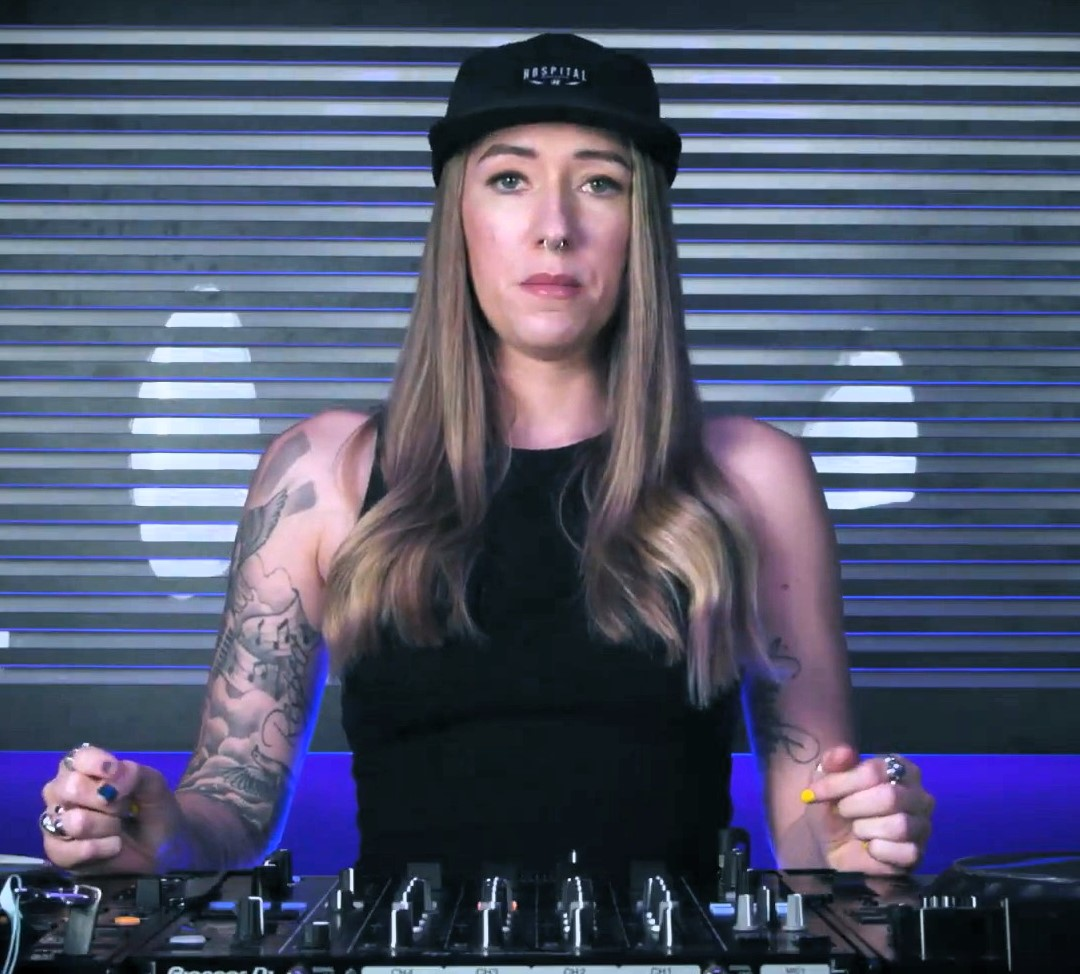
- Flava D teaches an online disk jockey class in 2023

Background information
- Born: Danielle Anne Louise Gooding; Bournemouth, England
- Genres: UK garage, grime, bassline, house, drum and bass
- Occupations: DJ, radio presenter, producer
- Years active: 2006–present
- Labels: Butterz, Hospital Records

Danielle Anne Louise Gooding, professionally known as Flava D, is an English UK garage, grime, bassline and drum and bass DJ and music producer. She was previously signed to the Butterz record label and is now signed to Hospital Records. She is one third of the supergroup TQD, alongside fellow producers Royal-T and DJ Q.

== Early life ==
Gooding spent her childhood moving between Birmingham and Bournemouth and grew up listening to early popular UK garage releases such as DJ EZ's Pure Garage mix CDs, as well as local pirate radio stations. Whilst working in a record shop from the ages of 14 to 16, her boss, who was a DJ, encouraged her to start producing music on Ableton.

== Career ==
After she had begun producing music, Gooding mostly made grime and hip-hop releases and uploaded them online. After messaging Wiley multiple times on Myspace in 2008, he asked her to send him some music. She sent him "Twenty-odd Beats", to which he replied that he was interested in some of them. The two then released multiple tracks together. This caused her to grow in reputation from other artists that she later worked with, such as Ghetts, Maxsta and Merky Ace. Multiple of her tracks were featured in the album release of the third iteration of long-standing grime 'clashing' event Lord of the Mics, hosted by Jammer.

Eventually Gooding caught the attention of Butterz record label owners Elijah and Skilliam with her track "Hold On", a UK garage track that was a departure from some of the heavier music she was previously known for creating. The duo signed her up to the label to make her first real release "Hold On/Home" in 2011. This affiliation with Butterz would continue indefinitely and was the catalyst in her becoming a major musical artist, as it was with this connection that she learned how to DJ and gained regular radio airplay on established radio stations like Rinse FM and Kiss FM on which she at one point hosted a weekly show.

With continued growth thanks to critically acclaimed releases such as her In the Dance EP which Resident Advisor stated was "so energetic that it's hard not to get sucked in", Flava D gained the attention of other artists making bassline and UK garage music and began working with fellow Butterz member Royal-T. The pair gained underground recognition with their track "On My Mind" which spawned multiple further remixes.

Flava D released her first album More Love in 2015, which she deemed her "most personal project yet". This album was again critically acclaimed for emphasing the "sheer diversity within her style" by Clash, who also stated she had a "style all of her own". This would continue with further projects, including the release of a sequel album More Love 2, released for free digitally in January 2018. She released another project, Spicy Noodles EP in August of the same year on the Night Bass record label.

In February 2020 it was announced that Flava D had signed to drum and bass label Hospital Records.

== Work with TQD ==
TQD (often stylised as t q d or tqd) is a collaborative act that was formed in 2015, comprising Royal-T, DJ Q and Flava D, with the name TQD being an amalgamation of the last letter of each of their names. All three artists were already signed to the Butterz record label and thus all TQD releases have also been released on Butterz. The act play and produce the genres of music that the individuals do (such as UK garage, bassline and grime), however they have released experimental tracks that cross into many other genres.

In 2015, Royal-T and DJ Q were collaborating on their first project together and they asked Flava D if she wanted to join in on the project too. This would then go on to be their debut single "Day and Night", released on Butterz on 18 April 2015, both digitally and as a limited 500 copy vinyl pressing. This track was released as "Day and Night (Day Mix)", however an alternate mix of the single was also released on the B-side as "Day and Night (Night Mix)". Due to their solo efforts and differences in location however, TQD releases were sparse with their second track titled "Ghosts" being previewed digitally over a year later in 2016 and then being released on their second vinyl release "Only One/Ghosts".

The trio gained ample attention due to their releases and increasingly popular live sets and thus began working on an album together. This was formally announced at the beginning of 2017 to be a self-titled debut album, ukg, and would be released on 17 March 2017. The album contains features from P Money, Swindle and Skilliam and was met with generally positive reviews. Pitchfork called the track "Vibsing Ting" "strange and outstanding" and Mixmag said it consisted of "10 hard-hitting face melters". However, Clash magazine wrote that the album was "disappointingly short" and that "there’s a feeling that t q d aren’t really a case for three heads being better than one". The Bandcamp release of ukg contained three extra tracks that were not present on the vinyl or physical CD releases.

Though they have not made any official releases since their debut album as a trio, each member continues to produce and release music individually and the act still performs shows in many countries around the world, including the United Kingdom, Spain and Japan.

== Discography ==
Title	Release date/Label
Strawberry EP	Released: 2012; Label: Pitch Controller
BRVIP003	Released: 2013; Label: Butterz
Hold On/Home	Released: 2013; Label: Butterz
Volume 1	Released: 2013
Volume 2	Released: 2013
Volume 3	Released: 2013
On My Mind	Released: 2014; Label: Butterz
In the Dance EP	Released: 2014; Label: Formula Records
FlavaD.com Volume 5	Released: 2014
PS (with DJ Q)	Released: 2014; Label: Local Action
More Love	Released: 2015
Bump and Grind	Released: 2015
FabricLive.88	Released: 2016; Label: Fabric
Rhythm & Gash (with Rebound X)	Released: 2016
More Love 2	Released: 2018
Spicy Noodles EP	Released: 2018; Label: Night Bass
Human Trumpet	Released: 2019; Label: Hospital Records
Spicy Noodles VIP	Released: 2019; Label: Night Bass
Show Me (with Redlight)	Released: 2020
Mesmerize	Released: 2020; Label: Hospital Records
What You Mean 2 Me	Released: 2020; Label: Hospital Records
Desert Lights	Released: 2020; Label: Hospital Records
Watching You (with CIFIKA)	Released: 2020
Now Or Never (with Friction)	Released: 2020; Label: Elevate Records
Secure the Bag (with Skepsis)	Released: 2020; Label: Crucast x Night Bass
Berlin EP	Released: 2020
All We Ever	Released: 2021; Label: Hospital Records
Miss Dopamine (with Paige Eliza)	Released: 2023; Label: UTOPIA
Now Or Never (with Friction)	Released: 2020; Label: Elevate Records
Here & Now	Released: 2025; Label: Hospital Records
