= The Hill (band) =

The Hill were a short-lived British band whose members wrote and performed music for Chris Farlowe, with whom they released one album and three singles. The Hill also released a preliminary single without Farlowe. Though The Hill existed for only a brief period, its members had (or, in certain cases, went on to have) significant careers on their own.

== Background ==
During the 1960s, bassist Bruce "Bugs" Waddell was a member of The Thunderbirds, Chris Farlowe's backing band (along with Dave Greenslade and Carl Palmer). He was involved in Farlowe's career as early as 1965, when Farlowe recorded "Stormy Monday Blues" under the name Little Joe Cook. By 1969, Farlowe's label, Immediate Records, was on the verge of dissolution. Around that time, Waddell formed a group with guitarist Steve Hammond (with whom he had co-written a single, "Dawn," for Farlowe), keyboardist Peter Robinson (who had been in Episode Six with Ian Gillan), cellist Paul Buckmaster (who had performed on David Bowie's "Space Oddity"), and drummer Colin Davey. It was this line-up of musicians that was called The Hill.

== From Here to Mama Rosa and single releases ==
In 1969, The Hill recorded a promo single, "Sylvie" b/w "The Fourth Annual Convention of the Battery Hen Farmers Association Part II," which was the last single released by Immediate Records. Shortly thereafter, the group set about writing and recording songs for a full-length album to be released on Polydor. Sensing that none among them had suitable singing skills, the band arranged for Farlowe to join them, since he had recently completed a nine-month tour of the United States and was available to contribute his vocals. Stuart Mackay was brought in to produce the album and write the liner notes; he also assisted with the songwriting on a few tracks.

=== Track listing ===
Side I
No.	Title	Writer(s)	Length
1.	"Travelling into Make Believe"	Alcock/Crane	4:40
2.	"Fifty Years"	Mackay/Waddell	2:45
3.	"Where Do We Go From Here?"	Hammond/Waddell/Mackay	4:58
4.	"Questions"	Waddell/Mackay	3:48
5.	"Head in the Clouds"	Hammond/Waddell	7:00

Side II
No.	Title	Writer(s)	Length
1.	"Are You Sleeping?"	Hammond/Mackay/Waddell	5:40
2.	"Black Sheep"	Hammond	4:52
3.	"Winter of My Life"	Waddell/Hammond	4:10
4.	"Mama Rosa"	Mackay/Hammond/Waddell	7:45

From Here to Mama Rosa was released in September 1970 on Polydor. Three singles resulted from the album sessions and were released that same year on Polydor:

- “Black Sheep” b/w “Fifty Years” (The A-side was given its full title in this context, with “Black Sheep Of The Family” printed on the label)
- “Put Out The Light” b/w “Questions” (The A-side was a cover of a track by Ray Pohlman)
- "Mama Rosa" b/w "Questions"

== Legacy ==
Despite their brief existence as a band, The Hill left behind a catalogue of tracks that would be covered by a number of other artists. Furthermore, the members of The Hill would go on to enjoy prolific careers of their own.

Peter Robinson joined Quatermass, who recorded a version of "Black Sheep of the Family" for their self-titled 1970 album. Robinson went on to work with bands and artists such as Bryan Ferry, Brand X, and Phil Collins. He also composed soundtracks for films such as The World's Fastest Indian and Blind Fury, among many others.

Paul Buckmaster contributed cello to the first Quatermass album and went on to great success as an arranger for artists such as Elton John, The Rolling Stones, and Train, for whose song "Drops of Jupiter" he won a Grammy for Best Arranger Accompanying Vocal.

Steve Hammond joined Fat Mattress, with whom he recorded a version of "Black Sheep of the Family" that was released as the B-side to the single "Highway." Afterward, he worked for many years as a songwriter and session guitarist for other artists. He also composed the music for a sci-fi themed rock musical titled Flash Fearless Versus The Zorg Women Parts 5 & 6, which was released in 1975 and featured guest appearances by several singers and musicians of note, such as Alice Cooper, Eddie Jobson, John Entwistle, Keith Moon, Justin Hayward, Bill Bruford, and Jim Dandy, among others.

Colin Davey went on to play drums for Ronnie Lane (of the Small Faces) in Slim Chance.

Chris Farlowe joined Colosseum after Mama Rosa was released, and later joined Atomic Rooster.

A wide variety of artists recorded cover versions of songs by The Hill. Ritchie Blackmore's Rainbow recorded "Black Sheep of the Family" for their 1975 debut album, and Al Atkins (formerly of Judas Priest) featured his own version of the song on his 1998 album Victim of Changes. Additionally, Italian singer Al Bano recorded a version of "Mama Rosa," modified with Italian lyrics, for his 1971 album 1972 (On the label, it is spelled "Mamma Rosa"); he also released it as a single. Charles Hilton Brown also covered this track. An Italian group called The Orbit covered "Questions," and yet another Italian band, I Nomadi, adapted "Winter of My Life" (under the title "Icaro") for their 1973 album Un Giorno Insieme.

== See also ==
- List of Polydor Records artists
- 1969 in music
