= Cleo. =

- Born: Cleopatra Humphrey; 4 November 1988 (age 37); Bow, London, England
- Genres: Grime; electronic; UK funky
- Occupations: Rapper; singer
- Years active: 2006–present
- Labels: Universal; AWAL; Atlantic; A-List; Sony
- Formerly of: Aftershock

Cleopatra Humphrey (born 4 November 1988) formerly known by her stage name Mz. Bratt and currently known as Cleo., is an English rapper and singer.

== History ==
Cleo. was born in Bow, London. Later, she moved to Hainault and started producing her music. Her talent impressed grime producer and Aftershock label owner Terror Danjah, who took her under his wing after hearing her at local MC battles and seeing her Myspace profile. Cleo. was selected to be part of the T4 entertainment show the Musicool, in which she was the lead female, at one point reducing guest judge Jamelia to tears with her exceptional talent and vocal ability. Following this, Cleo. embarked on a US and European tour with The Count & Sinden, which included shows at the Glastonbury Festival and at Bestival.

Cleo. has a mixed race ethnic background.

== Music career ==
Cleo.'s first single, "Who Do You Think You Are?", was released on All Around the World Productions on 27 July 2009, and received plays on BBC Radio 1 and BBC Radio 1Xtra. The second single, "I Like You", followed in November, and was also played by Radio 1Xtra.

In February 2010, Cleo. joined a new collective group formed by Wiley called A-List.

She released her third single, "Selecta", in mid-2010, under A-List Music Ltd, produced by Redlight. She is expected to release her first album at the American Airlines Arena in Miami, Florida, in February 2012 alongside the likes of Usher and Nicole Scherzinger.

I describe my music and sound as "fun, cheeky, endorsing female empowerment".

— Mz. Bratt, Female First

Cleo. has also appeared on remixes and records with other artists including Wiley, Taio Cruz, Sadie Ama, Dionne Bromfield and Jazmine Sullivan. A remix of Tinchy Stryder's "Game Over" was promoted online in November 2010 under the name "Female Takeover Remix", with the female MCs Ruff Diamondz, Envy, Lioness, Cherri V, Baby Blue, A.Dot, Lady Leshurr, RoXXXan and Cleo.

In 2015 she announced her professional name would be Cleo.

== 2012 and album ==
Cleo. released a video for her upcoming single "Falling Down", on 16 April 2012 on YouTube. The single is officially released on iTunes on 6 May 2012. Cleo. has confirmed that she is recording songs for her first studio album, but won't release the album until there's a demand and people want the album. She has so far recorded about 50 tracks, but she only wants 5 tracks to be used on her album. She has also confirmed that she wants features on her songs, but only after she has recorded all of her songs. Mz Bratt has also stated in various interviews that she would love to work with Chris Martin from Coldplay, Labrinth and Wretch 32 on her new album. That album was expected to be released in 2013, but it was never released.

== Personal life ==
Cleo's father is MC Scallywag from the early 1990s acid house sound system Spiral Tribe.

== Discography ==
=== Extended plays ===
- 2015: Beauty For Ashes

=== Mixtapes ===
- 2007: Give It To Em, Vol. 1
- 2009: Give It To Em, Vol. 2
- 2011: Elements

=== Singles ===
Title	Year	Peak chart positions		Album
Title	Year	UK	UK Urban Chart	Album
"I Like You" (featuring Sadie Ama)	2009	–	—	Give It to Em Vol 1
"Who Do You Think You Are?"	2009	–	—	Give It to Em Vol 1
"Selecta"	2010	–	—	Non-album singles
"Get Dark"	2011	–	—	Non-album singles
"Speeding" (featuring Dot Rotten)	2011	–	—	Non-album singles
"Tear It All Down"	2011	–	—	Non-album singles
"Falling Down" (featuring Khalaeliah)	2012	–	—	Non-album single
"—" denotes a recording that did not chart or was not released.

=== As featured artist ===
Single	Year	Peak chart positions	Album
Single	Year	UK	Album
"Woman's World" (Selah featuring Sadie Ama and Cleo.)	2010	—	Non-album single
"Go Hard" (Fugative featuring Cleo. and Wiley)	2010	—	No Goin' Home
"Game Over – Female Takeover" (Tinchy Stryder featuring Ruff Diamondz, Amplify Dot, Envy, CherriV, BabyBlue, RoxXxan, Lioness, Cleo. and Lady Leshurr)	2010	—	Non-album single
"Teardrop" (as part of The Collective)	2011	24	Charity release
"Battle" (Danny Byrd)	2013		Golden Ticket

=== Soundtrack appearances ===
Song	Year	Artist(s)	Movie	Ref.
"Ouch"	2011	Dionne Bromfield (featuring Cleo.)	Demons Never Die	

== Filmography ==
- 2011 Anuvahood (as Shay)
