= Durrty Goodz =

British grime MC, rapper and songwriter

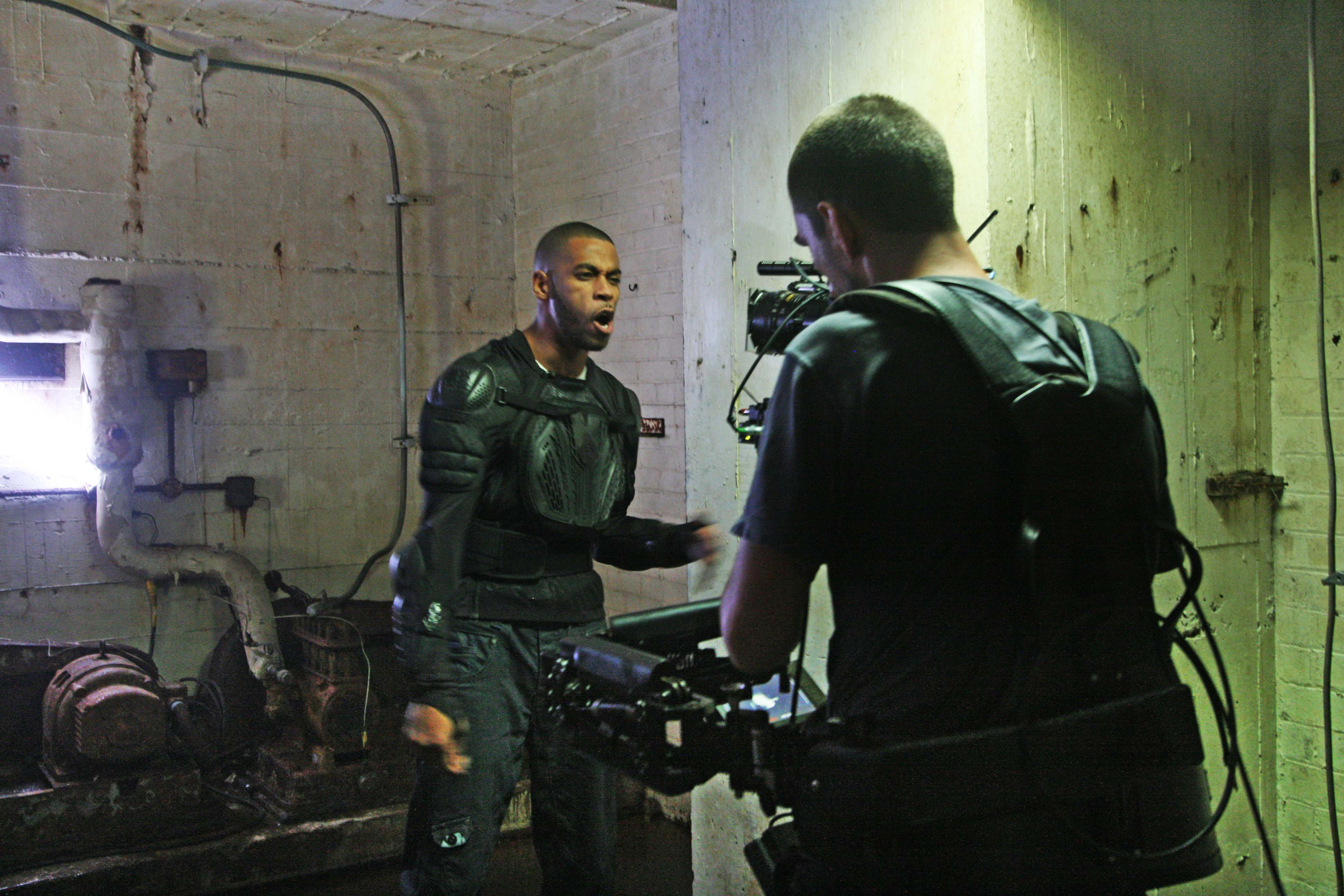
- Dwayne Mahorn in video shoot for the track "Oi What You Lookin' At" from the "Overall" project in 2011.

Background information
- Also known as: Durrty Doogz; OG Rootz
- Born: Dwayne Mahorn; 11 May 1981 (age 45); London, England
- Origin: Chingford Hall Estate
- Genres: Hip hop; grime; British hip hop
- Occupations: MC; rapper; songwriter
- Years active: 1996–present
- Labels: Polydor Records, Universal Records, Tru Thoughts, Awkward Music

Dwayne Mahorn (born 11 May 1981), better known by his stage name Durrty Goodz, is a British grime MC, rapper and songwriter from London. He is known for his versatility across his tracks with a flow that fuses many styles, from dancehall to reggae to hip-hop and bashment, evoking artists as disparate as Ludacris, Kardinal Offishall and Pharoahe Monch. He is known for his lyricism, flow and wit on the mic.

== Career ==
Mahorn was first featured on the Skibadee mixtape 2 Fast 2 Ferocious in 2003 but a year prior, a bootleg mixtape had circulated online entitled It's Real, Vol. 1. He was also featured on many sets on radio stations.

He was signed to Polydor Records in 2005, but left due to a lack of creative control.

He was named Best MC by the London pirate radio station Kool FM, which led to recognition in the London underground music scene, and was signed to Universal Records soon after. Mahorn made appearances on local radio programmes, mixtapes, and 12-inch singles as well. He featured in Logan Sama's radio segment on Kiss 100 London in 2011.

Mahorn's brother Carl Dobson was accused and later convicted of murdering 21-year-old Richard Holmes, and was sentenced to life imprisonment with a minimum term of 30 years. Mahorn spent nearly a year on remand in prison in relation to the same incident until November 2006 when he was acquitted. Durrty Goodz recorded a track called "Letter 2 Titch" about the incident.

Mahorn returned to his career in 2007, releasing the Axiom EP. This was followed by the Durrty Whirl mixtape in 2008, a re-release of the 2004 release, available for free download on the official Durrty Goodz website. In 2008, he was featured on Devlin's mixtape Art of Rolling on the track "Soundbwoy Murder".

In 2009, Mahorn released Ultrasound, a Pre-Album in the build-up to the debut album. This was followed by a free album entitled Born Blessed released in 2010. Durrty Goodz then began work on his debut album entitled Overall which was released in May 2011.

In 2010, he released a visual of "Gunshot" and "Childhood" from his Born Blessed mixtape. He released "Marijuana" in the same year. He featured on a Jailtales on the BBC in the same year.

He releases regular freestyles on his YouTube channel "Durrty Goodz FM", labelled Bar Codes.

In 2011, Mahorn featured on an all-star grime single titled "Pull Up 2011" alongside producer Dexplicit and other artists such as Big H, Big Narstie, Dot Rotten, Black the Ripper and Shizzle. In October 2011, he announced that his second album entitled Foundation would be released soon. He also appeared on Fire in the Booth with Charlie Sloth twice that year and did a Fast and Furious freestyle. He also did a freestyle for BBC Radio 1xtra. He released a visuals of "Oi Wot You Lookin At" and "Don't Ask Me".

On 11 March 2013, Mahorn released the free mixtape Young Legend followed by the sequel Young Legend 2 which was released on 31 March 2014 as a free download. Also in 2013, he was featured on M.S.G's mixtape Never Give Up, on "Krispy Kreme" with Logic, Last Resort, Sway, Mighty Moe and Big Frizzle and on "It's Alright" with DJ Ironik and AYO Beatz. He also released "City Rock" with Killa Mosquito under the name DG Da Guru. He was invited to host Lyric Lab with SB.TV and had talks with MCs such as Skibadee and Scruffizer.

On Christmas Day 2014, Mahorn released the mixtape Vintage 3000 for free and released visuals for the song on the EP. In December 2015, he was featured on LinkupSeason with Chip, Swiss, Black the Ripper, Flowdan and Rocks Foe. In 2016, he released "Vision" with L Dot Man. On 8 July 2016, he announced that he would be releasing a new EP titled Not Been Televised which was produced solely by YNR Productions rapper/producer Micall Parknsun. He released the first two tracks from the EP called "BMP" and "Organise" on 24 June 2016. Tru Thoughts announced that Goodz would release Hungry Belly which is a selection of grime standout tracks. This was released on 19 August 2016 alongside early radio support from Tom Ravenscroft of BBC6Music.

In 2017, Mahorn rebranded himself as "OG Rootz" and a collaborative EP with long-time rival Wiley was teased, but as of yet nothing has come to light. Under this new alias, Goodz featured on a song with rock band The Goldborns, as well as in songs with UK veteran TY, and more recently with Rag'n'Bone Man on Jam Baxter's 2018 album "Touching Scenes". For the two latter songs, videos were released onto YouTube.

In 2019, under this new alias, he released videos onto YouTube for the songs "Ackee & Rice", "Scotch Bonnet", "Frontline" and "Babylondon". These new songs all sample roots reggae songs with Goodz rhyming in a versatile ragga flow which he has done from early in his career.

In 2019, he released Bar Codes every week on his YouTube channel Durrty Goodz FM.

== Politics ==
In November 2019, Mahorn helped relaunch the Grime4Corbyn campaign to encourage young people to register to vote.

== Discography ==
=== Albums ===
- 2010: Born Blessed
- 2011: Overall
- 2025: Vanguard

=== EPs ===
- 2007: Axiom
- 2016: Not Been Televised
- 2019: Trinity (Free Download)

=== Mixtapes ===
- 2003: It's Real Vol. 1
- 2004: 2 Fast 2 Ferocious (with Skibadee)
- 2004: Durrty Whirl
- 2007: More Street Than The A-Z (hosted by DJ One Samurai)
- 2009: Ultrasound
- 2013: Young Legend (Free Download)
- 2014: Young Legend 2 (Free Download)
- 2014: Vintage 3000 (Free Download)
- 2015: Vintage 3000 Vol. 2 (Free Download)
- 2016: Hungry Belly
