= Protocol (band) =

British pop band

- Origin: United Kingdom
- Genre: Pop
- Years active: 2005–2006
- Label: Polydor
- Members: John Pritchard; James McMaster; Steven Oates; David Malik; Dominic Joseph

Protocol were a British pop group, who were formed in 2005. They were produced by Mike Peden. They consisted of:

- John Pritchard, lead vocals
- James McMaster, guitar
- Steven Oates, bass
- David Malik, keyboards/synthesizers
- Dominic Joseph, drums

The five-piece, who had been honing their craft since meeting four years earlier, ran their own club night, Vanity, in London. Protocol also toured with New Order, Fisherspooner, The Bravery, Hard-Fi and played the Wireless and V Festivals. The band were signed to Polydor Records, but were dropped in April 2006, although the band continued to tour before splitting up later that year.

Dominic Joseph, the drummer, went on to DJ and co-produce in Electro Duo Leatherhead, supporting Fatboy Slim, Chemical Brothers and Pete Tong, playing at Glasontbury Festival and Rockness Festival amongst others. and played drums for various artists including Lucie Silvas and Jamie Burke. Dominic is currently CEO & co-founder of the international Advertising Technology business, Captify.

== Discography ==
=== Albums ===
- 'Rules of Engagement' (2006) (Unreleased)

=== Singles ===
- "She Waits for Me" (2005) - UK #65
- "Where's the Pleasure" (2006) - UK #27
