= Sensations' Fix =

- Origin: Florence, Italy
- Genres: Progressive rock, electronic
- Years active: 1974-1979, 2000-present
- Labels: RCA

Sensations' Fix is an Italian progressive rock/electronic musical ensemble led by Franco Falsini.

== History ==
Falsini, born in Italy, moved to Virginia in 1969, where he set up a basement studio and experimented with a Moog and four-track taping before returning to Italy to form a band. The group signed with Polydor Records in 1974 to a five-year, six-album contract.

Sensations' Fix music remained out of print for many years, but in 2011, Naso Freddo was reissued by the Spectrum Spools label. In 2012, RVNG Records reissued some Sensations' Fix material along with alternate mixes and unreleased tracks on the compilation Music Is Painting in the Air (1974-1977).

== Members ==
- Franco Falsini
- Keith Edwards
- Richard Ursillo
- Stephen Head

== Discography ==
- Fragments of Light (Polydor Records, 1974)
- Portable Madness (Polydor, 1974)
- Naso Freddo (Polydor, 1975) (released under Franco Falsini's name)
- Finest Finger (Polydor, 1976)
- Vision's Fugitives (All Ears Records, 1977)
- Boxes Paradise (Polydor, 1977)
- Flying Tapes (Polydor, 1978)

== Influence ==
In 2002, DJ Shadow sampled Sensations' Fix on the tracks "Fixed Income" and "Mongrel...Meets His Maker" from The Private Press, and in 2008 Sonic Youth titled one of their art exhibitions "Sensational Fix".
