= Royal-T =

- Birth name: Mark Daniel Taylor
- Born: Southampton, England
- Genres: UK garage, grime, bassline
- Occupation(s): DJ, radio presenter, producer
- Years active: 2008–present
- Labels: Butterz, Rinse Recordings

Mark Daniel Taylor, professionally known as Royal-T, is a British UK garage, bassline and grime DJ and music producer from Southampton. He is signed to Butterz and Rinse Recordings.

Taylor was spotted in 2010 by Butterz label founders Elijah and Skilliam via the website Grime Forum. He later caught the attention of Rinse FM and started a regular 2-hour show on the station. In 2012, as well as remixes for DJ Zinc and Katy B's single "Easy Please Me", he released his first album on the Rinse Recordings label. In 2015, he established the supergroup TQD with fellow bassline and UK garage artists DJ Q and Flava D. He released one more solo single that same year, "Shotta", which Mixmag praised as being reminiscent to his earliest work.

== Work with TQD ==
TQD (often stylised as t q d or tqd) is a collaborative act that was formed in 2015, comprising Royal-T, DJ Q and Flava D, with the name TQD being an amalgamation of the last letter of each of their names. All three artists were already signed to the Butterz record label and thus all TQD releases have also been released on Butterz. The act play and produce the genres of music that the individuals do (such as UK garage, bassline and grime), however they have released experimental tracks that cross into many other genres.

In 2015, Royal-T and DJ Q were collaborating on their first project together and they asked Flava D if she wanted to join in on the project too. This would then go on to be their debut single "Day and Night", released on Butterz on 18 April 2015, both digitally and as a limited 500 copy vinyl pressing. This track was released as "Day and Night (Day Mix)", however an alternate mix of the single was also released on the B-side as "Day and Night (Night Mix)". Due to their solo efforts and differences in location however, TQD releases were sparse with their second track titled "Ghosts" being previewed digitally over a year later in 2016 and then being released on their second vinyl release "Only One/Ghosts".

The trio gained ample attention due to their releases and increasingly popular live sets and thus began working on an album together. This was formally announced at the beginning of 2017 to be a self-titled debut album, ukg, and would be released on 17 March 2017. The album contains features from P Money, Swindle and Skilliam and was met with generally positive reviews. Pitchfork called the track "Vibsing Ting" "strange and outstanding" and Mixmag said it consisted of "10 hard-hitting face melters". However, Clash magazine wrote that the album was "disappointingly short" and that "there’s a feeling that t q d aren’t really a case for three heads being better than one". The Bandcamp release of ukg contained three extra tracks that were not present on the vinyl or physical CD releases.

Though they have not made any official releases since their debut album as a trio, each member continues to produce and release music individually and the act still performs shows in many countries around the world, including the United Kingdom, Spain and Japan.

== Discography ==
Title	Date Label
1UP or Shatap EP	Released: 2009; Label: No Hats No Hoods
Damn It! EP	Released: 2010; Label: Boogaloo City
Orangeade EP	Released: 2011; Label: Butterz
Mood Swings VIP / Orangeade VIP	Released: 2011; Label: Butterz
Inside the Ride / Cool Down	Released: 2012; Label: Rinse
Rinse Presents Royal-T Album	Released: 2012; Label: Rinse
I Know You Want Me	Released: 2013; Label: Rinse
On My Mind with Flava D	Released: 2014; Label: Butterz
Shotta	Released: 2015; Label: Butterz
Shotta Remixes	Released: 2015; Label: Butterz
UKG Album	Released: 2017; Label: Butterz
Come My Way EP	Released: 2017; Label: Royal-T Music
Distortion (with Champion)	Released: 2018; Label: Royal-T Music
Clouds EP	Released: 2018; Label: Defected Records
Flat Shoe Riddim	Released: 2018; Label: Royal-T Music
Something For You EP	Released: 2019; Label: Royal-T Music
