= Nimco Happy =

Somali musical artist

- Born: Nimco Elmi Ali; Mogadishu, Somalia
- Genres: Pop
- Occupation: Singer
- Years active: 2015-present
- Label: Polydor Records

Nimco Elmi Ali (Somali: Nimco Cilmi Cali) better known by her stage name Nimco Happy, is a Somali singer known in her country for her numerous hits and has staged several plays in Somalia.

== Life and career ==
Happy was born in Mogadishu, Somalia, but grew up in Hargeisa and Nairobi, and now lives in Norway. She comes from an artistic family, mostly poets.

Happy started her career in 2015 but gained fame when she released "Isii Nafta" in 2017, the song become hit in Somalia. In 2021, Happy came to worldwide attention after "Isii Nafta", went viral on the video sharing platform TikTok. The song was noted for the fact that the singer sang in several languages, in particular, in addition to the main languages of Somali, in English, Swahili and Arabic. The success of the song led Happy to sign with record label Polydor and release the song officially on October 28 as "Isii Nafta (Love You More than My Life)" on Spotify and other music streaming service.

== Personal life ==
Happy was married but later divorced her husband with whom she had children. On 17 November 2021, she married her then boyfriend Abdalla Fabio.

== Discography ==
- Jab Iima Laabno · 2021
- Isii Nafta · 2021
