= Bruza =

British grime MC and rapper

- Also known as: Chigga D
- Born: Shaun Barker
- Origin: Walthamstow, London, England
- Genres: Grime, hip hop
- Occupation: Rapper
- Years active: 1992–present
- Formerly of: Aftershock

Shaun Barker, known by the stage name Bruza, is a British grime MC and rapper from Walthamstow, East London.

Bruza is known for rapping in a Cockney accent. Before grime music emerged in the early 2000s, Bruza was part of the drum and bass collective Reckless Crew going under the name of Chigga D.

His Christmas 2003 lyrical clash with Crazy Titch on a now defunct pirate radio station was captured on the DVD release of Lord of the Mics 1. He was briefly part of the Aftershock group before leaving. In early 2006, he collaborated with other grime artists to perform a fusion of grime and classical music at the Hackney Empire.

== Discography ==
=== Singles ===
- 2004: "Get Me"
- 2004: "Bruzin"

=== Collaborations ===
- 2018: "Grime Originals RMX" (Sharky Major feat. Manga, Fumin, Bruza & Maxwell D)
