= Stormin =

British musician

- Also known as: Teddy Bruckshot; Stormin
- Born: Shaun Lewis; 15 February 1984
- Origin: Plaistow, London, England
- Died: 19 February 2018 (aged 34)
- Genres: Grime; drum and bass; hip hop
- Occupations: MC, rapper
- Years active: 2000–2018
- Label: Major Muzik Entertainment
- Formerly of: YGS Crew; East Connection; Nasty Crew; SaSaSaS

Shaun Lewis (15 February 1984 – 19 February 2018), better known by the stage names Stormin and Teddy Bruckshot, was a British grime and drum and bass MC and rapper from Plaistow, London.

== Music ==
At the age of 13, Shaun began making a name for himself locally by participating in workshops within the London Borough of Newham at youth centres across the district. Stormin participated in a jungle rave called 'Kool Skool', wherein MC's from all around London would clash on stage, with the winner taking home £100 and a slot on Kool FM. After that, his name got around and Stormin was able to circuit various radio stations across London. After making waves across the numerous pirate radio stations, he co-founded Nasty Crew alongside Marcus Nasty and Sharky Major. The crew went on to recruit MCs such as Kano, D Double E, and Jammer.

His versatility and ability to MC across a range of different tempos earned him praise amongst his peers and listeners alike. As one of the earliest MC's to take UK garage instrumentals and use dark lyrics similar to US influenced hip hop it was this sound which saw the birth of grime. Early affiliates included Dizzee Rascal with whom he recorded one of his first ever tracks. In later years he was part of a group of jump-up MCs called SaSaSaS and also worked under an anonymous and masked alias Teddy Bruckshot inspired by Louie Rankin's character in the 2002 movie release Shottas releasing on labels such as Deep Medi Musik. Stormin won awards for Best DnB Group (with SaSaSaS) and 3 x Best Crowd Hype DnB MC in 2016, 2017 and posthumously at the 2018 Drum and Bass Awards.

== Illness and death ==
At 16 years old Shaun was diagnosed with lupus, which as a result left him with red patches on various parts of his face.

He was hospitalised with skin cancer in 2016 but was declared cancer-free later that same year. The cancer returned early in 2018 and he died in a hospice about a month later.

After his death, artists and fans mourned throughout social media including Skepta, Dizzee Rascal, Example and Rag N' Bone Man explaining the difference he had made to the UK underground music scene. The hashtag #BussIt, named for his 2015 single, trended on multiple social media platforms following his death along with #Stormin.

== Personal life ==
Stormin was of Dominican and Jamaican descent, with family from Clarendon.

== Discography ==
=== Mixtapes ===
- Hell Hath No Fury / Storm the Streets (with Lady Fury) (2005)
- Style Upon Style (2011)
- Black, Gold and Green (2012)
- Date of Birth (2013)
- The Trap Shop (2013)
- Strains (2014)
- #BRB (Be Right Back) (2016)
- Strains 2 (2016)
- Dabbin N Lean (2017)

=== EP ===
- "Nocturnal Insomniacs" (with SaSaSaS) (2018)

=== Singles ===
- "Fakes" / "9 Minute Slew" (with Nasty Jack) (2005)
- "Clocked On" (with Clipson) (2013)
- "Billson Skank" / "Bag of Ganja" (2013)
- "Buss It" (2015)
- "Sweet Like Drumz" (Prod. by Westy) (2016)
- "Topper Top" (as Teddy Bruckshot) (2016)
- "Cursed " (Prod. By Westy) (2016)
- "ANTHEM" (with SaSaSaS) (2016)
- "I Will live" (Prod. by Macky Gee) (2017)
- "RAMPAGE ANTHEM" (with SaSaSaS) (2017)
- "Force of Nature" (feat. Tayong) (2017)
- "Ten Out of Ten" (2017)
- "Money Gram" (with Jevvo) (2018)
- "Skip To Da Beat" (with SaSaSaS) (2018)
