= Crazy Titch =

Carl Dobson
- Carl Dobson in 2006

Background information
- Born: Carl Dobson; 31 January 1983 (age 43); Plaistow, London, England
- Genre: Grime
- Occupation: MC
- Years active: 2003–2005; 2005–present (sporadic)
- Labels: Aftershock Records; Lock Down Records
- Formerly of: Boyz In Da Hood

Carl Dobson (née Carl Nathaniel, 31 January 1983), better known by his stage name Crazy Titch, is a British grime MC who is, as of 2026, serving a life sentence for murder. Crazy Titch was a successful and well-known grime MC during his active period.

== Early life and education ==
Dobson was born in Plaistow, East London, to a mother of St. Lucian origin. As a teenager Dobson spent five years in Feltham and Aylesbury Young Offenders' Institute. On his release in 2003, Dobson turned his attention to grime music. Dobson became estranged from his brother, Durrty Goodz, during his childhood, but they later reconnected and became musical collaborators.

== Career ==
He gained underground fame due to his membership of grime collective Boyz In Da Hood, which included various artists including half-brother Durrty Goodz. Amongst his better known work was "Sing Along" (2004) and "Gully" on which he collaborated with Sugababes' Keisha Buchanan. He also produced a mixtape entitled Crazy Times Vol.1, and appeared on the grime DVD Practice Hours. In 2006 he made an appearance as himself along with many other MCs on the Channel 4 show Dubplate Drama. Crazy Titch had a reputation for violence during his time in the grime scene. Footage exists of a heated argument between Crazy Titch and Dizzee Rascal and of Crazy Titch allegedly kidnapping a rival and dumping them naked in the countryside.

== Imprisonment ==
Dobson and Anthony Green were sentenced to life imprisonment for the murder of 21-year-old Richard Holmes on the Chingford Hall estate in Chingford in November 2005. Possibility for parole was set at a minimum of 30 years by which time he will be in his 50s. Durrty Goodz was acquitted in the same trial and released a song about its events entitled "Letter 2 Titch" in 2007. The MAC-10 submachine gun used in the murder was found four years after the killing; in February 2009 a local drug dealer was sentenced to seven years imprisonment for its possession. In 2010, he released his second mixtape, a sequel to 2005's Crazy Times, with the material having been recorded while incarcerated. In 2017, Titch appeared on an interlude on Stormzy's album Gang Signs & Prayer, talking to Stormzy over the phone.

In 2020, a lyric video was produced, titled "Voldemort," which included new audio from Titch. It was uploaded to YouTube to celebrate Titch's birthday in 2020.

== Discography ==
=== Mixtapes ===
- 2005: Crazy Times, Vol. 1
- 2010: Crazy Times, Vol. 2

=== Singles ===
- 2003: "I Can C U, U Can C Me (Say My Name, Crazy T)"
- 2004: "Sing Along"
- 2020: "Voldemort"
- 2020: "Puff Chest"

=== Appeared on ===
- 2004: Aim High Volume 1 by Danny Weed and Target
- 2005: Aim High Volume 2 by Danny Weed and Target
- 2009: Hardrive by Terror Danjah
- 2010: Born Blessed by Durrty Goodz
- 2011: Porridge by Stanaman
- 2017: Gang Signs & Prayer by Stormzy
