= DJ Q =

British DJ and record producer (born 1985)

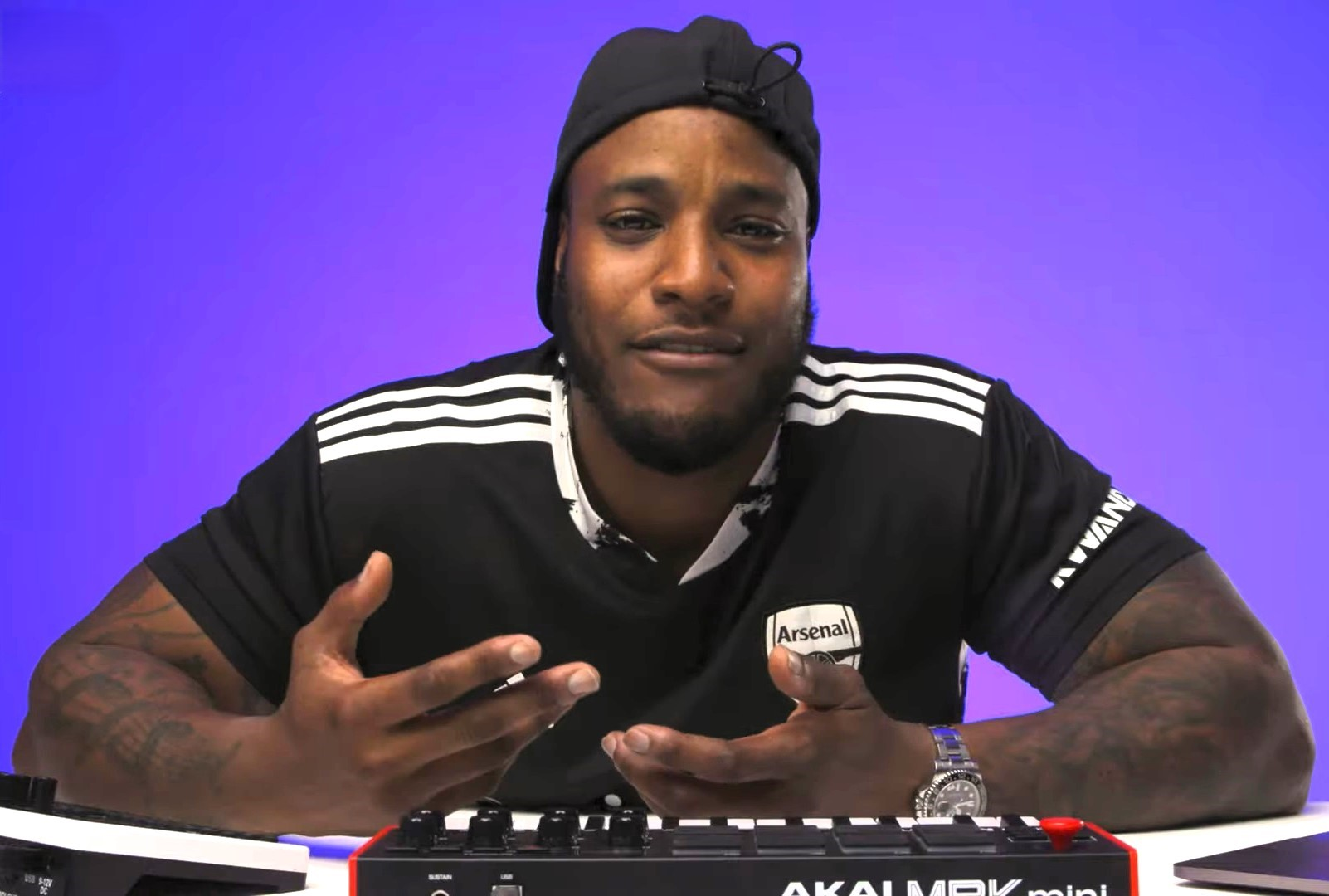
- DJ Q teaches online course in 2023

Background information
- Born: Shollen Quarshie; 16 August 1985 (age 41); Huddersfield, West Yorkshire, England
- Genres: Bassline, grime
- Occupations: DJ, radio presenter, producer
- Years active: 1998–present
- Labels: Q Recordings, Party Like Us, Local Action, Butterz

Shollen Quarshie (born 16 August 1985), known by his stage name DJ Q, is a DJ and record producer from Huddersfield, England. He forms part of the supergroup TQD alongside Flava D and Royal-T.

== Early life ==
DJ Q's musical journey started from a young age at The Nook in Holmfirth, listening to music played by his parents. It was at the age of 12 when 'Q' first got involved with the UK garage scene, buying vinyl and tape packs. When his vinyl collection grew larger Q finally got a pair of record decks in his bedroom. After teaching himself to mix, Q started to get bookings at local parties at the age of 15, before learning to produce music the next year at college.

== Career ==
Q's break on radio came in 2004, when a friend working at BBC Radio 1Xtra informed him that the station were looking for a new DJ on the pulse of the rising bassline scene in the North of England. He submitted a mix CD, and Q eventually became the youngest DJ at 1Xtra, hosting the fortnightly UKG Mix Show.

It was around the same time Q released his first vinyl, "Love Like This (The Reasons)" which was a big hit in the bassline scene. This brought him more bookings at bassline events and as time passed, Q produced more hits such as "Tea Bag", "Dirty" and later "You Wot!", which was signed and released via Ministry of Sound. "You Wot!" made the UK top 50 upon its release in summer 2008, which led to remix work for the likes of Amy Winehouse, Dizzee Rascal, Keri Hilson and Katy B to name a few.

Q continued to host his BBC 1Xtra show – by now a weekly broadcast - throughout his mainstream success, and frequently appeared on sister station BBC Radio 1 for guest mixes, before his departure in 2012 after 8 years at the station. He soon began a new monthly show on Ministry of Sound Radio, presenting the Essential Garage show.

Recent years have seen an increase in new productions from Q, with over 10 digital single and EP releases since 2012 that cross a broad spectrum of dance music. These include "Say to You" (released under the alias Classified), the Sound Boy Connection EP via US label Party Like Us, and three singles from his debut album via Local Action Records.

During his years in the music industry, Q has also played music in countries across the globe and Europe particularly, with sets in places such as Ibiza, Amsterdam, Italy, Russia, Australia and the United States.

== Work with TQD ==
TQD (often stylised as t q d or tqd) is a collaborative act that was formed in 2015, comprising Royal-T, DJ Q and Flava D, with the name TQD being an amalgamation of the last letter of each of their names. All three artists were already signed to the Butterz record label and thus all TQD releases have also been released on Butterz. The act play and produce the genres of music that the individuals do (such as UK garage, bassline and grime), however they have released experimental tracks that cross into many other genres.

In 2015, Royal-T and DJ Q were collaborating on their first project together and they asked Flava D if she wanted to join in on the project too. This would then go on to be their debut single "Day and Night", released on Butterz on 18 April 2015, both digitally and as a limited 500 copy vinyl pressing. This track was released as "Day and Night (Day Mix)", however an alternate mix of the single was also released on the B-side as "Day and Night (Night Mix)". Due to their solo efforts and differences in location however, TQD releases were sparse with their second track titled "Ghosts" being previewed digitally over a year later in 2016 and then being released on their second vinyl release Only One/Ghosts.

The trio gained ample attention due to their releases and increasingly popular live sets and thus began working on an album together. This was formally announced at the beginning of 2017 to be the debut album, ukg and would be released on 17 March 2017. The album contains features from P Money, Swindle and Skilliam and was met with generally positive reviews. Pitchfork called the track "Vibsing Ting" "strange and outstanding" and Mixmag said it consisted of "10 hard-hitting face melters." However, Clash magazine wrote that the album was "disappointingly short" and that "there’s a feeling that t q d aren’t really a case for three heads being better than one." The Bandcamp release of ukg contained three extra tracks that were not present on the vinyl or physical CD releases.

Though they have not made any official releases since their debut album as a trio, each member continues to produce and release music individually and the act still performs shows in many countries around the world, including the United Kingdom, Spain and Japan.

== Discography ==
=== Albums ===
- The Archive (2012)
- Ineffable (2014)

=== Singles ===
Title	Year	Peak chart positions	Album
Title	Year	UK	Album
"You Wot"	2008	50	Non-album singles
"Over Me" (feat. Louise Williams)	2011	—	Non-album singles
"Dibby Dibby Sound / Swing"	2012	—	Non-album singles
"All Junglist"	2012	—	Non-album singles
"Party Time"	2013	—	Non-album singles
"Say to You" (as Classified)	2013	—	—
"Trust Again" (feat. Louise Williams)	2013	—	Ineffable
"Through the Night" (feat. Louise Williams)	2013	—	Ineffable
"Let the Music Play" (feat. Louise Williams)	2013	—	Ineffable
"Oh My God" (DJ Q vs. Natalie Duncan)	2015	—	Non-album single

=== EPs ===
- Q Bass Trax 1 (2013)
- Sound Boy Connection EP (2013)
- Love Keeps Changing (2013) - [Trumpet & Badman, with DJ Haus]
- A440 (2023) (Collaboration with Tofubeats)
