= Vector Meldrew =

British artist and creative executive

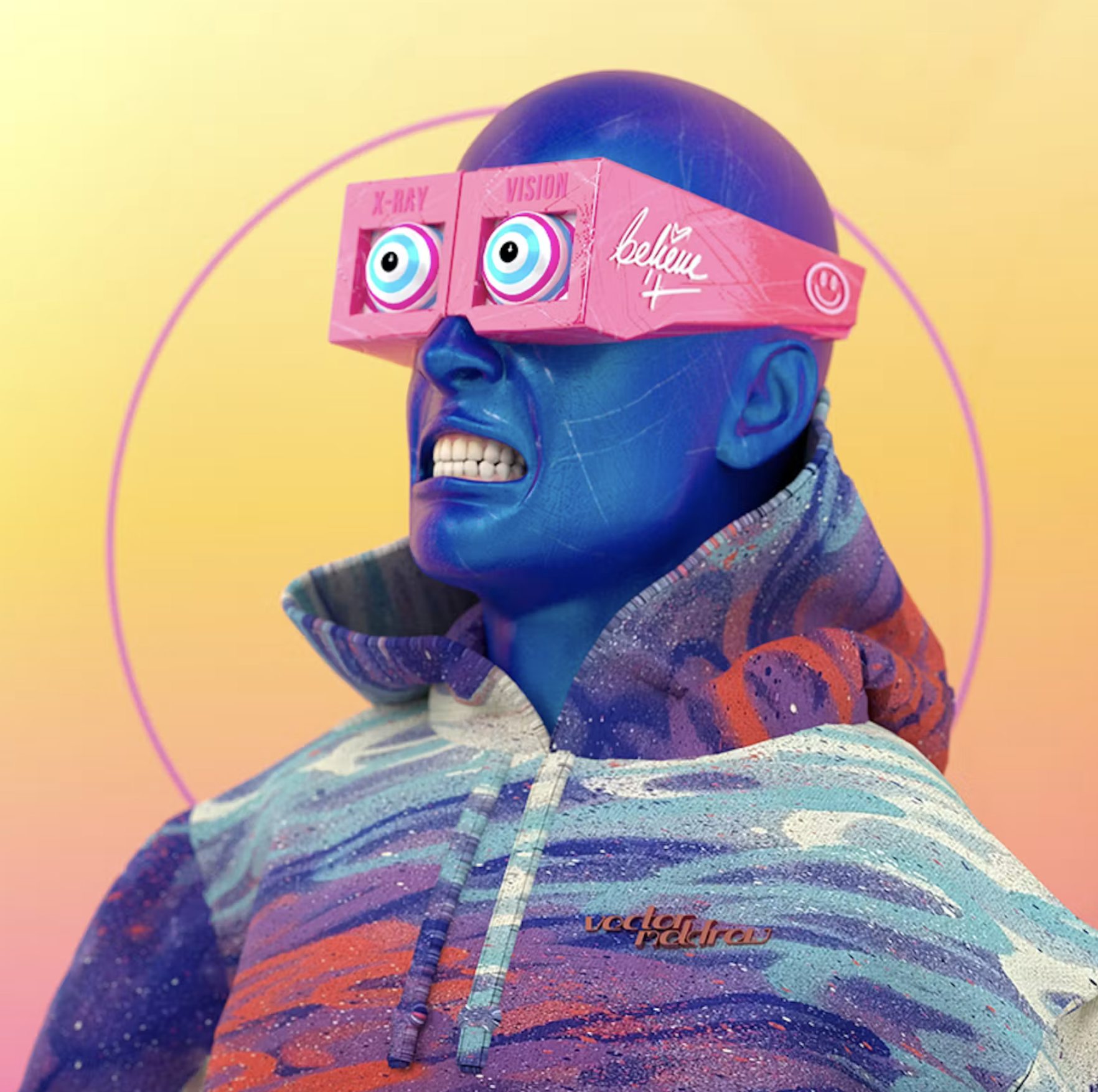
- Born: 1984 (age 41–42); London
- Education: UWE Bristol
- Occupation: British Artist
- Years active: 2001 - Present
- Notable work: RWDmag, RWD Forum, Booo Krooo, James Bond Goldeneye, Broadside, Addison Groove
- Awards: Prince's Trust London Business of the Year, 2004, Ernst & Young Future 100, LA Shorts Awards, 2017, Vimeo Staff Pick, Lisbon Film Festival
- Website: https://vectormeldrew.com/

Vector Meldrew is a British artist and creative executive working in sculpture, NFT, and generative AI art. In 2001, he co-founded the grime website RWDmag.com and its associated RWD forum, both of which became central to the early UK grime and UK garage scene.

He was a former lecturer at the Swedish design institute Hyper Island. He has auctioned work at Bonhams, and in 2026 his web animation series The Booo Krooo was acquired by the BFI National Archive as part of its Online Video collection..

== Career ==
=== UK grime and RWD Magazine (2001–2004) ===
In 2001, Vector became a founding member of RWD Magazine created to push UK garage, grime and dubstep, and RWD became the first platform to champion grime music and feature UK artists Dizzee Rascal, Skepta and Tinchy Stryder.

During this period the website received London Business of the Year, UK Garage Awards : Best Website 2002 and Sidewinder Peoples Choice Awards : Best Magazine 2003 "Ernst & Young Future 100" Award in 2011.

=== The Booo Krooo and BFI National Archive acquisition (2001–2026) ===
In 2026, The Booo Krooo - the web animation series Meldrew co-created, later commissioned as a Channel U television series - was acquired by the BFI National Archive as part of its Online Video collection, a Screen Heritage Fund–supported collection documenting the development of British online video as a distinct screen form..

Channel U commissioned Vector's first animation series working in collaboration with Matt Mason (writer) and Julian Johnson (Art). Taking hints from underground music culture and the intersection between UK Garage and Grime, the 3 episode web series was shortly co-signed by Missy Elliott after her PR team asked to feature the artist as part of the campaign for her hit single 'Work It'. The series then acquired a 6-episode deal on Channel U (now named Total Country) and recorded a music video with UK Garage producer 'Sticky' known for hits such as Ms Dynamite's track (also named) 'Boo'. Music publication Ransom Note cited the series as the first 'grime comedy' saying it was 'essentially a proto(type) version of People Just Do Nothing"

=== Motion graphics, film and consulting (2007-2017) ===
Vector worked as a motion graphics director with video game developer Eurocom, commissioned by Activision to work with the James Bond franchise to develop GoldenEye 007 and 007 Legends.

From 2009 to 2013 Vector worked as a freelance consultant providing strategy for various fashion brands creating campaigns such as the 'adidas About to Blow London Olympics 2012' campaign featuring Tinie Tempah and Mo Farah. He created a handful of films entitled 'Monotone' 'Monkey Business' and 'Do Not Feed The Horses'. Screenings include : AniFest, Resfest, British Film Council and Channel Frederator The business school Hyper Island recruited Vector between 2014 and 2017 to teach 'storytelling' to the motion creative course in Stockholm/Karlskrona.

=== Dubstep and electronic music collaborations (2010-2017) ===
Vector was responsible for design collaborations with dubstep / techno artists such as Appleblim, Headhunter, Pinch, Komonazmuk, Joker (Kapsize) and 2562. The most notable being an Audio Visual live show with Headhunter (Tempa) now called Addison Groove. He also directed music videos for Appleblim and Addison Groove. The most notable was 'Changa' which premiered on the Adult Swim YouTube Channel and gained official selection status and was nominated for awards at Aesthetica, London Short Film Festival, Berlin Music Video Awards, The Smalls, Stockholm Independent Film Festival. His work has been mentioned in books including: Dubstep Graphics and Contemporary Colour Theory. Artwork has been featured in Vice Adult Swim Tech Crunch and includes collaborations with musician Tinie Tempah.

=== NFT and digital art (2021 - present) ===
Visual Atelier described Meldrew as 'crafting visionary worlds around contemporary cultural themes.' In auction materials for the 2021 Bonhams sale, the work was described as taking place in 'an imagined metaverse,' framed as prompting viewers to question their sense of reality.

In June 2021, Meldrew took part in a week-long NFT art residency at the Grand Hôtel du Cap-Ferrat in the French Riviera, alongside painter Sassan Behnam-Bakhtiar and musician Tinie Tempah, curated by Kamiar Maleki and moderated by auctioneer Simon de Pury. The Art Newspaper wrote that Meldrew's imagery in the resulting piece - hooded figures in shimmering tracksuits alongside Tempah's face - showed how far he had come from his teenage years documenting London's grime scene on pirate radio and early websites, describing the result as a 'retro-futuristic NFT.'"

Meldrew co-created Broadside and Basejump, a solarpunk-themed NFT project combining collectible 3D artwork, a video game and generative AI elements, with proceeds tied to Amazon rainforest conservation efforts

In 2021, Meldrew produced a series of augmented-reality paste-ups and stickers in Shoreditch, London, featured by Shoreditch Street Art Tours.
