= Sticky (musician) =

UK garage DJ and producer

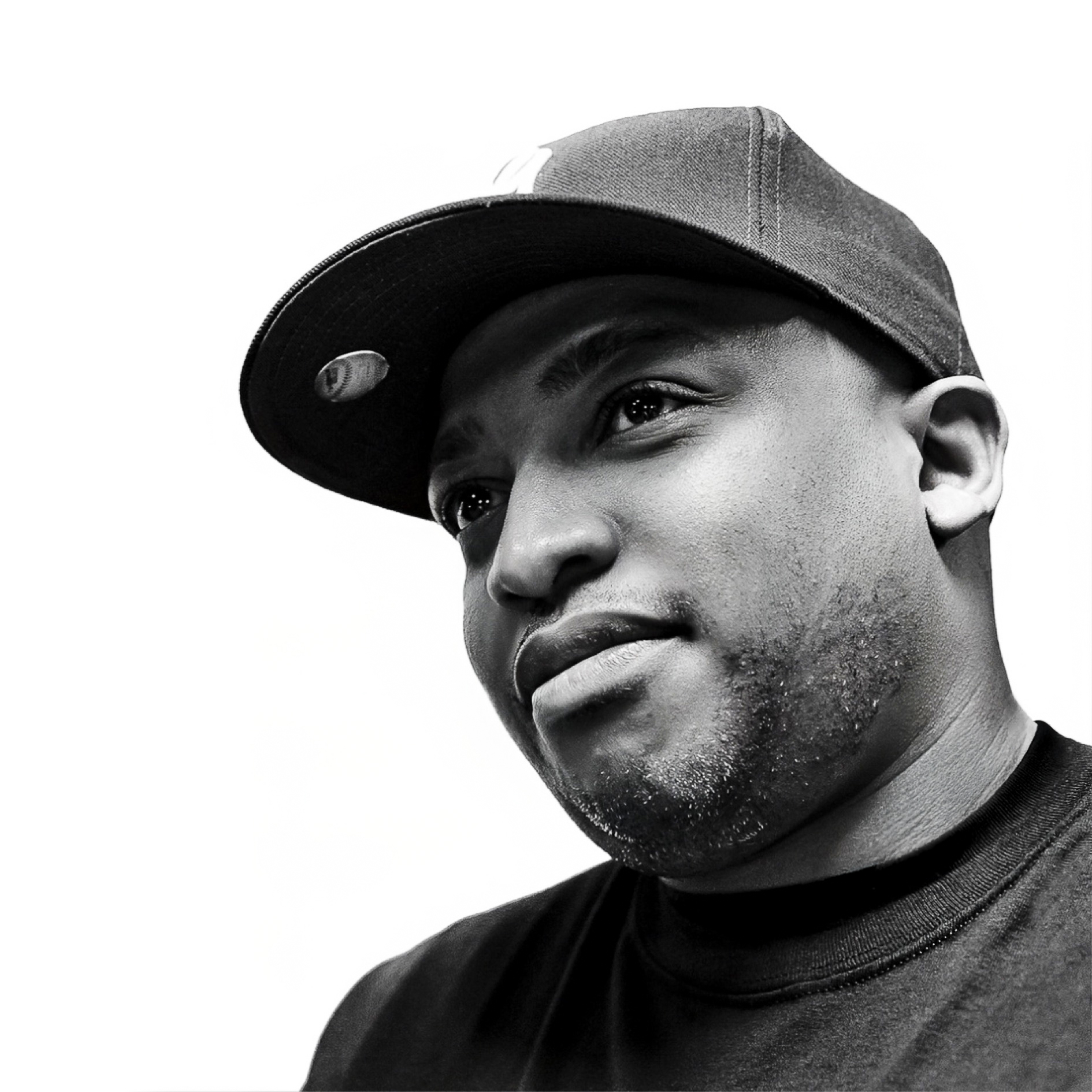
DJ and producer Sticky

Sticky (born Richard Forbes) is a British DJ and record producer associated with UK garage, grime and dancehall-influenced music. Emerging from the UK underground scene in the 1990s, he became a prominent figure in the development of UK garage during its commercial breakthrough in the early 2000s. He is best known for the 2001 single "Booo!" featuring Ms. Dynamite, which reached number 12 on the UK Singles Chart and number one on the UK Dance Singles Chart, and for the influential track "Triplets", as well as "Things We Do" featuring Kele Le Roc.

== Early life ==
Forbes' interest in music began in 1978 at the age of five, when he started buying vinyl records with his pocket money. His grandmother, a record collector, encouraged his interest by giving him her own collection and continuing to purchase records for him. By childhood, he had already developed a strong instinct for commercially successful music, often selecting songs that later became chart hits.

== Production work ==
During the mid-1990s, Forbes began exploring music production, initially learning in studio environments associated with reggae and UK hip hop artists, including work alongside Maxi Priest and early-career collaborators such as Ty and Blak Twang. In 1997, he spent time in Jamaica working at Freddie McGregor's studio, where he developed an interest in MPC-based beat production.

Sticky later entered the UK garage scene, working at Wax City Records and collaborating with producers, MCs and songwriters associated with the genre. His first UK garage release, "What's It Gonna Be" by Nesha, reportedly sold approximately 12,000 copies, marking his emergence as a producer within the scene.

Sticky produced the chart singles "Tales of the Hood" by Tubby T and "Hype! Hype!" by SLK, and has remixed tracks by artists including Britney Spears, Justin Timberlake, Aaliyah, Sugababes, Hot Chip, Beenie Man, Erykah Badu and Tulisa.

== Breakthrough and recognition ==
Sticky achieved wider recognition through his collaboration with Ms. Dynamite on the track "Booo!", which began as a dubplate before gaining underground popularity and commercial release. The single reached number 12 on the UK Singles Chart and number one on the UK Dance Singles Chart.

By 2002, Sticky had produced and remixed numerous tracks and became associated with the crossover between UK garage and the emerging grime sound.

In 2002, he worked with RWD Magazine team members Matt Mason and Lex Johnson to record the theme song and music video for The Booo Krooo, the first grime comedy series commissioned by Channel U.

== Later career ==
Following a period of high output and industry attention, Sticky reduced his public profile to focus on family life and other musical directions, including pop and underground projects. He later returned to performing at festivals and collaborating with other artists such as Kiss FM DJ and "It's a London Thing" producer Scott Garcia and Dr. Psycho as part of the collective, Foundation.

In 2013, Sticky appeared alongside several UK garage pioneers in the documentary Rewind 4Ever: The History of UK Garage, which explored the genre’s cultural impact and legacy.

A later collaboration in 2014 with General Levy resulted in the track "Pull Up", which was featured on MistaJam's radio show Grime Takeover alongside Levy's jungle hit "Incredible". The appearance gained significant online attention and marked a renewed phase of activity in General Levy's career.

== Discography ==
=== Singles ===
- "Booo!" (featuring Ms. Dynamite) (2001) - UK #12, UK Dance #1
- "Jawz" (2001)
- "Triplets"/"Triplets II" (2001) - UK Indie #26
- "Stuck to the Floor"/"Joy Dub" (2001)
- "Triplets III" (2001)
- "Pacman"/"Golly Gosh" (2002)
- "Ganjaman" (featuring Tubby T) (2003)
- "Things We Do for Love" (featuring Kele Le Roc) (2003)
- "Sleng"/"Bomb Shell" (2003)
- "Golly Gosh 2"/"Golly Gosh Remix (Mr Fidgit)" (2004)
- "Sticky Situationz" (2006)
- "Pedal Rhythm" (2013)
- "Pull Up" (featuring General Levy) (2014)
- "Day One" (with Double S) (2022)

=== Productions ===
- Nesha - "What's It Gonna Be" (1999/2001) - UK R&B #9
- Stush - "Dollar Sign" (2001) - UK Indie #46
- Tubby T - "Tales of the Hood" (2002) - UK #47, UK Dance #7
- SLK - "Hype! Hype!" (2004) - UK #22, UK Dance #3
- Nio - "Music Ain't Dead" (2004)
