= Dotmusic =

1995–2003 British music webzine

Dotmusic was a music webzine that existed as a standalone website from 1 June 1995 to December 2003. Initially intended as the web complement to the UK music industry trade magazine Music Week, the site was relaunched in December 1998 as a website for music fans, with features, interviews and the UK charts. The site was edited by Andy Strickland, and among its most prominent writers were Nimalan Nadesalingam (Nimalan Nades), who contributed artist biographies, and James Masterton, who contributed a weekly UK chart commentary. After an internship in summer 2000, Alex Donne Johnson used his experience at Dotmusic to go on and found the urban music website RWDmag, which later become one of the key players in the development of grime, UK garage and dubstep online.

Dotmusic included one of the earliest pay download music services, Dotmusic On Demand. It was also famous for its discussion forum, one of the most popular and active message boards in the UK. As well as forums devoted to various artists, there was a free-for-all, off-topic forum called Dotmusic Lite, known as DotLite for short. A number of DotCons - conventions for Dotmusic users - were held in cities around the UK from 1999 onwards.

There was a major online marketing campaign in 1999, followed by a TV press and online campaign in 2000. The site was regularly in the top ten sites for children.

Dotmusic was originally owned by Miller Freeman, Inc., before being sold to BT in 2002. In 2003, the site was sold to Yahoo! and subsequently incorporated into Yahoo!'s UK based music portal, UK Launch. The main Dotmusic site shut down at the end of 2003. The regular forum posters created a number of replacement boards in an effort to retain the community.
