= SLK (group) =

British grime group

- Origin: London, England
- Genres: Grime
- Years active: 2001–2007
- Labels: Smoove; Pitch Controller
- Members: Flirta D Van Damage; Ribz; Skrapz; Swarvo; Big Mighty; Shiesty Shadz; Pistol; DJ Vectra; DJ Mondie; DJ Policy

SLK (an acronym for So Low Key and Street Life Kings) were a British grime crew from Northwest London. Their debut single "Hype! Hype!", produced by Sticky and featuring Lady Envy, reached No. 22 on the UK Singles Chart and No. 3 on the UK Dance Singles Chart. In 2014, Complex magazine included the video for "Hype! Hype!" in their list of "15 Channel U Videos We Will Never Forget".

The crew were known for clashing rival MCs, including Roll Deep and Skepta. A freestyle by several members appeared on the 2006 DVD Risky Roadz 2. They disbanded in 2007.

== Members ==
=== SLK ===
- Flirta D
- Van Damage - also known as Adam B
- Ribz
- Skrapz
- Beenie Battleaxe - also known as EC and Elliot Clinch
- BMD - also known as Big Man Diggy
- Big Mighty - also known as Tinster
- Shiesty Shadz
- Swarvo
- Skuffer - also known as SKU
- Lady Envi
- DJ Vectra
- DJ Mondie
- DJ Policy - also known as Pistol PP

=== Younger SLK ===
- J Money
- Blacks
- King Craze
- Vager
- Era Monster
- Iceman
- DJ Tallboy
