= Lex Johnson =

British designer and creative director

- Born: London, United Kingdom
- Citizenship: UK
- Education: UWE Bristol
- Occupations: Director and Designer
- Notable work: RWD Magazine | The Booo Krooo | GoldenEye 007 | DAZZLE SHIP | Drone Racing League | Hyper Island

Lex Johnson is a British designer, director and creative executive. He is the founder of creative agency DAZZLE SHIP, a former lecturer at Swedish design institute Hyper Island, and the founding online director of RWD magazine and RWD Forum.

== Career ==
=== RWD Online / RWD forum ===
In 2001, Johnson became founding Online Director of RWD magazine created to push UK garage, grime and dubstep, and RWD became the first platform to champion grime music and feature UK artists Dizzee Rascal, Skepta and Tinchy Stryder.

The RWD forum is mentioned in grime MC's lyric; the most notable incidents were in its earlier years when Wiley would frequently post and often argue or troll with users. In the book This is Grime by Hattie Collins, Wiley states "the RWD forum was a good place" and Matt Mason added "Grime had always been a conversation and Alex understood this and grew RWD forums, making RWD one of the most popular music websites in the UK"

During this period the website received London Business of the Year, UK Garage Awards : Best Website 2002 and Sidewinder Peoples Choice Awards : Best Magazine 2003. Johnson was also personally awarded an "Ernst & Young Future 100" Award in 2011.

=== The Booo Krooo ===
The Booo Krooo was an adult animated TV series. Lex Johnson was the producer/animator working in collaboration with Matt Mason (writor) and Julian Johnson (Art). Taking hints from underground music culture and the intersection between UK Garage and Grime, the 3 episode web series was shortly co-signed by Missy Elliott after her PR team asked to feature the artist as part of the campaign for her hit single 'Work It'. The series then acquired a 6-episode deal on Channel U (now named Total Country) and recorded a music video with UK Garage producer 'Sticky' known for hits such as Ms Dynamite's track (also named) 'Boo'. Music publication Ransom Note cited the series as the first 'grime comedy' saying it was 'essentially a proto(type) version of People Just Do Nothing"

=== Creative consultant ===
From 2009 - 2013 Johnson worked as a freelance consultant providing strategy for various fashion brands creating campaigns such as the 'adidas About to Blow London Olympics 2012' campaign featuring Tinie Tempah and Mo Farah.

=== Dubstep / EDM / Grime ===
Johnson was responsible for design collaborations with dubstep / techno artists such as Appleblim, Headhunter, Pinch, Komonazmuk, Joker (Kapsize) and 2562. The most notable being an Audio Visual live show with Headhunter (Tempa) now called Addison Groove. He also directed music videos for Appleblim and Addison Groove. The most notable was 'Changa' which premiered on the Adult Swim YouTube Channel and gained official selection status and was nominated for awards at Aesthetica, London Short Film Festival, Berlin Music Video Awards, The Smalls, Stockholm Independent Film Festival. His work has been mentioned in books including: Dubstep Graphics and Contemporary Colour Theory. Artwork has been featured in Vice Adult Swim Tech Crunch and includes collaborations with musician Tinie Tempah.

=== James Bond - GoldenEye ===
Johnson worked as a motion graphics director with video game developer Eurocom, commissioned by Activision to work with the James Bond franchise to develop GoldenEye 007 and 007 Legends.

=== Animation / Short Films ===
He created a handful of films entitled 'Monotone' 'Monkey Business' and 'Do Not Feed The Horses'. Screenings include : AniFest, Resfest, British Film Council and Channel Frederator He was invited to resident at The Pervasive Media studio in Bristol as part of art collective 'Lumiere Digitale' as Technical Director and Developer, Johnson was responsible for animation and visual art direction.

=== Hyper Island ===
The business school Hyper Island recruited Johnson between 2014–2017 to teach 'storytelling' to the motion creative course in Stockholm/Karlskrona.

=== DAZZLE SHIP ===
In 2013, Johnson founded the design and motion graphics studio - DAZZLE SHIP. The studio divides its time between self initiated projects and client service work. Their clients include Wateraid, Bloomberg, SAP, The Drone Racing League and Blockchain. Their most recent work includes branding the sport of the future 'Drone Racing'
