= Channel U =

Channel U may refer to these television channels:

- Channel U (Singaporean TV channel), a Chinese-language channel
- Channel U (UK) a former UK music video channel from 2003 to 2009
- Channel U, a 2025 album by Ryokuoushoku Shakai
