= Eskimo (grime beat) =

Song by Wiley
- Released: July 2002 (UK)
- Recorded: Late 1999
- Genre: Grime; eskibeat
- Label: Wiley Kat Recordings
- Songwriter(s): Richard Cowie

"Eskimo" is an instrumental grime beat by the East London producer and MC Wiley, first released on 12" vinyl in July 2002. The song was originally produced in the Christmas of 1999 or 2000.

"Eskimo" is considered to be a landmark release being one of the earliest and most influential examples of grime music and an archetype for its eskibeat subgenre. It was the first and best known release in Wiley's series of eskibeat instrumentals on white label vinyl which had a long term influence on the development of the grime sound.

The original "Eskimo" track was remixed multiple times; Wiley also released multiple sequel tracks: "Eskimo 2", "Eskimo 3" and "Eskimo 4". Wiley's collaborator Skepta also made a mash up of "Eskimo" and Musical Mob's "Pulse X", considered another important early grime release, called "Gun Shot Riddim" and colloquially known as "Pulse Eskimo".
