= Tubby T =

English singer songwriter

Tubby T (born Anthony Emanuel Robinson, 9 September 1974 – 22 May 2008) was an English reggae, dancehall, garage and grime MC and singer from Brent, London. His 2002 single "Tales of the Hood", produced by Sticky, reached No. 47 on the UK Singles Chart and No. 7 on the UK Dance Singles Chart. The following year, he featured on the single "Big N Bashy" by rapper Fallacy which reached No. 45 on the UK Singles Chart. As well as Sticky, Tubby T worked with other artists such as MJ Cole, Sweetie Irie, Ms. Dynamite and Buju Banton.

Robinson died on 22 May 2008, after suffering his second stroke in four years.
