= Channel U (UK) =

British music television channel

Channel U logo

Channel U (later known as Channel AKA) was a British digital satellite TV music channel that focused on the British grime scene which ran from February 2003 to June 2018.

Channel U was a significant outlet not only for established artists, but also for those who were just starting out, helping the breakthrough for acts such as Tinchy Stryder, Tinie Tempah, Dizzee Rascal, Chip, Wretch 32, Devlin, Giggs, Skepta and N-Dubz. Its material included "crude productions shot with handheld digital video cameras," and helped new musicians attract attention and build a fan base. According to its website, "the aim of the channel was to highlight to the public, the raw and unsigned talent we have in the UK, and give them a platform from which they could perform," and it was successful in this mission, as suggested by the production and popularity of such compilation CDs as Channel U: The Album.

Many artists have expressed their loyalty to the channel in their lyrics; for example, in Lady Sovereign's "9 to 5", "Channel who? Oh Channel U, the ones who made me huge, like Katie Price's boobs!". Other artists to comment on Channel U include Kano, Ironik, Lethal Bizzle, Sway, Remi Nicole, Mr Wong, and Dizzee Rascal. Dan le sac vs Scroobius Pip criticised Channel U in their song "Fixed", as did Lowkey, who cited the absence of any innovation and the channel's lack of desire to take risks.

Channel U commissioned the first 'grime comedy', an animated adult sitcom named The Booo Krooo. The TV series ran for six episodes and focused on the misadventures of three young MCs trying to break into the music game, but often ending up worse off than when they started. The Booo Krooo was originally a cult classic to readers of RWD Magazine and got the attention of Channel U after being co-signed by Missy Elliott. The animation series was developed by Matt Mason and Alex Donne Johnson with illustrations by Julian Johnson, a.k.a. Art Jaz.

In October 2005, the first annual Channel U Awards were held in London with live performances from its underground playlist.

Before he joined MTV to host the British version of Pimp My Ride, Tim Westwood had a show on the then Channel U. Following the Westwood show, the channel developed its programming by licensing a lifestyle TV series, The Ballers Show, in 2006. The 30-minute show presented the lives of footballers off the pitch including the Premier League footballer Jermain Defoe.

On 14 July 2016, the channel's co-founder, Darren Platt, died. In his obituary in The Guardian, the newspaper stated that Channel U "forged a place for a genre that began its life ignored by the mainstream."

The parent company of Fizz TV and Channel U went into voluntary liquidation at the beginning of February 2009, before being purchased by Mushroom TV. When purchasing the two channels, Mushroom TV agreed that Channel U and Fizz TV should be rebranded. The two channels were rebranded as Channel AKA and Starz TV on 16 March 2009.

On 22 June 2012, Mushroom TV entered liquidation. Ofcom's television broadcast licensing update for May 2012 indicated that Channel AKA was sold to All Around the World Productions, who at the time owned Clubland TV and Massive R&B (now Now 90s) and had also acquired Greatest Hits TV under UltimateHits Limited. On 29 November 2012, the channel launched on Freesat but was removed on 15 April 2013. The channel returned to Freesat on 1 October 2015 alongside its sister channels Chilled TV, Clubland TV and Now Music, before being removed again on 12 May 2017.

In 2018, Channel AKA ceased broadcasting and has since been remembered for introducing the music careers of artists such as Dizzee Rascal, Kano, Wiley and Lethal Bizzle. Even a mainstream artist such as Ed Sheeran was initially championed by Channel AKA, which played the video for "The A Team" for some time before it charted.

On 25 September 2020, it was confirmed that Channel U would be returning to TV on 13 November 2020 to promote the film Against All Odds. Due to technical issues, the return was postponed to 20 November 2020, and it aired for six hours on Clubland TV.
