= Sassan Behnam-Bakhtiar =

Iranian-French artist

- Born: February 1, 1984 (age 42); Neuilly-sur-Seine, Paris, France
- Education: American University in Dubai; Monaco Business School (International University of Monaco)

Sassan Behnam-Bakhtiar (Persian: ساسان بھنام بختیار) is an Iranian-French multidisciplinary artist who lives in the south of France. Behnam-Bakhtiar is primarily known for his oil paintings created in his signature style of peinture raclée, collage works and films.

== Early life and education ==
Sassan Behnam-Bakhtiar was born in the Parisian suburb of Neuilly-sur-Seine in 1984, during the middle of the Iran–Iraq War. Through his mother, Firouzeh Bakhtiar-Bakhtiariha, he traces his descent from Iran's ancient Bakhtiari tribe. His great-grandfather General Gholam-Hossein Khan Bakhtiar (Sardar Mohtashem), was Iran's Minister of War, while his grandfather Abdolhamid Bakhtiar was a Majles deputy. Many of his other relatives, such as the late Iranian Prime Minister Shapour Bakhtiar and General Teymour Bakhtiar (two of his great-uncles), as well as the second wife of Mohammad Reza Pahlavi, Queen Soraya Esfandiary-Bakhtiari, to name a few, were also notable figures in the Pahlavi and Qajar eras. Through his father, he is a descendant of the Qajar monarch Ahmad Shah.

Although born in Paris, Behnam-Bakhtiar spent his formative years in Tehran, and, at the age of nineteen, moved to nearby Dubai to study at the American University in Dubai (AUD). Later on, with his wife, Maria Zakharchenko, he relocated to Saint-Jean-Cap-Ferrat in France continuing his studies at the nearby Principality of Monaco to obtain his MBA at the International University of Monaco.

== Career ==
Behnam-Bakhtiar's early works—mostly paintings—were largely informed by Iranian icons and imagery, and were first shown at Magic of Persia's auction in Dubai in 2009. Shortly afterwards, he produced two series regarding the Iran-Iraq War (A Reason to Fight and Aftermath), as well as the autobiographical The Real Me, which brought to the fore various aspects of his identity and scenes of historical Iran. In The Real Me Behnam-Bakhtiar developed his signature style of pairing black-and-white photography with vibrant collage cut-outs adorned with traditional Iranian patterns and motifs.

His works have been exhibited in solo and group exhibitions in London, New York, Los Angeles, Dusseldorf, Monaco, Dubai, Abu Dhabi, and Tehran. They have also been widely sold by the auction houses Phillips (auctioneers), Bonhams, Christie's, and Artnet.

In June 2021, Behnam-Bakhtiar took part in a week-long NFT art residency at the Grand Hôtel du Cap-Ferrat in the French Riviera, alongside musician Tinie Tempah and digital artist Vector Meldrew, curated by Kamiar Maleki and moderated by auctioneer Simon de Pury.

Behnam-Bakhtiar's more recent and most recognized works are paintings created in his signature style of peinture raclée. This involves intricate scraping, relaying and spreading of blends over particular points. For the artist, these represent layers of energy, emotion and time. He paints for several months to years to create complex works referencing a prosperous way of life, human evolution, the universal language, eternal feelings and Self, history, present and future, awakening a strong sense of positive emotions and transcendence, while accessing its audience's psyche to bring about locked knowledge, intuition, and human sensitivity.

Behnam-Bakhtiar's paintings have been exhibited since 2017 alongside works by Gerhard Richter, Georg Baselitz, and Sigmar Polke amongst others, including a solo exhibition at London's Saatchi Gallery and a solo exhibition at the historic Villa Santo Sospir in Saint-Jean-Cap-Ferrat entitled Oneness Wholeness with Jean Cocteau.

In 2016, the Behnam-Bakhtiar family founded the Fondation Behnam-Bakhtiar in Saint-Jean-Cap-Ferrat, a collection of contemporary works by artists of Iranian descent. It houses pieces by artists including Parviz Tanavoli, Shirin Neshat, Farideh Lashai, Sohrab Sepehri, and Ardeshir Mohassess, as well as lesser-known ones. The non-political and non-religious Fondation is intended as a cultural gateway between Iran and the West.

== Philanthropy ==
Through the Behnam-Bakhtiar Award, the Fondation works to support emerging artists of Iranian descent through financial support, as well as in the hosting of exhibitions and in printing of artists' books. The award was first held in 2017 in the theme ‘Future. Iran.’ with works on the development of a better future for Iran. Iran-based artist Babak Kazemi won first prize. Behnam-Bakhtiar is also a patron of the Serpentine Galleries and has been patron of the Magic of Persia charity in London, assisting at its fundraising galas.

== Reception ==
Behnam-Bakhtiar's art has gained recognition from several publications, notably The Guardian, Tatler, Vanity FairHarper's Bazaar Art GQ. and Huffington Post.

== Selected exhibitions and auctions ==
- Journey Within, Sotheby's (September 2022)
- Present The Future, Four Seasons (June 2021)
- Garden of the Soul, Villa Brasilia (June 2021)
- Rebirth, Saint-Jean-Cap-Ferrat Cultural Center (October 2021)
- In The Name of Life, Setareh Gallery (January 2021)
- Extremis, Setareh Gallery (October, November 2019)
- Middle Eastern Modern and Contemporary Art, Christie's, London (October 2019)
- Oneness Wholeness With Jean Cocteau, Santo Sospir (Sep 2018)
- Oneness Wholeness, Saatchi Gallery (May 2018)
- Setareh Gallery, Abu Dhabi Art (November 2017)
- Memory & Future/Future & Memory, Shirin Gallery, New York City (October 2016)
- Blue Gold, Etemad Gallery, Tehran (April 2016)
- Modern and Contemporary Middle Eastern Art, Bonham's, London (November 2017)
- Contemporary Middle Eastern Art, artnet Auctions (Online; February 2017)
- Middle Eastern Contemporary Art, Christie's, Dubai (March 2018)
