= RWD Magazine =

British magazine

- Editor: Tego Sigel
- Senior Staff Writer: Ben Fawcett
- Online Editor: Tego Sigel
- Former editors: Nardene Scott | Matt Mason | Vector Meldrew | Hattie Collins
- Staff writers: Grant Brydon, Ben Fawcett, Julius Pepperwood
- Categories: Music, style, sport, gaming, film, technology, news
- Frequency: Monthly
- Total circulation: 98,806 (ABC Jul – Dec 2013); Print and digital editions.
- Founded: 1 September 2001
- Company: Rewind Creative Media LTD
- Country: United Kingdom
- Language: English

RWD Magazine (also known as RWD or RWDmag) was a British-based magazine which featured music, style, sport, gaming, film, technology, news, interviews, and charts on hip hop, grime, dubstep, R&B, UK garage, drum and bass, and U.S. house music. Running from 2001–2014, it was released monthly, distributing 98,300 copies each time and was ABC certified. It was considered the largest magazine on youth music and lifestyle in the United Kingdom.

The magazine, RWDmag, also had a website, which featured music videos, tracks, and artist profiles. RWDmag.com was the first major website to champion grime music.

== History ==
RWD Magazine was established in 2001, having received a £2,000 grant from the Prince's Trust. It became a well-known name in UK underground urban music circles in mid- to late 2003. This coincided with the rise of a new urban music genre, which later became popularly referred to as grime.

RWD Magazine provided a platform for emerging and unsigned artists. Aspiring artists would pay to feature in the magazine. As the magazine was free, it gained a broader distribution than a paid magazine might.

This new platform (along with music channel Channel U) appealed to many aspiring artists from the grime scene, and allowed them to do independently what they could have previously only done with the backing of a major record label.

Part of the success of the magazine was driven by its official website, which was buoyed by its popular forum, named RWD forum, both launched by Vector Meldrew,the most central point being the "Grime Music" forum. This forum allowed for the discussion of everything to do with the grime music scene and regularly enjoyed visits from big names who occasionally also posted.

=== 2000–2004 ===
During 2002-04, the magazine focused on the intersection between UK garage and the birth of grime music. The website was built, launched, and promoted by teenaged online director Alex Donne Johnson (later known professionally as Vector Meldrew), who later went on to form his own creative agency, Dazzle Ship." During this period, the website won a number of awards, including London Business of the Year, UK Garage Awards: Best Website 2002, and Sidewinder Peoples Choice Awards: Best Magazine 2013.

As part of the marketing campaign for the website, The Booo Krooo were born. They were soon co-signed by Missy Elliott asking to be featured in the cartoon for her hit single "Work It". The Booo Krooo went on to secure a 6 episode broadcast series on British TV channel Channel U and produced a music video with UK garage producer Sticky, famous for hits such as the track (also named) "Booo!".

=== 2007–2008 ===
In mid-2007, RWD Magazine underwent a number of management changes, one of the most important being a change of editor. The new management wanted to expand the magazine's audience to feature all types of music that might appeal to a younger generation. To achieve this, the content and appearance of the magazine and website changed, much to the disappointment of the users. This resulted in an exodus of users, establishing their own forum, namely ViP2 Forum, which evolved from the Flashback993 fora that were established in 2005. Grime Forum was also created where grime music fans who used to post in the RWDmag forum created their own forum website named Grime Forum with its own connected "Grimepedia" encyclopedia of the genre, as well as a music store. During this time, both SBTV and GRM Daily managed to adapt to the new video-based YouTube generation, and took the top spot as the source for grime content on the internet.

=== 2009 ===
On 1 April 2009, RWD launched a new and redesigned website with extended content under the different genres and enhanced social networking features, which give users the ability to manage their own profiles, keep in touch with friends, and track forum activity.

=== 2014 ===
RWD Magazine launched a football show known as FilthyFellas on YouTube on 12 September ahead of the 2014–15 Premier League season. The show released a new episode every Monday at 7:00 pm following the matches of the weekend, and is known for its amusing and mocking element of "banter" that it contains.
