= Pulse X =

Single by Youngstar
- Released: 8 July 2002 (UK)
- Genre: Grime
- Label: Inspired Sounds
- Songwriter: Daryl Nurse

"Pulse X" is a grime instrumental by producer Youngstar of the crew Musical Mob. First released on 12" vinyl in March 2002 and given a wider release in July of the same year, Pulse X is widely considered to be the first ever grime beat and has been described as "year zero" for the genre. Its drum pattern was sequenced in Propellerhead ReBirth, then mixed with other elements in Digital Orchestrator. It was re-released by White Peach Records on 16 November 2015 in the form of an extended play.

== Style and influence ==
Pulse X is noted for its aggressive minimalism and original sound, consisting of a single 16 bar loop, with some minor variation to the patterns in the second half of the song, with a more typical 2-step garage style for 8 bars followed by a stripped down snare and kick for 8 bars. The song has no introduction and the outro is a simple fade out. A voice sample saying "Musical Mob royal pon the map" plays once every 32 bars throughout on the switch from one 8-bar pattern to the other.

Pulse X was very influential on early grime productions and the wider post garage landscape of the electronic music scene in London in the early 2000s, with the instrumental continuing to influence grime's new wave of producers in the early 2010s Bok Bok called Youngstar's early music as "simplistic, brutalist genius" in 2014 describing "Pulse X" his favourite example of the producers work. The minimalism and empty space on beats such as Pulse X set the foundations for the development of grime as a more MC centric genre than its forebear UK garage with MCs preferring to spit over the new style of beat in raves and on pirate radio.

== Remixes and alternative versions ==
The song has spawned many remixes, five of which were released through Liminal Sounds on 25 January 2013. Mystry's instrumental "Pulse 8" is inspired by the track, and was used as the opening beat on Jme's 2015 album Integrity>.

== Track listing ==
2013 remix EP
No.	Title	Length
1.	"Pulse X" (Visionist Remix)	4:43
2.	"Pulse X" (Blackwax Remix)	4:21
3.	"Pulse X" (Slackk Remix)	5:58
4.	"Pulse X" (Pedro 123 Remix)	4:13
5.	"Pulse X" (Elsewhere Remix)	3:48

2015 re-release
No.	Title	Length
1.	"Pulse X"	5:16
2.	"Revival"	3:38
3.	"Formula"	5:18
4.	"Formula 2"	4:47
