= Addison Groove =

English electronic music artist

- Born: Tony Williams; 28 November 1982 (age 43); Bristol, England, UK
- Genre: Dubstep Juke Techno
- Occupations: Record Producer, DJ
- Labels: Tempa, Tectonic, 50 Weapons, Gutterfunk

Tony Williams, better known as Addison Groove (and formerly known as Headhunter), is a Bristolian electronic music artist. Noted for his fusion of styles such as Techno, Jungle, Soul, Juke and Dubstep, he released his first album Nomad on Tempa (the same label that Skream and Benga started on) in 2008.

One of Addison Groove's most well-known tracks, "Foot Crab", was later released on Dubstep legend Loefah's label 'Swamp 81' and features cut up samples influenced by the Chicago 'Juke' sound. He has also released on Tectonic (owned by fellow Bristolian dubstep head honcho Pinch), 50 Weapons (of Modeselektor fame) and 3024.

The Quietus cited Addison Groove as being "instrumental in drawing Chicago juke and footwork within reach of UK dancefloors". This progression away from dubstep allowed him to gain interest from mainstream media platforms such as BBC Radio 1, Dazed and Vice Magazine and The Red Bull Music Academy.

Addison Groove has collaborated with Vector Meldrew on a range of audio-visual projects, including a live show and music videos.

In 2012 Addison Groove developed a live 808 show which toured nightclubs such as, Boiler Room, Fabric, London and Berlin's infamous Berghain.

More recently he has moved away from dubstep towards the UK Bass scene working with artists such as DJ Die and his label Gutterfunk.
