= Matt Mason (author) =

English author and businessman (born 1978)

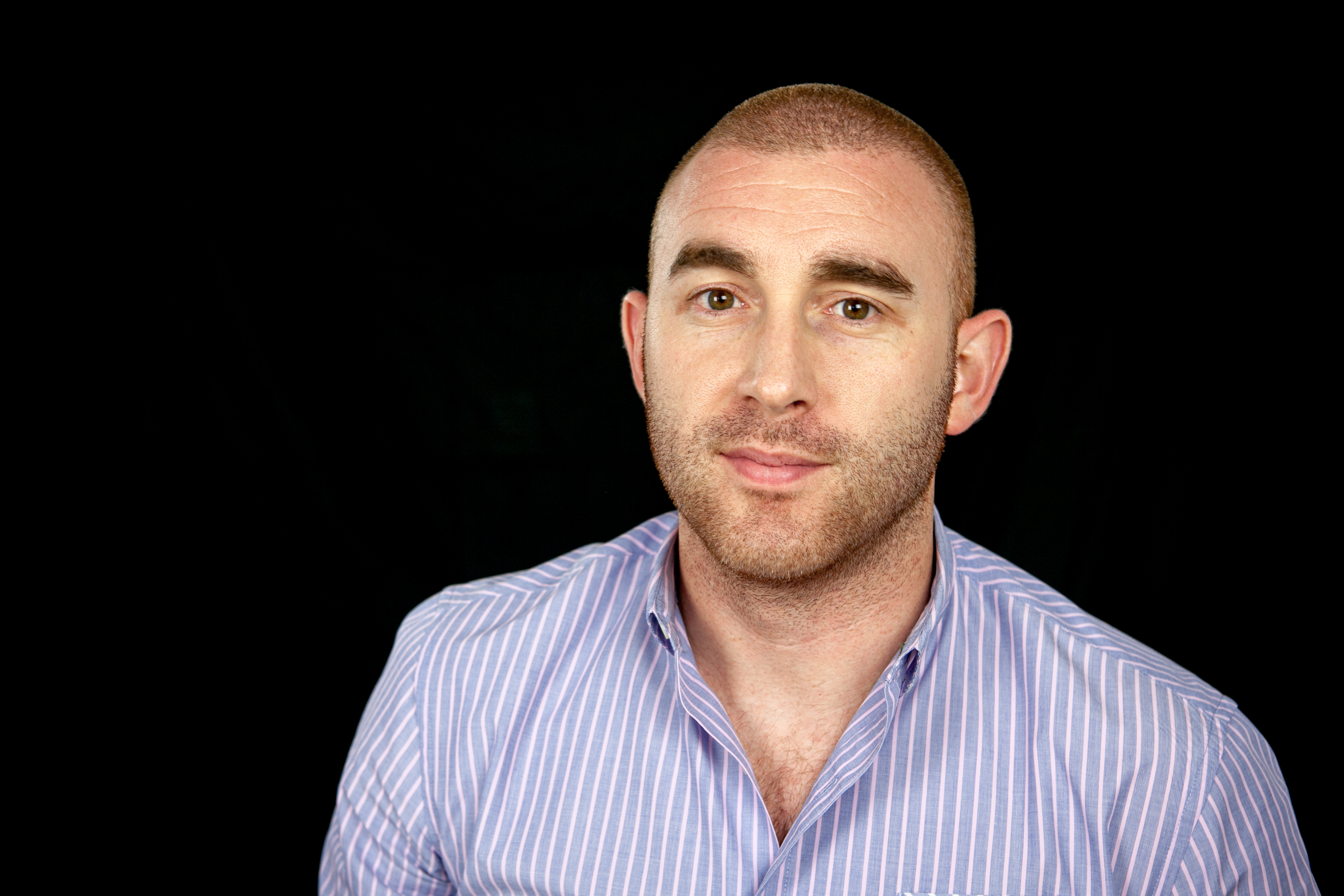
- Mason in 2013
- Born: 11 August 1978 (age 48); London, United Kingdom
- Citizenship: United States
- Education: University of Bristol
- Occupations: Author, businessman
- Known for: 1-800-N0TH1NG; The Pirate's Dilemma; RWD Magazine; BitTorrent Bundle
- Spouse: Kelli Newman Mason
- Website: mattjmason.com

Matt Mason (born 11 August 1978) is an English author and creative executive. He is the former chief content officer for BitTorrent Inc. and studio head at 1-800-N0TH1NG, an innovation lab financed by Sony Pictures Entertainment. He is the author of The Pirate's Dilemma and the founding editor-in-chief of RWD Magazine. He has written for VICE, The Observer, Complex, and other publications in more than twenty countries.

== Career ==
=== Early career ===
Mason grew up in London and began DJing as a teen on the pirate radio stations Ice FM and Mac FM. He attended the University of Bristol, where he graduated with a degree in economics. After his studies, he worked in music and advertising at companies including Warner Music, Saatchi & Saatchi, and Mediacom.

=== RWD ===
In 2001, Mason became the founding editor-in-chief of RWD Magazine. RWD was created to push new sounds emerging from the UK, most notably UK garage, grime, and dubstep, and Mason became the first journalist to interview a number of prominent UK artists, including Dizzee Rascal, Skepta, and Tinchy Stryder.

RWD became the largest music magazine by circulation in the UK, growing from 5,000 copies per month to almost 100,000. Based on his work at RWD, Mason was selected as one of the faces of former British prime minister Gordon Brown's Start Talking Ideas campaign and was presented the Prince's Trust London Business of the Year Award by Prince Charles in 2004.

Between 2001 and 2004, Mason also ran the independent label Tuned Plastic, specialising in UK garage, grime, and dubstep. Submarine, a record produced by Mason and released on Tuned Plastic, was included on DJ EZ's seminal Pure Garage: Bass Breaks and Beats compilation in 2001.

Between 2003 and 2005, Mason also anonymously wrote the Grimewatch column for Vice magazine, only outing himself as its author in his last column, before leaving RWD and moving to New York.

=== The Booo Krooo ===
Between 2002 and 2004, Mason connected RWD's online director Lex Johnson and illustrator Art Jaz to create the animated adult sitcom series The Booo Krooo. After the first three-episode web series, the concept was co-signed by Missy Elliott, who asked to be featured to promote her single "Work It". From here, Channel U commissioned a six-episode series to launch their European music TV channel. This was later cited by Ransom Note as the first in the "grime comedy" genre.

=== The Pirate's Dilemma ===
In 2005, Mason moved to New York and began working on his first book, The Pirate's Dilemma, watch was published by Simon & Schuster in the US and Penguin in the UK in early 2008.

The book was met with critical acclaim and became the first book to hit the number one spot on both Amazon's hip hop and economics bestseller lists at the same time. Wired gave it 9 out of 10 and BusinessWeek named Mason 'Pirate of the Year'.

In the book, Mason makes the case that the best way to beat piracy is to compete with it, by determining the value pirates are creating and coming up with legal alternatives. "By short-circuiting conventional channels and red tape, pirates can deliver new materials, formats, and business models to audiences who want them", he writes. "Canal Street moves faster than Wall Street. Piracy transforms the markets it operates in, changing the way distribution works and forcing companies to be more competitive and innovative. Pirates don't just defend the public domain from corporate control; they also force big business and government to deliver what we want, when we want it".

The paperback was released in 2009, and The Pirate's Dilemma has since been published in ten countries.

As a journalist, Mason's work began to appear outside of RWD and Vice. By 2009, he had been published in The Guardian, The Independent, The Observer Music Monthly, Dazed & Confused, Adweek, Complex, Libération, and other publications in more than twenty countries.

=== BitTorrent ===
Mason spent the next few years speaking on his work and consulting, as well as working as director of innovation and strategy for New York-based creative agency Syrup LLC. In 2011, he joined BitTorrent as head of marketing, taking on "a full-time job reshaping BitTorrent's tattered image", as Fast Company would later describe it.

When Mason started at BitTorrent, there was a plan on the table to rename the company. But according to Fast Company, "(Mason) ran an experiment that gave everyone there pause. BitTorrent released a file-sharing product called SoShare and advertised it in two ways—as simply SoShare and as SoShare by BitTorrent. The ads with "BitTorrent" in them attracted five times more clicks. 'If you just put the word BitTorrent in front of something people already do on the web', Mason said, 'people understand it means something different'. Changing the name was out".

Mason saw another opportunity at BitTorrent based on his previous work on piracy. The company had begun promoting specific artists' content in its download clients, and he wanted to expand upon that. Mason transformed the experimental promotion of artists into a full-fledged product he called BitTorrent Bundles, which made it easy for artists to put packages of content into the BitTorrent ecosystem. BitTorrent then promoted this to its 170 million users.

The company officially launched BitTorrent Bundle with the artist Kaskade in May 2013. The early results were encouraging. As Fast Company described it, "Best-selling self-help author Tim Ferriss—desperate after being boycotted by bookstores for using Amazon as a publisher—released the first chapter of his book The 4-Hour Chef in a bundle, with recipes, an audiobook, and live workshop video content available in exchange for a user's email address. About 210,000 people downloaded the bundle in the first week, and 85,000 of them followed a link to where Amazon sold the full book. Linkin Park used bundles to distribute a free trial of its recording software, StageLight, and soon after saw a 200% increase in the number of upgrades to the paid version. Madonna released a 17-minute film, which was downloaded 2.7 million times".

Under Mason’s leadership in marketing, BitTorrent reintroduced itself as a credible technology company with a 2013 billboard campaign that garnered a great deal of attention. The company anonymously posted billboards in San Francisco, New York, and Los Angeles depicting controversial statements such as "Your Data Should Belong to the NSA" and "The Internet Should Be Regulated". After several weeks of media confusion, including an investigation by the LA Times, Mason revealed in a blog post that BitTorrent was behind the ads. That same day, the statements were altered, displaying more positive messages such as "Your Data Should Belong to You" and "The Internet Should Be People Powered". "With the reveal, we are showing people that things don't actually have to be like that", Mason told Mashable in an interview, referring to the original bleak messages. "If you look at BitTorrent's technology and protocols, things can be a different way".

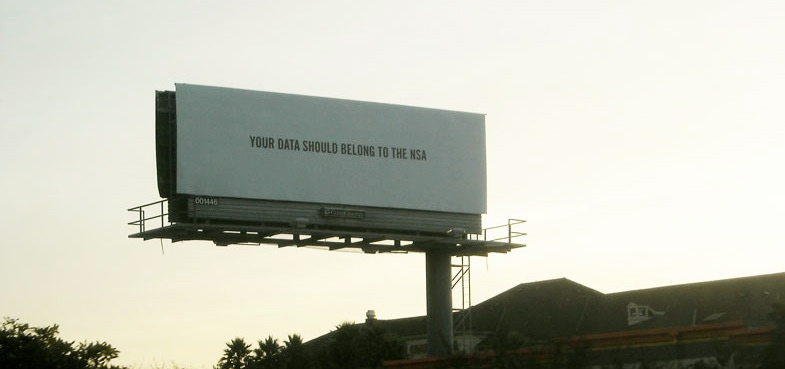
A BitTorrent billboard in San Francisco, 2013

In May 2014, Mason was promoted to Chief Content Officer. On 26 September 2014, BitTorrent released their first pay-gated Bundle, Tomorrow's Modern Boxes, an album by Radiohead singer Thom Yorke. Mason revealed that he had been working on the project with Yorke and Radiohead producer Nigel Godrich in secret for over a year. By February 2015, the album had been downloaded more than 4.5 million times.

Today, there are more than 30,000 artists using Bundle and during 2014, more than 250 million fans legally downloaded a piece of content via the platform.

=== 1-800-N0TH1NG ===
In September 2015, Mason started 1-800-N0TH1NG. Their first product, Bbble (pronounced 'bubble'), launched in September 2016 for iOS. Bbble is a social video trivia platform where one can play solo, challenge friends, or star as the host by snapping video questions.

1-800-N0TH1NG also quietly piloted a new type of gaming experience in July 2016: RoboKong—a live, live-action game that streamed for four hours on Twitch, where viewers got to control real people on the set of the game.

In RoboKong, players take control of a real person on a live set, controlling the actions of the player in the live broadcast by video chat, directing RoboKong as he attempts to escape from a lab teeming with rogue mutants. With little marketing, the live show attracted 684,563 views over four hours, generating four million brand impressions and more than 26,000 fan messages.

=== Other projects ===
In 2015, Mason was voted the eleventh most creative person in business by Fast Company. He left BitTorrent in June of that year and began working on his second book, a sci-fi novel about piracy in the near future, entitled Broadside.

In 2013, Mason collaborated with Zegna brand designer Stefano Pilati on the Tumblr-based gN project to launch the designer's first collection.

In 2010, Mason made London Pirate Frequencies, a documentary with Vice on the past, present, and future of pirate radio in London.

In 2009, Mason collaborated with Nicholas Felton on Hard Times, an 'info-graphic novel' for Penguin that won Best in Show that year at SXSW.
