= The Booo Krooo =

British animated series

- The Tuffest Youts on Road
- Genre: Grime Comedy | Comedy | Adult Animation
- Created by: Matt Mason | Vector Meldrew | Julian Johnson |
- Written by: Matt Mason
- Directed by: Vector Meldrew
- Voices of: Matt Mason, Fabio Scianna
- Theme music composer: Bodysnatchers
- Opening theme: Sticky a.k.a. Richard Forbes
- Original language: English
- No. of seasons: 2
- No. of episodes: 9

Production
- Animator: Lex Johnson
- Production company: DAZZLE SHIP

Original release
- Network: Channel U
- Release: 2002 – 2004

The Booo Krooo (occasionally also spelled Boo Kroo) started life as a comic strip and then turned into a web-series and then a UK adult animated sitcom created by Matt Mason, Vector Meldrew and Julian (Art Jaz) Johnson for the now defunct British TV network Channel U (now called Now 70s). The series follows the mis-adventures of three up-and-coming grime/rap MCs who are constantly trying to find ways to get famous, get girls or save the world.

In 2026, the work was acquired by the BFI National Archive as part of a collection documenting the emergence of online video as a distinct screen form, alongside genres such as ASMR, Twitch streaming, and web comedy.

== History ==
The TV series originated from a web-series created whilst the production team were running the RWD magazine website and forum. Taking hints from underground music culture and the intersection between UK garage and grime, the 3 episode web series was shortly co-signed by Missy Elliott after her PR team asked to feature the artist as part of the campaign for her hit single "Work It". The series then acquired a 6-episode deal on Channel U and recorded a music video with UK garage producer Sticky, known for hits such as "Booo!" featuring Ms. Dynamite.

In 2004, the Prince's Trust featured the Booo Krooo as part of the marketing campaign for their first Urban Music Festival featuring the likes of Jay-Z, Beyoncé and Dizzee Rascal.

Also in 2004, the Booo Krooo gained interest from Christian Fussenegger and Arte TV, a German music and youth magazine program who asked to feature the Booo Krooo in a 10-minute slot. The director claimed: "French-German TV Arte is viewed as one of the best channels in the world. We would like to include the Booo Krooo in a piece about the garage-offshoots, show their videos or even do a little 'interview' with them, why? Because they tackle topics that are not purely music related and consumer-orientated, which makes them really interesting."

In 2005, the series came to a halt after the production team decided to pursue other commitments.

In 2011 Vector Meldrew opened up about the collaboration in an article with Maxon entitled 'Vector Meldrew - Big In Japan'. The article states:

Vector Meldrew, was running a music magazine's website at the time of setting sail in professional animation. Alex explains: "On April Fools' Day we decided to run a joke article about a group of musicians with a ridiculous past. We dressed and posed for a photo shoot and wrote the article saying things like we were 'big in Japan'." Oddly enough, everyone seemed to fall for the joke. Even the biggest talent scouts in the music industry were taken in, getting in touch to find out more about the insane band who were big in Japan. "We thought it was so funny we turned the concept into an animation and used it to promote the website," continues Alex. "It was my first attempt at animating and it was terrible, but it was successful enough to drive a great deal of traffic to the website. Even the script writer, Matt Mason, went on to become an author and included the amusing anecdote in his book.":

In 2017, music publication TheRansomNote cited the Booo Krooo as the first in the grime comedy genre.

"Boo Kroo are pretty much forgotten now - they started life as a comic strip that appeared regularly in RWD Magazine. Three useless MCs trying to ride the garage wave, Boo Kroo were essentially a proto version of People Just Do Nothing. After proving a popular feature in the magazine, they levelled up to real world status by recording a track produced by a peak form Sticky." . This Resident Advisor review from 2003 sees the point of the track whooshing over the reviewers head “what's with those weird ass vocals,” he complains, bewildered “sounds like it's the work of one impressionist pulling off about 4 different personalities.”

The article states:

"The Sticky produced beat bangs. Released in 2003 – around the time Dizzee was pushing out his Ho! And Go! white labels, Boo Kroo Theme is unusually prescient in where the sound is going, with bratty MCs barring over a track that's little more than mean bass hits and cheap synth brass. A few years later Boo Kroo were given their own show on Channel U – which is how this video for the track came about. Episodes of which can be watched on this long defunct Boo Kroo website – after that, who knows? Any info on the creator would be appreciated… Classic or not, Boo Kroo Theme set the tone for the grime comedy that followed; stupid threats from over gassed road men.

== Channel U ==
In 2003, the Booo Krooo were commissioned for their first TV series for the launch of Channel U, a European music channel that focused on underground music.

In 2016, Darren Platt, founder of Channel U died. Cited by an obituary in The Guardian, "It forged a place for a genre that began its life ignored by the mainstream." Artists such as Stormzy paid tribute.

In 2018, Channel U closed it doors and has since been remembered for introducing the music careers of artists such as Dizzee Rascal, Kano, Wiley and Lethal Bizzle.

== Premise and main characters ==
The show revolved around three up-and-coming MCs: Bucky, Flexster and Giro, pioneers of pirate radio station 'Dunce FM'. The crew often ended up in situations where they were worse off than when they started.

Bucky is the head of the gang, the mastermind of the operation and the front MC. Giro is an MC/DJ and a ladies' man. Flexster is described as less intelligent than his two friends, and an average MC at best. They are found together outside chicken shops, or "on road" causing trouble.

== Discography ==
"The Booo Krooo Theme", produced by Sticky, was released on Social Circles (JKSC040).

== Episodes ==
=== Webisodes (2002) ===
| No. overall | Title | Original release date |
|---|---|---|
| 0.1 | "Flossin' on a Budget" | 2002 |
The crew want to hit the club and floss hard, they've got their haircut, their shanks and their Avirex but Giro's mum has accidentally dyed his trousers pink.
| 0.2 | "Attack of the Clones" | 2002 |
The crew want to get matching leather jackets to look unique, the problem is that everyone else wants to do the same. Not only that but they realise what happens when you wear the same clothes for too many days in a row
| 0.3 | "Work It featuring Missy Elliott" | 2002 |
The crew look towards Missy Elliott for inspiration, however they take it too far when they steal her whole flow and use it on their pirate radio station, Missy is in the area and pays the studio a visit with her bouncers.

=== Series 1 (2003) ===
| No. overall | No. in season | Title | Original release date |
|---|---|---|---|
| 1 | 1 | "Papstars" | 2003 |
The crew want to get on TV so decide to enter 'Papsters' with judges Simon Coward and Britney Smears. The judges have other ideas and try to water down their act for commercial success.
| 2 | 2 | "Get Weighty" | 2003 |
The crew meet Giro's sister on road and realise they need to get 'hench' if they stand a chance with the ladies. So they hit the gym, get some new garms and some ice. Turns out their new look has the opposite effect,
| 3 | 3 | "Iraqi Malarky" | 2003 |
UK Parliament decide that the crew are to blame for gun crime and social disorder, so they pack them off to Iraq to fight in the war. The crew quickly go about setting up a pirate radio station and accidentally solve world peace.
| 4 | 4 | "Pop Tee" | 2003 |
The crew start to attract sponsorship deals from brands, however their rock and roll image isn't quite what they were signed up for. Incidents involving drunken antics, fighting, strip clubs and Dean Gaffney land them in a whole heap of trouble.
| 5 | 5 | "Big Brudda" | 2003 |
The boys decided to take on the Big Brudda house, however after some accidental animal cruelty and peeping Tom antics Flexster and Giro are quickly ejected. Bucky is left to make new friends. However he accidentally makes too many, in the form of crabs!
| 6 | 6 | "Reloaded" | 2003 |
The crew realise that reality is an illustion and the music industry is being controlled by Chris Evans feeding our minds with watered down pop nonsense. They go into the Matrix and to fight lyrically and restore quality to the music industry.

== Legacy ==
In 2020 Yomi Agedoke wrote in The Guardian : "The Booo Krooo comic strip from youth lifestyle magazine RWD was reimagined as an adult animated sitcom for the network. It also documented the misadventures of three cringy wannabe MCs, relatable to the majority of boys with a voice box and a mobile phone during that period. Everyone in “ends” wanted to be a grime artist and part of Channel U’s magic lay in the fact anyone could be, for a bit. It thrived with its mishmash of actual musicians and part-time MCs whose aspirations appeared to begin and end with their video airing on the channel. In 2015, I tracked down a handful of the channel’s lesser-known legends, famous in their own right, for a documentary called The Lost Stars of Channel U’. It was greeted with hysteria, with fans demanding a further spin-off series, updating them on those we hadn’t covered."

== British Film Institute ==
In 2026 the BFI began to acquire the work for their permanent archive

The collection website claims: " From viral memes to video essays ... taking the forms of comedy, drama, documentary and animation. It’s become embedded into every aspect of UK (and world) society. This unique collection of online videos combines iconic highlights of British online video with other examples chosen to illustrate that sheer diversity."

The work now sites alongside the likes of : Badgers, Junior Spesh, Mandem on the Wall and Charlie Bit my Finger.
