= Hyper Island =

Swedish educational company

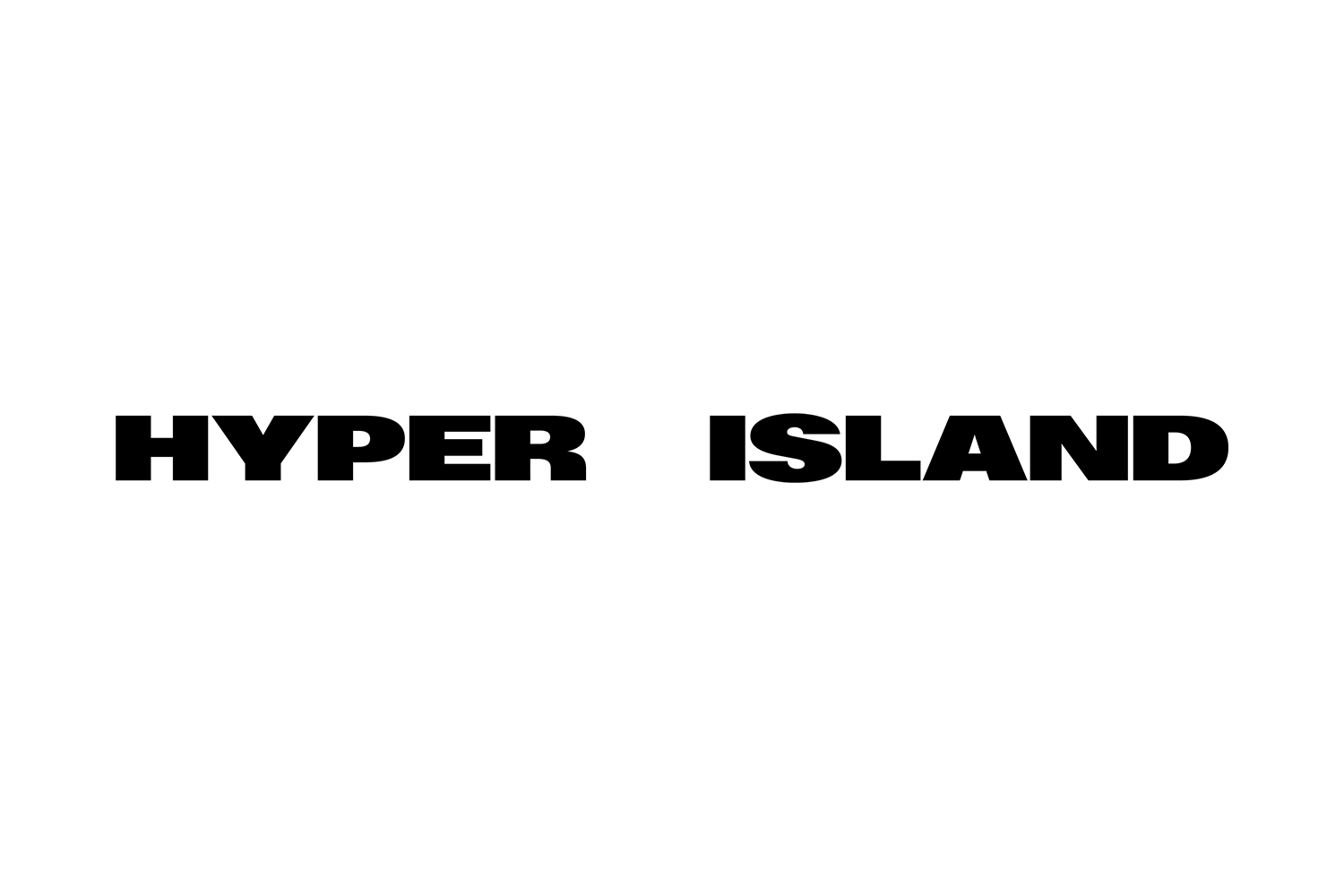
- Industry: Education
- Founded: 1996
- Number of locations: Stockholm Karlskrona; Singapore; São Paulo; London Manchester
- Website: hyperisland.com

Hyper Island is a digital creative business school with a consultancy side specializing in industry training using digital technology. It was founded 1996 in Karlskrona, Sweden and has locations in Sweden (headquarters), Brazil, UK, US, and Singapore.

Hyper Island offers full-time and part-time education programs as well as intensive courses aimed at industry executives. The different Hyper Island MA programs are accredited through Teesside University.

== Recognition and awards ==
Hyper Island was once referred to as "The Digital Harvard" by PSFK and has been listed by CNN as one of the "most interesting schools around the world".
