= Grime music =

Genre of electronic dance music

Grime
- Wiley + Roll Deep Crew (2001)
- Stylistic origins: UK garage; jungle; 2-step; hip-hop; dancehall; drum and bass; ragga; chiptune; video game music
- Cultural origins: Early 2000s, London
- Typical instruments: Vocals; Music sequencer; Digital audio workstation; Turntables

Subgenres
- Grimey Garage, Eski, Eski-beat, 8 Bar, Sublow

Fusion genres
- Grindie

Grime is a genre of electronic dance music (EDM) that emerged in London in the early 2000s. It developed out of the earlier UK dance style UK garage, and draws influences from jungle, dancehall, and hip-hop. The style is typified by rapid, syncopated breakbeats, generally around 140 beats per minute, and often features an aggressive or jagged electronic sound. Emceeing is a significant element of the style, and lyrics often revolve around gritty depictions of urban life.

The style initially spread among pirate radio stations and underground scenes before achieving some mainstream recognition in the UK during the mid-2000s through artists such as Dizzee Rascal, Kano, Lethal Bizzle, and Wiley. Grime's rise in the early 2000s benefited from a time before smartphones and social media dominated the music landscape, allowing the genre to develop at a slower, organic pace. Many of grime's foundational MCs, such as Ghetts, Kano, and Skepta, spent years refining their craft, with early career periods often lasting five to ten years. This period also produced significant archival material, from Run the Road compilations and Lord of the Mics DVDs to the RWD magazine and forum, all of which captured grime's evolution at its peak. The genre’s emergence has often been compared to punk rock, a comparison solidified by tracks like Jammer's "Dagenham Dave," a nod to The Stranglers' song of the same name.

The accessibility of music production technology, DIY media, and pirate radio stations contributed to grime’s grassroots nature. The genre was fueled by a "create it if it doesn't exist" mentality, similar to other independent music scenes. In its early days, grime was less a challenge to the music industry and more a direct parallel, with its own ecosystem of photographers, marketers, promoters, journalists, and label owners acting as both creators and gatekeepers. The genre has been described as the "most significant musical development within the UK for decades."

Though they are often compared, grime is generally considered distinct from hip hop due to its roots primarily being genres such as UK garage and jungle.

== History ==
=== Origins ===
Grime emerged in the early 2000s in East London. It has origins tied with UK pirate radio stations such as Rinse FM, Deja Vu, Major FM, Delight FM, Freeze 92.7 and Mission. and it was through pirate radio that artists could first present themselves and build an audience. In the late 1990s, UK garage grew in popularity and also found crossover commercial success with shows on Kiss 100 and BBC Radio 1. Whilst much of the popular UK garage sound fused soul and R&B influences, a 'darker garage' sound was also appearing which was more instrumental and less vocal, which allowed MCs to lay down lyrics over them. The role of MCs became more prominent on radio shows, and collectives such as So Solid Crew (on Delight FM), Heartless Crew (on Mission), and Pay As U Go (on Rinse FM) would begin to pave the way for what would eventually be called "grime". Members of these crews would begin to experiment with accessible music creation software such as Fruityloops to write their own instrumentals which were cut to dubplate for shows.

The first definitive grime release is often debated. Some will credit Pay As U Go's "Know We" or So Solid Crew's "Dilemma" (both were released in 2000), however, "Eskimo" by Wiley (produced in Christmas 1999 or early 2000, but released in 2002) and "Pulse X" by Youngstar (released in 2002), a member of Musical Mobb, are also often considered to be contenders. Dizzee Rascal personally claimed his song "Crime", released in 2000, was the first grime song. DJ Slimzee and DJ Karnage have also suggested "Year 2000" (released 2000) by Wiley as a contender. Other tracks that were among the first to be labelled as "grime" include "Ice Rink" and "Igloo" by Wiley, "Creeper" by Danny Weed, and "Dollar Sign" by Sticky featuring Stush.

Several earlier electronic music tracks have been noted for sharing elements of what would later become grime music. "Bamboo Houses" (1982) by Ryuichi Sakamoto and David Sylvian "accidentally predicted" grime and was "the earliest example of proto-grime" according to Fact, with a "gleaming synth lead, syncopated drumming and the type of vaguely Asian motif that would go on to define much of Wiley and Jammer's early work" in Sinogrime. It later appeared on Kode9’s DJ sets and was remixed by Slackk, becoming "a grime touchstone" by the early 2010s. Also of note is the 1994 Super Nintendo video game soundtrack Wolverine: Adamantium Rage, composed by Shahid Ahmad and Dylan Beale. According to Fact, it features "all the hallmarks of early grime instrumentals: staccato strings, eski bleeps and square wave bass". It predates the first recognized grime instrumentals by eight years.

Wiley at the timed dubbed the sound 'eskibeat' rather than "grime", which had yet to gain popular usage. His song "Eskimo" was characterised by its sparse and cold production, and "awkward, off-kilter rhythms". Wiley explained this colder, darker sound, reflected his mental state at the time, stating "The music reflects what's going on in society. Everyone's so angry at the world and each other. And they don't know why" to Spin magazine in 2005. The name "grime" was coined by journalists who initially termed the music's sub-bass heavy sound as "grimy", which subsequently became "grime". It has also been suggested by artists themselves that the term fits as the music frequently talks about "grimy goings-on" in deprived areas. Initially, some referred to the genre as 'grimey garage'.

At this point, the style was known by a number of names, including 8-bar (meaning eight-bar verse patterns), nu shape (which encouraged more complex 16-bar and 32-bar verse patterns), sublow (a music style and movement created by Jon E Cash with Dread D (T Williams) and crew "The Black Ops", the name sublow being a reference to the very low bassline frequencies, often around 40 Hz) and eskibeat, a term applied specifically to a style initially developed by Wiley and his collaborators, incorporating dance and electro elements. This indicated the movement of UK garage away from its house influences towards darker themes and sounds. Wiley's song "Wot Do U Call It" was released in 2004 and was made to address the identity problems grime was experiencing at the time, and to establish its separation from garage. It became Wiley's first grime hit song.

Grime is not an offshoot of early electronic music, but rather a subgenre that draws from a wide variety of influences. Early innovative artists such as Dizzee Rascal and Wiley were able to take the strong thumping drums of drum and bass, lyricism and vocal styles of UK garage and alter some of the rhythms of dancehall to capture all three genre's essences and add a new half-time, down-tempo dimension to the mix. The genre's popularity grew exponentially in the United Kingdom, as people across the scene's musical spectrum appreciated grime's eclectic mix of instrumentation and subcultures. This hybridisation united many different music scenes, allowing for it to spread in the same word-of-mouth and mixtape-based style as hip-hop, yet still appeal to fans of electronic music. It also paved the way for more electronic music artists to incorporate stronger Jamaican influence in the future. Grime never received the same attention worldwide that it did in the UK. Much like many other less mainstream forms of British electronic music, its main scene and fan base remain in the United Kingdom.

Although grime is recognised as a creative and innovative musical style, there are other contributing factors to its rapid and widespread growth in popularity. The MCs producing current grime music are overwhelmingly young as a group, the most well known names in the industry, Dizzee Rascal and Kano, both getting their first hits at the age of 16 with "I Luv U" and "Boys Love Girls" respectively, and the resultant package of "youth making music for youth" is seen as a crucial factor for grime's success.

Grime producers often battle in so-called "war dubs". Clashing between MC's is generally considered to be an important part of grime culture.

=== Development ===
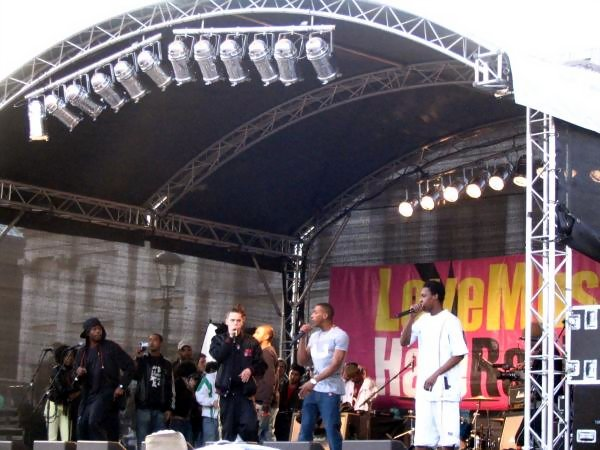
Roll Deep, a well-known grime crew, performs at the 2006 Love Music Hate Racism festival.

Dizzee Rascal, Wiley, Kano and Lethal Bizzle were among the first to bring the genre to mainstream media attention in 2003–2004, with their albums Boy in da Corner, Treddin' on Thin Ice, Home Sweet Home and Against All Oddz respectively. Dizzee Rascal garnered widespread critical acclaim and commercial success with Boy in da Corner winning the 2003 Mercury Music Prize. From 2001 to 2006 The RWD mag.com forum was cited as a key development in the genre's culture. Moderators included Logan Sama, and artists such as Wiley, Skepta and Jme would often come on the forum to engage with the community. Matt Mason wrote 'This is Grime' that 'grime had always been a conversation and Vector Meldrew understood this. This was the birthplace of Wiley's famous rants, where he would often target forum users and resort to either trolling or humorous insults.

The genre was predominantly non-visual in its early stages, meaning you would primarily only hear artists on pirate radio or through their music as opposed to actually seeing what they looked like. This changed with the rise of various DVD series' such as Lord of the Mics, Lord of the Decks, Risky Roadz, Run the Roads and Practise Hours, filmed by amateur videographers such as Roony 'Rsky' Keefe and Troy 'A Plus' Miller. The DVDs often featured artists giving interviews and performing freestyles. These videos often featured record store Rhythm Division on Roman Road in East London, which served as a key community hub for both developing and established Grime MCs during this time. The store was frequented by artists like Wiley, Skepta and Dizzee Rascal before its eventual closure in 2010. Jammer created Lords of the Mics in 2004. The DVD primarily showcased underground artists clashing each other. Lord of the Mics was originally sold by Jammer, Jammer secured an exclusive deal with ukrecordshop.com which helped catapult sales worldwide. The DVD eventually helped smaller grime artists find a platform through selling the DVDs to independent record stores throughout the UK and eventually helping grime form an internet following from uploads to YouTube. This series built a unique platform for artists, because the majority of prior exposure for these artists was through pirate radio. This video series allowed artists to be more visible, and spread their sound.

In 2003, TV channel Channel U was formed (later became Channel AKA, now Now 70s). It would become one of the most important places for people to discover new grime music.

In 2004, grime received its first UK Top 20 single with Lethal Bizzle's song "Pow! (Forward)". The song would prove controversial for the alleged fights it caused in clubs, leading to many venues banning the song from being played. This made it difficult for Lethal Bizzle to find a platform to perform his music. Lethal stated in 2012 to The Guardian that he was unable to play in urban clubs for over a year due to the bans placed on him. Many other grime artists also experienced difficulties performing in clubs due to Form 696, a police risk assessment form that many clubs were asked to fill in by the Metropolitan police. The form was created in 2005 after a spate of gun violence in clubs. The form was criticised in 2009 by John Whittingdale, a Conservative Party MP, for being "draconian". The form was also criticised for allegedly targeting black music nights due to it asking specifically what ethnic groups may be attending the event. Many grime raves were shut down by police using the form. Lethal Bizzle stated in 2012 this led to a shift from making grime music for the clubs, to making grime music for "in-your-house listening". Form 696 has been blamed for contributing to the decline in popularity grime experienced during the late 2000s.

Logan Sama's show on radio station Kiss FM was one of the only daytime radio shows that would regularly play grime during the 2000s.

=== Decline ===
By the late 2000s, grime had begun to enter into a decline. Record labels, radio, and the media struggled with knowing what to do with grime, and as a result limited its impact and exposure. The rise of dubstep and UK funky also made it harder for grime to gain a limelight. Many grime MCs also began to move towards commercial electro house-influenced rap and away from grime music. Artists such as Tinchy Stryder, Chip, and Wiley began to shift away from grime music and instead began releasing music with pop elements to much success. Wiley's track "Wearing My Rolex", produced by Bless Beats, has been credited for kickstarting this wave of commercialisation, but while it managed to gain a number 2 spot in the official singles chart, many of the initial attempts to replicate this success failed. Tinchy Stryder's "Stryderman" only managed to peak of No. 73, while Roll Deep's "Do Me Wrong" failed to chart at all. Skepta's "Rolex Sweep" only peaked at number 86, although it did briefly start a dance craze after it was released, received a remix by the band Coldplay, and featured on the comedy show Misfits. Dizzee Rascal found more success than most, with his songs such as "Dance wiv Me" finding itself on the number one spot on the UK Singles Chart. The wave of commercialised music received some criticism from fellow grime artists for being inauthentic to the original sound.

Another commercialisation that happened during this period was grindie, which fused grime with indie rock.

Grime did still have some success during this period, such as the popular Tempa T song "Next Hype" released in 2009. "Pow" by Lethal Bizzle was dubbed the 'unofficial song' of the 2010 student protests. The grime scene outside of London was also flourishing in the midlands, particularly in Birmingham. In 2008, GrimeForum was created by Hijj. The forum was a major platform for grime music at the time, providing a space for artists to promote themselves and a space for fans to discuss grime as a whole, something that was important to people outside of London due to the lack of information they had access to. Canadian artist Tre Mission credited the forum's importance in his early growth.

The lack of media attention towards grime, or any mainstream platforms that would reliably showcase grime, gave rise to internet platforms such as SB.TV (formed in 2006), Link Up TV (formed in 2008), and Grime Daily (formed in 2009, now known as GRM Daily). With their initial focus only on grime music (though this has since changed), these platforms provided an easy outlet for artists to funnel their music through and gain fame from, collectively creating an ecosystem that allows artists to easily record, produce, and release music to the masses without the need of support from traditional media or the music industry.

In 2012, Charlie Sloth created "Fire in the Booth" on BBC 1Xtra (later moved to Apple Music). The show became a popular segment and granted grime MCs and UK hip-hop artists a large platform to showcase themselves.

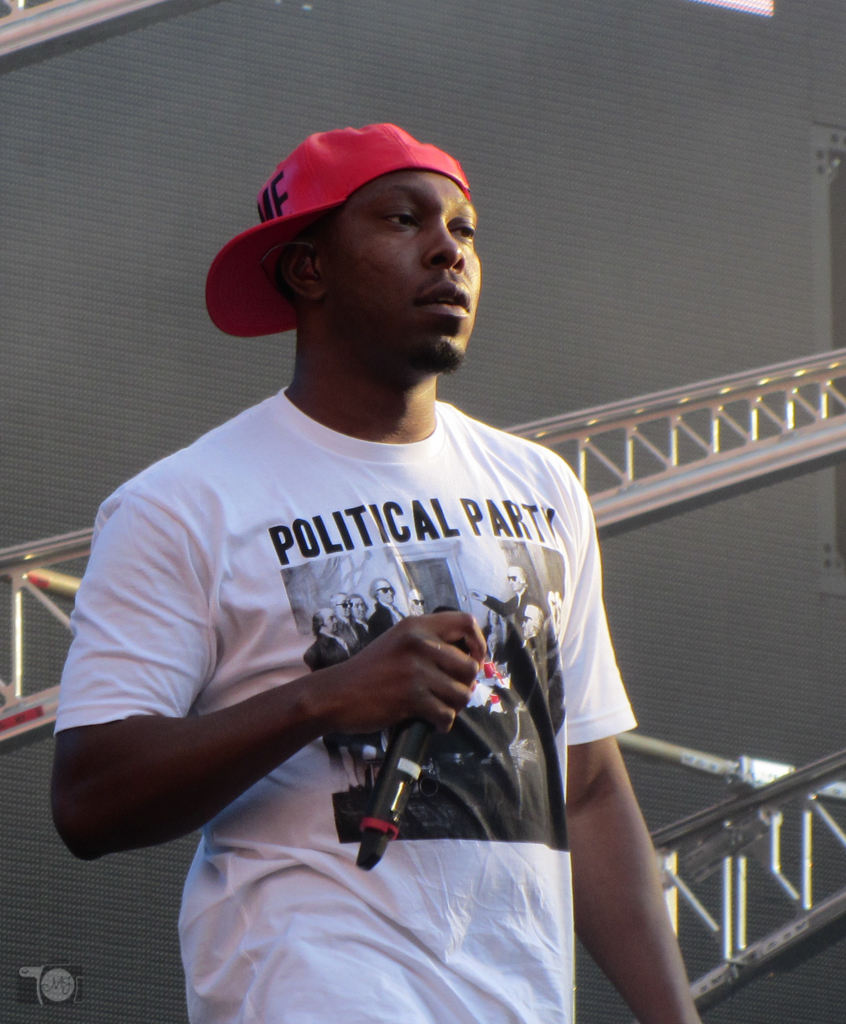
Dizzee Rascal performing in 2013

=== Revival ===
In 2011, a new edition of Lord of the Mics was released, the first since 2006. Lord of the Mics is a series of grime clashes hosted by Jammer. Both the LOTM III DVD and CD charted. Wiley, inspired by the return of LOTM, also brought back Eskimo Dance the following year, a grime rave from the 2000s that had been discontinued. Jammer suggested that the success of Eskimo Dance encouraged more grime raves to be held than had been previously.

By 2013, a revival of instrumental grime was occurring in the underground, with a new wave of producers experimenting with grime music. Logos, who was credited by FactMag for initiating the revival, credited the fall of dubstep as inspiration for going back to grime and reimagining it. In 2013, just a year prior to grime's resurgence in the mainstream, a large 'war dub' occurred amongst dozens of grime producers. It started off with grime producer Bless Beats releasing "Wardub" on Twitter, followed by a response from Shizznit which also included disses towards various producers within the scene, who in-turn followed up with their own diss instrumentals.

In the following year, grime experienced a commercial MC-led revival, initiated by the success of Meridian Dan's "German Whip" featuring Big H and Jme. The song reached number 13 in the UK Singles Charts. Two months after that, Skepta reached number 21 in the UK Singles Chart with his single "That's Not Me" featuring his brother Jme. Two months later, Lethal Bizzle released the single "Rari WorkOut" featuring Jme and Tempa T, which also charted, peaking at number 11 in the UK Singles Charts. A wave of new successful young grime MC's also began to emerge, such as Stormzy, AJ Tracey, Novelist, Jammz, and Lady Leshurr.

In 2015, Kanye West invited various grime artists to join him on stage at the Brit Awards. Following criticism of the performance, Stormzy released "Shut Up", using the 2004 instrumental "Functions on the Low" produced by XTC, a member of Ruff Sqwad. The song was a massive hit for Stormzy and helped further popularise grime music. Stormzy's performance of the song during the ring walk to Anthony Joshua's Heavyweight boxing match with Dillian Whyte further pushed the song higher up the charts, eventually peaking at number eight on the UK Singles Chart. In February 2016, Ministry of Sound and DJ Maximum released a grime compilation entitled Grime Time, which topped the UK compilations chart.

In May 2016, Skepta's fourth studio album, Konnichiwa, entered the UK Albums Chart at number two. The album was awarded the 2016 Mercury Prize, and was later credited for introducing grime to a new generation of fans. In January 2017, Wiley released his eleventh studio album Godfather, debuting at number 9 in the charts.

In February 2017, Stormzy's Gang Signs & Prayer was the first grime album to reach number one on the UK Albums Chart. In June, the British Phonographic Industry reported that grime sales had risen over 100% with physical sales growing over 109%, digital sales 51% and streaming up 138%. This led to the Official Charts saying grime had "smashed" its way into the mainstream.

=== Post-revival period ===
By 2018, grime's momentum had begun to slow down. Grime's rise has been credited for 'opening the door' for competing genres, such as afroswing and UK drill, that had begun to take the limelight. With grime music's popularity being supplanted by competing genres, a number of popular artists shifted away from grime, such as Stormzy, AJ Tracey, and Aitch. Despite grime's lull in the UK, a newer grime scene began to emerge in Brazil. In 2019, Stormzy became the first grime artist to headline Glastonbury Festival. In 2024, Flowdan became the first ever grime MC to earn a Grammy award.

While still no longer in the limelight, the early-mid 2020s would bring grime a new wave of popularity through new social media platforms (such as TikTok). A number of producers, such as BexBlu, oakland, wilfred, became prominent on TikTok through their 'mellow grime' refixes of old grime music. In addition, DJ's such as DJ AG and Mak10 making use of TikToks live-streaming features to live-stream grime sets, and platforms such as PenGame Rap Battle, gained popularity around this time period.

== National growth ==
As grime became more popular in the UK throughout the mid-2000s, it spread out of London to other major British cities. Birmingham, Manchester, Nottingham, Leeds, Sheffield, Blackpool, and Bristol now have grime MCs who are currently gaining major exposure in the scene and have featured on Lord of the Mics, an annual DVD released by Boy Better Know's Jammer.

The national growth of the grime scene has also been evident with many grime artists playing on the urban music stages of the big summer festivals such as Glastonbury, Reading and Leeds, T in the Park and O2 Wireless Festival in Hyde Park. Dizzee Rascal played at all these events in the summer of 2008.

In 2015, Manchester grime artist Bugzy Malone was involved in a heavily publicised grime feud with London-based MC Chip who had created controversy with comments during a Fire in the Booth session. The feud catapulted Bugzy Malone to national fame and he has so far released three commercial projects, all debuting in the top 10 in the UK with his latest album charting at number four.

The largest scene outside London is based in Birmingham and the wider Birmingham area.

So Solid Crew influenced many grime artists, their raw dark track "Dilemma" considered by some to be one of the first grime songs ever.

Mike Skinner released an EP entitled All Got Our Runnins, which featured a number of grime MCs on the remixes of some of his tracks. Skinner also produced and featured on Kano's 2005 hit single "Nite Nite", from the critically acclaimed Home Sweet Home album.

In 2006, the second in the series of Lord of the Mics DVDs was released. It featured Devilman from Birmingham, clashing Skepta. Devilman's appearance on Lord of the Mics is one of the earliest examples of a Midlands MC at the forefront of the scene and is credited by Jammer with helping to break down the stigma of accents from outside London over grime music. The clash is considered to be one of the greatest in the LOTM series with artists such as Drake praising it. Devilman would later link up with Mike Skinner to appear on the remix of "Prangin' Out".

In 2007, Trilla released the single "G Star", produced by the Dwellaz. A fusion of grime and bassline, it became an underground hit. Several other tracks were released during this time which were also well received by fans, such as Slash's "Birmingham" and C4's "Oorite".

In 2009, Wolverhampton producer S-X released the Woooo Riddim, which was widely regarded as one of the most successful instrumentals that year, with many MCs recording their own vocals over the beat.

By the early 2010s, the grime scene in Birmingham was well established and the city hosted several highly successful events called 'Goonies' at the Rainbow Warehouse in Digbeth. These events attracted some of the biggest names in grime, most notably P-Money, who referenced the events on his single "Slang Like This".

Other prominent artists include Deadly, who formed the grime group N.O.D.B, the first group from Birmingham to feature on BBC Radio 1Xtra; Mayhem, who is also a founding member of N.O.D.B, known for his bombastic sound and his 2012 feud with Wiley, C4, Sox, JayKae and SafOne. Many Birmingham artists have now had success outside the Birmingham region in recent years. The fourth edition of Lady Leshurr's "Queen's Speech" freestyle has gained over 28 million views on YouTube as of May 2016. In 2016, Lady Leshurr won a MOBO award for the best Female Act.

As well as hosting large events, the pirate radio scene includes stations such as Silk City Radio, where Birmingham DJ Big Mikee hosts a regular slot between 10-12pm every Sunday.

Birmingham producers such as Preditah and Swifta Beater have become established figures in the grime scene, with leading artists such as Wiley giving recognition to their contribution to grime. In 2011, Preditah released his Solitaire EP; a collection of four grime instrumentals. This EP reached number 1 on the iTunes album charts.

=== Comedy in Grime ===
Channel U commissioned the first grime comedy series in 2002: The Booo Krooo, made by RWDmag.com founding team members Matt Mason and Vector Meldrew. The series was acquired by the BFI National Archive in 2026 as part of its Online Video collection. Ian Mcquaid from RansomNote wrote: "Boo Kroo were essentially a proto version of People Just Do Nothing. After proving a popular feature in the magazine, they levelled up to real world status by recording a track produced by a peak form Sticky."

Comedy, satire, and playing on stereotypes would become a common theme in grime music, with artists such as Mr Wong, Bearman, and Big Narstie, Junior Spesh, and Tempa T employing humour in their music. In 2006, Afrikan Boy's "One Day I Went to Lidl" song went viral gaining over a million views on YouTube by 2007.

2014 saw the release of People Just Do Nothing, a mockumentary series that parodied UK garage, pirate radio culture, and the early stages of grime. In 2017, the show won 'Best Scripted Comedy' at the BAFTA Awards. In June 2018, grime MC Big Narstie and comedian Mo Gilligan launched The Big Narstie Show on Channel 4.

In November 2019, IKEA UK used grime MC D Double E as the voice of their Christmas advert 'Silence the Critics'. D Double E wrote a song talking about how dirty the house was and the lyrics were placed over animated household items.

== International growth ==
The 2005 release of 679 Recordings' Run the Road compilation showcased some of the most popular grime releases to that point, increasing the popularity and fame of grime and grime artists internationally. A particularly notable grime artist who has had success overseas is Lady Sovereign, who appeared on Late Show with David Letterman, signed to Jay-Z's Roc-A-Fella Records, and whose "Love Me or Hate Me" became the first video by a British artist to reach number one on MTV's Total Request Live.

It was not until the release of his third album, 2007's Maths + English, that Dizzee Rascal experienced international acclaim. He was nominated for the Mercury Music Prize again, and despite the fact that the album was not released in the United States in 2007, it received high praise from international music critics, magazines, websites and blogs, including Pitchfork Media, Rolling Stone, and Rock Sound. By 2010, he had achieved three number one singles in a row.

In Canada, British Man Dem (B.M.D.), a grime collective originally from the UK, popularised grime with their radio show "Brits in the 6ix" in 2008 in which they brought grime artists to the spotlight in Canada. More Canadian grime artists appeared in the Toronto area during the 2010s, most notably by Canadian grime artist Tre Mission, one of the first North American artists to be associated with the predominantly United Kingdom-based grime genre. Drake also proved helpful in bringing grime to the spotlight in Canada; Skepta's single Shutdown sampled a video by Drake, and Skepta later worked on Drake's More Life project.

Various UK MC's have had successful tours in New Zealand, such as Wiley, Stormzy and Eyez. Stormzy's album Gang Signs & Prayer reached No.14 in the New Zealand charts. A grime tour known as Eskimo Dance was intended to occur in Australia and New Zealand in late 2018, featuring MC's Wiley, Lethal Bizzle, Devlin, P Money & Little Dee, President T and producers DJ Target and Rude Kid. It was anticipated to be the 'biggest ever' grime tour in New Zealand. The event was cancelled in late 2018 by Wiley himself for unclear reasons. New Zealand grime MC Stanza Switch Blade and NZ grime crew Spreading The Sickness (STS Crew) have both featured on Risky Roadz, a long-running influential grime video series wherein MC's are made to freestyle over handpicked beats.

In the late 2010s and early 2020s, a number of collaborations and genre-blending projects between South African and UK gqom musical artists and grime MCs; examples include Lady Lykez, Scratcha DVA and Novelist.

=== Australian grime ===
Some DJ's, such as Lady Erica, were playing British grime by the mid-2000s in Australia but it was not common place. UK-born Fraksha is widely regarded as a pioneer of the scene in Australia. Fraksha originally started MC'ing in UK Hip-Hop crew Nine High alongside Scotty Hinds and Byron during the early 2000s. Nine High released two successful UK Hip-Hop mixtapes and performed alongside fellow UK Hip-Hop pioneers including Skinnyman and Klashnekoff. At the time, both Fraksha and Scotty Hinds were involved with the local London rave scenes and were exposed to grime, Jungle and Dubstep. In 2006, both Fraksha and Scotty Hinds would move to Australia and get involved with the local scene there. Fraksha and Scotty Hinds, alongside local MC's Diem and Murky, formed the first Australian based grime collective, Smash Brothers, in 2008. By 2010, the collective was booking grime shows and doing radio sets around Australia. Smash Brothers pioneered what would become Australian grime music, and were known for their high energy performances.

In 2010, Fraksha released the first official Australian grime release called It's Just Bars. The mixtape was a success, and was awarded 'Mix-tape of the year' by Ozhiphop Awards.

For the most part, few members of Smash Brothers initially released a lot of music other than Fraksha, but all were active in the raving scene where they would go on to expose many to grime music. They also worked with UK based artists such as Skepta, Foreign Beggars and Dexplicit. Another first for Fraksha was the launch of Melbourne radio show The Sunday Roast on KissFM with Affiks, dedicated to grime and Dubstep music. In 2011 he started the first Australian grime night alongside Affiks and Arctic called 50/50. Fraksha in 2011 would go on to perform in New Zealand alongside UK grime pioneer Dizzee Rascal.

The resurgence grime was experiencing in the UK during the mid-2010s would also reach Australia. Many British MC's, including Footsie, D Double E, Stormzy, Skepta and Wiley would have successful tours in Australia. In late 2018, a UK MC tour Eskimo Dance was scheduled to occur in Australia featuring MCs Wiley (who created Eskimo Dance), Lethal Bizzle, Devlin, P Money & Little Dee, President T and producers DJ Target and Rude Kid. The event was anticipated to the 'biggest grime event' to ever occur in Australia. It was cancelled just prior to schedule by Wiley himself for unclear reasons.

The sound's resurgence also affected the popularity of grime in Australia, with various other Australian MC's picking up the sound with success, such as Diem, Alex Jones, Shadow, Talakai, Nerve, Wombat and Seru.

Grime continues to gain traction in Australia with new artists showing face on a regular basis. Promotions such as Melbourne's 50/50 Grime Melbourne and Invasion Crew Perth heavily incorporate the UK's "Rave" style setup for live performances.

Sonically speaking, Aussie grime is similar to its UK counterpart aside from the local accents and slang. The Australian hip hop scene also has a significant influence on the sound.

=== Brazilian grime ===
During the early- to mid-2000s, British electronic music was crossing over into Brazil in the form of Dubstep, UK garage, and grime, leading to local DJ's to mix the various sounds into their sets, and set-up events and parties dedicated to the genres. This in-turn led to a small interest in grime music, culminating in early releases such as "Cidadão Comum Refém", released by MV Bill (influenced by a Dizzee Rascal CD) in 2002, and "Vou Keimah!", produced by Bruno Belluomini featuring MC Jimmy Luv. "Vou Keimah!" was premiered in 2005 at a São Paulo called Tranquera and later premiered by British DJ Kode9 on Rinse FM. Brazilian MC Vandal is also an early Brazilian grime pioneer from the 2000s period.

Grime in Brazil would fade by the late 2000s; however, it would be picked up again during grime's resurgence around 2014 in Rio de Janeiro, São Paulo. Influenced by artists such as Skepta and Dizzee Rascal, a new crop of DJ's and MC's emerged, such as Fleezus, Febem, Diniboy, SD9, Kbrum, Turistas de Guerra, 03 Noxio, and others. Antonio Constantino and Diniboy came up with the idea for a Brasil Grime Show, a radio show modelled after British grime radio sets, such as the Grime Show on London radio station Rinse FM, wherein a DJ will play instrumentals and invite an MC to perform over them for an extended period. The show is recorded at Casa do Meio Studio in Bangu, Rio de Janeiro. Similar to early British grime music, the group has a lack of financial support in making music. New Brazilian MC's, such as Leall, have experienced growth after appearing on the show. Leall's episode in particular has over 80 thousand views. Antonio Constantino and Diniboy grouped up with local DJ's and producers Lucas Sá, Diego Padilha, Yvie Oliveira, and Rennan Guerra in order to create the show, regularly inviting local MC's to perform over grime instrumentals. Brasil Grime Show has also held grime events in Botafogo, Duque de Caxias, and Copacabana. The Brasil Grime Show has been credited with helping the growth of grime music in Brazil.

In October 2019, Febem and Fleezus visited the UK and performed on GrimeReportTV and Pyro Radio. This visit was also accompanied by a documentary filmed in London about Brazilian grime, first premiered on October 18 in São Paulo. They also performed a cypher alongside British MC's Eyez, Yizzy, and Jevon for Red Bull.

In March 2020, Febem, Fleezus, and producer Cersv released an EP titled BRIME ("brime" itself being a nickname for the Brazilian grime scene). It featured collaborations with British MC's Jevon and Teeboi. In 2021, it was re-released in vinyl in collaboration with Butterz.

Brazilian grime has incorporated elements of the local genre baile funk to their sound. Puterrier described his sound as "70% funk, 30% grime".

=== Chinese grime ===
A relatively small grime scene exists in China, particularly centred around Shanghai and to some extent, Beijing. The scene was started by two British expats Naaah and Alta. Around 2015, Alta's and Naaah's label Push & Pull and promoter Puzzy Stack began promoting grime parties. In Shanghai, these were primarily hosted in a club called The Shelter. Many local producers would go to the club to showcase their music. The club was shut down in late 2016 due to licensing problems and they would later move to All Club.

A style of grime known as 'sinogrime' which incorporates elements of East Asian motifs first began being noticed in China by 2009, and would influence local producers. Shanghai based producer Swimful remixed Wiley's sinogrime instrumental "Shanghai" in 2016. Beijing based producer Howie Lee also produced an album with Sinogrime elements, called "Mù Chè Shān Chū".

Unlike grime elsewhere, Chinese grime is mostly instrumental due to the lack of local MCs. According to Puzzy Stack, a grime promoter based in Beijing, the fast intensity of grime makes it difficult for Chinese MCs to rap over. Clubs play a large role in the scene, holding grime nights wherein local DJs and producers can come and showcase their music. Producers sometimes include samples and references from local pop-culture like Kung-Fu movies or Mandopop.

In 2016, UK grime MC Novelist and AJ Tracey visited Shanghai and played alongside local grime producers. Killa P, P Money and Japanese MCs Pakin and Dekishi have also visited.

In 2018, Chinese rapper After Journey (艾福杰尼 Àifújiéní) visited the UK to film a documentary about grime alongside UK MC Cadell. As well as the documentary, Cadell and After Journey made the first ever grime song featuring a UK & Chinese MC called "2 Much", which was later featured by DJ Target on BBC Radio 1xtra.

=== Japanese grime ===
In 2004, Japanese DJ's had already begun to play grime music from the UK. In 2008, a group of MC's from Osaka emerged who were inspired by Roll Deep's Rules And Regulations mixtape, led by pioneers MC Dekishi, MC Duff and MC Tacquilacci. MC Dekishi released the first ever Japanese grime mixtape in 2009, titled "Grime City Volume 1". Osaka MCs are known for rapping extremely fast. Another scene sprung up in the Tokyo region of Shibuya led by Carpainter, Double Clapperz, MC ONJUICY, PAKIN and Sakana Lavenda. PAKIN visited the UK in 2013 where he was invited by Devilman to join the Dark Elements crew. However, Japanese Grime has stayed an underground genre in Japan with little local media attention.

In 2013, over a hundred Japanese grime producers participated in a producer clash called War Dub Japan Cup which garnered a massive response in the UK. In 2014, Elijah and Skilliam held a set with Japanese MC's and Producers that went viral via media outlets like SB.TV and GRM Daily receiving significant attention in the UK.

In November 2018, record label Butterz celebrated its eighth anniversary at Tokyo based club Unit. Butterz are notable for having an early investment into the Japanese grime scene; this goes back as far as 2009, when Japanese producers would send the label beats via MSN Messenger.

Japanese grime has more DJs than it does MCs; as a result, the former takes more importance. Lyrical content differs to UK grime, with a lack of crime related lyrics and more of a focus on societal and political issues, with rebellious counterculture elements. Japanese Grime uses samples and references from local pop-culture like Anime, Japanese Idols and J-pop.

== Musical style ==
Grime is typified by complex 2-step, 4/4 breakbeats, generally around 140 beats per minute, or sometimes structured around a double-time rhythm, and constructed from different synth, string and electronic sounds. Self-proclaimed 'godfather' of grime Wiley claims in his 2017 autobiography Eskiboy that he personally created most of his early tracks at 140 BPM as it is the default tempo in FL Studio. Stylistically, grime draws on many genres including UK garage, drum and bass, hip hop and dancehall. The lyrics and music combine futuristic electronic elements and dark, guttural basslines.

Grime predominantly evolved from the UK speed garage scene and genre towards the latter stages, although it takes influences from other genres. According to Sasha Frere-Jones of The New Yorker, grime has developed a fierce sound by "distilling" rhythms to a minimal style resulting in a choppy, off-centre sound. Whereas hip hop is inherently dance music, the writer argues that "grime sounds as if it had been made for a boxing gym, one where the fighters have a lot of punching to do but not much room to move." Frere-Jones also states that grime has maintained a style different to hip hop. Hattie Collins supports Frere-Jones' analysis, asserting that grime is "an amalgamation of UK garage with a bit of drum & bass, a splash of punk".

According to Alex de Jong and Marc Schuilenburg, grime music also samples sawtooth wave sounds (chiptunes) from video game music and ringtones which had become part of everyday life in London and other parts of the country; Street Fighter II, for example, is frequently sampled and referenced, as grime is "built around lyrical clashes" which are "equated with Street Fighter's 1 on 1 battles". British grime lyrics often reference communication technologies popular with artists and listeners such as smartphones and social media. Sirpixalot recently brought attention to the game Wolverine: Adamantium Rage from 1994 which bears some of the hallmarks sounds of grime.

== Subgenres and styles ==
Many of the various subgenres and styles of grime, such as 8-bar, nu shape, eskibeat and sublow, were initially names applied to the genre as a whole. In the early 2000s, "grime" had negative connotations for being a "dirty word" and received resistance from within the scene. Over time the various names would encapsulate different niches, while "grime" eventually won out to become the overarching name.

=== 8-bar ===
According to cultural sociologist Monique Charles, grime is typically characterised by four beats to a bar, in 8 or 16 bar cycles. It is one of the reasons why grime was unofficially called 8 bar or 16 bar in its formative years. 8-bar is a subgenre or style of grime, first seen in Youngstar's "Pulse X" instrumental. 8-bar instrumentals switch beats every eight bars, meaning that each 8 bars the MC would be rapping over a different rhythm. This was in contrast to "nu shape", another style of grime which encouraged 16–32 bar patterns.

=== Darkside ===
Darkside was a subgenre pioneered by Terminator. Darkside is defined by its dark, sluggish, and violent content, similar to road rap but over grime instrumentals. Only a few other MCs have tried making the subgenre, such as Shxdow.

=== Eskibeat ===
Eskibeat was initially a name given to music by Wiley before grime was the agreed-upon title. The term "eskibeat" is derived from Eskimo, a name for indigenous people who live in the extremely cold northern circumpolar region. This reflected Wiley's mindset at the time, which was both "angry" and "cold-hearted". Eskibeat would later develop into a subgenre of grime, defined by the "futuristic, icy cold synths, devastating basslines and awkward, off-kilter rhythms" pioneered by Wiley in tracks like "Igloo" and "Eskimo", one of the first examples of grime music and eskibeat. Eskibeat production has had a massive impact on grime music, and has had an influence on UK drill.

Notable producers of Eskibeat are Wiley, Zomby, Danny Weed, and Lewi B.

=== Rhythm & grime ===
Rhythm & grime, also known as R&G or R'n'G, is a subgenre pioneered in 2004–2005 by producers Terror Danjah, DaVinChe and Scratcha DVA, along with the support of BBC 1Xtra's DJ Cameo. The subgenre mixed grime with R&B, showcasing a softer side of grime, often with accompanying R&B vocals, while keeping the 140bpm rugged sound of grime. Many UK R&B singers, such as Sadie Ama, Lady Ny, Katie Pearl, and Gemma Fox, would perform over R&G instrumentals, usually without an MC rapping alongside them. Many grime artists also made various R&G tracks, such as Ruff Sqwad, Wiley, Kano, Skepta and Dizzee Rascal. Producers such as Blackjack, Iron Soul, Low Deep and Kid D also incorporated R&G elements into their instrumentals. Lady Ny has stated she was the first woman to sing on grime, and the first woman to bring out a grime mixtape.

There was some push back against R&G from people who felt it was too Americanised, such as DJ Logan Sama who referred to R&G as having "gimmicks". According to Terror Danjah, after making the track "So Sure" with Kano and Sadie Ama, grime MC Crazy Titch initially told him to stop making "girl tunes", although he would later request Terror produce one for himself.

In 2006, Scratcha DVA released the album The Voice of Grime featuring 22 different singers. It was unique at the time due to being the first project to have so many different women singing over grime instrumentals; however, the sound would mostly disappear after the album was released. Many of the R&B singers that were singing over R&G were inconsistent and would regularly disappear.

The subgenre made a comeback in the 2010s after American singer Kelela released a mixtape in 2013, Cut 4 Me, featuring a heavy R&G influence. In 2014, she collaborated with British artist Bok Bok to make Melba's Call, another modern take on R&G. Terror Danjah formed R&G Records, a record label dedicated to R&G. In 2017, Terror Danjah and Olivia Louise released "I'll Follow U" on the label.

In 2018, Gemma Fox released Grime Vocals Archive, a collection of previously unreleased or unheard rhythm & grime songs.

=== Sinogrime ===
Sinogrime is a term coined by Kode9 in 2005 to describe a style of grime that incorporated East Asian motifs, such as traditional East Asian instruments and samples from vintage Kung Fu films. The style was present before this, however. Earlier examples include Jammer's instrumental "Chinaman" which was released in 2003 and included a sample from the 1993 martial arts film Twin Warriors. The sound was initially pioneered by many people, such as DJ Target, Wiley, Terror Danjah, Ruff Sqwad, Jammer, Geeneus, DJ Wonder and Wookie. In a 2003 interview, Wiley stated he "used to watch a lot of Kung Fu films" and used to go to a store called Sterns to find world music to sample. Dizzee Rascal stated his song "Brand New Day", released in 2003, was also inspired by Kung Fu films.

The term does not necessarily apply to grime made in Japan or China, unless the instrumental includes East Asian motifs. Sinogrime first began being noticed in China in 2009 and would influence local producers, particularly in Shanghai and Beijing. Shanghai-based producer Swimful remixed Wiley's sinogrime instrumental "Shanghai" in 2016. Beijing-based producer Howie Lee also produced an album with Sinogrime elements, called Mù Chè Shān Chū. Howie Lee described sinogrime as "propaganda", a sound that represents an image in people's heads, but one that is not necessarily accurate.

Sinogrime was described by music critic Dan Hancox as a genre that "barely existed". Dan Hancox suggested that sinogrime reflected a shift away from looking towards America for influence, and instead looking East. This was possibly the result of the rising popularity of Japanese video games and Chinese movies which featured music from their respective countries. Both Wiley and Dizzee Rascal have stated they were inspired by Kung-Fu movies.

Sinogrime would see a resurgence in the 2010s via producers like Fatima Al Qadiri, Slackk, Walton and JT The Goon. In 2014, Kuwaiti producer Fatima Al Qadiri released Asiatisch, which had a heavy sinogrime influence and was highly acclaimed, although Fatima was actually unaware of the term "sinogrime" whilst she was making the album. In 2015, Kid D released the Shaolin Struggle EP.

=== Sublow ===
Sublow was an early subgenre of grime, and one of the early names that was used to refer to the entire genre.

The subgenre is defined by its heavy synths, edgy rhythms and deep low bass. The sound was initially pushed by Jon E Cash, Dread D (T Williams) and other members of the Black Ops collective.

=== Weightless ===
Weightless is a sound that appeared during the mid 2010s, pioneered by Logos and Mumdance. Weightless is defined by its atmospheric, minimal and ambient sound, giving it a "weightless" feel. Logos compared it to "Devil Mixes", which is a grime instrumental where the drums have been stripped, primarily popularised by Wiley, which he had wanted to expand upon. However weightless goes much further than that, stripping away the typical aggressiveness of a grime track. Mumdance was encouraged to make the sound after being annoyed with the drum infested tracks that DJ's were playing at clubs, without any contrast in-between. Weightless is also influenced by the noise genre.

Mumdance and Logos' label, Different Circles, have released two "Weightless" mixtapes showcasing the sound, featuring producers like Rabit, Inkke, Dark0, Murlo, Logos and Strict Face. Mr. Mitch was another notable producer of the subgenre.

== Criticism ==
As with many similar scenes around the world, grime has encountered some criticism, especially from government officials such as Kim Howells, who made comments that some grime supporters claimed to find "deeply racist", referring to popular artists and crews as "boasting macho idiot rappers". In 2006, David Cameron criticised grime music for "encouraging people to carry guns and knives". A counter argument is given by Jeff Chang in an article in The Village Voice, where he said Dizzee Rascal's often violent and sexual lyrics are heralded as "capturing, encapsulating, and preserving" the life that he and his peers live on the streets every day.
