= Booo! =

2001 single by Sticky feat. Ms. Dynamite

Single by Sticky featuring Ms. Dynamite
- Released: 11 June 2001
- Recorded: 2000
- Genre: UK garage
- Length: 5:26
- Label: FFRR, Public Demand
- Songwriters: Richard Forbes, Jason Kaye, Ms. Dynamite
- Producers: Richard Forbes, Jason Kaye, Ms. Dynamite

Ms. Dynamite singles chronology
"Booo!" (2001)	"It Takes More" (2002)

"Booo!" is a song by UK garage DJ/producer Sticky featuring Ms. Dynamite. It was the first single Ms. Dynamite appeared on before the release of her debut solo single the following year. The song was a top 20 hit, peaking at No. 12 on the UK Singles Chart and No. 1 on the UK Dance Singles Chart.

The Guardian listed the song at number 19 in their list of "The best UK garage tracks - ranked!" in 2019.

Mixmag included "Booo!" in their list of "40 of the best UK garage tracks released from 1995 to 2005".

Gemtracks included the song in their list of the "top UK garage songs between 1995–2005".

== Track listings ==
UK 12" single
A1. "Booo!" (original dirty mix) – 5:26
A2. "Booo!" (Medieval Hooligans Longshanks remix) – 4:57
B. "Booo!" (Audio Drives Midi Madness mix) – 6:53

UK CD maxi-single

1. "Booo!" (original dirty mix) – 5:26
2. "Booo!" (Medieval Hooligans Longshanks remix) – 4:57
3. "Booo!" (Dubaholics numb dub mix edit) – 5:14
4. "Booo!" (Headquarters acoustic radio remix) – 3:17

== Charts ==
Chart (2001)	Peak position
UK Singles (OCC)	12
UK Dance (OCC)	1
