= Example discography =

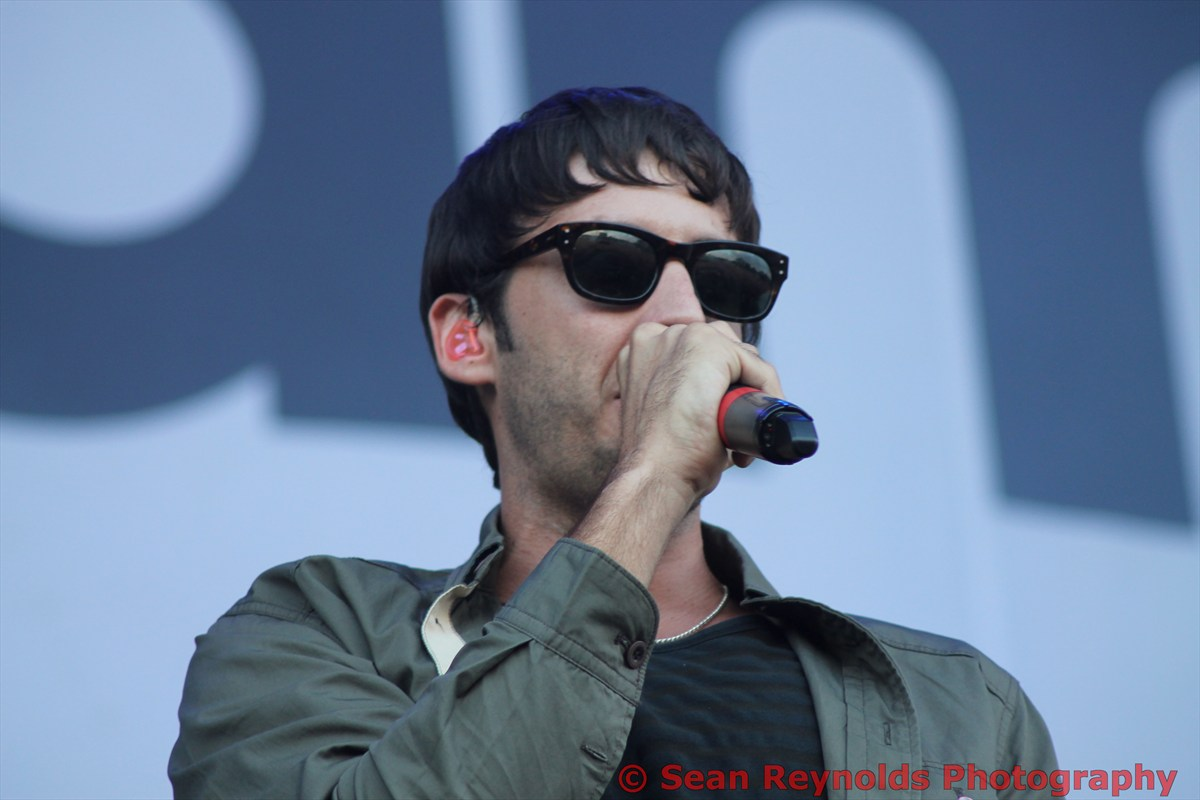
- Example performing in 2012
- Studio albums: 8
- Compilation albums: 3
- Singles: 58
- Music videos: 53
- Mixtapes: 3
- Remix albums: 1
- Featured singles: 15

The discography of Example, a British singer, consists of eight studio albums, fifty-eight singles and 53 music videos. As of March 2014, Example has achieved fifteen top forty singles on the UK Singles Chart, including two number-one singles; "Changed the Way You Kiss Me" and "Stay Awake".

Example released his debut studio album What We Made in 2007. It peaked at number 125 in the UK Albums Chart. His second studio album, Won't Go Quietly, was released three years later. It peaked at number four of the same chart and was certified as Gold by the British Phonographic Industry (BPI). Five singles were released from it, and were mild-received in diverse world charts. The next year, Example released Playing in the Shadows, which topped the UK Albums Chart, and included the singles "Changed the Way You Kiss Me" and "Stay Awake", among others. In 2012, The Evolution of Man was released on 19 November. It peaked at the thirteenth spot, and has been certified Gold by the BPI.

In March 2014, Example revealed the name of his 5th studio album to be Live Life Living and the artwork of the standard and deluxe editions, which have been loosely based on his live Ibiza shows by MTV. It includes already released single "All the Wrong Places" which was released on 6 September 2013, the second single "Kids Again" which was released on 14 March 2014 and the third single "One More Day (Stay with Me)" which was released on 20 June 2014. The fourth single is "10 Million People" and was released on 3 October 2014.

== Albums ==
=== Studio albums ===
List of albums, with selected chart positions
Title	Album details	Peak chart positions								Certifications
Title	Album details	UK	UK Dance	AUS	GER	IRE	NZ	SCO	SWI	Certifications
What We Made	Released: 17 September 2007; Label: The Beats; Formats: CD, digital download	125	—	—	—	—	—	—	—	
Won't Go Quietly	Released: 21 June 2010; Label: Ministry of Sound, Data; Formats: CD, digital download	4	1	—	—	26	—	4	—	BPI: Gold
Playing in the Shadows	Released: 4 September 2011; Label: Ministry of Sound, Data; Formats: CD, digital download	1	1	14	43	6	22	3	59	BPI: Platinum
The Evolution of Man	Released: 19 November 2012; Label: Ministry of Sound, Data; Formats: CD, digital download	13	1	40	—	34	—	14	—	BPI: Gold
Live Life Living	Released: 7 July 2014; Label: Epic Records, Sony; Formats: CD, digital download	8	1	—	—	28	—	11	—	
Bangers & Ballads	Released: 17 August 2018; Label: Staneric Recordings; Formats: Digital download	—	3	—	—	—	—	—	—	
Some Nights Last for Days	Released: 12 June 2020; Label: Staneric Recordings; Formats: CD, digital download	—	—	—	—	—	—	—	—	
We May Grow Old But We Never Grow Up	Released: 17 June 2022; Label: BMG; Formats: CD, digital download, LP	64	5	—	—	—	—	37	—	
"—" denotes album that did not chart or was not released.

=== Remix albums ===
Title	Album details
We Didn't Invent the Remix	Released: 2006; Label: All the Chats

=== Mixtapes ===
List of albums, with selected chart positions
Title	Album details
What We Almost Made	Released: 2008; Label: Data
The Credit Munch	Released: 2009; Label: Data
The Big Dog Blog Mix	Released: 2010; Label: Data

=== Compilation albums ===
List of albums, with selected chart positions
Title	Album details	Peak chart positions				Certifications
Title	Album details	UK	UK Dance	IRE	SCO	Certifications
The Very Best of Example (2003–2009)	Released: 2010; Label: Self-released; Format: Free download	—	—	—	—	
Example & DJ Wire Present the Playlist	Released: 13 June 2011; Label: Ministry of Sound (#B0050BSMEK); Format: CD, Digital download	—	—	—	—	
#Hits	Released: 5 August 2013; Label: Ministry of Sound (#B00DP5K0SO); Format: CD, Digital download	11	8	74	12	BPI: Gold
"—" denotes single that did not chart or was not released.

== Singles ==
=== As lead artist ===
Single	Year	Peak chart positions										Certifications	Album
Single	Year	UK	UK Dance	AUS	CZE	FRA	GER	IRE	NZ	SCO	SVK	Certifications	Album
"What We Made"	2006	—	—	—	—	—	—	—	—	—	—		What We Made
"You Can't Rap"	2007	—	—	—	—	—	—	—	—	—	—		What We Made
"I Don't Want To"	2007	167	—	—	—	—	—	—	—	—	—		What We Made
"So Many Roads"	2007	196	—	—	—	—	—	—	—	—	—		What We Made
"Me & Mandy"	2008	—	—	—	—	—	—	—	—	—	—		What We Made
"Hooligans" (with Don Diablo)	2009	—	—	—	—	—	—	—	—	—	—		Won't Go Quietly
"Watch the Sun Come Up"	2009	19	3	—	—	—	—	—	—	27	74	BPI: Silver	Won't Go Quietly
"Won't Go Quietly"	2010	6	1	—	—	11	—	36	33	6	51	BPI: Silver	Won't Go Quietly
"Kickstarts"	2010	3	1	—	9	—	72	8	12	2	12	BPI: 2× Platinum; RMNZ: Gold	Won't Go Quietly
"Last Ones Standing"	2010	27	7	—	—	—	—	37	—	25	—		Won't Go Quietly
"Two Lives"	2010	84	10	—	—	—	—	—	—	—	—		Won't Go Quietly
"Changed the Way You Kiss Me"	2011	1	1	16	22	37	8	3	12	1	38	BPI: 2× Platinum; ARIA: Platinum	Playing in the Shadows
"Stay Awake"	2011	1	1	51	—	—	—	18	—	2	96	BPI: Gold	Playing in the Shadows
"Natural Disaster" (vs. Laidback Luke)	2011	37	7	—	51	—	—	—	—	35	31		Playing in the Shadows
"Midnight Run"	2011	30	5	—	—	—	—	—	—	35	64		Playing in the Shadows
"Say Nothing"	2012	2	1	54	94	—	—	22	—	2	66		The Evolution of Man
"Close Enemies"	2012	37	7	—	—	—	—	—	—	37	—		The Evolution of Man
"Perfect Replacement"	2013	46	9	—	—	—	—	56	—	38	—		The Evolution of Man
"All the Wrong Places"	2013	13	4	—	84	—	—	71	—	11	—		Live Life Living
"Kids Again"	2014	13	6	74	—	—	—	52	—	10	—		Live Life Living
"One More Day (Stay with Me)"	2014	4	2	—	99	—	—	28	—	5	—		Live Life Living
"10 Million People"	2014	—	—	—	—	—	—	—	—	—	—		Live Life Living
"Whisky Story"	2015	96	—	—	—	—	—	—	—	—	—		Non-album singles
"Later"	2016	—	—	—	—	—	—	—	—	—	—		Non-album singles
"The Answer"	2018	—	—	—	—	—	—	—	—	—	—		Non-album singles
"Nine Point Nine" (with Grim Sickers and Bonkaz)	2018	—	—	—	—	—	—	—	—	—	—		Non-album singles
"Back for More" (with Rude Kid)	2018	—	—	—	—	—	—	—	—	—	—		Bangers & Ballads
"Show Me How to Love" (featuring Hayla)	2018	—	—	—	—	—	—	—	—	—	—		Bangers & Ballads
"Sit Down Gary"	2018	—	—	—	—	—	—	—	—	—	—		Bangers & Ballads
"Drops" (with Darkzy)	2018	—	—	—	—	—	—	—	—	—	—		Non-album singles
"All Night"	2019	87	26	—	—	—	—	—	—	69	—		Non-album singles
"Money"	2019	—	—	—	—	—	—	—	—	—	—		Non-album singles
"Click"	2019	—	—	—	—	—	—	—	—	—	—		Non-album singles
"Do It So Well"	2019	—	—	—	—	—	—	—	—	—	—		Non-album singles
"Back on the Wreck"	2020	—	—	—	—	—	—	—	—	—	—		Non-album singles
"Sun Hits Your Eyes"	2020	—	—	—	—	—	—	—	—	—	—		Non-album singles
"Paperclips (Isolation Freestyle)"	2020	—	—	—	—	—	—	—	—	—	—		Some Nights Last for Days
"Erin"	2020	—	—	—	—	—	—	—	—	—	—		Some Nights Last for Days
"Oscar" (featuring P Money and Harry Shotta)	2020	—	—	—	—	—	—	—	—	—	—		Some Nights Last for Days
"Every Single Time" (featuring What So Not and Lucy Lucy)	2021	—	—	—	—	—	—	—	—	—	—		We May Grow Old But We Never Grow Up
"Never Let You Down" (with Kanine featuring Penny Ivy)	2022	—	—	—	—	—	—	—	— (Note: "Never Let You Down" did not enter the NZ Top 40 Singles Chart, but peaked at number 15 on the NZ Hot Singles Chart.)	—	—		We May Grow Old But We Never Grow Up
"Deep" (with Bou featuring Nonô)	2022	—	—	—	—	—	—	—	—	—	—		We May Grow Old But We Never Grow Up
"Gold" (with Alcemist)	2023	—	—	—	—	—	—	—	—	—	—		TBA
"There It Is" (with Ben Nicky)	2023	—	—	—	—	—	—	—	—	—	—		TBA
"Run" (featuring Nu-La)	2024	—	—	—	—	—	—	—	—	—	—		TBA
"Skyscanner" (with Beyond Chicago)	2024	—	—	—	—	—	—	—	—	—	—		TBA
"Head's Gone" (with Local)	2025	—	—	—	—	—	—	—	—	—	—		TBA
"Popstar"	2026	—	—	—	—	—	—	—	—	—	—		TBA
"—" denotes single that did not chart or was not released.

=== As featured artist ===
Single	Year	Peak chart positions									Certifications	Album
Single	Year	UK	UK Dance	AUS	BEL	CZE	IRE	NZ	SCO	SVK	Certifications	Album
"Monster" (Professor Green featuring Example)	2010	29	—	—	—	—	—	—	36	—		Alive Till I'm Dead
"Unorthodox" (Wretch 32 featuring Example)	2011	2	—	—	—	—	32	—	3	—	BPI: Gold	Black and White
"Daydreamer" (Flux Pavilion featuring Example)	2012	39	9	—	—	—	—	—	—	—		Non-album single
"We'll Be Coming Back" (Calvin Harris featuring Example)	2012	2	2	8	51	24	1	16	1	47	BPI: Platinum; ARIA: 3× Platinum; GLF: 3× Platinum; RMNZ: Platinum	18 Months
"Thursday" (Pet Shop Boys featuring Example)	2013	61	—	—	111	—	—	—	—	—		Electric
"Reflections" (Jacob Plant featuring Example)	2015	—	—	—	—	—	—	—	—	—		Non-album single
"Access Denied" (P Money, Big Narstie & Example featuring Takura)	2015	—	—	—	—	—	—	—	—	—		Non-album single
"Reload That: Reloaded" (Jaguar Skills featuring Milli Major, Tempa T, Big Narstie and Example)	2016	—	—	—	—	—	—	—	—	—		Non-album single
"The War Is Over" (Krafty Kuts & Dynamite MC featuring Harry Shotta, Example and Erb'N'Dub)	2016	—	—	—	—	—	—	—	—	—		All 4 Corners
"Don't Wait" (K0:YU featuring Example)	2016	—	—	—	—	—	—	—	—	—		Non-album single
"Lights Out" (Doc Brown featuring Example)	2017	—	—	—	—	—	—	—	—	—		Stemma
"In the Zone" (Jauz featuring Example)	2018	—	—	—	—	—	—	—	—	—		The Wise and The Wicked
"Sink or Swim" (Luude & Example featuring Georgi Kay)	2018	—	—	—	—	—	—	—	—	—		Non-album single
"Round and Round" (Professor Green featuring Example)	2020	—	—	—	—	—	—	—	—	—		Non-album single
"Dead in the Eye" (P Money & Whiney featuring Example)	2022	—	—	—	—	—	—	—	—	—		Streets, Love & Other Stuff
"—" denotes single that did not chart or was not released.

=== Other charted songs ===
Song	Year	Peak chart positions			Album
Song	Year	UK	UK Dance	SCO	Album
"Game Over" (Tinchy Stryder featuring Example, Tinie Tempah, Giggs, Professor Green, Devlin & Chipmunk)	2010	22	2	28	Third Strike
"Shot Yourself in the Foot Again" (Skream & Example)	2011	82	21	—	Playing in the Shadows
"Playing in the Shadows"	2011	155	—	—	Playing in the Shadows
"Access Denied" (P Money, Big Narstie and Example featuring Takura)	2016	—	—	—	Non-album single
"—" denotes single that did not chart or was not released.

== Other appearances ==
Year	Song	Album
2008	"Music Club" (by Chase & Status, uncredited vocals)	More than Alot
2008	"Don't Be Shy" (Devil's Gun featuring Example)	Non-album singles
2008	"McCartney"	Non-album singles
2009	"Pussycat Too" (Don Diablo featuring Example)	Non-album singles
2009	"Instant Replay" (Don Diablo featuring Example)	Non-album singles
2009	"Temptation Avenue"	Non-album singles
2009	"Angels & Demons"	Non-album singles
2009	"It's Not Ova" (A1 Bassline featuring Example)	Virgin EP
2009	"All Over Again"	Won't Go Quietly demo
2009	"Pink Money"	Unreleased
2009	"Love Is a War" (Rogue Traders featuring Example)	Love Is a War EP
2010	"Teenage Dream" (cover of Katy Perry)	Radio 1's Live Lounge - Volume 5
2010	"Look Over Your Shoulder" (Giggs featuring Example)	Take Your Hats Off
2011	"Catch Me if You Can" (D Double E featuring Example)	Bluku! Bluku! EP
2011	"Don't Sit Down 'Cause I've Moved Your Chair"	Radio 1's Live Lounge - Volume 6
2012	"Andy Warhol" (Mikill Pane featuring Example)	You Guest It EP
2012	"Run The World" (David Stewart featuring Example)	Late Night Viewing
2012	"Whisper" (AN21 & Max Vangeli featuring Example)	People of the Night
2012	"War" (Jack Beats featuring Diplo & Example)	Careless EP
2012	"We Found Love"	BBC Radio 1's Live Lounge 2012
2013	"Close Enemies"	BBC Radio 1's Live Lounge 2013
2014	"One Way Ticket" (Ruben Haze featuring Example)	City of Dreams EP
2014	"Dark Horse" (cover of Katy Perry)	BBC Radio 1's Live Lounge 2014
2015	"If You Wanna" (GotSome and Tazer featuring Example and Jammer)	Red Bull Studios London Presents: Monki & Friends EP 3
2016	"Weapons" (KANDY and Funky Craig featuring Example)	Flavors EP
2016	"Headback" (Roska featuring Example)	Non-album single
2016	"Don't Wait" (Deniz Koyu featuring Example)	Don't Wait EP
2017	"Lost in Your Love" (Dirtyphonics featuring Example)	Night Ride EP
2017	"Lights Out" (Doc Brown featuring Example)	Stemma
2018	"Drops" (Darkzy and Example)	Non-album singles
2019	"Another 24" (Jacky and Example)	Non-album singles
2020	"Energy" (Bru-C and Example)	Smile
2021	"Love Don't Fade" (DJ S.K.T and Example)	Non-album single
2024	"Runny Egg" (Vibe Chemistry featuring Local, Window Kid, Example and Elro)	Balance

=== Additional appearances ===
- "Plastic Smile" (with Felguk) – featured as the B-side track of Felguk's "Jack It" EP, as a bonus track in the iTunes version of Playing in the Shadows and in the 2012 video game SSX.

== Songwriting credits ==
Song	Year	Artist	Album	Notes
"Chasing the Sun"	2012	The Wanted	The Wanted	Co-written with Alex Smith
"Led Astray"	2012	Friction	Non-album singles	Vocals by Takura
"Long Gone Memory"	2013	Friction featuring Arlissa	Non-album singles	
"Drunk Texting"	2013	Dev	I Only See You When I'm Dreamin'	Originally set to be released as a single by Example featuring Wretch 32, Avelino and Georgia Ku.

== Music videos ==
Year	Title	Director	Artist	References
2004	"A Pointless Song"		Example	
2004	"Vile"		Example	
2005	"What We Made"		Example	
2005	"So Many Roads" (version one)	James Levelle & Mark Hopkins	Example	
2007	"I Don't Want To"	Henry Scholfield	Example	
2007	"Who Needs Sunshine?"	Henry Scholfield	Example	
2007	"So Many Roads" (version two)		Example	
2007	"You Can't Rap"	Henry Scholfield	Example	
2008	"Me & Mandy"	Henry Scholfield	Example	
2009	"Hooligans"	Ben Newman	Don Diablo & Example	
2009	"Watch the Sun Come Up"	Keith Schofield	Example	
2009	"Won't Go Quietly"	Ben Newman	Example	
2010	"Kickstarts"	James Copeman	Example	
2010	"Last Ones Standing"	James Copeman	Example	
2010	"Two Lives"	James Copeman	Example	
2010	"Monster"		Professor Green (featuring Example)	
2010	"Game Over"	Adam Powell	Tinchy Stryder (featuring Example)	
2011	"Shot Yourself in the Foot Again"	Elliot Gleave & The Chamber Brothers	Skream & Example	
2011	"Unorthodox"	Ben Newman	Wretch 32 (featuring Example)	
2011	"Look Over Your Shoulder"	Oliver Whitehouse	Giggs (featuring Example)	
2011	"Changed the Way You Kiss Me"	Adam Powell	Example	
2011	"Stay Awake"	Adam Powell	Example	
2011	"Natural Disaster"	Ben Peters	Example vs. Laidback Luke	
2011	"Midnight Run"	Adam Powell	Example	
2012	"We'll Be Coming Back"	Saman Keshavarz	Calvin Harris (featuring Example)	
2012	"Say Nothing"	Adam Powell	Example	
2012	"Close Enemies"	Rankin	Example	
2012	"Come Taste the Rainbow"	Rankin	Example	
2013	"Perfect Replacement"	Emil Nava	Example	
2013	"All the Wrong Places"	Emil Nava	Example	
2014	"Kids Again"	Jon Jon Augustavo	Example	
2014	"One More Day (Stay with Me)"	Adam Powell	Example	
2014	"Take Me as I Am"	Elliot Gleave & Kristian Young	Example	
2014	"10 Million People"		Example	
2015	"Whisky Story"	Elliot Gleave & Adam Powell	Example	
2016	"Later"		Example	
2018	"The Answer"	Dominic O’Riordan	Example	
2018	“Nine Point Nine”	Dominic O’Riordan	Example, Grim Sickers & Bonkaz	
2018	"Back for More"	Risky Roadz & Elliot Gleave	Example & Rude Kidd	
2018	"Show Me How to Love"	Risky Roadz & Elliot Gleave	Example (featuring Hayla)	
2018	"Sit Down Gary"	Risky Roadz & Elliot Gleave	Example	
2019	“All Night”	Elliot & Erin Gleave	Example	
2019	“Money”	Elliot & Erin Gleave	Example	
2019	“Click”	Elliot Gleave	Example	
2019	“Do It So Well”	Elliot Gleave	Example	
2020	“Sun Hits Your Eyes”	Elliot Gleave	Example	
2020	“Paperclips (Isolation Freestyle)”	Elliot Gleave	Example	
2020	“Erin”	Elliot Gleave	Example	
2020	“Oscar”	Elliot Gleave	Example (featuring P Money & Harry Shotta)	
2021	“Every Single Time”	Allan Hardy	Example (featuring What So Not & Lucy Lucy)	
2022	“Never Let You Down”		Example (with Kanine featuring Penny Ivy)	
2022	“Deep”		Example (with Bou featuring Nonô)	
2022	“Original”	Elliot Gleave & Curdin Wullschleger	Example	
