= Live Life Living =

Studio album by Example
- Released: 7 July 2014
- Recorded: 2013–2014
- Studio: Sensible Studios; Britannia Row Studios; MyAudiotonic Studios; Metrophonic Studios
- Genre: EDM; electropop
- Length: 47:08
- Label: Epic
- Producer: Alex Smith; Critikal; Example; Fraser T Smith; Jakob Liedholm; Steve Hill; Stuart Price; Sheldrake

Example chronology
| #Hits (2013) | Live Life Living (2014) | Bangers & Ballads (2018) |

Deluxe edition cover

Singles from Live Life Living
- 1. "All the Wrong Places" Released: 6 September 2013; 2. "Kids Again" Released: 14 March 2014; 3. "One More Day (Stay with Me)" Released: 20 June 2014; 4. "10 Million People" Released: 5 October 2014

Live Life Living is the fifth studio album by English recording artist Example. It was released on 7 July 2014 through Epic Records. It entered the UK Albums Chart at number eight.

== Background and development ==
Gleave signed to Epic Records in 2013, leaving Ministry of Sound who had released his past three albums. On 15 April 2013, he stated on Facebook that he was in Los Angeles working on his fifth studio album. Five album tracks were written and produced in Los Angeles with Stuart Price, and the album will consist entirely of productions by Gleave, Price, Fraser T Smith and Alf "Critikal" Bamford. Bamford is responsible for additional production on every track. The lead single from the album, titled "All the Wrong Places", was debuted at his Auckland concert in New Zealand on 24 April. He appeared at the 2013 Glastonbury Festival. Example announced via Twitter that album tracks "All the Wrong Places" and "Only Human" were to be played at all festival gigs in the summer. "All the Wrong Places" made its radio debut on 15 July on BBC Radio 1 and was released on 8 September. It entered the UK Singles Chart at number 13. "Only Human" was first performed live at a pre-festival warm-up show at the O2 Academy Bristol on 6 June 2013. At festivals during the summer, Gleave also performed the album track "Take Me as I Am". It was premiered at Global Gathering 2013.

Gleave stated that the album would be released on 30 June 2014. He also revealed that the new album will feature no rapping, however Gleave did state on Twitter that a rap verse may have been added to the upcoming single "One More Day (Stay with Me)", as well as four other tracks on the album. He has also stated that he won't appear on any collaborations until the end of the album project. Gleave cites The Prodigy, Faithless, Underworld and The Chemical Brothers as influences for the new album, which will include elements of acid house, hardstyle, big beat and 90s rave. The album's second single, "Kids Again", premiered alongside its remixes in January 2014 and will be released on 16 March. It was produced by Gleave and Fraser T Smith, and co-produced by Critikal.

On 11 March during an interview with Capital FM Example confirmed "One More Day" as the album's third single. Example stated that "One More Day (Stay with Me)" would be closer to some 2014 dance songs such as Gorgon City's "Ready for Your Love" and Clean Bandit's "Rather Be". The song is produced by Alex Smith, Example and Critikal, and it premiered on 19 April on Danny Howard's BBC Radio 1 show. In an interview with UKF, Elliot described the album as "quite dark and tough and twisted" aside from the singles.

In April 2014, Example stated that after the release of the album, he plans to release two more singles.

Example has collaborated with Klaxons' Jamie Reynolds on the track "Innocent Minds" which appears on the deluxe version of the album.

On 7 May, Example tweeted saying that the album has been approved and mastered and that audio previews for the tracks would be available to on iTunes the following week. The audio previews for the standard edition of the album were made available on 23 May. The audio previews for the deluxe edition were made available on 28 May.

Example told a fan on Twitter that "Seen You" would be the fourth single from the album. He later confirmed that "10 Million People" would be the fourth single instead and it will be released on 5 October 2014.

== Releases and tours ==
=== Singles ===
"All the Wrong Places" is the album's lead single. It was produced by Critikal, Steve Hill and Example, and was released on 6 September 2013. The single debuted at number 13 on the UK Singles Chart and at number 4 on the UK Dance charts.

The album's second single "Kids Again" was produced by Fraser T Smith, Critikal and Example. It was released on 16 March 2014 and also peaked at number 13 in the UK charts and number 6 on the UK Dance charts.

The album's third single "One More Day" was produced by Critikal, Alex Smith and Example and was released on 20 June 2014. It entered the UK Singles Chart at number 4, making it Gleave's most successful single since "Say Nothing" (2012).

The album's fourth single "10 Million People" was released on 5 October 2014. A remix by Kove premiered through UKF Drum & Bass on 16 August 2014.

=== Other songs ===
"Only Human" was released for exclusive iTunes download upon pre-order of the album, on 26 March 2014. The opening track, "Next Year" was premiered on 30 June. The album's eighth track and also title track, "Live Life Living" was premiered on 1 July. "Seen You" premiered through Capital on 3 July. A music video for "Take Me as I Am" was released on 7 July 2014 to promote the album release.

In the week before the album's release, Amazon released an album minimix for free.

On 7 July 2014, Example released a video for "Take Me as I Am".

=== Tours ===
On 31 January, Gleave announced a mini-tour, named The Ultimate Weekender, would take place from 13 to 15 March. The tour took places at smaller venues in three different cities across the United Kingdom (London, Manchester and Glasgow), with an after-party to follow each gig, giving a total of six gigs. Tickets for the tour were in limited supply and were obtained through application forms on his official website.

Example went on a 26-date tour, starting on 19 October and finishing on 27 November 2014.

Tour dates
| Date | City | Country | Venue |
United Kingdom
| 18 October 2014 | Stoke | England | Stoke Victoria Hall |
| 19 October 2014 | Grimsby | England | Grimsby Auditorium |
| 21 October 2014 | Newcastle | England | Newcastle O2 Academy |
| 22 October 2014 | Carlisle | England | Carlisle Sands Centre |
| 23 October 2014 | York | England | York Barbican |
| 25 October 2014 | Leeds | England | Leeds O2 Academy |
| 26 October 2014 | Bath | England | Bath Pavilion |
| 27 October 2014 | Bournemouth | England | Bournemouth O2 Academy |
| 29 October 2014 | Newport | Wales | Newport Centre |
| 30 October 2014 | Plymouth | England | Plymouth Pavilion |
| 2 November 2014 | Southend | England | Southend Cliffs Pavilion |
| 3 November 2014 | Margate | England | Margate Winter Gardens |
| 4 November 2014 | Folkestone | England | Folkestone Leas Cliff Hall |
| 6 November 2014 | Eastbourne | England | Eastbourne Winter Gardens |
| 7 November 2014 | Nottingham | England | Nottingham Rock City |
| 8 November 2014 | Sheffield | England | Sheffield O2 Academy |
| 10 November 2014 | Leicester | England | Leicester O2 Academy |
| 11 November 2014 | Portsmouth | England | Portsmouth Guildhall |
| 14 November 2014 | London | England | O2 Academy Brixton |
| 17 November 2014 | Cambridge | England | Cambridge Corn Exchange |
| 18 November 2014 | Norwich | England | Norwich UEA |
| 19 November 2014 | Liverpool | England | Liverpool Guild of Students |
| 21 November 2014 | Birmingham | England | Birmingham O2 Academy |
| 22 November 2014 | Llandudno | Wales | Venue Cymru Arena |
| 23 November 2014 | Hull | England | Hull City Hall |
| 25 November 2014 | Glagow | Scotland | Glasgow Barrowland |
| 27 November 2014 | Manchester | England | Manchester O2 Academy |

Setlist
1. "Stay Awake"
2. "Say Nothing" (Hardwell & Dannic Remix)
3. "Watch the Sun Come Up"
4. "All the Wrong Places"
5. "Perfect Replacement"
6. "Midnight Run" (Flux Pavilion Remix)
7. "Playing in the Shadows"
8. "Close Enemies"
9. "Dirty Face"
10. "Hooligans"
11. "One More Day (Stay with Me)"
12. "10 Million People"
13. "Won't Go Quietly"
14. "Take Me as I Am""
15. "Kids Again"
16. "We'll Be Coming Back"
17. "Kickstarts"
18. "Natural Disaster" (Benny Benassi Remix)
19. "Changed the Way You Kiss Me"

== Critical reception ==
Professional ratings
Review scores
| Source | Rating |
|---|---|
| AllMusic | 3/5 stars |
| The Guardian | 3/5 stars |
| theMusic.com.au | 3/5 stars |
| NME | 5/10 |
| The Observer | 2/5 stars |

Upon release, the album has received mixed reviews from critics.

Praises went to the variety in style and experimentation between each track. Ben Cardew from NME stated: "This fifth album, his first for a major-label, marks another change – whereas before he'd sing and rap over EDM-tinged tracks, here he decides to largely can the rapping that made his name, spitting barely a handful of verses, and delivers a record of relentless club bangers featuring choice '90s dance influences ... This willingness to experiment should be applauded, and it's fun (at first) to play spot the influences."

In terms of criticisms, Cardew stated: "But while the style may vary, the tone rarely does. Bar a moody-ish late-album spell, everything is designed for maximum rave uplift, displaying not so much light and dark, as light, more light and Day-Glo. The lyrics, too, tend towards the ear-rinsingly bland (as showcased on the single 'One More Day (Stay With Me)' "another lesson learned, another page is turned" etc.) as if Example wants to hide behind disco platitudes. And on the few occasions here he does resort to rap, there is a palpable feel of grudging 'will-this-do'? ... there's a sense that Example's fifth album could have been something quite unique. Instead, 'Live Life Living' is as hard to stomach as its tongue twister title is to pronounce." Killian Fox from The Observer stated: "This album, the London rapper-turned-singer's fifth, has moments of self-effacement ("I'm so, so far from perfect, will you take me as I am?"), but in general it lacks conviction or a driving force. The cliches in the lyrics ("Like a rabbit in the headlights") extend to the formulaic production, which pays homage to 90s dance culture without bringing anything very interesting to the party."

== Track listing ==
| No. | Title | Writer(s) | Producer(s) | Length |
|---|---|---|---|---|
| 1. | "Next Year" | Elliot Gleave; Stuart Price | Stuart Price | 5:06 |
| 2. | "Kids Again" | Gleave; Fraser T Smith | Example; Fraser T Smith; Critikal^{[b]} | 3:12 |
| 3. | "One More Day (Stay with Me)" | Gleave; Alex Smith; Sam Preston | Example; Alex Smith; Critikal^{[b]} | 3:27 |
| 4. | "10 Million People" | Gleave; F Smith; Alf Bamford | Example; Fraser T Smith; Critikal | 4:22 |
| 5. | "Only Human" | Gleave; Andy Sheldrake | Sheldrake; Critikal^{[b]} | 3:42 |
| 6. | "Seen You" | Gleave; F Smith; Bamford | Example; Sheldrake; Fraser T Smith; Critikal | 3:45 |
| 7. | "Can't Face the World Alone" | Gleave; F Smith | Example; Fraser T Smith; Critikal^{[b]} | 3:44 |
| 8. | "Live Life Living" | Gleave; Bamford | Example; Critikal | 3:13 |
| 9. | "All the Wrong Places" | Gleave; Bamford; Steve Hill | Example; Critikal; Steve Hill^{[a]} | 3:27 |
| 10. | "Take Me as I Am" | Gleave; Bamford | Example; Critikal | 3:12 |
| 11. | "At Night" | Gleave; Price | Stuart Price | 5:13 |
| 12. | "Longest Goodbye" | Gleave; Price | Stuart Price | 4:46 |
| Total length: | | | | 47:08 |

Deluxe edition bonus tracks
| No. | Title | Writer(s) | Producer(s) | Length |
|---|---|---|---|---|
| 13. | "New Friends" | Gleave; Sheldrake | Sheldrake; Critikal^{[b]} | 3:28 |
| 14. | "Full Eclipse" | Gleave; Bamford | Critikal | 3:55 |
| 15. | "One Last Breath" | Gleave; Jakob Liedholm | Jakob Liedholm; Critikal^{[b]} | 3:14 |
| 16. | "Innocent Minds" | Gleave; Jamie Reynolds; Sheldrake; Bamford | Example; Critikal; Sheldrake | 3:43 |
| Total length: | | | | 60:28 |

Deluxe edition bonus disc
| No. | Title | Length |
|---|---|---|
| 1. | "All the Wrong Places" (Quintino Remix) | 5:25 |
| 2. | "All the Wrong Places" (Calyx & TeeBee Remix) | 4:58 |
| 3. | "All the Wrong Places" (Jack Beats Remix) | 5:33 |
| 4. | "All the Wrong Places" (Starkillers Remix) | 5:11 |
| 5. | "Kids Again" (MOTi Remix) | 4:37 |
| 6. | "Kids Again" (Dimension Remix) | 4:09 |
| 7. | "Kids Again" (Zed Bias Remix) | 4:46 |
| 8. | "Kids Again" (Critikal 'Miami Sunrise' Remix) | 5:12 |
| Total length: | | 60:41 |

iTunes deluxe edition bonus videos
| No. | Title | Director(s) | Length |
|---|---|---|---|
| 25. | "All the Wrong Places" | Emil Nava | 3:27 |
| 26. | "All the Wrong Places" (Quintino Remix) | | 5:25 |
| 27. | "Kids Again" | Jon Jon Augustavo | 3:13 |
| 28. | "Kids Again" (MOTi Remix) | | 4:37 |
| Total length: | | | 77:23 |

Notes

- ^{^a} signifies a co-producer
- ^{^b} signifies an additional producer
- Backing vocals on tracks 1, 2, 5, 6, 7 and 15 by Kai Kai Smith.
- Chant vocals on track 2 by Alf Bamford, Samuel Wire, Andy Sheldrake, John Jenkins and Mark Surridge.
- Backing vocals on track 3 by Alex Smith.
- Vocals on track 16 by Jamie Reynolds.

== Charts ==
| Chart (2014) | Peak position |
|---|---|
| Irish Albums (IRMA) | 28 |
| Scottish Albums (OCC) | 11 |
| UK Albums (OCC) | 8 |
| UK Album Downloads (OCC) | 7 |
| UK Dance Albums (OCC) | 1 |

== Release history ==
| Region | Date | Format | Label |
|---|---|---|---|
| United Kingdom | 7 July 2014 | CD, digital download | Epic/Sony |
| Canada | 8 July 2014 | CD, digital download | Epic/Sony |
| Australia | 11 July 2014 | CD, digital download | Epic/Sony |
| New Zealand | 11 July 2014 | CD, digital download | Epic/Sony |
| United States | 12 August 2014 | CD, digital download | Sony/Ultra Records |
