= Only Human =

Only Human may refer to:

== Film and television ==
- Only Human (2004 film) (Seres queridos), a Spanish-Argentine film
- Only Human (2010 film), an Irish experimental film
- Only Human (TV programme), a British documentary programme
- "Only Human", an episode of The Transformers
- "Only Human", an episode of Teen Titans

== Literature ==
=== Novels ===
- Only Human (novel), a 2005 Doctor Who novel by Gareth Roberts
- Only Human, a novel by Jenny Diski
- Only Human, a novel by Tom Holt
- Only Human, a novel in the Fourth World trilogy by Kate Thompson

=== Short stories ===
- "Only Human" (short story), a 2003 story by Eileen Wilks
- "Only Human", a short story by Cormac Cullinan
- "Only Human", a short story by John Strange Winter

== Music ==
=== Albums ===
- Only Human (Dina Carroll album) (1996)
- Only Human (Cheryl album) (2014)
- Only Human (Crease album) (2004)
- Only Human (Hal Crook album) (1993)
- Only Human (Calum Scott album) (2018)
- Only Human, an album by 12 Stones
- Only Human, an album by Amon Düül II
- Only Human, an album by At Vance
- Only Human, an album by Toploader

=== Songs ===
- "Only Human" (Cheryl song) (2014)
- "Only Human" (Example song) (2014)
- "Only Human" (Delta Goodrem song) (2015)
- "Only Human" (Jonas Brothers song) (2019)
- "Only Human", a song by Jason Mraz from We Sing. We Dance. We Steal Things.
- "Only Human", a song by K from Beyond the Sea

== Other ==
- Only Human (podcast), a podcast by WNYC Studios

== See also ==
- "You're Only Human (Second Wind)", a 1985 song by Billy Joel
