= Bangers & Ballads =

Studio album by Example
- Released: 17 August 2018
- Recorded: 2017–2018
- Genres: UK garage; house; electropop; pop rap
- Length: 32:35
- Label: Staneric Recordings
- Producers: Gleave; Zenn Habits; Bowzer Boss; DJ Katch; Tim Crudu; Jodie Harsh; Braque Music; Rude Kid

Example chronology
Live Life Living (2014)	Bangers & Ballads (2018)	Some Nights Last for Days (2020)

Singles from Bangers & Ballads
- 1. "Back for More" Released: 3 August 2018; 2. "Show Me How to Love" Released: 10 August 2018; 3. "Sit Down Gary !!!" Released: 17 August 2018

Bangers & Ballads is the sixth studio album by English musician Example, released on 17 August 2018 through his own label Staneric Recordings. Originally cited by Gleave as a mixtape, it has been retroactively referred to as his sixth studio album following the release of his subsequent albums.

== Background and development ==
Prior to his 2014 tour, Example had confirmed to a fan on Twitter that work on his sixth album had begun, although he stated that it wouldn't likely be finished before the end of 2015. Example spent studio time with Netsky and Sigma leading up to his 2014 tour who could be possible collaborators for the album. In early 2015, Example released a statement on his Twitter account detailing his plans for the year ahead and the following year. The statement detailed that he would be taking a significant break from touring in 2015 in order to spend time with his then wife and son as well as to write new music for his upcoming album and, in 2016, he planned to release his sixth album and return to touring with a full live band. He also released a brief early demo snippet on Instagram, displaying part of a rap verse.

On 8 June 2015, Example revealed on Twitter that "Whisky Story", the lead single from his sixth studio album, and its music video would be revealed on 8 July. The track was available to download on 10 July, and peaked only at number 96 in the Official UK charts.

In May 2016, Example confirmed that the second single from his untitled sixth album would be "Later" and would be a return to "classic Example", citing "Changed the Way You Kiss Me" as a reference in an interview with Russell Kane on Virgin Radio.

After a two year break to focus on his family, Gleave started going to the studio every day for two weeks, as he felt more inspired by the birth of his second child. He described the album he was writing as "a collection of songs I want to still be performing ten years from now". By January 2018, he had already written over 50 songs for the project and was waiting for his label to allow him to put it out. On 19 January, he released the single "The Answer". He left Columbia after both he and the label felt "frustrated" with the commercial performance of his latest singles. Afterwards, he started his own label, Staneric Recordings, named after his grandfathers.

On 17 June 2018, he revealed the album's title, cover art and song titles on his Instagram and stated that he would be releasing the album the following month or in August. When asked if the album was going to be released on CD, Gleave stated “Probably not. It’s 2018.", citing streaming services to have become the predominant way of listening to music. This makes it the only Example album not to be released on CD.

== Singles ==
- "Back for More", a collaboration with record producer Rude Kid, was released as the first single alongside the album's pre-order opening on 3 August 2018, premiering a day before through Radio 1Xtra's MistaJam's radio show.
- "Show Me How to Love" is the second single from the album. It was released on 10 August 2018 and features vocals from singer-songwriter Hayla.
- "Sit Down Gary !!!" was released on 17 August 2018 as the third and final single from the album.

== Reception ==
Professional ratings
Review scores
Source	Rating
Album of the Year	45/100
AllMusic	2.5/5 stars

The album received mixed reviews from music critics and fans upon release.

== Track listing ==
No.	Title	Writer(s)	Producer(s)	Length
1.	"Sit Down Gary !!!"	Elliot Gleave; Andrew Sheldrake; Zachariah Edwards	Zenn Habits; Bowzer Boss	3:58
2.	"Show Me How to Love" (featuring Hayla)	Gleave; Sheldrake; Christoph Bauss; Hayley Philippa Williams; Jonas Becker; Sam Gray; Timofei Crudu	Gleave; DJ Katch; Tim Crudu	3:36
3.	"All U Need" (featuring Karen Harding)	Gleave; Sheldrake; Harding	Zenn Habits	3:12
4.	"Sick & Twisted"	Gleave; Sheldrake; Bastian Langebaek	Zenn Habits	3:00
5.	"Headlights"	Gleave; Sheldrake; Sarah Aarons	Zenn Habits	3:27
6.	"Into Darkness" (featuring Black Gatsby)	Gleave; Sheldrake; D'Angelo Lacy; Jason Sellards; Jodie Harsh	Gleave; Harsh	3:42
7.	"S1MPL3"	Gleave; Sheldrake; Dan Priddy	Gleave; Braque Music	3:30
8.	"Back for More" (with Rude Kid)	Gleave; Sheldrake; Shehzard Zar	Rude Kid	3:16
9.	"Can't Get Me Down" (featuring ARO VANA)	Gleave; Sheldrake; Kai Smith	Zenn Habits	4:49
Total length:				32:35

Notes

- Track listing and credits from album booklet.

== Personnel ==
- Elliot Gleave – vocals, writing, additional producer
- Andrew Sheldrake - writing
- Zenn Habits - producer, mixing, writing (1, 3, 4, 5, 9)
- Jonas Becker - producer, mixing, writing (2)
- Tim Crudu - producer, mixing, writing (2)
- Jodie Harsh - producer, mixing, writing (6)
- Braque Music - producer, mixing, writing (7)
- Shehzard Zar – producer, mixing, writing (8)
- Bowzer Boss – producer, mixing, writing (1)
- Zachariah Edwards - vocals, writing (1)
- Hayley Philippa Williams - vocals, writing (2)
- Karen Harding - vocals, writing (3)
- Sarah Aarons - vocals, writing (5)
- D'Angelo Lacy - vocals, writing (6)
- Christoph Bauss - writing (2)
- Sam Gray - writing (2)
- Bastian Langebaek - writing (4)
- Jason Sellards - writing (6)
- Dan Priddy - writing (7)
- Kai Smith - writing (9)

== Charts ==
Weekly chart performance for Bangers & Ballads
Chart (2018)	Peak position
UK Album Downloads (Official Charts)	16
UK Dance Albums (Official Charts)	3
UK Independent Albums (Official Charts)	16

== Release history ==
Region	Date	Format	Label
UK	17 August 2018	Digital download	Staneric Recordings
