= One More Day (Stay with Me) =

Single by Example

from the album Live Life Living
- Released: 22 June 2014
- Recorded: 2013–14
- Genre: House
- Length: 3:28
- Label: Epic; Sony
- Songwriters: Elliot Gleave; Sam Preston; Alex Smith
- Producers: Example; Alex Smith; Critikal (additional)

Example singles chronology
"Kids Again" (2014)	"One More Day (Stay with Me)" (2014)	"10 Million People" (2014)

"One More Day (Stay with Me)" is a 2014 song by British recording artist Example. It was released by Epic Records on 22 June 2014 as the third single from his fifth studio album, Live Life Living (2014). The song was written and produced by Example, Alex Smith, Sam Preston and Alf Bamford. The song entered the UK Singles Chart at number four, making it Example's first top 5 single since 2012's "Say Nothing".

== Background and release ==
"One More Day (Stay with Me)" was written by Example, Alex Smith, Preston and Technikal. It was originally going to be titled simply "Stay with Me" but was later changed to "One More Day (Stay with Me)" to avoid confusion with Sam Smith's song of the same name. Example has compared the composition to that of other 2014 UK dance songs such as Gorgon City's "Ready for Your Love" and Clean Bandit's "Rather Be". He said, "I went into the studio with Alex Smith who I made 'Watch the Sun Come Up' with back in 2009. Pianos as club hooks have worked well for me in the past so with this track I wanted to recapture some of that sunshine in my music. For me, 'One More Day' evokes all the great moments of 90s euphoria but I've put a bit of a twist on everything as it's 2014. I've also added a little 8-bar rap for an injection of energy ' some fans on twitter were begging me to rap again after my last few singles were just singing."

In an interview with the Daily Mirror, Example said: "At the start we were trying to write a song from the girl's perspective, maybe Cheryl Cole or someone, but it didn't have the same lyrics as the final version, just that piano riff.," he said. "And then as I started falling in love with the song I decided I wanted it for myself, so we changed the lyrics so it was the guy's point of view, and then I made the song about when I met Erin [his then wife]. We had this amazing romantic night together, 'a night of passion,' but I had to leave Australia and go back to the UK, and I didn't see her for like five weeks. Then I'd see her for a couple of weeks and then not see her for a month. She was in Sydney."

The EP features remixes from M.J. Cole, Shadow Child and Erik Arbores, as well as an extended mix. Example debuted the song on Danny Howard's BBC Radio 1 show on 19 April, with the song being released on 23 June. The Cole remix premiered through UKF.

== Chart performance ==
The song debuted at number four on the UK Singles Chart on 29 June 2014. It also debuted at number two on the UK Dance Chart.

== Music video ==
The music video was directed by Adam Powell and was uploaded to YouTube on 25 May 2014. It has since gathered over 4.8 million views.

== Track listing ==
Digital download - single
No.	Title	Length
1.	"One More Day (Stay with Me)" (Radio Edit)	3:28

Digital download - EP
No.	Title	Length
1.	"One More Day (Stay with Me)" (Extended Mix)	5:03
2.	"One More Day (Stay with Me)" (M.J. Cole Remix)	5:38
3.	"One More Day (Stay with Me)" (Shadow Child Remix)	5:13
4.	"One More Day (Stay with Me)" (Erik Arbores Remix)	5:07
5.	"One More Day (Stay with Me)" (Metro Remix)	6:47

== Charts ==
Chart (2014)	Peak position
Belgium (Ultratip Bubbling Under Flanders)	81
Czech Republic Airplay (ČNS IFPI)	99
Ireland (IRMA)	28
Poland Dance (ZPAV)	7
Scottish Singles Sales (Official Charts)	5
UK Singles (Official Charts)	4
UK Dance (Official Charts)	2

== Release history ==
Region	Date	Format	Label
Ireland	20 June 2014	Digital download	Epic Records
United Kingdom	22 June 2014	Digital download	Epic Records
Australia	27 June 2014	Digital download	Epic Records

== Personnel ==
- Elliot Gleave - vocals, composition, production
- Alex Smith - production
- Alfie "Critikal" Bamford - additional production
