= 10 Million People =

Single by Example

from the album Live Life Living
- Released: 5 October 2014
- Recorded: 2013–14
- Genre: EDM
- Length: 4:22
- Label: Epic; Sony Music
- Songwriter(s): Elliot Gleave; Fraser T Smith; Alf Bamford
- Producer(s): Example; Smith; Critikal (additional)

Example singles chronology
"One More Day (Stay with Me)" (2014)	"10 Million People" (2014)	"Whisky Story" (2015)

"10 Million People" is a 2014 song by British recording artist Example. It was released by Epic Records on 5 October 2014 as the fourth single from his fifth studio album, Live Life Living (2014). The song is written and produced by Example, Fraser T Smith and Alf Bamford.

== Background and release ==
In early June 2014, Example intended to release "Seen You" as the album's fourth single. On 30 June, however, he stated that the fourth single would be "10 Million People". The EP features remixes from Kove, Critikal, Static Revenger, Mike Millrain and Eli & Fur as well as the album version of the song. The Kove remix was uploaded to UKF Music on 16 August.

Example has said that "'10 Million People' was written after watching a documentary on early 90s rave culture. I found this video online where they were interviewing people at an illegal rave. The guy with the microphone said to one of the revellers, 'Surely this whole rave thing is just a fad'. And the raver replied, 'Well 10 million people can't be wrong'." He also stated that the song feels "timeless" to him and is his favorite song on the album.

== Music video ==
The singer confirmed on his Twitter page that the music video was filmed during his performance on the 2014 FIB Festival, hosted in Benicássim on 19 July. He uploaded the video onto his VEVO channel on 27 August 2014.

== Track listing ==
Digital download - single
No.	Title	Length
1.	"10 Million People" (Radio Edit)	3:37

Digital download - EP
No.	Title	Length
1.	"10 Million People" (Extended Mix)	6:03
2.	"10 Million People" (Kove Remix)	4:16
3.	"10 Million People" (Eli & Fur Remix)
4.	"10 Million People" (Static Revenger Remix)	5:58
5.	"10 Million People" (Mike Millrain Remix)
6.	"10 Million People" (Critikal Remix)

== Release history ==
Region	Date	Format	Label
Ireland	3 October 2014	Digital download	Epic Records
United Kingdom	5 October 2014	Digital download	Epic Records

== Personnel ==
- Elliot Gleave - vocals, composition, production
- Fraser T Smith - production
- Alfie "Critikal" Bamford - additional production
