= Crease (band) =

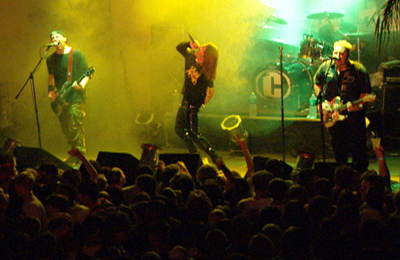
- Crease live, from their "Vindication" release party in 2000

Background information
- Origin: Ft. Lauderdale, Florida, United States
- Genres: Hard rock, alternative rock
- Years active: 1994–2006; 2010-present
- Labels: DM Records, Whateverman Records, Roadrunner Records
- Members: Kelly Meister; Fritz Dorigo; Greg Gershengorn; Eric Dorigo
- Website: Instagram

Crease is an American hard rock band that formed in Ft. Lauderdale, Florida in 1994.

Three quarters of the band (Kelly Meister and brothers Fritz & Eric Dorigo) originally came from the Alt-Thrash band XSF (Excessive), which formed late in 1985. When their bass player quit the band to get married, friend of the band, Greg Gershengorn was brought in to replace him. Once a few shows that were previously booked as Excessive were completed, the band changed their name to Crease and started writing all new material. The band recorded a full-length studio album, Interference, on a local indie label in 1995. But it wasn't until the self-financed/self released album ...Six Pack Shy Of Pretty was released in 1998, that the group found success. Their major label release, Vindication and Indie release Only Human, would follow.

== History ==
=== Early years (1994) ===
Crease was an outgrowth of a previous band, XSF (Excessive), formed in 1985 by four high school friends: singer Kelly Meister, guitarist Fritz Dorigo, drummer Eric Dorigo and bassist Vinny Pereira. The latter was replaced Greg Gershengorn in 1994. With new songwriting blood in the mix, it was agreed that the foursome would wipe their slate clean by writing all new material and changing the name of the band. With a new identity and sound, the band played relentlessly throughout the South Florida music scene in 1994. During this time, the group entered the studio to record a 6-song demo (Spiritual Bliss, Curiosity, Bored, I Don't Think So, Manhole & Face) with local producer Gary Stryder. These recordings would eventually lead to the band getting noticed by a local Independent label.

=== Interference (1995) ===
One year after forming, the band secured a record deal with indie label DM Records in 1995. Crease entered the studio to record their first full-length studio album, Interference. Trouble began almost immediately as the band was extremely unhappy with the records final mix. Lack of promotion and distribution led to poor sales. However, the album did garner the band a Jammy Award nomination from JAM magazine for “Best Independent Release of the Year for the State for Florida”. A year later, the contract between Crease and DM Records was over and the band was back to square one.

=== 1996–1998 ===
During the next three years, the group would write over 60 songs and wound up recording three albums worth of material. These albums (Stuck Like Chuck, Tastes Like A Penny & Lost In The Process) were never released to the public, but did contain some of the material that would later be included on ...Six Pack Shy Of Pretty & Vindication. The group became a fixture on the South Florida scene and would open for such heavyweights as Quiet Riot & Vince Neil. It was during this time that the group, through a mutual friend, met legendary band manager Bill Aucoin of Kiss and Billy Idol fame. Aucoin liked the band enough to help set up a label showcase. The labels would all pass, but Crease was introduced to music producer Paul Trust that evening. Trust was taken with the band and expressed interest in working with them.

=== …Six Pack Shy Of Pretty (1998–1999) ===
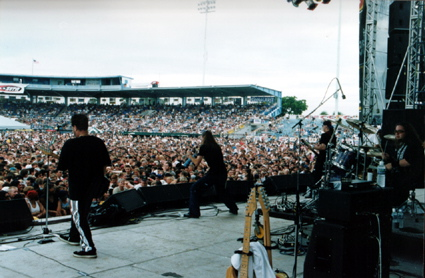
Crease at Zetafest 1999

Crease entered the “Dungeon” recording studios in North Miami with Trust in hopes of recording a full-length album to shop with. However, five tracks in, the band was almost out of money. As luck would have it, “Frustration” was one of the tracks recorded. The band released ...Six Pack Shy Of Pretty. The band printed 500 copies of the EP and to save money, the CD was shipped in pieces to be assembled by the group. The EP was given to a DJ (Kimba), at the rock radio station in town, 94.9 Zeta (WZTA). Kimba picked the anthemic “Frustration” to play on “Zeta Goes Local”. Program Director Greg Steele of 94.9 Zeta, happened to be listening. Steele called the band and told them that “Frustration” has the sound that he envisioned for Zeta and wanted to put the song into a regular rotation to see what would happen. A week later, 94.9 Zeta asked the band to open for Dishwalla in front of 8,000 people. “Frustration” went to a heavy rotation and hit No. 1. Over 7,000 copies of ...Six Pack Shy Of Pretty would be sold. Crease signed with New York-based manager, Jamie Schoenfeld, and began shopping for a deal. Industry magazine, “Hits”, named Crease the “Hottest Unsigned Band in the Country” during the summer of 1999. During this time, other radio stations in Florida would add “Frustration” to their playlists and 94.9 Zeta would release Crease's cover version of “Jenny 867-5309” as the band's second single. Crease was added to the “Zetafest” bill, four slots away from headlining the show and proved that they had what it took to entertain a crowd of 35,000 Floridians. Crease outsold Kid Rock & Metallica, who had new CDs released at that time, in the Miami market for the next 2 weeks. Crease spent the rest of the year playing a slew of showcases up and down the East Coast as well as opening for Godsmack, The Goo Goo Dolls, Our Lady Peace, Finger Eleven & Def Leppard. The New Times of Broward/Palm Beach voted Crease “Best Local Rock Band of 1999”. Smelling success, DM Records resurfaced with claims that they still owned the band. The group decided to take legal action against DM Records and wound up settling, instead of letting the matter get drawn out in court. With DM out of the way once and for all, Crease signed with Roadrunner Records in December 1999.

=== Vindication (2000–2001) ===
Crease entered Elysian Fields recording studio in Boca Raton, Florida, in January 2000. The band tracked 7 new songs (Gravity, Just For A Second, I'm The One, Spin Around, Butterfly Stitches, Stuck Like Chuck & Watch What You Wish For) and included revamped & remixed versions of the 5 songs from ...Six Pack Shy Of Pretty, on what would become Vindication. The record was finished at Audio Vision recording studios in Miami, Florida in March 2000. “Frustration” was released to radio in June 2000 and was the 8th most added song across the country for its first week out. "Frustration" was featured in the film, "Thank You, Good Night". Jenny 867-5309 was featured in an episode of TV's "Roswell" and the video game "ESPN X-Games Skateboarding". "Building Up" was used by HBO in their documentary, "Middle School Confessions". By October 2000, the president and their A&R person were gone from the label. All of the bands these two signed were dropped the same day. Crease was one of those bands. The group was now without a label and did not own the rights to Vindication. Without losing any momentum, the band headed back to the studio to record 5 new songs. After a few showcases, any label interest waned after the September 11 attacks.

=== Only Human (2001–2006) ===
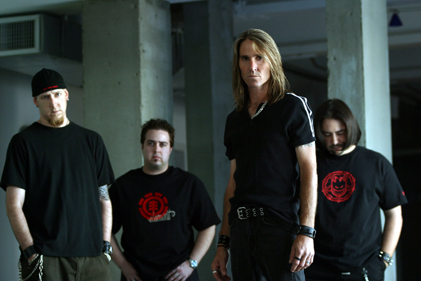
Crease in 2004

The band enlisted the help of Grammy-winning producer/mixer Charles Dye to helm their next studio record. Dye, who was writing a column on Digidesign's (Pro Tools) website, Hard Disc Life at the time, asked the band to do something that had never been done before. Dye & Crease made available all of the tracks from one of the songs (Live To Be In Love), to give Pro-Tools enthusiasts an opportunity to practice and hone their mixing skills. Through Dye's column, users would be given a rare opportunity to download and work with high-end material and high-end recordings, at no cost to the users, and learn to mix through Dye's groundbreaking teachings. The column was a huge success. In 2004, Only Human was complete and released on Crease's own label, Whateverman Records. "Nothing Is Real" was released as the first single. Unable to repeat the success of ...Six Pack Shy Of Pretty & Vindication, Crease disbanded in 2006. Guitarist Fritz Dorigo and bassist Greg Gershengorn went on to form the punk/rock group, Dirty DNA.

=== Leftovers (2010–2011) ===
It was announced in January 2011 on their MySpace page that Crease is currently working on a new CD. The band went back into the studio to record the remaining songs they had left over from Only Human and a few new ones, as well as very old material that was never recorded. The record is entitled, “Leftovers”.

== Discography ==
=== Studio albums ===
- Interference (1995)
- ...Six Pack Shy Of Pretty (1998)
- Vindication (2000)
- Only Human (2004)
- Leftovers (2011)

== Band members ==
- Kelly Meister – lead vocals
- Fritz Dorigo – guitars, vocals
- Greg Gershengorn – bass, vocals
- Eric Dorigo – drums, percussion
