= Only Human (Example song) =

Song by Example

from the album Live Life Living
- Released: 26 March 2014
- Recorded: 2013
- Genre: Electronic; electro house; alternative dance
- Length: 3:44
- Label: Epic; Sony Music Entertainment UK
- Songwriter(s): Elliot Gleave; Andy Sheldrake; Alf Bamford
- Producer(s): Example; Sheldrake; Critikal (co-producer)

"Only Human" is a song by British singer Example. It was released on 26 March 2014 through Epic Records as an instant download when pre-ordering his fifth studio album Live Life Living. The song is written and produced by Example, Sheldrake and Alf Bamford.

== Background and release ==
"Only Human" was first performed live at a pre-festival warm-up show at the O2 Academy Bristol on 6 June 2013.

On March 26, Example released the song as a promotional single.

== Track listing ==
Album version
No.	Title	Length
1.	"Only Human"	3:44

== Personnel ==
- Elliot Gleave - vocals, production
- Andy Sheldrake - co-production, guitars
- Alfie Bamford (Technikal) - additional production, programming
