= Hits (Example album) =

#Hits

Greatest hits album by Example
- Released: 5 August 2013
- Recorded: 2009–2012
- Genre: British hip hop, dance-pop
- Length: 1:08:30
- Label: Ministry of Sound

Example chronology
The Evolution of Man (2012)	#Hits (2013)	Live Life Living (2014)

Professional ratings
Review scores
Source	Rating
AllMusic	4/5 stars

#Hits is a greatest hits album consisting of songs by the British recording artist Example. It was released on 5 August 2013. It is Example's final release with Ministry of Sound, as he had signed a new record deal with Epic Records. According to Example he has received negative feedback regarding the decision to release a compilation album. He released a statement on his official Instagram profile saying the release was decided by Ministry of Sound and "totally beyond my control". It debuted at number 11 on the UK Albums Chart.

== Track listing ==
No.	Title	Original album	Length
1.	"Changed the Way You Kiss Me"	Playing in the Shadows	3:13
2.	"Kickstarts"	Won't Go Quietly	3:02
3.	"We'll Be Coming Back" (Calvin Harris featuring Example)	18 Months / The Evolution of Man	3:57
4.	"Stay Awake"	Playing in the Shadows	3:25
5.	"Won't Go Quietly"	Won't Go Quietly	3:39
6.	"Say Nothing"	The Evolution of Man	3:41
7.	"Watch the Sun Come Up"	Won't Go Quietly	3:24
8.	"Natural Disaster" (Laidback Luke vs. Example)	Playing in the Shadows	5:06
9.	"Midnight Run"	Playing in the Shadows	4:00
10.	"Playing in the Shadows"	Playing in the Shadows	4:39
11.	"Last Ones Standing"	Won't Go Quietly	3:25
12.	"Hooligans (VIP Mix)" (with Don Diablo)	Won't Go Quietly	3:37
13.	"Watch the Sun Come Up (Moám Remix)"	Watch the Sun Come Up EP	7:16
14.	"Close Enemies (Jakob Liedholm Remix)"	Close Enemies EP	5:40
15.	"Say Nothing (Hardwell & Dannic Remix)"	Say Nothing EP	6:12
16.	"Unorthodox" (Wretch 32 featuring Example)	Black and White	3:03

== Charts ==
Chart (2013)	Peak position
Irish Albums (IRMA)	74
Scottish Albums (OCC)	12
UK Albums (OCC)	11
UK Dance Albums (OCC)	8
UK Independent Albums (OCC)	2

== Certifications ==
Region	Certification	Certified units/sales
United Kingdom (BPI)	Gold	100,000^{‡}
^{‡} Sales+streaming figures based on certification alone.
