= All the Wrong Places (song) =

Single by Example

from the album Live Life Living
- Released: 6 September 2013
- Recorded: 2013
- Genre: Eurodance
- Length: 3:27
- Label: Epic; Sony Music
- Songwriter(s): Elliot Gleave; Alf Bamford; Steve Hill
- Producer(s): Critikal; Example (co-producer); Steve Hill (co-producer)

Example singles chronology
"Perfect Replacement" (2013)	"All the Wrong Places" (2013)	"Thursday" (2013)

Alternative cover
- Alternative cover

Alternative cover 2
- Original cover, used on the promotional CD and previously used on iTunes

"All the Wrong Places" is a song by British recording artist Example. It was released as the first single from his fifth studio album, Live Life Living, on 8 September 2013 in the United Kingdom by Epic Records. The song is written by Example, Alf Bamford, and Steve Hill, and it was produced by Example and Bamford under his new stage name Critikal. It entered the UK Singles Chart on 15 September 2013 at No. 13.

== Background and release ==
"All the Wrong Places" received its live debut on 24 April 2013 at an Auckland concert in New Zealand. Example announced via Twitter that tracks off of his upcoming album "All the Wrong Places" and "Only Human" will be played at all festival gigs in the summer. "All the Wrong Places" made its radio debut on 15 July on BBC Radio 1 with Zane Lowe. The EP will feature remixes from Jack Beats, Calyx & TeeBee, Starkillers and Quintino as well as an extended mix. This is the first track Example is releasing since leaving Ministry of Sound and signing to Epic Records, an imprint label of Sony Music Entertainment UK. On 22 July, the Quintino, Jack Beats and Starkillers remixes were uploaded to the Example's YouTube channel while the Calyx & TeeBee remix was uploaded onto UKF Music's channel UKFDrumandBass. The song features during the credits of the film Alan Partridge: Alpha Papa. A variation in production by the original producers Steve Hill and Technikal features on the remix package. The official single cover was designed by UK based artist Charlotte Audrey Owen-Meehan.

== Music video ==
Example uploaded the official lyric video to his VEVO channel on 22 July. The lyric video has gathered over 700,000 views since its release. Example filmed the music video on 24 July with several of his fans raving to the music. He uploaded it to his VEVO channel on 15 August 2013 and it has since gathered over 2,700,000 views. The video for the Quintino remix has gathered over 720,000 views.

== Track listing ==
Digital download
No.	Title	Length
1.	"All the Wrong Places" (Radio Edit)	3:29
2.	"All the Wrong Places" (Extended Mix)	5:07
3.	"All the Wrong Places" (Jack Beats Remix)	5:33
4.	"All the Wrong Places" (Quintino Remix)	5:25

All the Wrong Places (The Remixes)
No.	Title	Length
1.	"All the Wrong Places" (Starkillers Remix)	5:11
2.	"All the Wrong Places" (Calyx & TeeBee Remix)	4:58
3.	"All the Wrong Places" (Steve Hill vs. Technikal Remix)	5:59

== Chart performance ==
Chart (2013)	Peak position
Czech Republic (Rádio – Top 100)	84
Ireland (IRMA)	71
Scotland (OCC)	11
UK Dance (OCC)	4
UK Singles (OCC)	13

== Release history ==
Region	Date	Format	Label
Ireland, rest of Europe	6 September 2013	Digital download	Epic Records
United Kingdom	8 September 2013	Digital download	Epic Records

== Personnel ==
- Elliot Gleave – vocals, composition, co-production
- Alfie "Technikal" Bamford – production, keyboards, programming
- Stephen Hill – co-production
- Wez Clarke – mixing, mastering
