= Six Pack Shy of Pretty =

...Six Pack Shy Of Pretty

Studio album by Crease
- Released: 1998
- Recorded: 1998
- Genre: Rock
- Label: Whateverman Records
- Producer: Paul Trust

Crease chronology
Interference (1995)	...Six Pack Shy Of Pretty (1998)	Vindication (2000)

...Six Pack Shy Of Pretty is the second album released by the Florida-based hard rock music group, Crease. This album was released in 1998, via Whateverman Records.

== Track listing ==
1. "Building Up" – 3:36
2. "Jenny 867-5309" – 3:14
3. "Frustration" – 4:32
4. "Making Progress" – 3:28
5. "Non-User" – 2:41

== Personnel ==
Crease:

- Kelly Meister - lead vocals
- Fritz Dorigo - guitars, vocals
- Greg Gershengorn - bass, vocals
- Eric Dorigo - drums, percussion

=== Production ===
- Paul Trust – producer, mixer, engineer
- Crease - producer
