= Kids Again (Example song) =

Single by Example

from the album Live Life Living
- Released: 14 March 2014
- Recorded: 2013
- Genre: EDM; electronic
- Length: 3:13
- Label: Epic; Sony Music
- Songwriter(s): Elliot Gleave; Alf Bamford; Fraser T Smith
- Producer(s): Smith; Example; Critikal (co-producer)

Example singles chronology
"Thursday" (2013)	"Kids Again" (2014)	"One More Day (Stay with Me)" (2014)

"Kids Again" is a 2014 song by British recording artist Example. It was released as the second single from his fifth studio album, Live Life Living, on 16 March 2014 in the United Kingdom by Epic Records. The song is written and produced by Example, Alf Bamford, and Fraser T Smith.

== Background and release ==
The EP will feature remixes from MOTi, Zed Bias, Dimension and Critikal as well as an extended mix. On 20 January the Zed Bias, MOTi and Critikal remixes were uploaded to Example's YouTube channel.

== Critical reception ==
Lewis Corner of Digital Spy gave the song a mixed-to-positive review stating:

"While our idea of reclaiming our youth involves Sabrina The Teenage Witch marathons, Example is feeling rather more adventurous. "We'll see wherever we wanna see/ Run away from home, they'll never reach us," he declares, leading his missus on an adrenaline-fuelled jaunt across the globe, soundtracked by his trademark mix of stomping club beats and Ibiza-ready synths. Yes, Example is re-treading previous territory with his brand of lad EDM, but it's hard not to be charmed by his new perkier outlook on life."

== Music video ==
Example uploaded the music video to his VEVO channel on 12 February. Example filmed the music video on location in Miami at the beginning of February with several of his fans raving to the music. The video was directed by Jon Jon Augustavo. It has since gathered over 2,800,000 views. On 3 March, the video for the MOTi remix was uploaded to Example's VEVO Channel. The video for the MOTi remix has gathered over 220,000 views.

== Track listing ==
Digital download - single
No.	Title	Length
1.	"Kids Again" (Radio Edit)	3:13

Digital download - EP
No.	Title	Length
1.	"Kids Again" (Extended Mix)	5:49
2.	"Kids Again" (MOTi Remix)	4:37
3.	"Kids Again" (Zed Bias Remix)	4:46
4.	"Kids Again" (Dimension Remix)	4:09
5.	"Kids Again" (Critikal 'Ibiza Sunset' Remix)	5:01
6.	"Kids Again" (Critikal 'Miami Sunrise' Remix)	5:12

== Chart performance ==
Chart (2014)	Peak position
Australia (ARIA)	74
Ireland (IRMA)	52
Scotland (OCC)	10
UK Dance (OCC)	6
UK Singles (OCC)	13

== Release history ==
Region	Date	Format	Label
Ireland	14 March 2014	Digital download	Epic Records
United Kingdom	16 March 2014	Digital download	Epic Records

== Personnel ==
- Elliot Gleave - vocals, composition, production
- Fraser T Smith - production
- Alfie "Critikal" Bamford - co-production
