= Interference (Crease album) =

Studio album by Crease
- Released: 1995
- Recorded: 1995
- Genre: Rock
- Label: DM Records

Crease chronology
Interference (1995)	Six Pack Shy Of Pretty (1998)

Interference is the first album released by the Florida-based hard rock music group, Crease. This album was released in 1995, via DM Records. Interference earned Crease a Jammy Award nomination from JAM magazine for “Best Independent Release of the Year for the State for Florida”

== Track listing ==
1. "Curiosity" – 2:11
2. "I Shouldn't Think This Way" – 2:55
3. "Bored" – 3:10
4. "I Don't Think So" – 2:46
5. "In This Life" – 2:30
6. "Manhole" – 2:27
7. "Determined" – 2:59
8. "Spiritual Bliss" – 2:37
9. "Face" – 3:04
10. "Blue Skies" – 2:33
11. "Red" – 2:46
12. "It Doesn't Matter" – 3:05

== Personnel ==
Crease:

- Kelly Meister - lead vocals
- Fritz Dorigo - guitars, vocals
- Greg Gershengorn - bass, vocals
- Eric Dorigo - drums, percussion
