= Vindication (Crease album) =

Studio album by Crease
- Released: 2000
- Recorded: 2000
- Genre: Rock
- Label: Roadrunner
- Producer: Paul Trust

Crease chronology
Six Pack Shy Of Pretty (1998)	Vindication (2000)	Only Human (2004)

Vindication is the third album released by the Florida-based hard rock music group Crease. The album was released in 2000, via Roadrunner Records. "Frustration" was featured in the film "Thank You, Good Night"."Jenny 867-5309" was featured in an episode of TV's "Roswell" and the video game "ESPN X-Games Skateboarding". "Building Up" was used by HBO in their documentary "Middle School Confessions".

== Track listing ==
1. "Vindication" – :30
2. "Gravity" – 2:53
3. "Frustration" – 4:32
4. "Just for a Second" – 4:07
5. "I'm the One" – 2:57
6. "Spin Around" – 3:33
7. "Jenny 867-5309" – 3:14
8. "Making Progress" – 3:28
9. "Butterfly Stitches" – 3:44
10. "Building Up" – 3:36
11. "Non-User" – 2:41
12. "Stuck Like Chuck" – 2:28
13. "Watch What You Wish For" – 13:11

== Personnel ==
Crease:

- Kelly Meister – lead vocals
- Fritz Dorigo – guitars, vocals
- Greg Gershengorn – bass, vocals
- Eric Dorigo – drums, percussion

Addition Personal:

- Chris Crane – keyboards, programming

=== Production ===
- Paul Trust – producer, mixer, engineer
- Crease – producer
- Robert Succio – engineer
- Keith Rose – engineer
