= We Didn't Invent the Remix =

Remix album by Example
- Released: 2006
- Recorded: 2006
- Genre: Hip hop
- Label: All the Chats (U.K.)
- Producer: Rusher

Example chronology
We Didn't Invent the Remix (2006)	What We Made (2007)

We Didn't Invent the Remix is a remix album by London-born recording artist Example. After many setbacks and promises, Example released a 13-track limited-edition mixtape available through the Internet or at concerts during his spring 2007 tour supporting Plan B, The Rifles, and Just Jack). Underneath the track listing there is an advert for What We Made which is said to come out June 2007. Like this mixtape, it was set back for some time, eventually being released in September due to legal issues.

We Didn't Invent the Remix (a reference to the P. Diddy album We Invented the Remix) features 11 tracks sampling a variety of notable artists, including Britney Spears, The Rolling Stones, the most publicity coming from his Lily Allen parody that received some airplay. While the tracks aren't straight covers of the original songs, they do use the themes of the songs, or perhaps a few lines from the chorus, as their subject matter. There are also two bonus tracks, which are original compositions by Example and Rusher, that had previously been featured as B-sides on the vinyl release of his singles "What We Made" and "You Can't Rap"; his first single, the original release for "I Don't Want To", featured track 2, "Loneliness Costs", as its B-side.

We Didn't Invent the Remix was followed by two other mixtapes: What We Almost Made and Credit Munch.

== Track listing ==
No.	Title	Based on	Length
1.	"Eyeballs Painted Black"	"Paint It Black" by the Rolling Stones
2.	"Loneliness Costs"	"One" by Harry Nilsson
3.	"One Night"	"Heartbeats" by José González (originally The Knife)
4.	"Dead Famous"	"When You Wasn't Famous" by the Streets
5.	"Vile"	"Smile" by Lily Allen
6.	"Diamond Day"	"Diamond Day" by Vashti Bunyan
7.	"Toxic Breath"	"Toxic" by Britney Spears
8.	"Get Off"	"Gett Off" by Prince
9.	"I Need A Fast Car"	"Fast Car" by Tracy Chapman
10.	"Bikini Woman" (featuring Brenda Russell)
11.	"Alone With A TV"	"Alone With The TV" by the Mitchell Brothers
12.	"The Sell-Out" (bonus track)	Original song
13.	"Yes Please!" (bonus track)	Original song

Notes

- All the original artists are credited as featured artists.
