= Only Human (Crease album) =

Studio album by Crease
- Released: 2004
- Recorded: 2002–2004
- Genre: Rock
- Label: Whateverman Records
- Producer: Charles Dye

Crease chronology
Vindication (2000)	Only Human (2004)	?

Only Human is the fourth album released by the Florida-based hard rock music group, Crease. This album was released in 2004, via Whateverman Records.

== Track listing ==
1. "Nothing Is Real" – 3:28
2. "Live to Be in Love" – 4:59
3. "Wrapped Around You" – 4:29
4. "Transparent" – 3:51
5. "Indifferent" – 4:15
6. "Whipped" – 3:52
7. "Ordinary" – 3:50
8. "Obviously" – 3:11
9. "Just Like Me" – 3:35
10. "Weight of the World" – 2:57
11. "Make Me Believe" – 3:54
12. "Too Late for Love" – 4:41

== Personnel ==
Crease:

- Kelly Meister - lead vocals
- Fritz Dorigo - guitars, vocals
- Greg Gershengorn - bass, vocals
- Eric Dorigo - drums, percussion

Addition Personal:

- Greg Wiktorski - keyboards, programming
- Chris Crane - keyboards, programming
- Paul Pettitt - keyboards

=== Production ===
- Charles Dye – producer, mixer, engineer
- Greg Gershengorn - producer, engineer
- Richard Serotta - engineer
- Crease - producer
- Paul Trust - producer, engineer
