= What We Almost Made =

Mixtape by Example
- Released: 2008
- Recorded: 2006–2008
- Genre: British hip hop; electronic
- Label: Data
- Producer: Rusher

Example chronology
| What We Made (2007) | What We Almost Made (2008) | Won't Go Quietly (2010) |

What We Almost Made is a 2008 mixtape by London-born entertainer Example. Similar to his previous full-length releases We Didn't Invent the Remix and What We Made, all of the songs in What We Almost Made were mainly written by Example and produced by Rusher. As the title suggests, What We Almost Made was made as a follow-up to What We Made and contains unreleased tracks that weren't included in any of his previous releases (five of which feature various artists); three of the songs, although, were originally B-sides taken from the vinyl releases of the singles "I Don't Want To", "So Many Roads" and "Me & Mandy" (tracks 15, 5 and 6, respectively).

== Track listing ==
1. "Pedigree"
2. "Teenage Kicks" (featuring Ali Love)
3. "Follow Him" (featuring Scroobius Pip)
4. "Loud!" (featuring Frisco & Tinchy Stryder)
5. "Take What I Want"
6. "Mr. Invisible"
7. "Oh Marie"
8. "High As A Kite"
9. "Concrete"
10. "Nicest Thing"
11. "Hush Hush"
12. "Heavy Showers" (featuring Trip)
13. "Bob, Jimi & Kurt"
14. "Nip/Tuck" (featuring Goldielocks)
15. "Who Needs Sunshine?"
16. "Dirty Face" (Bootleg)
