= What We Made =

Studio album by Example
- Released: 17 September 2007
- Recorded: 1998–06
- Genre: British hip hop; grime; rap rock
- Length: 49:36
- Label: The Beats; Warner
- Producer: Rusher; Mike Skinner

Example chronology
We Didn't Invent The Remix (2006)	What We Made (2007)	What We Almost Made (2008)

Singles from What We Made
- 1. "What We Made" / "The Sell-Out" Released: 8 November 2006; 2. "You Can't Rap" / "Yes Please!" Released: 18 June 2007; 3. "I Don't Want To" / "Who Needs Sunshine?" Released: 22 June 2007; 4. "So Many Roads" / "Take What I Want" Released: 3 September 2007; 5. "Me & Mandy" / "Mr. Invisible" Released: 2008

What We Made is the debut studio album released by British recording artist Example. The album was initially due for release in June 2007, as stated on the back of the We Didn't Invent the Remix sleeve, however the album was delayed and was finally released on 17 September 2007. What We Made was later followed by the What We Almost Made mixtape.

It includes the singles "What We Made", "You Can't Rap", "I Don't Want To" and "So Many Roads" (a track previewed on his MySpace and live), all of which were released in the previous year. The track "Me & Mandy" also became a single. Though "I Don't Want To", "Birthday Card", "Today I Met Myself" and "So Many Roads" feature samples of old songs, Example stated in a Metro interview that he does not want to be seen as a rapper who merely covers songs and thus will try to distance himself from simply doing covers and remixes after the success of his mixtape. The album is written and performed entirely by Example and Rusher though many tracks feature additional backing vocals. The track "Milk Your Goat", about spiking girls alcoholic drinks with diamond rings, features the vocals of James Smith lead singer of Hadouken! (but credited under the name Jixilix), "Me & Mandy" features the vocals of Darren Gallagher from indie band The Natives, whom Example met whilst on tour supporting The Rifles. "Posh Birds" features vocals from Tomi Adeosun, a schoolfriend of Example's from his days at ADT College.

The track "No Sleep for the Wicked" heavily samples "Confide in Me" by Kylie Minogue.

The B-sides of the album's singles can be found on the We Didn't Invent The Remix mixtape ("The Sell-Out" and "Yes Please!") and the What We Almost Made mixtape ("Who Needs Sunshine?", "Take What I Want" and "Mr. Invisible").

== Track listing ==
All lyrics are written by Example.

No.	Title	Length
1.	"So Many Roads"	3:34
2.	"You Can't Rap"	3:15
3.	"Milk Your Goat"	4:22
4.	"Birthday Card"	4:42
5.	"I Don't Want To"	3:50
6.	"Popcorn and Fisticuffs"	3:51
7.	"Posh Birds"	3:50
8.	"No Sleep for the Wicked"	3:46
9.	"Me & Mandy"	3:27
10.	"Really Sorry"	4:20
11.	"Today I Met Myself"	3:19
12.	"Care 4 U"	3:28
13.	"What We Made"	3:58
Total length:		49:36

iTunes bonus track
No.	Title	Length
14.	"Already Told You"	2:18
Total length:		51:54
