= All Night (Example song) =

Single by Example
- Released: 11 January 2019
- Recorded: 2018
- Genre: Tech house
- Length: 2:31
- Label: Staneric Recordings
- Songwriters: Elliot Gleave; Erin McNaught
- Producer: Example

Example singles chronology
"Drops" (2018)	"All Night" (2019)	"Money" (2019)

"All Night" is a song by British recording artist Example featuring uncredited vocals by his wife Erin McNaught. It was released as a single on 11 January 2019. The song was written and produced by Example.

== Background ==
After the birth of his second son in September 2017, starting up his own music label Staneric Recordings and releasing his 9-track mixtape "Bangers & Ballads" in August 2018, Example was motivated to record new music. He stated on his social media accounts that he would release a new song every month of 2019, starting with "All Night" in January. Musically, the song is similar in sound to one of his previous singles, "Later".

"All Night" marked Example's first appearance on the UK Singles Chart since his 2015 single "Whisky Story", peaking at #87. Upon the single's release, Spotify included it in multiple dance playlists.

== Music video ==
The music video, directed by Example and Erin McNaught, was premiered on YouTube a few hours before the single's release, on 10 January 2019. It has since reached over 38 million views. The video features Example and McNaught dancing in a dimly lit room at night while Example sings. He has stated that the video was shot while both of their sons were asleep.

== Track listing ==
Digital download
No.	Title	Length
1.	"All Night" (Radio Edit)	2:31
2.	"All Night" (Dots Per Inch remix)	5:13
3.	"All Night" (Jamie Roy's All Night Long remix)	4:24
4.	"All Night" (Jamie Roy's Up All Night remix)	5:52
5.	"All Night" (Jay Robinson remix)	4:17
6.	"All Night" (Sam Bird remix)	2:21
7.	"All Night" (Shapes remix)	4:43
8.	"All Night" (Killer Hertz remix)	4:42
9.	"All Night" (Extended club version)	3:33

== Charts ==
Chart (2019)	Peak position
Belgium (Ultratip Bubbling Under Flanders)	15
Scotland Singles (Official Charts)	69
UK Singles (Official Charts)	87
UK Dance (Official Charts)	26

== Release history ==
Region	Date	Format	Version	Label
Various	11 January 2019	Digital download	Original	Staneric
Various	10 May 2019	Digital download	Remix package	Staneric
