= The Evolution of Man =

Studio album by Example
- Released: 19 November 2012
- Recorded: 2012
- Genres: Hip hop; dance-rap; rock; pop
- Length: 54:21
- Label: Ministry of Sound
- Producers: Alesso; Benga; Dirty South; Feed Me; Friction; Calvin Harris; Zane Lowe; Moám; Sheldrake; Skream; Alex Smith; Tommy Trash

Example chronology
Playing in the Shadows (2011)	The Evolution of Man (2012)	#Hits (2013)

Singles from The Evolution of Man
- 1. "Say Nothing" Released: 16 September 2012; 2. "Close Enemies" Released: 11 November 2012; 3. "Perfect Replacement" Released: 24 February 2013

The Evolution of Man is the fourth studio album by English musician Example, released on 19 November 2012 through Ministry of Sound.

== Background and development ==
Example tweeted that on the plane to Sydney, he planned on writing some songs for a new album and he would be listening to Kasabian's album Velociraptor! for lyrical inspiration. Whilst in Australia for 2 months, the singer planned to write the entire album in the time he spent there.

On 25 July 2012 Example announced via Twitter that the name of the lead single from his fourth album was "Say Nothing" – produced by Dirty South, also revealing it would premiere Monday 30 July 2012 on Capital FM. The track, alongside "Perfect Replacement" (produced by Feed Me), received its live debut on 18–19 August 2012 at the V Festival.

After fans' complaints about the lack of dubstep influence in "Say Nothing", Example responded to a comment on Facebook, saying "wait for the album, I'm not gonna fill the album with the same sounding song, and I'm not gonna keep releasing the same 'dubstep' or 'electro' record".

The promotional video for "Come Taste the Rainbow" premiered on 19 October 2012 on Hunger TV. This was also uploaded later to Example's official YouTube channel.

"Close Enemies", produced by Alex Smith, was released as the second single from the album on 11 November 2012, entering the UK Singles Chart at No. 37.

On 15 November, Greg James at BBC Radio 1 had the exclusive first play of "Perfect Replacement", with Example claiming that he "wanted it to be a single" but that there were "five or six" tracks that could be chosen as the third single. On 24 November, Example confirmed "Perfect Replacement" as the third single. Previous tweets had hinted towards "Queen of Your Dreams" becoming a future single. During a live hangout on Google+, he revealed that he struggles to reach the high notes and so he doesn't perform "Queen of Your Dreams" live.

From 11 February to 1 March 2013, Example and his live band completed their second UK arena tour. He performed six tracks from The Evolution of Man along with songs from his previous two albums Playing in the Shadows and Won't Go Quietly. The band consists of Gleave, Sheldrake, Johnny "Drummachine" and Kaikai (who replaced David Stewart as guitarist). He was supported by Benga on all dates and Micky Slim, Sway, Baller B and P Money on selected dates.

== Singles ==
- "Say Nothing" is the album's lead single. It is produced by Dirty South, and was released on 16 September 2012. The single debuted at number 2 on the UK Singles Chart.
- "Close Enemies" is the second single from the album. It is produced by Alex Smith, and was released on 11 November 2012. The single debuted at number 37 on the UK Singles Chart but debuted at number 7 on the UK Indie and dance.
- "Perfect Replacement" is the third and final single from the album. It is produced by Feed Me and was released on 24 February 2013. The single peaked at number 46 on the UK Singles Chart but it peaked at number 7 on the UK Indie chart and number 9 on the UK Dance chart

== Reception ==
The album received mostly mixed to positive reviews from music critics.

Professional ratings
Aggregate scores
Source	Rating
Metacritic	65/100
Review scores
Source	Rating
Allmusic	3.5/5 stars
BBC Music	(favourable)
Digital Spy	3/5 stars
The Guardian	3/5 stars
The Independent	4/5 stars
NME	3/5 stars
SB.TV	(favourable)
Time Out London	3/5 stars
Virgin Media	2/5 stars

== Track listing ==
No.	Title	Writer(s)	Producer(s)	Length
1.	"Come Taste the Rainbow"	Elliot Gleave; Adegbenga Adejumo	Benga	4:11
2.	"Close Enemies"	Gleave; Alex Smith	Alex Smith	4:22
3.	"Perfect Replacement"	Gleave; Jon Gooch	Feed Me	3:28
4.	"Crying Out for Help"	Gleave; Thomas Olsen	Tommy Trash	4:13
5.	"Queen of Your Dreams"	Gleave; Alessandro Lindblad	Alesso	3:12
6.	"Say Nothing"	Gleave; Johnny McDaid; Dragan Roganović	Dirty South; Moám^{[b]}	3:41
7.	"All My Lows"	Gleave; Roganović	Dirty South	5:50
8.	"The Evolution of Man"	Gleave; Smith	Alex Smith	3:56
9.	"One Way Mirror"	Gleave; Roganović	Dirty South	4:39
10.	"Snakeskin"	Gleave; Andy Sheldrake; Ed Keeley	Sheldrake; Friction^{[a]}	4:22
11.	"Blood from a Stone"	Gleave; Zane Lowe	Zane Lowe	4:49
12.	"Are You Sitting Comfortably?"	Gleave; Oliver Jones	Skream	3:38
13.	"We'll Be Coming Back" (Calvin Harris and Example)	Gleave; Adam Wiles; Diane Warren	Calvin Harris	3:57
Total length:				54:21

Deluxe edition bonus tracks
No.	Title	Writer(s)	Producer(s)	Length
1.	"Let's Be Fucking Stupid"	Gleave; Ollie Corneer; Stefan Engblom	Dada Life	4:03
2.	"Someone to Die For" (with Dillon Francis)	Gleave; Dillon Francis	Dillon Francis	4:35
3.	"Whisper" (Example vs. AN21 & Max Vangeli)	Gleave; Antoine Josefsson; Max Vangeli	AN21 & Max Vangeli	4:01
4.	"Eutopia (Fade Away)" (with Laidback Luke)	Gleave; Luke van Scheppingen	Laidback Luke	4:30
5.	"Daydreamer" (Flux Pavilion featuring Example)	Gleave; Joshua Steele	Flux Pavilion	3:51
6.	"Say Nothing" (Hardwell and Dannic remix)	Gleave; McDaid; Roganović	Dirty South; Hardwell^{[c]}; Dannic^{[c]}	6:12
7.	"Close Enemies" (Joker remix)	Gleave; Smith	Alex Smith; Joker^{[c]}	4:07
8.	"Close Enemies" (Dyro remix)	Gleave; Smith	Alex Smith; Dyro^{[c]}	4:19
Total length:				89:59

Notes

- Track listing and credits from album booklet.
- ^{^a} signifies a co-producer
- ^{^b} signifies an additional producer
- ^{^c} signifies a remixer

== Personnel ==
- Elliot Gleave – vocals

Production

- Adam "Calvin Harris" Wiles – producer, mixing (13)
- Adegbenga "Benga" Adejumo – producer, mixing (1)
- Alessandro "Alesso" Lindbald – producer, mixing (5)
- Alex Smith – producer, mixing, vocal engineer (2, 8)
- Andy Sheldrake – producer, mixing (10)
- Antoine "AN21" Josefsson – producer, mixing (16)
- Dillon Francis – producer, mixing (15)
- Dragan "Dirty South" Roganovic – producer, mixing (6, 7, 9)
- Ed "Friction" Keeley – producer, mixing (10)
- Graham Coxon – guitars (4, 6, 10)
- Johnny McDaid – writer, backing vocals (6)
- Jon "Feed Me" Gooch – producer, mixing, mastering, guitars, keyboards (3)
- Jon Moon – vocal engineer
- Joshua "Flux Pavilion" Steele – producer, mixing (18)
- Luke van Scheppingen – producer, mixing (17)
- Max Vangeli – producer, mixing (16)
- Mike Marsh – mastering
- Morten "Moám" Hampenberg – additional production
- Oliver "Skream" Jones – producer, mixing (12)
- Ollie Corneer – producer, mixing (14)
- Phil Faversham – mixing, programming, additional production, mastering
- Shawn "Neon Stereo" Mohammadi – vocal engineer
- Simon Davey – mastering
- Stefan Engblom – producer, mixing (14)
- Thomas "Tommy Trash" Olsen – producer, mixing (4)
- Tom Goss – guitars
- Wez Clarke – drums, programming, vocal producer, mastering
- Zane Lowe – producer, mixing (11)

Additional personnel

- Alex Jenkins – artwork

== Charts ==
=== Weekly charts ===
Weekly chart performance for The Evolution of Man
Chart (2012)	Peak position
Australian Albums (ARIA)	40
Irish Albums (IRMA)	34
Scottish Albums (Official Charts)	14
UK Albums (Official Charts)	13
UK Dance Albums (Official Charts)	1
UK Independent Albums (Official Charts)	1

=== Year-end charts ===
Year-end chart performance for The Evolution of Man
Chart (2012)	Position
UK Albums (OCC)	162

== Release history ==
Region	Date	Format	Label
UK	19 November 2012	Digital download, CD	Ministry of Sound
Various	27 November 2012	Digital download, CD	Ministry of Sound
