= We May Grow Old But We Never Grow Up =

Studio album by Example
- Released: 17 June 2022
- Recorded: 2020–2022
- Genres: EDM; drum and bass; UK garage; house; hip-hop; drill
- Length: 47:52
- Label: BMG
- Producers: Gleave; James Angus; Sheldrake; Bou; Nero; Higgo; Kanine; Tommy Trash

Example chronology
Some Nights Last for Days (2020)	We May Grow Old But We Never Grow Up (2022)

Singles from We May Grow Old But We Never Grow Up
- 1. "Every Single Time" Released: 3 September 2021; 2. "Never Let You Down" Released: 28 January 2022; 3. "Deep" Released: 4 May 2022

We May Grow Old But We Never Grow Up is the eighth studio album by the English rapper Example, released on 17 June 2022 through BMG.

== Background and development ==
After releasing his seventh album Some Nights Last for Days through his own label Staneric Recordings in June 2020, Gleave signed an exclusive global recording deal with BMG in August 2021. This marked the first time Gleave signed to a public label since 2018, having been an independent artist since then.

Gleave wrote and recorded the majority of the album in his Brisbane studio alongside producer James Angus, often uploading videos on his Instagram story featuring snippets of songs throughout the recording process. Gleave also collaborated with Brisbane-based singer-songwriter Brooke Toia, performing under the stage name Penny Ivy, on most of the album’s tracks credited as a co-writer and performer. While announcing the album, Gleave stated “It’s the best album I’ve ever made. Hands down. Garage. Grime. DnB. House. Techno. Drill. Yes, DRILL."

The album's cover art was revealed on 6 May, with the tracklist and pre-order following on 22 May.

In an interview with Rolling Stone Australia, in regards to the album's title, Gleave stated "I’m about to turn 40, and this new album comes out the week of my 40th birthday, essentially, what the album is saying is 'just because we’re getting a bit older, doesn’t mean we can’t still have fun'.”

== Singles ==
- "Every Single Time" is the album's lead single. Released on 3 September 2021, it was produced by record producer What So Not and features vocals from singer-songwriter Lucy Lucy.
- "Never Let You Down" is the second single from the album. A collaboration with drum and bass producer Kanine, it was released on 28 January 2022 and features vocals from singer-songwriter Penny Ivy.
- "Deep" was released on 4 May 2022 as the third and final single from the album. It is a collaboration with record producer Bou and features vocals from singer-songwriter Nonô.

== Reception ==
Professional ratings
Review scores
Source	Rating
Oz EDM	4.5/5
Rolling Stone Australia	(favourable)
We Rave You	(favourable)
The Yorkshire Times	(favourable)

The album received mostly positive reviews from music critics and fans, many citing the fun nature of the album, as well as highlighting the exploration of different genres throughout and Gleave's growth as an artist over the years, with some even calling the album his best work to date.

== Track listing ==
We May Grow Old But We Never Grow Up track listing
No.	Title	Writer(s)	Producer(s)	Length
1.	"We May Grow Old But We Never Grow Up"	Elliot Gleave; Andrew Sheldrake; Brooke Toia	Sheldrake	3:33
2.	"Dot Dot Dot" (featuring Nerve and Local)	Gleave; James Angus; Toby Nicholls; Richard Sheppard	Angus	3:44
3.	"Original"	Gleave; Christian Francis Monaco; Angus	Angus	3:00
4.	"Best Laid Plans" (featuring Penny Ivy)	Gleave; Monaco; Toia; Angus	Gleave; Angus	3:33
5.	"Deep" (with Bou featuring Nonô)	Gleave; Amine Bouguenna; Noemia Lellis	Bou	3:07
6.	"Sideways"	Gleave; Dan Stephens; Joe Ray; Francis Novotny; Kai Kai Smith; Wez Clarke	Nero	3:29
7.	"Every Single Time" (featuring Lucy Lucy and What So Not)	Gleave; Angus; Lucy Washington; Christopher John Emerson	What So Not; Angus	2:47
8.	"Faith" (with Majestic)	Gleave; Sheldrake; Angus; Kevin Christie; Samuel Wire; Clarke	Sheldrake; Angus; Wire	3:20
9.	"I'm About (Only Got Today)" (featuring Westneat and Penny Ivy)	Gleave; Toia; Angus; Cameron Westneat-Smith	Gleave; Angus	2:56
10.	"Rainy Days"	Gleave; Toia; Angus; Joe Higgins	Gleave; Higgo	3:39
11.	"Internal Affairs" (featuring Livsey)	Gleave; Toia; Angus; Oliver Livsey	Gleave; Angus; Livsey	2:39
12.	"Never Let You Down" (with Kanine featuring Penny Ivy)	Gleave; Toia; Fergus Bossert; Erin McNaught	Kanine	3:08
13.	"Dumm"	Gleave; Toia; Angus	Gleave; Angus	2:22
14.	"Won't Forget You" (with Tommy Trash featuring Window Kid)	Gleave; Thomas Olsen; Greg Pikett	Tommy Trash	3:20
15.	"Egyptian Cotton" (featuring Local, JME and Westneat)	Gleave; Toia; Sheppard; Chandler Jevon Hammond; Jamie Adenuga; Smith	Gleave; Angus	3:07
Total length:				47:52

== Personnel ==
- Elliot Gleave – vocals, writing, additional producer
- James Angus – producer, mixing, writing
- Amine Bouguenna – producer, mixing (5)
- Christopher John Emerson – producer, mixing (7)
- Samuel Wire – producer, mixing, writing (8)
- Joe Higgins – producer, mixing, writing (10)
- Fergus Bossert – producer, mixing (12)
- Thomas Olsen – producer, mixing (14)
- Toby Nicholls – vocals, writing (2)
- Richard Sheppard – vocals, writing (2, 15)
- Brooke Toia – vocals, writing (4, 9, 12), additional writing (1, 10, 11, 13, 15)
- Noemia Lellis – vocals, writing (5)
- Lucy Washington – vocals, writing (7)
- Kevin Christie – vocals, writing (8)
- Cameron Westneat-Smith – vocals, writing (9, 15)
- Oliver Livsey – vocals, writing (11)
- Greg Pikett – vocals, writing (14)
- Jamie Adenuga – vocals, writing (15)
- Wez Clarke – writing (6, 8)
- Erin McNaught – writing (12)
- Chandler Jevon Hammond – writing (15)

== Charts ==
Weekly chart performance for We May Grow Old But We Never Grow Up
Chart (2022)	Peak position
Scottish Albums (Official Charts)	37
UK Albums (Official Charts)	64
UK Album Downloads (Official Charts)	39
UK Dance Albums (Official Charts)	5
UK Independent Albums (Official Charts)	3
