= AEI Group =

London-based digital media and music company

- Genre: Bass Music
- Founded: 1998
- Founder: Diluk Dias; James Cotterill
- Headquarters: London, United Kingdom
- Parent: AEI Venture
- Website: https://www.aei.co.uk/

AEI Media is a London-based digital media and music company established in 1998 by James Cotterill and Diluk Dias.

== History ==
In 1996, before AEI Media was born, James Cotterill created Drum&BassArena. Two year later he co-created AEI Media with Diluk Dias (and Drum&BassArena became part of AEI Media).

In 2016 AEI Media was rebranded AEI Group

== Music labels ==
=== UKF Music ===
In 2012 AEI Media bought half of the UKF brand from Luke Hood.

=== All Trap Music ===
Brand aiming Trap music established on 18th of July 2012 by Jim Kirk (JiKay).

It joined AEI Media in Feb. 2013.
