= Whisky Story =

Single by Example
- Released: 10 July 2015
- Recorded: 2014–15
- Genre: Dance-pop; electronic soul
- Length: 3:09
- Label: Epic; Ultra
- Songwriters: Elliot Gleave; Kevin Scales; Mark Knight; Jamie Reynolds
- Producers: Kevin Scales; Mark Knight; Jamie Reynolds

Example singles chronology
"10 Million People" (2014)	"Whisky Story" (2015)	"Reflections" (2015)

"Whisky Story" is a song by British recording artist Example. It was released as a single on 10 July 2015. The song was written by Example and co-written and produced by Kevin Scales, Mark Knight and Jamie Reynolds. It entered the UK Singles Chart at number 106 and peaked at number 96.

== Background and release ==
The track received its radio debut on Clara Amfo's BBC Radio 1 show on 9 July 2015, where Gleave announced it was to be released as a single.

Gleave stated that he found inspiration for the track on nights out and his youth. He also said that he started writing the song just after his son was born in December 2014.

== Music video ==
Gleave uploaded the music video for the track on 9 July 2015, just after it premiered on the radio. The video was shot in one take. It was directed by Gleave himself and Adam Powell. It features Gleave walking from an underground train at Charing Cross station to Trafalgar Square in London with several people dancing and singing around him.

== Track listing ==
Digital download
No.	Title	Length
1.	"Whisky Story" (Radio Edit)	3:09

== Charts ==
Chart (2015)	Peak position
UK Singles (OCC)	96

== Release history ==
Region	Date	Format	Label
United Kingdom	10 July 2015	Digital download	Epic Records
