= Perfect Replacement =

Single by Example

from the album The Evolution of Man
- Released: 24 February 2013
- Recorded: 2011–12
- Genre: Progressive house; electro house
- Length: 3:28
- Label: Ministry of Sound
- Songwriters: Elliot Gleave; Jon Gooch
- Producer: Feed Me

Example singles chronology
"Close Enemies" (2012)	"Perfect Replacement" (2013)	"All the Wrong Places" (2013)

"Perfect Replacement" is a song by British recording artist Example. It was released as the third single from his fourth studio album, The Evolution of Man, on 24 February 2013 following his UK arena tour. The song was written by Elliot Gleave and Feed Me, the latter who also produced the song.

== Background and release ==
"Perfect Replacement" received its live debut in August 2012 at the V Festival, and was played on 17 September 2012 at the iTunes Festival. The track received its radio debut on Greg James' BBC Radio 1 show on 15 November 2012, where Gleave announced it was to be released as a single.

On 6 December 2012, the remixes on the EP were announced. The single was due to feature remixes from R3hab & Hard Rock Sofa, Danny Howard, Datsik, Route 94 and Toyboy & Robin. However, the Route 94 remix was not finished in time to be released. The Danny Howard and R3hab & Hard Rock Sofa remixes were uploaded to the Ministry of Sound YouTube channel on 21 December 2012 and 2 January 2013 respectively, while the Datsik remix was uploaded on UKF Music's channel UKFDubstep.

== Music video ==
Gleave requested that members of the public applied to feature as ravers in the video, to be filmed on 10 December. The video shoot was finished on 11 December 2012. The video was released onto YouTube at 12:30 am on New Year's Day 2013, at a total length of four minutes and twenty-four seconds.

== Track listing ==
Digital download
No.	Title	Length
1.	"Perfect Replacement" (Radio Edit)	3:27
2.	"Perfect Replacement" (Extended Mix)	5:18
3.	"Perfect Replacement" (Danny Howard Remix)	5:57
4.	"Perfect Replacement" (R3hab & Hard Rock Sofa Extended Vocal Mix)	6:29
5.	"Perfect Replacement" (Datsik Remix)	4:05
6.	"Perfect Replacement" (Toyboy & Robin's 1999 Remix)	3:57

== Chart performance ==
Chart (2013)	Peak position
Ireland (IRMA)	56
Scottish Singles Sales (Official Charts)	38
UK Dance (Official Charts)	9
UK Indie (Official Charts)	7
UK Singles (Official Charts)	46

== Release history ==
Region	Date	Format	Label
United Kingdom	24 February 2013	Digital download	Ministry of Sound
