= The Answer (Example song) =

Single by Example
- Released: 19 January 2018
- Recorded: 2017
- Length: 3:09
- Label: Columbia
- Songwriters: Elliot Gleave; Raoul Chen
- Producers: Diztortion; Example

Example singles chronology
"Lights Out" (2017)	"The Answer" (2018)	"Nine Point Nine" (2018)

"The Answer" is a song by British recording artist Example. It was released as a single on 19 January 2018. The song was written and produced by Example himself with the collaboration of Raoul "Diztortion" Chen and was included in BBC Radio 1's "New Music Friday" playlist.

== Background ==
The song was originally taken from his then-upcoming sixth studio album, which he described as "a collection of songs I want to still be performing ten years from now". He had written 50 songs for the project and had the album finished for over a year, waiting for his label to allow him to put it out, but was ultimately left unreleased.

== Music video ==
The music video, directed by Dominic O'Riordan and produced by Hannah Bilverstone, was premiered the same day the song was released, on 19 January 2018.

== Live performances ==
Example performed the song on The Last Leg on 16 February 2018.

== Track listing ==
- Digital download
1. The Answer - 3:09
- Brunelle remix
1. The Answer (Brunelle remix) - 2:42
- James Hype remix
1. The Answer (James Hype remix) - 3:10
- Sevaqk remix featuring Wretch 32 & Cadet
1. The Answer (Sevaqk remix featuring Wretch 32 & Cadet) - 3:01
- Acoustic version featuring Hayla
1. The Answer (acoustic version featuring Hayla) - 2:51

== Release history ==
Region	Date	Format	Version	Label	Ref
Worldwide	19 January 2018	Digital download	Original	Columbia Records	
Worldwide	26 January 2018	Digital download	Brunelle remix	Columbia Records	
Worldwide	2 February 2018	Digital download	James Hype remix	Columbia Records	
Worldwide	21 February 2018	Digital download	Sevaqk remix featuring Wretch 32 & Cadet	Columbia Records	
Worldwide	2 March 2018	Digital download	Acoustic version featuring Hayla	Columbia Records	
