= Charles Dye =

American record producer, sound engineer, mix engineer

- Origin: Florida, U.S.
- Genres: Latin, Pop; Rock
- Occupations: Record producer; sound engineer; mix engineer
- Years active: 1992–present
- Labels: Fifty Fifty Records

Charles Dye is a Grammy-nominated and Latin Grammy-winning record producer, engineer and mixer from Hollywood, Florida, USA.

== Grammy ==
In 2001, Dye received a Latin Grammy for Best Engineered Album for Thalía's Arrasando.

Other production credits include John Ralston, Robi Draco Rosa, Ricky Martin, Jon Bon Jovi, Julio Iglesias, Sammy Hagar, Billie Myers, Jon Secada and Jenna Drey, as well as recording Lauryn Hill, Shakira, Aerosmith, Jennifer Lopez, Thalía, Hanson and Gloria Estefan.
