= Say Nothing (Example song) =

2012 single by Example

Single by Example

from the album The Evolution of Man
- Released: 16 September 2012
- Genre: Electronic
- Length: 3:46
- Label: Ministry of Sound
- Songwriters: Elliot Gleave; Johnny McDaid; Dragan Roganović
- Producers: Dirty South; Moám

Example singles chronology
"We'll Be Coming Back" (2012)	"Say Nothing" (2012)	"Close Enemies" (2012)

"Say Nothing" is a song by British singer Example, released on 16 September 2012 in the United Kingdom as the lead single from his fourth studio album The Evolution of Man (2012). The song was written by Example, Johnny McDaid, and Dirty South, and was produced by the latter alongside Moám. The song features guitar work by Graham Coxon.

"Say Nothing" entered the UK Singles Chart at number 2, held off the top spot by The Script's "Hall of Fame", which spent a second week at number one.

== Background and release ==
"Say Nothing" received its world premiere on 30 July 2012 on the Capital FM Breakfast Show. NME confirmed that the single would feature remixes from Roska, TC, BURNS, Foamo and Hardwell. The interview also stated that "Say Nothing" and "Perfect Replacement" would receive their live debuts in August 2012 at the V Festival.

On 30 July 2012, Example revealed the single artwork via Twitter and confirmed via a comment on Facebook that it features a photo of his younger self, around two years old layered over a photo he took in Austria on an aeroplane. In an interview, he revealed that the original photo won a 'Good Looking Baby' contest in his local paper, and he wanted the single artwork to be different from the popular 'boring' artwork, and just wanted it to look 'cool'.

== Critical reception ==
The single has received mixed reviews. It was criticised for the double negative 'don't speak no more' by Popjustice, but generally getting good reception. Capital FM received many positive tweets from listeners after the world premiere and 4Music expressed their love for it, saying it was 'definitely worth the wait' with a 'humongous guitar riff and big stadium chorus'. Digital Spy rated it four stars, calling it "an electronic anthem that's ready to take over the airwaves" and commenting that it "maintains a sense of depth, proving that despite his questionable celebrity jibes his talent still comes out on top".

== Music video ==
The official video for "Say Nothing" premiered on Example's YouTube channel on 8 August 2012. The video was recorded in Almería, Andalucia, Spain.

== Track listing ==
Digital download
No.	Title	Length
1.	"Say Nothing" (Radio Edit)	3:46
2.	"Say Nothing" (Extended Club Mix)	5:45
3.	"Say Nothing" (Hardwell and Dannic Remix)	6:15
4.	"Say Nothing" (Foamo Remix)	5:41
5.	"Say Nothing" (Roska Remix)	3:37
6.	"Say Nothing" (TC Remix)	3:44

"Say Nothing" (BURNS Remix) – single
No.	Title	Length
1.	"Say Nothing" (BURNS Remix)	4:39

CD single (EP)
No.	Title	Length
1.	"Say Nothing" (Radio Edit)	3:46
2.	"Say Nothing" (Extended Club Mix)	5:45
3.	"Say Nothing" (Hardwell and Dannic Remix)	6:15
4.	"Say Nothing" (BURNS Remix)	4:39
5.	"Say Nothing" (Foamo Remix)	5:41
6.	"Say Nothing" (Roska Remix)	3:37
7.	"Say Nothing" (TC Remix)	3:44
8.	"Say Nothing" (Instrumental Edit)	3:46

CD single
No.	Title	Length
1.	"Say Nothing" (Radio Edit)	3:46
2.	"Say Nothing" (Extended Club Mix)	5:45

== Credits and personnel ==
Adapted from the parent album's liner notes.

- Example – songwriter
- Johnny McDaid – songwriter, backing vocals
- Dirty South – songwriter, producer, keyboards and drum programming
- Moám – additional production, keyboards and synthesizers
- Wez Clarke – mixer, additional programming and drums
- Jon Moon – vocal recording
- Graham Coxon – guitars
- Tom Goss – guitars

== Charts ==
=== Weekly charts ===
Weekly chart performance for "Say Nothing"
Chart (2012)	Peak position
Australia (ARIA)	54
Czech Republic (Rádio – Top 100)	94
Ireland (IRMA)	22
Scotland Singles (OCC)	2
Slovakia (Rádio Top 100)	66
UK Singles (OCC)	2
UK Dance (OCC)	1
UK Indie (OCC)	1

=== Year-end charts ===
Year-end chart performance for "Say Nothing"
Chart (2012)	Peak position
UK Singles (OCC)	173
