= Close Enemies =

Single by Example

from the album The Evolution of Man
- Released: 11 November 2012
- Recorded: 2011–12
- Genre: Dance
- Length: 3:44
- Label: Ministry of Sound
- Songwriter(s): Elliot Gleave; Alex Smith
- Producer(s): Alex Smith

Example singles chronology
"Say Nothing" (2012)	"Close Enemies" (2012)	"Perfect Replacement" (2013)

"Close Enemies" is a song by British recording artist Example. It was released on 11 November 2012 as the second single from his fourth studio album, The Evolution of Man. The song was written by Elliot Gleave and Alex Smith, the latter who also produced the song. It entered the UK Singles Chart on 18 November 2012 at number 37. Gleave and his band performed a live version of the song for BBC Radio 1's Live Lounge, which features on the Live Lounge 2013 compilation album.

== Background and release ==
"Close Enemies" received its live debut at the Norwich UEA on 15 September 2012, and was performed on 17 September 2012 at the iTunes Festival. The track received its radio debut on Zane Lowe's BBC Radio 1 show, where it was announced to be Zane Lowe's hottest record in the world on 26 September 2012 and the lyric video was made public on Example's official YouTube channel on the same evening.

The DJ Wire remix was uploaded to UKF Drum & Bass on 4 October 2012 and the Rollz remix was uploaded to UKF Music on 8 October 2012. Due to the large amount of remixes for the song, two extended plays were released. One contains the original and extended mixes alongside four remixes and the other EP consists entirely of four remixes. The Joker and Dyro remixes also feature on the deluxe edition of The Evolution of Man.

Talking about the song, Example said: "it's got the light, the dark, the emotion, it's got the guitars, it's got the electronic elements, the rapping, the half time dubstep bits, everything I wanted to do is embodied by this record so it was the one to lead the album with." Example has collaborated with producer Alex Smith in the past, as the two had co-written "Chasing the Sun" by The Wanted.

== Critical reception ==
Robert Copsey of Digital Spy gave the song a positive review stating:

If 'Close Enemies' is anything to go by, the answer is a firm no. "Your smile should have told me you're trouble," he half-sings over a menacing guitar riff and moody synths, before breaking out into a gloopy, dubsteppy and suitably epic chorus. The result, despite the whiff of alt-rock, largely sticks to his tried and tested methods – though it comes at a time when he should be doing just the opposite..

== Music video ==
=== Background ===
A music video to accompany the release of "Close Enemies" was first released onto YouTube on 8 October 2012 at a total length of three minutes and fifty-five seconds. The video was directed by Rankin. On Twitter, Example said: "As per usual my new music video will not make any sense or have anything to do with the song. I like it this way. There is a clown in it tho."

=== Synopsis ===
The video starts with a warning message for "Restricted Audiences Only". He is seen rapping in a warehouse. During the video, the rapper shares scenes with a female who continues to flicker between human and zombie as they stand face to face. There is also a menacing looking clown, a huge man wielding a chainsaw and a troubled soldier.

== Track listing ==
Digital download
No.	Title	Length
1.	"Close Enemies" (Radio Edit)	3:44
2.	"Close Enemies" (Extended Mix)	6:03
3.	"Close Enemies" (Jakob Liedholm Remix)	5:40
4.	"Close Enemies" (Riddim Commission Remix)	4:19
5.	"Close Enemies" (DJ Wire Remix)	4:39
6.	"Close Enemies" (Woz Remix)	4:05

Close Enemies (The Remixes) – EP
No.	Title	Length
1.	"Close Enemies" (Joker Remix)	4:06
2.	"Close Enemies" (Dyro Remix)	4:19
3.	"Close Enemies" (Nathan C Remix)	6:33
4.	"Close Enemies" (Rollz Remix)	5:13

CD single (MOSCDSP244)
No.	Title	Length
1.	"Close Enemies" (Radio Edit)	3:44
2.	"Close Enemies" (Extended Mix)	6:03
3.	"Close Enemies" (Jakob Liedholm Remix)	5:40
4.	"Close Enemies" (Riddim Commission Remix)	4:19
5.	"Close Enemies" (DJ Wire Remix)	4:39
6.	"Close Enemies" (Joker Remix)	4:06
7.	"Close Enemies" (Rollz Remix)	5:13
8.	"Close Enemies" (Woz Remix)	4:05

== Chart performance ==
On 18 November 2012 the song entered the UK Singles Chart at number 37.

=== Charts ===
Chart (2012)	Peak position
Scotland (OCC)	37
UK Dance (OCC)	7
UK Indie (OCC)	2
UK Singles (OCC)	37

== Release history ==
Region	Date	Format	Label
United Kingdom	11 November 2012	Digital download	Ministry of Sound
