= Technikal =

British dance music disc jockey

- Born: Alf Bamford
- Genres: Hard trance, Hard dance (as Technikal), Happy hardcore, UK hardcore (as Technikore)
- Occupations: disc jockey, record producer
- Years active: 2002 -
- Website: www.technikal.co.uk

Alf Bamford, known professionally as Technikal, is a British hard trance and hard dance disc jockey and record producer.

== Biography ==
Bamford started becoming known as a "cutting edge" hard dance DJ c. 2002, when his single "Annihilation" garnered significant airplay on the BBC Radio 1 John Peel show. Bamford, as well as being known under the alias Technikal, also releases music under the further alternate name Technikore.

Technikal reached number 10 in the UK official dance music chart in 2005, with his single "Global Panic/System Shock". As Technikore Bamford has performed on BBC Radio 1, including a guest mix for the Kutski show in 2011.

In January 2012 Technikal released the mix album Resonate 6 - The Brutal Sound of Hard Trance on the Tidy Trax label. It was critically well received in Mixmag magazine with a 10/10 rating, and was named Compilation of the Month. Later in September that same year, the Technikal "eclectic" hard dance compilation album Soldier of Sound was also named as Mixmag Compilation of the Month.

As Technikore, along with Andy Farley and Mark Eg, he released the 2012 compilation album Harder Louder Faster. Featuring tracks running at c. 140-175 BPM, the album was named as a Mixmag Compilation of the Month for November.

As Bamford, he co-wrote the Example song "All the Wrong Places", which peaked at number 13 in the UK singles chart in 2013. In September 2016 his single produced with Steve Hill and Yoz, "Keep On Rockin", was named as Mixmag tune of the month. In 2022 a track co-produced with Suae, "Dance With The Groove", was included on the compilation album Devotions: Chapter I.

As of 2016, Bamford has moved to Australia.

== Discography ==
Technikal singles
Title	Artist	Year	Peak UK singles	Peak UK dance	Peak UK Ind
"Global Panic/System Shock"	Technikal PTS	2005	84	10	19
"N20 (Found Some Gas)/Anxious Heart"	Technikal	2006			42
"More & More/Bad Girl"	Kym Ayers ft. Technikal	2006			30
"Match Point"	Tony Heron & Frank Farrell (Technikal remix)	2012			
"Ideal"	Technikal	2014			
"Your World"	Technikal	2016			
"Keep On Rockin"	Technikal, Steve Hill & Yoz	2016			
"All That It Takes (Draugen Anthem)"	Technikore	2017			
"Thank You"	Technikal, Steve Hill & Francesco	2018			
"Freakz"	Technikore & Ravine	2018			

== See also ==
- Category:Songs written by Technikal
