= UKF Music =

British record label

UKF
- Product type: Electronic music
- Country: United Kingdom
- Introduced: April 2009
- Markets: Worldwide
- Ambassador: Luke Hood
- Tagline: The home of bass music
- Website: www.ukf.com
- Parent: AEI Group

UKF (short for United Kingdom and Frome) is a record label founded by Luke Hood that focuses on promoting electronic music. Hood began sharing bass music through his original two YouTube channels, UKF Drum & Bass and UKF Dubstep, in 2009. The UKF brand has since expanded to five YouTube channels: UKF Music, UKF Dubstep, UKF Drum & Bass, UKF Mixes and UKF On Air. UKF has expanded beyond its YouTube channels to creating compilation series and podcasts, organising events, offering merchandise as well as its own ticketing platform.

== History ==
Luke Hood created UKF on YouTube to share music with friends while studying at Frome Community College in 2009. As his subscriber base began to grow, he started to focus on the music channels and expanding the UKF brand. The brand has since sold half of its ownership to AEI Group and plans to take advantage of YouTube's live streaming function to broadcast their events that now occur throughout Europe and North America.

The name UKF stands for United Kingdom and Frome, Luke Hood's hometown.

In January 2012 Your Hidden Potential, a UK-based platform for aspiring entrepreneurs, named Luke Hood one of the top 20 young entrepreneurs to watch. At the 2012 Red Bull Elektropedia Awards in Belgium, UKF took home the award for 'Best Really Big Party', and an award for Visual Iconography for both of their sell out shows in Belgium.

In October 2019, UKF held a ten-year anniversary event in the Cheese and Grain hall in Frome.

On 13 December 2024, to commemorate their 15th anniversary, UKF held an event in Drumsheds, London.

== Compilation albums ==
Title	Album details	Peak chart positions
Title	Album details	US Dance
UKF Dubstep 2010	Released: 28 November 2010; Format: Digital	7
UKF Drum & Bass 2010	Released: 19 December 2010; Format: Digital	—
Circus One	Released: 1 May 2011; Format: Digital, Compact disc	—
UKF Bass Culture	Released: 31 July 2011; Format: Digital, Compact disc	15
UKF Bass Culture 2	Released: 2 September 2012; Format: Digital, Compact disc	18
UKF Dubstep 2011	Released: 27 September 2011; Format: Digital	3
UKF Drum & Bass 2011	Released: 27 November 2011; Format: Digital	3
UKF Dubstep 2012	Released: 9 December 2012; Format: Digital, Compact disc	4
UKF Drum & Bass 2012	Released: 10 December 2012; Format: Digital, Compact disc	—
UKF Drum & Bass 2013	Released: 13 December 2013; Format: Digital	—
UKF Dubstep 2013	Released: 15 December 2013; Format: Digital	8
UKF Bass Culture 3	Released: 12 September 2014; Format: Digital, Compact disc	—
UKF Drum & Bass 2014	Released: 14 December 2014; Format: Digital, Compact disc	—
UKF Dubstep 2014	Released: 18 December 2014; Format: Digital, Compact disc	15
UKF Dubstep 2015	Released: 11 December 2015; Format: Digital, Compact disc	21
UKF Drum & Bass 2015	Released: 11 December 2015; Format: Digital, Compact disc	—
UKF Dubstep 2016	Released: 2 December 2016; Format: Digital, Compact disc, Vinyl	5
UKF Drum & Bass 2016	Released: 9 December 2016; Format: Digital, Compact disc, Vinyl	—
UKF Dubstep 2017	Released: 1 December 2017; Format: Digital, Compact disc, Vinyl	—
UKF Drum & Bass 2017	Released: 1 December 2017; Format: Digital, Compact disc, Vinyl	—
UKF Bass Culture 4	Released: 28 September 2018; Format: Digital, Compact disc	—
UKF10 – Ten Years of UKF	Released: 29 November 2019; Format: Digital, Vinyl	—
