= Example (musician) =

British musician (born 1982)

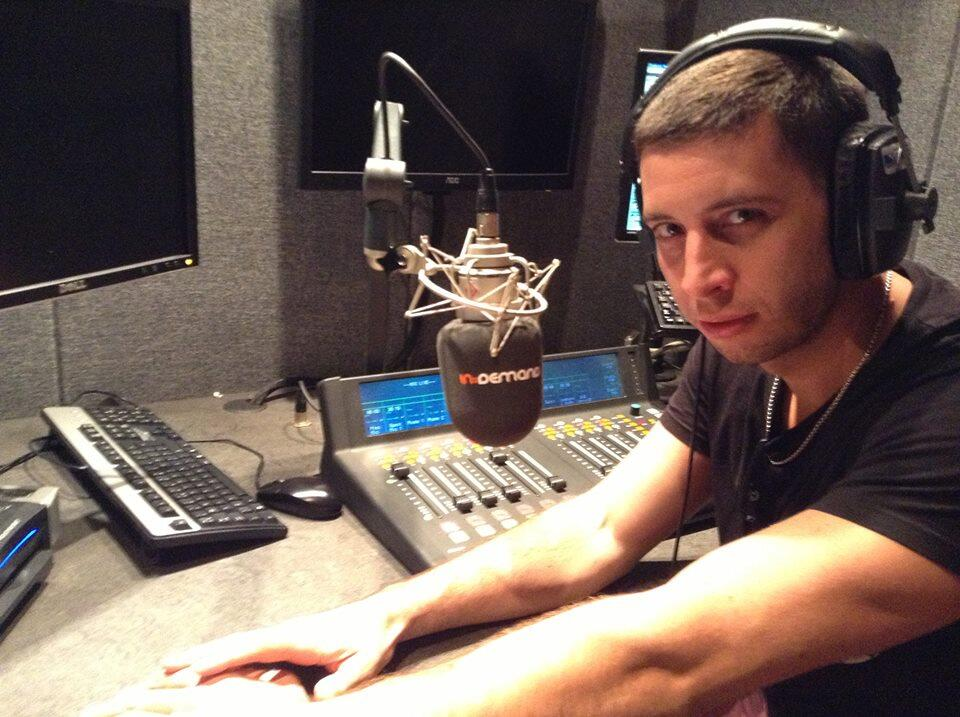
- Example in 2013
- Born: Elliot John Gleave; 20 June 1982 (age 44); Hammersmith, London, England
- Education: Royal Holloway, University of London
- Occupations: Singer; songwriter; rapper; record producer
- Years active: 2003–present
- Spouse: Erin McNaught (m. 2013; sep. 2022)
- Children: 3
- Musical career
- Genres: Hip house; hip hop; eurodance; EDM
- Labels: Staneric; Sony; Epic; Mercury; Ultra; Ministry of Sound; Data; The Beats; Warner; All the Chats
- Website: trythisforexample.com

Elliot John Gleave (born 20 June 1982), known professionally as Example, is an English singer, songwriter, rapper, and record producer. He released his debut studio album, What We Made, in 2007, followed by the mixtape What We Almost Made in 2008. Example first found success in 2010 with the release of his second studio album, Won't Go Quietly, which peaked at number four on the UK Albums Chart and number one on the UK Dance Chart. The album had two top 10 singles, "Won't Go Quietly" and "Kickstarts".

Example's third studio album, Playing in the Shadows, was released in September 2011 and topped the charts with two number one singles, "Changed the Way You Kiss Me" and "Stay Awake". His fourth studio album, The Evolution of Man, was released in November 2012 and peaked at number 13 on the UK Albums Chart and number one on the UK Dance Chart.

In 2013, Example released the lead single from his next album, entitled "All the Wrong Places", which peaked at number 13 on the UK Singles Chart. The following year, he released the single "Kids Again", which also peaked at number 13 on the UK Singles Chart. His fifth studio album, Live Life Living, was released in July 2014.

== Early life ==
Example was born as Elliot John Gleave in West London Hospital in Hammersmith. In a 2012 interview with The Guardian, he was stated to have Asperger syndrome, attention deficit hyperactivity disorder and obsessive–compulsive disorder. He said "I was diagnosed with Asperger's when I was younger. I was amazing with numbers, I had a photographic memory, and I hated reading fiction, preferring books on nature and history. All symptoms of mild autism." He referenced this in the opening track to his fourth album The Evolution of Man, "Come Taste the Rainbow". He has a younger sister, named Elise. He later went on to attend ADT College (now Ashcroft Technology Academy) in Putney. Example has claimed in interviews that the main reason he started rapping was due to his introduction to hip-hop through albums by Wu-Tang Clan and Snoop Dogg – the latter's album purchased primarily for "the cool cover art", and to the fact that he was not particularly good at any sports, so started rapping to fit in socially. His first experience of rapping was through a rap battle at a house party in Shepherd's Bush in 1994, when he was 12 years old. In that battle, he, in his own words, "completely destroyed a useless wanker and a fight broke out so (he) sprinted home". He got his stage name Example from a school friend, after his initials E. G.

Gleave went on to study BA Media Arts at Royal Holloway, University of London, graduating in 2004. It was during this period that he met Joseph Gardner, AKA Rusher, the producer whom he would go on to work with during his time releasing tracks independently through his All The Chats imprint, and later on Mike Skinner's label The Beats. Gleave and Gardner made a concept album in the audio booth of the university film department; this concept album contained the track which would go on to be Example's first white-label vinyl release, "A Pointless Song".

He returned to the UK and became a voiceover artist and editor for the Paramount Comedy Channel (now Comedy Central), also working as an editor at MTV Networks.

== Career ==
=== 2004–2008: Record deal and What We Made ===
After releasing three singles through his own label "All The Chats", including the original 7" version of "I Don't Want To" in January 2006, Example received attention from Pete Tong, Zane Lowe and others at Radio 1.

After signing a deal in April 2006 with The Beats, Example put out a response to Lily Allen's number one hit "Smile" entitled "Vile" and received Radio 1 airplay from Zane Lowe, Jo Whiley and Chris Moyles. His first 'proper' release on The Beats was "What We Made" in November 2006, the video for which was filmed in Chernobyl, Ukraine (see below).

Example's second official Beats single entitled "You Can't Rap" was released in March 2007, followed by a re-release of "I Don't Want To" on 11 June 2007. "I Don't Want To" was followed by the single "So Many Roads" (famously sampling The Carpenters' "We've Only Just Begun") which eventually turned out to be the opening track on Example's full-length studio debut. After the demise of The Beats label at the end of 2007 Example self-released his next single "Me + Mandy" on 10 March 2008 through his original imprint All The Chats. The video for "Me + Mandy" was shot over four days and nights in London, in over 30 locations with over 40 extras. This was done at a cost of just £1000. It was directed by Example's friend Henry Scholfield who also made the promos for "Who Needs Sunshine?", "Vile", "You Can't Rap" and "I Don't Want To".

In February 2008, Example also tried his hand at stand-up comedy as part of BBC2's The Culture Show. Mentored by English comic Richard Herring, Example spent six weeks writing and practicing his own stand-up routine which culminated in his first ever stand-up show in front of 60 paying customers in a Covent Garden pub. A week later he appeared on the bill under Richard Herring, Phill Jupitus and Harry Hill at the Lyric Hammersmith – Example had performed in the same venue ten years earlier whilst a student at ADT College.

=== 2009–2010: Commercial breakout with Won't Go Quietly ===
Example made his first chart appearance in September 2009, when he released "Watch the Sun Come Up" as the lead single from his second album Won't Go Quietly through Data Records. The single debuted at number 20 on the UK singles chart, rising to number 19 the following week. The single was followed by a release of "Won't Go Quietly", released on 18 January 2010. The single debuted at number six in the United Kingdom, marking Example's first appearance within the top 10. It also peaked 36 in Ireland. The announcement was then made in April 2010 that the second album Won't Go Quietly would be released on 21 June 2010 and would be preceded by the single "Kickstarts". Receiving its radio debut on 13 April by then-BBC Radio 1 DJ Zane Lowe, the song was produced by Sub Focus. "Kickstarts" was released on 20 June, where it debuted at number three. Released the following week, the album Won't Go Quietly debuted at number four on the UK Albums Chart. On 12 September, Example released "Last Ones Standing" as the fourth cut from the album, where it reached a peak of number 27 in the United Kingdom and 37 in Ireland. On 14 November 2010, he released the final single off the album "Two Lives", though it only peaked at 84 on the UK Singles Chart. On the other hand, it was able to peak at number 10 position on the UK Dance Chart. In May 2010, he made a Collab with Ed Sheeran in a song about Nandos. The video gained 5.6 million views on YouTube and as a result of this Ed Sheeran got a Nando's black card.

=== 2011–2012: Playing in the Shadows ===
In June 2011, Example released his first single from his third album, "Changed the Way You Kiss Me" where it debuted at number one in the UK. The song also charted in many European countries and Australia, where it was also certified Platinum. The second song of the album "Stay Awake", which was produced by Nero, was debuted on 1 July 2011 on BBC Radio 1 by Annie Mac. It was released in August, and also debuted at number one. His third single "Midnight Run" was released in December 2011 and reached number 30 in the UK Singles Chart.

In September 2011, his third studio album was released. Playing in the Shadows debuted at number one in the UK albums chart and also charted in Australia, Ireland and New Zealand.

=== 2012–2013: The Evolution of Man ===
Example confirmed he was to have a track he wrote for The Wanted to be featured on their debut US album, The Wanted. The song is called "Chasing The Sun". The track was released as a single in April 2012 in USA and May 2012 in the United Kingdom, featuring remixes from Hardwell and Tantrum Desire and peaking at number two in the UK Singles Chart, and receiving worldwide recognition. In January 2012, Example signed a US record deal with Mercury, which is part of Universal. He is hoping to crack America on his own terms with his next album.

On 17 August 2012, the 2013 tour dates were announced. The 13-date tour started on 11 February 2013 in Bournemouth and finished at the Manchester Arena on 1 March 2013. Support comes from British dubstep producer Benga who also produced Example's album track "Come Taste the Rainbow".

The lead single "Say Nothing" was released in September 2012, debuting at number two in the UK charts. His second single from the album entitled "Close Enemies" was released in November 2012 and peaked to number 37 in the UK charts. The album was released on 19 November, shortly after the release of "Close Enemies". The Evolution of Man reached a peak position of 13 in the UK charts. "Perfect Replacement" was announced as the third and final single of the album; it was thought before that "Queen of Your Dreams" would be the third single, but Example ended up opting for "Perfect Replacement". It was released in February 2013 and peaked at number 46 in the UK charts.

A song entitled "Where Did The Sun Go?" was also expected to appear on the album or one of the deluxe versions, due to live performances, but Example confirmed on his official Twitter account that the song had been scrapped due to him and its producer Alvin Risk "not liking it" or it "not being me" (referring to himself).

=== 2013–2014: Live Life Living and Epic Records signing ===
On 15 April 2013, he stated on Facebook that he was in Los Angeles working on his fifth studio album. The album was due to be released in June 2014. Five album tracks were written and produced in Los Angeles with Stuart Price. The lead single from the album, titled "All the Wrong Places", was debuted at his Auckland concert in New Zealand on 24 April.

Example collaborated with Pet Shop Boys on their song "Thursday" from their 2013 studio album Electric, released on 15 July 2013. The song was released as a single on 4 November 2013 and reached number 61 on the UK Singles Chart. Example was also asked to feature on Dizzee Rascal's song "Goin' Crazy", but declined the offer and Robbie Williams took the part instead.

In July 2013, it was announced that Example had signed a record deal with the UK division of Epic Records, after leaving his previous label Ministry of Sound. His final release with Ministry of Sound was the compilation album #Hits, released on 5 August 2013.

He appeared at the 2013 Glastonbury Festival. Example announced via Twitter that tracks from his upcoming album "All the Wrong Places" and "Only Human" were played at all festival gigs in the summer. "All the Wrong Places" made its radio debut on 15 July on BBC Radio 1 with Zane Lowe and was released on 8 September. It charted at number 13 on the UK Singles Chart. "Only Human" was first performed live at a pre-festival warm-up show at the O2 Academy Bristol on 6 June 2013.

At festivals during the summer, Example also performed the album track "Take Me As I Am", produced by Critikal. It was premiered at Global Gathering 2013. Example also wrote Friction featuring Arlissa's single "Long Gone Memory", which was released on 10 November 2013.

His fifth studio album Live Life Living was released on 7 July 2014. Example cited the Prodigy, Faithless, Underworld and the Chemical Brothers as influences for the new album. The album's second single, "Kids Again", premiered alongside its remixes in January 2014 and was released on 16 March. It was produced by Example and Fraser T Smith, and co-produced by Critikal.

In February and March 2014, Example hosted four Saturday night shows on Capital FM. Example also announced that throughout March 2014, he would release details including track list, pre-order information, album artwork and the title for his fifth album.

On 4 March, Example announced the title of his fifth album, Live Life Living. The album was released in the UK on 7 July 2014, and features twelve tracks, with an additional four on the deluxe edition. The album cover features a new logo, which debuted alongside the single artwork for "Kids Again".

On 19 April, Example debuted the album's third single, "One More Day (Stay with Me)", previously entitled "Stay with Me", which was renamed due to the Sam Smith song released by the same name. Example revisited five album tracks which initially just involved him singing and added raps to them. During the "One More Day" premiere with Danny Howard, he confirmed new collaborations with Klaxons, Wretch 32, Angel Haze and Sigma are in the works.

=== 2015–2019: Bangers & Ballads and standalone singles ===
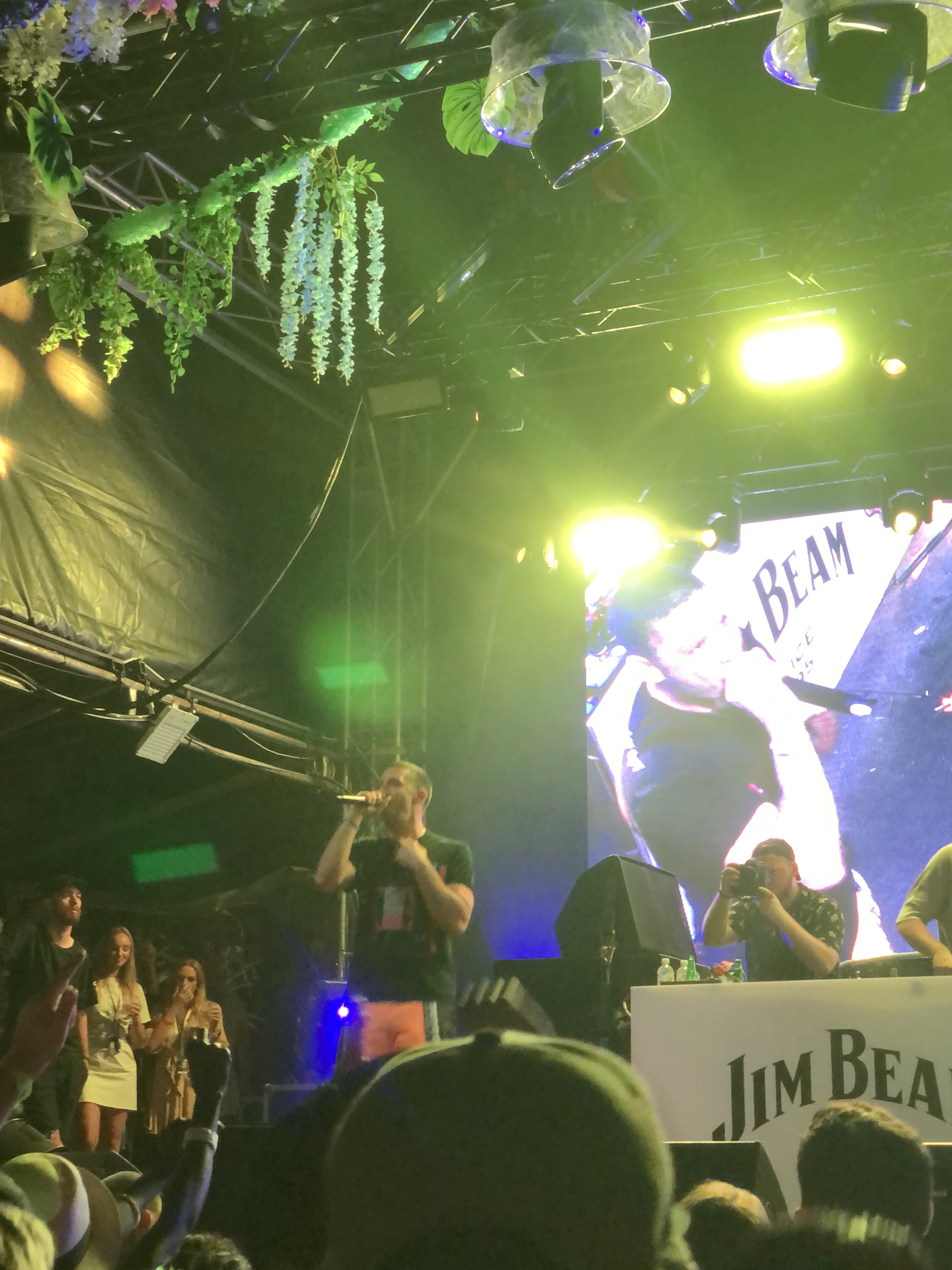
Example performing during the post-race concert at the Gold Coast 600 in 2019.

Prior to his 2014 tour, Example had confirmed to a fan on Twitter that work on his sixth album had begun, although he stated that it wouldn't likely be finished before the end of 2015. Example spent studio time with Netsky and Sigma leading up to his 2014 tour who could be possible collaborators for the album. In early 2015, Example released a statement on his Twitter account detailing his plans for the year ahead and the following year. The statement detailed that he would be taking a significant break from touring in 2015 in order to spend time with his then wife and son as well as to write new music for his upcoming album and, in 2016, he planned to release his sixth album and return to touring with a full live band. He also released a brief early demo snippet on Instagram, displaying part of a rap verse.

On 8 June, Example revealed on Twitter that "Whisky Story", the lead single from his sixth studio album, and its music video would be revealed on 8 July. The track was available to download on 10 July, and peaked only at number 96 in the Official UK charts.

In October 2015, Professor Green revealed that Example has collaborated with Takura, P Money and Big Narstie on a track called "Access Denied".

In May 2016, Example appeared in the music video for WSTRN's "Come Down". The same month, Example confirmed that the second single from his untitled sixth album would be "Later" and would be a return to "classic Example", citing "Changed the Way You Kissed Me" as a reference in an interview with Russell Kane on Virgin Radio.

On 7 December 2017 Example appeared on Shape's & Milli Major's MC edit of "Pogo Stick" alongside Grim Sickers and Majestic released on Four40 Records.

On 19 January 2018 Example released the single "The Answer". He left Columbia after both he and the label felt "frustrated" with the commercial performance of his latest singles.

Example announced the independent release of his 9-track mixtape Bangers & Ballads on 17 August 2018, which has been retroactively referred to as his sixth studio album. The first single, "Back for More" with Rude Kid, was released alongside the mixtape's pre-order opening on 3 August 2018, premiering a day before through Radio 1Xtra's MistaJam's radio show. The second single "Show Me How to Love" was premiered a week before the project's release date, on 10 August 2018 aong its music video directed by Risky Roadz. The third single from the mixtape "Sit Down Gary" was released alongside the mixtape on 17 August 2018.

On 30 November 2018, Example collabed with Darkzy's on their song "Drops" which was released on CRUCAST.

On 11 January 2019, Example released his new single "All Night". It peaked at No. 87 in the UK and at No. 26 on the UK Dance Chart. This marked Example's first appearance on the UK Singles Chart since his 2015 single "Whisky Story". He also stated on his Instagram and Twitter accounts that he would be releasing a new single every month.

On 17 January 2020, Example released the single "Back on the Wreck" on Heldeep Records, his first self-produced single he did not contribute vocals for.

=== 2020–present: Some Nights Last for Days and We May Grow Old But We Never Grow Up ===
On 20 April 2020, Example announced on his Instagram that the COVID-19 pandemic quarantine had allowed him to make music more frequently and announced that his seventh album would follow in mid-to-late May. Example stated that making the album was the most fun he had ever had writing music and suggested that it may be more hip-hop-oriented with numerous collaborations, stating "It's rap. It's hip-hop. I don't care what [...] you want to call it. All I can say is it's the purest, most effortless body of work I've ever made. [...] I've always played down my ability as a rapper [because] I never felt 'welcome to the party', but after this you're gonna know some levels." The first single, "Paperclips (Isolation Freestyle)" was released on 24 April and is a studio version of a freestyle rap he performed on Instagram Live a few weeks prior. He also revealed the album will also feature a track named "Erin", which serves as the album's second single, dedicated to his then wife Erin McNaught who also features on vocals. The track was released on 8 May, and the release of the album was announced five weeks later on 12 June. Example also revealed that the album included a track featuring Doc Brown and Sway. The album's title and cover art were revealed on 15 May, with the album's tracklist being revealed on 26 May.

In August 2021, Example signed an exclusive global recording deal with BMG.

That same month, he released "Every Single Time", the first single from his upcoming eighth album. It features singer-songwriter Lucy Lucy and record producer What So Not. The second single "Never Let You Down" followed in January 2022, a collaboration with Drum and bass producer Kanine featuring vocals from singer-songwriter Penny Ivy, he then released a song called 'Deep' featuring Nono in which they recorded the song while on tour in February 2022. The album, titled We May Grow Old But We Never Grow Up, was released on 17 June 2022.

On 22 June 2023, Example made another appearance at Glastonbury Festival in Somerset, UK.

In 2025, Example participated in the sixth series of The Masked Singer as "Bear". He was eliminated during the semi final alongside Natalie Cassidy as "Bush".

== Film making ==
While filming a promo video for his single "What We Made" in the abandoned city of Prypiat in northern Ukraine, Example also filmed an 18-minute documentary in the ghost towns that he visited, many of which still remain exactly as they were when they were abandoned after the Chernobyl disaster in 1986. He commented "I don't think anyone who's been here can be for nuclear power...I've read stuff recently about how we're only ever going to survive if we make nuclear power available, but you just think: why would you want it to happen after seeing this?"

Example made his feature film acting debut in Between Two Worlds, which he filmed a number of scenes for in 2013. His second appearance was in White Island, the film adaptation of the book A Bus Could Run You Over. His short film acting debut came in February 2016 in the form of Instagram-exclusive Shield 5, directed by Anthony Wilcox and starring alongside Christian Cooke.

== Personal life ==
Example is the nephew of the late footballer Tony Grealish.

Example was married to Australian model and actress Erin McNaught. They became engaged in November 2012 and married in Australia on 18 May 2013. On 23 July 2014, McNaught announced the news that she and Example were expecting a child. On 21 December 2014 their first son was born. On 12 September 2017, Example announced the birth of their second son. Example currently resides in Brisbane, Australia. In December 2019, Example obtained his residency visa and became a permanent resident of Australia. Example and McNaught announced they had split amicably in October 2022 after 11 years together. Example is currently in a relationship with English art advisor Daisy Cox. In September 2024, Example announced via his Instagram that he was expecting a child with Cox. Their son was born on 1 January 2025. In December 2025, Example announced that he and Cox are engaged.

Example is involved with charity work and is an ambassador for the Teenage Cancer Trust. In November 2013, he visited India with the Life Water charity on their "Drop4drop" campaign to introduce fresh water. Example and his then wife McNaught donated a water pump to a community in the Kadapa region.

Example is a supporter of Fulham F.C.

== Discography ==
- What We Made (2007)
- Won't Go Quietly (2010)
- Playing in the Shadows (2011)
- The Evolution of Man (2012)
- Live Life Living (2014)
- Bangers & Ballads (2018)
- Some Nights Last for Days (2020)
- We May Grow Old But We Never Grow Up (2022)

== Awards and nominations ==
List of awards and nominations
Year	Award	Category	Nominated work	Result
2008	UK Music Video Awards	Best Urban Video	"Me and Mandy"	Nominated
2008	UK Music Video Awards	Best Budget Video	"Me and Mandy"	Won
2009	UK Music Video Awards	Best Budget Video	"Hooligans"	Nominated
2010	UK Music Video Awards	Best Budget Video	"Watch the Sun Come Up"	Won
2010	Popjustice £20 Music Prize	Best British Pop Single	"Kickstarts"	Won
2011	Q Awards	Best Male Artist	Himself	Nominated
2011	BT Digital Music Awards	Best Male Artist	Himself	Nominated
2011	BT Digital Music Awards	Best Independent Artist or Group	Himself	Nominated
2011	4Music Video Honours	Best Boy	Himself	Nominated
2011	4Music Video Honours	Best Video	"Stay Awake"	Nominated
2011	4Music Video Honours	Best Video	"Changed the Way You Kiss Me"	Nominated
2012	BRIT Awards	Best British Single	"Changed the Way You Kiss Me"	Nominated
2012	NME Awards	Best Band Blog or Twitter	Himself	Nominated
2013	Hungarian Music Awards	Foreign Electronic Music Production of the Year	Himself	Won
