= Coliseu dos Recreios =

Multi-purpose auditiorium in Lisbon, Portugal

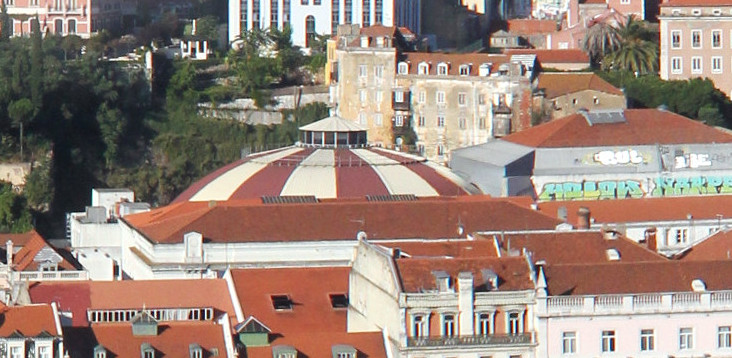
- Interactive map of Coliseu dos Recreios
- Address: Rua das Portas de Santo Antão 96; 1150-269 Lisbon Portugal
- Location: Arroios
- Owner: Património Cultural
- Capacity: 4,300
- Public transit: Restauradores; Rossio

Construction
- Groundbreaking: 1888
- Opened: 14 August 1890
- Renovated: 1992–94
- Architect: Cesare Ianz
- Project manager: Manuel Garcia Júnior
- Structural engineers: Francisco Goulard; Frederico Ressano Garcia; M. Gouveia Júnior; Xavier Cordeiro
- General contractor: Castanheira das Neves

Website
- Venue Website
- Building details

Renovating team
- Architects: Maurício de Vasconcelos; João Gomes
- Civil engineer: Grupo Betar
- Other designers: Daciano da Costa
- Main contractor: Teixeira Duarte

The Coliseu dos Recreios (also known as Coliseu de Lisboa) is a multi-purpose auditorium located in Lisbon, Portugal.

== History ==
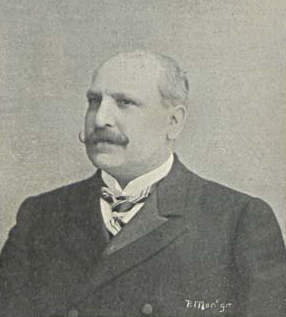
António Santos Júnior

The main building was constructed within a metal lattice by Francisco Goulard between 1888 and 1890. While the facade was completed by Cesare Ianz. The building was inaugurated on 14 August 1890. In 1897 the Geographical Society of Lisbon (Portuguese: Sociedade de Geografia de Lisboa) occupied part of the spaces, inaugurating the Portuguese Hall (Portuguese: Sala Portugal), authored by architect José Luís Monteiro (1849–1942) shortly after. António Santos Júnior became director general of the Coliseu dos Recreios in the same year.

On the death of António Santos (1920), the direction of the Coliseu was assumed by Ricardo Covões.

The spectre of António Santos is rumored to have haunted the Coliseum until a major refurbishment of the installations was completed in February 1994, that included remodelling of the hall and stage, and reconstruction of the surrounding spaces.

On 22 August 2006, the Coliseu (owing to its stylistic, typological and historic importance) was designated for preservation. The DRCLisboa, on establishing the Special Protection Zone for the Castle of São Jorge (and surroundings), included the building. As a Property of Public Interest, the National Council for Culture (Portuguese: Conselho Nacional de Cultura) proposed that archiving of the Special Protection Zone on 10 October 2011, which were necessitated on 18 October 2011 by IGESPAR.

== Architecture ==
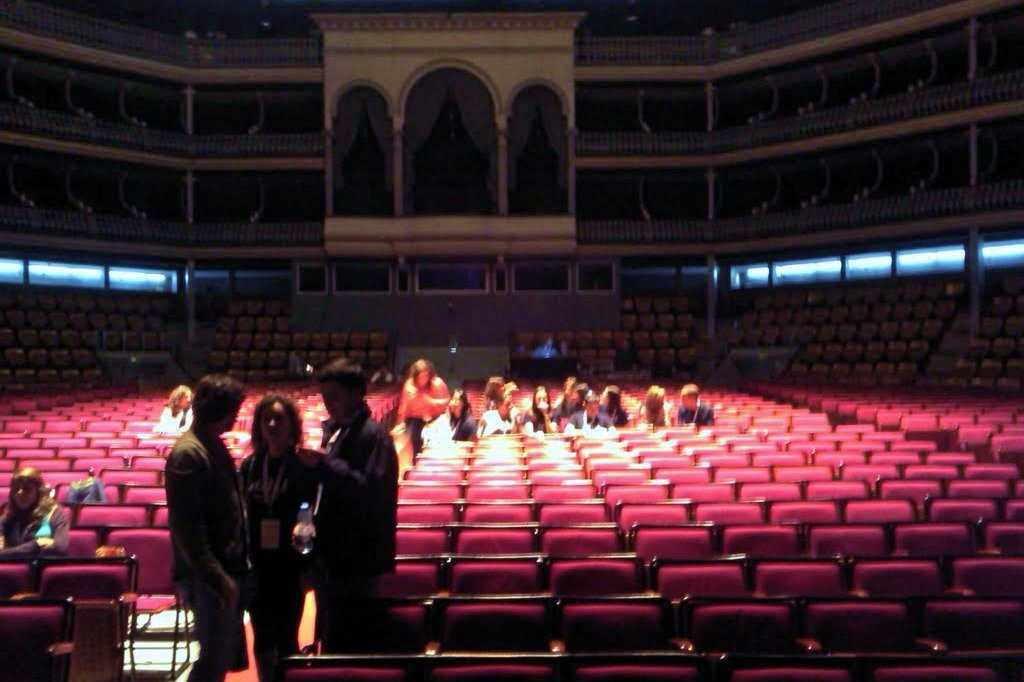
A view of the interior of the events hall of the Coliseu dos Recreios

The Coliseu is actually two juxtapositioned buildings. This includes a rectangular three-story building, whose principal facade is oriented to the southwest. The first floor includes the Coliseu dos Recreios' atrium (94-98), the vestibule and bar-restaurant of the Sociedade de Geografia; the second floor, which as functions as library of the organization; and third floor, the Sala Portugal. The rectangular area is internally divided into three areas supported by steel pillars/columns, and interlinked by steel staircase, allowing circulation vertically. The twelve-sided events hall is encircled by seating and two floors of box seating. To the northeast and southwest, respectively, are special box seats, framed by three arches, over one of the three accesses. The hall is covered by metal ceiling, supported by steel tubing.

The events hall has a capacity of between 2.846 (seated) to 5.672 people, depending on its configuration.

Beside concerts, other shows are hosted there, including theatre, circus, dance shows and awards ceremonies. Performers have included Cirque du Soleil, Tango Fire, and several ballets.

== Noted performers ==
- Agir
- Alter Bridge
- Amália Rodrigues
- Amor Electro
- Ana Moura
- Anastacia
- Anselmo Ralph
- Aurea
- Biffy Clyro
- Buika
- Bring Me the Horizon
- Bush
- Caetano Veloso
- Camané
- Carlos do Carmo
- Carminho
- Carolina Deslandes
- Celeste Rodrigues
- Cesária Évora
- Cuca Roseta
- D.A.M.A
- Da Weasel
- Dead Combo
- Deep Purple
- Deolinda
- Diana Krall
- Dino d'Santiago
- Diogo Piçarra
- Dream Theater
- Duran Duran
- Extreme
- Fafá de Belém
- Gabriela Rocha
- Gavin James
- Gilberto Gil
- Gregory Porter
- Guano Apes
- Gusttavo Lima
- Harlem Gospel Choir
- Imagine Dragons
- Jamie Cullum
- João Gilberto
- João Pedro Pais
- Jorge Palma
- José Cid
- Kevinho
- King Gizzard & the Lizard Wizard
- LCD Soundsystem
- Léo Magalhães
- Machine Head
- Madonna
- Mallu Magalhães
- Marco Paulo
- Maria Bethânia
- Maria Lisboa
- Marisa Monte
- Mariza
- Martinho da Vila
- Massive Attack
- Matias Damásio
- Michel Teló
- Miguel Araújo
- Mika
- Miles Davis
- Mishlawi
- Moonspell
- My Chemical Romance
- Niall Horan
- Nightwish
- Nine Inch Nails
- Norah Jones
- Os Azeitonas
- Pablo Alborán
- Papa Roach
- Paula Fernandes
- Pentatonix
- Placebo
- Plutónio
- Prince
- Radiohead
- Raquel Tavares
- Richie Campbell
- Rise Against
- R5
- Salvador Sobral
- Sam the Kid
- Scott Bradlee's Postmodern Jukebox
- Silence 4
- Simple Minds
- Simple Plan
- Sum 41
- The Flying Aces
- The Gift
- The National
- Tiago Bettencourt
- Tate McRae
- Vanessa da Mata
- Woody Allen
- Xutos & Pontapés
- Yes

== See also ==
- List of theatres and auditoriums in Lisbon
