= Don't Know Why (SoundGirl song) =

Single by SoundGirl
- Released: 19 June 2011
- Recorded: 2010
- Genre: Pop
- Length: 3:22 (Radio Edit)
- Label: Mercury Records
- Songwriters: Isobel Beardshaw, Miranda Cooper, Bernard Edwards, Olivia Redmond, Nile Rodgers, Nicole Shortland, Ant Whiting

SoundGirl singles chronology
"I'm the Fool" (2011)	"Don't Know Why" (2011)

"Don't Know Why" is the debut single by British London-based trio SoundGirl from their shelved debut studio album. The single was released on 19 June 2011 as a digital download in the United Kingdom. The official remix features teen rapper Mann.

== Music video ==
A music video to accompany the release of "Don't Know Why" was first released onto YouTube on 27 April 2011, at a total length of three minutes and forty-six seconds.

== Track listing ==
Digital download
No.	Title	Length
1.	"Don't Know Why" (feat. Mann)	3:21
2.	"Don't Know Why" (Ian Carey Club Remix)	5:03
3.	"Don't Know Why" (South Rakkas Crew Remix)	4:29
4.	"Don't Know Why" (Mike Delinquent Mix)	4:13
5.	"Don't Know Why" (Radio Edit)	3:22
6.	"Don't Know Why" (Music Video)	3:45

== Chart performance ==
Chart (2011)	Peak position
Belgium (Ultratip Bubbling Under Flanders)	11
Belgium (Ultratip Bubbling Under Wallonia)	21
UK Singles (The Official Charts Company)	45

== Release history ==
Region	Date	Format	Label
United Kingdom	19 June 2011	Digital download	Mercury Records

== Origins ==
"Don't Know Why" is based on the track "Why (Does Your Love Hurt So Much)" by Natasha Thomas, which was released in 2003 by Epic Records and is in turn based on Carly Simon's 1982 single "Why". The SoundGirl and Natasha Thomas tracks both build on the success of the signature reggae/pop sound of Ace of Base.
