= Estádio José Alvalade =

Football stadium in Lisbon, Portugal

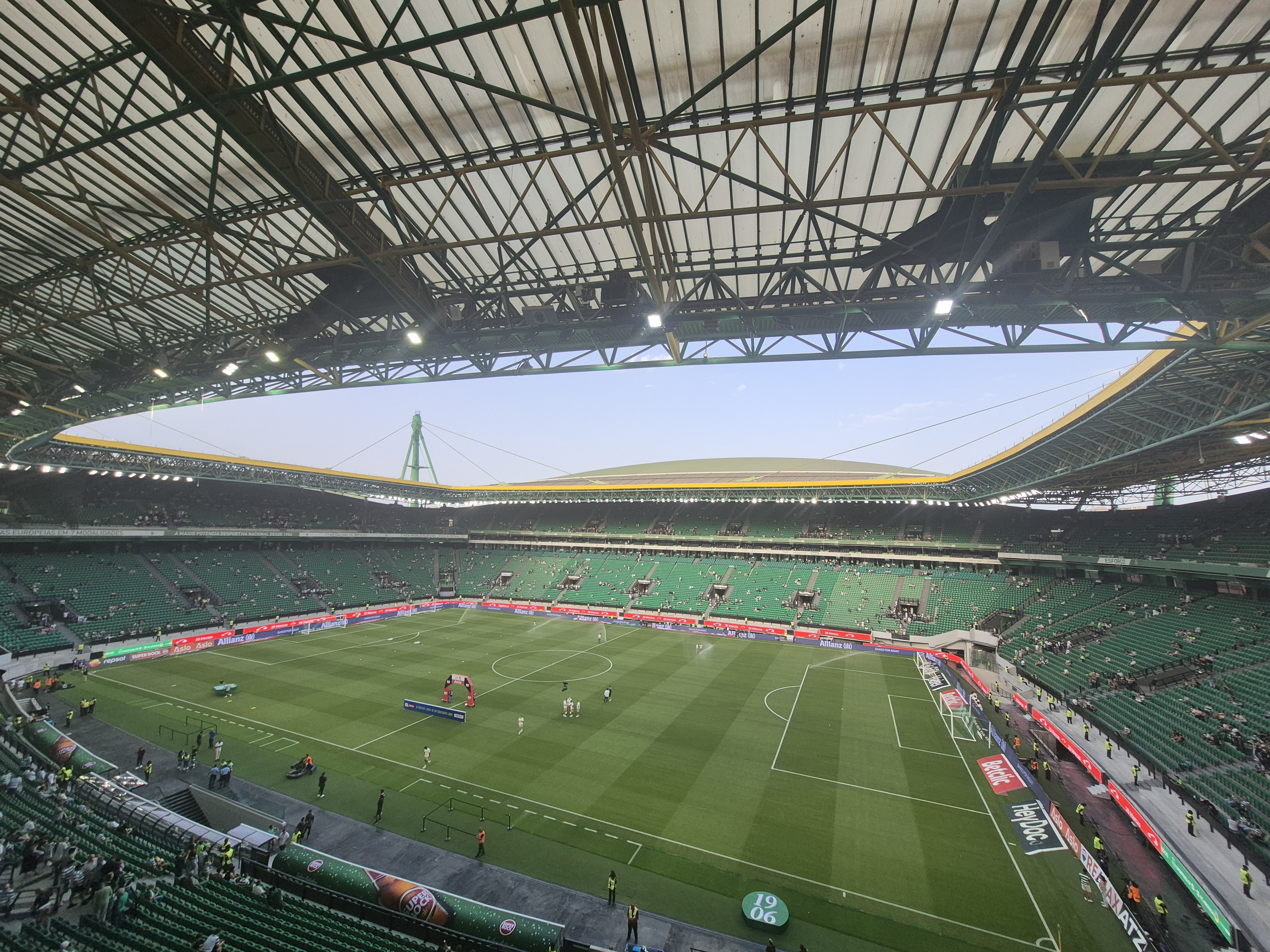
- UEFA
- Interactive map of Estádio José Alvalade
- Full name: Estádio José Alvalade
- Location: Lisbon, Portugal
- Coordinates: 38°45′40″N 9°9′39″W
- Owner: Sporting CP
- Capacity: 52,095
- Surface: Grass
- Record attendance: 51,470 (19 April 2026); Sporting CP 1–2 S.L.Benfica
- Field size: 105 x 68 m
- Public transit: Verde Amarela at Campo Grande

Construction
- Groundbreaking: 15 January 2001; 25 years ago
- Built: 2001–2003
- Opened: 6 August 2003; 23 years ago
- Cost: €184 million
- Architect: Tomás Taveira

Tenants
- Sporting CP (2003–present); Portugal national football team (selected matches)

Website
- sporting.pt

The Estádio José Alvalade (Portuguese pronunciation: [ɨʃˈtaðju ʒuˈzɛ alvɐˈlaðɨ]; English: José Alvalade Stadium) is a football stadium in Lisbon, Portugal, and is the home of Sporting CP. It was built adjacent to the site of the older stadium. The stadium is named after José Alvalade (1885–1918), the founder and first club member of Sporting CP in the early 20th century.

== Origin ==
The previous José Alvalade Stadium was opened on 10 June 1956. Plans by Sporting CP to modernize the club in the late 1990s coincided with the decision to award Portugal the right to host UEFA Euro 2004, but the decision to build a new stadium was made before. The construction began on 15 January 2001. The club's statutes dictated that the stadium would be called Estádio José Alvalade. It would be the club's seventh stadium.

== History ==
The stadium is the center of a complex called Alvalade XXI, designed by Portuguese architect Tomás Taveira, which includes a mall called Alvaláxia with a 12-screen movie theater, a health club, the club's museum, a sports pavilion, a clinic, and an office building. The new Alvalade stadium cost €184 million to build, around €80 million more than originally planned, of which €17,907,915 was supported from the Portuguese state. On the exterior, the stadium featured multicoloured tiles which were later removed. In 2021, Sporting CP announced that it would change the colour of the seats in the multicoloured stands of Estádio José Alvalade to green (the main colour of the sports club). The colour change was completed in 2022. Originally, the seats were arranged in a random-looking mosaic of mixed colours, however during its second decade of use these were all gradually changed to dark green, with the roof support towers and access stairways, initially bright yellow, also repainted green in 2011.

Although it eventually received a fifth star becoming a UEFA five-star stadium, it was initially classified by UEFA as a four-star stadium. The stadium – originally projected to hold 42,000 spectators at any given time – has a capacity of 50,095 and was acoustically engineered as a venue for major concerts. The stadium has also a total of 1,315 underground parking spaces, including 30 for disabled spectators.

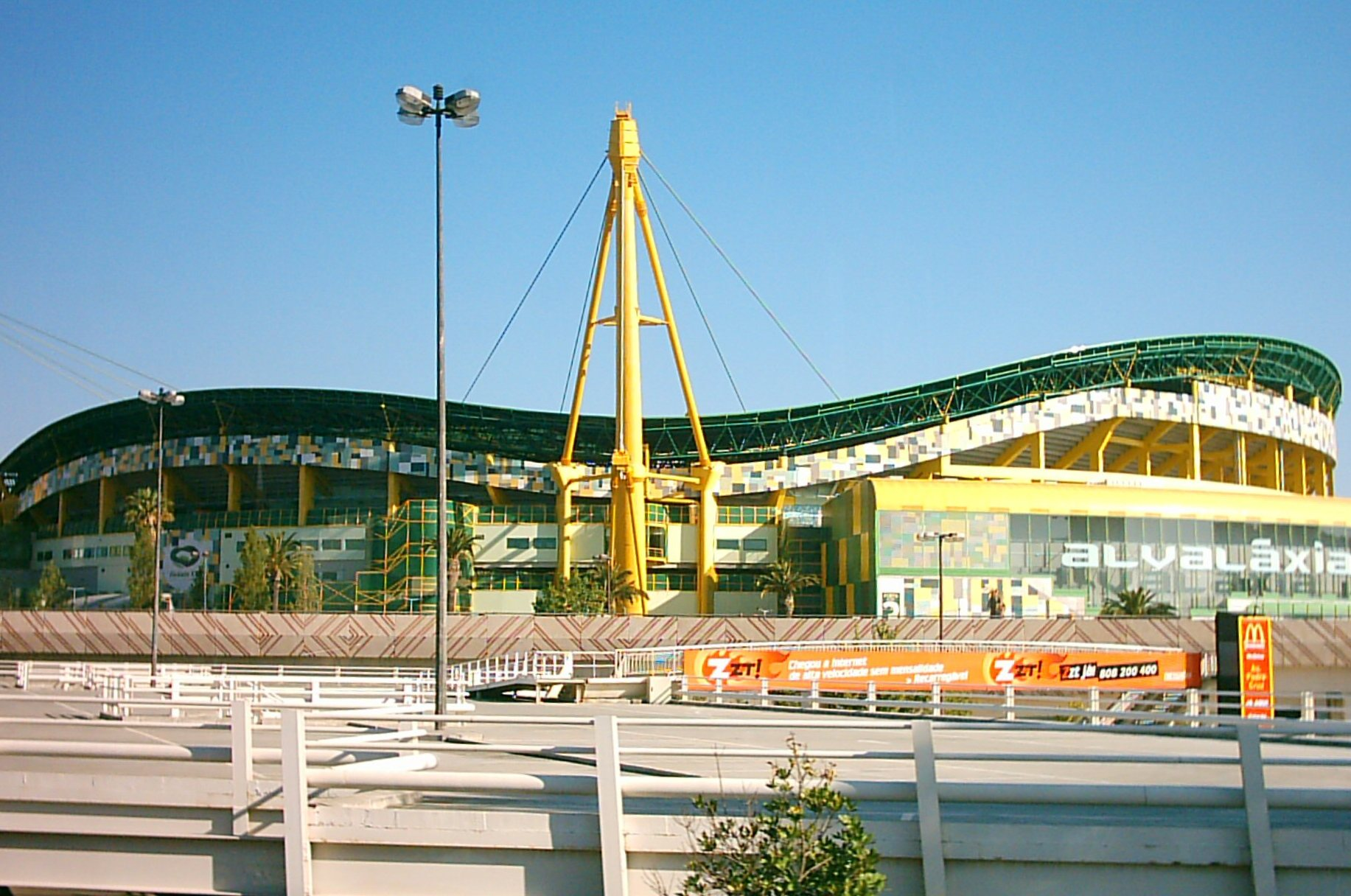
Estádio José Alvalade, Lisbon.

The new stadium official opening was on 6 August 2003 when Sporting played and beat Manchester United 3–1. Luís Filipe scored the first-ever goal at the new Estádio José Alvalade in that friendly win against Manchester United, playing alongside Sporting's teammate Cristiano Ronaldo, then aged 18, who made his last appearance for the club on that same day.

The stadium hosted five matches of UEFA Euro 2004, one of them being the semi-final between Portugal and the Netherlands, which Portugal won 2–1. In May 2005, the stadium was upgraded to five-star stadium status by UEFA, the same month it hosted the 2005 UEFA Cup Final between Sporting and CSKA Moscow, which CSKA Moscow won 3–1.

It hosted quarter-finals and semi-finals matches during the 2019–20 UEFA Champions League.

On May 24, 2025, it hosted the 2025 UEFA Women's Champions League final.

The stadium is one of the potential venues for the 2030 FIFA World Cup, which Portugal will co-host along with Morocco and Spain.

=== Renovation ===
The stadium has been undergoing minor renovations since 2021. However, the major and most anticipated project, the removal of the moat, was completed in time for the start of the 2025–26 season in 2025, allowing for the addition of 2,000 additional seats. Other significant improvements included the removal of the original video screens, which will be replaced by new LED panels on the balconies dividing the stadium rings, freeing up additional seats and new Exclusive Access Lounges with access to a bar and diverse gourmet dining experiences. With the completed work, capacity increased to 52,095 seats.

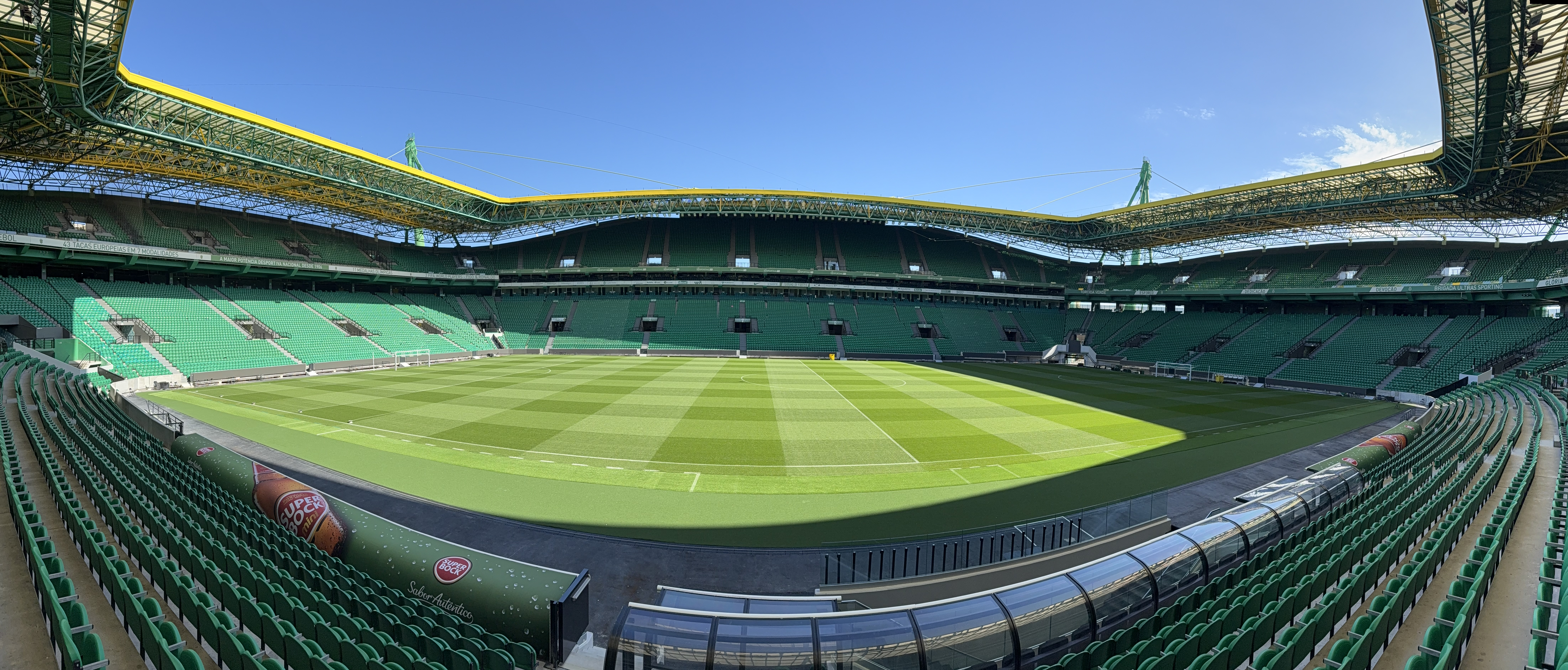
A panorama of the Estádio José Alvalade on 27 October 2025

== International matches ==
=== Portugal national team matches ===
The following national team matches were held in the stadium.

#	Date	Score	Opponent	Competition	Attendance
1.	20 June 2004	1–0	Spain	Euro 2004 Group Stage	47,491
2.	30 June 2004	2–1	Netherlands	Euro 2004 Semi-Finals	46,679
3.	13 October 2004	7–1	Russia	2006 World Cup qualification	44,258
4.	24 March 2007	4–0	Belgium	Euro 2008 qualifying	48,009
5.	12 September 2007	1–1	Serbia	Euro 2008 qualifying	47,000
6.	10 September 2008	2–3	Denmark	2010 World Cup qualification	33,406
7.	11 October 2013	1–1	Israel	2014 World Cup qualification	48,317
8.	4 September 2015	0–1	France	Friendly	39,853
9.	12 October 2019	3–0	Luxembourg	Euro 2020 qualifying	47,308
10.	7 October 2020	0–0	Spain	Friendly	2,500
11.	14 October 2020	3–0	Sweden	2020–21 UEFA Nations League	5,000
12.	9 June 2021	4–0	Israel	Friendly	0
13.	5 June 2022	4–0	Switzerland	2022–23 UEFA Nations League	42,325
14.	9 June 2022	2–0	Czech Republic	2022–23 UEFA Nations League	44,100
15.	17 November 2022	4–0	Nigeria	Friendly	43,621
16.	23 March 2023	4–0	Liechtenstein	Euro 2024 qualifying	45,378
17.	19 November 2023	2–0	Iceland	Euro 2024 qualifying	45,655
18.	4 June 2024	4–2	Finland	Friendly	43,125
19.	23 March 2025	5–2	Denmark	2024–25 UEFA Nations League	47,123
20.	11 October 2025	1–0	Republic of Ireland	2026 World Cup Qualification	48,821
21.	14 October 2025	2–2	Hungary	2026 World Cup Qualification	47,854
22.	24 September 2026	1–0	Wales	2026–27 UEFA Nations League	47,725

=== UEFA Euro 2004 ===
Date	Team #1	Score	Team #2	Round	Attendance
14 June 2004	Sweden	5–0	Bulgaria	Group C	31,652
20 June 2004	Spain	0–1	Portugal	Group A	47,491
23 June 2004	Germany	1–2	Czech Republic	Group D	46,849
25 June 2004	France	0–1	Greece	Quarter-finals	45,390
30 June 2004	Portugal	2–1	Netherlands	Semi-finals	46,679

== Notable matches ==
=== First match ===
Date	Team #1	Score	Team #2	Attendance
6 August 2003	(Portugal) Sporting CP	3–1	(England) Manchester United	49,992

=== 2005 UEFA Cup Final ===
Date	Team #1	Score	Team #2	Attendance
18 May 2005	(Portugal) Sporting CP	1–3	(Russia) CSKA Moscow	47,085

=== 2025 UEFA Women's Champions League Final ===
Date	Team #1	Score	Team #2	Attendance
24 May 2025	(England) Arsenal WFC	1–0	(Spain) Barcelona Femení	38,856

== Concerts ==
The former Estádio José Alvalade was known in its later decades as the "Cathedral of Rock", as the ground served as host to some of the world's biggest music stars in their stadium tours and concerts in Portugal and last served this purpose in its very last function on 28 June 2003 for the Galp ao Vivo festival, just months before the new stadium was set to be inaugurated. The stadium, which had been designed with acoustics in mind as previously referred, was expected to pick up the mantle, despite the changing landscape of the Portuguese and Lisbon concert landscape, particularly with the inauguration of Pavilhão Atlântico (now MEO Arena) in 1998.

Nonetheless, during its first few years it continued to stage several renowned artists, albeit sporadically. In 2009, Sporting's board decided to end the use of Alvalade as a venue for music namely due to the damage to the pitch it caused and how it impacted players performance, making AC/DC the last artist to use the venue at that point. In July 2026, after seventeen years, Sporting announced the return of Alvalade to the music scene with a concert by luso-mozambican rapper Plutónio set to play the following June.

Concerts hosted at Estádio José Alvalade
Date	Artist	Event	Notes
3 July 2004	Phil Collins; Opening act: Mike and the Mechanics	First Final Farewell Tour [de]	
14 July 2005	U2; Opening act: Kaiser Chiefs	Vertigo Tour	
25 June 2007	Rolling Stones; Opening act: Jet	A Bigger Bang Tour	
3 June 2009	AC/DC; Opening acts: The Vicious Five, Mundo Cão [pt]	Black Ice Tour	
5 June 2027	Plutónio	self-titled	Future event

== Transport ==
The Stadium is served by the Campo Grande station of the Lisbon Metro and a bus terminal served by several companies. The Segunda Circular, a major ring road of Lisbon, runs close by and the stadium can be reached via the exit Estádio de Alvalade. There are several car parks around the stadium.

It is a relatively short distance (3 km) from the Estádio da Luz, homeground of rivals Benfica.

== Gallery ==
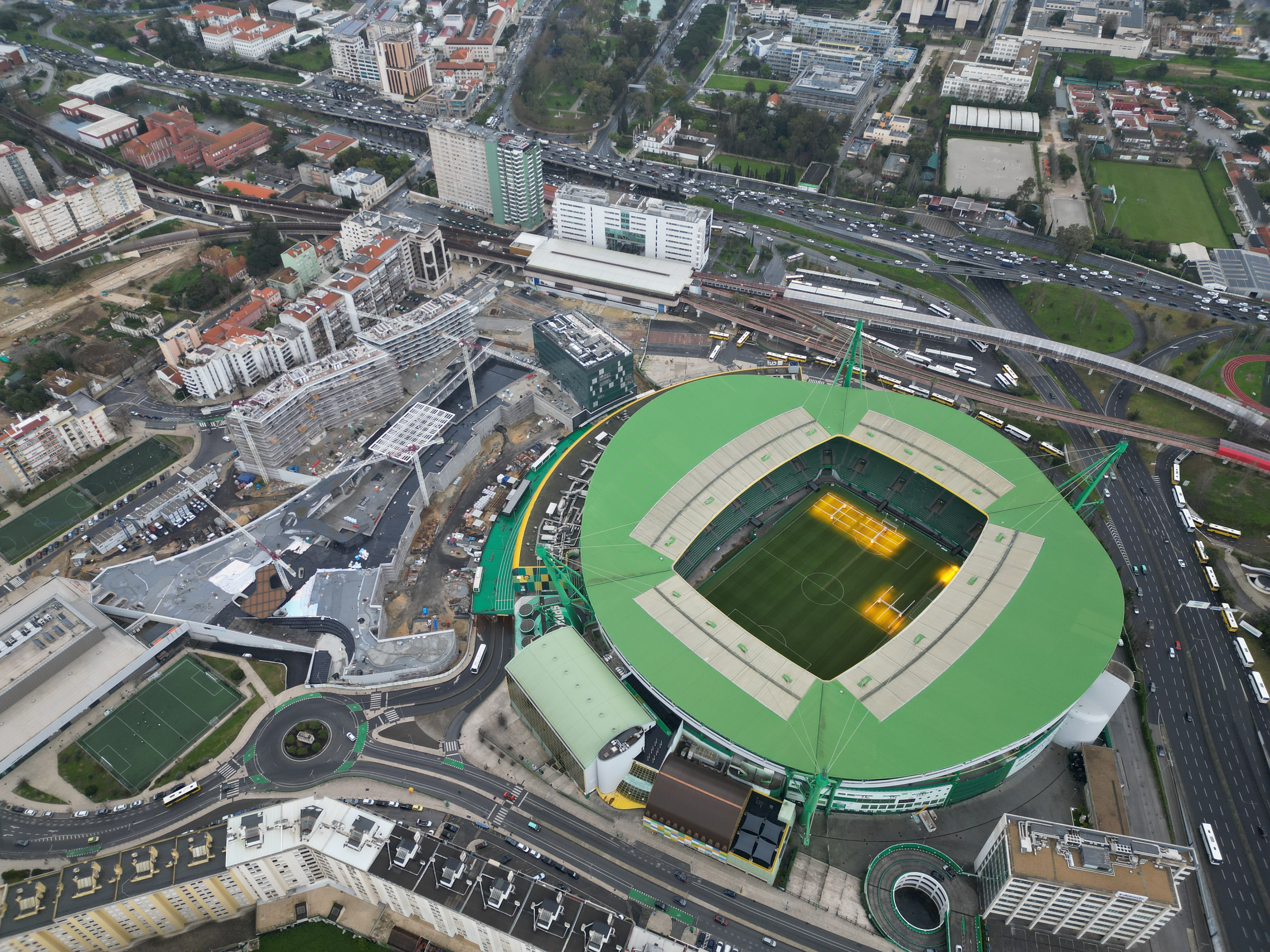
Aerial view (2025)

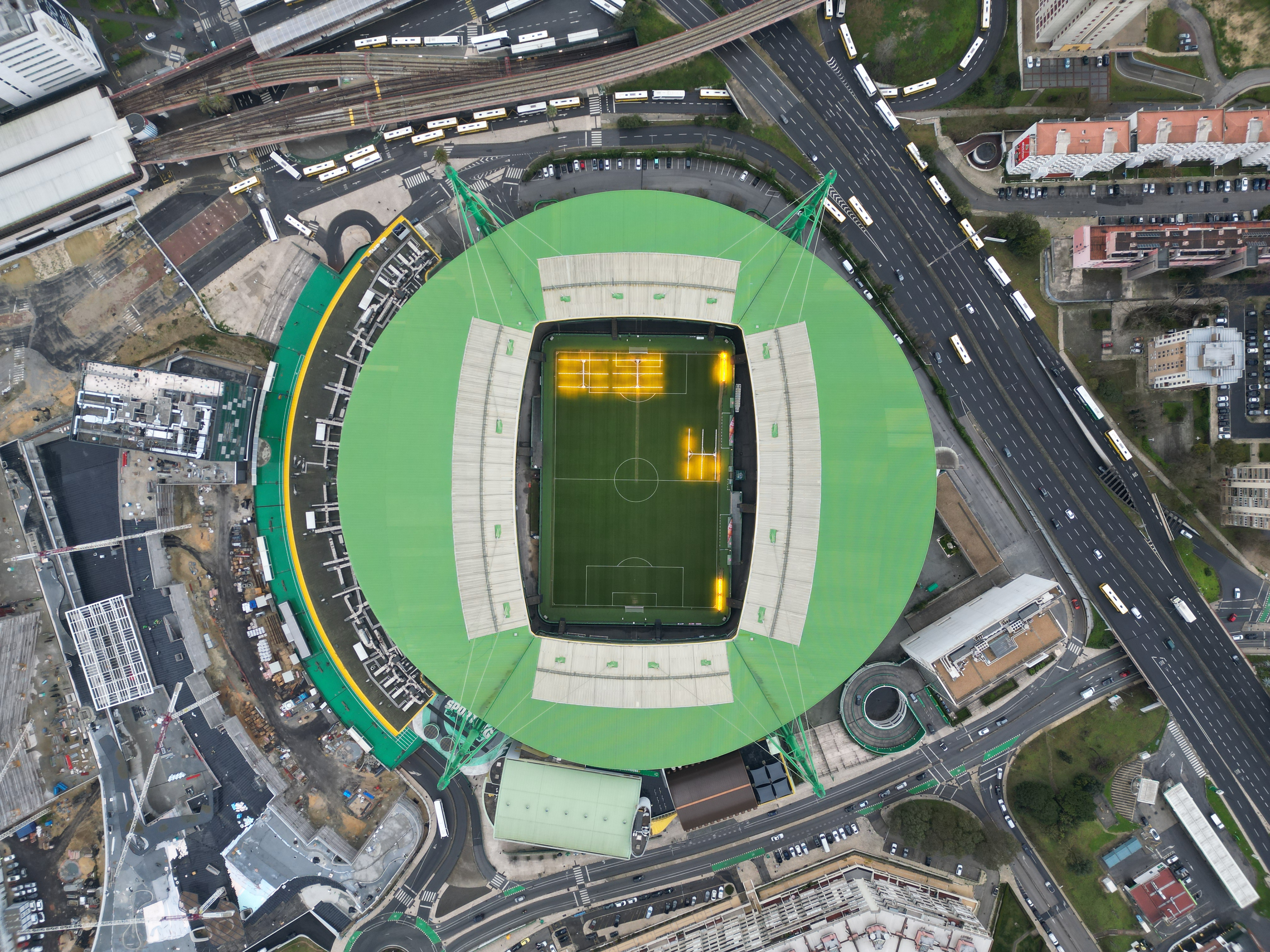
Top view (2025)

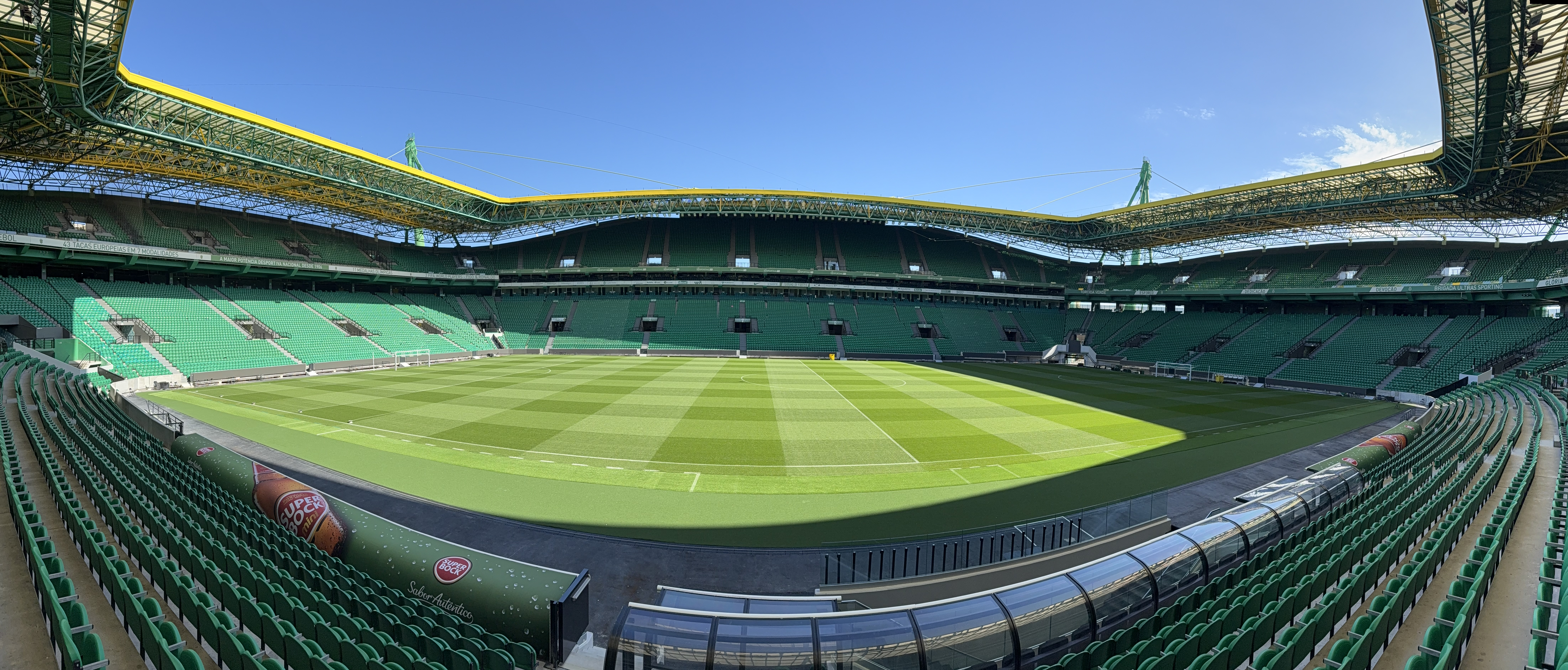
Panoramic View (2025)

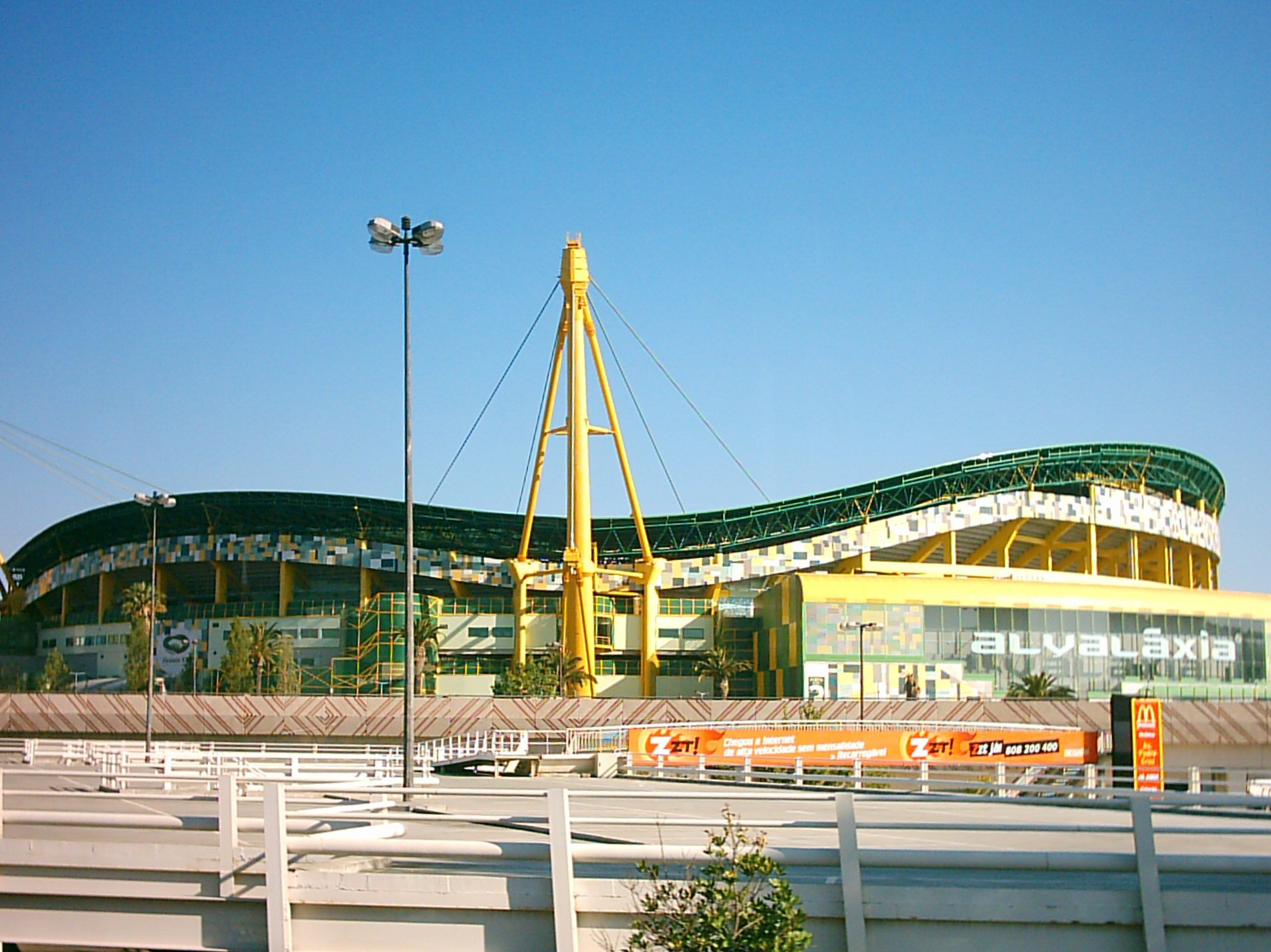

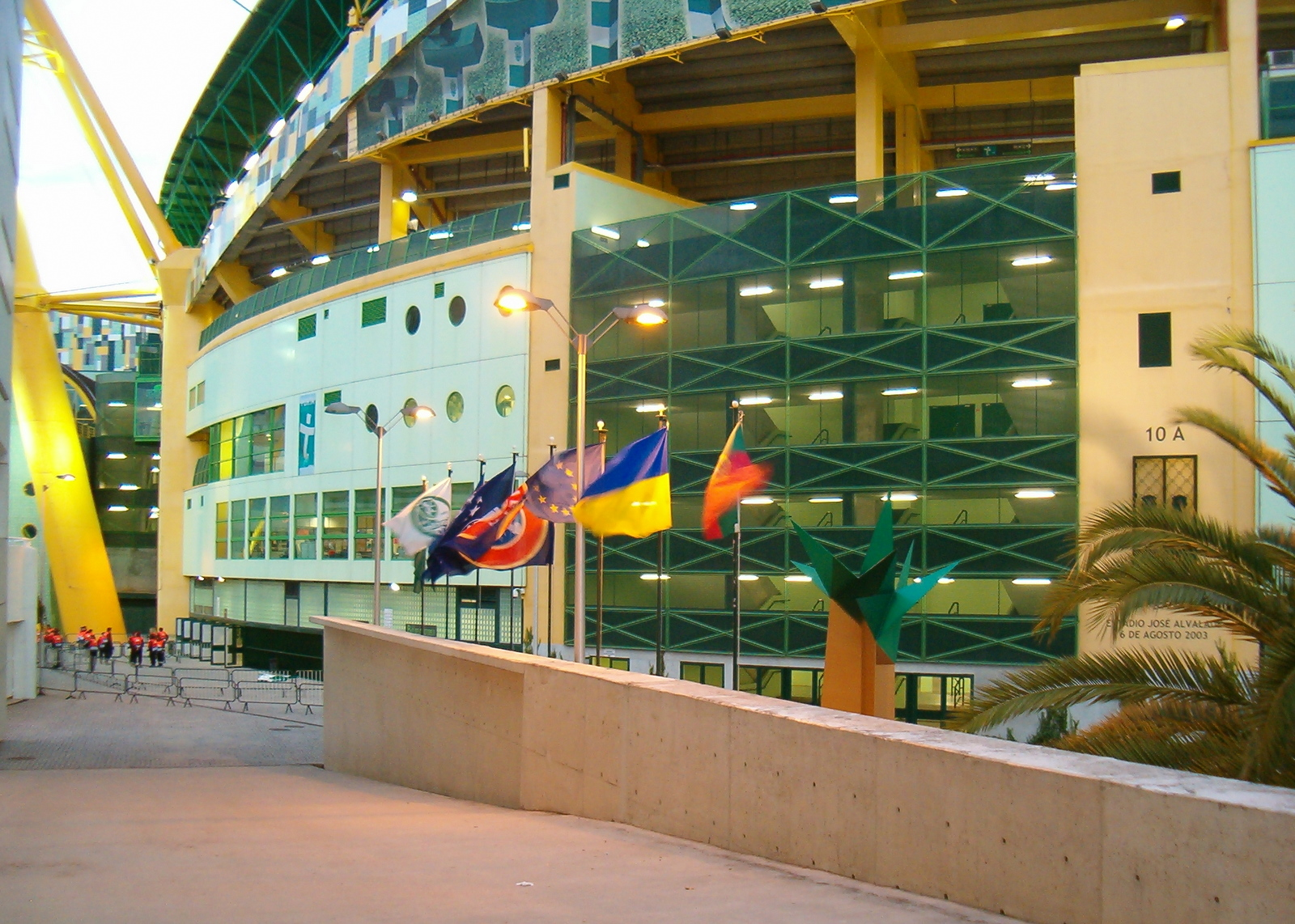

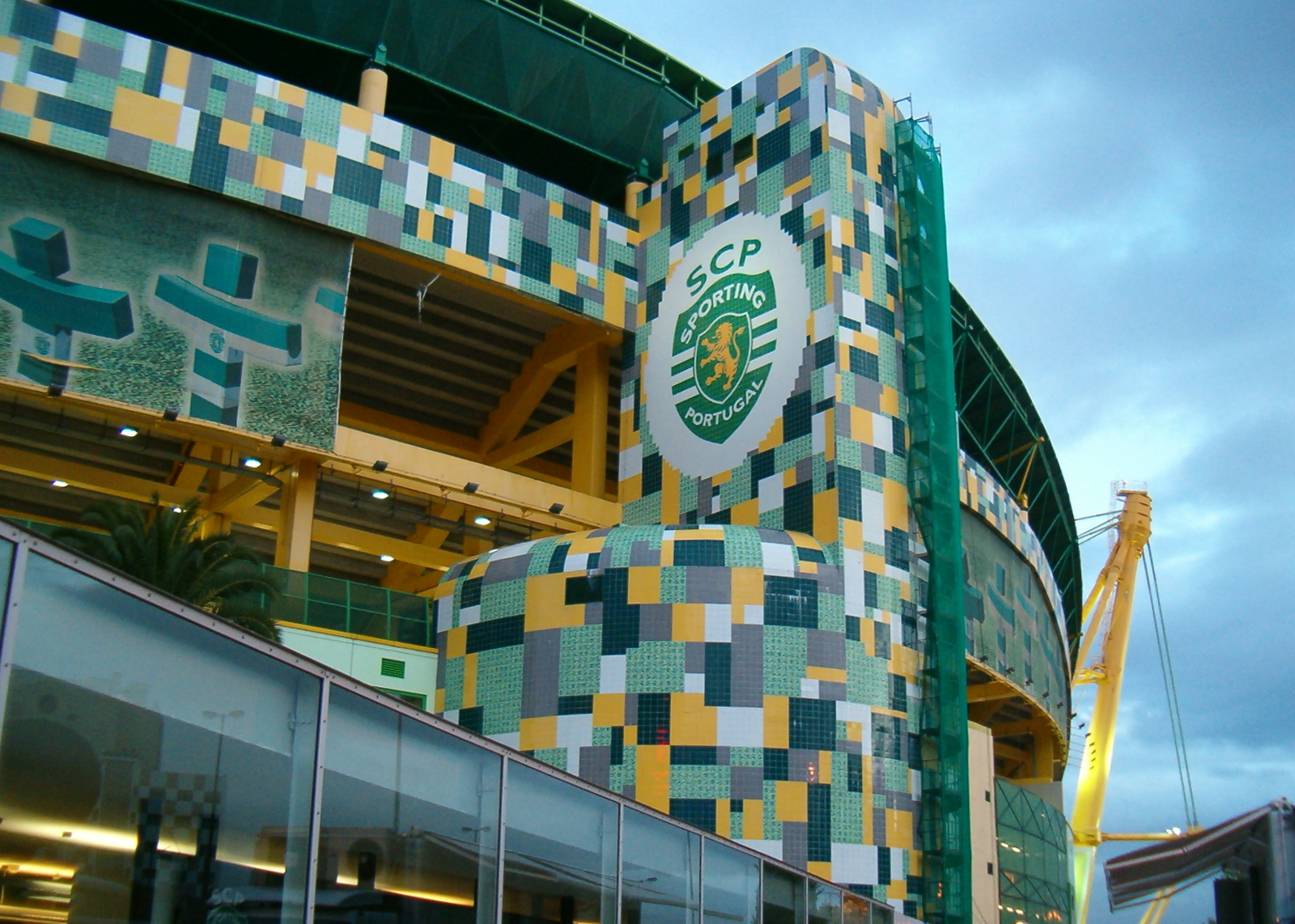

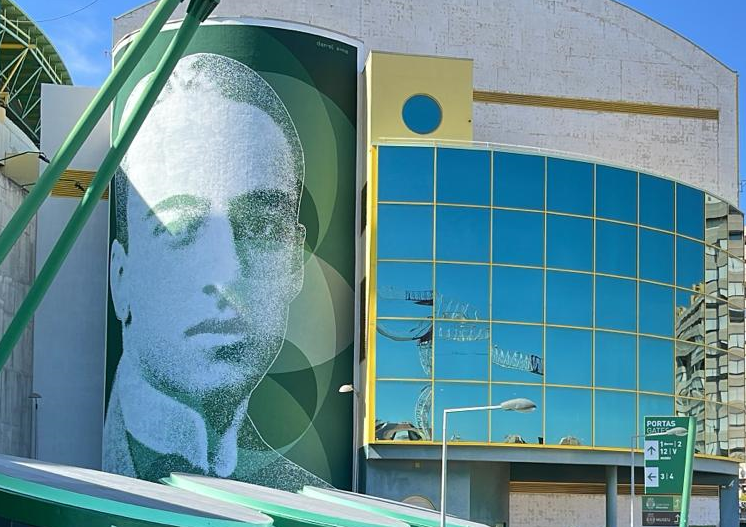
Facade

Preceded by Ullevi; Gothenburg	UEFA Cup; Final venue 2005	Succeeded by Philips Stadion; Eindhoven
