= Watch the Ride =

Watch the Ride may refer to:

- Watch the Ride (Zinc album), 2007
- Watch the Ride, a 2008 album by TC (musician)
- Watch the Ride, a 2008 album by High Contrast
- Watch the Ride, a 2008 album by Goldie
- Watch the Ride, a 2008 album by Skream
