= Break Free (band) =

Break Free - Queen Tribute Show
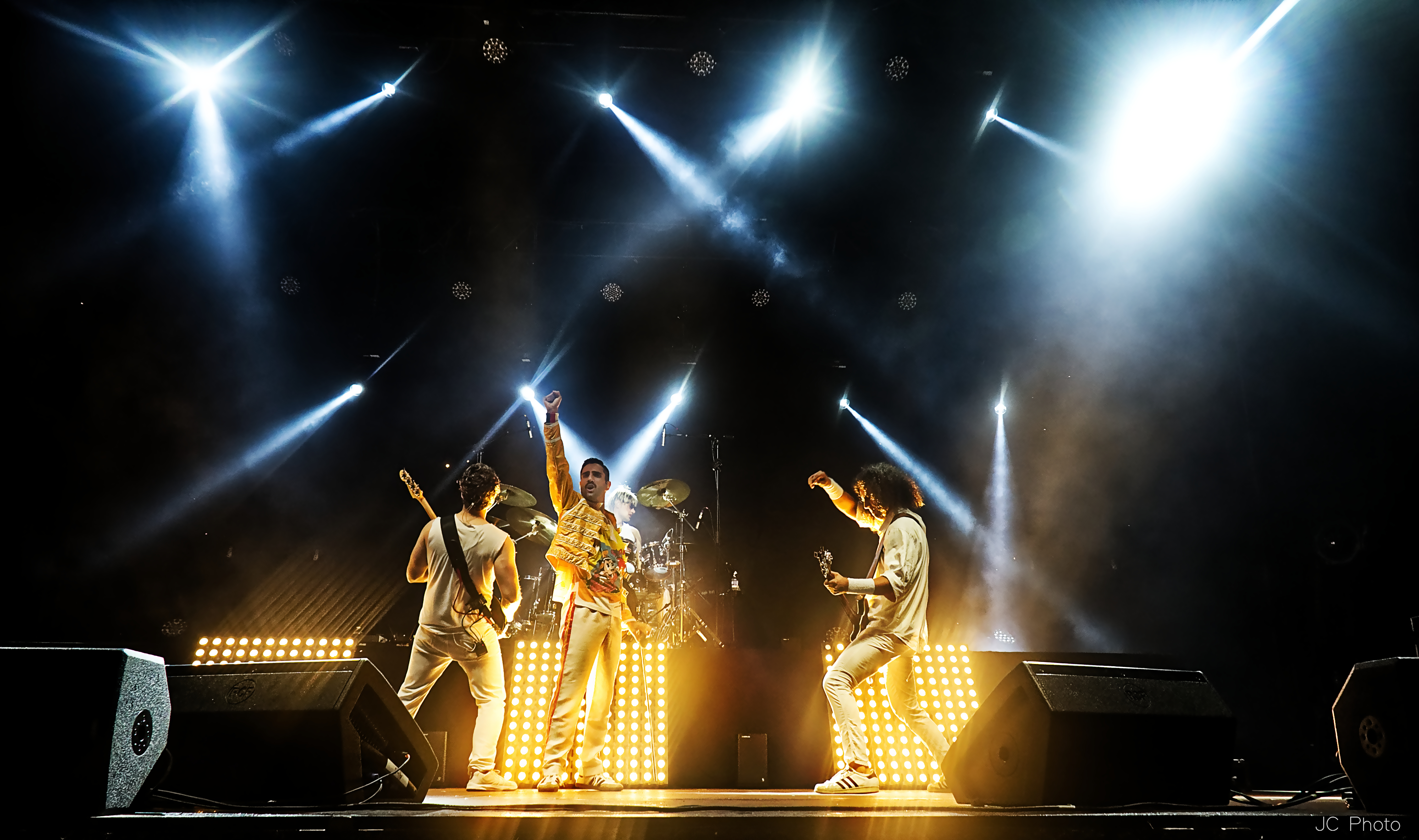
- Break Free live in 2021

Background information
- Origin: Vicenza - Italy
- Years active: 2015 - present
- Website: www.breakfreeshow.com

Break Free is a European Queen tribute band formed in Italy in 2015. The band consists of conservatory-trained musicians recreating Queen's costumes and choreography on stage.

The band takes their name from Queen's single "I Want to Break Free".

== Band members ==
The band's founding members are Giuseppe Malinconico (vocals, piano), Federico Kim Marino (drums, vocals) and Sebastiano Zanotto (bass). Paolo Barbieri (guitar and vocals) joined the band in 2016.

Before forming Break Free, Malinconico and Marino had played together in the progressive metal band Mugaen. Zanotto was a coworker at the music school where Malinconico and Marino taught, while Barbieri was introduced to the band after returning from three years working as a session musician in Egypt.

== Touring ==
Break Free has performed at venues and events including the Palau de la Música Catalana (Barcelona, Spain), Coliseu dos Recreios (Lisboa, Portugal), Gruvillage Festival (Turin Italy), Altice Arena (Lisboa, Portugal), Münchner Residenz (Munich, Germany), MotoGP Red Bull Ring (Spielberg, Austria), Euskalduna Conference Centre and Concert Hall (Bilbao, Spain) and Tall Ships Races (Tallinn, Estonia).

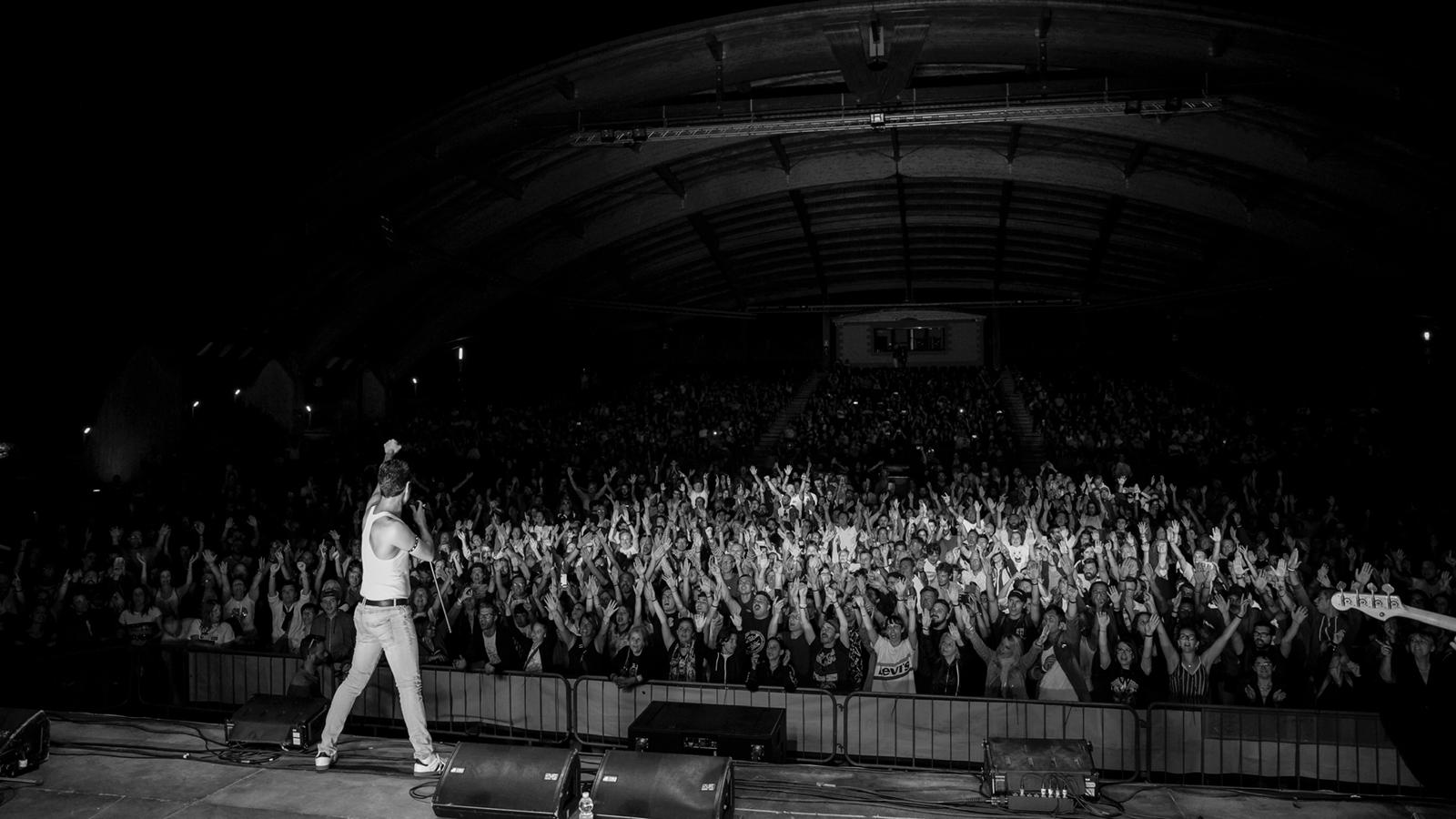

The band has performed more than 200 concerts.

== Show ==
The band performs the music of the British rock band Queen.

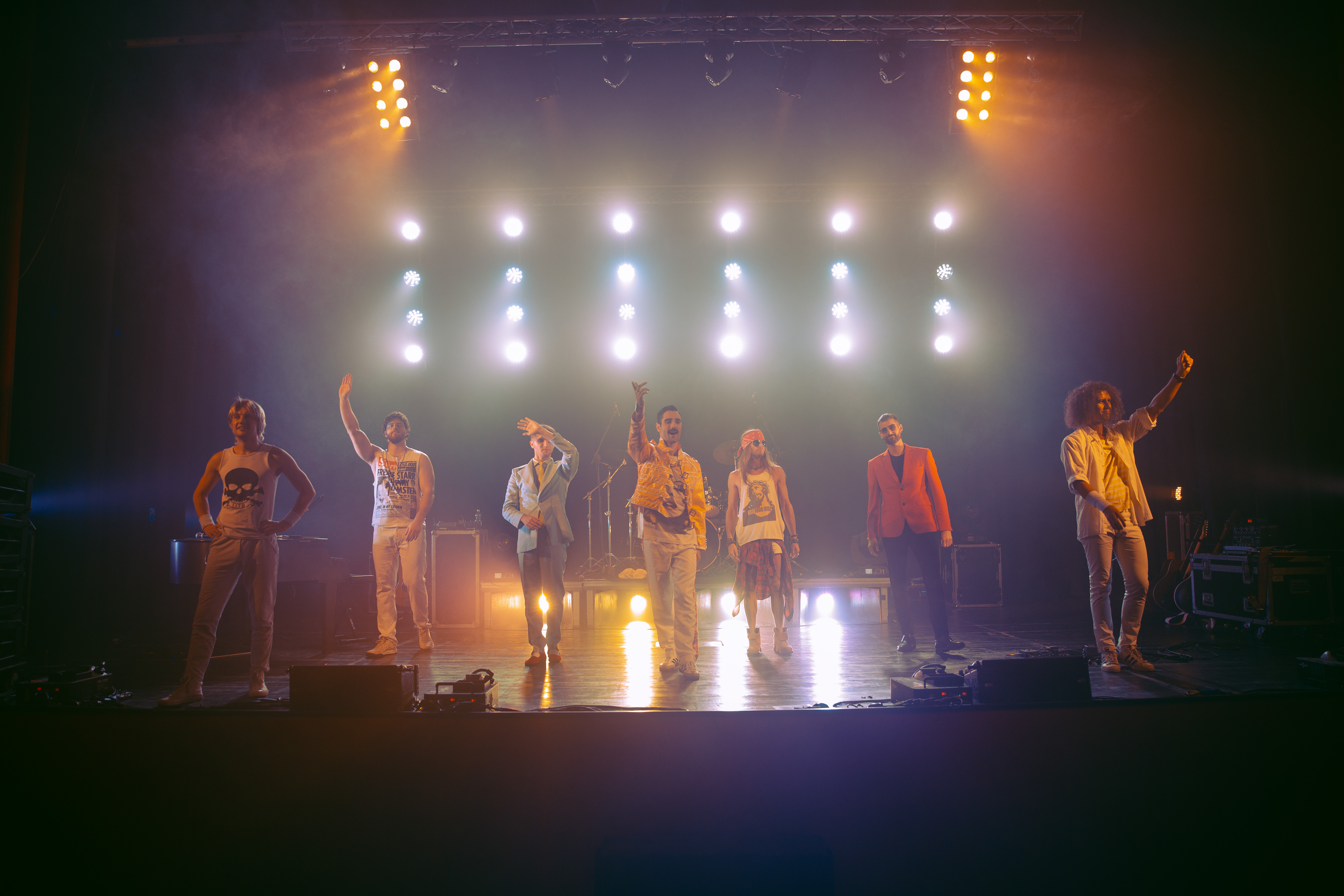

Their show Long Live the Queen brings together key moments from Queen's history of live performances, as well as drawing on collaborations with other artists (such as the Freddie Mercury Tribute Concert, "Under Pressure" with David Bowie and "Barcelona" with Montserrat Caballé). It includes arrangements for strings performed by a classical ensemble.

Costumes and choreography are based on Queen's live shows including Live Aid 1985, Montreal 1981 and Wembley 1986.

== Our Bohemian Life ==
Our Bohemian Life - Live at Gruvillage is a short concert film released by the band. It features performances from the band's 2019 live show at the Gruvillage Festival in Turin, Italy with interviews and footage of the band on tour.

The film was released on May 2, 2021, and was intended for fans to relive memories of live music during a period when it was not possible to attend concerts in most of the world due to the COVID-19 pandemic.
