= Talking to You =

Talking to You may refer to:

- Talking to You (Jakob Sveistrup song)
- Talking to You (Izzy Bizu song)
