= Wanna Go =

Single by Maxsta featuring Little Nikki
- Released: 29 September 2013
- Recorded: 2013
- Genre: Hip hop; trap
- Length: 3:33
- Label: Sony Music Entertainment
- Songwriters: Ian Koromah; Nicole Shortland; Uzoechi Emenike
- Producer: Show N Prove

Maxsta singles chronology
"Pop Off" (2012)	"Wanna Go" (2013)

Little Nikki singles chronology
"Little Nikki Says" (2013)	"Wanna Go" (2013)	"Make U Bounce" (2014)

"Wanna Go" is a song by the British rapper Maxsta, featuring vocals from British singer-songwriter Little Nikki. It was released on 29 September 2013, through Sony Music Entertainment. It entered the UK Singles Chart Update at number 40 and entered the official charts at number 43, managing to enter at number 8 in the R&B chart.

== Music video ==
A music video to accompany the release of "Wanna Go" was first released onto YouTube on 6 August 2013 at a total length of four minutes and five seconds.

== Track listing ==
Digital download
No.	Title	Length
1.	"Wanna Go" (featuring Little Nikki)	3:33
2.	"Wanna Go" (featuring Little Nikki) (Show N Prove Trap Remix)	2:59
3.	"Wanna Go" (featuring Little Nikki) (Show N Prove Trap Remix Explicit)	3:01

== Chart performance ==
=== Weekly charts ===
Chart (2013)	Peak position
UK Hip Hop/R&B (OCC)	8
UK Singles (OCC)	43

== Release history ==
Region	Date	Format	Label
Worldwide	29 September 2013	Digital download	Sony
