= Get Down Low =

Single by TC
- Released: 26 November 2013
- Genre: Trap; drum and bass
- Length: 4:20
- Label: Owsla
- Songwriter(s): Tom Casswell
- Producer(s): TC

TC singles chronology
"Do You Rock?" (2012)	"Get Down Low" (2013)	"Into the Jungle" (2013)

"Get Down Low" is a song by English record producer TC. It was released on 26 November 2013 through Skrillex's record label Owsla. It entered the UK Singles Chart at number 183.

== Background and release ==
The song is inspired by a crowd TC performed to in Romania. Casswell sent the demo version of the song to Skrillex in early 2013. Skrillex liked the song and asked TC to release an EP on his vanity record label Owsla. The song premiered on 17 March 2013 during Dog Blood's Ultra Music Festival set. 1Xtra DJ and drum and bass producer Friction played the song frequently during his 2013 live sets. Shortly before release, on 13 November 2013, it was made Zane Lowe's Hottest Record in the World for the week and received extensive airplay on the likes of BBC Radio 1 and 1Xtra.

== Music video ==
The music video for the song was released onto the UKF Drum & Bass YouTube channel on 25 November 2013 and lasts a total length of three minutes and twenty-seven seconds.

== Track listing ==
Digital download
No.	Title	Length
1.	"Get Down Low"	4:20
2.	"Vegas"	3:34
3.	"Do You Rock?"	4:28
4.	"Get Down Low" (ShockOne Remix)	3:59

Notes

- "Do You Rock?" was remastered for release on the EP after being released as a single on 21 October 2012.

== Chart performance ==
=== Weekly charts ===
Chart (2014)	Peak position
UK Dance (OCC)	25
UK Indie (OCC)	20
UK Indie Breakers (Official Charts Company)	1
UK Singles (OCC)	183
