= Nikki Ambers =

English singer-songwriter

- Born: Nicole Shortland; 6 March 1996 (age 30)
- Origin: West London, England
- Genres: Pop; R&B; dance; garage
- Occupations: Singer; songwriter; dancer
- Instruments: Singing
- Years active: 2009–present
- Labels: Mercury, Columbia, Sony
- Formerly of: SoundGirl

Nicole Shortland (born 6 March 1996), known professionally as Nikki Ambers and previously as Little Nikki, is an English singer-songwriter from London. She is best known for her 2013 single "Little Nikki Says", which peaked at number 53 on the UK Singles Chart. She was also a member of SoundGirl.

== Career ==
=== 2010–12: SoundGirl ===
She started off as a member of SoundGirl, They released the single "Don't Know Why" in June 2011, which peaked at number 45 on the UK Singles Chart. They also put two singles that were never released on their YouTube account, "The Game" and "Walking on Air". The band split up in April 2012.

=== 2012–present: Breakthrough ===
On 2 November 2012, she released her debut single "Intro Intro". On 26 April 2013, she released her second single "Where I'm Coming From". On 6 September 2013 she released her third single "Little Nikki Says" which was used for the advertisement for the summer range for Boohoo.com where Little Nikki and Boohoo created the "first ever shoppable music video", the song peaked at number 53 on the UK Singles Chart. She was featured on Maxsta's "Wanna Go", the song was released on 29 September 2013, the song peaked at number 43 on the UK Singles Chart. In addition, she co-wrote the song Towers from Little Mix's second album Salute. She has confirmed that her single "YoYo" was used in another Boohoo.com advert for their Autumn/Winter range. Nikki features on the 2014 DJ Fresh vs. TC single "Make U Bounce", a rework of TC's 2012 song "Make You Bounce", released on 22 June.

On 2 February 2019, she performed on The Voice UK.

== Discography ==
=== Singles ===
==== As lead artist ====
Title	Year	Peak chart positions	Album
Title	Year	UK	Album
"Intro Intro"	2012	—	Non-album singles
"Where I'm Coming From"	2013	—	Non-album singles
"Little Nikki Says"	2013	53	Non-album singles
"Right Before My Eyes" (featuring DJ S.K.T)	2014	140	Non-album singles
"—" denotes a single that did not chart or was not released.

==== As featured artist ====
Title	Year	Peak chart positions	Album
Title	Year	UK	Album
"Wanna Go" (Maxsta featuring Little Nikki)	2013	43	Non-album single
"Make U Bounce" (DJ Fresh vs. TC featuring Little Nikki)	2014	10	TBA
"—" denotes a single that did not chart or was not released.

=== Music videos ===
Title	Year	Director
"Intro Intro"	2012	—N/a
"Where I'm Coming From"	2013	—N/a
"Little Nikki Says"	2013	—N/a
"YoYo"	2014	—N/a
