= Make U Bounce =

Single by DJ Fresh vs. TC featuring Little Nikki
- Released: 29 June 2014
- Genre: Electro house
- Length: 3:07
- Label: Ministry of Sound; La Musique Fait La Force
- Songwriter(s): Dan Stein; Tom Casswell
- Producer(s): DJ Fresh; TC

DJ Fresh singles chronology
"Dibby Dibby Sound" (2014)	"Make U Bounce" (2014)	"Flashlight" (2014)

TC singles chronology
"Into the Jungle" (2013)	"Make U Bounce" (2014)	"Everything for a Reason" (2014)

Little Nikki singles chronology
"Wanna Go" (2013)	"Make U Bounce" (2014)	"Right Before My Eyes" (2014)

"Make U Bounce" is a single by DJ Fresh vs. TC, and the third single from Fresh's forthcoming fourth studio album. It was released on 29 June 2014 in the United Kingdom and 30 June 2014 in Belgium. The song is a reworking of an old TC track by Fresh, and features vocals from Little Nikki.

== Background ==
The track was made Zane Lowe's "Hottest Record in the World" on 10 April 2014. In an interview with Wonderland Magazine, Fresh said "I love the tune. It's one that I've been getting a really good reaction to on my DJ set," he says. "It's a track that definitely kills it on the dancefloor. As a DJ, I really love it and if I'm bouncing to it, I'm really happy." It was put on BBC Radio 1's 'A' playlist for week commencing 23 June.

== Music video ==
A music video was produced for the single. It was directed by Mickey Finnegan. In the music video, an attractive woman with a large pair of hands struggles to make her way around a party without being hit on, and after having her backside unconsensually touched a couple of times, proceeds to start slapping people around the room. Oblivious onlookers to the consequent carnage continue to touch her backside causing her to keep attacking the perpetrators. Some innocent partiers get blasted as collateral damage. One atrocity later, only her and Fresh remain, and they depart the party together.

== Critical reception ==
Capital FM called the song "the strangest house party ever", whereas Wonderland Magazine said it was "energetic" and said that it "looks like it could top the charts is fantastic". In addition, the song was called "weird and wacky" during its appearance on This Week's Fresh Music Top 20.

== Track listing ==
Digital download – single
No.	Title	Length
1.	"Make U Bounce" (Radio Edit)	3:08

Digital download – EP
No.	Title	Length
1.	"Make U Bounce" (TC Remix)	4:47
2.	"Make U Bounce" (Jus Now Remix)	4:27
3.	"Make U Bounce" (Manhattan Clique Remix)	5:37
4.	"Make U Bounce" (Extended Mix)	3:56

== Chart performance ==
Chart (2014)	Peak position
Poland (Dance Top 50)	26
Scotland (OCC)	7
UK Dance (OCC)	3
UK Indie (OCC)	1
UK Singles (OCC)	10

== Release history ==
Region	Date	Format	Label
United Kingdom	29 June 2014	Digital download	Ministry of Sound
Belgium	30 June 2014	Digital download	La Musique Fait La Force
