= Little Nikki Says =

Single by Little Nikki
- Released: 6 September 2013
- Recorded: 2013
- Genre: Pop; dance; R&B
- Length: 3:16
- Label: Sony Music Entertainment
- Songwriters: David Dawood, Emily Green, Nicole Shortland

Little Nikki singles chronology
"Where I'm Coming From" (2013)	"Little Nikki Says" (2013)	"Wanna Go" (2013)

Music video
- "Little Nikki Says" on YouTube

"Little Nikki Says" is a song by British singer/songwriter Little Nikki. The song was released in the United Kingdom on 6 September 2013 as a digital download through Sony Music Entertainment. The song has peaked to number 53 on the UK Singles Chart.

== Music video ==
A music video to accompany the release of "Little Nikki Says" was first released onto YouTube on 14 July 2013 at a total length of three minutes and sixteen seconds.

== Critical reception ==
Maximum Pop said "'Little Nikki Says' is bursting with energy and raw talent, just like the UK starlett herself. It's got Little Nikki's usual edgy vibe with a chorus to die for. The track is also quite useful for those who are not too talented on the dancefloor, as Nikki gives some instructions on how to get down: "Little Nikki says put your hands up, up, up, up high/ Little Nikki says take your hips down, down, down, down low" but be careful, because if you don't do what Nikki says the track stops and an awesome siren-infused breakdown kicks in.", while Lewis Corner of Digital Spy was less positive, saying "'Little Nikki Says' suffers from a tough case of hit and miss. "Little Nikki says, put your hands up, up, up, up, high/ Little Nikki says, take your hands down, down, round, down, low," she declares on a highly addictive chorus that is unfortunately sandwiched between clunky verses and whirring electronics that feel slightly disjointed. It's not a disaster by any means, but the jury is still out on whether this is enough to make her a household name."

== Track listing ==
Digital download
No.	Title	Length
1.	"Little Nikki Says"	3:17
2.	"Little Nikki Says" (Grant Nelson Remix)	5:53
3.	"Little Nikki Says" (Westfunk Club Remix)	4:44
4.	"Little Nikki Says" (Jonas LR Remix)	4:14
5.	"Little Nikki Says" (Majestic Remix)	5:05

== Chart performance ==
=== Weekly charts ===
Chart (2013)	Peak position
UK Singles (The Official Charts Company)	53

== Release history ==
Region	Date	Format	Label
United Kingdom	6 September 2013	Digital download	Sony Music Entertainment
