= SoundGirl =

2010–2012 British girl group

- Origin: London, United Kingdom
- Genres: R&B, pop
- Years active: 2010–2012
- Label: Mercury
- Past members: Izzy Beardshaw; Olivia Redmond; Nicole Shortland

SoundGirl were a British girl group that consisted of Izzy Beardshaw, Olivia Redmond, and Nicole Shortland.

Beardshaw and Shortland were friends and school classmates in London that sang together before another girl from their neighbourhood, Redmond, joined them to form SoundGirl. A management company, Angelic Union, held auditions for a girl band project in a dance studio. The three girls went, wrote a song in ten minutes, and sang it for Angelic Union, who reportedly signed them on the spot.

Their debut single, "I'm the Fool", featured UK rapper Twizzle. They opened for Justin Bieber, The Wanted, Scouting for Girls and Pixie Lott on tour. The band split up in April 2012 after only one charting single, "Don't Know Why", which peaked at number 45 in the UK Singles Chart.

They released a sampler for their debut album, Something to Dream About, which was never released. The sampler includes the tracks "Don't Know Why", "I'm the Fool" (feat. Twizzle), "Planes in the Sky", "Hero", and "Something to Dream About". They premiered another two of their songs, "The Game" and "Walking on Air", on their YouTube account.

Beardshaw, Redmond and Shortland subsequently began solo careers under the names Izzy Bizu, LIV and Little Nikki, respectively. In 2019, Shortland competed in the audition stage of The Voice UK, where she chose Olly Murs as coach.

== Discography ==
=== Singles ===
Title	Year	Peak chart positions		
Title	Year	UK	BEL (FL)	BEL (WA)
"Don't Know Why"	2011	45	10	21

=== Promotional singles ===
Title	Year
"I'm the Fool" (featuring Twizzle)	2010
