= A Moment of Madness =

Studio album by Izzy Bizu
- Released: 2 September 2016
- Genres: R&B; soul; pop
- Length: 52:37
- Label: Epic

Izzy Bizu chronology
Coolbeanz (2013)	A Moment of Madness (2016)

Singles from A Moment of Madness
- 1. "Adam & Eve" Released: 15 May 2015; 2. "Diamond" Released: 12 June 2015; 3. "Give Me Love" Released: 24 July 2015; 4. "White Tiger" Released: 16 October 2015; 5. "Mad Behaviour" Released: 9 February 2016; 6. "Lost Paradise" Released: 19 August 2016; 7. "Talking to You" Released: 9 December 2016

Professional ratings
Aggregate scores
Source	Rating
Metacritic	65/100
Review scores
Source	Rating
The Line of Best Fit	(7.5/10)
DIY	3/5 stars
The Guardian	3/5 stars
The Observer	3/5 stars

A Moment of Madness is the debut studio album by British singer-songwriter Izzy Bizu. The album was released on 2 September 2016.

== Background ==
In June 2014, Bizu was selected by BBC Introducing to perform at Glastonbury Festival. In July 2014, she signed to Epic Records UK. A year later, she released the first singles from her debut album, "Adam & Eve" and "Diamond" which enjoyed support from BBC Radio 1, Radio 2 and 1Xtra. and performed at Glastonbury for the second time. In September 2015, following the release of her single "Give Me Love", she also made her TV debut on Later... with Jools Holland. Bizu supported both Rudimental and Foxes on their UK headline tours. In November 2015, Bizu was shortlisted for a Brit Critics' Choice award and won the BBC Music Introducing Award.

== Track listing ==
A Moment of Madness – Standard version
No.	Title	Writer(s)	Producer(s)	Length
1.	"Diamond"	Isobel Bizu Beardshaw; Ian Barter	Barter	3:48
2.	"White Tiger"	Beardshaw; Mika Barroux	Dan Grech-Marguerat	3:27
3.	"Skinny"	Beardshaw; Barter	Barter	3:55
4.	"Naïve Soul"	Beardshaw; Barroux; Paul Herman; Justin Broad	Herman; Broad	3:59
5.	"Give Me Love"	Beardshaw; Barroux; Herman; Broad	Herman; Broad	3:16
6.	"Adam & Eve"	Beardshaw; Barroux; Jonathan Lipsey	Jony Rockstar	3:15
7.	"Talking to You"	Beardshaw; Broad; Herman	Broad; Herman	3:24
8.	"Gorgeous"	Beardshaw; Barroux; John Beck; Steve Chrisanthou	Beck; Christanthou	3:20
9.	"Lost Paradise"	Beardshaw; Jimmy Hogarth	Hogarth	4:05
10.	"Glorious"	Beardshaw; Barter; Jamie Scott	Barter	3:33
11.	"What Makes You Happy"	Beardshaw; Barter; Barroux	Barter	3:31
12.	"Mad Behaviour"	Beardshaw; Barroux; Joseph Stoddart	Grech-Marguerat; Mike Spencer	4:40
13.	"Circles"	Beardshaw; Barroux; Herman; Broad	Herman; Broad	4:14
14.	"I Know"	Beardshaw; Barter	Barter	4:10

A Moment of Madness – Deluxe edition (bonus tracks)
No.	Title	Writer(s)	Producer(s)	Length
15.	"Fly With Your Eyes Closed"	Beardshaw; Barroux; Herman; Broad	Herman; Broad	3:45
16.	"Hello Crazy"	Beardshaw; Barroux; Adam Argyle	Argyle	3:27
17.	"Someone That Loves You" (with Honne)	Andy Clutterback; James Hatcher; Beardshaw	Honne	4:04
18.	"Trees & Fire"	Beardshaw; Barroux; Harry Rutherford; Luke Juby	The Firm	2:54

== Charts ==
Chart (2016–17)	Peak position
Australian Albums (ARIA)	86
Belgian Albums (Ultratop Flanders)	94
Dutch Albums (Album Top 100)	95
French Albums (SNEP)	82
Irish Albums (IRMA)	47
New Zealand Heatseekers Albums (RMNZ)	10
Scottish Albums (Official Charts)	20
Swiss Albums (Schweizer Hitparade)	52
UK Albums (Official Charts)	23
