= Maxsta =

- Born: Ian Sanusee Koromah; 1995 (age 30–31); Lewisham, South East London, England
- Origin: Newham, East London, England
- Genres: Grime; British hip hop
- Occupation: Rapper
- Instrument: Vocals
- Years active: 2006–present
- Labels: Electric City; Just Jam; Sony; Rinse; Ditto

Ian Sanusee Koromah (born 1995), better known by the stage name Maxsta, is an English grime MC from South East London. He is signed to Just Jam, a subsidiary of Sony Music Entertainment. A fast-paced, choppy style of delivery has led him to be compared to fellow London rapper Dizzee Rascal. He has worked with Tinie Tempah, Chipmunk, and Wiley.

== Early life ==
Koromah was born in Lewisham, London, in 1995. His parents had moved from Sierra Leone to avoid its civil war. Raised in Peckham, Koromah's family then moved to East Ham in the borough of Newham. It was here that Koromah attended Langdon School: the same school as Kano attended. He became known as Maxsta after telling people his name was Maxwell to avoid being called Ian. While at school Koromah became heavily interested in music, taking lessons in the guitar, piano and cello.

Koromah has stated in several interviews that he enjoys a diverse selection of music. As a child he was initially into rock music and skateboarding before becoming interested in grime, being introduced to it through JME's "Shut Your Mouth" and Ghetto's "2000 and Life".

== Career ==
By the age of 14, a growing love of the genre led Koromah to experiment with rapping himself. Early in his career Maxsta went by the name Macksta. His music was heard by several other MCs in London, including the rapper God's Gift, part of the grime collective Mucky Wolfpack, based in Bow. This led him to join the group. Shortly afterwards however, he decided to go solo. Koromah worked with several well established names in grime over this period, including the MC Jammer.

On 30 June 2009, Koromah released East London Is Back, a "stunningly spartan Atari teenage riot of electro bloops and beeps". The song received much attention and was given support by national radio stations BBC Radio 1 and BBC Radio 1Xtra. This paved the way for a mixtape, The Maxtape, released on 29 March 2010. It was a commercial success, selling out in the first few days. Shortly afterwards, Koromah performed at T in the Park 2010.

However, in response to the lyrical content in his music, Koromah suffered several physical assaults, including one incident in which he was stabbed. To avoid continuing violence Koromah and his family left East Ham, moving to Essex. This string of incidents prompted Koromah to rethink his approach to music.

His new musical direction was reflected in the song Average Kid, which was released in early 2011.

Shortly afterwards, in March 2011, Koromah was signed to Just Jam Records, a subsidiary of Sony Music Entertainment. The label is owned by entrepreneur Jamal Edwards, CEO of the successful online urban music platform SB:TV. Subsequently, Koromah featured in the 2011 Google Chrome advert, the second most popular YouTube advert of the year. Koromah was also involved in the Adidas We Are London advertising campaign.

On 5 August 2012, Koromah's debut single was released, titled "I Wanna Rock". It reached number 67 in the UK charts and received support from several radio DJs; it was featured as Radio 1 presenter Nick Grimshaw's record of the week. "I Wanna Rock" was also remixed and featured guest vocals from fellow London rapper Tinchy Stryder, Rizzle Kicks and the Birmingham-based MC Lady Leshurr.

Koromah's second single "Pop Off" followed "I Wanna Rock". His debut album was due to be released in February 2013 but was postponed to 2014.

His third single "Wanna Go" featuring Little Nikki was released on 29 September 2013. It entered the UK Singles Chart at number 46, being his most successful single to date.

He dropped a new freestyle in 2016 called "M Sport Riddim". He went on The Grime Show: Rinse FM with Sir Spyro.

== Personal life ==
On 19 March 2012, Koromah announced via Twitter that his brother Kevin Koromah had died at the age of 14. Speaking several months later, he stated: "That day I became a beast ... For me, failure is not an option now; it's not in my vocabulary. The last thing I want is my brother to look down and see me wasting my opportunity."

== Discography ==
=== Mixtapes ===
- 2010: Maxtape
- 2018: Maxtape 2

=== EPs ===
- 2010: The Come Up
- 2011: The Maxst EP
- 2012: Gear 6
- 2015: A12 Link Up [with Brotherhood]
- 2015: 100 Problems [with Boothroyd & Maniac]
- 2019: Electric 001
- 2019: On the Buttons [Instrumentals]
