= White Tiger (song) =

Single by Izzy Bizu

from the album A Moment of Madness
- Released: 16 October 2015
- Genre: Soul, R&B, power Pop
- Length: 3:27
- Label: Epic records
- Songwriters: Izzy Bizu, Mika Barroux
- Producer: Dan Grech-Marguerat

Izzy Bizu singles chronology
"Give Me Love" (2015)	"White Tiger" (2015)	"Mad Behaviour" (2016)

"White Tiger" is a 2015 song by English soul singer Izzy Bizu from the album A Moment of Madness.

It was featured in a 2018 commercial for Cacharel.

== Track listing ==
No.	Title	Length
1.	"White Tiger (single version)"	2:58
Total length:		2:58

== Charts ==
Chart (2016)	Peak position
Austria (Ö3 Austria Top 40)	65
Belgium (Ultratop 50 Flanders)	35
Belgium (Ultratop 50 Wallonia)	45
France (SNEP)	57
Germany (GfK)	54
Scotland Singles (Official Charts)	51
Sweden Heatseeker (Sverigetopplistan)	11
UK Singles (Official Charts)	90

== Certifications ==
Region	Certification	Certified units/sales
United Kingdom (BPI)	Gold	400,000^{‡}
^{‡} Sales+streaming figures based on certification alone.
