= Point Blank Music School =

UK academic institution

Coordinates: 51.5360°N 0.0851°W

pointblank Music School
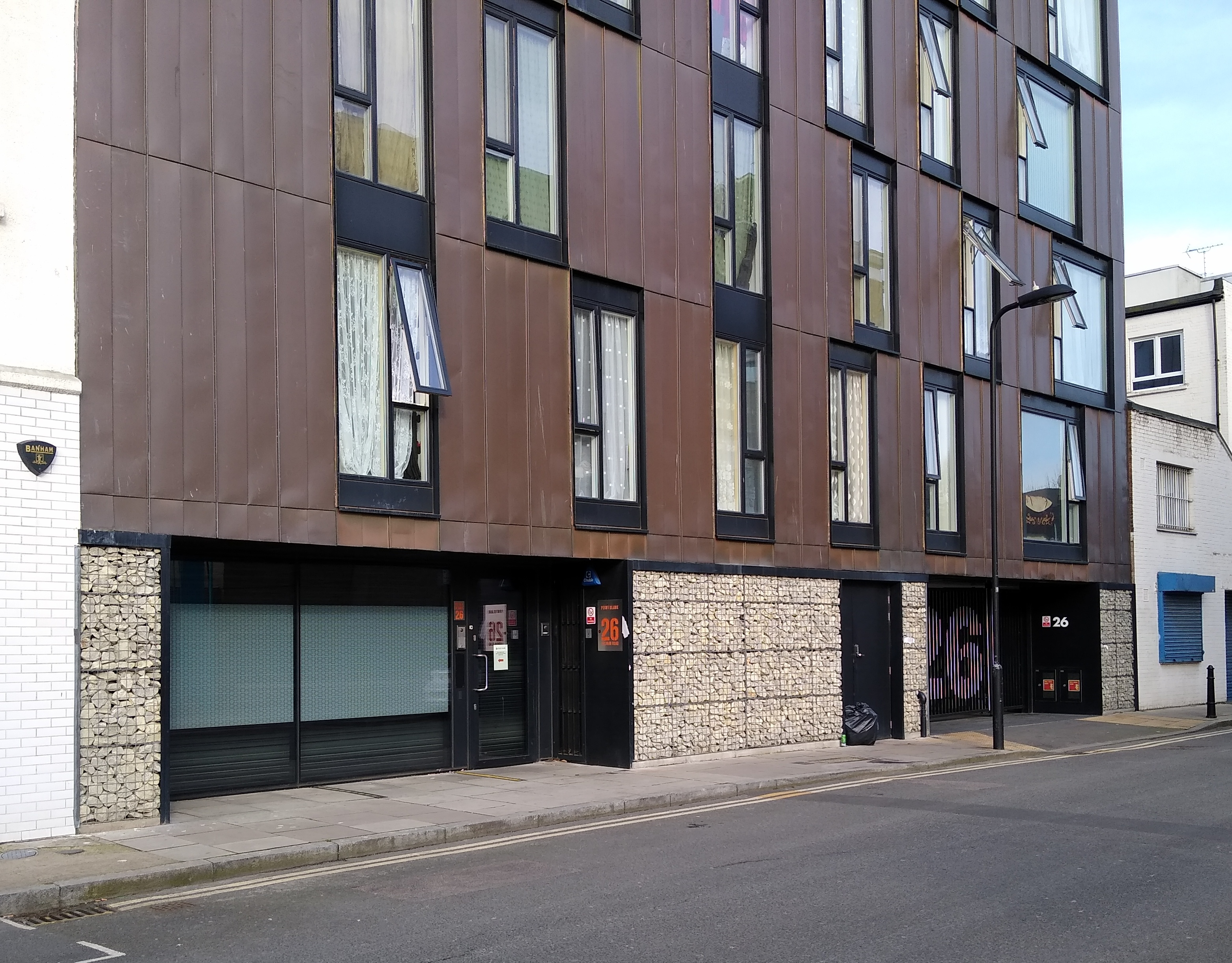
- Type: Private
- Established: 1994
- CEO: Rob Cowan
- Location: London, Los Angeles, Ibiza, Mumbai
- Website: pointblankmusicschool.com

pointblank is a global network of music production schools founded in London in 1994 by musician and producer Robert Cowan, offering a variety of courses in electronic music production, sound engineering, DJing, singing, songwriting, radio broadcasting, and music business. In addition to its original school in Hoxton, North London, pointblank now has schools in Los Angeles, Ibiza, Mumbai, Hangzhou, Shenzhen, and online.

== History ==
pointblank started as a recording studio in Greenwich, London in 1994. Founder and CEO Rob Cowan had previously been a bass player in Sony-signed band Honeychile and worked as a studio engineer for Matrix studios, working with artists such as D:Ream and Blur. Originally set up as a recording studio, pointblank quickly evolved into a school after clients expressed an interest in learning about how the gear worked themselves. The school eventually relocated to its current buildings in Hoxton, London where it offers courses on music production, sound engineering, DJ performance, singing, songwriting, radio broadcasting, music business, and live sound.

In 2013, the school was banned by the Border Agency from sponsoring non-EU nationals for offering too many places to students who failed to meet the rules. It had previously had 'highly trusted' status for a decade, and the school's managing director blamed the issue on 'formalities and clerical errors on the side of the UKBA.' It was reinstated in the same year after a re-inspection.

In 2015, pointblank opened a school in Los Angeles, originally housed in the historic Mack Sennett Studios. In 2022, pointblank L.A. moved its operations to a standalone campus facility on La Brea Avenue, one mile south of Hollywood. pointblank's L.A. school provides students with postsecondary programs in music production, audio engineering, DJ performance, vocal & instrumental performance, and music industry studies.

In 2016, pointblank extended their facilities in London by opening a second studio complex. The second premises, also located in Hoxton, features 7 purpose-built teaching studios, including DJ and music production equipment such as a SSL Duality Delta mixing desk.

In 2017, pointblank opened an additional school in San Jose, Ibiza. The school, which is found in Ibiza's Can Blau facility, offers students a DJing and Music Producing hybrid course. In September of the same year, pointblank announced the launch of a two-week DJ/Entrepreneur course in Mumbai, in collaboration with The True School of Music.

In 2019, pointblank opened a school in Hangzhou, China. The school, in partnership with NetEase FEVER, offers courses including music production, DJing, singing & songwriting, music industry, and weekend courses.

== Notable alumni ==
- Goldie - musician / DJ
- Felix Jaehn - record producer / DJ
- Nicole Moudaber - record producer / DJ
- Claude VonStroke - musician / DJ
- Leona Lewis - singer / songwriter
- Mishlawi - hip-hop artist
- Luke Black - singer / songwriter
- Patrick Topping - DJ, producer
- Monki - DJ
- Aluna Francis
- Izzy Bizu
- Gemma Cairney
- Klingande

== Partnerships ==
pointblank is an Ableton Education Partner, an Apple Inc. Training Centre, Steinberg Training Centre and Native Instruments Training Centre. It has also partnered with Solid State Logic (SSL) since 2016.

== Record Label ==
pointblank runs its own in-house record label, pointblank Recordings, founded to help establish talented students in the music industry.
