= Talking to You (Izzy Bizu song) =

Single by Izzy Bizu

from the album A Moment of Madness
- Released: 9 December 2016
- Genre: Soul, pop
- Length: 3:24
- Songwriter(s): Izzy Bizu, Justin Michael Beard, Paul Philip Herman

Izzy Bizu singles chronology
"Lost Paradise" (2016)	"Talking to You" (2016)	"Lights On" (2019)

"Talking to You" is a 2016 song by English soul singer Izzy Bizu from her debut album A Moment of Madness. To date, it is her highest charting single in the UK and Scotland.

== Charts ==
Chart	Peak position
Scotland	17
United Kingdom	56
