= TC (musician) =

English music producer, singer and DJ

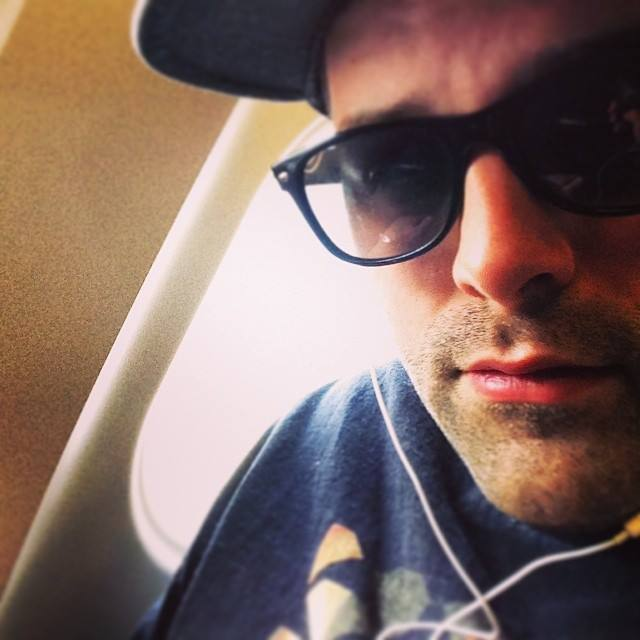

Background information
- Also known as: Tommy Boy
- Born: Tom Casswell; 10/02/1982
- Origin: Bristol, England
- Genres: Drum and bass; dubstep; electronic
- Occupations: DJ; producer; singer
- Years active: 1999–present
- Labels: BS1 Records; 3Beat; Owsla; D-Style; Don't Play
- Website: tcdnb.com

Tom Casswell, better known as TC and also as Tommy Boy, is an English drum and bass producer, singer and DJ. He left school and started making music inspired by the sounds of the Bristol scene and the music and atmosphere of St. Paul's, the area of Bristol where he grew up.

The first two releases from TC "Get It On" and "Make a Little Space" appeared on Bristol based label BS1 Records. His debut album, Evolution, was released in 2007 on D-Style Recordings. TC also presented the latest edition of Watch the Ride, a compilation CD released several times a year. Scratch Perverts and DJ Zinc have released them previously. His tracks "Deep" (featuring MC Jakes) and "Jump" have achieved critical acclaim in the rave scene. TC has made appearances on shows hosted by Radio 1's Zane Lowe and was regarded as a breath of fresh air in the drum and bass scene.

He is featured as a vocalist and an additional producer in "Plasticworld", a song on Pendulum's 2005 album Hold Your Colour (which topped 225,000 sales), along with other featured artist Fats. He was also a vocalist for the Sub Focus song "Follow the Light", which was featured in Douwma's self-titled album, Sub Focus. His follow-up Sub Focus collaboration with Culture Shock, "You Make It Better", also features his vocals and was released on Torus. His 2013 single "Get Down Low" was released through Skrillex's record label Owsla and entered the UK Singles Chart at number 183.

In 2014, DJ Fresh reworked Casswell's previously unreleased song "Make You Bounce" and Little Nikki added vocals. The product, "Make U Bounce", was released on 29 June as the third single from Fresh's forthcoming fourth studio album. Following its chart success, Casswell signed to 3Beat for his next single "Everything for a Reason", released on 26 October. His collaboration with Wilkinson, entitled "Hit the Floor", was released in January 2015 through RAM Records.

In January 2016, he played the world's first Dolby Atmos night, at Ministry of Sound.

TC's sophomore album, Unleash the Wolves, was released on 8 July 2016 via 3Beat, and includes the single "Rep" (featuring Jakes). He was also the featured vocalist on Zomboy's single "Saints and Sinners", released on 7 August 2017.

== Discography ==
=== Albums ===
- Evolution – D-Style Recordings – 8 October 2007
- Unleash the Wolves - 3Beat - 8 July 2016
- Circles of Fifths - Don't Play Records- 27 October 2017

=== Singles and EPs ===
- Resonator / Get It On (12") – BS1 Records – 2002
- Getcha Some More / Make A Little Space (12") – BS1 Records – 2003
- Jamaica Street / All on Me (12") – Beatz – 2004
- Fire in the Hole (Remixes) (12") – D-Style Recordings – 2005
- Let's Go / New Year (12") – Valve – 2005
- No Escape / Sick & Twisted (12") – Test Recordings – 2005
- Deep / Robots (12") – D-Style Recordings – 2006
- Jump / Flatline (12") – D-Style Recordings – 2006
- Rock Star / Game Over (12") – D-Style Recordings – 2007
- Where's My Money? / Deep (Roni Size VIP) (12") – D-Style Recordings – 2007
- Where's My Money (Clipz Remix) / Drink (Xample Remix) (12") – D-Style Recordings – 2008
- Where's My Money (Caspa Remix) / Tron (12") – D-Style Recordings – 2008
- Borrowed Time VIP / Pornstar (12") D-Style Recordings – 2008
- Concrete / Burning Starlight (12") – Don't Play – 2011
- Tap Ho / Don't Play (12") – Don't Play – 2011
- Bass by the Tonne EP (2×12") – Don't Play – 2012
- No One / Tap Ho (Taxman Remix) (12") – Don't Play – 2012
- Do You Rock? / Drug FuCT (12") – Don't Play – 2012
- Get Down Low (EP) – Owsla – 2013
- Into the Jungle / Deuces – Don't Play – 2014
- Make U Bounce (DJ Fresh vs. TC) – Ministry of Sound – 2014
- Everything for a Reason – 3Beat – 2014
- Hit the Floor (with Wilkinson) - RAM Records - 2015
- The Countdown - Self-released - 2015
- Show Some Love (featuring Little Grace) - 3Beat - 2015
- Rep (featuring Jakes) - 3Beat - 2015
- Saints and Sinners (With. Zomboy) [Never Say Die] — 2017

=== Remixes ===
Year	Song	Artist
2004	"Fight Club"	Distorted Minds
2005	"Original Junglesound"	Adam F
2005	"Revolution Solution"	Thievery Corporation
2005	"It's Yours"	Aspect
2005	"Zissou"	Brooklyn
2006	"Look to the Future"	DJ Hype
2006	"Herb Smoke"	Aries
2006	"Let Loose"	The Militia
2006	"Warhead"	Krust
2006	"Maintain"	Krust
2006	"Shiva"	Thievery Corporation
2008	"Push It Up"	Clipz
2009	"Day 'n' Nite"	Kid Cudi vs. Crookers
2009	"Riverside (Let's Go)"	Sidney Samson featuring Wizard Sleeve
2009	"So Fine"	Sean Paul
2009	"Under Control"	Freeland
2009	"They Live!"	Evil Nine
2010	"Nothin' on You"	B.o.B featuring Bruno Mars
2010	"Rude Boy"	Rihanna
2010	"As We Enter"	Nas and Damian Marley
2010	"Frisky"	Tinie Tempah featuring Labrinth
2010	"Last Ones Standing"	Example
2011	"Cry Baby"	Cee Lo Green
2011	"Slaughter House"	Joker featuring Silas
2012	"Freak"	Estelle
2012	"Say Nothing"	Example
2012	"Charge"	Sway featuring Mr Hudson
2012	"Red Heat"	SKisM
2012	"Moving Together"	Document One featuring Tigerlight and Maksim
2012	"Magnetic Eyes"	Matrix & Futurebound featuring Baby Blue
2012	"Gold Dust"	DJ Fresh featuring Ms. Dynamite
2012	"No One"	Maverick Sabre
2012	"Karmageddon"	Dot Rotten
2012	"On It"	Caspa featuring Mighty High Coup
2013	"Get Lucky" (TC Bootleg)	Daft Punk featuring Pharrell Williams
2013	"Need U (100%)" (TC Bootleg)	Duke Dumont featuring A*M*E
2013	"Au Seve" (TC Bootleg)	Julio Bashmore
2013	"Latch" (TC Bootleg)	Disclosure featuring Sam Smith
2013	"Diamonds" (TC Bootleg)	Rihanna
2013	"Again-I"	The Upbeats featuring Armanni Reign
2013	"Babylon"	DC Breaks
2013	"Turn It Around"	Sub Focus featuring Kele
2013	"Earthquake"	DJ Fresh vs. Diplo featuring Dominique Young Unique
2013	"Badd"	Stylo G featuring Sister Nancy
2014	"Intoxicated"	Javeon
2014	"Make U Bounce"	DJ Fresh vs. TC
2014	"Right Here"	Jess Glynne
2014	"Neon Hallway"	Corbu
2014	"Dirty Love"	Wilkinson featuring Talay Riley
2014	"Losing"	Becky Hill
2015	"Raga"	Barely Alive & Astronaut
2015	"Real Joy" (Bootleg)	Fono
2015	"Down"	WiDE AWAKE featuring Tanya Lacey
2015	"Georgia"	Tiggs Da Author
2016	"Crank It (Woah!)"	Kideko & George Kwali featuring Nadia Rose & Sweetie Irie
2016	"Talk to Me" (As Tommy Boy)	Myro
2017	"Starboy" (TC Bootleg)	The Weeknd featuring Daft Punk
2017	"Party Till the Daylight"	Hardwell
2017	"Why Does My Heart Feel So Bad?"	Moby
2017	"Do It Like Me (Icy Feet)"	TCTS featuring Sage the Gemini & Kelis
2017	"Rockstar" (TC bootleg)	Post Malone featuring 21 Savage
