= Mishlawi =

American-born Portuguese rapper (born 1996)

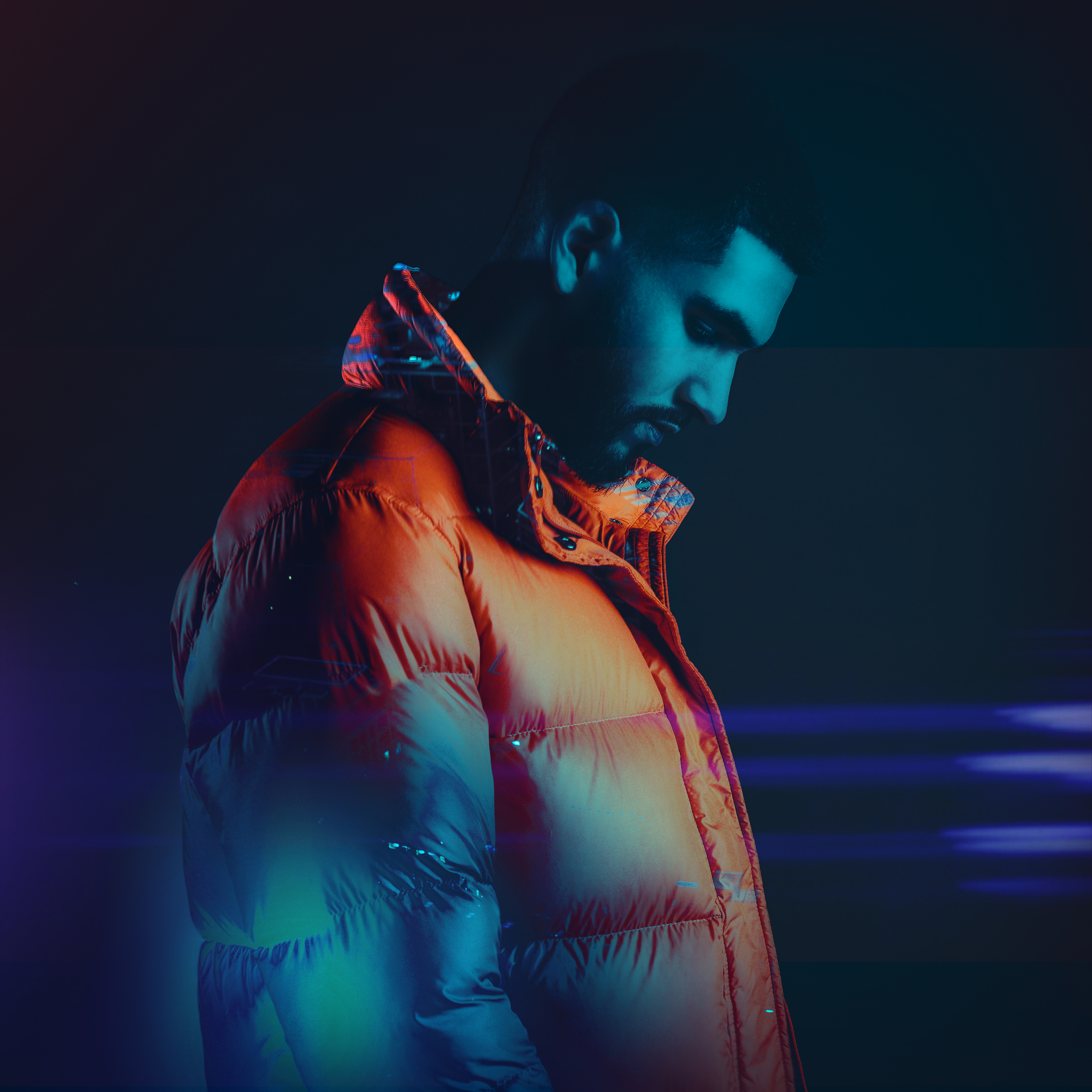
- Solitaire album cover; 2019.

Background information
- Born: Tarik Mishlawi; September 25, 1996 (age 29); United States
- Origin: Cascais, Portuguese Riviera
- Genres: Hip hop
- Years active: 2014-present
- Label: Bridgetown Records

Tarik Mishlawi (born September 25, 1996), known professionally as Mishlawi, is an American hip-hop performing artist, dubbed as "Portuguese Hip Hop's revelation" by La Vanguardia, and commonly referred to as a "TransAtlantic talent",

== Early life and education ==
Tarik Mishlawi was born on September 25, 1996, in the United States. He moved to Cascais, Portugal, on the Portuguese Riviera. He attended the Carlucci American International School of Lisbon until graduating high school, after which he attended American University, in Washington, DC, for two years, before attending the Point Blank Music School in London.

== Career ==
Mishlawi started his musical career on YouTube, before he was discovered by Richie Campbell and subsequently signed to Bridgetown Records, and later by Universal music and Island records.

Mishlawi has become a popular performing artist at many of Portugal's prominent music festivals, including the world famous MEO Sudoeste festival.

== Discography ==
=== Albums ===
- Mishlawi EP (2018)
- Solitaire (2019)

=== Mixtapes ===
- Wiz Kid (2014)

=== Singles ===
- "All Night" (2016)
- "Always on My Mind" (2016)
- "Limbo" (2016)
- "Time", featuring Zara G (2016)
- "Boohoo", featuring Richie Campbell (2016)
- "Turn Back" (2017)
- "What's Happening" (2017)
- "Ignore" (2017)
- "Afterthought", featuring Trace Nova (2017)
- "FMR" (2018)
- "Homies & Pythons" (2018)
- "Rain" with Richie Campbell and Plutónio (2018)
- "Bad Intentions" (2018)
- "Uber Driver" (2019)
- "Audemars", featuring Nasty C (2019)
- "Hotel", featuring gson (2020)
- "Break It" (2020)
- "Growing Pains" (2020)
