= Izzy Bizu =

British-Ethiopian singer-songwriter (born 1994)

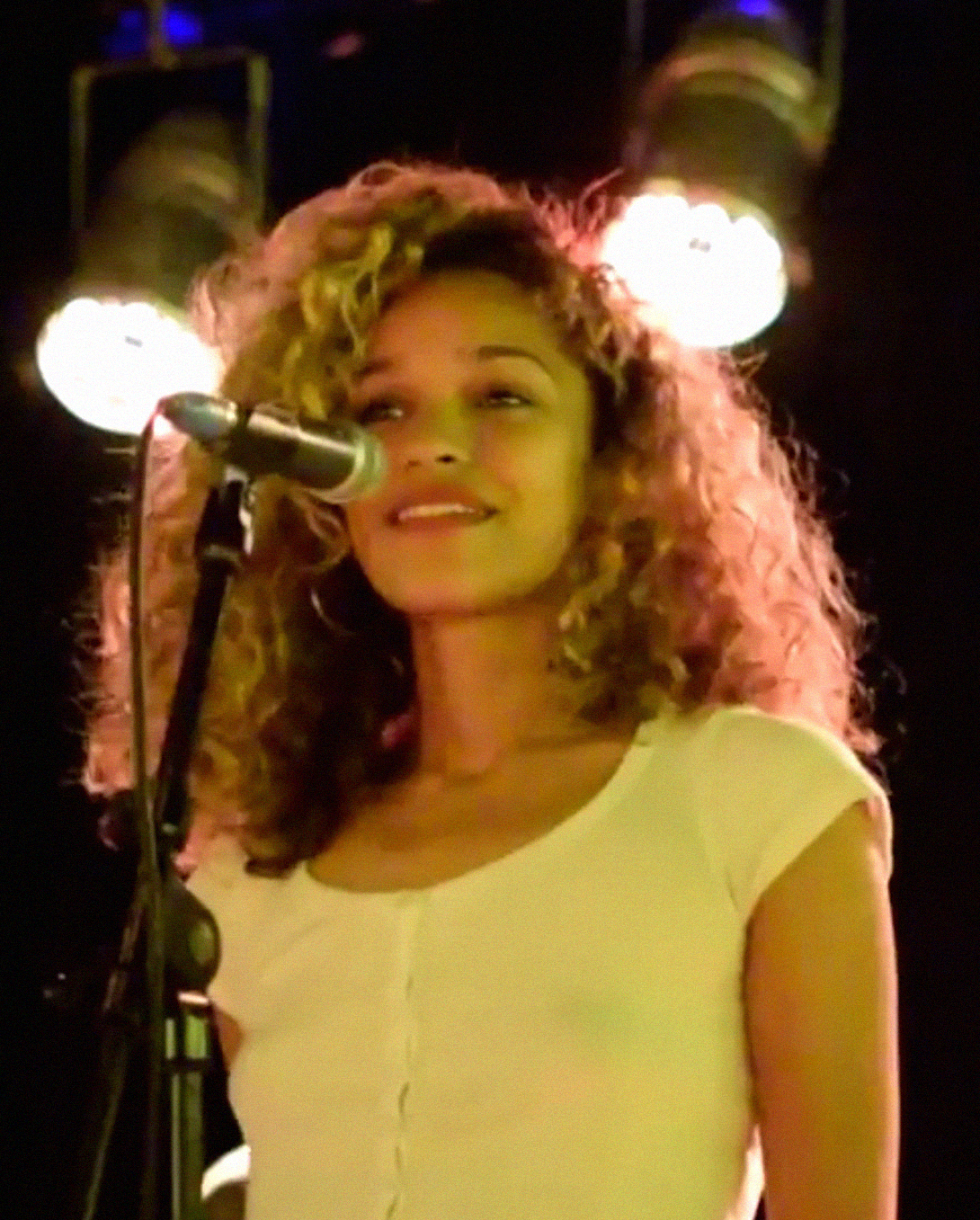
- Bizu performing in September 2015

Background information
- Born: Isobel Bizu Beardshaw; 28 April 1994 (age 32); London, England
- Genres: Soul; pop; R&B
- Occupations: Singer; songwriter
- Years active: 2009–present
- Labels: Epic Records, Hi-Tea Records (current)
- Formerly of: SoundGirl
- Website: izzybizu.com

Isobel Bizu Beardshaw (born 28 April 1994), better known as Izzy Bizu, is a British-Ethiopian singer-songwriter previously signed with Epic Records. Bizu has garnered mainstream radio support from BBC Radio 1's Annie Mac and Phil Taggart and BBC Radio 1Xtra's Trevor Nelson. She has supported Coldplay, Sam Smith, Rudimental, and Foxes. In November 2015, Bizu was shortlisted for a Brit Critics' Choice award and longlisted for BBC's Sound of... 2016. She won the BBC Music Introducing Award at the 2016 ceremony. On 25 June 2016, Bizu performed on the Park Stage at the Glastonbury Festival.

== Biography ==
Izzy Bizu is from southwest London, and attended Stamford High School, Lincolnshire. Her mother is Ethiopian and her father is English. She grew up between Ethiopia and Bahrain, where her father worked, before moving to London as a teen. She studied music tech in college, but dropped out shortly afterwards,but still attended and completed Point Blank Music School's song writing course before making a name for herself.

== Career ==
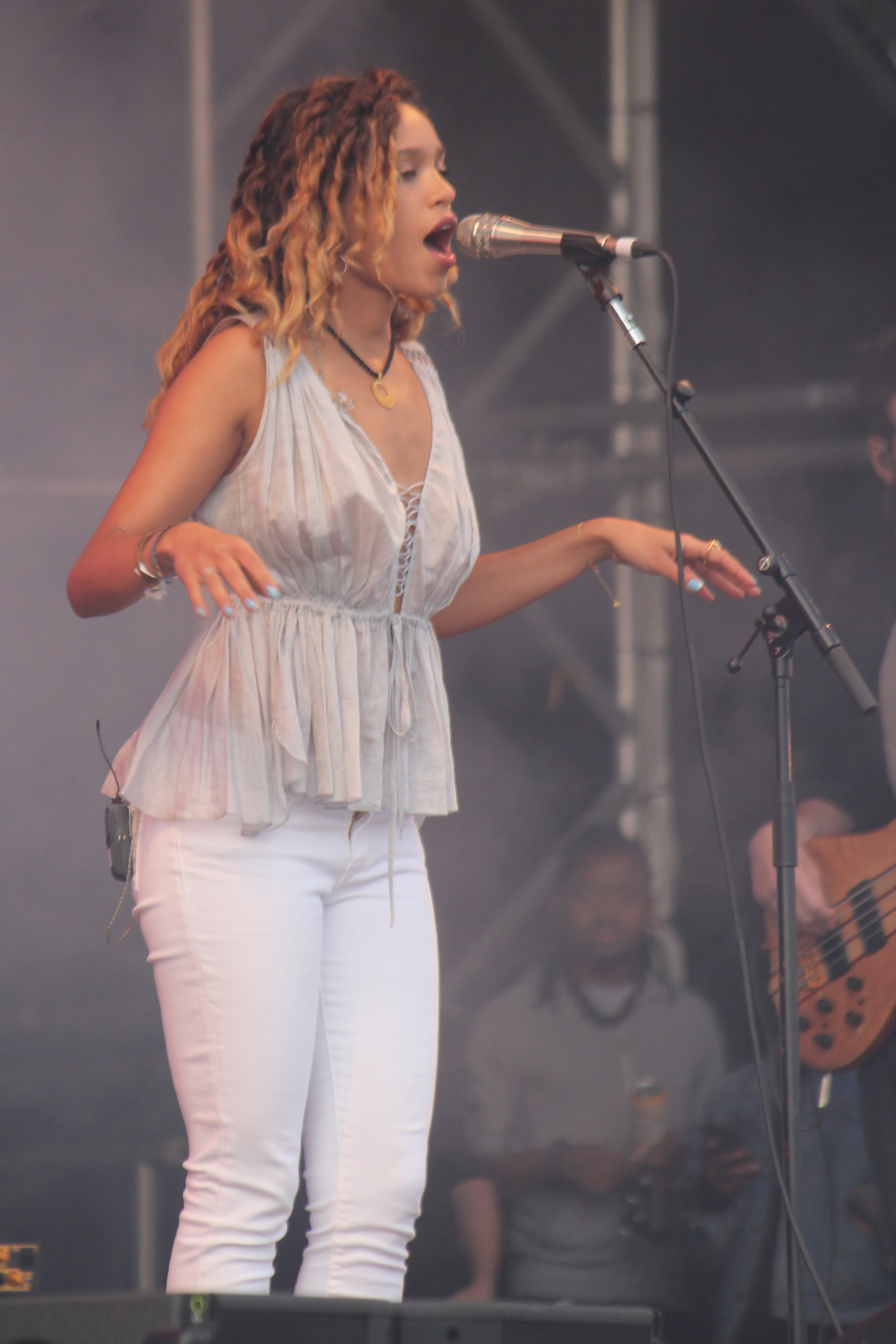
Izzy Bizu performing at the Victorious Festival, 2016

=== 2013: Coolbeanz ===
After the girl group SoundGirl split, Bizu won an open mic night competition in February 2013 winning over the crowd, which included Emeli Sande and Naughty Boy, who were in attendance. She released her first independent EP, Coolbeanz, in September 2013, which debuted at number 3 on the iTunes Soul and RnB Chart and has sold 50,000 copies. The EP's lead single, "White Tiger", was also chosen as Zane Lowe's 'Next Hype'. In October 2013, she supported Sam Smith on their UK tour, and in November Jamie Cullum handpicked her to open for him at The Roundhouse in London.

=== 2014–2016: A Moment of Madness ===
In January 2014, Bizu entered Glastonbury Festival's Emerging Talent Competition and made it to the final 8 of the competition, performing at the live finals of the event at Pilton Working Men's Club in April 2014. Bizu was named runner-up, winning £2,500 from the PRS Foundation and a slot at that year's Glastonbury Festival.

In June 2014, Bizu was also selected by BBC Introducing to perform at the Glastonbury Festival. In July 2014, she signed to Epic Records UK. A year later, she released the first singles from her debut album, "Adam & Eve" and "Diamond", which enjoyed support from BBC Radio 1, Radio 2 and 1Xtra, and performed at Glastonbury for the second time.

In September 2015, following the release of her single "Give Me Love", she also made her TV debut on Later... with Jools Holland. Bizu supported both Rudimental and Foxes on their UK headline tours. In November 2015, Bizu was shortlisted for a Brit Critics' Choice award. In January 2016 Bizu's song 'White Tiger' featured on the advert for National Citizen Service (NCS) and in March 2016 she performed at NCS Yes Live alongside Tinie Tempah and Jess Glynne. Her debut album, A Moment of Madness, was released on 2 September 2016. In April 2016, Bizu recorded (with the BBC Concert Orchestra) an uptempo, updated version of the Edith Piaf 1957 hit "La Foule" as the theme music for the BBC's coverage of the Euro 2016 Football Tournament.

Izzy Bizu was featured as a vocalist on Milky Chance's track "Bad Things" on their 2017 album Blossom, and on Kungs and David Guetta's 2024 single "All Night Long."

=== 2016–present ===
Bizu is UK ambassador for Studio Samuel, a non-profit that empowers girls in Ethiopia through education and job-based training.

Bizu is currently signed with Hi-Tea records, a division of the UK-based Logan Media Entertainment music label, where she is also a music producer.

In the United States, Bizu is represented by Sony's RED MUSIC label.

== Personal life ==
Bizu once wanted to be a veterinarian but began pursuing music after being discovered during an audition for a teenage-girl band at the age of 15.

Bizu is a skateboarder, having picked up the practice from her former ex-boyfriend and guitarist Mika Barroux.

She regularly visits her mother's birthplace of Ethiopia with family to volunteer.

She's not a fan of rollercoaster rides, saying in a 2016 interview that she freaked out and had to leave a Thorpe Park ride before it started.

== Artistry ==
Bizu has described herself as a fan of jazz-fusion mixes and a lover of squat parties and warehouse raves. She grew up listening to Whitney Houston, Ella Fitzgerald, Bettye Swann and James Brown and draws on these influences alongside newer influences such as Amy Winehouse and Adele to create a fusion of soul, funk, jazz and pop.

She lists The Black Keys, Diana Ross, Grammatics and Sam Cooke among her other influences.

Her Ethiopian heritage is also an influence in her music.

Bizu hopes to one day collaborate with Anderson .Paak and Kendrick Lamar.

== Discography ==
=== Studio albums ===
Title	Details	Peak chart positions					
Title	Details	UK	AUS	BEL (FL)	JPN	NLD	SCO
A Moment of Madness	Released: September 2, 2016; Label: Epic Records; Formats: Digital download, CD, Vinyl	23	86	94	96	95	20

=== Extended plays ===
Title	Details
Coolbeanz	Released: 1 September 2013; Label: Self-released; Formats: Digital download
Glita	Released: 3 May 2019; Label: Sony Music Entertainment; Formats: Digital download
Don't Have to Say	Released: 8 December 2023; Label: Hi-Tea Records; Formats: Digital download

=== Singles ===
==== As lead artist ====
Year	Title	Peak chart positions								Certifications	Album
Year	Title	UK	AUT	BEL (FL)	BEL (WA)	FRA	GER	JPN	SCO	Certifications	Album
2015	"Diamond"	—	—	—	—	—	—	—	—		A Moment of Madness
2015	"Adam & Eve"	—	—	—	—	—	—	—	—		A Moment of Madness
2015	"Give Me Love"	—	—	—	—	—	—	—	—		A Moment of Madness
2015	"White Tiger"	90	65	— (Note: "White Tiger" did not enter the Flemish Ultratop 50, but peaked at number 3 on the Ultratip chart.)	45	57	54	19	51	BPI: Gold	A Moment of Madness
2016	"Mad Behaviour"	—	—	—	—	—	—	—	—		A Moment of Madness
2016	"Sweat (A La La La La Long)"	—	—	—	—	—	—	—	—		Non-album single
2016	"Lost Paradise"	—	—	—	—	—	—	—	—		A Moment of Madness
2016	"Talking to You"	56	—	—	—	—	—	—	17		A Moment of Madness
2019	"Lights On"	—	—	—	—	—	—	—	—		Glita
2020	"Tough Pill"	—	—	—	—	—	—	—	—		The Things We Do For Love (unreleased)
2020	"Faded"	—	—	—	—	—	—	—	—		The Things We Do For Love (unreleased)
2022	"Dumb"	—	—	—	—	—	—	—	—		Don't Have to Say
2023	"Walk Away" (featuring Joe Devlin)	—	—	—	—	—	—	—	—		Don't Have to Say
2023	"Flower Power"	—	—	—	—	—	—	—	—		Don't Have to Say
2023	"Goodbye Hello"	—	—	—	—	—	—	—	—		Don't Have to Say
2024	"All Night Long" (with Kungs and David Guetta)	—	—	—	—	—	—	—	—	SNEP: Gold	Non-album singles
2024	"Alright" (with The Stickmen Project)	—	—	—	—	—	—	—	—		Non-album singles
2024	"Only Way Is Up" (with Robin Schulz)	—	—	36	—	—	—	—	—		Non-album singles
2025	"Lifeline" (with Jonas Blue)	—	—	—	—	—	—	—	—		TBA
2025	"Oh My Lord" (with Lucas & Steve and Lawrent)	—	—	—	—	—	—	—	—		TBA

==== As featured artist ====
Year	Title	Peak chart positions	Certifications	Album
Year	Title	UK	Certifications	Album
2017	"Bad Things" (Milky Chance featuring Izzy Bizu)	__		Blossom
2020	"Stop Crying Your Heart Out" (as BBC Radio 2's Allstars)	7		Non-album singles
2021	"Old School Flex" (Jords featuring D Double E and Izzy Bizu)	__		Non-album singles
2021	"Sad Boy" (Raaban and Wankelmut featuring Izzy Bizu)	__		Non-album singles
2022	"Wind Blows" (Blinkie featuring Izzy Bizu)	__		Non-album singles
2022	"Nine To Five" (Tom Enzy featuring Izzy Bizu)	__		Non-album singles
2022	"Life" (Ferreck Dawn featuring Izzy Bizu)	__		Non-album singles
2022	"Forgive Me" (ODESZA featuring Izzy Bizu)			The Last Goodbye
2023	"If I Live Forever" (Vintage Culture featuring Izzy Bizu)	__		Non-album single
2025	"More than Anybody" (Cheat Codes featuring Izzy Bizu and Kenny G)	__		Future Renaissance
"—" denotes a recording that did not chart or was not released in that territory.
