= Plutónio =

- Born: João Ricardo Azevedo; 28 June 1985 (age 41); Cascais, Portugal
- Genres: Hip hop tuga, R&B
- Occupations: Rapper, singer-songwriter
- Years active: 2000—present
- Label: Bridgetown Records

João Ricardo Azevedo (born 28 June 1985), mostly known for his stage name Plutónio or Plutonio, is a Portuguese rapper and hip-hop singer.

== Discography ==
=== Albums ===
Title	Details
Histórias da Minha Life	Released: 1 October 2013 (POR); Label: Soldier Music
Preto & Vermelho	Released: 3 June 2016 (POR); Label: Bridgetown
Sacrifício: Sangue, Lágrimas & Suor	Released: 22 November 2019 (POR); Label: Bridgetown

=== Singles ===
==== As lead artist ====
List of singles, with selected details and chart positions
Title	Year	Peak chart positions	Certifications	Album
Title	Year	POR	Certifications	Album
"Não Vales Nada"	2017	—		Non-album singles
"Preciso de Um Tempo"	2018	—		Non-album singles
"Meu Deus"	2019	2	AFP: 2× Platinum	Sacrifício: Sangue, Lágrimas & Suor
"Dramas & Dilemas"	2019	45		Sacrifício: Sangue, Lágrimas & Suor
"1 de Abril"	2019	5	AFP: 2× Platinum	Sacrifício: Sangue, Lágrimas & Suor
"Lucy Lucy"	2019	6	AFP: Gold	Sacrifício: Sangue, Lágrimas & Suor
"Vergonha Na Cara"	2019	8	AFP: Gold	Sacrifício: Sangue, Lágrimas & Suor
"Sacrifício"	2019	92		Sacrifício: Sangue, Lágrimas & Suor
"Somos Iguais"	2019	5		Sacrifício: Sangue, Lágrimas & Suor
"Mesmo Sítio"	2019	56		Sacrifício: Sangue, Lágrimas & Suor
"Sr. Guarda"	2019	74		Sacrifício: Sangue, Lágrimas & Suor
"Quando a Noite Cai"	2019	66		Sacrifício: Sangue, Lágrimas & Suor
"—" denotes a recording that did not chart or was not released in that territory.

==== As featured artist ====
List of singles as featured artist, with selected chart positions and certifications
Title	Year	Peak chart positions	Certifications	Album
Title	Year	POR	Certifications	Album
"Eyes Open" (Richie Campbell featuring Plutónio)	2018	95		Lisboa
"Rain" (Mishlawi featuring Richie Campbell and Plutónio)	2018	30	AFP: 2× Platinum	Non-album singles
"Cafeína" (DJ Dadda featuring Plutónio)	2018	1	AFP: 3× Platinum	Non-album singles
"Alô" (Dillaz featuring Plutónio)	2024	1		Non-album singles
"—" denotes a recording that did not chart or was not released in that territory.

== Awards ==
Year	Award	Nominee	Category	Result
2019	MTV Europe Music Award	Plutónio	Best Portuguese Act	Nominated
2021	MTV Europe Music Award	Plutónio	Best Portuguese Act	Nominated

== See also ==
- List of number-one singles of 2018 (Portugal)
