= Richie Campbell (singer) =

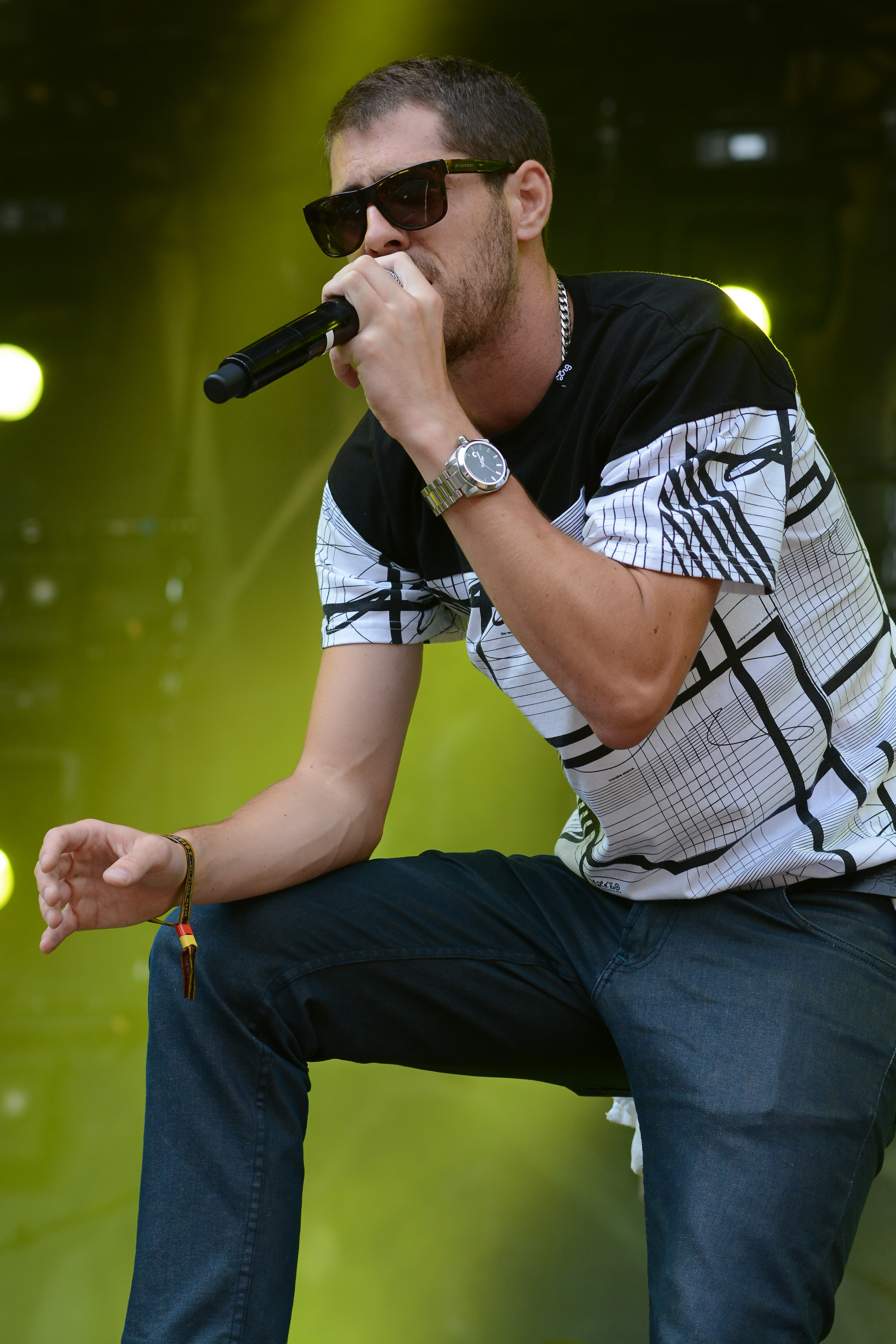
- Richie Campbell in 2014

Background information
- Born: Ricardo Dias de Lima Ventura da Costa; 25 November 1986 (age 39); Caxias, Portugal
- Origin: Portugal
- Genres: reggae, dancehall, R&B
- Years active: 2010-present
- Label: Sony Music; Bridgetown Records

Ricardo Dias de Lima Ventura da Costa (born 25 November 1986), more commonly known by his stagename Richie Campbell, is a Portuguese R&B, dancehall and reggae singer. He is considered a leading figure in the Portuguese music scene.

== Early life and career beginnings ==
Richie Campbell was born Ricardo Dias de Lima Ventura da Costa, in Mortágua. His musical career started with the band Stepacide; during that time he was also part of the project No Joke Sound System. He eventually left both projects so he could focus on his solo career. In 2010 he made his debut with the mixtape My Path, along with the homonymous EP Richie Campbell. In 2011, he became the first artist to fill Campo Pequeno without being signed to any recording label.

== Focused and international projection ==
The release of his debut album Focused in 2012 gave the artist international projection, with the track "That's How We Roll" standing out and being nominated at the 2013 Portuguese Golden Globes, in the "Best Music" category. The Focused Tour started in 2012; his last concert in Lisbon was recorded live at Campo Pequeno and released in CD and DVD in 2014. Richie Campbell was nominated for the MTV Europe Music Award for Best Portuguese Act at the 2013 and at the 2014 MTV Europe Music Awards.

On 4 May 2015, Campbell released his second studio album In the 876 without prior announcement. In the 876 was recorded in Kingston and Lisbon, its name being a reference to the Jamaican phone indicative.

In May 2016 Campbell released "Do You No Wrong", as part of the upcoming mixtape Lisboa. The single was certified platinum and was nominated for a Portuguese Golden Globe, in the "Best Music" category. Since then, Campbell has smoothly transitioned from reggae to R&B and dancehall as a reflex of Lisbon's growing music culture. That was a year of reinvention to Campbell, marked by the collaboration with the kizomba artist Nelson Freitas in “Break of Dawn”, the release of a remix of Rihanna's hit “Work”, and the success of “Do You Know Wrong”.

Lisboa, produced by Lhast, was released in December 2017 as a tribute to the city and its sound. "Heaven", co-produced by Campbell, "Midnight in Lisbon", "Water" and "Slowly" were the singles from the mixtape. Following this release, Campbell had his first gig at the Altice Arena, the country's biggest venue, in early 2018.

Lisboa was the most streamed album of 2018, in Portugal, and was the album with more certified singles (3 Platinum, 1 Gold).

== Artistry ==
Richie Campbell's earlier career predominantly focused on reggae, and he became the biggest name in the genre to come out of Portugal. In an early interview, Campbell named Tarrus Riley and Garnett Silk as inspirations for his work. In recent years, the artist has taken a step back from the genre, having explained that "Reggae is not in its best phase and, as a consumer, I'm not indifferent to that". The recording of Lisboa was a period of transition for Campbell, that saw him starting to incorporate elements from dancehall and R&B in his work.

== Discography ==
=== Albums ===
- My Path (CD, 2010)
- Focused (CD, 2012)
- Live at Campo Pequeno (CD+DVD, 2014)
- In the 876 (2015)
- Lisboa (2017)
- Heartbreak & Other Stories (2023)
- Elephant In The Room (2026)

=== EPs ===
- Richie Campbell (2010)
- Come quarantine w me (2020)
- IT WILL HURT BOTH WAYS (2024)

=== Singles ===
- "Talk Sweet", "Society", "Inna Jamaica" featuring Mellow Mood, "Sacrifice My Life", "Whoa", "More than Air", "It Takes a Revolucion" featuring Anthony B, "Think About Life", "Hate on Me Now", "I'm Going", "Gonna Leave You", "Angel Is by My Side" featuring Turbulence, "Good for Me", "Chill", "Get with You", "Missing You", "Love Story", "What a Day", "Love Me So", "All About You", "Piece of Bread", "Don't Panic", "Please", "Nah Run Again"
- "Everytime I Cry" (2010)
- "Blame It on Me" (2011)
- "That's How We Roll" (2012)
- "Love Is an Addiction" featuring Ikaya (2012)
- "Focused" featuring Dengaz (2012)
- "Man Don't Cry" (2014)
- "420" (2014)
- "Best Friend" (2015)
- "Do You No Wrong" (2016)
- "Love Donald Duck" (2017)
- "Heaven" (2017)
- "Midnight In Lisbon" (2017)
- "Just One of Those Days (Freestyle)" (2019)
- "This Time" (2020)
- "The City is a Jungle" (2020)
- "Tsunami" featuring Gson (2021)
- "Shake" (2021)
- "Do You No Wrong" (2023)
- "Let You Go" (2023)
- "Love Again" (2023)
- "Heartless" (2023)
- "Obeah Me" (2024)
- "Before I Lose My Voice" (2024)
- "Insomnia" (2025)
- "SWEET LIKE SUGAR" (2025)
- "You" (2026)
- "C'est La Vie" (ft. Plutonio) (2026)
- "Elephant In The Room" (2026)
- "Look What You’ve Done" (2026)

=== Features ===
- Boohoo - Mishlawi ft. Richie Campbell; 2016
- Rain - Mishlawi ft. Richie Campbell, Plutónio; 2018
- Even - Van Zee ft. Richie Campbell; 2024
