= Don Diablo discography =

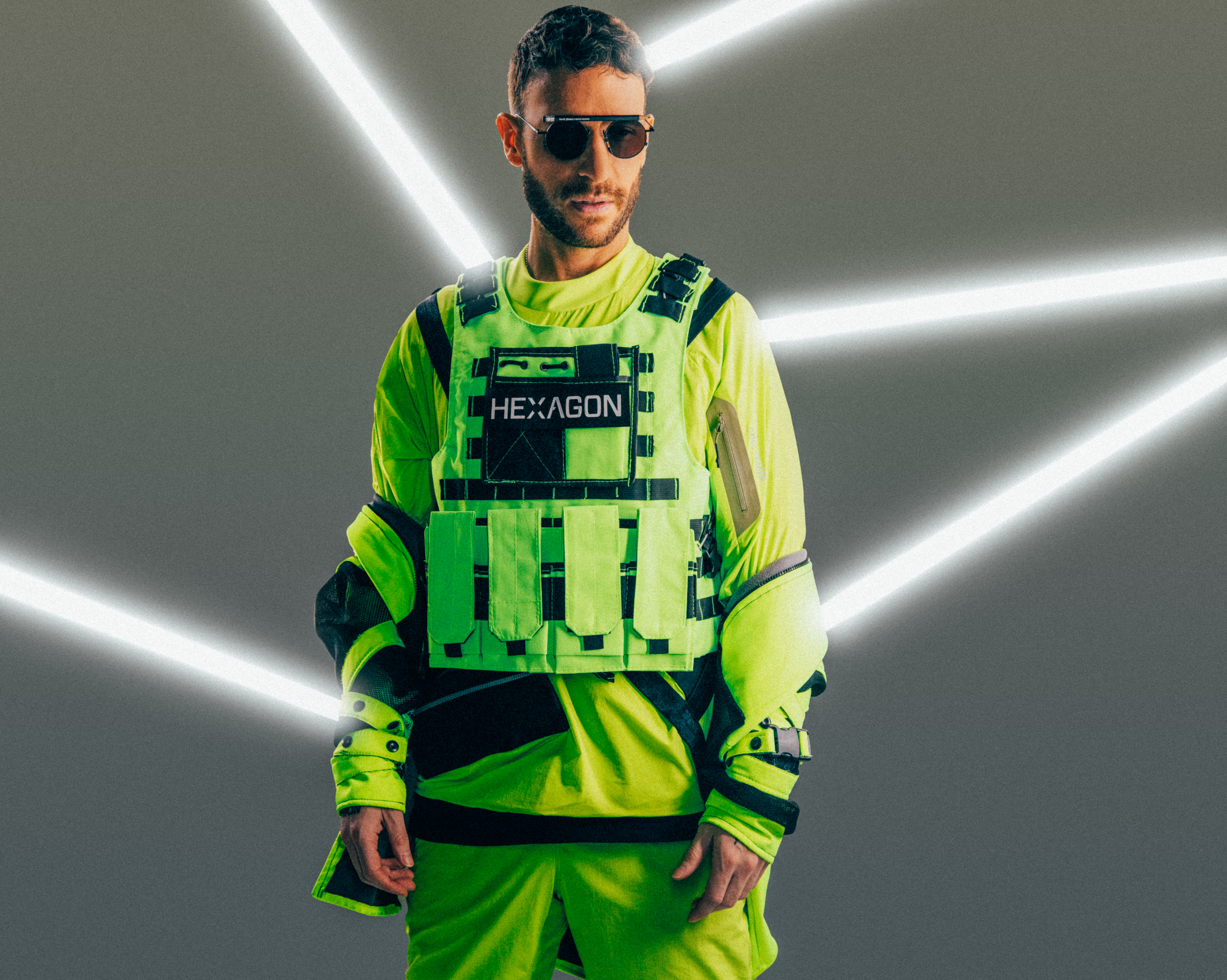
- Don Diablo
- Studio albums: 3
- Compilation albums: 6
- Singles: 78
- Remix albums: 3
- Remixes: 68

This is the discography for Dutch electronic musician Don Diablo.

== Albums ==
=== Studio albums ===
Title	Details	Peak
Title	Details	NLD
2 Faced	Label: ID&T; Format: CD (2004), digital download (2010)	—
Life Is a Festival	Label: Sony BMG; Format: CD (2008), digital download (2010)	37
Future	Released: 9 February 2018; Label: Hexagon; Format: CD, digital download	92
Forever	Released: 10 September 2021; Label: Hexagon; Format: Digital download	—
Flux	Scheduled: 2026; Label: Format:	—
"—" denotes an album that did not chart or was not released.

=== Compilation albums ===
Album	Year	Label	Peak position
Album	Year	Label	NLD
M8 Worldwide Volume Nine - Storming (Note: Given away free with the November 2002 issue of M8 Magazine)	2002	M8 Magazine	—
Sellout Sessions 01	2005	Sellout Sessions	—
Sellout Sessions 02	2008	Sellout Sessions	—
Sellout Sessions 3	2009	Sony Music	28
Drive-By Disco (Note: Free covermount CD from DJ Magazine April 2009 Issue 472)	2009	DJ Magazine	—
Past.Present.Future	2017	Hexagon	—
"—" denotes a recording that did not chart or was not released.

=== Remix albums ===
Title	Year	Label
The Face of a New Generation	2007	Sellout Sessions
Reconstructions	2018	Hexagon
Reconstructions Part II	2021	Hexagon

== Extended plays ==
Title	Details
Monster (with Sidney Samson)	Released: 8 March 2010; Label: Sellout Sessions; Format: Digital download

== Singles ==
List of singles, with selected chart positions and certifications, showing year released and album name
Title	Year	Peak chart positions									Certifications	Album
Title	Year	NLD	NLD 40	BEL (FL)	BEL (WA)	CIS	FRA	POL	SWE	UK	Certifications	Album
"Cloud No. 9"	2002	—	—	—	—	—	—	—	—	—		Non-album singles
"Anarchy"	2003	—	—	—	—	—	—	—	—	—		Non-album singles
"Useless"	2003	36	—	—	—	—	—	—	—	—		2Faced
"Fade Away (Round & Round)"	2004	98	—	—	—	—	—	—	—	—		2Faced
"The Music and the People" (Divided featuring Don Diablo)	2004	38	—	—	—	—	—	—	—	—		Non-album singles
"Easy Lover" (Don Diablo presents Divided)	2005	45	—	43	—	—	—	—	—	—		Non-album singles
"Blow" (Note: Re-released in 2007 (digitally on 8 February 2011) through Gusto Records without crediting The Beatkidz) (featuring The Beatkidz)	2005	26	—	—	—	—	—	—	—	—		Sellout Sessions 01
"Never Too Late (To Die)"	2006	46	—	—	—	—	—	—	—	—		Non-album single
"I Need to Know" (Note: Single includes B-side track "Sudderen (Dubbel Dik)" (with Kubus featuring Extince), which has not charted nor is included in the album) (featuring Shystie)	2006	74	—	—	—	—	—	—	—	—		Life Is a Festival
"Who's Your Daddy"	2006	25	10	—	—	—	—	—	—	—		Life Is a Festival
"Stand Up"	2007	61	—	—	—	—	—	—	—	—		Life Is a Festival
"Pain Is Temporary, Pride Is Forever"	2007	42	—	—	—	—	—	—	—	—		Life Is a Festival
"This Way (Too Many Times)" (featuring Bizzey)	2007	28	5	—	—	—	—	—	—	—		Life Is a Festival
"Give It Up" (with Public Enemy)	2008	—	—	—	—	—	—	—	—	—		Non-album single
"Dancefloor Drama #001"	2008	—	—	—	—	—	—	—	—	—		Sellout Sessions 02 (Note: Two of the tracks from the single/EP, the A-side track "Streets of Fire" (with Grand Jackson) and the bonus track "The Truth is No Good to Me", appear on the compilation album)
"We'll Dance" (with Moke)	2008	—	—	—	—	—	—	—	—	—		Non-album single
"Music Is My Life" (featuring Bizzey)	2008	—	—	—	—	—	—	—	—	—		Life Is a Festival
"Hooligans Never Surrender"	2008	—	—	—	—	—	—	—	—	—		Life Is a Festival
"Life Is a Festival"	2008	82	—	—	—	—	—	—	—	—		Life Is a Festival
"Audio Endlessly" (with Viva City)	2009	—	—	—	—	—	—	—	—	—		Sellout Sessions 02
"Too Cool for School"	2009	—	—	—	—	—	—	—	—	—		Sellout Sessions 3
"Disco Disco Disco"	2009	—	—	—	—	—	—	—	—	—		Sellout Sessions 3
"Hooligans" (featuring Example)	2009	—	—	—	—	—	—	—	—	15		Won't Go Quietly
"Never Too Late"	2009	—	—	—	—	—	—	—	—	—		Life Is a Festival
"I Am Not from France"	2009	—	—	—	—	—	—	—	—	—		Life Is a Festival
"Teen Scream Machine"	2010	—	—	—	—	—	—	—	—	—		Sellout Sessions 3
"Who's Your Daddy" (Note: Rework of the 2006 song of the same name; released along with 2 remix packages)	2010	—	—	—	—	—	—	—	—	—		Non-album singles
"Animale" (featuring Dragonette)	2010	33	—	52	—	—	—	—	—	—		Non-album singles
"Make You Pop" (with Diplo)	2010	—	—	—	—	—	—	—	—	—		Non-album singles
"Mezelluf"	2011	—	—	—	—	—	—	—	—	—		Non-album singles
"Make You Pop" (Reprise) (with Diplo)	2012	—	—	—	—	—	—	—	—	—		Non-album singles
"Silent Shadows"	2012	—	—	—	—	—	—	—	—	—		Non-album singles
"Lights Out Hit" (featuring Angela Hunte)	2012	—	—	—	—	—	—	—	—	—		Lights Out EP
"The Golden Years"	2012	—	—	—	—	—	—	—	—	—		Lights Out EP
"Cell" (Soundtrack Bellicher: Cel)	2012	—	—	—	—	—	—	—	—	—		Non-album singles
"The Artist Inside" (featuring JP Cooper)	2012	26	—	—	—	—	—	—	—	—		Non-album singles
"M1 Stinger" (featuring Noonie Bao)	2012	—	—	—	—	—	—	—	—	—		M1 Stinger EP
"Give It All" (featuring Alex Clare and Kelis)	2013	—	—	—	—	—	—	—	—	—		Non-album singles
"Give It All" (Don Diablo and CID Remix)	2013	—	—	—	—	—	—	—	—	—		Non-album singles
"Starlight (Could You Be Mine)" (with Matt Nash)	2013	—	19	—	—	—	—	—	—	—		Non-album singles
"Prototype" (with CID)	2013	—	—	—	—	—	—	—	—	—		Non-album singles
"Edge of the Earth" (Theme from The New Wilderness)	2013	—	19	—	—	—	—	—	—	—		Non-album singles
"Origins"	2013	—	—	—	—	—	—	—	—	—		Non-album singles
"Got Me Thinkin'" (with CID)	2013	—	—	—	—	—	—	—	—	—		Non-album singles
"Black Mask"	2014	—	—	—	—	—	—	—	—	—		Non-album singles
"Knight Time"	2014	—	—	—	—	—	—	—	—	—		Non-album singles
"Anytime"	2014	—	—	121	—	—	—	—	—	—		Non-album singles
"Back in Time"	2014	—	—	—	—	—	—	—	—	—		Non-album singles
"Back to Life"	2014	—	—	—	—	—	—	—	—	—		Non-album singles
"King Cobra" (with Yves V)	2014	—	—	—	—	—	—	—	—	—		Non-album singles
"Generations"	2014	—	—	—	—	—	—	—	—	—		Non-album singles
"Chain Reaction (Domino)" (featuring Kris Kiss)	2015	—	—	—	—	—	—	—	—	—		Non-album singles
"My Window" (featuring Maluca)	2015	—	—	—	—	—	—	—	—	—		Non-album singles
"Universe" (featuring Emeni)	2015	—	—	—	—	—	—	—	—	—		Non-album singles
"On My Mind"	2015	—	—	—	—	—	—	—	—	—		Non-album singles
"Chemicals" (with Tiësto featuring Thomas Troelsen)	2015	—	8	76	—	—	—	45	84	—		Non-album singles
"Got the Love" (with Khrebto)	2015	—	—	93	—	—	—	—	—	—		Non-album singles
"I'll House You" (featuring Jungle Brothers)	2015	—	—	—	—	—	—	—	—	—		Non-album singles
"Tonight"	2016	—	—	—	—	—	—	—	—	—		Non-album singles
"Drifter" (featuring DYU)	2016	—	—	—	—	—	—	—	—	—		Non-album singles
"Silence"	2016	—	—	— (Note: "Silence" did not enter the Flanders Ultratop 50, but did enter the Ultratip chart.)	—	—	—	—	—	—		Non-album singles
"What We Started" (with Steve Aoki and Lush & Simon featuring BullySongs)	2016	—	—	—	63	—	—	—	—	—		Non-album singles
"Cutting Shapes"	2016	—	—	—	66	—	83	—	—	—		Non-album singles
"Switch"	2017	—	—	—	—	—	—	—	—	—		Non-album singles
"Children of a Miracle" (with Marnik)	2017	—	—	—	91	132	—	—	—	—		Non-album singles
"Save a Little Love"	2017	—	—	— (Note: "Save a Little Love" did not enter the Flanders Ultratop 50, but did enter the Ultratip chart.)	—	184	—	—	—	—		Future
"Momentum"	2017	—	—	—	—	55	—	—	—	—		Future
"Don't Let Go" (featuring Holly Winter)	2017	—	—	—	— (Note: "Don't Let Go" did not enter the Walloon Ultratop 50, but did enter the Ultratip chart.)	—	—	—	—	—		Future
"Take Her Place" (featuring A R I Z O N A)	2017	—	—	—	—	—	—	—	—	—		Future
"You Can't Change Me"	2017	—	—	— (Note: "You Can't Change Me" did not enter the Flanders Ultratop 50, but did enter the Ultratip chart.)	— (Note: "Don't Let Go" did not enter the Walloon Ultratop 50, but did enter the Ultratip chart.)	—	129	—	—	—		Future
"People Say" (featuring Paije)	2018	—	—	—	—	—	—	—	—	—		Future
"Everybody's Somebody" (featuring BullySongs)	2018	—	—	—	— (Note: "Don't Let Go" did not enter the Walloon Ultratop 50, but did enter the Ultratip chart.)	—	—	—	—	—		Future
"Head Up" (featuring James Newman)	2018	—	—	—	—	—	—	—	—	—		Future
"Believe" (featuring Ansel Elgort)	2018	—	—	—	—	—	—	—	—	—		Future
"Give Me Love" (featuring Calum Scott)	2018	—	—	—	—	—	—	—	—	—		Future
"Wake Me When It's Quiet" (with Hilda)	2018	—	—	—	—	—	—	—	—	—		Non-album singles
"Anthem (We Love House Music)"	2018	—	—	—	—	—	—	—	—	—		Non-album singles
"No Good" (with Zonderling)	2018	—	—	—	—	—	—	—	—	—		Non-album singles
"Heaven to Me" (featuring Alex Clare)	2018	—	—	—	—	—	—	—	—	—		Non-album singles
"Survive" (featuring Emeli Sandé and Gucci Mane)	2018	—	—	—	—	6	—	1	—	—	ZPAV: 3× Platinum	Forever
"I Got Love" (featuring Nate Dogg)	2018	—	—	—	—	—	—	—	—	—		Non-album singles
"You're Not Alone" (featuring Kiiara)	2019	—	—	—	—	—	—	—	—	—		Non-album singles
"Fever" (with CID)	2019	—	—	—	—	—	—	—	—	—		Non-album singles
"Brave" (with Jessie J)	2019	—	—	—	—	—	—	—	—	—		Non-album singles
"The Rhythm"	2019	—	—	—	—	—	—	—	—	—		Non-album singles
"The Same Way" (featuring Kifi)	2019	—	—	—	—	—	—	—	—	—		Non-album singles
"Never Change"	2019	—	—	—	—	—	—	—	—	—		Non-album singles
"UFO" (featuring Eldzhey)	2019	—	—	—	—	39	—	—	—	—		Non-album singles
"Congratulations" (featuring Brando)	2019	—	—	—	—	188	—	32	—	—		Non-album singles
"We Are Love"	2020	—	—	—	—	—	—	—	—	—		Non-album singles
"Bad" (featuring Zak Abel)	2020	—	—	—	38	—	—	28	—	—	ZPAV: 2× Platinum	Forever
"Inside My Head (Voices)"	2020	—	—	—	—	—	—	—	—	—		Non-album single
"Thousand Faces" (with Andy Grammer)	2020	—	—	—	—	—	—	—	—	—		Forever
"Mr. Brightside"	2020	—	—	—	—	—	—	—	—	—		Non-album singles
"Johnny's Online" (with Denzel Chain as Camp Kubrick)	2020	—	—	—	—	—	—	—	—	—		Non-album singles
"Invincible"	2020	—	—	—	—	—	—	—	—	—		Forever
"Kill Me Better" (with Imanbek featuring Trevor Daniel)	2020	—	—	—	—	—	—	—	—	—		Forever
"Into the Unknown"	2021	—	—	—	—	—	—	—	—	—		Forever
"Problems" (with JLV featuring John K)	2021	—	—	—	—	—	—	—	—	—		Forever
"Eyes Closed"	2021	—	—	—	—	—	—	—	—	—		Non-album single
"Through The Storm" (featuring Jordan Mackampa)	2021	—	—	—	—	—	—	—	—	—		Forever
"Too Much To Ask" (with Ty Dolla Sign)	2021	—	—	—	—	—	—	—	—	—		Forever
"Tears for Later" (with Galantis)	2021	—	—	—	—	—	—	—	—	—		Forever
"Hot Air Balloon" (with Ar/Co)	2021	—	—	—	—	—	—	—	—	—		Forever
"Cheque"	2021	—	—	—	—	—	—	—	—	—		Forever
"Face to Face" (featuring Watts)	2022	—	—	—	—	—	—	—	—	—		Non-album singles
"Gotta Let U Go" (with Dominica)	2022	—	—	—	—	—	—	—	—	—		Non-album singles
"Day & Nite"	2022	—	—	—	—	—	—	—	—	—		Non-album singles
"No Piensa" (featuring PnB Rock & Boaz van de Beatz)	2022	—	—	—	—	—	—	—	—	—		Non-album singles
"All That You Need"	2022	—	—	—	—	—	—	—	—	—		Non-album singles
"2 Things"	2022	—	—	—	—	—	—	—	—	—		Non-album singles
"Journey (Take Me Where You Wanna)"	2022	—	—	—	—	—	—	—	—	—		Non-album singles
"Not Alone" (with Azteck)	2023	—	—	—	—	—	—	—	—	—		Non-album singles
"Beyond the Fire"	2023	—	—	—	—	—	—	—	—	—		Non-album singles
"Lucky Ones"	2023	—	—	—	—	—	—	—	—	—		Non-album singles
"Feelings"	2023	—	—	—	—	—	—	—	—	—		Non-album singles
"Deja Vu"	2023	—	—	—	—	—	—	—	—	—		Non-album singles
"Golden"	2023	—	—	—	—	—	—	—	—	—		Non-album singles
"Stop Loving You"	2023	—	—	—	—	—	—	—	—	—		Non-album singles
"Sunglasses At Night" (with Gabry Ponte)	2023	—	—	—	—	—	—	—	—	—		Non-album singles
"Still Cutting Shapes"	2023	—	—	—	—	—	—	—	—	—		Non-album singles
"Future Rain" (with Tony Ann)	2023	—	—	—	—	—	—	—	—	—		Non-album singles
"Set Me Free" (with RetroVision)	2023	—	—	—	—	—	—	—	—	—		Non-album singles
"Let Me Love You"	2023	—	—	—	—	—	—	—	—	—		Non-album singles
"Got That" (featuring Scrufizzer)	2023	—	—	—	—	—	—	—	—	—		Non-album singles
"Dangerous" (with Paolo Pellegrino)	2023	—	—	—	—	—	—	—	—	—		Non-album singles
"Only God Knows" (featuring ECHoBOY)	2024	—	—	—	—	—	—	—	—	—		Non-album singles
"WTF R U!?" (with Lucky Luke)	2024	—	—	—	—	—	—	—	—	—		Non-album singles
"Physique" (with MEARSY, featuring RBZ)	2024	—	—	—	—	—	—	—	—	—		Non-album singles
"Jiggy Woogie" (with Major Lazer & Baby Lawd)	2024	—	—	—	—	—	—	—	—	—		Non-album singles
"Monster" (with Felix Jaehn)	2024	—	—	—	—	—	—	—	—	—		Non-album singles
"Beast Mode (Knock You Out)"	2024	—	—	—	—	—	—	—	—	—		Non-album singles
"Smalltown Boy"	2024	—	—	—	—	—	—	—	—	—		Non-album singles
"Disco Marathon" (with R3hab, featuring Neeka)	2024	—	—	—	—	—	—	—	—	—		Non-album singles
"SexyBack"	2024	—	—	—	—	—	—	—	—	—		Non-album singles
"Where Do We Come From" (with Lufthaus, featuring Sofiya Nzau)	2024	—	—	—	—	—	—	—	—	—		Non-album singles
"Deeper Underground" (with Jamiroquai)	2024	—	—	—	—	—	—	—	—	—		Non-album singles
"Young Again" (with Sandro Cavazza)	2024	—	—	—	—	—	—	—	—	—		Non-album singles
"Young Again (Acoustic Version)" (with Sandro Cavazza)	2024	—	—	—	—	—	—	—	—	—		Non-album singles
"Keep Pushin' (Beast)" (with P Money)	2024	—	—	—	—	—	—	—	—	—		Non-album singles
"Next to Me" (with MK featuring, Gaby Gerlis)	2024	—	—	—	—	—	—	—	—	—		Non-album singles
"The Way I Are"	2025	—	—	—	—	—	—	—	—	—		Non-album singles
"Remember Me" (with Qobra)	2025	—	—	—	—	—	—	—	—	—		Non-album singles
"Doing Nothin'" (with Nelly Furtado)	2025	—	—	—	—	—	—	—	—	—		Non-album singles
"‘Go Home With a Stranger" (featuring Wiz Khalifa and Chri$tian Gate$)	2026	—	—	—	—	—	—	—	—	—		Flux
"—" denotes a single that did not chart or was not released.

== Soundtracks and theme songs ==
- 2008 "Life is a Festival" (Radeloos Soundtrack)
- 2012: "Cell" (Soundtrack Bellicher: Cel)
- 2013: "Edge of the Earth" (Theme from The New Wilderness)
- 2013: "Origins" (the official title track of Batman: Arkham Origins)
- 2017: "Echoes" (Theme from Kill Switch)
- 2020: "Invincible" (Theme from AFK Arena)

== Remixes ==
Remixes by Don Diablo.

Year	Artist	Title
2003	Sean Paul	"Get Busy"
2003	Laidback Luke (featuring MC Marxman)	"We Can Not Get Enough"
2004	Dance Valley	"A Decade of Dance"
2005	Voidd	"Better Girl"
2005	MV (featuring Hannah)	"Mr. Roboto"
2006	2 Faced	"Rock Music"
2006	Coburn	"We Interrupt This Program"
2006	Kraak & Smaak	"Money in the Bag"
2007	Mason	"You Make Me Wanna Dance"
2007	Imaginary Friends	"Cheap Rocks"
2007	The Young Punx	"Your Music is Killing Me"
2007	Laidback Luke (featuring MC Goodgri)	"Rocking with the Best"
2007	Newton Faulkner	"Dream Catch Me"
2007	Ron Carroll	"Walking Down the Street"
2007	Public Enemy vs. Don Diablo	"Give It Up"
2008	Kaseo	"Kill the Radio"
2008	Tami Chynn (featuring Akon)	"Frozen"
2009	Rudenko	"Everybody"
2009	J-Cast	"It's Just Begun Again"
2009	Kaz James (featuring Macy Gray)	"Can't Hold Back"
2009	Tila Tequila	"I Love U"
2009	Walter Meego	"Girls"
2009	The BPA (featuring Iggy Pop)	"He's Frank"
2009	Plump DJs	"Beat Myself Up"
2009	Cagedbaby	"Forced"
2009	Stereo MCs	"Show Your Light"
2009	Dragonette	"Fixin to Thrill"
2009	Little Man Tate	"I Am Alive"
2009	Scanners	"Salvation"
2009	Linus Loves	"Prom Night"
2009	One eskimO	"Givin' Up"
2009	Heads We Dance	"When the Sirens Sound"
2009	Plushgun	"A Crush to Pass the Time"
2009	Example	"Girl Can't Dance"
2009	Frankmusik	"Confusion Girl"
2009	Master Shortie	"Dead End"
2009	Mika	"We Are Golden"
2010	Cassius	"Youth, Speed, Trouble, Cigarettes"
2010	The Chemical Brothers	"Swoon"
2010	Gorillaz	"Superfast Jellyfish"
2010	Rox	"I Don't Believe"
2010	Pete Lawrie	"All That We Keep"
2011	Tinie Tempah (featuring Wiz Khalifa)	"Till I'm Gone"
2012	The Other Tribe	"Skirts"
2012	Justice	"Helix"
2012	Labrinth	"Express Yourself"
2013	Nicky Romero vs. Krewella	"Legacy" (featuring Sway)
2014	The Chainsmokers (featuring sirenXX)	"Kanye"
2014	R3HAB and Nervo (featuring Ayah Marar)	"Ready for the Weekend"
2014	Ed Sheeran	"Don't"
2014	Jessie J (featuring 2 Chainz)	"Burnin' Up"
2014	Marlon Roudette	"When the Beat Drops Out"
2015	Alex Adair	"Make Me Feel Better" (Don Diablo and CID Remix)
2015	Lethal Bizzle	"Fester Skank"
2015	King Arthur (featuring Michael Meaco)	"Belong to the Rhythm" (Don Diablo Edit)
2015	Blonde (featuring Alex Newell)	"All Cried Out"
2015	Madonna	"Ghosttown"
2015	Rudimental	"Never Let You Go"
2015	The Wombats	"Give Me A Try"
2015	Tiesto and KSHMR (featuring Vassy)	"Secrets"
2015	Jungle Brothers	"I'll House You" (Don Diablo VIP Remix)
2016	Birdy	"Keeping Your Head Up"
2016	Corderoy	"Close My Eyes" (Don Diablo Edit)
2016	Bastille	"Good Grief"
2016	Rihanna	"Love on the Brain"
2016	DJ Snake (featuring Justin Bieber)	"Let Me Love You"
2017	Zonderling	"Tunnel Vision" (Don Diablo Edit)
2017	The Chainsmokers and Coldplay	"Something Just Like This"
2018	Kygo	"Kids In Love"
2018	Big Pineapple	"Another Chance" (Don Diablo Edit)
2018	Martin Garrix	"Ocean"
2018	MØ and Diplo	"Sun In Our Eyes"
2018	Big Pineapple	"Another Chance" (Don Diablo Chill Mix)
2018	Don Diablo (featuring Emeli Sandé and Gucci Mane)	"Survive" (VIP Mix)
2019	Panic! at the Disco	"High Hopes"
2019	Keanu Silva	"King of My Castle" (Don Diablo Edit)
2019	Mark Ronson (featuring Miley Cyrus)	"Nothing Breaks Like a Heart"
2019	Don Diablo (featuring Kiiara)	You're Not Alone (VIP Mix)
2019	Ellie Goulding	"Sixteen"
2019	Don Diablo and Jessie J	"Brave" (VIP Mix)
2019	Zara Larsson	"All the Time" (Don Diablo Remix)
2019	David Guetta and Martin Solveig	"Thing for You" (Don Diablo Remix)
2019	John Christian	"Club Bizarre" (Don Diablo Edit)
2020	Don Diablo	"Congratulations" (VIP Mix)
2020	Anne-Marie	"Birthday" (Don Diablo Remix)
2020	Ali Gatie	"What If I Told You That I Love You" (Don Diablo Remix)
2020	Danny Olson (featuring JT Roach)	"Hide and Seek" (Don Diablo Edit)
2020	Robin Schulz and Wes	"Alane" (Don Diablo Remix)
2020	Don Diablo and Imanbek (featuring Trevor Daniel)	"Kill Me Better" (VIP Mix)
2020	Dua Lipa (featuring DaBaby)	"Levitating" (Don Diablo Remix)
2021	Don Diablo (featuring Ty Dolla Sign)	"Too Much To Ask" (VIP Mix)
2021	Don Diablo & Freak Fantastique	"Stay Awake" (VIP Mix)
2022	The Chainsmokers	"High" (Don Diablo Remix)
2022	Don Diablo	"Day & Nite" (VIP Mix)
2022	Avicii & Sebastien Drums	"My Feelings for You" (Don Diablo Remix)
2022	Don Diablo (featuring PnB Rock & Boaz van de Beatz)	"No Piensa" (VIP Mix)
2023	Egzod & Maestro Chives	"Royalty" (Don Diablo Remix)
2023	Don Diablo & Azteck	"Not Alone" (VIP Mix)
2024	Ateez x Don Diablo	"Work Pt. 2"
2025	Don Diablo	"Lose Control"
