= Won't Go Quietly (disambiguation) =

Won't Go Quietly is a 2010 album by Example.

Won't Go Quietly may also refer to:

- "Won't Go Quietly (song)", a song by Example from the 2010 album of the same name
- "Won't Go Quietly", a song by All That Remains from the 2010 album For We Are Many
