= Cutting Shapes =

Single by Don Diablo
- Released: 7 October 2016
- Genre: Future house
- Length: 2:59
- Label: HEXAGON; Spinnin'
- Songwriters: Don Pepijn Schipper: Aaron Jerome Smith; Martin van Sonderen; Shalyn Walker

Don Diablo singles chronology
"What We Started" (2016)	"Cutting Shapes" (2016)	"Switch" (2017)

"Cutting Shapes" is a song by Dutch DJ Don Diablo. It was released on 7 October 2016 via Diablo's HEXAGON label.

== Background ==
The track is based on the Cutting Shapes dance style, and it features GabbyJDavid, an American Shaper.

The drop was described as "crunchy, wavy, bass-heavy and super energetic." As the song received many requests for an official release, Don said "I was literally getting so many requests to release the record that I decided to clear the sample and finish it off properly."

== Track listing ==
Singles
No.	Title	Length
1.	"Cutting Shapes"	2:59
2.	"Cutting Shapes" (extended mix)	4:02

== Music video ==
The music video features Gabby J David dancing Cutting Shapes and Don Diablo performing various tasks in the background.

== Charts ==
Chart (2016)	Peak position
Belgium (Ultratip Bubbling Under Wallonia)	16
France (SNEP)	84
