= Give It All (disambiguation) =

"Give It All" is a 2004 song by Rise Against.

Give It All may also refer to:

- "Give It All" (Train song), 2015
- "Give It All", a song by the Amity Affliction from Let the Ocean Take Me
- "Give It All", a song by Don Diablo
- "Give It All", a song by Ratt from Invasion of Your Privacy
- Give It All (film), a 1998 Japanese film

== See also ==
- Give It All Away (disambiguation)
