= Thousand Faces =

Thousand Faces or A Thousand Faces may refer to:

- "A Thousand Faces", a song from Creed's album Full Circle
- "Thousand Faces", a single by Don Diablo
- The Hero with a Thousand Faces, a book about comparative mythology
- Man of a Thousand Faces (film), a 1957 American dramatic film
