= Last Ones Standing =

Single by Example

from the album Won't Go Quietly
- Released: 12 September 2010
- Recorded: 2009
- Genre: Dance-pop
- Length: 3:27
- Label: Data
- Songwriter(s): Example
- Producer(s): Bjorn Yttling

Example singles chronology
"Kickstarts" (2010)	"Last Ones Standing" (2010)	"Monster" (2010)

"Last Ones Standing" is a song by British recording artist Example. This is the fourth single from Example's second album, Won't Go Quietly. The song was available to download on 12 September 2010, with a physical single release on 13 September 2010. Production was handled by Bjorn Yttling of Swedish rock band, Peter Bjorn and John.

== Critical reception ==
Fraser McAlpine of BBC Chart Blog gave the song a positive review stating:

It's a tough one to call, isn't it? Because on the surface of it, it's not like this song contains music which is SO amazingly distracting that it simply cannot be ignored, even if you are up to the most exciting chapter in The Expert's Guide To Newt Management. Or at least, not more distracting than other modern forms of popular song. Mind you, it does start with those stabby synths, an introduction that dramatic has to be an attention-grabber. And once the ear has been pricked, that's a good place to jump in with your little tales of bad behaviour. It's nice that the taxi-driver they've just run away from has the chance to offer a disapproving little grunt too. That's inclusive. People like to feel included. And he sings the first bit, thus drawing in the rap-phobics, before hitting them full in the face with his lyrical flow. It's like he's saying "yeah, you want to know why we don't sit in the seats when we're on the tube? Well you're gonna have to put up with THIS RAPPING FIRST". So by the time we get to the chorus, he's treated us mean, he's kept us keen, and then, the double-whammy: stabby synths AND singing AND a drunken arm around the shoulder leading us outside for a night of pure silliness..

== Track listing ==
Digital download
No.	Title	Length
1.	"Last Ones Standing"	3:27
2.	"Last Ones Standing" (Extended Mix)	5:31
3.	"Last Ones Standing" (Benny Benassi Remix)	6:19
4.	"Last Ones Standing" (Manhattan Clique Remix)	5:54
5.	"Last Ones Standing" (TC Remix)	5:21
6.	"Last Ones Standing" (Doctor P Remix)	5:25
7.	"Last Ones Standing" (Devil's Gun Remix)	4:21

== Chart performance ==
"Last Ones Standing" was first seen on the UK Singles Chart when it debuted at number 158 on 28 August 2010. The following week, the single jumped an amazing 88 places to number 70. Upon official release; the single climbed a further 43 places to number 27; marking Example's fourth consecutive Top 40 hit; although the lowest peaking of these.

The single also made early appearances on other UK charts, including the UK Dance Chart; in which "Last Ones Standing" was first seen at number 29 on 21 August 2010; managing to eventually peak at number 7 upon release. Likewise, the single was seen prematurely on the UK Indie Chart at number 30 on 15 August 2010; eventually peaking at number 3.

On 16 September 2010 the single debuted at number 44 on the Irish Singles Chart, becoming the third of Example's singles to do so; the other two being "Won't Go Quietly" and "Kickstarts". The following week, the single climbed 7 places to number 37; the current peak of the single.

== Charts ==
Chart (2010)	Peak position
Ireland (IRMA)	37
Scotland (OCC)	25
UK Dance (OCC)	7
UK Indie (OCC)	3
UK Singles (OCC)	27

== Release history ==
Region	Date	Format
Ireland	12 September 2010	Digital download
United Kingdom	12 September 2010	Digital download
