= Everybody (Rudenko song) =

Single by Rudenko
- Released: 16 February 2009 (UK)
- Recorded: 2008
- Genre: Dance
- Length: 2:50 (radio edit)
- Label: Data
- Songwriter(s): Leonid Rudenko; Kelly Barnes; Alexander Perls

"Everybody" is a dance single by Russian DJ Leonid Rudenko. The song features vocals from Kelly Barnes, a Los Angeles singer from the band Ragsy. The unofficial remix shown on UK music stations, such as Kiss, samples the song "Cop That Shit", by Timbaland & Magoo featuring Missy Elliott. Charleene Rená starred in the music video.

== Chart performance ==
On its first week of release, the song peaked at a position of number 24 in the UK Singles Chart and number 2 in the UK Dance Chart, but it only appeared in the Top 75 Singles Chart for 3 weeks. Despite an average chart position, the video proved very popular amongst music stations such as 4Music, where it rose to number 4 on its 'Today's 4Music Top 10' chart and was rotated heavily on music stations such as The Box, MTV Dance, Flaunt and Clubland TV.

== Track listing ==
- EU CD maxi single
1. "Everybody" (Radio Mix) — 2:44
2. "Everybody" (Club Mix) — 5:53
3. "Everybody" (Dabruck & Klein Remix) — 7:09
4. "Everybody" (Bass Slammers Remix) — 5:44
- UK CD 1
1. "Everybody" (Radio Edit) — 2:44
2. "Everybody" (Morjac Edit) — 6:27
- UK CD 2
1. "Everybody" (Club Mix) — 5:59
2. "Everybody" (Darbuck & Klein Remix) — 7:10
3. "Everybody" (Morjac Remix) — 6:27
4. "Everybody" (Danny Byrd Remix) — 6:06
- UK Maxi CD
1. "Everybody" (Radio Edit) — 2:50
2. "Everybody" (Club Mix) — 5:59
3. "Everybody" (Don Diablo Remix) — 6:03
4. "Everybody" (Morjac Remix) — 6:27
5. "Everybody" (Darbuck & Klein Remix) — 7:10
6. "Everybody" (Agent X Remix) — 4:21
7. "Everybody" (Danny Byrd Remix) — 6:06

=== Official mixes ===
1. "Everybody" (Radio Edit) — 02:50
2. "Everybody" (Extended/Club Mix) — 05:59
3. "Everybody" (Morjac Mix) — 06:27
4. "Everybody" (Darbuck & Klein Remix) — 07:10
5. "Everybody" (Nino Anthony's Confessions Mix) — 07:15
6. "Everybody" (Don Diablo Remix) — 06:03
7. "Everybody" (Disko Loko Mix) — 08:02
8. "Everybody" (123xyz Mix) — 07:35
9. "Everybody" (Agent X Remix) — 04:21
10. "Everybody" (Danny Byrd Remix) — 6:06

== Charts ==
=== Weekly charts ===
Chart (2009)	Peak position
Australia Physical Singles (ARIA)	40
CIS Airplay (TopHit)	24
Russia Airplay (TopHit)	27
Scotland (OCC)	18
UK Dance (OCC)	5
UK Singles (OCC)	24

=== Year-end charts ===
Chart (2009)	Position
CIS (Tophit)	142
Russia Airplay (TopHit)	152
