= Watch the Sun Come Up =

Single by Example

from the album Won't Go Quietly
- Released: 21 September 2009
- Recorded: 2009
- Genre: Hip house; eurohouse
- Length: 4:22 (album version); 3:25 (radio edit)
- Label: Data
- Songwriters: Elliot Gleave; Alex Smith
- Producer: The Fearless

Example singles chronology
"Hooligans" (2009)	"Watch the Sun Come Up" (2009)	"Won't Go Quietly" (2010)

"Watch the Sun Come Up" is a song by British recording artist Example. It is the first single from Example's second album Won't Go Quietly and was released on 20 September 2009. Some of the lyrics from Watch the Sun Come Up were taken from Example's unreleased song, "One Night" from his 2006 mixtape We Didn't Invent the Remix. The song features additional uncredited vocals from David Stewart.

== Music video ==
The music video was filmed in both London and Ibiza by director Henry Schofield, who had previously worked on Example's other videos and later filmed Professor Green's videos. The video premiered on "datarecordsuk" channel on 21 August 2009 and has clocked up nearly 9 million views. The video shows Example reminiscing about him and a girl he met on holiday; the shots filmed in Ibiza were them on holiday and those in London were him in on his own. Henry Schofield says that he used a visual hook so the scenery in the background morphs, so "...one moment he's in London and in the same shot, it morphs and he's back where he was. It's the same kind of way you would naturally remember something..."

== Track listing ==
Digital download
No.	Title	Length
1.	"Watch the Sun Come Up" (Radio Edit)	3:24
2.	"Watch the Sun Come Up" (Live Studio Version)	4:26
3.	"Watch the Sun Come Up" (Extended Mix)	5:27
4.	"Watch the Sun Come Up" (Fred Falke Remix)	8:12
5.	"Watch the Sun Come Up" (Blame Remix)	6:11
6.	"Watch the Sun Come Up" (Devil's Gun 'Zeitgeist' Remix)	6:07
7.	"Watch the Sun Come Up" (Moám Remix)	7:17
Total length:		41:00

== Chart performance ==
Chart (2009–2010)	Peak position
Scotland Singles (OCC)	27
Slovakia Airplay (ČNS IFPI)	74
UK Dance (OCC)	3
UK Indie (OCC)	3
UK Singles (OCC)	19

== Certifications ==
Certifications for Watch The Sun Come Up
Region	Certification	Certified units/sales
United Kingdom (BPI)	Silver	200,000^{‡}
^{‡} Sales+streaming figures based on certification alone.
