= Give It Away =

Give It Away may refer to:

== Albums ==
- Give It Away (The Chi-Lites album) (1969)
- Give It Away (Gaither Vocal Band album) (2006)
- Give It Away (Paul Brandt album) (2011)

== Songs ==
- "Give It Away" (Deepest Blue song) (2004)
- "Give It Away" (George Strait song) (2006)
- "Give It Away" (Red Hot Chili Peppers song) (1991)
- "Give It Away", by The Fray on the album Helios
- "Give It Away", by James on the album Pleased to Meet You
- "Give It Away", by Zero 7 on the album Simple Things (2001)

== See also ==
- Give It Up (disambiguation)
- Give It All Away (disambiguation)
- Give Yourself Away, Robbie Seay Band album (2007)
- "Givin' Yourself Away", Ratt song (1990)
