= Kickstarts (song) =

2010 single by Example

Single by Example

from the album Won't Go Quietly
- Released: 13 June 2010
- Recorded: 2009
- Genre: Electro house; dance-pop
- Length: 3:01
- Label: Data
- Songwriter: Elliot Gleave
- Producers: Sub Focus, Calvin Harris

Example singles chronology
"Won't Go Quietly" (2010)	"Kickstarts" (2010)	"Last Ones Standing" (2010)

"Kickstarts" is a song by British singer Example. This is the third single from Example's second album, Won't Go Quietly. The song was available to download on 13 June 2010, with a physical single release on 14 June 2010. Production was handled by British drum and bass musician Sub Focus and Scottish dance music DJ Calvin Harris.

== Critical reception ==
Robert Copsey of Digital Spy gave the song a positive review stating:

Having scored that all-important breakthrough hit with 'Won't Go Quietly' earlier this year, Elliot 'Example' Gleave now faces the tricky task of following it up. The Londoner recently told us he was gunning for plenty of radio play and a well-received video with this one – but does 'Kickstarts' warrant that kind of attention?

The answer is a resounding "Yes!" Example reckons producer Sub Focus has brought a "hardcore club edge to a lyrically poppy single" here – and he's not wrong, with lines like "You're my girl in a golden crown / Princess I don't wanna let you down" cloaked in loads of clubby beats and a squiggly synth riff. It all adds up to a self-proclaimed slice of "grown-up rave" that's as refreshing as sipping a pint of cider in a pub garden on a hot summer's day. Nice.

== Track listing ==
Digital download
No.	Title	Length
1.	"Kickstarts" (radio edit)	3:01
2.	"Kickstarts" (extended mix)	5:31
3.	"Kickstarts" (Wideboys stadium mix)	6:32
4.	"Kickstarts" (Afrojack remix)	6:31
5.	"Kickstarts" (Fenech-Soler remix)	5:45

== Chart performance ==
"Kickstarts" debuted on the Irish Singles Chart at number 8 on 18 June 2010, marking Example's most successful single in the country, after "Won't Go Quietly" reached a peak of number 6 in January 2010. Likewise, "Kickstarts" received similar success on the UK Singles Chart, debuting at number 3 beating the previous single's peak of number 6, but also at number one on the UK Dance Chart and UK Indie Chart, marking his second consecutive number one on both charts. The single also managed to reach a peak of number 11 on the European Hot 100 Singles chart.

== Charts ==
=== Weekly charts ===
Chart (2010–2012)	Peak position
Austria (Ö3 Austria Top 40)	35
Belgium (Ultratip Bubbling Under Flanders)	4
Belgium (Ultratip Bubbling Under Wallonia)	34
Czech Republic Airplay (ČNS IFPI)	9
Europe (European Hot 100 Singles)	11
Germany (GfK)	72
Hungary (Rádiós Top 40)	23
Ireland (IRMA)	8
New Zealand (Recorded Music NZ)	12
Scotland Singles (OCC)	2
Slovakia Airplay (ČNS IFPI)	12
UK Singles (OCC)	3
UK Dance (OCC)	1
UK Indie (OCC)	1
US Dance Club Songs (Billboard)	23

=== Year-end charts ===
Chart (2010)	Position
UK Singles (OCC)	44
Chart (2011)	Position
UK Singles (OCC)	198

== Certifications ==
Region	Certification	Certified units/sales
New Zealand (RMNZ)	Gold	7,500^{*}
United Kingdom (BPI)	2× Platinum	1,200,000^{‡}
^{*} Sales figures based on certification alone.^{‡} Sales+streaming figures based on certification alone.

== See also ==
- List of number-one dance hits of 2010 (UK)
- List of number-one indie hits of 2010 (UK)

== Release history ==
Region	Date	Format
Ireland	13 June 2010	Digital download
United Kingdom	13 June 2010	Digital download
