= Two Lives (song) =

Single by Example

from the album Won't Go Quietly
- Released: 14 November 2010
- Recorded: 2009
- Genre: Electropop
- Length: 3:28
- Label: Ministry of Sound
- Songwriters: Elliot Gleave; Pontus Hjelm; Amir Izadkhah; Eshraque Mughal
- Producers: iSHi; Amir Amor

Example singles chronology
"Monster" (2010)	"Two Lives" (2010)	"Game Over" (2010)

"Two Lives" is a song by British recording artist Example. It is the fifth single from Example's second album, Won't Go Quietly. The song was released on 14 November 2010.

The song failed to chart in the UK top 40, reaching only position 84. However, it achieved 6 in the UK Indie Chart and 10 on the UK Dance Chart.

== Music video ==
A music video to accompany the release of "Two Lives" was first released on YouTube on 14 October 2010 at three minutes and thirty-three seconds.

== Track listing ==
Digital download
No.	Title	Length
1.	"Two Lives"	3:27
2.	"Two Lives" (Extended Mix)	5:15
3.	"Two Lives" (Iain Archer Edit)	3:24
4.	"Two Lives" (Kris Menace Remix)	6:27
5.	"Two Lives" (Wez Clarke Remix)	6:58
6.	"Two Lives" (Loadstar Remix)	4:16
7.	"Two Lives" (Tek-One Flu Riddim Remix)	4:47

== Chart performance ==
Chart 2010	Peak position
UK Dance (OCC)	10
UK Indie (OCC)	6
UK Singles (OCC)	84

== Release history ==
Region	Date	Label	Format
United Kingdom	14 November 2010	Ministry of Sound	Digital Download
