= Arizona (American band) =

American pop rock band

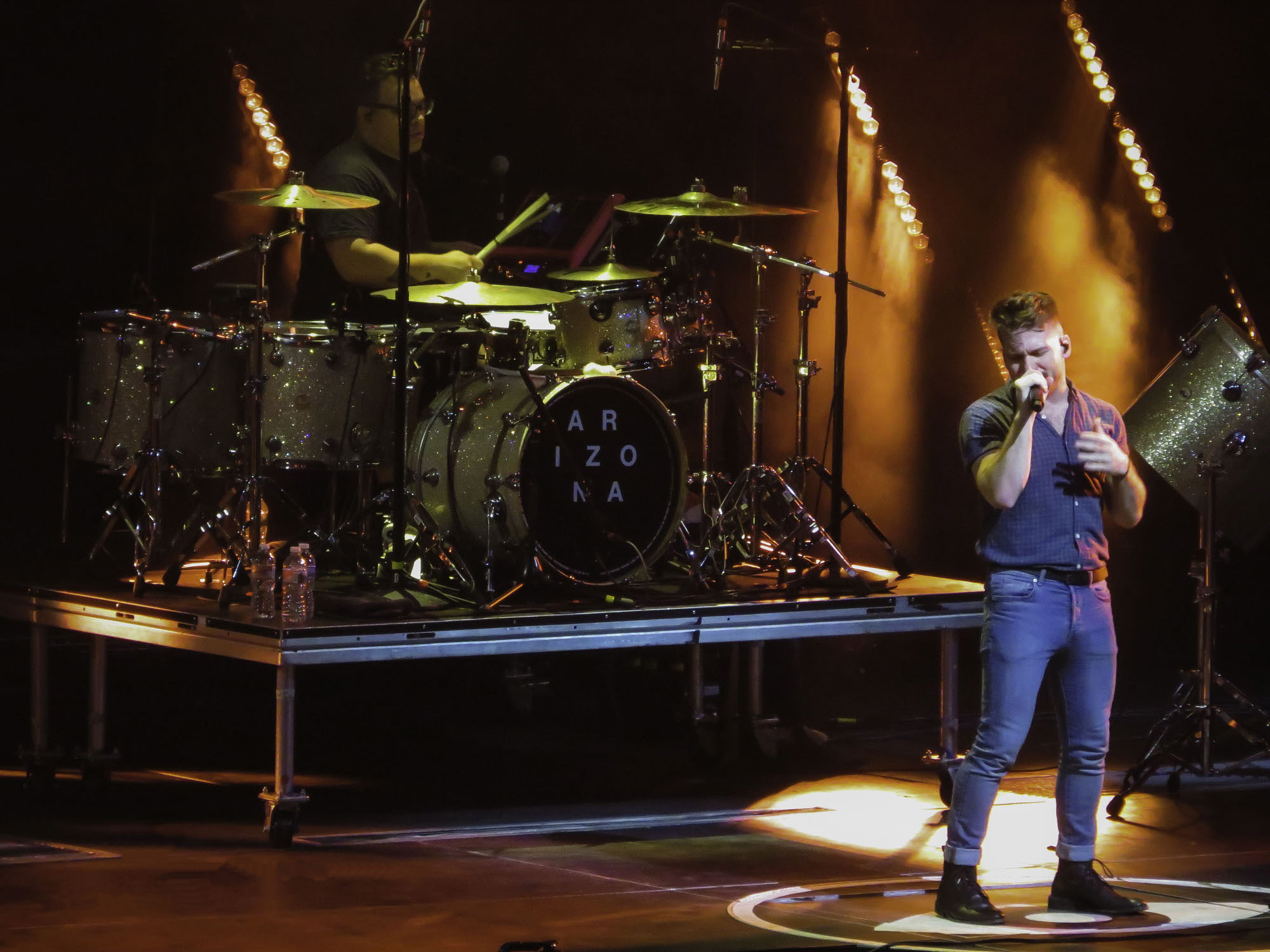
- Arizona performing in Denver, CO in 2018

Background information
- Origin: New Jersey
- Genres: Pop rock; electropop; indie pop; pop
- Years active: 2015–2025
- Label: Atlantic
- Past members: Zachary Charles; Nathan Esquite; David Labuguen
- Website: thisisarizonamusic.com

Arizona (stylized as A R I Z O N A) was an American pop rock and electropop band from New Jersey (despite its name) originally signed to Atlantic Records. The band's debut studio album Gallery was released on May 19, 2017, peaking at No. 4 on Top Heatseekers, No. 24 on U.S. Alternative, and No. 143 on the Billboard 200.

== History ==
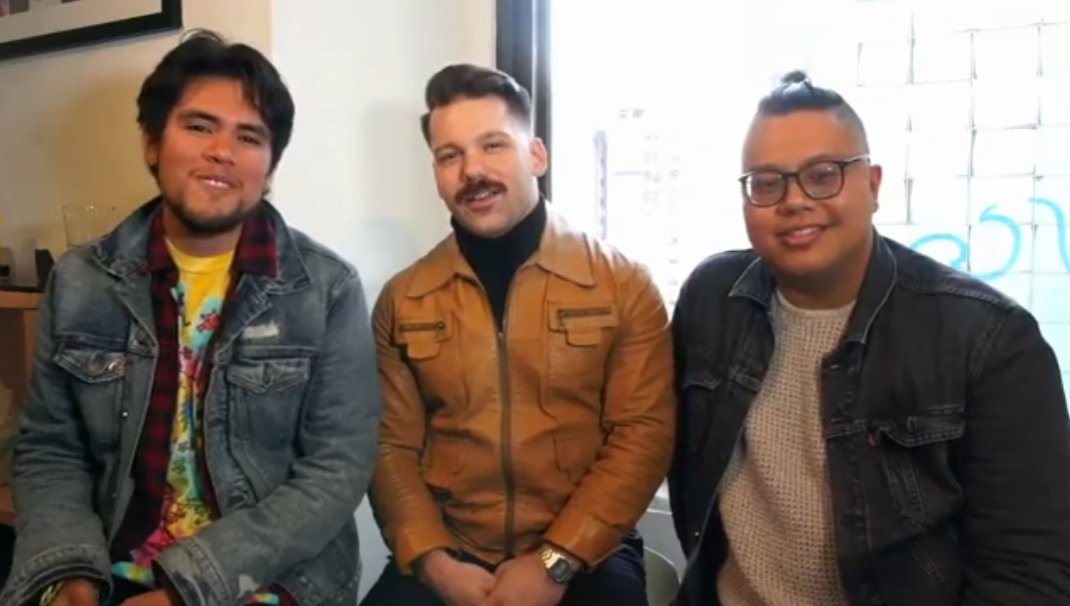
Esquite, Charles, and Labuguen in a 2019 interview

Band members Zachary Charles, Nathan Esquite, and David Labuguen began creating together as a group of friends in Boston while attending Berklee College of Music and Emerson College. During college, the three of them began working as songwriters and producers, before moving to Los Angeles, England, and finally back to their home state of New Jersey.

Arizona was signed to Atlantic Records in 2016. The band released several singles that year, including "I Was Wrong", "Oceans Away", and "Cross My Mind". Robin Schulz produced the official remix of "I Was Wrong", and, by August 2016, the original song had accrued 16 million streams online. The Robin Schulz remix also appeared on Billboard's Hot Dance/Electronic Songs chart for 9 weeks.

In 2017, the band toured with and opened for Kevin Garrett and, later, Coin. In March of that year, their single, "Oceans Away" had garnered 35.8 million streams on Spotify. On May 19, 2017, the band released its debut studio album, Gallery, on Atlantic Records. The album peaked at No. 143 on the Billboard 200 chart. Arizona has also played several festivals including South by Southwest, the Governors Ball Music Festival, Firefly Music Festival, and Lollapalooza. The band went on a North American headlining tour in the Fall of 2017. Also in 2017, Don Diablo (a Dutch DJ who is No. 11 in the world according to DJ Mag) produced the song, "Take Her Place" with Arizona. The song appeared on Diablo's album, Future.

In July 2018, the band released two new songs, "Summer Days" and "Freaking Out". They also started an arena tour that month, opening for Panic! at the Disco.

The band's sophomore album, Asylum, was released on October 11, 2019 and peaked at No.17 on Billboard's Heatseekers Album Chart.

After four years of hiatus, the band released its self-titled third album in May 2023. Shortly after, the band toured with and opened for Quinn XCII. Beginning in June of 2024, the band toured with and opened for Yellowcard and Third Eye Blind on the Summer Gods 2024 Tour.

On October 4, 2024, the band announced it would be on hiatus indefinitely following a farewell tour.

== Discography ==
=== Studio albums ===
List of studio albums, with selected chart positions
Title	Album details	Peak chart positions		
Title	Album details	US	US Heat	US Alt
Gallery	Released: May 19, 2017; Label: Atlantic; Format: CD, digital download	143	4	24
Asylum	Released: October 11, 2019; Label: Atlantic; Format: CD, digital download, streaming	—	17	—
A R I Z O N A	Released: May 12, 2023; Label: Elektra Records LLC; Format: digital download, streaming	TBA		
"—" denotes an album that did not chart or was not released in that territory.

=== Live albums ===
List of live albums, with selected chart positions
Title	Album details
U.S. of A.Z.	Release: December 13, 2017; Label: Self-released; Format: Digital download

=== Singles ===
List of singles, with selected chart positions, showing year released and album name
Title	Year	Peak chart positions				Album
Title	Year	US	US Rock	US Dance	SWE Heat	Album
"I Was Wrong"	2016	—	50	35	6	Gallery
"Let Me Touch Your Fire"	2016	—	—	—	—	Non-album singles
"People Crying Every Night"	2016	—	—	—	—	Non-album singles
"Where I Wanna Be"	2016	—	—	—	—	Non-album singles
"I Was Wrong (Acoustic)"	2016	—	—	—	—	Non-album singles
"Oceans Away"	2016	—	—	—	—	Gallery
"Electric Touch"	2017	—	—	—	—	Gallery
"Cross My Mind"	2017	—	39	—	—	Gallery
"Nostalgic"	2019	—	34	—	—	Asylum
"Moving On"	2023	—	—	—	—	A R I Z O N A
"Dark Skies"	2023	—	—	—	—	A R I Z O N A
"Die For A Night"	2023	—	—	—	—	A R I Z O N A
"—" denotes a recording that did not chart.

=== Other releases ===
- 2017: "Passionfruit" [Recorded at Spotify Studios NYC]
- 2017: "Cross My Mind Pt. 2" (featuring Kiiara)
- 2018: "Take Her Place" (Don Diablo featuring Arizona)
- 2018: "What She Wants"
- 2018: "Summer Days"
- 2019: "Hold The Line" (Avicii featuring Arizona)
- 2020: "Feel Alive (R3HAB featuring Arizona) [From SCOOB! The Album]
- 2021: "So What" (with Louis the Child)
- 2022: "Heart So Big" (with Matoma)
- 2023: "Hanging On"
- 2023: “Sorry Now”
