= Give It All Away =

Give It All Away may refer to:

- Give It All Away (Ben Jelen album), 2004
- Give It All Away (Theo Tams album), 2009

== See also ==
- "Gave It All Away", a 2010 song by Irish band Boyzone
- "Giving It All Away", a 1973 song by Roger Daltrey
- Give It Away (disambiguation)
- Give It All (disambiguation)
