= Life Is a Festival =

Studio album by Don Diablo
- Released: 2008 (CD); 3 December 2010 (digital download)
- Recorded: 2006–08
- Genres: Electronic; dance; hip hop
- Length: 1:00:13
- Labels: Sellout Sessions; Sony BMG
- Producer: Don Diablo

Don Diablo chronology
2 Faced (2004)	Life Is a Festival (00000003)	Future (2018)

Singles from Life Is a Festival
- 1. "I Need to Know" Released: 2006; 2. "Who's Your Daddy" Released: 2006; 3. "Stand Up" Released: 2007; 4. "Pain Is Temporary, Pride Is Forever" Released: 2007; 5. "This Way (Too Many Times)" Released: 2007; 6. "Music Is My Life" / "Hooligans Never Surrender" Released: 2008; 7. "Life Is a Festival" Released: 2008; 8. "Never Too Late" Released: 2009; 9. "I Am Not from France" Released: 2009

Life Is a Festival is a 2008 album by Dutch electronic musician Don Diablo. The genre of the album ranges from house music to hip hop. The album includes multiple various past single releases and even created new ones.

The album was originally intended to be called Respect Doesn't Pay the Bills, which was written in most of the physical single releases before 2008. Instead, the working title became the main title of the album's eighth track.

== Track listing ==
No.	Title	Length
1.	"The Best Is Yet to Come (Intro)"	2:13
2.	"Who's Your Daddy"	3:30
3.	"I Need to Know" (featuring Shystie)	3:12
4.	"This Way (Too Many Times)" (featuring Bizzey)	3:51
5.	"I Am Not from France"	3:35
6.	"Stand Up"	3:36
7.	"Get on the Floor (Are You Free Tonight)" (featuring J-Rock and Big Ed)	3:44
8.	"Respect Doesn't Pay the Bills (Livin' It Up)" (featuring Rhymefest)	3:42
9.	"Never Back Down"	4:32
10.	"Life Is a Festival"	3:58
11.	"Music Is My Life" (featuring Bizzey)	3:22
12.	"Bright City Lights"	3:37
13.	"Never Too Late"	4:18
14.	"Pain Is Temporary, Pride Is Forever"	3:42
15.	"Home Sweet Home (1995)"	5:29
16.	"Hooligans Never Surrender" (hidden track)	3:52
Total length:		60:13

== Charts ==
Chart (2008)	Peak position
Dutch Albums (Album Top 100)	37
