= Rudenko =

Rudenko (Ukrainian: Руденко, Russian: Руденко) is a Ukrainian surname, derived from the adjective Ukrainian: рудий, which means 'red'. Notable people with the surname include:

- Aleksandr Rudenko (footballer, born 1993), Russian goalkeeper
- Aleksandr Rudenko (footballer, born 1999), Russian forward
- Andriy Rudenko (born 1983), Ukrainian professional boxer
- Antonina Rudenko (born 1950), Soviet swimmer
- Bela Rudenko (1933–2021), Ukrainian and Russian opera singer
- Bogdan Rudenko (born 1977), Kazakhstani-Russian ice hockey player
- Konstantin Rudenko (born 1981), Kazakhstani-Russian ice hockey player
- Leonid Rudenko (born 1985), Russian record producer and DJ, also known simply as Rudenko
- Lyudmila Rudenko (1904–1986), Soviet chess player
- Mykola Rudenko (1920–2004), Ukrainian poet, writer and philosopher
- Roman Rudenko (1907–1981), Soviet lawyer
- Sergei Rudenko (1885–1969), Soviet anthropologist and archaeologist
- Sergei Rudenko (general) (1904–1990), Soviet Marshal of Aviation
- Stanislav Rudenko (born 1962), Russian football coach
- Vadim Rudenko (born 1967), Russian pianist
- Vitaliy Rudenko (born 1981), Ukrainian footballer
- Vladislav Rudenko (born 1996), Russian footballer
- Yana Rudenko (born 1999), Ukrainian activist
- Yekaterina Rudenko (born 1994), Kazakhstani swimmer
