= Take Her Place =

2017 song by Don Diablo

Single by Don Diablo featuring Arizona

from the album Future
- Released: 27 October 2017
- Genre: Future house; indie pop
- Length: 3:29
- Label: Parametric Record
- Songwriter(s): David Labuguen; Don Pepijn Schipper; Nathaniel Esquite; Scott Harris; Zachary Charles
- Producer(s): Don Diablo

Don Diablo singles chronology
"Don't Let Go" (2017)	"Take Her Place" (2017)	"You Can't Change Me" (2017)

Arizona singles chronology
"Passionfruit" (2017)	"Take Her Place" (2017)	"What She Wants" (2018)

Music video
- "Take Her Place" on YouTube

"Take Her Place" is a single by Dutch DJ Don Diablo featuring American band Arizona. It was released on 27 October 2017 from his second studio album Future.

== Music video ==
The music video was uploaded on 23 November 2017, In the music video, Diablo's pet husky accompanies him throughout his daily routine–which in this case, includes a midnight drive in a vintage DeLorean–with an emotional twist. The aesthetic of the video pays homage to the 80s, with an almost vaporwave presentation.

== Charts ==
=== Weekly charts ===
Chart (2017–18)	Peak position
Belgium (Ultratip Bubbling Under Wallonia)	2
Belgium Dance (Ultratop Wallonia)	5
US Hot Dance/Electronic Songs (Billboard)	23

=== Year-end charts ===
Chart (2018)	Position
US Hot Dance/Electronic Songs (Billboard)	79
