= Hooligans (song) =

Single by Don Diablo and Example

from the album Won't Go Quietly
- Released: 28 June 2009
- Recorded: 2009
- Genre: Drum and bass
- Length: 3:11 (radio edit); 5:59 (extended mix); 3:37 (VIP mix / album version)
- Label: Data; OneLove
- Songwriters: Don Pepijn Schipper; Elliot Gleave
- Producer: Don Diablo

Don Diablo singles chronology
"Disco Disco Disco" (2009)	"Hooligans" (2009)	"Never Too Late" (2009)

Example singles chronology
"Me & Mandy" (2008)	"Hooligans" (2009)	"Watch the Sun Come Up" (2009)

Music video
- "Hooligans" on YouTube

"Hooligans" is a song by Dutch producer Don Diablo and British musician Example. The single was released on 28 June 2009 through Data Records. The song was written by Don Diablo, who also produced it, and Example. It includes remixes by Noisia, A1 Bassline, Spor, Doorly and Don himself. It is the vocal version of Diablo's 2008 instrumental track "Hooligans Never Surrender", a single from (and the hidden bonus track of) his album Life Is a Festival. "Hooligans" marks one of Example's first moves away from the underground rap scene toward a more mainstream audience as it was his first major label release. Gleave signed to Data Records after the folding of The Streets' label The Beats. Although an independent single release, a VIP mix of the song, featuring additional production from DJ Wire's remix, was included in Example's second studio album, Won't Go Quietly.

== Music video ==
A music video was publishing to YouTube on 6 May 2009 through the Data Records UK channel. The video itself, lasting a duration of four minutes and twenty-two seconds, starts off with an impatient man trying to get into a rave party. After getting in, Don and Example are seen performing in front of a crowd of people. In the meanwhile, the man is no longer seen throughout the video. Diablo and Example are often performing while crowd surfing. The video was deemed explicit due to its multiple references of rave party mentality with sex, drugs and alcohol.

== Track listing ==
Digital download
No.	Title	Length
1.	"Hooligans" (radio edit)	3:11
2.	"Hooligans" (extended mix)	5:59
3.	"Hooligans" (Don Diablo's Drive by Disco remix)	6:31
4.	"Hooligans" (Doorly's Dubstep remix)	4:29
5.	"Hooligans" (Spor remix)	6:08
6.	"Hooligans" (A1 Bassline remix)	5:56
7.	"Hooligans" (Noisia remix)	5:56

Digital download – remix EP
No.	Title	Length
1.	"Hooligans" (Ryan Riback's Woop Woop remix)	6:07
2.	"Hooligans" (Kid Kenobi remix)	6:25
3.	"Hooligans" (Wongo & Danny T remix)	5:06

Hooligans (Wire remix) – single
No.	Title	Length
1.	"Hooligans" (Wire remix)	5:14

CD single
No.	Title	Length
1.	"Hooligans" (radio edit)	3:11
2.	"Hooligans" (extended mix)	5:59
3.	"Hooligans" (Don Diablo's Drive by Disco remix)	6:31
4.	"Hooligans" (Spor remix)	6:08
5.	"Hooligans" (A1 Bassline remix)	5:56
6.	"Hooligans" (Doorly's Dubstep remix)	4:29
7.	"Hooligans" (Dub mix)	6:07
8.	"Hooligans" (Club F**kers remix)	4:58

== Chart performance ==
Despite the song's popularity, it has not made any major chart performances. However, it reached number 15 on the UK Dance Chart.

=== Weekly charts ===
Chart (2009)	Peak position
UK Dance (OCC)	15

== Release history ==
Region	Date	Label	Format
Worldwide	28 June 2009	Data	CD; digital download
Worldwide	6 March 2010	OneLove	CD; digital download
