= Leonid Rudenko =

Russian DJ (born 1985)

Rudenko
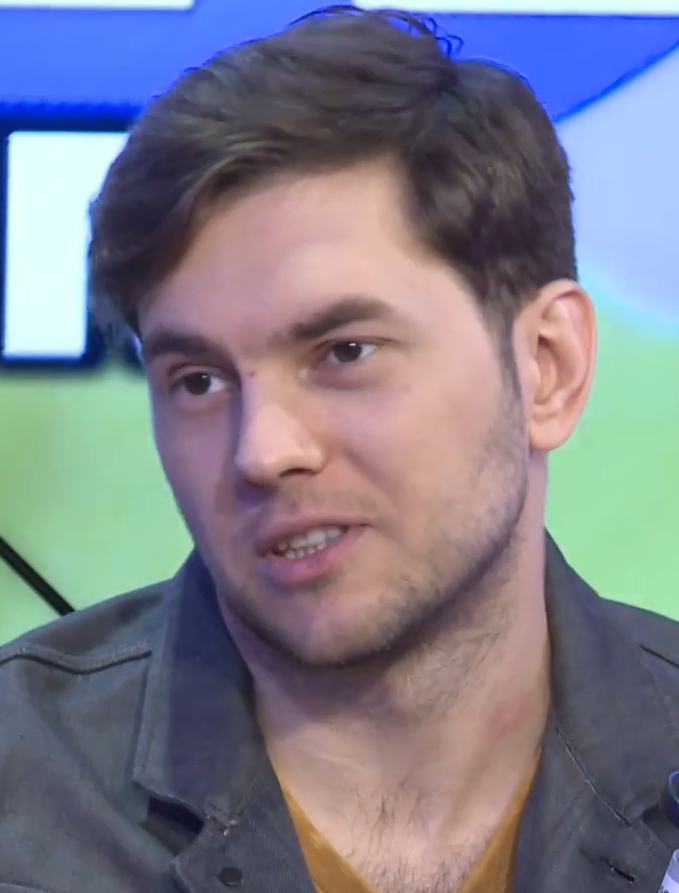
- Leonid Rudenko in April 2018

Background information
- Born: Leonid Anatolyevich Rudenko; 16 July 1985 (age 40); Moscow, Soviet Union
- Origin: Moscow, Russia
- Genres: Dance, house, trance
- Occupations: DJ, producer
- Instrument: Vocals
- Years active: 2008–present
- Label: Data Records (UK)
- Website: leonidrudenko.com

Leonid Rudenko (Russian: Леонид Руденко, born in 1985), better known by his stage name, Rudenko, is a record producer and DJ from Russia, who was born and raised in Moscow.

== Music career ==
Rudenko started producing when he was 10 years old and spent all of his spare time experimenting with new sounds. "Destination", released in 2008, was Rudenko's first major single in Russia. But his second single, "Everybody", was his greatest international success. It was released in the UK in February, 2009 and peaked on the UK Singles Chart at number 24.

Rudenko composed the music that was played during the opening of the 2014 Winter Olympics in Sochi, when the athletes entered the stadium. The music from the ceremony was released as a digital album called Parade of Nations on February 28, 2014 due to massive fan demand from around the world.

== Discography ==
=== Singles ===
- "Destination" (2008)
- "Everybody" (2009)
- "Real Life" (2009)
- "Love Story" (2010)
- "Goodbye" (2010)
- "Stranger" (2011)
- "Восточный экспресс" (Romanized: Vostochniy express) featuring Mitya Fomin (2012)
