= Morjac =

- Also known as: The Montanas, Natural High, Risskov Bandits, Teamsters, Marly, Natural High, Act of Dog
- Genres: Dance, house, electronic
- Years active: c.1995–present
- Labels: Montana Entertainment, Ultra, Macho Roostas
- Members: Jacob Johansen; Morten Lambertsen
- Website: montana-entertainment.com

Morjac are a Danish electronic duo, composed of producers Morten Lambertsen and Jacob Johansen. They met in 1990, as members of the band King Kane. Morjac are best known for their 2003 single "Stars", which featured Raz Conway on vocals and reached Number 38 on the UK Singles Chart. It was also playlisted on BBC Radio 1's C list.

== Discography ==
=== Singles ===
| Year | Title | Chart peak positions |
| Year | Title | UK |
|---|---|---|
| 2003 | "Stars" | 38 |
