= Future (Don Diablo album) =

Studio album by Don Diablo
- Released: 9 February 2018
- Recorded: 2017–18
- Genre: Electronic
- Label: Hexagon
- Producer: Don Diablo

Don Diablo chronology
Life Is a Festival (2008)	Future (2018)	Forever (2021)

Singles from Future
- 1. "Save a Little Love" Released: 9 June 2017; 2. "Momentum" Released: 21 July 2017; 3. "Don't Let Go" Released: 1 September 2017; 4. "Take Her Place" Released: 27 October 2017; 5. "You Can't Change Me" Released: 15 December 2017; 6. "People Say" Released: 19 January 2018; 7. "Believe" Released: 23 March 2018; 8. "Give Me Love" Released: 25 April 2018

Future is the third studio album by Dutch DJ Don Diablo. It was released on 9 February 2018 through his Hexagon label. Don had contributed his vocals to three of the sixteen songs on the album. Singers featured on the album include Ansel Elgort, Nina Nesbitt, Calum Scott, Betty Who, James Newman, Miles Graham, Holly Winter, Dave Thomas Junior, Paije and A R I Z O N A.

== Background ==
Don revealed the title and release date of his first album since 2008's Life Is a Festival on his Snapchat story. He would be going on a tour of the same name in North America to promote the album. Previously released singles such as "People Say", "You Can't Change Me", "Take Her Place" and "Don't Let Go" are expected to be part of the album.

Don spoke about the album, he said "The upcoming album is all about pushing things forward, sonically and musically, taking things into the FUTURE in the broadest sense of the word." The sixth single "People Say" was debuted at the 2017 Ultra Music Festival in Miami in Don's stage performance. He also described the album as showing "a different side" of himself as a producer and artist.

In a week before the release of the album, Don live-streamed some songs from the album on his Facebook page. The live-stream featured Don performing his set inside a space shuttle provided, as a courtesy, by the European Space Agency.

Don spoke about the album, stating "I wanted this to be a motivational record that sonically showcases new ideas on a production level, ranging from future house to future pop and everything in between."

"These last few years have been quite a journey for me on all levels. I had to fight many demons on a personal level and rediscovered myself as an artist in the process. I never thought I would end up where I am today, but on my journey I have learned and experienced many things that I have (subconsciously) used while working on this album." —Don Diablo

The album's cover art bears a parody of the Parental Advisory sticker in the bottom right, showing a "futuristic" content label in place of the "explicit" content warning.

== Commercial reception ==
Billboard described the album as a "beautiful 'good vibes' radiator, welcomes the summer." However, some of Don's fans described the lack of his unique future house sound as disappointing, and felt he was "straying away from his signature sound."

== Track listing ==
All tracks produced by Don Diablo.

No.	Title	Writer(s)	Length
1.	"Back to Us" (featuring Mike Waters)	Don Schipper; David Brook; Martijn van Sonderen; Michael Bywaters; Sebastian Teigen	3:00
2.	"Everybody's Somebody" (featuring BullySongs)	Schipper; van Sonderen; Ian Brown; Josh Record; Andrew Bullimore	3:18
3.	"Put It on for Me" (featuring Nina Nesbitt)	Schipper; van Sonderen; Nesbitt; Sam Preston; Timothy Deal	3:23
4.	"Give Me Love" (featuring Calum Scott)	Schipper; van Sonderen; Scott; Bullimore; Camille Purcell; Linus Nordström; Frank Nobel	3:28
5.	"Higher" (featuring Betty Who)	Schipper; van Sonderen; Jasmine Thompson; Lindy Robbins; Michael McGinnis; Nickolas Jack Scapa	3:00
6.	"Take Her Place" (featuring Arizona)	Schipper; David Labuguen; Nathaniel Esquite; Zachary Charles; Scott Harris	3:29
7.	"Head Up" (featuring James Newman)	Schipper; van Sonderen; Newman; Pablo Bowman; Richard Boardman	3:11
8.	"Bright Skies (The Bit U Know)" (featuring Miles Graham)	Schipper; van Sonderen; Graham	3:37
9.	"Found You" (featuring BullySongs)	Schipper; van Sonderen; Bullimore; Record; Josh Wilkinson; Thomas Troelsen	3:09
10.	"Reflections"	Schipper; van Sonderen	4:33
11.	"You Can't Change Me"	Armand van Helden; N'Dea Davenport; Roger Sanchez	3:07
12.	"Don't Let Go" (featuring Holly Winter)	Schipper; van Sonderen; Winter; Sebastian Wehlings; Tobias Kuhn	3:12
13.	"Killer" (featuring Dave Thomas Junior)	Adam Paul Tinley; Samuel Henry Olusegun Adeola	4:07
14.	"People Say" (featuring Paije)	Schipper; van Sonderen; Karen Poole; Paije Richardson	3:08
15.	"Satellites"	Schipper	3:30
16.	"Echoes"	Schipper	3:56

Physical album
No.	Title	Length
15.	"Gangsta Ways"	3:00
16.	"Satellites"	3:30
17.	"Echoes"	3:56

Deluxe edition
No.	Title	Writer(s)	Length
1.	"Believe" (featuring Ansel Elgort)	Schipper; Elgort	3:37
2.	"Back to Us" (featuring Mike Waters)		3:00
3.	"Everybody's Somebody" (featuring BullySongs)		3:18
4.	"Put It on for Me" (featuring Nina Nesbitt)		3:23
5.	"Give Me Love" (featuring Calum Scott)		3:28
6.	"Higher" (featuring Betty Who)		3:00
7.	"Head Up" (featuring James Newman)		3:11
8.	"Save a Little Love"		3:22
9.	"Bright Skies (The Bit U Know)" (featuring Miles Graham)		3:37
10.	"Found You" (featuring BullySongs)		3:09
11.	"Reflections"		4:33
12.	"You Can't Change Me"		3:07
13.	"Momentum"		2:49
14.	"Don't Let Go" (featuring Holly Winter)		3:12
15.	"Killer" (featuring Dave Thomas Junior)		4:07
16.	"People Say" (featuring Paije)		3:08
17.	"Satellites"		3:30
18.	"Echoes"		3:56

== Charts ==
Chart (2018)	Peak position
Belgian Albums (Ultratop Flanders)	107
Dutch Albums (Album Top 100)	92
New Zealand Heatseeker Albums (RMNZ)	7
US Top Dance/Electronic Albums (Billboard)	9
