= Make Me Feel Better (Alex Adair song) =

Single by Alex Adair
- Released: 1 March 2015
- Recorded: 2014
- Genre: Tropical house
- Length: 4:55
- Label: Spinnin'
- Songwriters: Alex Adair; Cédric Steinmyller; Edgar Catry; Jens Maywald; Nickolas Ashford; Valerie Simpson
- Producer: Alex Adair

Alex Adair singles chronology
"Make Me Feel Better" (2015)	"Heaven" (2015)

"Make Me Feel Better" is a song recorded by English record producer and DJ Alex Adair. It was released as a single on 1 March 2015 by Spinnin' Records. It samples vocals from "Ain't Nothing Like the Real Thing" by Marvin Gaye and Tammi Terrell.

== Music video ==
The music video for "Make Me Feel Better" premiered on 20 December 2014. The video was filmed in Los Angeles. It shows three young women dancing in front of a backdrop with settings in the backdrop changing as they continue to dance. As of October 2017, the video has received over 13 million views on YouTube.

== Track listings ==
- Digital download
1. "Make Me Feel Better" – 4:55
- Digital download (Radio Edit)
1. "Make Me Feel Better" (Radio Edit) – 3:17
- Remixes
1. "Make Me Feel Better" (Klingande Remix) – 4:25
2. "Make Me Feel Better" (Don Diablo & CID Remix) – 3:22
3. "Make Me Feel Better" (Illyus & Barrientos Remix) – 6:03
4. "Make Me Feel Better" (Russ Chimes Remix) – 6:59
5. "Make Me Feel Better" (S.P.Y Remix) – 5:18

== Charts ==
Chart (2015)	Peak position
Australia (ARIA)	51
Belgium (Ultratop 50 Flanders)	35
Belgium (Ultratip Bubbling Under Wallonia)	19
France (SNEP)	185
Hungary (Rádiós Top 40)	3
Ireland (IRMA)	66
Scotland Singles (Official Charts)	11
Sweden Heatseeker (Sverigetopplistan)	7
UK Dance (Official Charts)	2
UK Singles (Official Charts)	13

== Certifications ==
Region	Certification	Certified units/sales
Sweden (GLF)	Gold	20,000^{‡}
United Kingdom (BPI)	Gold	400,000^{‡}
^{‡} Sales+streaming figures based on certification alone.
