= Christian Gates =

- Born: 9 September 2002 (age 23); Yorba Linda, California, USA
- Genres: Alternative pop; dark pop; alt-R&B
- Occupations: Singer; songwriter
- Instruments: Vocals; piano
- Years active: 2019–present

Christian Gates (born September 9, 2002), known professionally by his stylized stage name Chri$tian Gate$, is an American singer, songwriter, and producer known for his alternative pop, alt-R&B, and dark pop music.

== Career ==
Gates was born in Yorba Linda, California. He began creating music around 2014, initially exploring multiple genres including rap, pop, R&B, and rock. He has released music under both the names Chri$tian Gate$ and ItsLuxCity, and has been involved in aspects of production and engineering of his recordings.

His debut album, No Strings Attached, released in 2024, was described by Hashtag Magazine as genre-blending and included singles such as TOXIC, featuring Dutch Melrose, Secrets, and NUMB. The album was followed by tracks such as Dangerous State of Mind. Earlier in his career, he released an EP titled Why Do I Hear Breathing?

Gates has headlined live performances at venues such as The Underworld in London.

Gates has stated that his sound is influenced by both contemporary pop and alternative R&B. He co-wrote the song Ride Or Die by Cai Xukun, which went on to be Top 1 on QQ Music in China and he was named Top 25 breakthrough artists by Rolling Stone.

== Discography ==
=== Studio albums ===
- No Strings Attached

=== Extended Plays (EP) ===
- Why Do I Hear Breathing

=== Selected Singles ===
- Dangerous State of Mind
- NUMB

=== Music Videos ===
- Secrets
- TOXIC
