= Won't Go Quietly =

Studio album by Example
- Released: 20 June 2010
- Genres: Dance-pop; hip-hop; electro house; dance; dubstep
- Length: 51:38
- Label: Data
- Producers: The Fearless; Don Diablo; Calvin Harris; MJ Cole; Bjorn Yttling; iSHi; Sub Focus; Chase & Status; Bart B More; Funkagenda; Wire

Example chronology
What We Almost Made (2008)	Won't Go Quietly (2010)	Playing in the Shadows (2011)

Singles from Won't Go Quietly
- 1. "Watch the Sun Come Up" Released: 20 September 2009; 2. "Won't Go Quietly" Released: 18 January 2010; 3. "Kickstarts" Released: 13 June 2010; 4. "Last Ones Standing" Released: 12 September 2010; 5. "Two Lives" Released: 14 November 2010

Won't Go Quietly is the second studio album from British recording artist Example. It was released as a digital download on 20 June 2010, with the physical release the following day. Noted producers that helped with the album include Calvin Harris, Sub Focus and Chase & Status. As of December 2012, the album has sold 265,000 copies in the UK.

== Critical reception ==
Professional ratings
Review scores
Source	Rating
Allmusic	4/5 stars
Digital Spy	4/5 stars
RapReviews	6/10 stars
The Guardian	3/5 stars
The Observer	mixed
BBC Music	positive

Won't Go Quietly received generally positive reviews up on its release. Robert Copsey of Digital Spy gave a positive review stating that "Won't Go Quietly is an entertaining and relentlessly catchy collection from an artist who could, on first glance, be accused of shamelessly following the latest chart trends". BBC music also gave the album a positive review stating that it's "perfect contemporary chart material".

== Singles ==
- The first single to be released from the album was "Watch the Sun Come Up" and was released on 20 September 2009. The single peaked at number 19 on the UK Singles Chart and number 3 on the UK Dance Chart.
- The second single to be released from the album was "Won't Go Quietly" and was released on 18 January 2010. The single peaked at number 6 on the UK Singles Chart and number 1 on the UK Dance Chart, as well as number 36 on the Irish Singles Chart.
- The third single to be released from the album was "Kickstarts" and was released on 13 June 2010. The single peaked at number 3 on the UK Singles Chart and number 1 on the UK Dance Chart as well as number 8 on the Irish Singles Chart, making it Example's most successful single at the time.
- The fourth single to be released from the album was "Last Ones Standing" and was released on 12 September 2010. The single peaked at number 27 on the UK Singles Chart and number 7 on the UK Dance Chart.
- The fifth and final single to be released from the album was "Two Lives" and was released on 14 November 2010. The single has peaked at number 10 on the UK Dance Chart and 84 on the UK Singles Chart.
- The original mix of "Hooligans" was released as a single on 28 June 2009. However, only the VIP mix of the song features on the album. The single failed to chart but was Gleave's first signing to Data Records.

== Track list ==
All lyrics are written by Elliot Gleave.

No.	Title	Producer(s)	Length
1.	"From Space"	The Fearless	3:09
2.	"Won't Go Quietly" (album version)	The Fearless	4:02
3.	"Watch the Sun Come Up" (album version)	The Fearless	4:22
4.	"Time Machine"	Calvin Harris	4:11
5.	"Something in the Water"	MJ Cole	3:53
6.	"Last Ones Standing"	Bjorn Yttling	3:24
7.	"Millionaires"	The Fearless	3:29
8.	"Two Lives"	iSHi	3:29
9.	"Kickstarts"	Sub Focus	3:01
10.	"Sick Note"	Chase & Status	4:07
11.	"Dirty Face"	Bart B More and Prince	2:47
12.	"Hooligans" (VIP Mix) (with Don Diablo)	Don Diablo	3:37
13.	"See the Sea"	Funkagenda	4:07
14.	"Won't Believe the Fools"	Sam Wire	4:52
Total length:			51:38

iTunes bonus track
No.	Title	Producer(s)	Length
15.	"Girl Can't Dance" (radio edit)	The Fearless	2:53
Total length:			54:45

iTunes deluxe edition bonus tracks
No.	Title	Producer(s)	Length
15.	"Girl Can't Dance" (radio edit)	The Fearless	2:53
16.	"From Space" (live)	The Fearless	3:21
17.	"Watch the Sun Come Up" (live)	The Fearless	4:19
18.	"Last Ones Standing" (live)	Bjorn Yttling	3:23
19.	"Won't Go Quietly" (live)	The Fearless	4:24
20.	"Kickstarts" (live)	Sub Focus	3:20
21.	"Hooligans" (with Don Diablo) (live)	Don Diablo	3:57
22.	"Watch the Sun Come Up" (radio edit)	The Fearless	3:23
23.	"Won't Go Quietly" (radio edit)	The Fearless	3:38
24.	"Kickstarts" (radio edit)	Sub Focus	3:01
25.	"Watch the Sun Come Up" (music video)		3:24
26.	"Won't Go Quietly" (music video)		3:49
27.	"Kickstarts" (music video)		3:00
28.	"Last Ones Standing" (music video)		3:26
29.	"Two Lives" (music video)		3:35

Opendisc bonus track
No.	Title	Producer(s)	Length
15.	"Girl Can't Dance" (Vandalism Mix)	The Fearless, Vandalism	5:38

HMV bonus disc
No.	Title	Producer(s)	Length
1.	"Loud" (with Don Diablo)	Don Diablo	4:06
2.	"Girl Can't Dance" (Chase & Status Remix)	The Fearless	3:37
3.	"Dirty Face" (Benga Remix)	Bart B More	4:48
4.	"Hooligans" (Wire Remix)	Don Diablo	5:15
5.	"Won't Go Quietly" (Wideboys Stadium Remix)	The Fearless	3:12
6.	"Watch the Sun Come Up" (Fred Falke Remix)	The Fearless	8:12

== Personnel ==
- Example – vocals
- The Fearless – producer, mixing
- Don Diablo – producer, mixing
- Calvin Harris – producer, mixing
- MJ Cole – producer, mixing
- Bjorn Yttling – producer
- Sub Focus – producer, mixing
- Chase & Status – producer, mixing
- iSHi – producer
- Bart B More – producer
- Funkagenda – producer
- Wire – producer
- Alex Smith – additional producer
- David Stewart – additional producer
- Wez Clarke – mixing, programming, additional production
- Phil Faversham – mixing, programming, additional production
- Alex Smith – additional vocals
- Pearse Macintyre – additional vocals
- Dr.Dolittles – additional vocals
- Bjorn Yttling – additional vocals
- Jamie Scott – additional vocals
- David Stewart – additional vocals
- Takura Tendayi – additional vocals
- MJ Cole – keyboards
- Funkagenda – keyboards
- Eddie Jenkins – additional keyboards
- Amir Izadkhah – bass
- Nakia Matthewson – artwork
- Will Jack – artwork
- Steven Eaves – photography
- Mark Surridge – additional photography
- Tom Chambers – additional photography
- Will Barnes – styling

== Chart performance ==
=== Weekly charts ===
Chart (2010)	Peak position
Irish Albums (IRMA)	26
Irish Independent Albums (IRMA)	1
Scottish Albums (Official Charts)	4
UK Albums (Official Charts)	4
UK Dance Albums (Official Charts)	1

=== Year-end charts ===
Chart (2010)	Position
UK Albums (OCC)	115
