= Dancin' (Aaron Smith song) =

- 12-inch vinyl label

Single by Aaron Smith featuring Luvli
- Released: 2004
- Length: 7:28 (original mix); 3:18 (Krono remix)
- Label: Moody Recordings
- Songwriters: Aaron Smith, Shalyn Walker
- Producer: Aaron Smith

"Dancin' " is a song by the American DJ Aaron Smith featuring American singer Luvli, released in 2004 through Moody Recordings. It reached the top 10 of the Billboard Hot Dance Airplay chart in March 2006. A remix by the French duo Krono was released in 2013, which was followed by a remix by the British producer Keeno, first premiered that same year.

In 2019, "Dancin'" was certified silver by the British Phonographic Industry (BPI), followed by Gold in 2021 and Platinum in 2022. In 2023, Sony Music and Ultra Records sued Moody Recordings over an "unauthorized version" of the song.

The music video from the Krono remix of "Dancin'" was filmed in Smáralind, Iceland and directed by Elvar Gunnarsson. As of July 2026, the video has over 225 million views on YouTube.

The Krono remix of "Dancin'" peaked at number 1 on Apple Music in Mexico on November 10, 2019. Additionally the Krono remix has accrued over a billion streams on the music streaming platform Spotify.

== Track listing ==
12-inch vinyl

- "Dancin'" (JJ Flores & Steve Smooth remix)
- "Dancin'" (original mix)

== Charts ==
Chart performance
Chart (2006–2015)	Peak position
France (SNEP)	140
Irish Singles Chart	29
Dutch Single Top 100	59
UK Singles Chart	20

== Certifications ==
Certifications and sales
Region	Certification	Certified units/sales
Canada (Music Canada)	Platinum	80,000^{‡}
Denmark (IFPI Danmark)	Gold	45,000^{‡}
Germany (BVMI)	Gold	150,000^{‡}
Italy (FIMI)	Platinum	70,000^{‡}
Mexico (AMPROFON)	Diamond+4× Platinum+Gold	570,000^{‡}
New Zealand (RMNZ)	3× Platinum	90,000^{‡}
Spain (Promusicae)	Platinum	60,000^{‡}
United Kingdom (BPI)	Platinum	600,000^{‡}
^{‡} Sales+streaming figures based on certification alone.
