= Won't Go Quietly (song) =

Single by Example

from the album Won't Go Quietly
- Released: 17 January 2010
- Recorded: 2009
- Genre: Eurohouse; electro
- Length: 4:02 (Album version); 3:38 (Radio edit)
- Label: Data
- Songwriters: Elliot Gleave; Alex Smith
- Producer: The Fearless

Example singles chronology
"Watch the Sun Come Up" (2009)	"Won't Go Quietly" (2010)	"Kickstarts" (2010)

"Won't Go Quietly" is a song by British recording artist Example. It is the second single from Example's second album of the same name, and was produced by The Fearless, composed of Alex Smith and Matt Furmidge. The song was available to download on 17 January 2010, with a physical single release on 18 January 2010. The song was used on 29 January 2010 by Channel 4 on Celebrity Big Brother 2010 as Stephanie Beacham's "Best Bits" song after her eviction and in France by W9 on the opening sequence of the French TV reality show Dilemme between 20 May and 15 July 2010.

== Critical reception ==
Digital Spy gave the following review along with a three-star rating:

- "Well, he's clearly gunning for that all-important breakthrough hit with 'Won't Go Quietly', which combines a memorable enough pop hook ("She's electric, she's the current running through my veins") with throbbing eurodance beats and a jagged bassline. Truth be told, it's hard to see where the "dysfunctional" element comes in and, if anything, this has a whiff of budget Calvin Harris to it. Still, if it's chart success Example is after, that could prove just the ticket."

BBC Chart Blog gave this review along with a four-star rating:

- "'Won't Go Quietly' is a very nowadays sort of a song, aimed at the same brainial pleasure receptors as almost everything Calvin Harris has released, with some smashing lyrics about not really wanting to get close to a lady, because she's probably going to turn out to be bad news, but going ahead and snuggling up anyway. It's not art, and it's not amazing but it'll do for now. Some songs are just here to help you pass the time in as enjoyable way as possible, until teacher gets back from the staff room."

== Chart performance ==
"Won't Go Quietly" was released on 18 January 2010, and after strong radio airplay received increasing amounts of digital downloads.

Following the increased sales, the single entered the UK Singles Chart on 24 January 2010, reaching a peak of number six. This makes "Won't Go Quietly" Example's first top-ten single. On 31 January 2010, "Won't Go Quietly" dropped three places to number nine, limiting his stay in the top ten for two weeks.

On 5 February 2010, the single entered the Irish Singles Chart for the first time, reaching number 36 for Example's first hit in Ireland.

== Music video ==
The music video for "Won't Go Quietly", directed by Ben Newman, features Example as a DJ rapping in front of a huge group of people dancing to the music, including British magician Dynamo.

== Track listing ==
Digital download – single
No.	Title	Length
1.	"Won't Go Quietly" (Radio Edit)	3:38
2.	"Won't Go Quietly" (Men in Masks Fiesta Remix)	3:54

Digital download – EP
No.	Title	Length
1.	"Won't Go Quietly" (Radio Edit)	3:38
2.	"Won't Go Quietly" (Extended Mix)	5:59
3.	"Won't Go Quietly" (DC Breaks vs. Vent Edit)	3:41
4.	"Won't Go Quietly" (Wideboys Stadium Remix)	6:38
5.	"Won't Go Quietly" (The Juan MacLean Remix)	8:39
6.	"Won't Go Quietly" (Wire Remix)	4:47
7.	"Won't Go Quietly" (Cyantific Remix)	5:01

CD single
No.	Title	Length
1.	"Won't Go Quietly" (Radio Edit)	3:38
2.	"Won't Go Quietly" (Wideboys Stadium Remix Edit)	3:12

CD single – remixes (DATA226CDSP)
No.	Title	Length
1.	"Won't Go Quietly" (Radio Edit)	3:41
2.	"Won't Go Quietly" (DC Breaks vs. Vent Edit)	3:54
3.	"Won't Go Quietly" (Wideboys Stadium Remix Edit)	3:14
4.	"Won't Go Quietly" (The Juan MacLean Edit)	4:06
5.	"Won't Go Quietly" (DC Breaks vs. Vent Remix)	5:40
6.	"Won't Go Quietly" (The Juan MacLean Remix)	8:41
7.	"Won't Go Quietly" (Cyantific Remix)	5:04
8.	"Won't Go Quietly" (E.P.I.C Radio Edit)	3:27
9.	"Won't Go Quietly" (Wire Remix)	4:48

Alternate UK CD single
No.	Title	Length
1.	"Won't Go Quietly" (Radio Edit)	3:41
2.	"Won't Go Quietly" (E.P.I.C Remix)	7:21
3.	"Won't Go Quietly" (The Juan MacLean Remix)	8:41
4.	"Won't Go Quietly" (Men in Masks Fiesta Remix)	3:56
5.	"Won't Go Quietly" (DC Breaks vs. Vent Remix)	5:38
6.	"Won't Go Quietly" (Cyantific Remix)	5:03
7.	"Won't Go Quietly" (Wire Remix)	4:49
8.	"Won't Go Quietly" (E.P.I.C Radio Edit)	3:25

Italian CD single (d:vision Records: DV 687.10 CDS)
No.	Title	Length
1.	"Won't Go Quietly" (Radio Edit)	3:40
2.	"Won't Go Quietly" (Wideboys Stadium Remix Edit)	3:14
3.	"Won't Go Quietly" (Extended Mix)	6:00
4.	"Won't Go Quietly" (E.P.I.C Remix)	7:19
5.	"Won't Go Quietly" (The Juan MacLean Remix)	8:41
6.	"Won't Go Quietly" (Wideboys Stadium Remix)	6:35
7.	"Won't Go Quietly" (TV Rock Remix)	7:31
8.	"Won't Go Quietly" (Cyantific Remix)	5:03
9.	"Won't Go Quietly" (Men in Masks Fiesta Remix)	3:54
10.	"Watch the Sun Come Up" (Blame Remix)	6:11
11.	"Won't Go Quietly" (music video)	3:49
12.	"Watch the Sun Come Up" (music video)	3:40

French CD single
No.	Title	Length
1.	"Won't Go Quietly" (Radio Edit)	3:41
2.	"Won't Go Quietly" (Wideboys Stadium Remix Edit)	3:12
3.	"Won't Go Quietly" (Extended Mix)	6:00
4.	"Won't Go Quietly" (TV Rock Remix)	7:31

United States digital download
No.	Title	Length
1.	"Won't Go Quietly" (Radio Edit)	3:38
2.	"Won't Go Quietly" (E.P.I.C Radio Edit)	3:24
3.	"Won't Go Quietly" (E.P.I.C Remix)	7:19
4.	"Won't Go Quietly" (TV Rock Remix)	7:30
5.	"Won't Go Quietly" (Wideboys Stadium Remix)	6:38

== Charts ==
=== Weekly charts ===
Chart (2010–2011)	Peak position
Belgium (Ultratip Bubbling Under Wallonia)	24
France (SNEP)	11
Ireland (IRMA)	36
New Zealand (Recorded Music NZ)	33
Scottish Singles Sales (Official Charts)	6
Slovakia Airplay (ČNS IFPI)	51
UK Dance (Official Charts)	1
UK Indie (Official Charts)	1
UK Singles (Official Charts)	6
US Dance Club Songs (Billboard)	8

=== Year-end charts ===
Chart (2010)	Position
France (SNEP)	97
UK Singles (OCC)	94

== Certifications ==
Region	Certification	Certified units/sales
United Kingdom (BPI)	Gold	400,000^{‡}
^{‡} Sales+streaming figures based on certification alone.
