= Alex Adair =

English record producer (born 1993)

- Born: 3 March 1993 (age 33)
- Origin: West Chiltington, West Sussex, England
- Genre: Tropical house
- Occupations: Disc jockey; Music producer
- Years active: 2014–present

Alex Adair (born 3 March 1993) is an English DJ, producer and remixer from West Chiltington.

He attended The College of Richard Collyer and Canterbury Christ Church University where he studied Creative Music Technology.

He is best known for his remix of Ed Sheeran's single "Thinking Out Loud" and the 2014 single "Make Me Feel Better", which entered at number 13 on the UK Singles Chart.

His most recent singles have been released on Glitterbox, Another Rhythm, Easier Said, Good Company, Virgin UK, Selected and Electronic Nature.

== Discography ==
Title	Year	Peak chart positions							Certifications	Album
Title	Year	UK	UK Dance	AUS	BEL	FRA	IRE	SCO	Certifications	Album
"Make Me Feel Better"	2015	13	2	51	35	185	66	11	BPI: Gold	Non-album singles
"Heaven"	2015	—	—	—	78	—	—	—		Non-album singles
"Burnin'" (with Steve Void)	2016	—	—	—	—	—	—	—		Non-album singles
"Casual"	2017	—	—	—	—	—	—	87		Non-album singles
"I Will" (featuring Eves Karydas)	2018	—	—	—	—	—	—	—		Non-album singles
"Dominos" (with Delayers, featuring Samantha Harvey)	2018	—	—	—	—	—	—	—		Non-album singles
"Stronger"	2019	—	—	—	—	—	—	—		Non-album singles
"Real for Me"	2020	—	—	—	—	—	—	—		Non-album singles
"That Thing" (with Mila Falls	2021	—	—	—	—	—	—	—		Non-album singles
"Problems"	2022	—	—	—	—	—	—	—		Non-album singles
"Looking For Love"	2022	—	—	—	—	—	—	—		Non-album singles
"Dreams"	2022	—	—	—	—	—	—	—		Non-album singles
"Get Close"	2022	—	—	—	—	—	—	—		Non-album singles
"Seeing's Believing"	2022	—	—	—	—	—	—	—		Non-album singles
"Loved Ones"	2023	—	—	—	—	—	—	—		Non-album singles
"Talk To Me" (with Jonas LR)	2023	—	—	—	—	—	—	—		Non-album singles
"Keep It Burning"	2023	—	—	—	—	—	—	—		Non-album singles
"Us Again"	2023	—	—	—	—	—	—	—		Non-album singles
"I'm So Glad"	2023	—	—	—	—	—	—	—		I'm So Glad EP
"Soul Speaks"	2023	—	—	—	—	—	—	—		I'm So Glad EP
"We'll Always Have Each Other"	2024	—	—	—	—	—	—	—		Non-album singles
"Love Is What We Hope For"	2024	—	—	—	—	—	—	—		Non-album singles
"Love Makes It Easy" (with Bottom Lip)	2024	—	—	—	—	—	—	—		Non-album singles
"Body Next To Mine" (with Bottom Lip)	2024	—	—	—	—	—	—	—		Non-album singles
"I Want You"	2024	—	—	—	—	—	—	—		Non-album singles
"Smiling Faces" (with Bottom Lip)	2024	—	—	—	—	—	—	—		Non-album singles
"Living on Love"	2024	—	—	—	—	—	—	—		Non-album singles
"Da Luna" (with Supafly and Bottom Lip)	2025	—	—	—	—	—	—	—		Non-album singles
"Life" (with Bottom Lip)	2025	—	—	—	—	—	—	—		Non-album singles
"Never What You Do"	2025	—	—	—	—	—	—	—		Non-album singles
