= Don Diablo =

Dutch musician (born 1980)

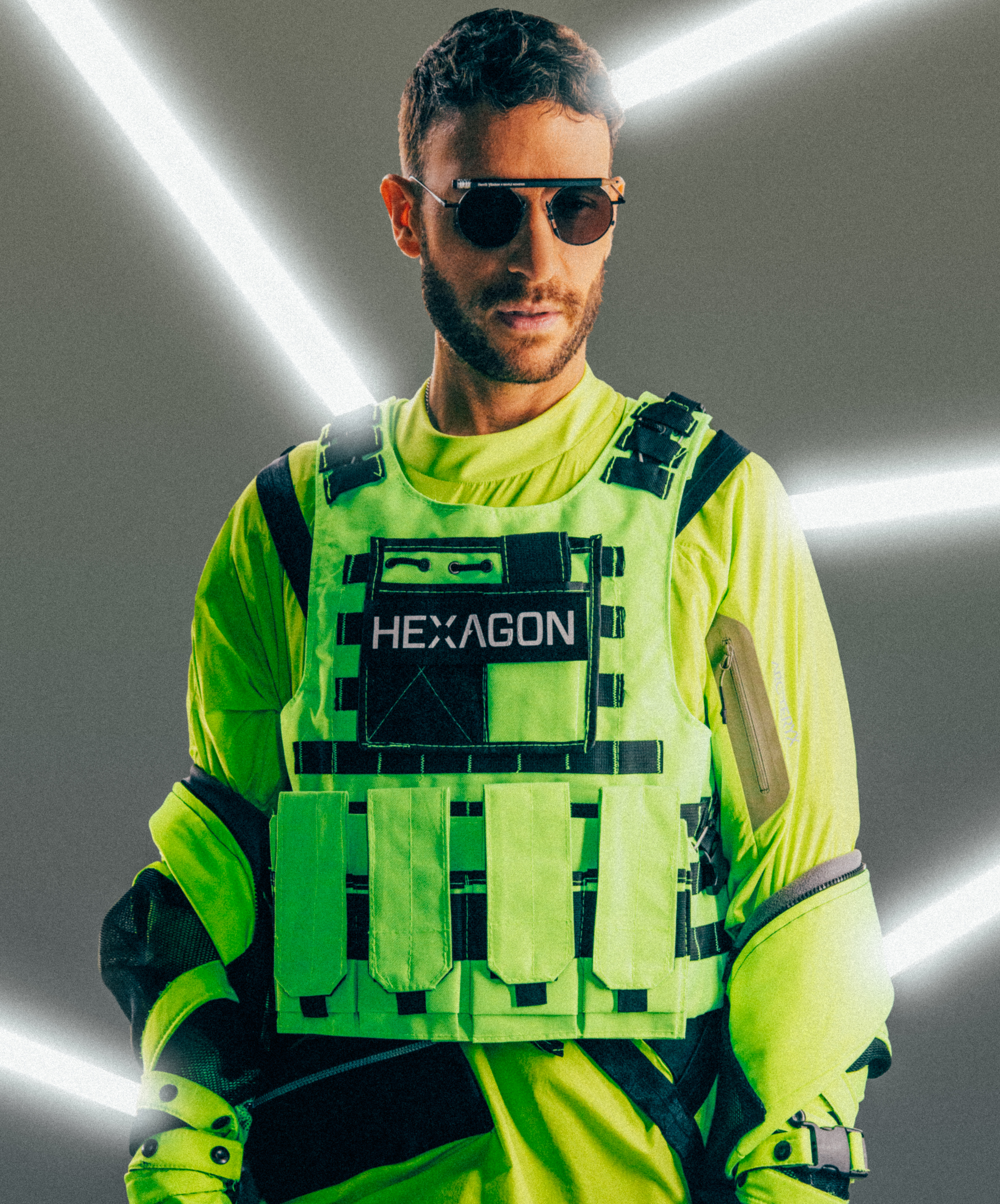
- Diablo in 2022

Background information
- Also known as: Big Pineapple, Camp Kubrick, Lunar Lo-Fi, CONTROL ALT DΞLΞTΞ
- Born: Don Pepijn Schipper; 27 February 1980 (age 46)
- Origin: Coevorden, Netherlands
- Genres: Future house; house; drum and bass; tropical house; future bass
- Occupations: DJ; record producer
- Instruments: Keyboards
- Years active: 1995–present
- Labels: HEXAGON; Universal Music Group; Sony Music; Atlantic Records; Spinnin'; NoCopyrightSounds
- Website: www.dondiablo.com

Don Pepijn Schipper (Dutch pronunciation: [ˈdɔn pəˈpɛin ˈsxɪpər]; born 27 February 1980), better known by his stage name Don Diablo, is a Dutch DJ, digital artist, record producer, musician and songwriter of electronic dance music. He is one of the pioneers of the future house genre and was ranked sixth in the Top 100 DJs – 2020 list by DJ Mag. He was also ranked number one Producer of the Year for 2018 by 1001Tracklists. In 2016, he was ranked the number one Future House Artist of the Year on Beatport.

In 2015, he founded his own record label, HEXAGON.

== Career ==
=== 1995–2005: early years ===
Diablo played in clubs all over the world and at various festivals including Glastonbury, Lowlands, Creamfields & Ministry Of Sound.

Between 1995 and 2005 Diablo produced for other acts and bands and released his own music under different aliases including "Dave Mitchell", "The Raven", "Batteries Not Included", "Dahlio Bond" & "Skip Donner".

In 2004, he launched his separate music project called Divided. The project had two hits "The Music, the People" credited to Divided featuring Diablo in 2004, followed by "Easy Lover" in 2005, credited to Diablo presents Divided, a dance remake of the joint hit of Philip Bailey and Phil Collins in 1985, Divided remake coming after twenty years of the release of the original.

=== 2006–2009: Life Is a Festival ===
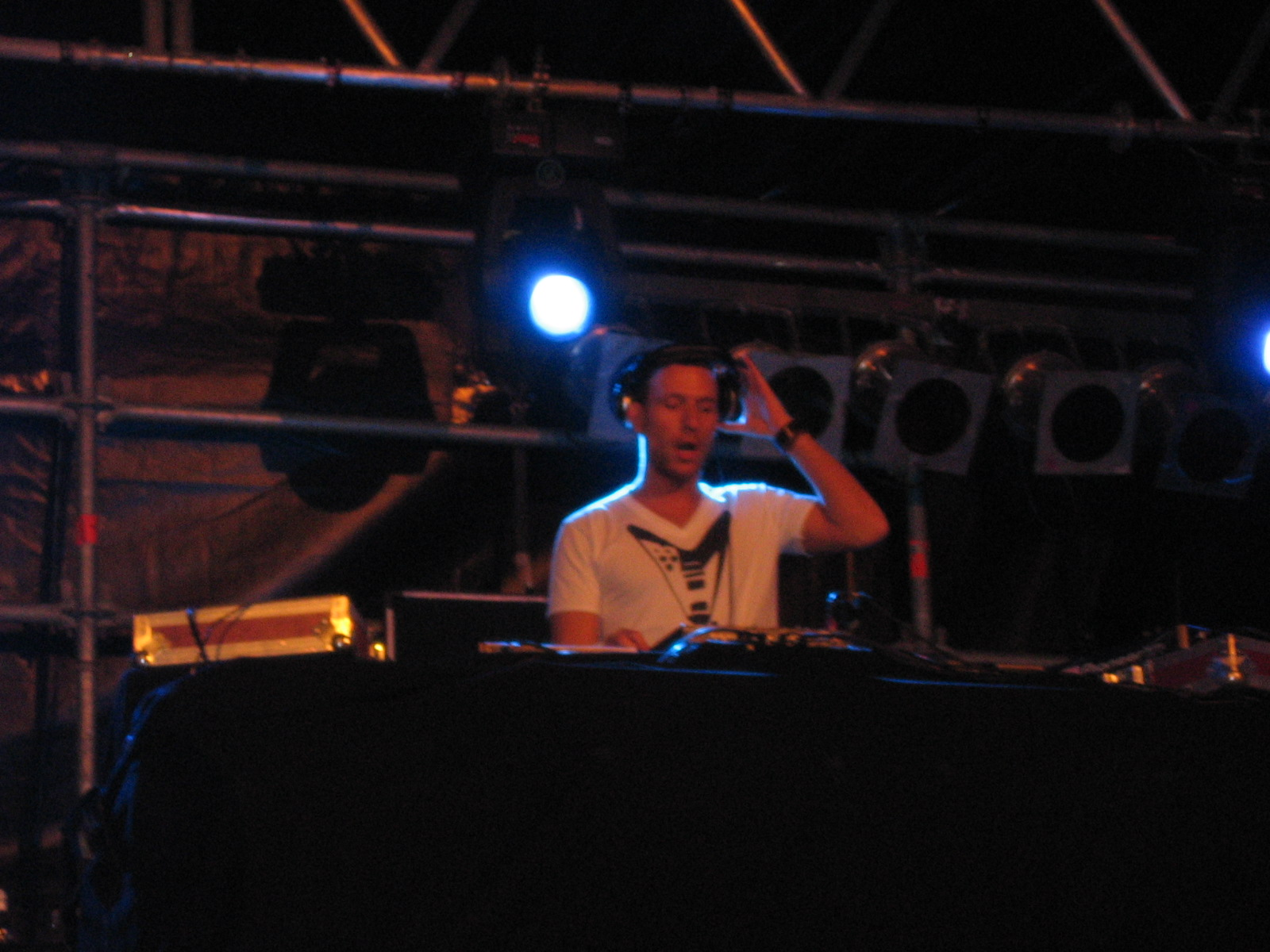
Diablo performing in 2008

In 2006, Diablo was signed and A&R'ed the UK top 3 chart hit "Exceeder" by Mason. The record was originally signed to Middle of the Road, a record label set up by Diablo and Amsterdam-based club promoter Roy Avni (Electro Nation). In 2008, Diablo released his debut album "Life Is a Festival". In 2009, Diablo released "Hooligans", a collaboration with English singer, songwriter, rapper and record producer Example.

=== 2010–2013 ===
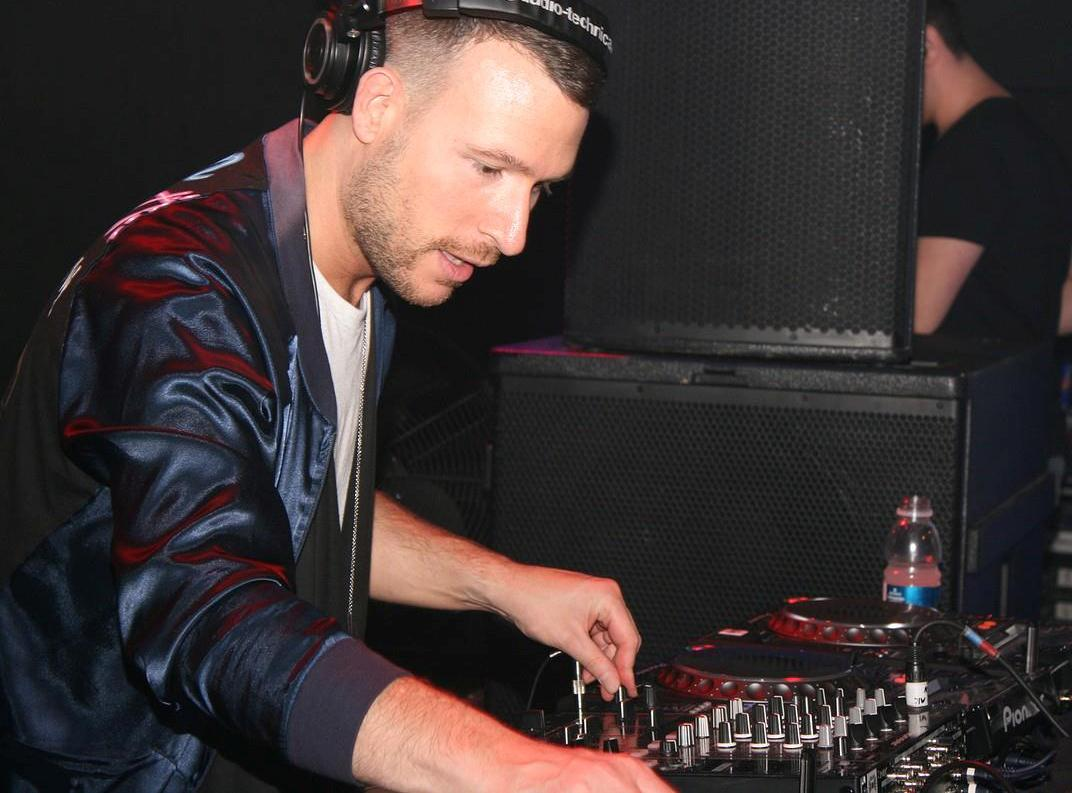
Diablo performing in 2013

In 2010, a collaboration with Dragonette resulted in the single "Animale" that charted in the Dutch Singles Chart as well as the Belgian Ultratip chart. The music video was also nominated for a TMF Award in the Netherlands.

In 2013 Diablo released new songs on Axwell's Axtone label, Nicky Romero's Protocol Recordings, Steve Angello's Size X imprint and Spinnin' Records label. He created the theme song for the 2013 video game Batman: Arkham Origins.

His song "Starlight (Could You Be Mine)" was debuted during the last Swedish House Mafia concert, after Axwell signed it to his label. The song became a Beatport Top 5 hit, and later several of his other releases reached the Beatport Top 10.

In 2013, Pete Tong debuted six of Don's releases on his BBC Radio 1 show. He had a residency at Las Vegas' night club "Light", played the Departures Ibiza closing party alongside Axwell and Sebastian Ingrosso, and toured the UK. He also had sold-out solo tours in Asia and the United States in this period.

=== 2014–2016 ===
In 2014, Diablo premiered his new visual concept "The Hexagon" with Los Angeles-based visual company "VSquared Labs".

In October 2014, Diablo made his debut on DJ Mag's Top 100 DJs list at No. 82. In October 2015, Diablo was awarded with DJ Magazine's "highest climber of the year" prize, jumping 52 places to No. 30 on the Top 100 DJs list for 2015.

Diablo launched his Hexagon record label. The first release, a remix of Alex Adair's "You Make Me Feel Better" held the no. 1 position on Beatport for almost seven weeks and the label was awarded "Best New Label of The Year".

In 2015 his HEXAGON radio show was aired in over 35 countries and holds a top 10 position in the iTunes podcast section every week.

Diablo has directed most of his own music videos. In 2013 Warner Brothers asked Don to create the worldwide theme song for the much acclaimed Batman: Arkham Origins game.

In 2015 Diablo collaborated with fellow Dutch DJ Tiësto on the track "Chemicals" featuring vocals from Danish singer and producer Thomas Troelsen.

Throughout 2016 and 2017, Diablo went on Tour Across Europe, this sold out across multiple venues including his first headline show in London.

=== 2017: Past.Present.Future ===
In 2017, Don Diablo released Past.Present.Future, a compilation of previously released tracks, including hits "On My Mind," "Cutting Shapes," and his collaboration with Tiësto "Chemicals" featuring Thomas Troelsen.

Diablo won DJ Mag's 2017 Highest Future House award and was ranked #11 overall in the DJ Mag Top 100 Poll.

A packed global tour schedule saw him play the mainstages of Tomorrowland, EDC, Creamfields, Mysteryland, Lollapalooza, and Ultra Music Festival whilst selling out his Headline Artist shows in the UK, US & European markets.

In November 2017, Diablo released "Take Her Place" with electronic trio Arizona.

=== 2018–2023: Future and Forever ===
On 19 January 2018, Diablo released the seventh single from Future, "People Say", with actor/songwriter, Paije Richardson. On 8 February, he embarked on his sold out Future North American Tour, making stops at Los Angeles' Fonda Theatre and New York's Terminal 5, among others. His second studio album, Future, was released via his label Hexagon on 9 February 2018. On 13 March, he released the eighth single to Future entitled "Head Up" with singer James Newman. On 23 March, he released the ninth single to FUTURE entitled "Believe", available on the deluxe edition (released same day) with actor/singer-songwriter Ansel Elgort. On 25 April he released the tenth single to FUTURE entitled "Give Me Love" with singer Calum Scott. On 15 October 2018, he ranked #1 as the world's most DJ-supported producer, according to 1001Tracklists, a website logging DJ support from festival recordings, radio shows, and DJ mixes.

In 2018, Diablo released his first remix compilation "Reconstructions". In 2021 he released "Reconstructions 2". The compilations include remixes he did for: Ed Sheeran, Rihanna, Madonna, Justin Bieber, Dua Lipa, Panic! At The Disco, Ellie Goulding, Mark Ronson, Miley Cyrus, Coldplay and others.

On 18 September 2020, he launched Camp Kubrick with Denzel Chain, an 80s style inspired duo releasing the single "Johnny's Online".

On 20 March 2021, "Genesis by Don Diablo" was sold on NFT marketplace "SuperRare". On 9 April 2021, Diablo broke the primary sales record at SuperRare with his feature length NFT project "Destination Hexagonia".

On 11 June 2021, Diablo announced his partnership with environmental charity organization "Justdiggit" in collaboration with the United Nations (not to be confused with the dance music act Uniting Nations). Their Stream-To-Regreen campaign kicked off with a collaboration between Don Diablo and Ty Dolla $ign. In July 2021, the second Star Wars x Don Diablo collectible launched in collaboration with Lucasfilm, Disney and StockX. On 10 September 2021, Diablo released his album "FORΞVΞR" which included collaborations with: Ty Dolla $ign, Trevor Daniel, Jessie J, Galantis, Gucci Mane, Emeli Sandé, Nate Dogg, Andy Grammer and more. In June 2021, Diablo was included in the Natively Digital Auction by Sotheby's Auction House with his work "INFINITΞ FUTURΞ". His second work auctioned by Sotheby's, titled "HEXHIBIT III" was auctioned on 7 December 2021. The work was publicly premiered on the Museumplein in Amsterdam and then exhibited at the MOCO Museum, also in Amsterdam.

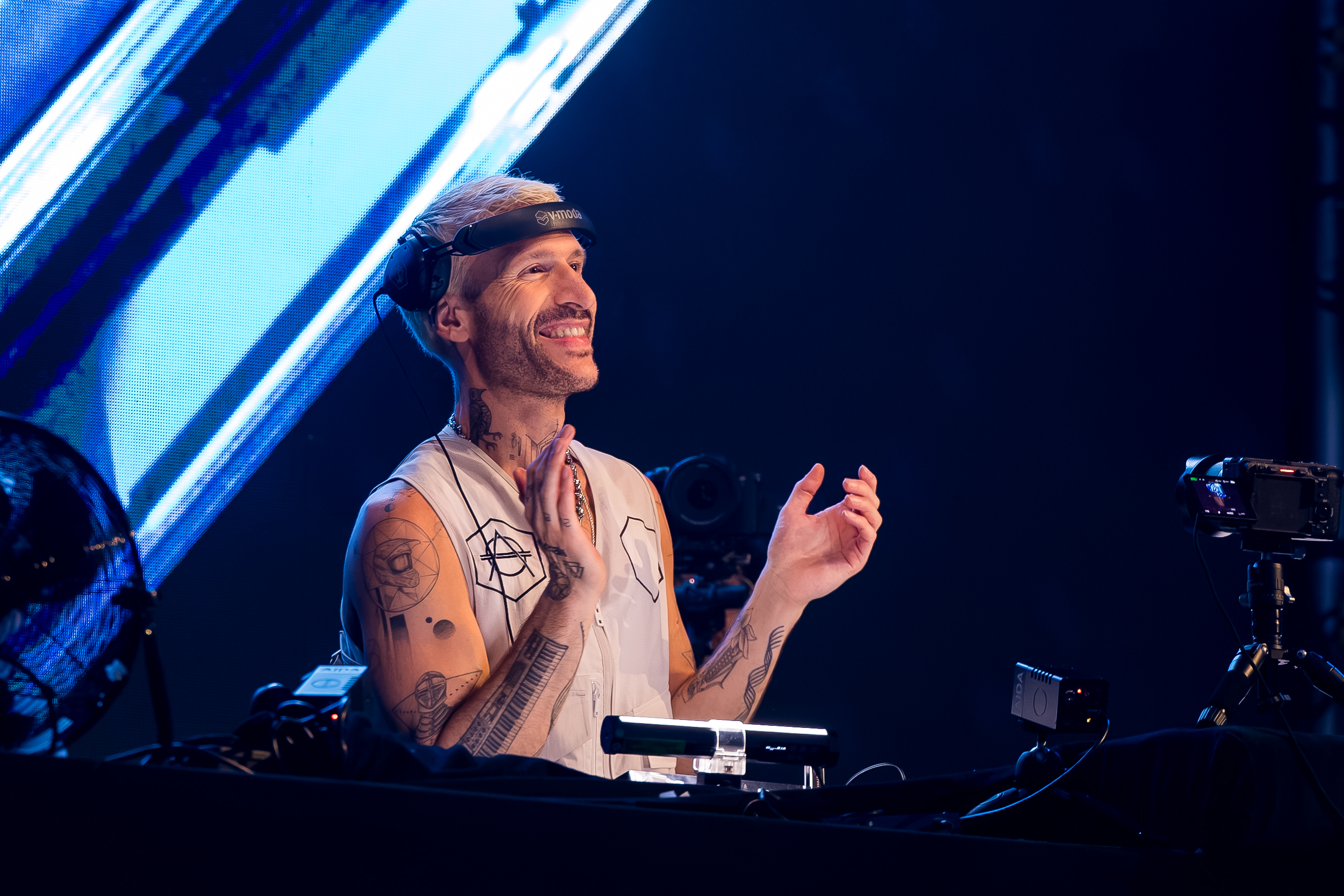
Diablo performing in 2026

=== 2024-present: Aliases and collaborations ===
On 19 January 2024, Diablo launched his lo-fi alias Lunar Lo-Fi, with the single "Eclipse".

On 24 January 2025, Diablo launched his drum & bass alias "Control Alt Delete" (stylised "CONTROL ALT DΞLΞTΞ"), with the single "Maniac", a cover of Michael Sembello’s 80’s hit. On May 30, 2025, he released the single "Doing Nothin'" alongside Nelly Furtado; the song was an interpolated remix to Furtado's 2012 single "Parking Lot".

== Discography ==
- 2 Faced (2004)
- Life Is a Festival (2008)
- Future (2018)
- Forever (2021)

== Awards and nominations ==
Year	Event	Award	Recipient	Result
2007	TMF Awards	Best Music Video	"Pain is Temporary, Pride is Forever"	Nominated
2011	TMF Awards	Best Music Video	"Animale"	Nominated
2011	3FM Awards	Best Artist Dance	Don Diablo	Nominated
2012	3FM Awards	Best Artist Dance	Don Diablo	Nominated
2016	EMPO Awards	Producer of the Year	Don Diablo	Won
2016	EMPO Awards	Best Future House DJ	Don Diablo	Won
2017	WDM Radio Awards	Best Electro House DJ	Don Diablo	Nominated
2017	WDM Radio Awards	Best Remix	"Keeping Your Head Up"	Nominated
2018	WDM Radio Awards	Best Electro House DJ	Don Diablo	Won
2018	WDM Radio Awards	Best Remix	"Something Just like This"	Won

=== DJ Magazine Top 100 DJs ===
Year	Position	Notes	Ref.
2014	82	New Entry	
2015	30	Up 52	
2016	15	Up 15	
2017	11	Up 4	
2018	7	Up 4	
2019	6	Up 1	
2020	6	No Change	
2021	7	Down 1	
2022	9	Down 2	
2023	13	Down 4	
2024	15	Down 2	
2025	13	Up 2	

=== 1001Tracklists Top 101 Producers ===
Year	Position	Notes	Ref.
2016	7	New Entry	
2017	2	Up 5	
2018	1	Up 4	
2019	5	Down 4	
2020	8	Down 3	
2021	38	Down 30	
2022	44	Down 6	
2023	59	Down 15	
2024	32	Up 27	
