= Wiley discography =

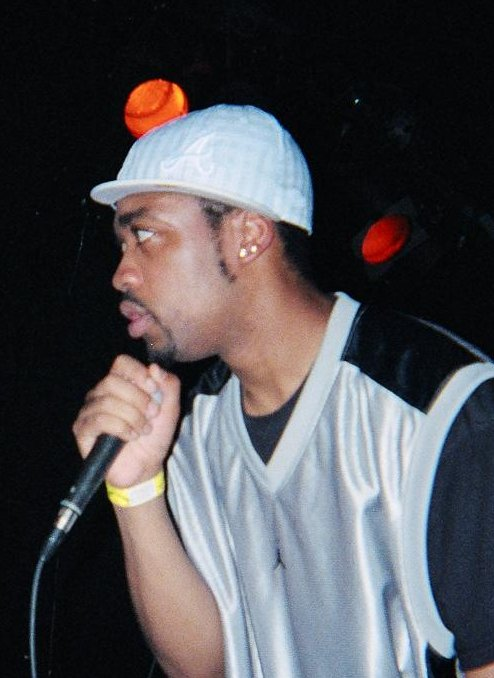
- Wiley in 2005.
- Studio albums: 15
- Singles: 29
- Music videos: 60
- Guest appearances: 78

British rapper Wiley has released 15 studio albums and 29 singles.

== Albums ==
=== Studio albums ===
List of solo studio albums, with selected chart positions
Title	Album details	Peak chart positions	
Title	Album details	UK	UK R&B
Treddin' on Thin Ice	Released: 26 April 2004; Label: XL; Formats: CD, digital download	45	—
Da 2nd Phaze	Released: 1 July 2006; Label: Boy Better Know; Formats: CD, digital download	—	—
Playtime Is Over	Released: 4 June 2007; Label: Big Dada; Formats: CD, digital download	71	6
Grime Wave	Released: 25 May 2008; Label: Eskibeat Recordings; Formats: CD, digital download	—	—
See Clear Now	Released: 10 November 2008; Label: Asylum; Formats: CD, digital download	139	—
Race Against Time	Released: 8 June 2009; Label: Eskibeat Recordings; Formats: CD, digital download	130	—
100% Publishing	Released: 20 June 2011; Label: Big Dada; Formats: CD, digital download	76	10
Evolve or Be Extinct	Released: 19 January 2012; Label: Big Dada; Formats: CD, digital download	86	11
The Ascent	Released: 1 April 2013; Label: Warner Music Group; Formats: CD, digital download	26	—
Snakes & Ladders	Released: 3 November 2014; Label: Big Dada; Formats: CD, digital download	69	4
Godfather	Released: 13 January 2017; Label: CTA Records; Formats: CD, digital download; BPI: Silver	9	1
Godfather II	Released: 27 April 2018; Label: CTA Records; Formats: CD, digital download	58	8
The Godfather III	Released: 5 June 2020; Label: Wiley Records; Formats: CD, digital download	—	3
Boasty Gang – The Album	Released: 22 June 2020; Label: Wiley Records; Formats: CD, digital download	—	—
Anti-Systemic	Released: 10 September 2021; Label: Wiley Records; Formats: CD, digital download	—	—
"—" denotes a title that did not chart, or was not released in that territory.

=== Extended plays ===
Title	EP details
Chill Out Zone	Released: 12 July 2011; Label: Elusive Entertainment; Formats: digital download
#8	Released: 26 July 2015; Label: CTA Records; Formats: CD, digital download

=== Mixtapes ===
Title	Mixtape details
Tunnel Vision Vol. 1	Released: 2006; Label: Boy Better Know; Format: CD, digital download
Tunnel Vision Vol. 2	Released: 2006; Label: Boy Better Know; Format: CD, digital download
Tunnel Vision Vol. 3	Released: 2006; Label: Boy Better Know; Format: CD, digital download
Tunnel Vision Vol. 4	Released: 2007; Label: Boy Better Know; Format: CD, digital download
Tunnel Vision Vol. 5	Released: 2007; Label: Boy Better Know; Format: CD, digital download
Tunnel Vision Vol. 6	Released: 2008; Label: Eskibeat Recordings; Format: CD, digital download
Umbrella Vol. 1	Released: 1 February 2008; Label: Eskibeat Recordings; Format: CD, digital download
The Elusive	Released: 8 July 2010; Label: Self-released; Format: digital download
Offload Vol. 1	Released: 4 March 2011; Label: A-List Music Ltd.; Format: digital download
Creating a Buzz Vol. 1	Released: 6 July 2011; Hosted by: DJ Whoo Kid; Label: Self-released; Format: digital download
It's All Fun and Games Till Vol. 1	Released: 21 May 2012; Label: Self-released; Format: digital download
It's All Fun and Games Till Vol. 2	Released: 21 March 2013; Label: Self-released; Format: digital download
Ya Dun Know Vol. 1	Released: 6 March 2014; Label: Self-released; Format: digital download

=== Instrumentals ===
Title	Mixtape details
Avalanche Music 1	Released: 31 March 2010; Label: Avalanche Music; Format: CD, digital download
Run the Riddim Selecta	Released: 9 March 2011; Label: Elusive Entertainment; Format: digital download

=== Miscellaneous ===
Title	Mixtape details
Zip Files 01-11	Released: 8 July 2010; Label: Self-released; Format: digital download
The Grime Leaks	Released: 20 December 2010; Label: Self-released; Format: digital download
Twitter Mix 2011	Released: 21 December 2011; Label: Self-released; Format: digital download
Twitter Downloads 2012	Released: 27 May 2012; Label: Self-released; Format: digital download

=== With Roll Deep ===
Title	Album & Mixtape Details	Certifications
Creeper Vol. 1	Released: 2004–2005; Label: Roll Deep Recordings; Format: digital download	
Creeper Vol. 2	Released: 2004–2005; Label: Roll Deep Recordings; Format: digital download	
In at the Deep End	Released: 6 June 2005; Label: Relentless Records/ Virgin Records; Format: CD, digital download	UK: Silver
Roll Deep Presents Grimey Vol. 1	Released: 27 February 2006; Label: Roll Deep Recordings; Format: CD, digital download	
Rules and Regulations	Released: 26 March 2007; Label: Roll Deep Recordings; Format: CD, digital download	
Return of the Big Money Sound	Released: 6 September 2008; Label: Roll Deep Recordings; Format: CD, digital download	
Street Anthems	Released: 19 October 2009; Label: Roll Deep Recordings; Format: CD, digital download	
Say No More	Released: 16 August 2010; Label: Roll Deep Recordings; Format: digital download	
Winner Stays On	Released: 8 November 2010; Label: Relentless Records/Virgin Records; Format: CD, digital download	

=== With Boy Better Know ===
Title	Album & Mixtape Details
Da 2nd Phaze	Released: 1 July 2006; Label: Boy Better Know; Format: CD, digital download
Tunnel Vision 1-5	Released: 2006–2008; Label: Boy Better Know; Format: CD, Digital download

== Singles ==
=== As lead artist ===
Title	Year	Peak chart positions								Certifications	Album
Title	Year	UK	UK R&B	UK DAN	UK IND	AUS	DEN	IRE	SCO	Certifications	Album
"Wot Do U Call It?"	2004	31	—	—	2	—	—	—	—		Treddin' on Thin Ice
"Pies"	2004	45	—	—	7	—	—	—	—		Treddin' on Thin Ice
"50/50"	2007	—	—	—	—	—	—	—	—		Playtime Is Over
"My Mistakes" (featuring Manga & Little Dee)	2007	76	—	—	—	—	—	—	—		Playtime Is Over
"Wearing My Rolex"	2008	2	—	1	—	—	32	31	—	BPI: Platinum	See Clear Now
"Summertime"	2008	45	3	—	—	—	—	—	—		See Clear Now
"Cash in My Pocket" (featuring Daniel Merriweather)	2008	18	—	—	—	—	—	—	—		See Clear Now
"Take That" (featuring Chew Fu)	2009	20	—	—	—	—	—	—	—		Non-album singles
"Never Be Your Woman" (featuring Emeli Sandé)	2010	8	4	—	—	—	—	—	—	BPI: Silver	Non-album singles
"Numbers in Action"	2011	55	—	—	27	—	—	—	—		100% Publishing
"If I Could" (featuring Ed Sheeran)	2011	43	—	—	26	—	—	—	—		Chill Out Zone
"Boom Blast"	2012	103	—	—	9	—	—	—	—		Evolve or Be Extinct
"Heatwave" (featuring Ms D)	2012	1	—	1	—	31	—	8	1	BPI: 2× Platinum	The Ascent
"Can You Hear Me? (Ayayaya)" (featuring Skepta, JME & Ms D)	2012	3	—	1	—	—	—	26	3	BPI: Platinum	The Ascent
"Reload" (featuring Chip & Ms D)	2013	9	—	—	—	—	—	83	10	BPI: Silver	The Ascent
"Lights On" (featuring Angel & Tinchy Stryder)	2013	9	—	3	—	—	—	47	8		The Ascent
"You Know the Words"	2014	—	—	—	—	—	—	—	—		Non-album single
"On a Level"	2014	55	—	—	—	—	—	—	—		Snakes & Ladders
"Chasing the Art"	2015	88	—	—	—	—	—	—	—		Non-album single
"Can't Go Wrong"^{3}	2016	—	—	—	10	—	—	—	—		Godfather
"Bring Them All / Holy Grime" (featuring Devlin)	2016	—	—	—	39	—	—	—	—		Godfather
"U Were Always, Pt. 2" (featuring Skepta and Belly)	2016	—	—	—	38	—	—	—	—		Godfather
"Speakerbox"	2017	—	—	—	—	—	—	—	—		Godfather
"Call the Shots" (featuring Jme)	2017	—	—	—	—	—	—	—	—		Godfather II
"Bar" (featuring Scratchy and D Double E)	2017	—	—	—	—	—	—	—	—		Godfather II
"Been a While"	2018	—	—	—	—	—	—	—	—		Godfather II
"Remember Me"	2018	—	—	—	—	—	—	—	—		Godfather II
"Boasty" (with Stefflon Don and Sean Paul featuring Idris Elba)	2019	11	—	—	—	—	—	82	31	BPI: Platinum	Non-album singles
"My One" (featuring Tory Lanez, Kranium and Dappy)	2019	41	—	—	—	—	—	84	—	BPI: Silver	Non-album singles
"6pm Somewhere" (Hooligan Hefs with Wiley)	2026	—	—	—	—	—	—	—	—		Sixth Sense
"—" denotes a title that did not chart, or was not released in that territory.

^{1}Singles were on the original version of Snakes & Ladders which was scrapped
^{2}Single released by Wiley's ex-label. Disowned by the artist.
^{3}Also featured in the 2018 film Final Score

=== As featured artist ===
Title	Year	Peak chart positions			Album
Title	Year	UK	IRE	SCO	Album
"Business Man (Black Noise Remix)" (Crookers featuring Wiley & Thomas Jules)	2002	—	—	—	Ministry of Sound: Clubbers Guide Electro
"2 Far" (Dizzee Rascal featuring Wiley)	2003	—	—	—	Boy in da Corner
"Doin It Again" (with Boy Better Know)	2007	—	—	—	Greatest Hits
"Single Remix" (Skepta featuring JME & Wiley)	2007	—	—	—	Greatest Hits
"Catch Up" (Mz. Bratt featuring Devilman & Wiley)	2007	—	—	—	Give It To Em Vol 1
"R U Dumb?" (JME featuring Wiley)	2008	—	—	—	Famous?
"Mum Im Stronger" (JME featuring Wiley)	2008	—	—	—	Famous?
"Dem Na Like Me" (Qemists featuring Wiley)	2008	—	—	—	Join The Q
"Anywhere We Go" (Kano featuring. Wiley)	2008	—	—	—	140 Grime Street
"Say What You Like" (Chipmunk featuring Skepta & Wiley)	2008	89	—	—	Guess Who?
"Too Many Man" (with Boy Better Know)	2009	79	—	—	Microphone Champion / Race Against Time
"Are You Ready?" (Skepta featuring Wiley)	2009	—	—	—	Microphone Champion
"Stryderman Remix" (Tinchy Stryder featuring Wiley)	2009	—	—	—	Catch 22
"I Know" (Scorcher featuring J2K & Wiley)	2009	—	—	—	Concrete Jungle
"We're Rollin" (K.I.G featuring Wiley)	2009	—	—	—	Non-album singles
"Skool Daze" (Cherri V featuring Wiley)	2010	200	—	—	Non-album singles
"Spaceman" (Mumzy Stranger featuring Steel Banglez & Wiley)	2010	—	—	—	Journey Begins
"Go Hard" (Fugative featuring Mz Bratt & Wiley)	2010	—	—	—	No Goin' Home
"Get Wild" (Kano featuring Aidonia & Wiley)	2010	136	—	—	Method to the Maadness
"Sidetracked" (JME featuring Wiley)	2010	147	—	—	Blam!
"2010" (Chipmunk featuring Wiley)	2010	116	—	—	For The Fun of It
"Between Us" (Mashtown featuring Wiley)	2010	—	—	—	Non-album singles
"Now or Never" (Jodie Connor featuring Wiley)	2010	14	—	18	Non-album singles
"Sidechain" (Mz Bratt featuring Wiley)	2011	—	—	—	Elements
"You" (Ed Sheeran featuring Wiley)	2011	65	—	—	No. 5 Collaborations Project
"Pow 2011" (Lethal Bizzle featuring JME, Wiley, Chipmunk, Face, P Money, Ghetts & Kano)	2011	33	—	—	Best of Bizzle
"Gleamin" (Angel featuring Maxsta & Wiley)	2012	68	—	—	7 Minutes Before Time
"Visa" (Tulisa featuring Wiley)	2012	44	—	—	The Female Boss
"Tough Got Going" (Angel featuring Wiley & Cherise)	2012	—	—	—	In Between Time
"Whistle at Me" (Jin Jin and the Ragdolls featuring Wiley)	2012	—	—	—	Rhythm Homicide
"Banger" (JME featuring Wiley)	2013	126	—	—	Non-album single
"Animal" (Conor Maynard featuring Wiley)	2013	6	27	6	Contrast
"We party hard, we never rest (Steel Banglez)" (Popek featuring Wiley)	2013	—	—	—	Monster
"They Got It Wrong" (Lethal Bizzle featuring Wiley)	2013	74	—	—	Non-album singles
"Arrogant" (Solo 45 featuring Wiley)	2013	—	—	—	Non-album singles
"Wiggle (Movin' Her Middle)" (Mike Delinquent Project featuring Wiley)	2014	—	—	—	Non-album singles
"Bus Pass" (A.M. SNiPER featuring Wiley)	2014	—	—	—	Non-album singles
"Crazy for Your Love" (Rymez featuring Wiley, Sneakbo & Sarah Harding)	2014	—	—	—	Non-album singles
"Ah Yeah So What"	2014	—	—	—	Non-album singles
"Move with the Times" (Funky Dee featuring Wiley)	2016	—	—	—	Best of Both Worlds - EP
"—" denotes a title that did not chart, or was not released in that territory

== Other charted songs ==
Title	Year	Peak chart positions	Album
Title	Year	UK	Album
"50/50/Badman Talking" (featuring Flow Dan)	2007	—	Playtime Is Over
"She's Glowing'" (featuring Kano & Ghetts)	2009	—	Race Against Time
"She Likes Too" (featuring England's Top 10)	2009	—	Offload Vol 1
"Electric Boogaloo" (featuring Jodie Connor & J2K)	2010	107	Non-album singles
"Midnight Lover" (featuring A-List)	2010	—	Non-album singles
"Seduction" (featuring Alexa Goddard)	2011	—	Chill Out Zone
"—" denotes a title that did not chart, or was not released in that territory.

== Music videos ==
=== As lead artist ===
Year	Title
2004	"Wot Do U Call It?"
2004	"Pies"
2005	"The Avenue" (with Roll Deep)
2005	"Shake a Leg" (with Roll Deep)
2006	"When I'm 'Ere" (with Roll Deep)
2007	"My Mistakes" / "Gangsters" (featuring Manga & Little Dee)
2007	"50/50" / "Badman Talking" (featuring Flow Dan)
2008	"Wearing My Rolex"
2008	"Summertime"
2008	"Cash in My Pocket" (featuring Daniel Merriweather)
2009	"She Glows" (featuring Kano & Ghetts)
2009	"Too Many Man" (with Boy Better Know)
2009	"She Likes Too" (with England's Top 10)
2009	"Take That" (featuring Chew Fu)
2010	"Never Be Your Woman" (featuring Emeli Sandé)
2010	"Electric Boogaloo" (featuring Jodie Connor & J2K)
2010	"Party Poper" / "Bumper Like"
2010	"Midnight Lover" (with A-List)
2010	"Good Times" (with Roll Deep)
2010	"Green Light" (with Roll Deep)
2011	"Numbers in Action"
2011	"If I Could" (featuring Ed Sheeran)
2011	"Seduction" (featuring Alexa Goddard)
2012	"Boom Blast"
2012	"Hottie" (featuring Manga)
2012	"Evolve or Be Extinct"
2012	"Daiquiris"
2012	"Hover Board"
2012	"Only Human" (featuring Cashtastic & Terezza)
2012	"Heatwave" (featuring Ms D)
2012	"Can You Hear Me? (Ayayaya)" (featuring Skepta, Jme & Ms D)
2013	"Reload" (featuring Chip & Ms D)
2013	"Lights On" (featuring Angel & Tinchy Stryder)
2013	"Flying"
2013	"And Again" (featuring God's Gift)
2014	"You Know the Words"
2014	"On a Level"
2015	"Chasing the Art"
2015	"25 MCs"
2015	"P Money"
2016	"Can't Go Wrong"
2016	"Bring Them All" / "Holy Grime" (featuring Devlin)
2016	"U Were Always, Pt. 2" (featuring Skepta & Belly)
2016	"6 in the Bloodclart Morning"
2016	"Speaker Box"
2017	"Handle Ya Business"
2017	"Call the Shots" (featuring Jme)
2019	"Boasty" (with Sean Paul & Stefflon Don featuring Idris Elba)
2019	"My One" (featuring Tory Lanez, Kranium & Dappy)
2019	"Certified" (featuring Shakka)
2019	"Givenchy Bag" (featuring Chip, Future & Nafe Smallz)
2019	"Sorry" (featuring Lickle Jay & Riko)
2019	"No Lie" (featuring Margs, Kaos & Joe Black)
2019	"Quick to Forget"
2020	"Eediyat Skengman 2"
2020	"Eediyat Skengman 3"
2020	"The Game (Freestyle)"
2020	"Wearing My Rolex (Remix)" (featuring Hypo)
2020	"Drip Insured" (featuring Lotto Ash)
