= Jake Gosling discography =

Discography

This is the Jake Gosling discography, giving an overview of the albums, EPs and singles that Gosling produced.

== Studio albums ==
- Anthems For Doomed Youth - The Libertines
- x - Ed Sheeran
- Midnight Memories - One Direction
- Head or Heart - Christina Perri
- Peroxide - Nina Nesbitt
- All We Are - ORB
- Take Me Home - One Direction
- Fire Within - Birdy
- Up All Night - One Direction
- Fall to Grace - Paloma Faith
- This Life - The Original Rudeboys
- + - Ed Sheeran
- See Clear Now - Wiley
- Illuminate - Shawn Mendes
- Now - Shania Twain
- Dancing Shadows - Mario

== Extended plays ==
- Loose Change - Ed Sheeran
- Songs I Wrote with Amy - Ed Sheeran
- Live at the Bedford - Ed Sheeran
- No. 5 Collaborations Project - Ed Sheeran
- The Slumdon Bridge- Ed Sheeran (with Yelawolf)
- Apple Tree EP - Nina Nesbitt
- Suddenly, Everything's Changing - AmiiFy

== Singles produced ==
- Mercy - Shawn Mendes
- Smile - Gorgon City Feat Elderbrook
- Little Things - One Direction
- Thinking Out Loud - Ed Sheeran
- The A Team - Ed Sheeran
- Lego House - Ed Sheeran
- Give Me Love - Ed Sheeran
- You Need Me, I Don't Need You - Ed Sheeran
- Drunk - Ed Sheeran
- Small Bump - Ed Sheeran
- Picking Up The Pieces - Paloma Faith
- Just Be - Paloma Faith
- Black and Blue - Paloma Faith
- 30 Minute Love Affair - Paloma Faith
- Tattoo - Hilary Duff
- The Apple Tree - Nina Nesbitt
- Boy - Nina Nesbitt
- Stay Out - Nina Nesbitt
- Way In The World - Nina Nesbitt
- Summertime - Wiley
- Cash In My Pocket - Wiley
- See Clear Now - Wiley
- Long May They Roll - James Jay Picton
- The Message - Nate James
- Dirty Rider - Mikill Pane
- Chairman Of The Bored - Mikill Pane
- Summer In The City - Mikill Pane
- Play It Loud - Giggs
- Old School Love - Lupe Ft Ed Sheeran
- Fire - Jeluzz ft Jake Gosling
- Its My Time - Scorcher

== Songwriting credits ==
- Smile - Gorgon City Feat Elderbrook
- Drunk - Ed Sheeran
- Give Me Love - Ed Sheeran
- Lego House - Ed Sheeran
- The City - Ed Sheeran
- The Parting Glass - Ed Sheeran
- U.N.I - Ed Sheeran
- Wake Me Up - Ed Sheeran
- Autumn Leaves - Ed Sheeran
- Lately - Ed Sheeran
- You - Ed Sheeran
- Family - Ed Sheeran
- Radio - Ed Sheeran
- Drown Me Out - Ed Sheeran
- Nightmares - Ed Sheeran
- Goodbye To You - Ed Sheeran
- Summertime - Wiley
- See Clear Now - Wiley
- I Need To Be - Wiley
- 5am - Wiley
- Turn It Up - Wiley
- Can't Stop Thinking - Wiley
- No Interest - Nina Nesbitt
- Way In The World - Nina Nesbitt
- Align - Nina Nesbitt
- 18 Candles - Nina Nesbitt
- Tough Luck - Nina Nesbitt
- The Apple Tree - Nina Nesbitt
- Some You Win - Nina Nesbitt
- Unhappy Ending - Jenna Andrews
- Tattoo - Hilary Duff
- Dirty Rider - Mikill Pane
- The Craig Bang - Mikill Pane
- Chairman of Bored - Mikill Pane
- Summer in the City - Mikill Pane
- Straight to the Bottom - Mikill Pane
- Play It Loud - Giggs ft. Ed Sheeran
- Blank Page -Jezzabell Doran
- Home - Birdy
- Planes Fly - Angle Haze
- What If - The ORB
- Never Alone - ORB
- Can't Let Go - ORB
- Travelling Man - ORB
- Blue Eyes - ORB
- Written Songs - ORB
- Holiday - KSI
