= Numbers in Action =

Single by Wiley

from the album 100% Publishing
- Released: 5 April 2011 (UK)
- Genre: Grime; eskibeat
- Length: 3:12 (Radio edit)
- Label: Big Dada
- Songwriter(s): Richard Cowie
- Producer(s): Wiley

Wiley singles chronology
"Pow 2011" (2011)	"Numbers in Action" (2011)	"If I Could" (2011)

"Numbers in Action" is a single from British grime artist Wiley. It is the first single released from his seventh album 100% Publishing. It was released on 5 April 2011 as a Digital download.

== Music video ==
The music video was uploaded to YouTube on 14 April 2011.

== Track listings ==
Digital download

1. "Numbers in Action" (Radio Edit) – 3:12

Digital download – EP

1. "Numbers in Action" – 3:23
2. "Numbers in Action" (Sticky Remix) – 3:59
3. "Numbers in Action" (Dobie's Crunch Music Remix) – 2:52
4. "Numbers in Action" (Toddska Remix) – 4:20
5. "Numbers in Action" (ZDot Remix) – 2:52

== Credits and personnel ==
- Lead vocals – Wiley
- Producer – Wiley
- Lyrics – Richard Cowie
- Label: Big Dada

== Chart performance ==
Chart (2011)	Peak position
UK Indie (OCC)	27

== Release history ==
Country	Date	Format	Label
United Kingdom	5 April 2011	Digital download	Big Dada
United Kingdom	30 May 2011	Digital download – EP	Big Dada
