= My Mistakes (Wiley song) =

Single by Wiley featuring Manga and Little Dee

from the album Playtime Is Over
- Released: 6 April 2007 (UK)
- Genre: Grime
- Length: 2:49 (Radio edit)
- Label: Big Dada
- Songwriter(s): Richard Cowie
- Producer(s): Bless Beats

Wiley singles chronology
"Pies" (2004)	"My Mistakes" (2007)	"Wearing My Rolex" (2008)

"My Mistakes" is a song by UK grime artist Wiley, featuring guest vocals from Manga and Little Dee. It was released as the second single from his third studio album, Playtime Is Over, on 6 April 2007.

== Music video ==
Wiley is in front of a tower rapping. There are two big screens and you can see Wiley rapping. Wiley is on a PSP rapping. There are his gang friends with him at the end.

== Track listings ==
Digital download

1. "My Mistakes" - 2:49

== Credits and personnel ==
- Lead vocals – Wiley, Little Dee, Manga
- Producer – Bless Beats
- Lyrics – Richard Cowie, Little Dee, Manga
- Label: Big Dada

== Release history ==
Country	Date	Format	Label
United Kingdom	6 April 2007	Digital download	Big Dada
