= All We Are (disambiguation) =

"All We Are" is a 1987 song by Warlock.

All We Are may also refer to:

- All We Are (album), by O.R.B., 2014
- "All We Are", a song by Björk and Dirty Projectors from Mount Wittenberg Orca, 2010
- "All We Are", a song by Fischerspooner from Odyssey, 2005
- "All We Are", a song by Gotthard from Lipservice, 2005
- "All We Are", a song by Kim Mitchell from Akimbo Alogo, 1984
- "All We Are", a song by OneRepublic from Dreaming Out Loud, 2007
