= Chris Haze =

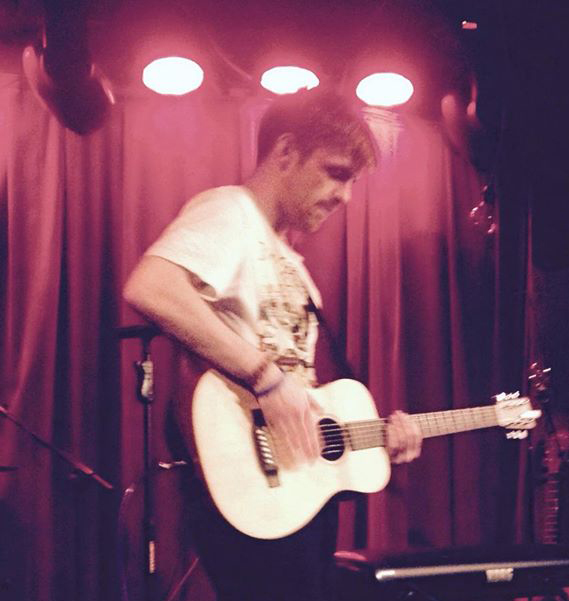
- Chris Haze live in the Roisin Dubh Galway

Background information
- Born: Christopher Francis Hayes "Haze"; 21 June 1990 (age 36)
- Origin: Galway, Ireland
- Genres: Pop; acoustic; folk
- Years active: 2010–present
- Website: www.chrishazemusic.com

Chris Haze (born 21 June 1990) is an Irish singer-songwriter, musician and producer. He was born in Galway, Ireland.

He began playing the guitar in 2010 and soon after began writing and releasing his own songs. Haze has toured Ireland with the Original Rudeboys and has supported international hip hop acts like Coolio.

== Early life ==
Haze grew up in Ballinfolye County Galway. With three brothers and a sister, he is the youngest of his family. His father was not around from a young age. His family moved to Westport, County Mayo when he was a child, and he spent a number of years there before returning to Galway when he started secondary school. Haze went to school in St Joseph's College (The Bish) in Galway City. He went on to get his Junior Certificate before leaving school at the age of 16.His signature look is sunglasses on a rainy day.

== Music career ==
=== 2010–2015: Career beginnings ===
In 2011, when he was 20, Haze was living in a house with friends who used to play and produce music. Inspired, he started watching YouTube videos to learn some guitar chords. He progressed quickly and soon began making his own songs. Haze recorded his first ever guitar riff and lyrics in 2012. This developed into his first song, which he called "World Outside". The song featured an English hip hop artist named Lexeeeee. "World Outside" received positive feedback from music critics and thousands of views on YouTube, which inspired Haze to pursue music as a career.

In 2013, Haze was nominated by Hot Press magazine on their list of "Hot for 2014". He was nominated again for their readers' poll award as Most Promising Artist of that year.

Since 2014, Haze has performed with a number of major names in the music industry. He has opened for international artists such as Coolio and Sheppard, and toured Ireland with the Irish group The Original Rudeboys, ending in December 2013, where Haze opened their sold-out shows at The Olympia Theatre and The Academy Dublin.

In 2014, Guinness picked Haze to participate in The Guinness Amplify Series, which spotlights and publicises new and upcoming Irish singer-songwriters.

=== 2015–2016: Singles and international airplay ===
In 2015, Haze released the single "Don't Wanna Fall Asleep", which generated media interest and radio play across Ireland. He followed with the release of his first EP, titled Thoughts to Words. The EP features "Don't Wanna Fall Asleep" and two other tracks.

Earlier in 2016, Haze released "Let Us Be Heroes", followed by a video for the song. The single received national airplay on RTE 2FM and in the United Kingdom on BBC Radio and Radio X.

Haze's single "I'll Run", released July 2016, also earned airplay on Irish, British and other European radio stations like KX Radio in the Netherlands. The official music video received similar accolades.

=== 2016–2017: We Are One – EP release ===
Following the singles "Let Us Be Heroes" and "I'll Run", Haze released an EP called We Are One on 17 February 2017, along with a self-titled single and official video. The EP featured "Let Us Be Heroes" and "I'll Run" along with three new songs. After the first week of sales We Are One came in at number 31 on the IRMA Official Irish Albums chart and at number 2 on the Official Irish Independent Album Chart. We Are One debuted at Number 1 on the Irish singer-songwriter chart and came in at Number 4 on the Official Irish Album Charts on the day of the release (17 February 2017) making this Haze's first official top 5 album and first Irish Number 1 release across various Google and iTunes charts.

=== 2017: "Say Goodbye" – single release ===
Later in 2017, Haze announced the release of yet another single called "Say Goodbye" which came out on 8 September to mark the one year anniversary of his single "I'll Run". "Say Goodbye" debuted at Number 1 on the Irish Singer-songwriter Chart and at Number 39 on the Official Irish Singles Charts. This was Haze's third Irish Chart appearance in 12 months independently and secured him his first Irish Number 1 and Top 40 Single. "Say Goodbye" went on to be the eighth most played Irish song on Irish radio the week of the release. "Say Goodbye" also secured Haze his first two appearances on two official Spotify playlists, a "New Music" playlist and a "New Talent" playlist.

=== 2018: RECIPE – single and EP release ===
In early 2018, Haze used social media to announce the release of a five-song EP entitled RECIPE, which features the single "Say Goodbye". The "RECIPE" EP debuted at Number 5 on the Official Irish Album Charts and at Number 2 on the Irish Singer-Songwriter Chart on iTunes as well as reaching Number 7 on the Top Albums Charts, Number 2 on the Singer-Songwriter Chart and Number 1 on the Folk Chart on Google Play Music. This was Haze's second appearance on the Top 10 Official Irish Album Charts in 24 months among numerous other chart positions across a number of different genres.

=== 2019: Chasing Rivers – singles and EP release ===
After his first North American tour in Sep/Oct 2018, Haze arrived home to announce the release of a new six-song EP entitled Chasing Rivers which was released 26 April. In the lead up to the release, he released the first single, "Chasing Rivers" on 22 February; it went on to peak at Number 11 on the Official Irish Singles Chart. The second single released from the EP released in March, entitled "So Long", secured another Top 100 Official Irish Single debut at Number 74. The EP was released on 26 April, debuted at Number 11 on the Official Irish Album Charts and secured numerous Top 5 positions across a number of Google Play music charts. The Chasing Rivers EP stayed in the Top 10 for over six weeks after its release, making it the longest Haze has spent in the Top 10 of any chart.

=== 2019–2020: Time and Space - single and EP ===
In 2019, Haze set his sights on establishing his own independent record label, Remody Records. It was a change over and rebranding of his initial record label, Chris Haze Music. He then announced the first body of work to be released on his own label, the Time and Space EP.

=== 2020–2021: Debut album release of Streets In My Mind, "WDGAF" and "The Power of Love" cover ===
After taking to TikTok during the pandemic in 2021, Haze secured a whole new fanbase which led to him releasing his debut album, Streets In My Mind. He then went on to release a controversial single entitled "WDGAF" which went on to secure Haze his first Official Irish Homegrown Top 20 on the Official Charts. The Irish artist and producer didn't stop there. Haze went on to release an official adaptation of the famous hit "The Power of Love" by Frankie Goes to Hollywood.

=== 2021–2022: Accepted into the Recording Academy ===
Haze was accepted as a member of The Recording Academy as a voting member.

== Discography ==
=== Extended plays ===
Title	Details	Peak chart position
Title	Details	IRL
Thoughts to Words – EP	Released: 16 March 2015	—
On the Road – EP	Released: 1 June 2015	—
We Are One – EP	Released: 17 February 2017	1
Recipe – EP	Released: 23 March 2018	1
Chasing Rivers – EP	Released: 26 April 2019	17
Streets In My Mind	Released 19 March 2021	--

=== Singles ===
Year	Title	Peak chart position	Album
Year	Title	IRL	Album
2013	"Over and Over"	—	World Outside
2015	"Let Us Be Heroes"	—	We Are One – EP
2016	"I'll Run"	3	We Are One – EP
2017	"We Are One"	—	We Are One – EP
2017	"Fall for Love"	—	We Are One – EP
2017	"Say Goodbye"	—	Recipe – EP
2018	"Recipe"		Recipe – EP
2019	"Chasing Rivers"	11	Chasing Rivers – EP
2019	"So Long"	74	Chasing Rivers – EP
2021	'WDGAF'	17	N/A
