= Travelling Man (song) =

Single by Irish trio The Original Rudeboys

Single by The Original Rudeboys

from the album This Life
- Released: 9 March 2012
- Recorded: 2012
- Genre: Acoustic, indie, hip hop
- Length: 3:27
- Label: Gotta Run Records
- Songwriter(s): Sean "Neddy" Arkins; Robert Burch; Sean "Walshy" Walsh

The Original Rudeboys singles chronology
"Stars in My Eyes" (2011)	"Travelling Man" (2012)	"Written Songs" (2012)

"Travelling Man" is the second single by Irish trio the Original Rudeboys from the album This Life. The song was released as a single on 9 March 2012 on an EP, through Gotta Run Records.

== Track listing ==
- Travelling Man EP
1. "Travelling Man" (Radio version) - 3:27
2. "Travelling Man" (A to B Remix) - 4:39
3. "Feel the Same" - 3:16
4. "The Last Goodbye" - 2:43

== Chart ==
Chart (2012)	Peak position
Ireland (IRMA)	23
