= Wot Do U Call It? =

Single by Wiley

from the album Treddin' on Thin Ice
- Released: 5 April 2004 (UK)
- Recorded: 2003
- Genre: Grime; eskibeat
- Length: 3:20 (radio edit)
- Label: XL
- Songwriter: Richard Cowie
- Producer: Wiley

Wiley singles chronology
"Wot Do U Call It?" (2004)	"Pies" (2004)

"Wot Do U Call It?" is the debut single by British grime artist Wiley, released on 5 April 2004 as the lead single from his debut album Treddin' on Thin Ice (2004). It is a vocal version of the instrumental song "Igloo", which he also produced.

The song addresses the debate around the name of the then-emerging grime genre, which some commentators considered a derivative "grimy" form of UK garage and others such as DJ EZ had branded "grime" for short, while Wiley himself had been using the term "eskibeat" for his music. Dan Hancox has described how Wiley "speculates derisively" about the correct name for the sound in the song's lyrics "without providing a definitive answer", referencing the options "garage", "urban" and "2-step". Writing for NME in 2012, Kieran Yates described the song as a "seminal single" which "helped define the genre".

A short documentary of the same name, directed by Adam Smith and produced by Raw TV for XL Recordings, aired on Channel 4 in 2004 and included interviews with Roll Deep, Terror Danjah and Nasty Crew's Stormin and Ghetts among others, discussing how they described the style of music they made.

== Music video ==
The music video, directed by Adam Smith, was shot in various locations including the record shop Rhythm Division on Roman Road, pirate radio stations and raves.

== Track listings ==
CD single

1. "Wot Do U Call It?" – 3:20
2. "Problems" – 3:49

Digital download – EP

1. "Wot Do U Call It?"
2. "Wot Do U Call It?" (instrumental)

== Credits and personnel ==
- Lead vocals – Wiley
- Producer – Wiley
- Lyrics – Richard Cowie
- Label: XL Recordings

== Chart performance ==
Chart (2004)	Peak position
UK Singles (OCC)	31
UK Indie (OCC)	2

== Release history ==
Country	Date	Format	Label
United Kingdom	5 April 2004	Vinyl; digital download; CD single	XL
