= Take That (Wiley song) =

Single by Wiley & Chew Fu
- Released: 28 December 2009 (UK)
- Genre: Electro house
- Length: 2:45 (radio edit); 5:42 (extended version)
- Label: Island
- Songwriter(s): Richard Cowie
- Producer(s): Chew Fu

Wiley singles chronology
| "Cash in My Pocket" (2008) | "Take That" (2009) | "Sidetracked" (2010) |

"Take That" is a 2009 single from British grime artist Wiley & Dutch producer Chew Fu. It was released on 28 December 2009.

== Track listings ==
=== iTunes tracks ===
1. "Take That" (Radio Edit) – 2:45
2. "Take That" (Extended Mix) – 5:42
3. "Take That" (Doorly Remix) – 5:45
4. "Take That" (Doorly Dubstep Mix) – 4:09
5. "Take That" (BBK vs. Roll Deep vs. Fire Camp Remix) – 4:47
6. "Take That" (Sketch Iz Dead Remix) – 4:06

== Chart performance ==
Following a release in late December 2009, "Take That" first entered the UK Singles Chart on 3 January 2010, where it charted at #22. The following week, on 10 January 2010, "Take That" rose by 2 places, to reach its peak of #20. As of 4 January 2011 the single has sold 70,000 units in the UK.

| Chart (2010) | Peak Position |
|---|---|
| Scotland (OCC) | 28 |
| UK Dance (OCC) | 2 |
| UK Singles (OCC) | 20 |
