= Boom Blast =

Single by Wiley

from the album Evolve Or Be Extinct
- Released: 16 January 2012 (UK)
- Genre: Grime; eskibeat
- Length: 3:34 (Radio edit)
- Label: Big Dada
- Songwriter: Richard Cowie
- Producer: Most Wanted Mega

Wiley singles chronology
"If I Could" (2011)	"Boom Blast" (2012)	"Heatwave" (2012)

"Boom Blast" is a single from British grime artist Wiley. It is the second single released from his eighth album Evolve Or Be Extinct (2012). It was released on 16 January 2012 for digital download.

== Music video ==
The music video was uploaded to YouTube on 9 January 2012.

== Track listings ==
- Digital download
1. "Boom Blast" (Radio Edit) – 3:34
- Digital download – EP
1. "Boom Blast" – 3:34
2. "Boom Blast" (Sticky Remix) – 3:49
3. "Boom Blast" (Herner Werzog Remix) – 4:01
4. "Boom Blast" (Alex D Remix) – 4:52
5. "Boom Blast" (Sticky Instrumental Remix) – 3:49
6. "Boom Blast" (Instrumental) – 3:34

== Credits and personnel ==
- Lead vocals – Wiley
- Producer – Wiley
- Lyrics – Richard Cowie
- Label: Big Dada

== Chart performance ==
Chart (2012)	Peak position
UK Indie (OCC)	9

== Release history ==
Country	Date	Format	Label
United Kingdom	16 January 2012	Digital download	Big Dada
United Kingdom	17 January 2012	Digital download – EP	Big Dada
