= Playtime Is Over (Wiley album) =

Studio album by Wiley
- Released: 4 June 2007
- Genre: Grime; eskibeat
- Length: 51:28
- Label: Big Dada
- Producer: Wiley, Maniac, Most Wanted Productions, Bless Beats, Skepta, Decoy, Geeneus, DVA

Wiley chronology
Da 2nd Phaze (2006)	Playtime Is Over (2007)	Grime Wave (2008)

Singles from Playtime Is Over
- 1. "50/50" Released: 30 May 2007; 2. "My Mistakes" Released: 2 July 2007

Professional ratings
Aggregate scores
Source	Rating
Metacritic	71/100
Review scores
Source	Rating
AllMusic	4/5 stars
Evening Standard	5/5 stars
musicOMH	3/5 stars
NME	8/10
Pitchfork	6.9/10
Playlouder	4.5/5 stars
PopMatters	5/10
Spin	6/10
Stylus	B
Tom Hull – on the Web	B+

Playtime Is Over is the third studio album by English grime artist Wiley. It was released on Big Dada Recordings and was recorded in Bow, East London. The album was released on 4 June 2007, the same day as former protégée Dizzee Rascal's Maths + English, and reached 71 in the UK Album Chart. Playtime Is Over was the featured album on MySpace the week before its release.

It was apparently planned for release in the U.S. on 11 September 2007. On this album, Wiley also addresses a feud between himself and Dizzee Rascal with the song "Letter 2 Dizzee". Dizzee later replied with the song "Pussyole", which featured on his album Maths + English. "No Qualms", which samples Jme's 2006 song "Poomplex", is a response to Nasty Jack's "Pimp on Flows" diss track.

== Track listing ==
No.	Title	Producer(s)	Length
1.	"50/50"	Wiley	2:18
2.	"Bow E3"	Maniac	3:01
3.	"Slippin"	Wiley	3:39
4.	"Flyboy" (featuring Mercston, Scorcher and Tinie Tempah)	Wiley	2:29
5.	"Baby Girl"	Wiley	2:42
6.	"Gangsters"	Wiley	3:13
7.	"Stars" (featuring Jookie Mundo)	Wiley	3:04
8.	"Letter 2 Dizzee"	Most Wanted Productions	2:31
9.	"My Mistakes" (featuring Manga and Little Dee)	Bless Beats	2:49
10.	"No Qualms" (featuring Jme)	Skepta	2:34
11.	"Johnny Was a Bad Boy"	Decoy & Wiley	3:27
12.	"Nothing About Me"	Geeneus	3:40
13.	"Come Lay With Me"	DVA	3:39
14.	"Getalong Gang"	Wiley	2:52
15.	"Eski-Boy"	Wiley	2:46
16.	"Playtime's Over / Where's Wiley?"	Wiley	6:44
Total length:			51:28

== Charts ==
Chart (2007)	Peak position
UK Albums Chart	71
