= This Life (The Original Rudeboys album) =

Studio album by the Original Rudeboys
- Released: 23 March 2012 (Ireland)
- Recorded: 2011–2012 in Surrey, England
- Genre: Acoustic; hip hop; pop
- Length: 36:31
- Label: Gotta Run Records
- Producer: Jake Gosling

The Original Rudeboys chronology
This Life (2012)	All We Are (2014)

Singles from This Life
- 1. "Stars in My Eyes" Released: 14 October 2011; 2. "Travelling Man" Released: 9 March 2012; 3. "Written Songs" Released: 20 July 2012; 4. "Blue Eyes" Released: 9 November 2012

This Life is the debut album by Irish acoustic hip-hop group the Original Rudeboys (now O.R.B.), released on 23 March 2012 in Ireland and 12 April 2012 in the UK through Gotta Run Records. It came in at number 1 on The Independent Charts and number 3 on the Irish Album Chart. It has been certified Multi Platinum in Ireland by the IRMA. It was met with generally mixed reviews from music critics.

The album was recorded in the UK with Jake Gosling, best known for producing Ed Sheeran's multi-platinum debut album.

The first single, "Stars in My Eyes", was released on 14 October 2011 and peaked at No. 18 on the Irish Singles Chart. The second single, "Travelling Man", released on 9 March 2012 was met with similar success and peaked at No. 23 on the Irish Singles Chart. The third single, Written songs was released 20 June 2012 and mirrored the success of the first two singles by reaching No. 39 on the Irish Singles Chart. The fourth and final single, "Blue Eyes", was released 9 November 2012 after being re-recorded and remixed by Ash Howes who has previously worked with The Saturdays, One Direction and Ellie Goulding.

== Reception ==
Critical opinion for This Life was mixed. Jackie Hayden of Hot Press called it "passionate rap with an Irish passport" and praised the contrast between the two vocalists. Niall Swan of Irish music website "Golden Plec" said "Burch's vocals are reminiscent of Jason Mraz or Jack Johnson in their prime and it is the contrast between the accents of the two vocalists which make The Original Rudeboys be exactly what they claim to be, original." While The Irish Times critisied the blending of Burch and Arkins vocals stating they created "odd Frankensteins of songs". John Meagher of the Irish Independent was also critical of the two vocalists calling Burchs' voice "bland" and stating Arkins' "Dublinese rapping" would not have any impact internationally.

== Track listing ==
All tracks are written by Sean "Neddy" Arkins, Robert Burch, Sean Walsh

This Life track listing
No.	Title	Length
1.	"Stars in My Eyes"	2:59
2.	"Travelling Man" (co-written with Jake Gosling)	3:43
3.	"Sunny Days"	3:47
4.	"Me and My Mind"	3:59
5.	"Live Your Life"	3:55
6.	"Bringing Me Down"	2:58
7.	"Blue Eyes"	3:57
8.	"Complicated"	3:52
9.	"In Too Deep"	3:18
10.	"Written Songs"	4:10

Deluxe version bonus track
No.	Title	Length
11.	"Feel The Same"	3:16
12.	"Dublin Days"	4:11

== Charts ==
Chart performance for This Life
Chart (2012)	Peak position
Irish Albums (IRMA)	3
Irish Independent Albums Chart	1
