= Grime Wave =

Studio album by Wiley
- Released: 26 May 2008
- Genre: Grime; eskibeat
- Length: 38:53
- Label: Eskibeat Recordings
- Producer: Wiley, Bless Beats, Maniac, D-Minus

Wiley chronology
Playtime Is Over (2007)	Grime Wave (2008)	See Clear Now (2008)

Professional ratings
Review scores
Source	Rating
The Times	3/5 stars
RWD	3/5 stars

Grime Wave is the fourth album by English grime artist Wiley. The album was released on 26 May 2008 by Eskibeat Recordings.

== Track listing ==
No.	Title	Producer(s)	Length
1.	"Grime Wave" (featuring Messy & Desperado)	Bless Beats	2:38
2.	"Local Lad"	Bless Beats	2:50
3.	"If You're Going Out I'm Going Out Too" (featuring Blaze & Triggz)	Wiley	3:20
4.	"Grime Kid"	Maniac	3:25
5.	"It's a Par" (featuring Tinchy Stryder, Messy & Flow Dan)	Wiley	3:21
6.	"Badman Talking" (featuring Flo Dan)	Wiley	3:27
7.	"Where You Gonna Run Too?"	Wiley	3:26
8.	"Anything Is Possible" (featuring Frisco & Cookie)	Bless Beats	3:16
9.	"Living in London" (featuring Tinchy Stryder & Messy)	Bless Beats	3:12
10.	"Fire Ain't Burning No More"	Wiley	3:05
11.	"Sky Is Falling"	D-Minus	3:10
12.	"It's Only Right" (featuring Flo Dan & Brazen)	Wiley	3:43
Total length:			38:53
