= Written Songs =

Single by The Original Rudeboys

from the album This Life
- Released: 20 July 2012
- Genre: Pop, hip hop, R&B
- Length: 3:36
- Label: Gotta Run Records
- Songwriter(s): Sean "Neddy" Arkins, Robert Burch, Sean Walsh
- Producer(s): Jake Gosling

The Original Rudeboys singles chronology
"Travelling Man" (2012)	"Written Songs" (2012)	"Blue Eyes" (2012)

"Written Songs" is the third single from Irish trio The Original Rudeboys. It was produced by Jake Gosling and reworked from the album This Life by Ash Howes. The song was released as a single on 20 July 2012 on an EP entitled Written Songs (Feeling Good), through Gotta Run Records.

== Track listing ==
- Written Songs (Feeling Good) EP
1. "Written Songs (Feeling Good)" - 3:36
2. "Dublin Days" - 4:11
3. "Sunny Days" (Feat. FemFel)- 3:29
4. "Crazy" - 3:49

== Charts ==
Chart (2012)	Peak position
Irish Singles Chart	39

== Critical reception ==
The song was generally well received. Hot Press called it "a feel-good, catchy summer tune". Vicky Gottschalk of popular Irish music website iammusic stated "The Original Rudeboys are onto a winner with their fresh sound and unique take on the music industry."
