= Cash in My Pocket =

Single by Wiley featuring Daniel Merriweather

from the album See Clear Now
- Released: 1 December 2008 (UK)
- Genre: Pop-rap
- Length: 3:00 (radio edit)
- Label: Asylum; Warner Music
- Songwriters: Richard Cowie; Mark Ronson; Daniel Merriweather
- Producer: Mark Ronson

Wiley singles chronology
| "Summertime" (2008) | "Cash in My Pocket" (2008) | "Take That" (2009) |

Daniel Merriweather singles chronology
| "Stop Me" (2007) | "Cash in My Pocket" (2008) | "Change" (2008) |

"Cash in My Pocket" is a 2008 single from British grime artist Wiley, which features guest vocals from Daniel Merriweather and was produced by Mark Ronson.

Wiley would later disown See Clear Now and this song for being too commercial. Wiley blamed his record label Asylum Records and manager John Woolf for making him release the record. Sometime after the song was released, Wiley said he was going on holiday until the song had "done its course" and that once he comes back, nobody should ever say "I love that Cash in My Pocket Tune" to him.

== Reviews ==
Clickmusic.com gave the song 2 stars out of 5 but gave it some praise by saying "Releasing a song entitled Cash in My Pocket during a full blown credit crunch is timing par excellence" but went on to say that "a bored sounding Merriweather delivers his perfunctory contribution with nothing of the soul that we have come to expect".

Yahoo Music gave the song 8 stars out of 10, they had this to say about Wiley, "delivers his lines with a twinkle in his eye", they then went on to say this about the chorus which was sung by Daniel Merriweather, "while the chorus could be lifted from a West End musical", they then finished the review by saying, "This is contemporary pop working at full speed".

Femalefirst.co.uk gave the song 4 stars out of 5, because it lets the viewers vote and that is the average as of 3 January 2008, they praised the song by saying that it is, "Entering ground-breaking new musical territory", they also talked about the credit crunch when they said "Wiley has read the mood of a nation hit by the global economic crises and has come up with an ode to the credit crunch of sorts".

== Competition ==
Glasswerk.co.uk made a competition where people could make their own video for the song with their classmates or colleagues and get "£1000 worth of XmasCa$h in Your Pocket", they also called the song "the official credit crunch theme tune".

== Music video ==
The video is like the video for "Wearing My Rolex" in the aspect that it does not feature Wiley or Daniel Merriweather: it has the people featured in the video miming the lyrics. It starts off with people going to work in their car in the financial district of Bishopsgate, in the City of London, while the rest of the music video is set in one of the offices in the Blue Fin Building in Southwark, London (located at 110 Southwark Street, post code SE1 0SU, directly behind the Tate Modern). The office is the UK Headquarters of Donovan Data Systems (DDS), a "leading systems and software provider to the advertising industry", and the video features the people who work there.

One can see pictures on the London Eye on the glass walls in the music video. It then ends with everyone who works there singing the last lines of the song.

== Chart performance ==
The song debut on the UK Singles Chart at 18, making it Wiley's second biggest hit since his 2008 number 2 hit "Wearing My Rolex" and Daniel's second biggest hit since his number 2 collaboration with Mark Ronson entitled "Stop Me", on this week it was the third biggest new entry of the week behind Oasis "I'm Outta Time" (12) and Leona Lewis "Run" (1). The following week the song dropped one place to number 19, James Morrison and Nelly Furtado's new single "Broken Strings" took number 18 from Wiley and Merriweather. The next week it dropped nine places to 28, the following week it dropped thirteen places in the chart to 41, this was its first week outside of the top 40.

The video is set on a trading floor in what is to be the Swiss Re building (Gherkin Building). This can be clearly seen when the car initially pulled up outside and the camera pans upwards.

| Chart (2008) | Peak Position |
|---|---|
| UK Singles Chart | 18 |
