= 100% Publishing =

Studio album by Wiley
- Released: 20 June 2011
- Genre: Grime; eskibeat
- Length: 47:10
- Label: Big Dada
- Producer: Wiley

Wiley chronology
Race Against Time (2009)	100% Publishing (2011)	Chill Out Zone (2011)

Singles from 100% Publishing
- 1. "Numbers in Action" Released: 5 April 2011

100% Publishing is the seventh studio album by English grime artist Wiley. It is named "100% Publishing" because the album was written, produced and mastered in its entirety by Wiley while working independently of a label. Big Dada re-signed Wiley to release the album and was released on 20 June 2011. The first single, "Numbers in Action", was released on 5 April 2011.

== Critical reception ==
Professional ratings
Aggregate scores
Source	Rating
AnyDecentMusic?	6.6/10
Metacritic	67/100
Review scores
Source	Rating
AllMusic	3.5/5 stars
Clash	8/10
Drowned in Sound	7/10
The Guardian	4/5 stars
MusicOMH	4/5 stars
NME	3.5/5 stars
Pitchfork	7.5/10
PopMatters	6/10
The Skinny	3/5 stars
Tom Hull – on the Web	B+

100% Publishing was met with "generally favorable" reviews from critics. At Metacritic, which assigns a weighted average rating out of 100 to reviews from mainstream publications, this release received an average score of 67 based on 20 reviews. Aggregator website AnyDecentMusic? gave a 6.6 out of 10 based on a critical consensus of 22 reviews.

In a review for Pitchfork, Nate Patrin wrote: "100% Publishing bristles with the reflexive jabs and on-the-spot opinions that tend to come during long-distance sparring sessions with the nebulous flogging masses. Wiley wasn't always the slickest-flowing rapper, but if there's one part of his game that's really stepped up, it's his relationship with his own beats." Alex Macpherson of The Guardian noted the albums "beats are sparse, functional and judiciously melodic in ways that will be recognisable to fans of his original eski sound. More importantly, this strategy puts Wiley's voice and personality front and centre." At Clash, Raj Chaudhari noted "the album is a fine document of why Wiley was, is, and will continue to be such a cornerstone of the grime scene."

== Track listing ==
All songs written and produced by Wiley.

No.	Title	Producer(s)	Length
1.	"Information Age"	Wiley	1:37
2.	"100% Publishing"	Wiley	2:59
3.	"Numbers in Action"	Wiley	3:23
4.	"Boom Boom Da Na"	Wiley	3:14
5.	"Your Intuition"	Wiley	2:46
6.	"I Just Woke Up"	Wiley	2:46
7.	"Wise Man and His Words"	Wiley	3:00
8.	"Talk About Life" (featuring Daniel de Bourg)	Wiley	3:28
9.	"Yonge Street (1,178 Miles Long)"	Wiley	2:59
10.	"Pink Lady"	Wiley	3:48
11.	"Up There"	Wiley	3:30
12.	"One Hit Wonder"	Wiley	3:36
13.	"To Be Continued"	Wiley	3:19
Total length:			40:20

CD bonus track
No.	Title	Producer(s)	Length
14.	"Music, Not the Money" (featuring Leah Miller)	Wiley	3:25
Total length:			43:45

ITunes Store & Ninja Tune bonus track
No.	Title	Producer(s)	Length
14.	"Chill"	Wiley	3:35
Total length:			47:10

== Charts ==
Chart (2011)	Peak position
UK Albums Chart	76
UK R&B Albums Chart	10
UK Indie Chart	12
