= Evolve or Be Extinct =

Studio album by Wiley
- Released: 19 January 2012
- Recorded: 2010–2011
- Genre: Grime; eskibeat
- Length: 70:45
- Label: Big Dada; BDDNL187
- Producer: Wiley, Nana Rogues, Mark Pritchard, Most Wanted Mega

Wiley chronology
Chill Out Zone (2011)	Evolve or Be Extinct (2012)	The Ascent (2013)

Singles from Evolve Or Be Extinct
- 1. "Link Up" Released: 25 July 2011; 2. "Boom Blast" Released: 16 January 2012; 3. "Only Human" Released: 12 April 2012; 4. "Evolve Or Be Extinct" Released: 14 April 2012

Evolve or Be Extinct is the eighth studio album by English grime artist Wiley. The album was released on 19 January 2012 as a double-disc album. Two singles were released from the album, "Link Up" and "Boom Blast". The album entered the UK Albums Chart at number 97 on 22 January 2012, then climbed up to number 86 in the UK Charts in its second week. Upon discussing the album, Wiley said: "I came to a point in my life where I realized that [I had] to actually evolve and I was just trying to put myself to the test, and make a real album that I would make. I used to do things and not finish them. This time around I actually did concentration from the start. If something wasn't right, I went back and I said, 'Wiley, this isn’t right.' Not to say on the other [albums] I didn’t work hard, but it’s just that this time I actually did concentrate, and it’s probably the first time I ever have."

== Critical reception ==
Professional ratings
Aggregate scores
Source	Rating
Metacritic	73/100
Review scores
Source	Rating
The Guardian	4/5 stars
Pitchfork	(7.2/10)
RWD Magazine	3/5 stars

Upon release, Evolve Or Be Extinct has received fairly positive feedback from the public and critics. Ash Houghton of SB.TV rounded up his review with: "All in all, Evolve Or Be Extinct is another strong piece of work from one of the most prolific, multi-talented artists the UK has to offer. Wiley consistently provides a body of work which encompasses his input on all levels, from production to vocals; his name is strewn throughout the album’s credits which, in turn, ensures nothing but the purest sound grime has to offer." Noel Gardner of BBC gave a satisfying review, saying: "A haphazard, sometimes ridiculous, but often impressively inventive new set. In fact, this feels like an album by, for and about himself. Most lyrics unapologetically address the life of Wiley; two baffling skits, in which he quarrels with a taxi driver and customs officer respectively, seem to play up to his hothead reputation. Evolve or Be Extinct will appeal largely to people already well aware of it, and who are looking for a full-length to rival his 2004 debut Treddin' on Thin Ice. This should go some way to satisfying them." Riky Bains of RWD Magazine gave Evolve of Be Extinct a positive review stating: "Wiley is moving in a new direction and throwing new sounds and innovative ideas at a tough audience; just like Charles Darwin. His work wasn’t fully accepted or appreciated till a decade later. Is this album ahead of its time?"

== Track listing ==
All tracks are written by Richard Kylea Cowie.

No.	Title	Producer(s)	Length
1.	"Welcome to Zion"	Wiley	2:46
2.	"Evolve or Be Extinct"	Wiley	3:08
3.	"Link Up"	Nana Rogues	3:04
4.	"Boom Blast"	Most Wanted Mega	3:34
5.	"I'm Skanking"	Wiley	3:08
6.	"Weirdo"	Rymez	3:32
7.	"Scar"	Mark Pritchard	3:04
8.	"Can I Have a Taxi Please?"	Wiley	2:55
9.	"Miss You"	Wiley	2:54
10.	"Money Man"	Mark Pritchard	4:07
11.	"Customs"	Wiley	3:58
12.	"Immigration"	Wiley	2:59
13.	"Only Human" (featuring Cashtastic & Tereza Delzz)	Steel Banglez	3:48
14.	"This Is Just an Album"	Wiley	3:12

Disc 2
No.	Title	Producer(s)	Length
15.	"Ya Win Some, Ya Lose Some"	Most Wanted Mega	2:56
16.	"Fire"	Wiley	3:10
17.	"No Love Lost"	Wiley	3:17
18.	"Cheer Up, It's Christmas"	Jay Weathers	2:50
19.	"Life at Sea"	Wiley	3:12
20.	"Daiquiris"	Wiley	3:01
21.	"Confused" (featuring Manga)	Wiley	3:25
22.	"Highs and Lows"	Wiley	2:45
Total length:			70:45

== Charts ==
Chart (2012)	Peak position
UK Albums Chart	86
UK R&B Chart	13
UK Indie Chart	11

== Release history ==
Region	Date	Format	Label
United Kingdom	19 January 2012	Digital download	Big Dada
United States	19 January 2012	Digital download	Big Dada
