= Summertime (Wiley song) =

Single by Wiley

from the album See Clear Now
- Released: 13 October 2008 (UK)
- Genre: Electro-funk
- Length: 3:21
- Label: Asylum; Warner
- Songwriter(s): Richard Cowie; Thomas Bangalter (uncredited); Guy-Manuel de Homem-Christo (uncredited)
- Producer(s): Jake Gosling; Sam Young

Wiley singles chronology
"Wearing My Rolex" (2008)	"Summertime" (2008)	"Cash in My Pocket" (2008)

"Summertime" is a song by British grime artist Wiley. It was released on 13 October 2008 and samples the 2001 instrumental "Aerodynamic" by French electronic music duo Daft Punk.

== Music video ==
The video starts with Wiley on many different video screens, and features Wiley and female dancers against many different backgrounds. The video later involves Wiley performing the song at a gig with dancers, a segment involving him going into the crowd. Unlike the other two videos from the See Clear Now album, the "Summertime" video features Wiley on screen.

== Chart performance ==
Chart (2008)	Peak position
UK Hip Hop/R&B (OCC)	3
UK Singles (OCC)	45
