= Treddin' on Thin Ice =

Studio album by Wiley
- Released: 26 April 2004
- Genre: Grime; eskibeat
- Length: 46:56
- Label: XL Recordings
- Producer: Wiley; TNT; Target; Danny Weed; Cage

Wiley chronology
Treddin' on Thin Ice (2004)	Da 2nd Phaze (2006)

Singles from Treddin' on Thin Ice
- 1. "Wot Do U Call It?" Released: 5 April 2004; 2. "Pies" Released: 2004

Professional ratings
Review scores
Source	Rating
AllMusic	4/5 stars
The Guardian	4/5 stars
Pitchfork Media	7.6/10
The Village Voice	(choice cut)

Treddin' on Thin Ice is the debut album by UK grime artist Wiley released on XL Recordings. It was released on 26 April 2004.

The album is seen as a critical success in grime music with an enduring and influential forward facing sound. However, commercially the album did not do as well, with one single ("Wot Do U Call It", a song addressing the debate over the categorization of grime) making the top 40 in the UK music charts.

== Track listing ==
No.	Title	Producer(s)	Length
1.	"The Game"	TNT	3:09
2.	"Pick U R Self Up" (featuring Breeze, J2K and Riko)	Target; Danny Weed	4:01
3.	"Wot Do U Call It?"	Wiley	3:19
4.	"Eskimo (Interlude)"	Wiley; Cage (add.)	0:56
5.	"Goin' Mad"	Wiley	3:38
6.	"Doorway"	Wiley	3:50
7.	"Special Girl" (featuring Kano)	Wiley; Cage (add.)	4:34
8.	"Avalanche (Interlude)"	Wiley	1:23
9.	"Reasons"	Wiley	4:08
10.	"Got Somebody"	Wiley	3:59
11.	"Pies"	Wiley	3:26
12.	"Ice-Rink (Interlude)"	Wiley	0:34
13.	"Next Level" (featuring J2K, Tinchy Stryder and Kano)	Wiley	3:21
14.	"Treddin' on Thin Ice"	Wiley	3:14
15.	"I Was Lost"	Wiley	3:24
Total length:			46:56
