= Da 2nd Phaze =

Studio album by Wiley
- Released: 1 July 2006
- Recorded: 2004–2006
- Genre: Grime; eskibeat
- Label: Boy Better Know
- Producer: Wiley, JME, Decoy, Rapid, Mizz Beats, Platinum 45

Wiley chronology
Treddin' On Thin Ice (2004)	Da 2nd Phaze (2006)	Playtime Is Over (2007)

Da 2nd Phaze is the second album by English grime MC Wiley. It was released on 1 July 2006 by Boy Better Know after his departure from XL Recordings. The tracks "Eskiboy", "Gangsterz", and "Johnny Was A Badboy" were released again on Wiley's third album Playtime Is Over in 2007.

== Track listing ==
No.	Title	Producer(s)	Length
1.	"Intro"	Wiley	1:44
2.	"Eskiboy"	Wiley	2:50
3.	"Gangsterz"	Wiley	3:15
4.	"U Ain't Real" (featuring Syer B & Brazen)	Wiley	3:43
5.	"Stormy Weather"	Wiley	2:37
6.	"Carry Out Orders" (featuring JME)	Wiley	2:02
7.	"I Like The Way"	JME	3:00
8.	"Be Yourself" (featuring Brazen & Dom P)	Wiley	2:56
9.	"Johnny Was A Badboy"	Decoy	3:27
10.	"Grim" (featuring JME & Ears)	JME	2:50
11.	"One Avalanche"	Wiley	3:50
12.	"Keep Moving" (featuring Donae'o & JME)	Wiley	3:53
13.	"Friday Night"	Rapid	2:44
14.	"Mystery Girl"	Wiley	3:07
15.	"Ice Pole Remix"	Wiley	4:03
16.	"Saw It Coming" (featuring Jammer, Ears, JME & Syer B)	Mizz Beats	4:22

Bonus Tracks
No.	Title	Producer(s)	Length
17.	"Gods Gift Freestyle" (Performed By Gods Gift)	---	1:31
18.	"Streets That We Live" (Performed By Alex Mills)	Wiley	4:45
19.	"So Amazing" (Performed By Wiley)	Wiley	3:05
20.	"Oi" (Performed By More Fire Crew)	Platinum 45	4:30
