= Chill Out Zone (EP) =

EP by Wiley
- Released: 12 July 2011
- Recorded: 2010–11; Various recording locations
- Genre: Grime; R&B
- Length: 35:09
- Label: Elusive Entertainment
- Producer: Wiley; Jay Weathers; Dan Dare

Wiley chronology
100% Publishing (2011)	Chill Out Zone (2011)	Evolve or Be Extinct (2012)

Singles from Chill Out Zone
- 1. "Seduction" Released: 1 May 2011; 2. "If I Could" Released: 15 May 2011

Chill Out Zone is an extended-play by UK grime artist Wiley, released independently on 12 July 2011 for free digital download. Two singles were released in preparation for the album: "Seduction" featuring Alexa Goddard and "If I Could" featuring Ed Sheeran.

== Background ==
On 8 March 2011, Wiley announced he would be working on a project with UK producer Jay Weathers in which he will release songs from him and Ed Sheeran, Alexa Goddard, Meleka, Sinead Harnett, Cherri V and Opium. During the production stages of the project, Wiley decided the songs were good enough to be compiled into an album, and in May 2011 he revealed the project had now turned into his next album, titled "Chill Out Zone" The album is the first to display Wiley's new genre which is a cross between R&B and grime called RnG (Rhythm n Grime) (pronounced: Riddim n Grime). On 8 July 2011, the album was released as a free download via his Twitter account.

== Track listing ==
No.	Title	Producer(s)	Length
1.	"Music Is Calling Me" (featuring Meleka)	Dan Dare	3:29
2.	"If I Could" (featuring Ed Sheeran)	Jay Weathers	3:07
3.	"Seduction" (featuring Alexa Goddard)	Jay Weathers	4:13
4.	"Walk Away" (featuring Sinead Harnett)	Jay Weathers	3:58
5.	"Don’t Throw It Away"	Jay Weathers; Blase	2:34
6.	"But I Did (We Clicked)"	Jay Weathers	2:39
7.	"Romeo" (featuring Cherri V)	Flava D	3:25
8.	"She Might Holla"	Wiley	2:57
9.	"Out the Box"	Jay Weathers	3:28
10.	"Get Up"	Wiley	3:41
11.	"Pengting" (featuring Opium)	Numan	1:36
Total length:			35:09
