= See Clear Now =

Studio album by Wiley
- Released: 10 November 2008
- Genre: Grime
- Length: 34:48
- Label: Asylum
- Producer: Mark Ronson, Wiley, DaVinChe, Bless Beats, Jake Gosling, Mathias Wollo, P-Nut, Curtis Foss, Hot Chip, Arthur Baker, Peter Raeburn, Nick Foster and Adam Bushell

Wiley chronology
Grime Wave (2008)	See Clear Now (2008)	Race Against Time (2009)

Singles from See Clear Now
- 1. "Wearing My Rolex" Released: 5 May 2008; 2. "Summertime" Released: 13 October 2008; 3. "Cash in My Pocket" Released: 1 December 2008

Professional ratings
Review scores
Source	Rating
PurelyHipHop	3.5/5 stars
The Guardian	3/5 stars

See Clear Now is the fifth studio album by English grime artist Wiley. The album was released on 10 November 2008. It was originally set to be released as I See Clear on 13 October 2008.

The album features collaborations with electropop group Hot Chip, and DJ/producer Mark Ronson in "Cash in My Pocket". The album's first single, "Wearing My Rolex" was succeeded by the single "Summertime" on 22 September and "Cash in My Pocket".

== Background ==
Wiley describes See Clear Now as "[his] first pop album", explaining that he wants to "push boundaries" while also "stay[ing] in the charts by making tunes that connect with people. It's pop all the way from here".

He adds that people should listen to Race Against Time (2009) instead because it isn't commercial and he would have more artistic control.

== Track listing ==
No.	Title	Producer(s)	Length
1.	"Ryder Intro"	DaVinChe	1:28
2.	"Wearing My Rolex"	Bless Beats	2:51
3.	"I Need to Be"	Jake Gosling	3:16
4.	"Summertime"	Jake Gosling	3:21
5.	"See Clear Now" (featuring Kano & Scorcher)	P*Nut, Mathias Wollo, Curtis Foss	3:20
6.	"Cash in My Pocket" (featuring Daniel Merriweather)	Mark Ronson	3:00
7.	"5am" (featuring Scorcher)	Jake Gosling	3:35
8.	"Step by Step" (featuring Hot Chip)	Hot Chip	3:48
9.	"Turn It Up"	Arthur Baker	3:29
10.	"Can't Stop Thinking"	Wiley, Jake Gosling	3:49
11.	"I Am the Sea"	Peter Raeburn, Nick Foster, Adam Bushell	2:51
Total length:			34:48
