= All We Are (album) =

Studio album by O.R.B.
- Released: 2 May 2014
- Genre: Acoustic; hip hop; pop
- Label: Gotta Gun
- Producer: Jake Gosling

O.R.B. chronology
This Life (2012)	All We Are (2014)

Singles from All We Are
- 1. "Never Gunna Walk Away" Released: 25 November 2013; 2. "Feel It in Your Soul" Released: 18 April 2014; 3. "Can't Let Go" Released: 3 June 2014; 4. "Never Alone" Released: 14 November 2014

All We Are is the second studio album by Irish acoustic hip-hop group O.R.B. released on iTunes on 2 May 2014 through Gotta Run Records. It entered the Independent Album Charts at number one and the first single, "Never Gonna Walk Away", won "Song of the Year" at the Meteor Choice Music Awards.

On 21 November 2014, a deluxe edition was released on iTunes.

== Track listing ==
All tracks are written by Sean "Neddy" Arkins, Robert Burch, Sean Walsh, Duck Blackwell and Paddy Dalton

All We Are track listing
No.	Title	Length
1.	"Never Gonna Walk Away"	3:48
2.	"Feel It in Your Soul"	4:00
3.	"Never Alone"	3:43
4.	"Can't Let Go"	3:43
5.	"What If"	3:45
6.	"Last of a Nation"	4:09
7.	"Ever Wonder"	3:52
8.	"Gone Are the Days"	3:43
9.	"One Last Song"	4:09
10.	"Get Out"	3:54
11.	"Stay Strong"	5:03
12.	"Stereotypes" (featuring Mikill Pane)	4:26

Deluxe version bonus tracks
No.	Title	Length
13.	"Never Gonna Walk Away" (live)	5:46
14.	"Written Songs (Feeling Good)" (live)	5:40
15.	"Blue Eyes" (live)	4:30
16.	"Never Alone" (live)	3:59
17.	"Travelling Man" (live)	4:38
18.	"Stereotypes" (live)	5:10
19.	"Stars in My Eyes" (live)	6:13

== Charts ==
Chart performance for All We Are
Chart (2014)	Peak position
Irish Albums (IRMA)	2
Irish Independent Albums (IRMA)	1
