= Wearing My Rolex =

2008 single by Wiley

Single by Wiley

from the album See Clear Now
- Released: 21 April 2008
- Genre: Electro-grime; electronic; hip house
- Length: 2:53 (radio edit); 2:10 (music video version); 5:48 (full version); 7:05 (extended club edit)
- Label: Asylum; Warner
- Songwriter: Richard Cowie
- Producer: Bless Beats

Wiley singles chronology
"My Mistakes" (2007)	"Wearing My Rolex" (2008)	"Summertime" (2008)

"Wearing My Rolex" is a song by British grime musician Wiley. Described as "grime-meets-electro" on BBC Radio 1Xtra, the song samples DSK's song "What Would We Do" and was released on 21 April 2008 by Asylum Records and Atlantic Records. The track was produced by Bow producer Bless Beats. "Wearing My Rolex" peaked at number two on the UK Singles Chart.

An a cappella gangsta-rap version of "Wearing My Rolex", performed by the main cast, featured in the original Royal Court Theatre production of Laura Wade's stage play Posh (2010). The song was ranked at number 284 in Pitchfork Media's list of the Top 500 Tracks of the 2000s.

The song was rumoured to be inspired by a long, late-night poker session with David Myatt, in which Wiley lost his titular watch to the occultist.

== Music video ==
The video for the song is set in London, and features a group of women dressed as and behaving like foxes.

== Track listings ==
Digital download single

1. "Wearing My Rolex" (radio edit)

Enhanced CD single

1. "Wearing My Rolex" (radio edit)
2. "Wearing My Rolex" (club (extended) edit)
3. "Wearing My Rolex" (Niteryders remix)
4. "Wearing My Rolex" (Pirate Soundsystem bassline mix)
5. "Wearing My Rolex" (Shoes remix)
6. "Wearing My Rolex" (video)

== Chart performance ==
"Wearing My Rolex" initially entered the UK Singles Chart at number four. It rose to number three and eventually peaked at number two. In total, the song remained in the top 100 of the chart for 22 weeks. The single also charted in Denmark, peaking at number 32 on the Danish Singles Chart on 25 July 2008 and staying on the chart for seven weeks.

=== Weekly charts ===
Chart (2008)	Peak position
Australia Digital Tracks (ARIA)	42
Denmark (Tracklisten)	32
Europe (Eurochart Hot 100)	7
Hungary (Editors' Choice Top 40)	39
Scottish Singles Sales (Official Charts)	6
UK Singles (Official Charts)	2
UK Dance (Official Charts)	1

=== Year-end charts ===
Chart (2008)	Position
UK Singles (OCC)	34
UK Urban (Music Week)	18

== Certifications ==
Region	Certification	Certified units/sales
United Kingdom (BPI)	Platinum	600,000^{‡}
^{‡} Sales+streaming figures based on certification alone.
