= The Original Rudeboys =

Irish band

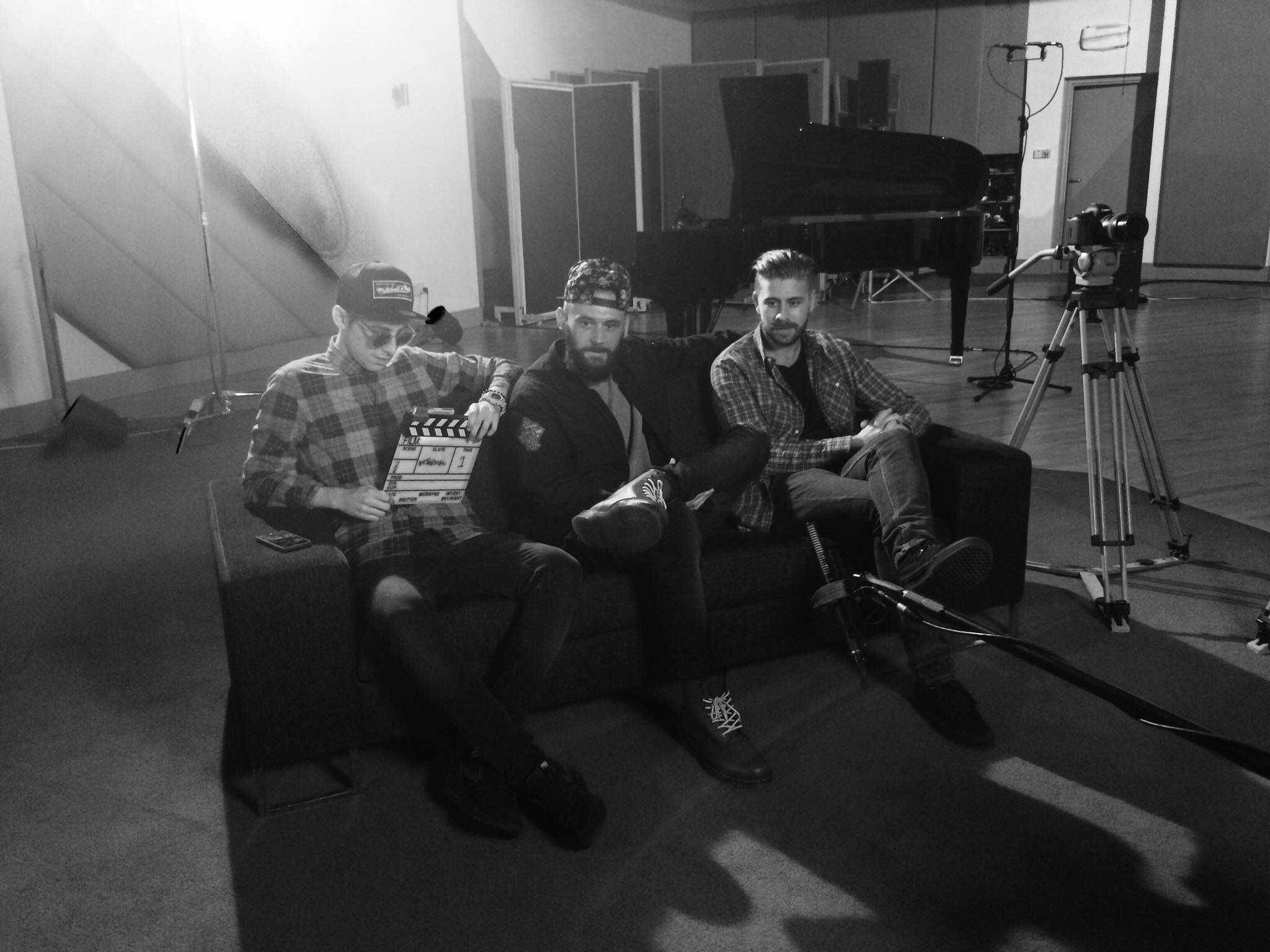
- The Original Rudeboys in 2020

Background information
- Origin: Dublin, Ireland
- Genres: Acoustic, indie, hip hop
- Instruments: Guitar, ukulele
- Years active: 2011– (hiatus: 2016-2020)
- Labels: Gotta Run Records, Rubyworks Records, Warner Music Group
- Members: Sean "Neddy" Arkins; Robert Burch; Sean "Walshy" Walsh
- Website: www.orbhq.com

The Original Rudeboys (O.R.B.) are an acoustic pop/hip hop group from Dublin. They are notable for their debut album This Life which was released in 2012 and debuted at number one on the Irish iTunes Charts, and their single "Stars in My Eyes", which hit number 2 on iTunes and received national airplay. They have played at venues such as the Olympia Theatre and at festivals such as Oxegen and the Reading and Leeds Festivals.

The band consists of Sean "Neddy" Arkins (rap vocals), Robert Burch (guitar and vocals), and Sean "Walshy" Walsh (ukulele). The band's genre has been described as a cross between hip hop and indie.

== History ==
=== Formation ===
The three bandmates grew up together in the same neighbourhood in the North Inner City of Dublin. They became friends around the ages of 7 or 8. They each wrote and performed music individually before coming together as "The Original Rudeboys". A lot of the songs on their debut album were written two to three years before they became a band.

The Original Rudeboys first became a band in March 2011 after having met at the home of a mutual friend. They decided to come together and write a song after a couple of drinks. This impromptu session was recorded and uploaded to YouTube where it first gained recognition. This song, "Stars in My Eyes", went on to become the band's first official single. According to the group they had no intention of becoming a band but after seeing the views on their videos rise they decided to take on the music industry. The band's name came about from a T-shirt bearing the words "The Original Rudeboys" that Arkins wore to a band appearance. Jokingly claiming the shirt to be part of the band's merchandise, the band adopted the phrase as their official name.

After one month, the band gained the interest of the Irish media and were invited onto a chat show on TV3. From this appearance they received invitations from many more media outlets such as national radio stations and also an appearance on RTÉ's The Saturday Night Show. The band then went on to put on their first headline show in Dublin's Academy 2 where they sold out three shows.

=== Summer 2011 ===
Based on their single YouTube video, the band quickly gained attention, earning festival appearances and gigs in both Ireland and England. They decided to write some more songs and record videos for each. These videos ("Live Your Life", "Sunny Days" and "Bringing Me Down") each went viral in their own right. The video for "Sunny Days" is a dedication to a friend of the group who died due to suicide. It features the band having a barbecue with their friends and touches on the issue of suicide awareness.

In Ireland The Original Rudeboys joined up with UB40, The Coronas and The Rubberbandits at the inaugural Strawberry Fest in Wexford in June and 50 Cent and Faithless at the first ever Waterford Music Festival in July.

The band also played the Oxegen Festival on the Vodafone stage in July. They played to a crowd of 5,000 where they were spotted by a BBC reporter and were subsequently invited to play the Introducing Stage at both Leeds Festival and Reading Festival in August. Among the crowd at the Reading Festival was producer Jake Gosling who approached the band after their set and asked if they would like to work with him. After the festival they joined him in his studio and recorded some tracks, including the official version of "Stars in My Eyes", that were collected and release as the Travelling Man EP. The band later returned to Sticky Studios to record their first full album, This Life.

=== This Life ===
During the winter of 2011 the band returned to the UK to complete their first album, This Life, which includes ten original tracks and re-recordings of the previously self-recorded YouTube tracks. The band returned from the UK to release their first official single, "Stars in My Eyes", which was released on 14 October 2011 and peaked at No. 2 in the Irish iTunes charts and No. 18 on the Irish Singles Chart. The album was released on 23 March 2012 and debuted at No. 1 on the Irish iTunes charts, No. 1 on The Independent Charts and No. 3 on the Irish Albums Chart. Their second single, "Travelling Man", went straight to No. 1 on the Irish iTunes chart and peaked at No. 23 on the Irish Singles Chart.

Off the back of this success the band went to travel the country playing gigs in some of Ireland's most prestigious venues. They supported international artists such as US rapper The Game and English rapper Professor Green as well as Irish artists Sinéad O'Connor and Damien Dempsey at their headline shows. In December 2012 it was announced The Original Rudeboys would be supporting fellow Irish band The Script on the European dates of their 2013 world tour. The album This Life has officially gone platinum since 12/12/13.

== Touring issues ==
On 7 July 2012 they supported Swedish House Mafia on their final Irish date before they disbanded, in Phoenix Park, Dublin, with Calvin Harris, Snoop Dogg and Tinie Tempah. During the concert two people died from drug overdoses and nine were stabbed, while 30 were arrested for assault, drugs and public order offences.

In November 2012, The Original Rudeboys turned down an opportunity to open for Chris Brown on 3 December 2012 in Dublins O2 Arena. They stated that this was due to his 2009 attack on his former girlfriend, Rihanna. Walshy gave an interview with RTÉ saying they were "completely against Chris Brown's assault on Rihanna" and supporting him "would send out the wrong message to our fans."

== Second album ==
On 7 October 2013, the band posted a clip of a new song titled "Never Gonna Walk Away" on their Facebook page. The song was released on 22 November 2013 and went on to win Song of the Year at the Meteor Choice Music Awards.

On 18 February 2014, the band announced the second single from their second album, titled "Feel It In Your Soul". The song was released on 25 April 2014, and hit number 1 on iTunes in under 24 hours.

On 19 February 2014 it was announced that the band had changed their name to O.R.B..

On 23 March 2014, the band announced the title of their second album, All We Are. The album was released on iTunes on 2 May 2014 and hit number 1 on the Irish Independent Albums Chart.

On 3 June 2014, "Can't Let Go" was released as the third single off the album. On 14 November 2014, "Never Alone" was released as the fourth single, and as a charity single linked with Console Ireland to help suicide awareness

== 2015 ==
On 15 April 2015, a brand new song titled "I Wanna Fly" was posted on their Facebook page, and on 21 April 2015 was posted on their YouTube channel.

== Band members ==
Official members

- Sean "Neddy" Arkins – rapper, vocals
- Robert Burch – lead vocals, lead guitar
- Sean "Walshy" Walsh – ukulele

For live gigs:

- Ciaran Donnelly – bass player
- Alan Connon – drummer

== Saying goodbye ==
On 12 June 2016 the band announced their breakup to their fans and stated that they would play one last farewell gig on 27 August 2016.

== Return ==
On 26 January 2020, the band announced their return via Instagram, although, due to being abroad, Sean "Walshy" Walsh was not a part of the return.

On 27 January 2020, they posted artwork for a new song called "Hypocrite" on their Instagram; it was released on 31 January 2020. On 13 March 2020, they posted artwork for another new song called "Better Days" on their Instagram; it was released on 20 March 2020. On 22 May 2020, they posted a picture captioned "New Music 12/06/2020" with the hashtag #AFD, and on 5 June 2020 announced another new song called " All Falls Down". On 9 September 2020, they posted a picture captioned "Putting the final touches on a little something" with the hashtags #ComingSoon and #GL. On 11 September 2020 they announced a new song called "Guiding Light". It was released on 25 September 2020. On 14 December 2020, they posted a picture "I guess we fucked it up...", followed the next day by a picture "I didn't want us to end like this...", both hinting at a song called "I Called It Love", which was released on 18 December 2020.

On 29 August 2024, the band's first single in nearly 4 years "Fragile" was released.

== Discography ==
=== Albums ===
List of albums, with selected details, chart positions and certifications
Title	Album details	Chart positions	Certifications
Title	Album details	IRE	Certifications
This Life	Release date: 23 March 2012; Label: Gotta Run, Rubyworks; Format: CD, digital download	3	IRE: 2× Platinum
All We Are	Release date: 2 May 2014; Label: Rubyworks, Warner Music Group; Format: CD, digital download	2	

=== Extended plays ===
List of EPs, with selected details
Title	EP details
Travelling Man	Released: 12 March 2012; Label: Gotta Run; Format: CD, digital download
Written Songs (Feeling Good)	Released: 20 July 2012; Label: Gotta Run; Format: CD, digital download

=== Singles ===
List of singles, with selected chart positions
Title	Year	Peak chart position	Album
Title	Year	IRL	Album
"Stars in My Eyes"	2011	18	This Life
"Travelling Man"	2012	23	This Life
"Written Songs"	2012	39	This Life
"Blue Eyes"	2012	67	This Life
"Never Gonna Walk Away"	2013	9	All We Are
"Feel It in Your Soul"	2014	5	All We Are
"Can't Let Go"	2014	—	All We Are
"While We're Young"	2015	—	Non-album singles
"Hypocrite"	2020	16	Non-album singles
"Better Days"	2020	—	Non-album singles
"All Falls Down"	2020	—	Non-album singles
"Guiding Light"	2020	—	Non-album singles
"I Called It Love"	2020	—	Non-album singles
"Fragile"	2024	—	Non-album singles
"—" denotes a title that did not chart.
