= If I Could (Wiley song) =

Wiley's single featuring Ed Sheeran and Chill Out Zone

Single by Wiley featuring Ed Sheeran

from the album Chill Out Zone
- Released: 15 May 2011
- Genre: R&B; grime
- Length: 3:07 (radio edit)
- Label: Elusive
- Songwriters: Richard Cowie; Ed Sheeran
- Producer: Jay Weathers

Wiley singles chronology
| "Seduction" (2011) | "If I Could" (2011) | "Boom Blast" (2012) |

Ed Sheeran singles chronology
| "If I Could" (2011) | "The A Team" (2011) |

"If I Could" is a single from English rapper Wiley, featuring vocals from British singer-songwriter Ed Sheeran. It is the second single released from his extended-play album, Chill Out Zone. It was released on 15 May 2011 as a digital download in the United Kingdom. The music video was uploaded to YouTube on 1 May 2011. It was shot in Kingston, Jamaica and was directed by Ben Peters.

== Track listing ==
- Digital download
1. "If I Could" – 3:07

== Credits and personnel ==
- Lead vocals – Wiley, Ed Sheeran
- Producer – Jay Weathers
- Lyrics – Richard Cowie, Ed Sheeran
- Label – Elusive

== Chart performance ==
| Chart (2011) | Peak position |
|---|---|
| UK Indie (OCC) | 26 |

== Release history ==
| Country | Date | Format | Label |
|---|---|---|---|
| United Kingdom | 15 May 2011 | Digital download | Elusive |
