= Wiley (musician) =

British rapper (born 1979)

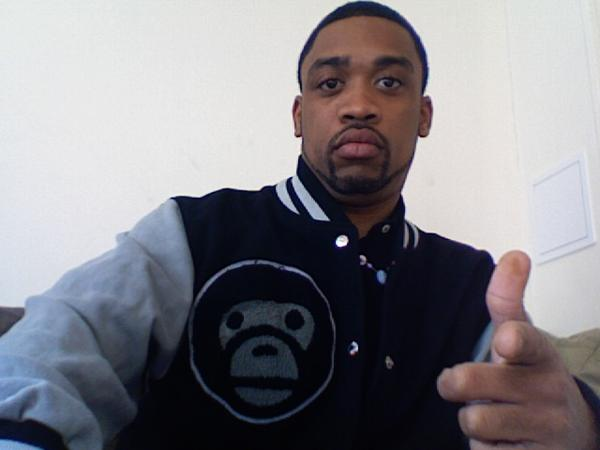
- Wiley in 2011

Background information
- Born: Richard Kylea Cowie Jr. 19 January 1979 (age 47); London, England
- Genres: Hip-hop; grime; UK garage; jungle; drum and bass
- Occupations: MC; producer; songwriter
- Works: Wiley discography
- Years active: 1994–present
- Labels: XL (2004–2005); Big Dada (2007–2008); Asylum (2008–2008); Island (2009–2009); Virgin (2010–2010); Warner (2012–2014); CTA (2016–2018); Wiley (2020–present)
- Formerly of: SS Crew; Ladies Hit Squad; Pay as U Go; Roll Deep; Boasty Gang; Boy Better Know

Richard Kylea Cowie Jr. (born 19 January 1979), better known by his stage name Wiley (formerly Wiley Kat), is a British grime MC and producer from Bow, London. Wiley is often labelled the "Godfather of Grime". In the early 2000s, he independently released a series of highly influential eskibeat instrumentals on white label vinyl, such as the first in the series "Eskimo" and is known as a grime MC both for his solo work and for material released with his crew Roll Deep.

Wiley first tasted success as a member of the UK garage crew Pay as U Go, with whom he had a top 40 hit, "Champagne Dance" in 2001. Wiley has continued to make grime music while also releasing mainstream singles, such as the UK Singles Chart top 10 hits "Wearing My Rolex", "Never Be Your Woman", and his UK number-one "Heatwave". Wiley's eleventh album, Godfather (2017), peaked at number nine on the UK Albums Chart, becoming his highest-charting album of his career, and also won an "Outstanding Contribution to Music" award by NME.

Wiley has been stabbed on several occasions. In 2008, a stabbing left him with a visible scar on the left side of his face. On 24 July 2020, Wiley made a series of posts and videos on social media, widely condemned as antisemitic. Having been appointed Member of the Order of the British Empire (MBE) in the 2018 New Year Honours for services to music, in February 2024, the Honours Forfeiture Committee formally stripped Wiley of his honour for "bringing the honours system into disrepute".

== Early life ==
Wiley was born as Richard Kylea Cowie Jr. on 19 January 1979 in Bow, East London. He is of Trinidadian and Antiguan descent. Wiley’s father, Richard Cowie Senior was a reggae artist during Wiley’s youth in the 1980s and introduced Wiley to early hip-hop such as The Sugarhill Gang. Wiley’s interest in music began when his father introduced him to the drums. Wiley moved around London a lot as a child with his father before moving to Chatham, Kent to live with his grandmother when he was ten. Wiley spent a year in Chatham and described it as a bad time, saying "I just wanted to go and live with my dad. I felt abandoned." Wiley eventually moved back to Bow to live with his father when he was eleven years old.

When Wiley was a teenager in the early-1990s, he began to sell crack cocaine and heroin. Wiley was introduced to drug dealing by a DJ friend who was making a lot of money at the time. Wiley stopped dealing drugs when a local drug dealer who was much older than him began to threaten him and his friend. Wiley began producing music after he stopped dealing drugs as an alternative way to make money. Cowie started as a DJ, and eventually began rapping, incorporating garage music and drum and bass into his produced instrumentals which led to the creation of the first ever grime beats such as "Eskimo", produced in Christmas of 1999 or 2000 and officially released in 2002. He broadcast his productions over pirate radio stations such as Rinse FM. Initially Wiley went by the name DJ Wildchild, until a woman from Kool FM began using the name Wildchild herself and surpassed Wiley in popularity. As a result, he changed his name to Wiley Kat, references to a Thundercats character and the Looney Tunes character Wile E. Coyote, and later simply Wiley.

Though Wiley stopped selling drugs, he was still associated with criminal gangs and with people who took part in criminal activities. This led to Wiley being involved in many situations that were life-threatening. On one occasion, Wiley’s friend had solicited money from someone following a drug deal though the money never was paid, Wiley argued with the person who owed his friend money and eventually Cowie was ambushed when attending a show. The confrontation led to Wiley being stabbed seven times. Several weeks later, the same people attacked Wiley outside a sports retail store, which led to Wiley almost dying in a hospital in Hammersmith. Wiley has been stabbed more than twenty times in his lifetime and has been in numerous other life-threatening situations including being chased by a man with a samurai sword and being shot at with shotguns.

== Music career ==
=== 1996–2003: early years ===
As a teenager, Wiley featured on pirate radio stations such as Rinse FM and drum and bass stations. In 2000, Wiley went from SS Crew to join The Ladies Hit Squad, a garage crew with his college friends DJ Target and MC Maxwell D. They achieved some success on the UK garage scene and soon decided to combine with rival crew Pay As U Go to become a 'super crew' containing members of Ladies Hit Squad, as well as Slimzee, Geeneus and MCs Major Ace and Plague Alero from Brown Brothers whom Wiley occasionally deejayed for. God's Gift from Dek Collecters, Flowdan and Riko Dan joined soon after. In 2002, the collective achieved a top 20 hit with "Champagne Dance". Wiley also received wide recognition in 2000 for his UK garage record "Nicole's Groove" which he produced under the stage name Phaze One.

After Pay As U Go disbanded, Wiley went on to form the Roll Deep entourage, which included Dizzee Rascal and Tinchy Stryder. They moved away from a traditional UK garage sound, and eventually found themselves creating music that would be termed grime.

From 2001 onwards, Wiley began producing instrumental singles on his Wiley Kat Recordings label, including "Eskimo", "Avalanche", "Ice Rink" and "Snowman". These led to a solo record deal with XL Recordings.

=== 2004–2007: Treddin' on Thin Ice, Da 2nd Phaze and Playtime Is Over ===
In 2004, Wiley released his debut album, Treddin' on Thin Ice on XL. Singles from the album include "Wot Do U Call It?", a record questioning what name should be given to his music, and "Pies". Wiley's use of the Korg Triton on "Wot Do U Call It?" helped cement the synthesizer as a Grime staple. Many reviews, including that by Pitchfork Media, made comparisons between Wiley and his previous labelmate Dizzee Rascal, who had achieved success with Boy in Da Corner the previous year. Alexis Petridis of The Guardian noted the "comically polarised" fanbase Wiley had accrued; "At one extreme, its sonic experimentation has attracted the kind of people who run music blogs... [where] lengthy essays are posted on issues as the differentiation between Humean and Kantian views of motivation in the lyrics of Bonnie Prince Billy. At the other extreme, it is favoured by inner-city teens who appear to communicate entirely in an impenetrable mix of street slang and patois."

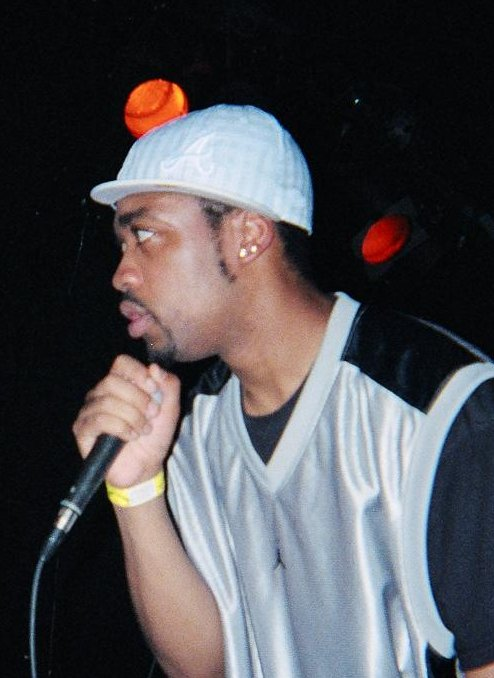
Wiley in 2005

During this period, Wiley occasionally referred to his music as "eski", short for "eskibeat" – the name he initially gave to grime. Also, Wiley released mixtapes under the name 'Eskiboy'. He explained his choice of name for his music and the continuing theme in his song and album titles such as Treddin' on Thin Ice, partly because he likes the wintertime, but mainly meaning cold in spirit. Wiley was quoted in conjunction with his cold theme:

"Sometimes I just feel cold hearted. I felt cold at that time, towards my family, towards everyone. That's why I used those names"

Many of Wiley's early vinyl releases, such as 'Eskimo', were released under the alias "Wiley Kat"; this name was derived from a character in the cartoon Thundercats. However, the "Kat" is never officially used by Wiley any more, only being mentioned loosely in some of his songs.

In early 2005, Wiley featured on Ruff Sqwad's track "Together", from their mixtape Guns and Roses Volume 1 (released March 2005 on Ruff Sqwad Recordings). The song became a notable underground hit in the UK grime scene.

During this period, grime tracks spread rapidly among young people in London through Bluetooth file sharing on mobile phones at schools, on public transport, and at social gatherings, predating mainstream streaming and social media. This grassroots method helped drive the viral popularity of tracks like "Together" in the mid-2000s grime scene.

A separate "Together" EP was released in September 2005. The collaboration highlighted Wiley's influence in supporting emerging grime acts.

In 2006, Wiley released his second album Da 2nd Phaze, released through Boy Better Know. The album consists of 20 tracks that have been put together by Wiley from the past three years, including exclusive bonus tracks from Gods Gift, Alex Mills and More Fire Crew.

This was followed in by Wiley's third album, Playtime is Over, released in 2007 on Big Dada Records, an album which followed his eskibeat roots. Wiley's eskibeat and solo material is managed by the Perpetuity Music Group. The album was released on the same day as Dizzee Rascal's third album, Maths + English, and includes a track "Letter 2 Dizzee" which calls for the end of his feud with Dizzee Rascal.

=== 2008–2009: Grime Wave, See Clear Now and Race Against Time ===
In May 2008, Wiley found mainstream chart success with the hit single, "Wearing My Rolex". The instrumentation, such as the slower, house style beat and lack of sub bass, caused some unrest within the grime scene, as Wiley had previously vowed that he would never change his sound to break into the mainstream. In the same month, Wiley released his fourth album, Grime Wave, which was described by The Times as a "very pre-Rolex album. With its roots firmly based in the harsh, bass-heavy rhythms of the scene". This was followed by his fifth studio album, See Clear Now, in October 2008, which included the mainstream hits "Wearing My Rolex", "Cash in My Pocket" and "Summertime". See Clear Now took Wiley in a mainstream direction. Despite its success, Wiley has disowned the album as he was "very angry" with the label Asylum, about the production and also unhappy about his management at the time. Wiley then left the label.

Now on his own label, Wiley went on to release his sixth studio album, Race Against Time. This was released eight months after his previous album in June 2009, on Eskibeat Recordings where he had far more creative control. The album includes the 2009 hit "Too Many Man" featuring Boy Better Know.

=== 2010–2011: Zip Files, iTunes Offload and 100% Publishing ===
In 2010, Wiley released 11 zip files for free download via his Twitter page, containing over 200 tracks of old and unreleased music, including tracks from the forthcoming album The Elusive.

Wiley was featured on the Mark Ronson song "Record Collection", also featuring Simon Le Bon, from the album of the same name, released first in Ireland on 24 September 2010. The song was included on the soundtrack to FIFA 11.

On 4 March 2011, Wiley released Offload Volume 01 on iTunes. It did not get a physical release and it was partially slated by fans for containing some tracks which had already been released for free on the zip files. The album contained many songs that featured Wiley's crew A-List as well as the track "Yo Riley". On 6 March 2011, Wiley released a song called "Bright Lights", which features Giggs and Juelz Santana. On 9 March 2011, Wiley released an instrumental album entitled Run the Riddim Selecta. Offload Volume 01, "Bright Lights" and Run the Riddim Selecta were all released on Launchpad Records. Wiley's seventh studio album, 100% Publishing, was released on 20 June 2011 on the record label Big Dada, and charted in the UK Albums Chart at number 76.

On 8 July 2011, Wiley released an independent EP for digital download titled Chill Out Zone. Singles from the EP, "Seduction" and "If I Could" were released in May 2011.

On 25 July 2011, Wiley released the radio edit of "Link Up" on iTunes, which is the first single from his eighth studio album, Evolve or Be Extinct, which was released on 19 January 2012. "Link Up" is produced by Nana Rogues and the official "Link Up" single was released in September 2011.

=== 2012–2013: Evolve or Be Extinct and The Ascent ===
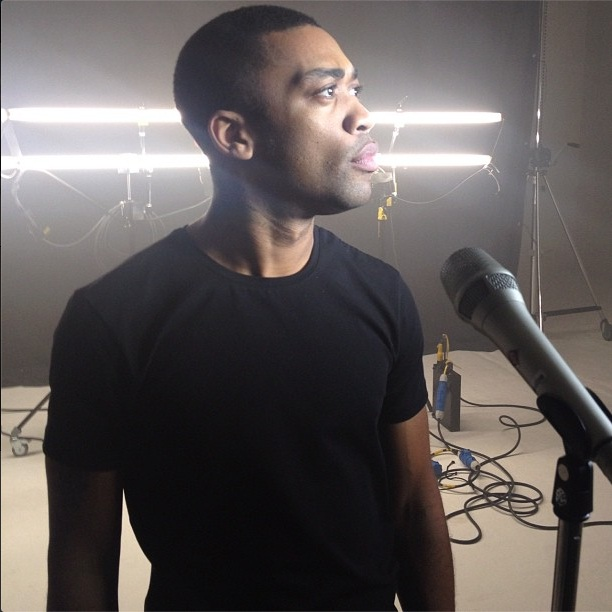
Wiley in 2012

In January 2012, he released his eighth studio album, Evolve or Be Extinct, on his 33rd birthday. It peaked at number 86 on the UK Albums Chart. Wiley began releasing grime freestyles over grime beats and releasing them for free via Twitter. This collection was released chronologically with the names "Step 1", "Step 2" and furthermore. After "Step 10", all of the freestyles were compiled and released as a mixtape titled It's All Fun and Games Till, Vol.1. Alongside working on his "Step" freestyles, various other promo songs were released. This continuous releasing of music saw him receive the attention from major recording label Warner Music Group. Wiley carried on with his "Step" freestyles, releasing Vol. 2 of It's All Fun and Games Till.

In June 2012, Wiley released his summer single "Heatwave", featuring Ms D and produced by Rymez to British radio, with the music video released at the end of June via YouTube. The song quickly received over 2 million hits. On 5 August 2012, "Heatwave" peaked at number 1 on the UK Singles Chart, making this Wiley's first solo number 1, selling 114,000 copies. Shortly after, Wiley confirmed in an interview on the Official Chart Show that he will be releasing a further two singles and a new album in the coming months. His next single, announced in late August, titled "Can You Hear Me" featuring Skepta, JME and Ms D, was released in October 2012. The song was renamed to "Can You Hear Me (Ayayaya)" and premiered on 24 August on DJ Target's BBC Radio 1Xtra show.

Wiley then announced on Twitter that the third single off his next album, Hands in the Air, will feature Chip, Ice-Kid (a member of the Grime collective, Hoodstars) and Tulisa for release on 13 September 2012. The song originally featured Emeli Sandé. However, Wiley then tweeted that his next single would feature Rita Ora instead of Tulisa. On 27 September, the name of the album was confirmed to be The Ascent. The tracklist for the album was revealed on 11 October via Instagram, displaying 16 tracks. Also on 11 October, Wiley announced he no longer intended to perform at universities and student unions, citing professional concerns and stating that he "had better things to do". Despite this, Wiley played a club night at SUSU, the University of Southampton Students' Union, on 25 January 2013 as part of the Ministry of Sound Raveout tour. Afterwards, Wiley took to Twitter to express his disappointment with the event, stating, "A proper crowd would [have] loved it tbh and tbf".

On 4 April 2013, Wiley said that he was leaving his record label Warner following a dispute about The Ascent. Admitting he was unhappy with their choice of next single from the record, he tweeted: "My label are doing 'Lights On' next but I do not like that so you will not see me in the video."

On 11 October 2013, over 2,000 Wiley fans signed a petition, which was presented to Tower Hamlets' mayor Lutfur Rahman, requesting that a monument to the artist be erected in Bow.

On 19 October 2013, Wiley was awarded "Best Male" at the MOBO Awards' 18th Anniversary.

=== 2014–2015: Snakes & Ladders ===
Wiley began recording his tenth studio album, Snakes & Ladders, in 2013. The first single from the album, "Flyin", was released in August 2013, and towards the end of that year he leaked a track list for the album. However, he later confirmed his intention in February 2014 to scrap the record and start again as he was unhappy with it, saying it "needs to be epic or there's no point". The first single from the newly recorded album, ""On A Level", was released on 25 September 2014 by Big Dada. Wiley was later featured on Ay Yeah So What, and in 2015 released the non-album single ""Chasing the Art"".

=== 2016–2021: Godfather series and Boasty Gang album ===
In March 2016, Wiley announced that he would be releasing his eleventh studio album, Godfather, and that the album would include 16 songs, 3 of which were to be released as singles. The album was released on 13 January 2017. The album entered at number 9 on the UK Albums Chart, becoming Wiley's highest-charting album of his career. On 16 February 2017, Wiley won an "Outstanding Contribution to Music" award by NME for Godfather.

In late 2017, Wiley announced his next album, Godfather II. The first single, "I Call the Shots" featuring Jme, was released on 3 November 2017, alongside the album's pre-order and track listing. The album was released on 27 April 2018.

In January 2019, Wiley released "Boasty" featuring Idris Elba, Stefflon Don, and Sean Paul. The song was one of the biggest dancehall releases of the year.

Wiley announced Godfather III would be released on 2 November. After delays, the album was finally released on streaming services on 5 June 2020.

On 22 June 2020, Wiley released his 14th studio album, Boasty Gang – The Album. The album features a solo version of his hit single, "Boasty".

=== 2022–present: 'Anti-Systemic' album ===
Following the social media controversy in 2021, Wiley released his 15th studio album on all online music platforms in August 2022 Anti-Systemic.

The album was independently released with a limited run of vinyl and CD physical copies. The roll out of the 'Anti-Systemic' album involved a temporary website 'Anti-Systemic.com' with sold out merchandise including tracksuits, t-shirts, and stickers. Two singles were released on white label vinyl; 'Tourbus' produced by Olja Beats and 'Tinted Metro' by Teddy (Silencer). A third single was set for release 'I Aint Gonna Fold' also produced by Olja Beats, however this was not released due to vinyl manufacture delays during the COVID-19 pandemic.

Artist features included JME, Kozzie, Scrufizzer, Faultsz, Realz, SBK, Capo Lee, FFSYTHO, Preshus, Duppy, K9 and more.

Artwork for the album depicts Wiley in a protest setting. The front cover portrays a face off with police, and the back cover portrays a face off with aristocrats holding money and contracts. The artwork was provocative, as was the album title; a direct play on the recent social media controversy and accusations of antisemitism.

== A-List ==
In February 2010, Wiley formed a UK supergroup/collective called A-List. This group consists of R&B singers and sisters Shola and Sadie Ama; grime artists Wiley, J2K & Brazen all from Roll Deep; Mz. Bratt, Wrigley, Margs, Young Kye and Kivanc. Their producer is Bless Beats and their DJ is JJ.

A-List released their first music video on 23 March 2010 called "Midnight Lover", featuring Captin. Despite receiving airplay, the single was never released. The last 20 seconds of the music video is the A-List song "Make My Own Money".

== Legacy ==
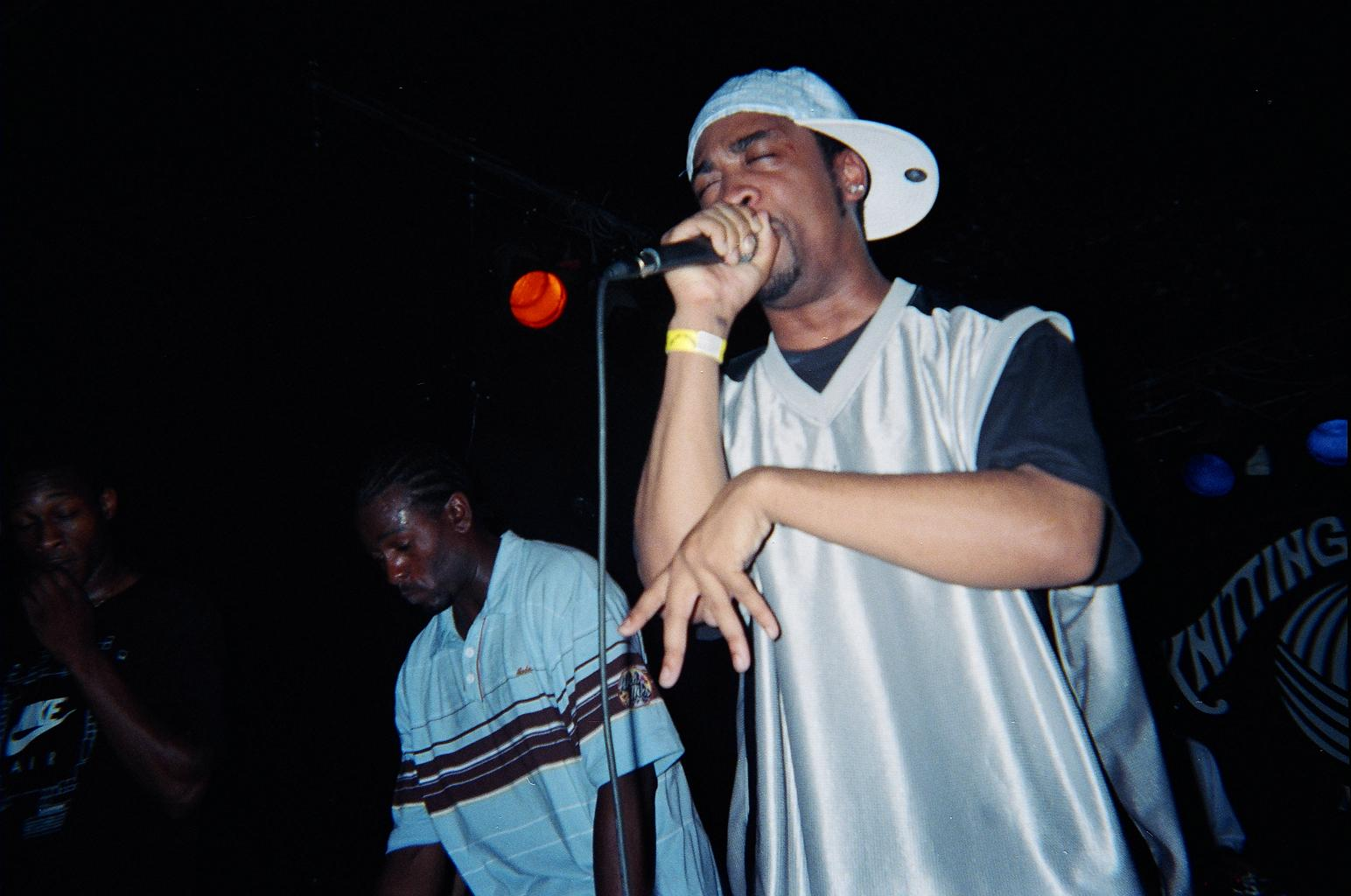
Wiley performing in 2005

Branded as the "British Nas" by Noisey, Wiley is often cited as the "Godfather of Grime" and the "King of Grime". Other grime artists have cited Wiley as a big influence in their careers. He has been a prolific artist producing several albums and mixtapes for a number of labels. His origins have often been a subject of his work (e.g. "Bow E3").

== Record labels ==
Wiley has been with a number of record labels. In 2004, Eskibeat Recordings was formed by Wiley to bring young grime artists into the spotlight as well as release his own music under the label. In 2005.

In 2010, Wiley founded A-List Records (A-List Music LTD). On 26 and 27 September 2012, Wiley signed J2K and Ice-Kid to A-List Records. Two weeks after, he had also signed Scratchy Demus, Manga and A. Star (the younger brother of singer Angel) to the record label. Wrigley from Manchester is also signed to the label. Producers include Rymez who is behind the hits "Heatwave" and "Can You Hear Me?" and Flava D.

In 2015, Wiley released an EP on his new record label called Chasing The Art Records. In 2016, Wiley and his manager John Woolf signed a distribution deal with Warner Music Group to release some music by Wiley and future artists that sign to the label.

Wiley is currently signed to Big Dada and Boy Better Know. He has a joint venture distribution deal with Warner Music Group under two brand names, one being Wiley, and the other being Chasing the Arts records, as of 2017.

Following his alleged antisemitic tweets, on 25 July 2020, Big Dada released a statement saying that "we fully condemn Wiley's comments and royalties from those records will be donated to campaigns that fight anti-Semitism."

== Personal life ==
Cowie has two daughters and one son. His younger half-brother Cadell is also a grime artist. Despite previous antisemitic comments, he supports the English football team Tottenham Hotspur, which has a longstanding connection to London's Jewish community and whose fans refer to themselves as "Yids" or "Yiddos". The name Wiley is derived from the ThunderCats cartoon character, 'WilyKat', a name he used briefly.

Wiley has been stabbed on several occasions. One of his stab wounds in 2008 resulted in a scar visible on the left hand side of his face. He has stated he was slashed in the face three days before the shoot of "Wearing My Rolex", and the scar on his face ruined his confidence and self-esteem for a while: he did not want to turn up to interviews or music videos.

Wiley's autobiography, Eskiboy, was published in November 2017.

== Views and legal issues ==
=== Antisemitism on social media ===
On 14 July 2020, Wiley made a series of posts and videos on social media on 24 July 2020, generally condemned as antisemitic, that described Jewish people as "cowards" and "snakes", alleged significant racism and exploitation from Jewish people towards black people (particularly in business and the music industry), and compared the power of the Jewish community to that of white supremacist group Ku Klux Klan. He also tweeted that Jews write laws, own the police, run banks and run the world. Wiley received a temporary ban from Twitter. A police investigation was launched into the posts. The next day, Wiley's manager John Woolf announced that Wiley had been dropped from A-List Management.

The Campaign Against Antisemitism issued a statement saying: "We consider that Wiley has committed the offence of incitement to racial hatred, which can carry a substantial prison sentence." and said it had reported Wiley to the Metropolitan Police. Wiley's Twitter and Instagram accounts reportedly had a total of 940,000 followers. The CAA called for both his accounts to be removed and wrote to the Honours Forfeiture Committee at the Cabinet Office to ask for his MBE to be revoked.

Home Secretary Priti Patel demanded an explanation from Twitter and Instagram on the length of time it took to remove the posts. On 27 July, a 48-hour boycott of Twitter by some users was started under the hashtag "#NoSafeSpaceForJewHate", protesting the social media site's slow response to the tweets. The following day, Facebook, Inc. deleted his personal accounts on Facebook and Instagram for "repeated violations" of their terms of conduct in his posts towards Jewish celebrities who had criticised him. On 29 July 2020, it was announced that Wiley was permanently suspended from Twitter.

On 29 July 2020, Wiley apologised for generalising about Jewish people and said that he is not a racist.

In August 2020, Wiley was suspended from YouTube and TikTok. In response, he joined social media app Parler, a right-wing social media platform. The following month, the Metropolitan Police dropped their investigation when it was discovered that Wiley was in Rotterdam in the Netherlands when he sent the messages, and thus not under the jurisdiction of English law.

In October 2020, The Campaign Against Antisemitism said that it had launched a private prosecution against Wiley to pursue race-hate charges.

On 2 December 2021, Wiley was banned from Twitter and Instagram again for using a new account to share antisemitic content.

=== Assault and burglary charges ===
On 6 September 2021, Wiley was arrested and subsequently charged with assault and burglary. He is alleged to have broken into the flat of ex-kickboxer Ali Jacko, smashed plates and then assaulted him and caused injury. Before the coronavirus pandemic, Wiley used Jacko's recording studio. During pre-trial hearings, Wiley was granted an adjournment to allow him more time to apply for legal aid due to his presently impoverished state, and speak to his lawyers. Wiley was scheduled to appear at Thames Magistrates' Court on 27 September, charged with assault by beating and burglary with intent to cause criminal damage.

Wiley failed to appear in court, and subsequently on 11 November 2021 the district judge issued an arrest warrant due to his failing to appear at Snaresbrook Crown Court. On 11 May 2022, the Metropolitan Police issued an official wanted notice announcing that it had been six months since Wiley was due in court. In February 2024, Sky News reported that in June 2023 Wiley had "entered guilty pleas at London's Snaresbrook Crown Court for an assault on an emergency worker and for criminal damage to property valued under £5,000" for which he given a one-month suspended prison sentence and ordered to pay £470 in victim compensation.

In February 2024, his appointment as an MBE was revoked.

== Awards and nominations ==
Award	Year	Nominee(s)	Category	Result	Ref.
MOBO Awards	2004	Himself	Best Producer	Nominated	
MOBO Awards	2005	Roll Deep	Best UK Newcomer	Nominated	
MOBO Awards	2005	Roll Deep	UK Act of the Year	Won	
MOBO Awards	2013	Himself	Best Male	Won	
NME Awards	2017	Himself	Outstanding Contribution to Music	Won	

== Discography ==
Studio albums

- Treddin' on Thin Ice (2004)
- Da 2nd Phaze (2006)
- Playtime Is Over (2007)
- Grime Wave (2008)
- See Clear Now (2008)
- Race Against Time (2009)
- 100% Publishing (2011)
- Evolve or Be Extinct (2012)
- The Ascent (2013)
- Snakes & Ladders (2014)
- Godfather (2017)
- Godfather II (2018)
- The Godfather III (2020)
- Boasty Gang – The Album (2020)
- Anti-Systemic (2021)
