= The Fiery Furnaces discography =

Below is a listing of the official release by the band The Fiery Furnaces.

== Studio albums ==
- Gallowsbird's Bark (2003)
- Blueberry Boat (2004)
- EP (2005)
- Rehearsing My Choir (2005)
- Bitter Tea (2006)
- Widow City (2007)
- I'm Going Away (2009)
- Take Me Round Again (2009)
- Stuck in My Head (2024)

== Live albums ==
- Remember (2008)

== Singles ==
- "Crystal Clear" (2003)
- "Tropical Ice-Land" (2004)
- "Single Again" (2004)
- "Benton Harbor Blues" (2006)
- "The End Is Near" (2009)
- "Down at the So and So on Somewhere" (2020)
- "The Fortune Teller's Revenge" (2020)
- "Far Away" (2025)

== Compilation appearances ==
- Rough Trade Shops: Counter Culture 03 (2004)
- Stop Me If You Think You've Heard This One Before (2003)
- White Riot: A Tribute to the Clash Volume 1 (2003)
- The Rough Trade Field Guide to Music, Volume One (2004)
- Sunday Nights: The Songs of Junior Kimbrough (2005)
- This Bird Has Flown - A 40th Anniversary Tribute to the Beatles' Rubber Soul (2005)
