= My Mistakes (Eleanor Friedberger song) =

Single by Eleanor Friedberger

from the album Last Summer
- Released: June 14, 2011
- Recorded: Summer 2010
- Genre: synth-pop
- Length: 4:28
- Label: Merge Records
- Songwriter: Friedberger
- Producer: Eric Broucek

Eleanor Friedberger singles chronology
"My Mistakes" (2011)	"Heaven" (2011)

Music video
- "My Mistakes" on YouTube

"My Mistakes" is a song recorded by American singer-songwriter Eleanor Friedberger. Released in 2011, it marked Friedberger's debut solo single, following her work as one-half of the musical duo The Fiery Furnaces. It served as the lead single and opening track from her first studio album, Last Summer. The song's lyrics move back and forth in time, as Friedberger reflects on emotional and physical pains past and present, while the production features a two-chord guitar, keyboards, and a saxophone solo.

Upon its release, the single drew acclaim from music critics, who praised its accessibility and tone; multiple critics also deemed it one of her catchiest songs ever. It became a top 40 hit on the Billboard Mexico Ingles Airplay chart, where it spent five nonconsecutive weeks and peaked at number 36. An accompanying music video featured old video footage of a 19-year-old Friedberger from a college project, mixed with newly recorded footage, of Friedberger preparing for a date, kissing classmate (and future Spoon frontman) Britt Daniel, and playing guitar on a front stoop. It drew favorable reviews from critics as well, who commended its concept and nostalgia.

== Background ==
Friedberger and her brother, Matthew, first gained attention as the indie rock musical duo The Fiery Furnaces. The group released their first album, Gallowsbird's Bark, in 2003, and went on to release eight studio albums, concluding with I'm Going Away in 2009; they acquired a reputation for an experimental and eclectic musical style. In May 2011, Friedberger independently recorded her contributions for the duo's next musical release, Take Me Round Again, and during that time was inspired to begin writing music that she could perform solo; those compositions would ultimately become the basis for her debut album, Last Summer. She began solo recording in Summer 2010, during which time she recorded the entirety of Last Summer. The project was produced by Eric Broucek.

In May 2011, following a performance at the Primavera Sound Festival in Barcelona, The Fiery Furnaces announced that they were going on hiatus and would be pursuing solo recording projects. Matthew had already released his first solo album, Napoleonette, in January, and in April, Eleanor had announced that her debut solo album would be released in July of that year. Along with her announcement, Friedberger released her first solo recording, "My Mistakes".

== Composition ==
"My Mistakes" is a synthpop song in 4/4 time with a tempo of 135 beats per minute, and a length of four minutes and twenty-nine seconds. Its instrumentation has been described as "interesting and wacky", with unusual instrument choices "introduced gradually" so that each has time to adapt to the melody. For the entirety of the song, its guitar consists of a two-chord pattern, with a bass coming in around the thirty-second mark and keyboards setting the chorus apart. The end of the song features a saxophone solo that one critic described as "jazz fusiony" and which was deemed by another to have a "cheerfully untrendy retro vibe". The synthesizer was described as a "relentlessly cheerful… riff".

The song uses a traditional verse-chorus structure, considered unusual for Friedberger given her earlier Fiery Furnaces work. Its lyrics are autobiographical and have been called "winsome". A record review by John Murphy for MusicOMH observed that the lyric is ambiguous, such that it "could be about anything from crashing on a bridge to time travel". Its opening line is "You know I do my best thinking when I'm flying down the bridge/ humming to myself and kicking up my kicks", which one critic interpreted as a signal of what was to come lyrically on This Summer. Friedberger goes on to reflect on the time that the bridge was "just a wooden path", as well as reflecting on past physical and emotional pains, including a car crash, a skinned knee, and a lover who ignores her. She repeatedly asks "Why keep traveling if it doesn't get better on the second time around?" Friedberger noted that the lyric goes "back and forth in time. I'm describing something that had happened the previous summer, something 10 years before, and something at that moment." The lyric was also noted for its catchiness, while Friedberger's "distinct sing-speak style" was compared to a combination of Patti Smith and a child's imitation of a British accent.

== Release ==
Friedberger first released the song in April 2011, with Tiny Mix Tapes including the song in their "Chocolate Grinder" feature on April 22 and Stereogum covering the song on April 29. Friedberger officially released the song and music video on June 14, 2011, via Pitchfork. The song was later featured as the opening track on Last Summer, her debut solo studio album released in July 2011; its placement as the first song was widely noted and praised by critics.

== Reception ==
=== Critical ===
Pitchfork's Lindsay Zoladz reviewed the single favorably, commending Friedberger for "striking the perfect balance between wistfulness and whimsy" and opining that by the saxophone solo, "it's hard not to be swept along by the track's carefree vibe". Zoladz also commended Friedberger's casual tone, crediting it with making the song one of Friedberger's "most instantly inviting" songs. Heather Phares, in a review of Last Summer for Allmusic, wrote that Friedberger's "charm… shows up in spades" on "My Mistakes", calling it — along with "I Won't Fall Apart on You Tonight" — "perhaps the most accessible songs Friedberger has ever sung." In his review of Last Summer, Murphy praised the song's selection as the record's opening track, calling it "a perfect introduction to the album" that "kicks (it) off… beautifully", as well as describing it as "bright, sunny, catchy but with a weird edge to it that makes for a compelling listen". James Reed, in a Boston.com review, deemed the track "the stunner" of the album and praised it for demonstrating "the album's deep sense of longing and nostalgia." Tiny Mix Tapes highlighted "My Mistakes" as one of the two "stand-outs" on the album. Reviews by both Under the Radar and BBC deemed the song one of Friedberger's catchiest songs.

=== Commercial ===
The single became Friedberger's first (and, to date, only) entry on the Mexico Ingles Airplay chart, a Billboard chart tracking the most-played English-language songs in Mexico. "My Mistakes" debuted at number 50 on the chart dated August 20, 2011, and rose to number 44 the following week before falling off. It re-entered the chart the week of September 10, 2011, and the following week jumped seven spots to its peak position of number 36. It fell off the following week, but re-entered for one week at number 38 on the chart dated October 1, 2011.

== Music video ==
=== Production ===
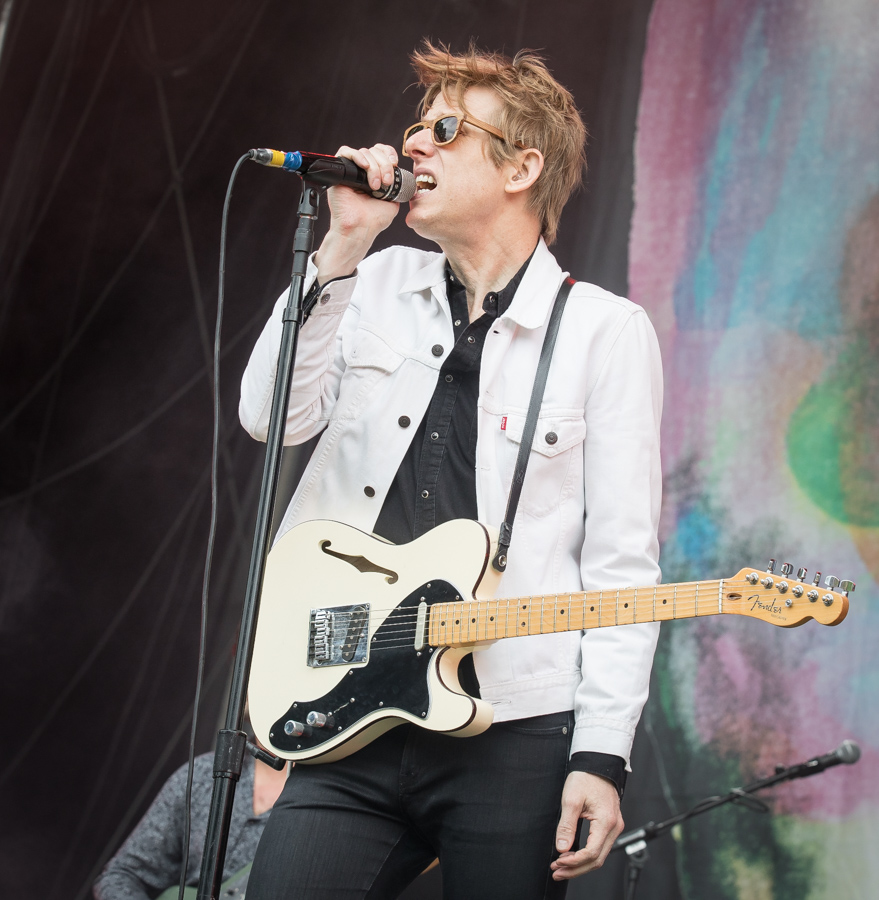
Britt Daniel, lead singer of rock band Spoon, suggested that Friedberger include new footage in the music video.

For the song's accompanying music video, Friedberger drew inspiration from a humorous fifteen-year-old VHS tape her friend Beth Lieberman found from when the two were students at the University of Texas. Friedberger had appeared in the video for Lieberman's art-class assignment. She decided, for the "My Mistakes" video, to use some of the scenes from the VHS, deciding that "it fit the tone of the song perfectly."

At the suggestion of Britt Daniel, frontman of rock group Spoon and a classmate of Friedberger's at UT who also appeared in the old video, she also included new footage, filmed in her Brooklyn apartment, of her doing the same things as in the old footage. She remarked that the alternation between old and new in the video matched the song's lyric, telling The Quietus that "I thought it was fun to go back and forth in time like that, which is what's happening in the song too." Another friend of Friedberger's, Sara Magenheimer, shot the modern footage for the music video. She also noted that she still owned many of the items — such as a Greek tourism poster and a dress — that appeared in the old video, allowing her to show them both in the new and old footage. She quipped that her still being able to fit into the old dress was "from doing all those sit-ups". Friedberger stated that the hardest part of filming the video was deciding how to end it. She and Magenheimer initially considered ending it with the date for which she's been preparing, but she ultimately decided on another conclusion. In an interview with Vogue, Friedberger remarked that the video "might have been trying to make some feminist statement, but it’s supposed to be a little bit of a joke."

=== Synopsis ===
The video depicts Friedberger preparing for a date, chatting on the phone, doing sit-ups, shaving her legs, and playing a vinyl record, alternating between footage of her doing those things at age 19 and now. The old footage also shows her on the date, making out with Daniel. Rather than recreate the scene with Daniel, she opted to close out the video with a scene in which she plays an acoustic guitar while sitting on a stoop "full of the sort of odd neighborhood characters she likes to sing about". She elaborated that she opted to finish it in that fashion because she wanted to show that "I do learn from my mistakes and choose something new, which is music. It's corny, but I like the sentiment."

=== Release and reception ===
The music video for "My Mistakes" premiered on Pitchfork on June 14, 2011. The Village Voice observed that initially, the video appears to be "a cautionary tale about how not much has changed for women since the era of VHS fuzz-outs" before turning out to be "sort of a sweet love letter to her relationship with music, and the fine art of eating on a New York City stoop on a summer day." Consequence of Sound interpreted one of the video's themes as being that people's "daily routines remain constant" despite technological and lifestyle developments since the 1990s. Rolling Stone commended the video's concept as a "clever idea".

Paste noted that the video had been "making its internet rounds" in the month leading up to the album's release. Some viewers didn't recognize Friedberger in the old footage; in a 2011 interview with The Quietus, Friedberger noted that "People have been asking me who the other girl is."

== Personnel ==
Credits are adapted from Last Summer liner notes.

- Songwriting — Eleanor Friedberger
- Production — Eric Broucek
- Mixing — Eric Broucek
- Mastering — Joe Lambert

== Charts ==
Chart (2011)	Peak position
Mexico Ingles Airplay (Billboard)	36
