= Andy Knowles (musician) =

Andy Knowles (born Andrew John Knowles; 30 June 1981, in Bolton) is an artist, director and musician.

Knowles started his drumming career with Skuta, and then in 2003 formed the cult group I Love Lucy out of the Glaswegian Art rock scene. Touring as drum tech with Glaswegian band Franz Ferdinand, Knowles met Matthew and Eleanor Friedberger of the New York band The Fiery Furnaces and was invited to join the group.

After extensive touring and recording drums on the Fiery Furnaces album Bitter Tea, Knowles left the band and rejoined Franz Ferdinand as a live drummer/keyboard player.

Knowles presently fronts the London-based band $au$age$.
