= Personal Record (album) =

Studio album by Eleanor Friedberger
- Released: June 4, 2013
- Recorded: October 2012
- Genre: Indie pop
- Length: 46:12
- Label: Merge
- Producer: Eric Broucek

Eleanor Friedberger chronology
Last Summer (2011)	Personal Record (2013)	New View (2016)

Personal Record is the second solo album released by American indie pop musician Eleanor Friedberger, most notable for being vocalist in the band The Fiery Furnaces with her brother Matthew Friedberger. The album was released on 4 June 2013 on the Merge Records label. The album was co-written by Friedberger and folk singer and novelist John Wesley Harding.

== Critical reception ==
Professional ratings
Aggregate scores
Source	Rating
Metacritic	79/100
Review scores
Source	Rating
Consequence of Sound	4/5 stars
Tiny Mix Tapes	4.5/5 marks
Paste Magazine	8.3/10
AllMusic	4/5 stars
PopMatters	8/10
Pitchfork	8.1/10
Los Angeles Times	2.5/4 stars

The album received positive reviews from music critics. At Metacritic, which assigns a normalized rating out of 100 to reviews from mainstream critics, the album received an average score of 79, which indicates "generally favorable reviews," based on 16 reviews. Lindsay Zoladz of Pitchfork praised the "tight, buoyant pop arrangements" and wrote that "very few [indie rock songwriters] are writing with half the precision, wit, and cool poise that Friedberger displays here." Heather Phares of AllMusic wrote that "even if the album is more comforting than exciting, it's still an enjoyable portrait of Friedberger's artistry: warm, genuine, and a little mischievous." Writing for the Los Angeles Times, Randall Roberts called the lyrics "odd" and the album itself "wonderfully askew," but said that though the album is not immediately gratifying, it is "a challenge worth taking."

== Track listing ==
No.	Title	Length
1.	"I Don't Want to Bother You"	3:56
2.	"When I Knew"	3:45
3.	"I'll Never Be Happy Again"	3:19
4.	"Stare at the Sun"	2:56
5.	"Echo or Encore"	4:50
6.	"My Own World"	3:37
7.	"Tomorrow Tomorrow"	3:20
8.	"You'll Never Know Me"	3:24
9.	"I Am the Past"	3:27
10.	"She's a Mirror"	3:46
11.	"Other Boys"	6:06
12.	"Singing Time"	3:46
