= My Mistakes =

My Mistakes may refer to:

- My Mistakes (Wiley song), 2007
- My Mistakes (Eleanor Friedberger song), 2011
