= Personal Record =

Personal record may refer to:

- personal record
- A Personal Record, autobiographical work (or "fragment of biography") by Joseph Conrad, published in 1912
- Personal Record, an album by Eleanor Friedberger
