= Remember (The Fiery Furnaces album) =

Live album by the Fiery Furnaces
- Released: August 19, 2008
- Recorded: October 2005–April 2008
- Genre: Indie rock
- Length: 132:02
- Label: Thrill Jockey
- Producer: Matthew Friedberger

The Fiery Furnaces chronology
| Widow City (2007) | Remember (2008) | I'm Going Away (2009) |

Professional ratings
Review scores
| Source | Rating |
|---|---|
| AllMusic | 4/5 stars |
| Cokemachineglow | (7.4/10) |
| Pitchfork | (4.3/10) |
| PopMatters | (7/10) |
| This Is Fake DIY | (5/10) |
| Web in Front | (Positive) |

Remember is the first live album from indie rock band the Fiery Furnaces, released on August 19, 2008 in the United States and September 8, 2008 in the United Kingdom. The album includes various live performances of songs from their first six studio albums, recorded between 2005 and the tour for their 2007 album, Widow City. Some longer songs, such as "Blueberry Boat" and "Quay Cur", have multiple cuts in the track from various performances. Other songs, such as the tracks from the Bitter Tea medley, were recorded live in the recording studio.

== Track listing ==
=== Disc one ===
Old HK

1. Intro – 0:41
2. Blueberry Boat – 8:27
3. Single Again – 3:33
4. Two Fat Feet – 2:28
5. Don't Dance Her Down – 3:26
6. Single Again (Reprise) – 2:03
7. Wicker Whatnots – 2:55

Waiting in the Lobby at 665 1/2 Frontage Road

8. Little Thatched Hut – 4:12
9. I'm in No Mood – 2:59
10. Black-Hearted Boy – 2:38
11. Bitter Tea – 2:47
12. Waiting to Know You – 1:34
13. Vietnamese Telephone Ministry – 2:46

In a House Once Owned by the Princes of Mataran

15. Oh Sweet Woods – 2:31
16. Borneo – 3:30
17. Benton Harbor Blues – 1:41
18. Japanese Slippers – 2:23
19. Benton Harbor Blues (Reprise) – 1:03
20. Whistle Rhapsody – 1:52
21. Crystal Clear – 1:39
22. Whistle Rhapsody (Reprise) – 1:15
23. Teach Me Sweetheart – 3:41
24. Evergreen – 1:37
25. Bitter Tea (Reprise) – 1:30

=== Disc two ===
Drinking by the Des Plaines River

1. Chris Michaels – 6:57
2. Quay Cur – 8:17
3. My Dog Was Lost But Now He's Found – 2:52
4. Spaniolated – 2:01
5. Name Game – 2:27
6. Birdie Brain – 2:28
7. 1917 – 3:08

Black Death Bottle

8. Slavin' Away (Intro) – 0:18
9. Tropical Ice-land – 3:29
10. Asthma Attack – 1:44
11. Tropical Ice-land (Reprise) – 0:26
12. The Wayward Granddaughter – 4:38
13. The Garfield El – 1:48
14. A Candymaker's Knife in My Handbag – 1:08
15. Forty-Eight Twenty-Three Twenty-Second St. – 2:40
16. Slavin' Away – 2:58
17. Seven Silver Curses – 1:40

A Special Commission of Navajo Basketball Coaches and Blonde Ladies

18. Clear Signal From Cairo – 1:37
19. I'm Gonna Run – 2:26
20. Here Comes the Summer – 3:15
21. Chief Inspector Blancheflower – 2:31
22. Automatic Husband – 1:38
23. Ex-Guru – 2:34
24. Clear Signal From Cairo (Reprise) – 1:39
25. Philadelphia Grand Jury – 1:13
26. Navy Nurse – 0:59
27. Uncle Charlie – 2:17

== Additional information ==
Instead of displaying the full track listing, the album contains only a listing of the six suites:

1. Old HK
2. Waiting at the Lobby at 665½ Frontage Road
3. In a House Once Owned by the Princes of Mataran
4. Drinking by the Des Plaines River
5. Black Death Bottle
6. A Special Commission of Navajo Basketball Coaches and Blonde Ladies

The packaging includes a small paper insert titled "Remember Treasure Hunt" that proposes that the listener write down guesses of the track listing, before and after listening to the album.

== Personnel ==
- Matthew Friedberger - Vocals, guitar, keyboards
- Eleanor Friedberger - Vocals, guitar
- Jason Loewenstein - Bass, guitar
- Bob D'Amico - Drums
- Michael Goodman - Percussion
