= In Between Stars =

Song by American singer Eleanor Friedberger

Single by Eleanor Friedberger

from the album Rebound
- Released: February 14, 2018
- Recorded: 2017
- Genre: pop
- Length: 3:29
- Label: Frenchkiss
- Songwriter: Friedberger
- Producers: Friedberger; Clemens Knieper

Eleanor Friedberger singles chronology
"Sweetest Girl" (2016)	"In Between Stars" (2018)	"Everything" (2018)

"In Between Stars" is a song by American singer-songwriter Eleanor Friedberger. It was released on February 14, 2018, as the lead single from her fourth studio album, Rebound.

The song, which is lyrically ambiguous and includes Greek mythology-inspired metaphors, marked a stylistic departure for Friedberger, in that it relied more on synthesizers and less on guitars than previous releases. An accompanying music video, released in March 2018, depicted Friedberger driving through a desert and dancing. Upon its release, the song drew favorable reviews from critics, who noted the song’s final lyrics as a highlight and praised its production.

== Background ==
In 2016, Friedberger had released her third studio album, New View; the following year, she took a trip to Athens, Greece, to reconnect with her Greek heritage and get inspiration for her fourth studio album. While there, on the recommendation of a Greek musician friend, she visited a nightclub called Rebound which her friend described as an "‘80s goth disco" and which played music reminiscent of Joy Division and the Cure. Following her visit to Greece, Friedberger began writing music for the album, including "In Between Stars."

Friedberger had at first written "In Between Stars" as a piano ballad; she played a demo for Bradford Cox, a friend and member of the group Deerhunter, who, Friedberger told Consequence of Sound, informed her that the song "doesn’t need to go anywhere [....] This is not interesting at all." Friedberger disagreed, and instead altered the song’s arrangement to be more "synth-heavy."

For the lyrics, Friedberger was inspired by a book of Greek mythology she’d been given by a friend as a Christmas gift. She told Consequence of Sound that she had "been feeling a larger, mythic connection to Greece [...] since my early twenties, and my recent trip just made it even deeper."

== Composition ==
"In Between Stars" is three minutes and twenty-nine seconds long, written in the key of C Major and with a tempo of 110 beats per minute. The song’s production marked a departure for Friedberger in that, whereas on New View she had recorded with her touring band, "In Between Stars" consists mostly of solo performance, with production by Clemens Knieper. It includes a Juno synthesizer, drum machines, and guitars. Uproxx described the song as sounding "ethereal." In a single review for DIY, critic Eugenie Johnson observed that, although the song is less centered on guitars than much of Friedberger’s previous work, "jagged [guitar] riffs pierc[e] through the mix." A writer for the Phoenix New Times, meanwhile, likened the song’s production to that of Giorgio Moroder’s early 1980s work. An album review for Spin noted that the song "initially suggests itself to be" a pop anthem, but ultimately "decomposes rather than culminates," with a "rude, blaring guitar" and "tinny handclaps" in the middle and at the end, respectively.

The song’s lyrics have been described as "evocative but ambiguous metaphors," and as containing a "sing-song refrain." An album review by Tiny Mix Tapes described the lyrics as "quasi mythological." The final lines of the song — "I don’t know how I’ve come to see the world exclusively through your eyes/ Everything I buy and eat and do with you in mind" — were highlighted by numerous critics as a highlight of the song.

== Release ==
The song was released on February 14, 2018, along with the announcement that Friedberger’s new album, Rebound, would be released in May, and a list of United States and United Kingdom tour dates slated for between February and May 2018; several were appearances as the opening act for The Decemberists. In an accompanying press release, Friedberger described the Athenian club which ultimately became the namesake of the album, quoting a Greek friend who described the club as "kind of an 80s goth disco where everyone does the chicken dance [...] but it’s only open on Saturdays after 3:00 AM."

== Music video ==
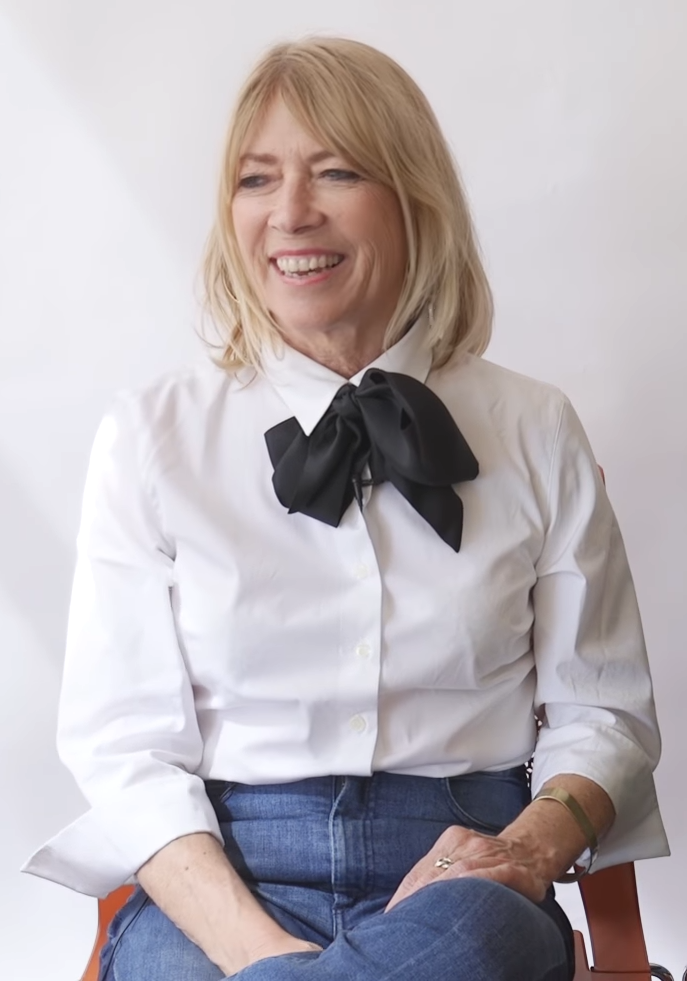
Rock singer-songwriter Kim Gordon (above) helped Friedberger to film the music video for the single.

On March 7, 2018, Friedberger released the official music video for "In Between Stars." It depicts Friedberger driving and walking through a desert, dancing, and singing to herself. The video employs effects to resemble a "retro VHS." Paste magazine described the video as "super L.A."

The video was shot by Friedberger herself and edited by Los Angeles videographer Danny Perez. Friedberger was inspired to recruit Perez to edit the video after she saw and was impressed by his work for Body/Head and Bjorn Copeland, in particular praising the analog feedback and bright colors characteristic of his work, which she felt "fit the mood of Rebound perfectly." While filming the video, Friedberger received encouragement from Kim Gordon; she had initially asked Gordon to direct the video herself, but after Gordon declined (citing her busy schedule), she helped Friedberger to film the video on an iPhone.

== Critical reception ==
In a review for Pitchfork upon the single’s release, critic Marc Hogan deemed the song "coolly poised" and opined that it feels "at once intimate and somewhat mysterious;" he concluded that "It’s still worth seeing the world for awhile through her view." A single review by DIY, written by Eugenie Johnson, deemed the song "a strident, confident return." An album review for the Chicago Tribune described the song as "gently buoyant."

== Track listing ==
Digital download

1. "In Between Stars" — 3:29

Demos from Rebound Redux

1. "In Between Stars 1" — 3:41
2. "In Between Stars 2" — 3:27
3. "In Between Stars 3" — 3:51

== Personnel ==
Adapted from Rebound liner notes and reviews

- Eleanor Friedberger — vocals, Juno synthesizer, drum machines, guitars
- Clem Knieper — production
