= Rebound (Eleanor Friedberger album) =

Studio album by Eleanor Friedberger
- Released: May 4, 2018
- Genres: Soft rock; pop
- Length: 40:05
- Label: Frenchkiss
- Producers: Eleanor Friedberger, Clemens Knieper

Eleanor Friedberger chronology
| New View (2016) | Rebound (2018) |

Singles from Rebound
- 1. "In Between Stars" Released: February 14, 2018; 2. "Everything" Released: April 20, 2018

Rebound is the fourth solo studio album by American singer-songwriter Eleanor Friedberger. It was released on May 4, 2018, by Frenchkiss Records. Friedberger had been inspired to write the album following a 2017 trip to Athens, Greece, where she visited a nightclub called Rebound. The album marked a stylistic departure for Friedberger, with synthesizers and drum machines replacing the live bands on her previous albums. Two singles — lead single "In Between Stars" and "Everything" — were released prior to the album, in addition to one promotional song, "Make Me a Song".

Upon its release, the album drew acclaim from music critics, who praised both its production and songwriting. It also became Friedberger's fourth solo studio album to peak within the top 20 of the US Heatseekers Albums chart.

== Background ==
In 2016, Friedberger released her third solo studio album, New View. In January 2017, following the album's release and the results of the 2016 United States presidential election, Friedberger travelled to Greece to "reconnect with her heritage", being half-Greek, and experience the Greek music world. Friedberger told the Phoenix New Times that one reason she was drawn to Athens was that she regretted having moved to New York City in 2000 and not experiencing an earlier incarnation of the city; she felt that Athens had retained a pre-2000 New York feeling.

While in Athens, on the advice of Σtella, a Greek musician, Friedberger visited a goth nightclub named Rebound, which ultimately became the namesake for her fourth studio album. An acquaintance had described the club to her as "an '80s goth disco where everyone does the chicken dance;" the music played at the club was compared to Joy Division and the Cure. Ultimately, Friedberger would make the club the setting of her song "It's Hard". In a press release announcing the album's release date, Friedberger further noted that the club was open only on Saturdays after 3 AM, and described the club as both "alienating and exhilarating".

== Composition ==
=== Musical style ===
Rebound has been noted for being more pop-oriented and less rock-oriented than Friedberger's previous work. Whereas Friedberger's previous albums employed a live band, much of Rebound is built on a keyboard, drawing comparisons to 1980s pop. However, Pitchfork writer Jonah Bromwich argued that the stylistic "shift on Rebound isn't seismic". The Chicago Tribune observed that "guitars play a critical role" in many of the album's compositions, while The Independent concluded that "Rebound isn't a guitar-driven album". The album drew stylistic comparisons to Julia Holter, Carly Simon, Laurie Anderson, Yellow Magic Orchestra, and Stereolab. The Guardian compared Friedberger's vocals to those of Sparks's Russell Mael.

"My Jesus Phase" employs synthesizers and a rhythm guitar. Both "My Jesus Phase" and "Make Me a Song" have been described as having "bubbling bass lines". "Everything" was described by Bromwich as "one of the danciest songs she's ever recorded", while the Chicago Tribune deemed it to be an outright pop song. The A.V. Club noted that the song employs keyboards to serve as "de facto backup vocals". MusicOMH compared the song's style to that of Fleetwood Mac's Tango in the Night. Both "Everything" and "Make Me a Song" were classified as electro-pop. "In Between Stars," which includes synthesizer chords and "a central sing-song refrain", has been described as initially sounding like a "pop anthem", but ultimately showing itself to be one of the album's "stranger compositions", eventually incorporating a distorted guitar and hand-claps. Friedberger called the song her "homage to dark '80s pop", with The Guardian singling out the Eurythmics and Berlin as possible influences. MusicOMH compared the song's guitars to those of Lindsey Buckingham. The song also drew comparison to Texas. "Make Me a Song" was described by Stereogum as "rockabilly-esque". "It's Hard" employs "a creaky rhythm" and "seesaw synths." An album review by PopMatters compared its lead guitar to those of Mike Oldfield and Robert Fripp.

=== Lyrics ===
The first lines of "My Jesus Phase", the album's opening track, are "Let me forget the words/Let me forget the time". In the song, Friedberger compares her difficulty in following the plot of Iris Murdoch's novel The Nice and the Good to the disorientation "of our collective moral compass after the 2016 election". Pitchfork deemed its lyric to be akin to a Rachel Cusk novel, likening it to "a mosaic of fragments". In "The Letter", Friedberger expresses regret over an unsuccessful relationship carried out by mail. In it, Friedberger recounts an episode in which she found some pills on the roadside, took them, and ended up "lying prone on a wharf". It includes the lyric "When the pain ended I won a prize"; Bromwich argued that the line could be interpreted either literally or figuratively. "Everything" has been described as both defiant and containing ennui, and describes a woman who wants both "a man in Greece, a girlfriend in Italy". It examines a number of topics, and includes a spoken-word portion when Friedberger wryly says "I mean two houses, please." Friedberger told Consequence of Sound that the song, in particular the line about the boyfriend and girlfriend, was inspired by an Athenian friend who was "really struggling" to decide whether she wanted to have children and lead a conventional life, or to continue her work as an experimental actress. She also said that the song is about "wanting to have it all, and how that's ridiculous".

"In Between Stars" was described as "forlorn-sounding" and suggesting "clouded judgment" on the part of Friedberger, with the lines "I don't know how I've come to see the world/Exclusively through your eyes/Everything I buy and eat and do with you in mind" being singled out by numerous critics as notable. The song's lyric has also been described as describing Friedberger's "transformation among the blinding lights of an Athenian dancefloor". Friedberger told Consequence of Sound that the song's lyrics were inspired partly by a book of Greek mythology she'd received as a gift.

In "Make Me a Song", Friedberger sings that music is a way to "open up the ground". Friedberger wrote the song after a conversation with a born-again Christian in Greece who told her that he was inspired by his love of Jesus to write songs. Friedberger was inspired to write a song in which she examined music as if it were a religion; she at first attempted to write a hymn, but later decided instead to write what the New Times described as "a song that everyone could enjoy." Its refrain is the line "I could love you more", while its hook includes the lyric "It takes the ear/ To hear the waves/ And the heart/ To know you feel some feeling."

The song "It's Hard" is set at Rebound, the Athenian club. In that song, she describes the club as a place "where time stands still". Friedberger describes the club's music with the lyric "sound familiar, but it's not the Cure". She stated that she had initially planned to write the song as if it were for a fake television show akin to Twin Peaks or Black Mirror, but that she also wanted to include details specific to Rebound. The song includes a line about a telephone number that got torn up in a washing machine; Friedberger noted that that line was inspired by the line "Please don't lose my number" in a song by Huw Evans, and her revelation that "now it's impossible to lose someone's phone number".

For the lyrics of "Are We Good", Friedberger transcribed the text messages of three people with whom she'd had relationships, then set them to song; she also noted that many of the text messages included in the lyrics had been written by her. Friedberger describes accidentally killing snakes while mowing her lawn and a dog who "isn't even barking in the right language". Friedberger told Consequence of Sound that the line "I'll go to ZZ Top and lose my mind" was taken from an exchange with a friend in Texas who was a big fan of the group. The song also includes the lyric "I proposed to a woman for a man last night", which Bromwich considered to be a continuation of the Grecian boyfriend and Italian girlfriend theme examined in "Everything". The song's lyrics were regarded as reminiscent of those of Friedberger's former group, the Fiery Furnaces. The chorus of the song consists of Friedberger repeating the title, as if taken from a text message.

Friedberger wrote the lyrics of "Showy Early Spring" for a friend; she noted that, unusually, she cried while she was writing it. Greg Kot, writing for the Chicago Tribune, described the song as attempting to answer the question "Is that all there is?" Friedberger concludes that everything that people could want or need is "here for the taking".

== Release ==
On May 3, 2018, one day before the album's official release, Friedberger premiered the full album on Consequence of Sound's website, and provided commentary on each song on the album. The following day, the album received its official release by Frenchkiss Records; it was made available as both a CD and an LP.

Friedberger released Rebound Redux, a collection of demos from the Rebound sessions, on May 1, 2020, via Bandcamp.

=== Singles ===
"In Between Stars" was released as the album's first single on February 14, 2018, to coincide with an announcement of the May 4, 2018, release of Rebound and a list of upcoming tour dates, some solo and others with the Decemberists. On March 7, 2018, Friedberger premiered the official music video for the single; she had filmed it herself, and enlisted videographer Danny Perez to edit it. The video depicts Friedberger driving and walking through a desert, and employs analog feedback effects.

On April 3, 2018, Friedberger released "Make Me a Song" with an accompanying music video. The video, which was shot in black-and-white and directed by Scott Jacobson, depicts Friedberger engaging in "self-care rituals," including going for a morning jog, climbing a mountain, swimming, and receiving a visit from a "no-touch" spiritual healer.

"Everything" was released as the second official single from the album on April 20, 2018. On May 10, 2018, Friedberger released the song's official music video; it was directed by Jonah Freud and shows Friedberger in an "eclectically decorated studio" having her hair cut, "mixing paint, and playing with food." Freud cited ASMR videos and the "absurdity of tutorial culture" as influences for the video. Accompanying the video was a list of further tour dates.

== Reception ==
=== Critical ===
Professional ratings
Aggregate scores
| Source | Rating |
|---|---|
| Metacritic | 84/100 |
Review scores
| Source | Rating |
| AllMusic | 4/5 stars |
| The A.V. Club | B+ |
| Chicago Tribune | 3.5/4 stars |
| The Guardian | 4/5 stars |
| The Independent | 4/5 stars |
| Mojo | 5/5 stars |
| Pitchfork | 8.1/10 |
| PopMatters | 5/10 stars |
| Under the Radar | 4.5/10 stars |

Upon its release, the album drew acclaim from contemporary music critics. On the review aggregator Metacritic, the album holds a score of 84 out of 100, indicating "universal acclaim".

The Skinny awarded the album four out of five stars; critic Chris Ogden singled out "Everything", "Make Me a Song" and "Nice to Be Nowhere" as highlights, praised her "quirky songwriting", and concluded that Friedberger "remains one of indie rock's masters".

==== Accolades ====
In July 2018, Metacritic ranked Rebound at number 23 on their list of "The 25 Best Albums of 2018 so far", deeming it her best solo album to date and commending her for "ditching the full-band sound of her prior album". At the end of 2018, AllMusic featured the album on their list of "Favorite Singer/Songwriter Albums", praising the album as including "some of her most surprising and engaging songs".

=== Commercial ===
In the United States, on the Billboard Heatseekers Albums chart dated May 19, 2018, Rebound debuted and peaked at number 20, becoming Friedberger's fourth solo album to peak within that chart's top 20.

== Track listing ==
All songs written by Eleanor Friedberger.

1. "My Jesus Phase" — 3:46
2. "The Letter" — 3:48
3. "Everything" — 3:51
4. "In Between Stars" — 3:29
5. "Make Me a Song" — 5:32
6. "Nice to Be Nowhere" — 4:51
7. "It's Hard" — 3:35
8. "Are We Good?" — 3:52
9. "Showy Early Spring" — 2:55
10. "Rule of Action" — 4:26

== Charts ==
| Chart (2018) | Peak position |
|---|---|
| US Heatseekers Albums | 20 |
