= Last Summer (album) =

Studio album by Eleanor Friedberger
- Released: July 12, 2011
- Recorded: August–November 2010 at Stickydisc Recording in Brooklyn
- Genre: Indie pop
- Length: 39:33
- Label: Merge
- Producer: Eric Broucek

Eleanor Friedberger chronology
| Last Summer (2011) | Personal Record (2013) |

Professional ratings
Review scores
| Source | Rating |
|---|---|
| AllMusic | 4/5 stars |
| The A.V. Club | (B+) |
| Drowned in Sound | (7/10) |
| The Guardian | 4/5 stars |
| NME | (8/10) |
| Pitchfork | (7.9/10) |
| Tiny Mix Tapes | 3.5/5 marks |
| Sputnikmusic | 3.5/5 stars |
| Paste | (8.2/10) |
| MusicOMH | 4/5 stars |
| PopMatters | (8/10) |
| Spin | (8/10) |
| Consequence of Sound | 4/5 stars |

Last Summer is the first solo album released by American indie pop musician Eleanor Friedberger, most notable for being the vocalist in the band The Fiery Furnaces with her brother Matthew Friedberger. The album was released on 12 July 2011 on the Merge Records record label.

The album was announced as being in the making in April 2011 and released on July 12, 2011. Last Summer currently holds a 79 out of 100 rating on Metacritic.

== Track listing ==
| No. | Title | Length |
|---|---|---|
| 1. | "My Mistakes" | 4:29 |
| 2. | "Inn of the Seventh Ray" | 4:08 |
| 3. | "Heaven" | 3:21 |
| 4. | "Scenes from Bensonhurst" | 4:33 |
| 5. | "Roosevelt Island" | 5:20 |
| 6. | "Glitter Gold Year" | 2:48 |
| 7. | "One-Month Marathon" | 3:36 |
| 8. | "I Won't Fall Apart on You Tonight" | 3:39 |
| 9. | "Owl's Head Park" | 4:31 |
| 10. | "Early Earthquake" | 3:14 |

== Personnel ==
=== Band Members ===
- Eric Broucek – Bass, Guitar, Keyboard, Percussion
- Eleanor Friedberger – Guitar, Harmonica, Keyboard, Percussion, Vocals
- Dylan Heaney – Tenor Saxophone
- Jim Orso – Drums
- Phil Rodriguez – Trumpet
- Tim Traynor – Drums
- Morgan Wiley – Keyboard

=== Technical ===
- Eric Broucek – Producer, Engineering, and Mixing
- Joe Lambert – Mastering
- Michael Rubenstein – Cover Photography
- Rebecca Benga – Back Cover Photography
- Beth Lieberman – Photography
- Maggie Fost – Design
