= New View =

New View may refer to:

- The New View, published by the Socialist Party, State of New Jersey

== Albums ==
- New View (Eleanor Friedberger album), a 2016 album by American indie rock musician Eleanor Friedberger
- New View! (John Handy album), a 1967 live album by saxophonist John Handy and his quintet
- New View, album by Chris Laurence (2007)

== Songs ==
- "New View" by Tim Ries Quintet Composed by Tim Ries
- "New View" by Robert Lucas (musician) Composed by Robert Lucas
