= Eleanor Friedberger =

American singer-songwriter (born 1976)

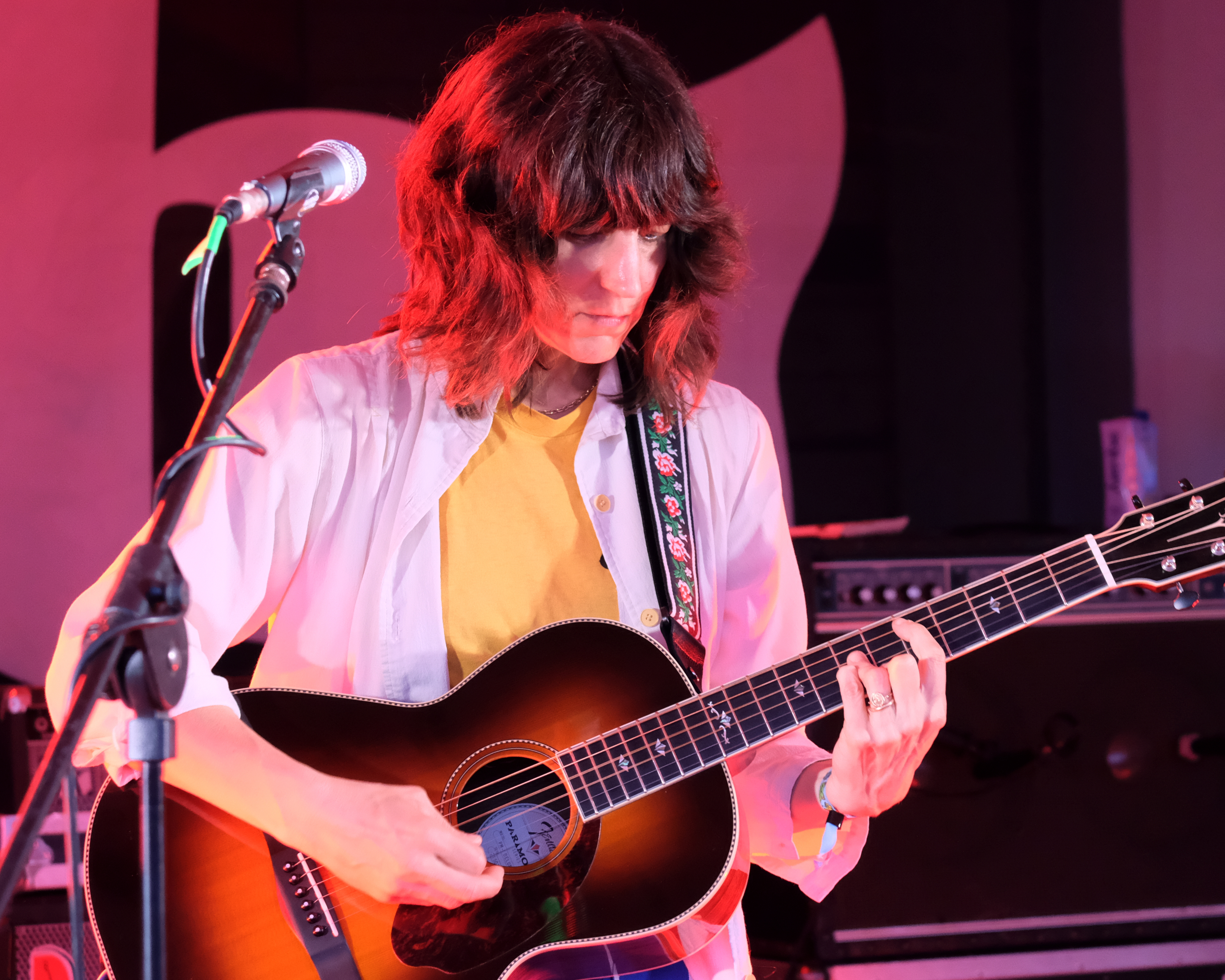
- Eleanor Friedberger (2025)

Background information
- Born: September 2, 1976 (age 49)
- Origin: Oak Park, Illinois
- Genres: Indie rock
- Occupations: Singer, songwriter, musician
- Instruments: Vocals, guitar, keyboards
- Years active: 2000–present
- Labels: Merge Records, Frenchkiss Records

Eleanor Friedberger (born September 2, 1976) is an American singer, songwriter and multi-instrumentalist. She is best known as one half of the indie rock duo The Fiery Furnaces, alongside her older brother Matthew Friedberger. In the band she contributes the majority of the vocals both on record and during their live performances.

In 2011, The Fiery Furnaces went on hiatus, with both Friedberger siblings embarking upon solo careers. To date, Friedberger has released four solo studio albums: Last Summer (2011), Personal Record (2013), New View (2016) and Rebound (2018), all four of which have peaked in the top 20 of the Billboard Heatseekers Albums chart.

== Early life ==
Friedberger was born in Oak Park, Illinois, and grew up singing with her grandmother Olga Sarantos and family in a Greek Orthodox church.

== Solo work ==
=== 2011–2012: Last Summer ===
Friedberger released her first solo album Last Summer on July 12, 2011, through Merge Records; the record was classified as "experimental pop." The album elicited generally favorable reviews from music critics, and entered the Billboard Heatseekers Albums chart, on which it ultimately attained a peak of number 20.

=== 2013–2015: Personal Record ===
Friedberger released her second album, Personal Record, on June 4, 2013. The album peaked at number 9 on the Billboard Heatseekers Albums chart, becoming her first top ten entry; it also peaked at number 43 on the Independent Albums chart.

=== 2016: New View ===
Following the release of Personal Record, Friedberger moved from New York City to upstate New York; the experience inspired her while she was writing and recording her third studio album. Her third album, New View, was released on January 22, 2016. It is her first release on Frenchkiss Records, having released her first two albums through Merge Records. The album peaked at number 16 on the Billboard Heatseekers Albums chart, and also became her highest-peaking entry on the US Independent Albums chart, where it attained a peak of number 34.

=== 2017–present: Rebound ===
In January 2017, after the results of the 2016 United States presidential election and her tour in support of New View, Friedberger took a trip to Athens, Greece, out of a desire to reconnect with her Greek heritage and to explore the Greek music scene. While there, on the recommendation of a friend, she visited an '80s-themed goth nightclub called Rebound, which made an impression on her and ultimately became the namesake of her fourth studio album. For Rebound, Friedberger adopted a more pop-influenced sound, recording most of the music herself and using synthesizers and drum machines as opposed to the live bands which characterized her earlier solo work.

On February 14, 2018, Friedberger announced that Rebound would be released on May 4; in conjunction with the announcement, she released the lead single from the project, titled "In Between Stars;" several weeks later, she released an accompanying music video, which she had filmed herself with assistance from former Sonic Youth frontwoman Kim Gordon. On April 20, 2018, "Everything" was released as the second single from the album, ahead of its release; an accompanying music video was directed by Jonah Freud.

On May 4, 2018, Rebound was released by Frenchkiss Records. The album drew universal acclaim from music critics, who noted Friedberger's stylistic departure. It became Friedberger's fourth consecutive top-twenty entry on the Billboard Heatseekers Albums chart, where it peaked at number 20.

== Personal life ==
Friedberger's brother Matthew dedicated his 2006 solo album, Winter Women, to her.

She has dated both Britt Daniel of Spoon and Alex Kapranos of the Scottish rock band Franz Ferdinand. The Spoon song "Anything You Want" and the Franz Ferdinand song "Eleanor Put Your Boots On" are both written about her. She attended the University of Texas at Austin, where Daniel was her classmate.

== Discography ==
Solo albums

- Last Summer (2011)
- Personal Record (2013)
- New View (2016)
- Rebound (2018)

with The Fiery Furnaces

- Gallowsbird's Bark (2003)
- Blueberry Boat (2004)
- EP (2005)
- Rehearsing My Choir (2005)
- Bitter Tea (2006)
- Widow City (2007)
- Remember - Double live album (2008)
- I'm Going Away (2009)
- Take Me Round Again (2009)
- Stuck In My Head (2024)
