= My Mistake =

My Mistake may refer to:

- "My Mistake (Was to Love You)", a 1974 song by Diana Ross and Marvin Gaye
- "My Mistake" (Gabrielle Aplin song), 2018
- "My Mistake" (Cam song), 2015
- "My Mistake" (Split Enz song), 1977
- "My Mistake", a 1968 song by Canned Heat, from the album Living the Blues
- "My Mistake", a 2023 song by Kelly Clarkson from Chemistry
- "My Mistake", a song by the Kingbees, later covered in 1980 by Jamie James
- "My Mistake", a 2019 song by Vampire Weekend, from the album Father of the Bride

== See also ==
- "My Mistakes" (Wiley song), 2007
- "My Mistakes" (Eleanor Friedberger song), 2011
- Mea culpa, Latin phrase meaning my mistake
