= Stuck in My Head (album) =

Studio album by The Fiery Furnaces
- Released: October 4, 2024
- Recorded: November 12, 2021
- Studio: Figure 8 Recording, Brooklyn
- Genre: Indie rock
- Length: 67:04

The Fiery Furnaces chronology
Take Me Round Again (2009)	Stuck in My Head (2024)

Stuck in My Head is The Fiery Furnaces' ninth album. It was released as a Bandcamp exclusive on October 4, 2024. Stuck in My Head is the first release the band has released in 15 years—having last released in 2009.

== Production ==
Stuck in My Head was recorded live on November 12, 2021 at Figure 8 Recording in Brooklyn with no overdubs. It contains twenty tracks spanning The Fiery Furnaces' entire career.

Fluxblog called the album "essentially a live-in-studio recording of the band’s 2021 reunion tour show".

This was the band's first full length album in 15 years, and followed their comeback single "Down At the So and So on Somewhere" released June 18, 2020 on Third Man Records. The single marked their first new music in nearly a decade, following a hiatus that began in 2011.

== Track listing ==
No.	Title	Length
1.	"My Dog Was Lost But Now He's Found"	3:54
2.	"The Garfield El"	4:30
3.	"Leaky Tunnel"	2:00
4.	"Single Again"	3:09
5.	"Two Fat Feet"	4:10
6.	"I'm Going Away"	1:56
7.	"Benton Harbor Blues"	3:40
8.	"Chief Inspector Blancheflower"	1:55
9.	"I'm In No Mood"	6:38
10.	"Don't Dance Her Down"	3:13
11.	"The Vietnamese Telephone Ministry"	4:02
12.	"Down At The So And So On Somewhere"	4:01
13.	"Duplexes Of The Dead"	2:20
14.	"Automatic Husband"	2:06
15.	"Ex-Guru"	2:09
16.	"Quay Cur"	6:38
17.	"Tropical Ice-Land'	1:52
18.	"Here Comes The Summer"	3:11
19.	"My Egyptian Grammar"	2:16
20.	"Chris Michaels"	6:48

== Personnel ==
- Eleanor Friedberger - Vocals
- Matthew Friedberger - Mono synths 1, 2, and 3, DX7 polysynth, Sequencer
- Emily Lee - DX7 piano, Clavinet, Juno 6
- Brian Betancourt - Bass guitar
- Noah Hecht - Drum kit
- Cameron Wisch - Drum kit
- Jonathan Schenke - Mixing and Mastering
