= Winter Women and Holy Ghost Language School =

Winter Women/Holy Ghost Language School

Studio album by Matthew Friedberger
- Released: 8 August 2006
- Recorded: 2005/2006
- Genre: Indie rock
- Length: 108:53
- Labels: 859 Recordings, Thrill Jockey (2009 reissue)
- Producers: Matthew Friedberger, Bill Skibbe

Alternative cover
- 2009 Reissue on Thrill Jockey

Professional ratings
Review scores
Source	Rating
Allmusic	3.5/5 stars
Pitchfork Media	(5.0/10)
The A.V. Club	(B/C-)
Rolling Stone	3/5 stars

Winter Women and Holy Ghost Language School are two albums by Matthew Friedberger of The Fiery Furnaces recorded, unlike The Fiery Furnaces records, without his sister Eleanor Friedberger. Though two separate albums, they were released together as a double album by 859 Recordings in August 2006. It was rereleased in October 2009 on Thrill Jockey.

== Track listing ==
Winter Women – 62:44

1. "Under the Hood at the Paradise Garage" – 4:06
2. "The Pennsylvania Rock Oil Co. Resignation Letter" – 3:43
3. "Up the River" – 4:29
4. "Ruth vs. Richard" – 2:51
5. "Her Chinese Typewriter" – 4:21
6. "Big Bill Crib and His Ladies of the Desert" – 3:21
7. "Don't You Remember?" – 3:45
8. "Becha Don’t" – 2:54
9. "P.S. 213 Mini"-School – 3:54
10. "Theme from Never Going Home Again" – 2:44
11. "Motorman" – 5:58
12. "Quick as Cupid" – 3:47
13. "I Love You Cedric" – 4:39
14. "Servant in Distress" – 3:28
15. "Hialeah" – 2:56
16. "Wisconsin River Blues" – 5:40

Bonus Tracks from 2009 rerelease-

1. "Rio Tinto" - 3:50
2. "260 Northern Blvd." - 3:02

Holy Ghost Language School – 46:09

1. Seventh Loop Highway – 3:57
2. Holy Ghost Language School – 4:13
3. The Cross and the Switchblade – 3:54
4. I Started Using Alcohol at the Age of Eleven – 3:57
5. Do You Like Blondes? – 2:50
6. Azusa St. – 4:24
7. Topeka and San Antonio – 3:40
8. A Mystical Preparative to Lewdness – 2:47
9. Ship Scrap Beach Business – 2:18
10. First Day of School – 2:50
11. Things Were Going So Well – 4:07
12. All in Vain or the Opposite – 5:05
13. Moral and Epilogue – 2:00

Bonus Tracks from 2009 rerelease-

1. "Rain" - 12:43
2. "Porcupine Posed a Prickly Problem" - 11:53

== Additional information ==
Despite the solo albums The Fiery Furnaces will continue releasing new material as a group. When asked by Pitchfork about the reason for them being recorded/released separately Matthew, who writes most of the music and lyrics for The Fiery Furnaces responded with:

"Eleanor's on vacation, We have a logjam of records, so [this is] the only way to have something come out relatively quickly. And I don't have to bother Eleanor to get her to sing all this crap, so...that's the advantage. It's an act of mercy."

Winter Women is also stated in the liner notes as being dedicated to Eleanor.

While Winter Women is a more conventional collection of songs, the second record Holy Ghost Language School is a narrative-based concept album, although it has significantly fewer lyrics.

Matthew Friedberger played the majority of the instruments on the records and did most of the production work but John McEntire from Tortoise and Josh Johannpeter from Mahjongg helped out by providing some of the non-synthesized drums.
