= Solos (Matthew Friedberger album) =

Box set by Matthew Friedberger
- Released: 2011
- Recorded: 2010/2011
- Genre: Indie rock
- Length: 307:07
- Label: Thrill Jockey
- Producer: Matthew Friedberger

Solos is a vinyl-only boxset of six albums by Chicago-based musician Matthew Friedberger of The Fiery Furnaces. On each of the six records, Matthew only plays one instrument, hence the name Solos. The boxset was released by Thrill Jockey records as a subscription series in 2011, with two bonus albums for subscribers, although small quantities of each album were released individually.

== Track listing ==
Napoléonette – 39:38

1. Hey Chief – 3:34
2. Shirley – 3:00
3. What A Weird Weird Weird Weird – 6:04
4. St. Giles Parish – 5:59
5. Napoléonette – 3:50
6. Courteous And Orderly – 2:44
7. I'll Ride Right Up On My Mule – 3:57
8. I Had An Old-Fashioned – 3:15
9. Oh The Hell Of It – 3:56
10. North To... – 3:18

This album features only the piano.

Meet Me in Miramas – 42:49

1. The Sainte-Barbe Triangle – 4:00
2. Meet Me In Miramas – 4:23
3. But Seriously, Why Did You Do It? – 8:58
4. The Diabolical Principle – 4:27
5. Different Dads – 8:09
6. I Met The Queen Of The Night In The Daytime – 2:48
7. If... – 6:20
8. The City Of The Sun – 3:46

This album features only the guitar.

Old Regimes – 43:49

1. The Hidden Location Of My Purple Pen – 10:12
2. Quality Evictions Since 1986 – 4:27
3. Rebeccaism – 4:47
4. She's Relieved, Actually – 4:09
5. Ticket-A-Dance – 4:51
6. Attis – 7:16
7. The Xlebnikov Branding And Wayfinding Agency – 7:48

This album features only a Lyon & Healy semi-grand harp.

Cut It Out – 33:19

1. I'm So Happy I Could Scream, She Whispered – 5:01
2. Finding Love In A Highly Confidential, Custom Tailored And Focused Manner – 4:48
3. The So-Called Commission To Promote Vice And Combat Virtue – 5:55
4. Actress Or Prostitute, Or Actress/Prostitute, Blues – 4:50
5. Call, Click Or Come – 4:47
6. Cut It Out – 4:30
7. The Comforts Of The Coffin – 3:34

This album features only a drum-set and drum machines.

Death-In-Life – 40:39

1. A Sensational Caprice 3:56
2. Katie Did And Katie Didn't 5:44
3. Dark And Day 2:10
4. Anniversary Quick Step 5:42
5. Katie Did And Katie Didn't 2:45
6. Away Down West 4:28
7. In The Days 5:07
8. My Best Treasure 4:29
9. Annie Laurie Or Laurie Annie 2:06
10. Call Me Pet Names 4:47

This album features only an organ.

Arrested On Charges of Unemployment – 34:34

1. One – 4:11
2. Two – 5:14
3. Three – 2:53
4. Four – 3:12
5. Five – 1:40
6. Five (Continued) – 2:13
7. Six – 4:16
8. Seven – 4:50
9. Eight – 2:54
10. Nine – 3:16

This album features only a double up-right bass.

Bonus record #1: Artemisia – 31:14

1. Coyote – 3:13
2. Mr. Dunbar Among The Pawnee – 4:28
3. Working In The Mine – 3:32
4. Figures – 4:40
5. Decoction Of Artemisia – 3:50
6. Your Best Girl Is Back In London – 3:22
7. Serpent, Say – 4:46
8. Bring It To Me – 3:32

Unlike the other albums, this albums features a multitude of instruments.

Bonus record #2: Good-Bye Forever – 41:05

1. July The First – 5:34
2. Especially So – 6:22
3. Done And Double – 5:46
4. Back At Napo's – 0:53
5. Christmas In July – 1:37
6. Greyhound – 2:18
7. The Althea Gibson/Robert Kennedy Middle School Orchestra, Mov. 1: The Darkness Of The Dawn – 5:56
8. The AG/RK MSO, Mov. 2: The Middle Of The Morning – 1:38
9. The AG/RK MSO, Mov. 3: When We Were Friends – 4:42
10. The AG/RK MSO, Mov. 4: Goodbye Forever – 6:14

This album features only the piano and electric piano. It is entirely instrumental.

== The Diabolical Principle ==
In 2012, Thrill Jockey released a digital compilation of material from the Solos series. The album consists of four long tracks that have material from the eight albums spliced together.

The Diabolical Principle – 88:27

1. The Daughter He Has for Years Dreamed of Punishing – 20:32
2. Damn It – 20:11
3. Long Live the Other One – 22:01
4. Implement Lost – 25:44
