= Take Me Round Again =

Studio album by The Fiery Furnaces
- Released: November 2009 (online)
- Recorded: July 2009
- Genre: Indie rock
- Length: 41:18
- Label: Thrill Jockey

The Fiery Furnaces chronology
| I'm Going Away (2009) | Take Me Round Again (2009) | Stuck in My Head (2024) |

Take Me Round Again is The Fiery Furnaces' eighth album. It was first released, in MP3 format, through Thrill Jockey Records, in November 2009. The album is being described as "The Friedbergers cover the Friedbergers," in reference to core members and siblings, Matthew and Eleanor Friedberger.

== Production ==
Recorded separately in Michigan and New York, Matt and Eleanor each recorded six songs that originally appeared on I'm Going Away. The tracks represent a reworked, rearranged, rewritten versions of the songs. According to the record's page at the Thrill Jockey website, "All that remains the same are the words."

While Matthew described the album as an "alternative version of the record," Eleanor explained:

“I’ve gotten into the habit of rewriting songs Matt has written, just as a way of practicing and singing at home. Originally, I had wanted to record a folk-style record called Eleanor Friedberger sings the songs of the Fiery Furnaces. I thought it would make a nice greatest hits record, but reworking I’m Going Away before it even came out seemed a lot more exciting.”

== Track listing ==
1. "I'm Going Away" - Matthew (4:18)
2. "I'm Going Away" - Eleanor (5:06)
3. "Keep Me in the Dark" - Eleanor (2:07)
4. "Cut the Cake" - Eleanor (3:46)
5. "Even in the Rain" - Eleanor (1:56)
6. "Drive to Dallas" - Matthew (0:54)
7. "Keep Me in the Dark" - Matthew (3:32)
8. "Ray Bouvier" - Eleanor (2:25)
9. "Cups + Punches" - Eleanor (3:37)
10. "Take Me Round Again" - Matthew (5:33)
11. "Cut the Cake" - Matthew (4:30)
12. "Staring at the Steeple" - Matthew (3:34)
