= EP (The Fiery Furnaces album) =

Compilation album by The Fiery Furnaces
- Released: January 11, 2005
- Recorded: 2003–2004
- Genre: Indie rock
- Length: 41:03
- Label: Rough Trade
- Producers: Matthew Friedberger, Nicolas Vernhes

The Fiery Furnaces chronology
Blueberry Boat (2004)	EP (2005)	Rehearsing My Choir (2005)

Professional ratings
Review scores
Source	Rating
AllMusic	4/5 stars
Drowned in Sound	(6/10)
musicOMH	(favorable)
Pitchfork Media	(8.9/10)
PopMatters	(8/10)
Prefix	(8.0/10)
Rolling Stone	3/5 stars
Stylus Magazine	A−
Tiny Mix Tapes	5/5 stars

EP is the third release from the U.S. indie rock band The Fiery Furnaces. It is 41 minutes in length, and is arguably not an EP, but rather a short LP, and thus a proper album.

It is a collection of the material written by the band between the release of their first and second albums. It contains tracks from the band's first three UK singles, and one new track, "Sullivan's Social Slub". The alternate single version of "Tropical Ice-Land" is included (stylized as "Tropical-Iceland"), but its B-side, an alternate recording of a song released on Gallowsbird's Bark, "We Got Back the Plague", is not included.

== Track listing ==
No.	Title	Original source	Length
1.	"Single Again"	A-side UK single / US promo single (July 2004)	3:51
2.	"Here Comes the Summer"	B-side of "Single Again" US promo single (2004)	3:29
3.	"Evergreen"	B-side of "Single Again" UK single	3:26
4.	"Sing for Me"	B-side of "Single Again" UK single	4:23
5.	"Tropical-Iceland" (single version)	A-side UK single (February 2004)	3:25
6.	"Duffer St. George"	B-side of "Crystal Clear" 7-inch UK single (September 2003)	2:32
7.	"Smelling Cigarettes"	B-side of "Crystal Clear" 12-inch and CD UK singles	5:30
8.	"Cousin Chris"	B-side of "Crystal Clear" 12-inch and CD UK singles	4:21
9.	"Sweet Spots"	B-side of "Tropical Ice-Land" 7-inch UK single	3:35
10.	"Sullivan's Social Slub"	Previously unreleased	6:31
Total length:			41:08
