= New View (Eleanor Friedberger album) =

Studio album by Eleanor Friedberger
- Released: January 22, 2016
- Genre: folk rock; acoustic pop
- Length: 45:10
- Label: Frenchkiss

Eleanor Friedberger chronology
Personal Record (2013)	New View (2016)	Rebound (2018)

Singles from New View
- 1. "He Didn't Mention His Mother" Released: October 29, 2015; 2. "Sweetest Girl" Released: January 6, 2016

New View is the third studio album by American indie rock musician Eleanor Friedberger, released on January 22, 2016 on Frenchkiss Records. It was Friedberger’s first release on the label, and was also regarded as a departure for her, with a more minimalistic and folk-influenced sound.

Upon its release, the album received universal acclaim from critics. It peaked within the top 20 of the US Heatseekers Albums chart, Friedberger’s third solo release to do so, and also became her highest-peaking entry on the Independent Albums chart. It was later ranked one of the year’s best albums by Uncut. The album spawned two singles: "He Didn’t Mention His Mother" and "Sweetest Girl".

== Background ==
Prior to the recording of New View, Friedberger had lived in Brooklyn, New York, for more than ten years. She decided to move to upstate New York; this experience was among the inspirations for the songwriting on her third studio album. She recorded the album live-to-tape in an upstate New York barn. New View was Friedberger’s first album to be released by Frenchkiss Records; her previous studio albums had been released by Merge Records. Regarding the album, Friedberger noted: "I hope that this album just sounds like an adult woman who’s OK, as boring as that sounds! I don’t want to sound like I’m miserable, [like] I’m angry, I’m hurt.”

== Composition ==
The album’s composition was considered to be "more easygoing" and "more traditional" than that of Personal Record. Meanwhile, its lyrics were deemed to be more melancholy than those of her earlier work. Repeatedly on the album, Friedberger explicitly alludes to writing songs about breakups. In "A Long Walk", Friedberger sings that she will "write this song alone" on the bus home. The album also marked a departure from previous records in that many of her songs are directed to "you", instead of being written in the first or third person, and in that several songs find her offering others advice instead of soliciting it for herself. Friedberger cited Yoko Ono, Neil Young, George Harrison, and Elyse as among her inspirations.

In "Cathy with the Curly Hair", Friedberger asks whether a friend still lives with the titular character, and receives the response "Yeah, but I’ve been waiting for a tall half-Greek girl to take me away from here"; the line was inspired by an actual comment from a friend. The song proceeds to describe more memories of the relationship from throughout the year. In an interview with Brooklyn Magazine, Friedberger was asked whether she was worried about using the friend’s comment in her song, to which she replied "Why? Nothing happened [...] It was like a cute joke. And I couldn’t not use that." The song has been described as a "bopping, synth-laden outlier" in the context of the album. Friedberger acknowledged that she considered leaving the song off of the album, because it stylistically differs from the rest of the album’s folk rock sound.

"Because I Asked You" includes a funk influence and has been compared to Van Morrison and Billy Preston. It has also been compared to the Fiery Furnaces recording "My Egyptian Grammar". In each verse, Friedberger poses a series of questions, to which the answer is always "because I asked you to". At the conclusion of the song, the answer changes to "because I love you".

== Release ==
On October 29, 2015, Friedberger announced that her third studio album was forthcoming, and revealed its title and track listing. In conjunction with this announcement, she released the album’s lead single, "He Didn’t Mention His Mother", via SoundCloud. It was noted that the album would not include "False Alphabet City", a single which she had recently released. Friedberger also unveiled a list of upcoming tour dates to promote the release, including performances in Los Angeles, San Francisco, New York City, and Brooklyn. On January 6, 2016, she released the album’s second single, "Sweetest Girl", and an accompanying music video.

The album was released on January 22, 2016, by Frenchkiss Records, as both a CD and an LP. On January 13, nine days before the album’s official release, the album was premiered on National Public Radio’s "First Listen" feature.

== Critical reception ==
Professional ratings
Aggregate scores
Source	Rating
Metacritic	81/100
Review scores
Source	Rating
The A.V. Club	B
The Guardian	4/5 stars
Pitchfork	7.8/10

New View received widely positive reviews upon its release. At Metacritic, which assigns a normalized rating out of 100 to reviews from mainstream critics, the album holds average score of 81, based on 25 reviews, indicating "universal acclaim". In a positive review for The Guardian, Tim Jonze praised Friedberger's lyrics and arrangements, writing: "[Her] offbeat delivery and lyrical quirks (“I’m opening a tree museum / It’s my new hobby,” she sings on Open Season; “And even if you had a twin / I wouldn’t notice her or him” is the touching sentiment of All Known Things) seem to balance nicely with this straightening out of the musical backdrop." Writing for Pitchfork, Hazel Cills also praised the album, writing: "At times New View can seem like a concept record detailing Friedberger's ambivalence about her main gift: spinning fragile memories and feelings into accessible songs." In a mostly positive review for The A.V. Club, Ignatiy Vishnevetsky wrote: "New View's songs feel more homebody-comfortable than anything she’s recorded before. It’s keenly observed, totally genuine, and eminently listenable, though one can’t help but miss the choppy energy and anxious undercurrents of Personal Record".

=== Accolades ===
Publication	Accolade	Year	Rank
Uncut	Top 75 Albums of 2016	2016	35

== Chart performance ==
On the Billboard Heatseekers Albums chart dated February 13, 2016, New View debuted and peaked at number 16, becoming her third top-twenty album on that chart; it was then her second-highest peak on the chart, after Personal Record, which had placed at number nine. That week, the album also debuted on the Billboard Independent Albums chart at number 34, becoming her second entry on that chart and also her highest-peaking.

== Track listing ==
All tracks are written by Eleanor Friedberger.

No.	Title	Length
1.	"He Didn't Mention His Mother"	4:00
2.	"Open Season"	4:42
3.	"Sweetest Girl"	3:01
4.	"Your Word"	3:41
5.	"Because I Asked You"	3:44
6.	"Never is a Long Time"	3:26
7.	"Cathy With the Curly Hair"	3:26
8.	"Two Versions of Tomorrow"	5:46
9.	"All Known Things"	5:07
10.	"Does Turquoise Work?"	2:28
11.	"A Long Walk"	5:49
Total length:		45:10

== Charts ==
Chart (2016)	Peak position
US Heatseekers Albums (Billboard)	16
US Independent Albums (Billboard)	34
