= Blueberry Boat =

Studio album by The Fiery Furnaces
- Released: July 13, 2004
- Recorded: 2004
- Genre: Indie rock; progressive rock; experimental rock; art rock
- Length: 76:09
- Label: Rough Trade
- Producer: Matthew Friedberger, Nicolas Vernhes

The Fiery Furnaces chronology
Gallowsbird's Bark (2003)	Blueberry Boat (2004)	EP (2005)

Blueberry Boat is the second album by American indie rock band The Fiery Furnaces. It was released on July 13, 2004, just over ten months following their debut album, Gallowsbird's Bark. Blueberry Boat polarized music critics due to its long, complex songs and esoteric lyrics.

== Music and lyrics ==
More than twenty different instruments were used in the creation of this album, including the sitar, which was substituted for guitar on some songs. Keyboards, guitars, and drums are the main instruments used. As with all Fiery Furnaces releases, Eleanor Friedberger provides most of the vocals, with her brother Matt adding to a few songs. Matt is considered the main instrumentalist for the band, while both Friedbergers share lyrical duties. The album is more structurally complex than the band's debut, Gallowsbird's Bark, and most of the songs have distinct movements that sound like multiple songs combined.

The song "Straight Street" references the biblical "street called straight" in Damascus. "1917" features references to the 1917 World Series, the most recent series that the Chicago White Sox had won at the point this album was released.

== Critical reception ==
Professional ratings
Aggregate scores
Source	Rating
Metacritic	70/100
Review scores
Source	Rating
AllMusic	4/5 stars
Entertainment Weekly	A−
The Guardian	2/5 stars
Los Angeles Times	3.5/4 stars
Mojo	4/5 stars
NME	1/10
Pitchfork	9.6/10
Q	4/5 stars
Rolling Stone	2/5 stars
Spin	C

Blueberry Boat garnered polarized but generally positive reviews. At Metacritic, which assigns a normalized rating out of 100 to reviews from critics, the album received an average score of 70, which indicates "generally positive reviews", based on 34 reviews. In a rave review, Chris Dahlen of Pitchfork described Blueberry Boat as "a record for the overgrown part of our brain that craves engrossing complexity". Heather Phares of AllMusic wrote that the album "can be appreciated in the same way you would a puzzle box with intricate, endlessly shifting parts: you can spend a lot of time trying to unlock (or describe) its riddles, or just enjoy the artfulness behind them."

Writing for The Guardian, Dave Pleschek found Blueberry Boat's lyrics and song structures to be overly "obtuse" and stated that the Friedbergers "will try anything but don't know when to stop", calling the album a "a crashing disappointment". Robert Christgau of The Village Voice gave the album a "dud" rating, indicating "a bad record whose details rarely merit further thought." The NME panned the album as "toe-curlingly unlistenable."

Pitchfork placed Blueberry Boat at number 145 on their list of top 200 albums of the 2000s.

== Track listing ==
No.	Title	Length
1.	"Quay Cur"	10:25
2.	"Straight Street"	5:00
3.	"Blueberry Boat"	9:09
4.	"Chris Michaels"	7:53
5.	"Paw Paw Tree"	4:39
6.	"My Dog Was Lost But Now He's Found"	3:29
7.	"Mason City"	8:14
8.	"Chief Inspector Blancheflower"	8:58
9.	"Spaniolated"	3:21
10.	"1917"	4:52
11.	"Birdie Brain"	3:05
12.	"Turning Round"	2:13
13.	"Wolf Notes"	4:51
Total length:		76:09

== Personnel ==
The Fiery Furnaces

- Eleanor Friedberger – performance
- Matthew Friedberger – performance, production
- The Fiery Furnaces – packaging

Additional personnel

- Samara Lubelski – violin, engineering, mixing
- David Muller – drums (3, 4, 7)
- Emily Scholnick – artwork
- Nicolas Vernhes – engineering, mixing, computer editing, drums (2, 4, 13)
