= I'm Going Away =

Studio album by The Fiery Furnaces
- Released: July 21, 2009
- Recorded: December 2008 – February 2009
- Genre: Indie rock
- Length: 47:28
- Label: Thrill Jockey
- Producer: Matthew Friedberger

The Fiery Furnaces chronology
| Remember (2008) | I'm Going Away (2009) | Take Me Round Again (2009) |

Professional ratings
Review scores
| Source | Rating |
|---|---|
| AllMusic | 4/5 stars |
| BBC | (average) |
| Drowned In Sound | (6/10) |
| God is in the TV | 4/5 stars |
| NME | (8/10) |
| Pitchfork Media | (7.8/10) |
| PopMatters | (8/10) |
| Spin | 4/5 stars |
| Tiny Mix Tapes | 3/5 stars |
| Toro | 2.5/5 stars |
| Ultimate-Guitar.com | (8/10) |

I'm Going Away is The Fiery Furnaces' seventh album. It was released, on CD and LP, on July 21, 2009 in the US and August 24, 2009 in the UK.

The CD version was presented in a 4 panel mini-LP style jacket.

The LP version was pressed on high quality 180 gram virgin vinyl at RTI and was presented in an old-style tip-on gatefold jacket with MP3 download coupon.

== Production ==
I’m Going Away was recorded by and mixed with Jason Loewenstein at the end of 2008 and the beginning of 2009 in New York City. Jason also played bass and Bob D'Amico played drums. All songs were written together by Eleanor and Matthew Friedberger, except for the title track, which is “trad. Arranged by.” Eleanor wrote most of the lyrics; Matt wrote most of the music and also produced the album.

The following statement was released by the label as a description:

All rock music is a sort of dramatic music. And since the times are tough, it makes sense to have that “drama” be something more like a version of Taxi than something like a version of Titanic. We like Taxi better than Titanic anyway. So we hope that some of the songs on this record can be used as theme songs to folk's own personal versions of Taxi. Because—ideally—the dramatic setting of the music isn't provided by the story or image of the given act or band. It's provided by the lives of the people who use—listen to—the music. That is pop music's promise and problem, or danger. So be careful and don't get canceled.

== Track listing ==
| No. | Title | Length |
|---|---|---|
| 1. | "I'm Going Away" | 2:27 |
| 2. | "Drive to Dallas" | 4:53 |
| 3. | "The End Is Near" | 2:59 |
| 4. | "Charmaine Champagne" | 3:06 |
| 5. | "Cut the Cake" | 3:03 |
| 6. | "Even in the Rain" | 4:17 |
| 7. | "Staring at the Steeple" | 3:55 |
| 8. | "Ray Bouvier" | 3:11 |
| 9. | "Keep Me in the Dark" | 4:04 |
| 10. | "Lost at Sea" | 5:22 |
| 11. | "Cups & Punches" | 3:36 |
| 12. | "Take Me Round Again" | 6:35 |
| Total length: | | 47:28 |

== Personnel ==
- Matthew Friedberger - Vocals, guitar, keyboards
- Eleanor Friedberger - Vocals
- Jason Loewenstein - Bass
- Bob D'Amico - Drums
