= Michael Goodman =

American photographer (born 1954)

Michael Goodman (born 1954, New York City) is an American photographer.

== Work ==
Michael Goodman is an international construction photographer. As Chief Contributing Photographer to Engineering News Record from 1988 to 2008 Goodman has had over 135 Magazine cover photographs.

With a focus on the urban and industrial landscape, Goodman has covered major construction developments in over 42 countries.

In 1993 Goodman's photos of the World Trade Center attack was featured in Life Magazine.

Goodman's coverage of the aftermath of Hurricane Katrina in New Orleans is considered the most extensive by, among others, then Editor-in-Chief of Architectural Record, Robert Ivy and in 2006 Goodman's work was selected as the official photography of the recovery efforts representing The United States at the 10th International Architectural Biennale in Venice, Italy.

== Awards ==
- The Construction Writer's Association Gordon B. Wright Photo Journalism Award for Best Series of Related Photographs and, 2004, and Best Feature Photograph, 2007.
- The Jesse H. Neal Award, 2006 for photography work on Dubai.

== Exhibitions ==
- "After the Flood: Building on Higher Ground", A+D Museum, Los Angeles, California, 2008
- Museo Del Canal Interoceanico, Panama City, Panama, 2007
- Collaborative Development Gallery {Code}, Bangkok, Thailand, 2007
- The U.S. Pavilion at the 10th International Architectural Biennale, Venice, Italy, 2006
