= Gallowsbird's Bark =

Studio album by the Fiery Furnaces
- Released: September 23, 2003
- Studio: Rare Book Room
- Genres: Blues rock; punk rock; power pop; psychedelia
- Length: 46:45
- Label: Rough Trade
- Producer: Nicolas Vernhes

The Fiery Furnaces chronology
Gallowsbird's Bark (2003)	Blueberry Boat (2004)

Gallowsbird's Bark is the debut studio album by the Fiery Furnaces released by Rough Trade Records in 2003.

== Additional information ==
"Inca Rag"/"Name Game" is actually two songs that blend into each other, this being an indication of the direction the band would take on the following album Blueberry Boat.

"Tropical Ice-Land", "Rub-Alcohol Blues" and "We Got Back the Plague" share the same tempo, are grouped together on the album cover track listing and could for this reason be construed as a three-part song. "Rub Alcohol Blues", credited to William E. Myer is most known for being performed by (and written for) the folk banjo player Dock Boggs.

"Crystal Clear", "Tropical Ice-Land" and "We Got Back the Plague" have all appeared on singles, "Tropical Ice-Land" also appearing on the 2005 compilation EP. These single versions of "Tropical Ice-Land" and "We Got Back the Plague" however differ significantly from the original album versions.

== Reception ==
Professional ratings
Aggregate scores
Source	Rating
Metacritic	77/100
Review scores
Source	Rating
AllMusic	4.5/5 stars
Blender	3/5 stars
Entertainment Weekly	B
The Guardian	3/5 stars
Los Angeles Times	3.5/4 stars
Mojo	4/5 stars
Pitchfork	8.4/10
Q	4/5 stars
Uncut	4/5 stars

Gallowsbird's Bark received favorable reviews from music critics. At Metacritic, which assigns a normalized rating out of 100 to reviews from critics, the album received an average score of 77, which indicates "generally positive reviews," based on 15 reviews. Heather Phares of AllMusic wrote that despite the songs "Crystal Clear" and "Two Fat Feet" sounding "dizzying and jumbled at first, eventually their gleeful chaos settles into something a little more orderly, but no less mischievous", and she called the album "a fantastic debut album that only gets richer and better with more listens." Writing for Pitchfork, Amanda Petrusich described the album as "accessible, but skewed and peculiar enough to keep you peeking nervously over your shoulder every couple of minutes." Robert Christgau of The Village Voice gave the album a two-star honorable mention rating and quipped that the album contained the "most intriguing use of roots riffs in an eclectic context nobody comprehends (including them)", citing "Worry Worry" and "Up in the North" as highlights.

=== Legacy ===
In a 20th anniversary review for Stereogum, Natalie Marlin called Bark "an auspicious but unassuming debut" and complimented the band's fusion of blues and classic rock that gave it an "idiosyncratic sound all its own." She dubbed Bark one of the 2000s' "strongest straight blues rock albums."

== Track listing ==
All songs composed by the Fiery Furnaces, except where noted.

1. "South Is Only a Home" – 2:42
2. "I'm Gonna Run" – 2:24
3. "Leaky Tunnel" – 3:33
4. "Up in the North" – 2:21
5. "Inca Rag/Name Game" – 3:56
6. "Asthma Attack" – 2:08
7. "Don't Dance Her Down" (Lyrics adapted from "Big Jim in the Barroom") – 3:17
8. "Crystal Clear" – 2:10
9. "Two Fat Feet" – 4:04
10. "Bow Wow" – 3:47
11. "Gale Blow" – 2:15
12. "Worry Worry" – 2:04
13. "Bright Blue Tie" – 2:06
14. "Tropical Ice-Land" – 3:30
15. "Rub-Alcohol Blues" (William E. Myer) – 2:03
16. "We Got Back the Plague" – 4:14

== Personnel ==
- Eleanor Friedberger – vocals, guitar
- Matthew Friedberger – vocals, piano, synth, bass
- Ryan Sawyer – drums
