= Rehearsing My Choir =

Studio album by the Fiery Furnaces
- Released: October 24, 2005
- Recorded: 2005
- Genres: Indie rock; spoken word
- Length: 58:45
- Label: Rough Trade
- Producer: Matthew Friedberger

The Fiery Furnaces chronology
EP (2005)	Rehearsing My Choir (2005)	Bitter Tea (2006)

Rehearsing My Choir is the fourth full-length album by the Fiery Furnaces and was released in 2005. It is a concept album featuring Olga Sarantos, grandmother of the band's Matthew and Eleanor Friedberger, narrating stories relating to her life. Though the instrumentation is as complex as on the band's previous releases, the vocals mostly take the form of spoken word. At points Eleanor Friedberger speaks or sings words corresponding to the character of a younger Olga Sarantos, the two engaging in dialogue. Olga Sarantos died on December 31, 2007.

== Track listing ==
1. "The Garfield El" – 4:23
2. "The Wayward Granddaughter" – 6:23
3. "A Candymaker's Knife in My Handbag" – 4:48
4. "We Wrote Letters Everyday" – 4:17
5. "Forty-Eight Twenty-Three Twenty-Second Street" – 4:55
6. "Guns Under the Counter" – 4:31
7. "Seven Silver Curses" – 9:20
8. "Though Let's Be Fair" – 2:05
9. "Slavin' Away" – 6:54
10. "Rehearsing My Choir" – 5:43
11. "Does It Remind You of When?" – 5:22

== Additional information ==
Narratives presented on Rehearesing My Choir are not presented chronologically. Matthew Friedberger, the songwriter and lyricist, gives a summary and explanation:

Dear Listener, Tracks 3 and 4 take place in the 40s; tracks 5 and 6 in the 20s and 30s; track 7 in the later 50s; track 8 starts in the very early 40s; track 9 goes back and forth; track 10 takes place in the early 60s; the final track takes place in the early 90s. Track 2 takes place a few years ago; track 1 took place when it was recorded. The action depicted in "The Wayward Granddaughter" and "Slavin' Away" does not include the character Olga Sarantos plays on the rest of the record. "Slavin' Away" imagines that character—the main character—fantasizing, a bit remotely, about the hard lot of other women. Now, I wouldn't guess that the Main Character actually thought the woman concerned was riding around in a Norton side-car and operating her own cottage industry trinket assembly/sweatshop: but it might have pleased her to picture it so. "The Wayward Granddaughter" is about a different Greek-American grandmother and her popular granddaughter ("Connie"). They're from Chicago's south suburbs and don't figure in the rest of the record; I wanted to have another (slightly younger) grandmother and family in there for perspective or comparison's sake, so to speak.

== Critical reception ==
Professional ratings
Review scores
Source	Rating
Allmusic	3.5/5 stars
The A.V. Club	4/5 stars
Gigwise.com	1/5 stars
The Guardian	4/5 stars
Pitchfork Media	(4.0/10)
PopMatters	2/10 stars
Rolling Stone	3.5/5 stars
Tiny Mix Tapes	5/5 stars

Like much of the band's output, the album received both enthusiastically positive and negative reviews from music critics. JSpicer at Tiny Mix Tapes called it a "Great American Novel via guitars, drums, bells, and whistles" and admired its envelope-pushing sound and unique storytelling. Justin Cober-Lake at PopMatters found the storytelling "neither nuanced nor complex" and wrote that the music "lacks the focus, coherence, and development to be rewarding beyond a novelty listen."
