= Widow City =

Studio album by The Fiery Furnaces
- Released: October 8, 2007
- Recorded: January – February 2007
- Genre: Indie rock
- Length: 59:05
- Label: Thrill Jockey
- Producer: Matthew Friedberger

The Fiery Furnaces chronology
Bitter Tea (2006)	Widow City (2007)	Remember (2008)

Widow City is the sixth full-length album by The Fiery Furnaces. It was released in the UK on October 8, 2007, and in the US on October 9 on Chicago-based label Thrill Jockey. The album art features Eleanor Friedberger on the front and Matthew Friedberger on the back.

== Title and themes ==
The album heavily references occultism, Egyptian thematic elements and mysticism. The album is a reference to the holy city of Vrindavan in northern India.

== Track listing ==
1. "The Philadelphia Grand Jury" – 7:18
2. "Duplexes of the Dead" – 2:39
3. "Automatic Husband" – 2:08
4. "Ex-Guru" – 2:42
5. "Clear Signal from Cairo" – 6:10
6. "My Egyptian Grammar" – 3:21
7. "The Old Hag Is Sleeping" – 2:54
8. "Japanese Slippers" – 2:57
9. "Navy Nurse" – 6:28
10. "Uncle Charlie" – 2:16
11. "Right by Conquest" – 3:36
12. "Restorative Beer" – 2:37
13. "Wicker Whatnots" – 4:27
14. "Cabaret of the Seven Devils" – 2:44
15. "Pricked in the Heart" – 2:15
16. "Widow City" – 4:33
17. "Barnabus and Paul (iTunes Bonus Track)" – 2:43
18. "Mandolin and Maracas (iTunes Bonus Track)" – 2:47

== Additional information ==
Professional ratings
Review scores
Source	Rating
Allmusic	4/5 stars
The A.V. Club	B
Pitchfork Media	(7.4/10)
PopMatters	(4/10)
Stylus Magazine	A
This Is Fake DIY	4/5 stars
Tiny Mix Tapes	4/5 stars

A portion of the press release:

As on past Fiery Furnaces' albums, the backing tracks have a narrative aspect, excuse the expression. For instance, the long 'bassoon' and altered tabla part in "The Philadelphia Grand Jury" might indicate the singer in the song's waiting for the word (verdict). The loud guitar-drums-and-Chamberlin 'thunderstorm' part towards the end of "Ex-Guru" indicates the thunderstorm brought about by the jilted ex-guru. The synthesizer filtering of the acoustic guitar in "Duplexes of the Dead" indicates the odd light that filters through the dirty curtains a duplex of the dead would no doubt have. The swelling melody at the end of "My Egyptian Grammar" indicates the pride that likely swells up in the breast of a blue jay referred to therein. The monkey and cow noises in "The Old Hag is Sleeping" indicate the rooster at dawn. The guitar solo at the end of "Cabaret of the Seven Devils" counts to seven. The train sound effect in "Japanese Slippers" indicates a train. And so forth.

David Byrne recorded a cover version of the song "Ex-Guru" for a Thrill Jockey compilation.
