= Bitter Tea =

2006 studio album by the Fiery Furnaces

Studio album by The Fiery Furnaces
- Released: April 18, 2006
- Recorded: 2005–2006
- Genres: Indie rock; progressive rock; experimental rock; electronic
- Length: 72:23
- Labels: Fat Possum (US); Rough Trade (UK)
- Producer: Matthew Friedberger

The Fiery Furnaces chronology
Rehearsing My Choir (2005)	Bitter Tea (2006)	Widow City (2007)

Bitter Tea is the fifth full-length album by the Fiery Furnaces, released on April 18, 2006, via Fat Possum in the U.S and Rough Trade in the UK. After it leaked onto the internet on February 22, the band immediately started selling the CD on tour.

The band envisioned Bitter Tea as a loose companion piece to their previous album, Rehearsing My Choir, released just five months prior.

== Critical response ==
Professional ratings
Review scores
Source	Rating
AllMusic	3.5/5 stars
The A.V. Club	B
Blender	3/5 stars
Pitchfork Media	7.6/10
PopMatters	7/10 stars
Tiny Mix Tapes	4/5 stars

Bitter Tea received generally positive reviews that were less polarized than their previous two proper albums, Blueberry Boat and Rehearsing My Choir. At Pitchfork Media, Mark Richardson praised the "sweet, undeniable melody" of "Teach Me Sweetheart" and the poppy likeability of "Benton Harbor Blues." Heather Phares at AllMusic criticized the album for being too long and "oddly diluted," but admitted that "even if all the songs aren't uniformly great, there's something interesting about each of them."

== Track listing ==
=== CD / digital ===
1. "In My Little Thatched Hut" – 4:13
2. "I'm in No Mood" – 3:39
3. "Black-Hearted Boy" – 5:11
4. "Bitter Tea" – 5:45
5. "Teach Me Sweetheart" – 5:56
6. "I'm Waiting to Know You" – 4:01
7. "The Vietnamese Telephone Ministry" – 5:44
8. "Oh Sweet Woods" – 5:25
9. "Borneo" – 4:17
10. "Police Sweater Blood Vow" – 2:53
11. "Nevers" – 5:02
12. "Benton Harbor Blues" – 7:23
13. "Whistle Rhapsody" – 4:20
14. "Nevers (Reprise)" (unlisted) – 5:14
15. "Benton Harbor Blues (Reprise)" (unlisted) – 3:13

=== Vinyl ===
Side 1

1. "In My Little Thatched Hut" – 4:13
2. "Teach Me Sweetheart" – 5:56
3. "I'm Waiting to Know You" – 4:01

Side 2

1. "I'm in No Mood" – 3:39
2. "Black-Hearted Boy" – 5:11
3. "Bitter Tea" – 5:45

Side 3

1. "The Vietnamese Telephone Ministry" – 5:44
2. "Oh Sweet Woods" – 5:25
3. "Borneo" – 4:17

Side 4

1. "Police Sweater Blood Vow" – 2:53
2. "Nevers" – 5:02
3. "Benton Harbor Blues" – 7:23
4. "Whistle Rhapsody" – 4:20

== Backmasking ==
The album contains several instances of backmasking throughout.

Song title	Time of backmasking	Backwards lyrics	Comments
"In My Little Thatched Hut"	2:59	"Tears of joy, tears of joy, tears of joy, tears of joy..."	
"I'm in No Mood"	2:10	"And the pin in my hair was stuck in my head. I didn’t undress for bed. I was so drunk last night." "I swear the pin in my hair got stuck in my head. I didn't even undress for bed. I was so drunk last night."	
"Black-hearted Boy"	2:56-3:56	"See the smoke from your kiln, pine boughs burn the bricks dead hard in their fog as I stand cold with my back broke by the bog. Find your cross-cut saw, come blunt and jagged dry and try cut my tongue out to keep on your wall up high. I tipped my toe on the bamboo strip; I took stone honey in exchange for my rags. Don't dare paint your board moonlight white. Go dangle your fish hook out in the gutter again."	
"The Vietnamese Telephone Ministry"	Entire song, end to beginning	"I thought myself an unworthy thing, despairing of my case all the time boys. I thought myself an unworthy thing, despairing of my case all the time boys. Damn it all, damn it all to hell. Damn it all, damn it all."	Much of the vocal sounds backwards when played forward.
"Oh Sweet Woods"	0:44 and 3:01	"Oh sweet woods of delight, Oh solitariness. Farewell direction, farewell all affection."	"Farewell direction, farewell all affection." is from a Philip Sidney poem.
"Nevers"		See comments	The vocals switch between backwards and forwards even within one line of lyrics. Full lyrics are available at the Fiery Furnaces' official site
"Benton Harbor Blues"	3:45	See comments	The backmasked parts are gibberish phrases played backward and forward simultaneously, so it sounds the same when played backwards and forwards.
