= The Fiery Furnaces =

American indie rock band

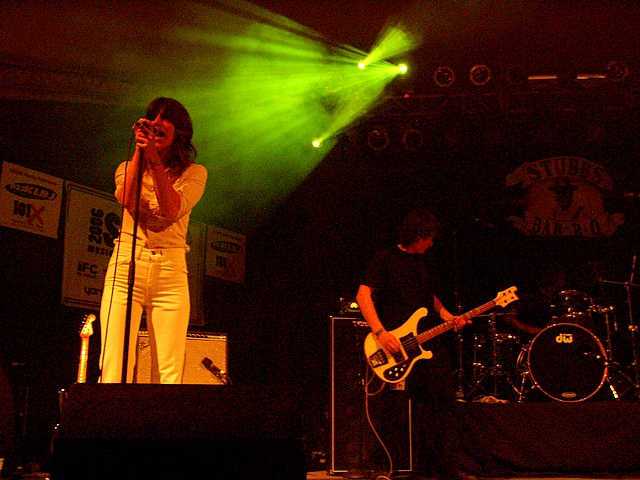

Background information
- Origin: New York City, New York, U.S.
- Genres: Indie rock; psychedelic pop; art rock
- Years active: 2000–2011, 2020–present
- Labels: Rough Trade; Fat Possum; Thrill Jockey; Third Man
- Members: Matthew Friedberger; Eleanor Friedberger
- Website: Official site

The Fiery Furnaces are an American indie rock band, formed in 2000 in Brooklyn, New York. The band's primary members are Matthew and Eleanor Friedberger. The siblings are originally from Oak Park, Illinois, a near-western suburb of Chicago. They are known for their ambitious, highly conceptual releases, which have frequently divided critical opinion.

In May 2011, the band entered a nine-year hiatus, with both Matthew and Eleanor pursuing solo careers. In February 2020, it was announced that The Fiery Furnaces would reunite to play at the Pitchfork Music Festival in Chicago. However, due to the COVID-19 pandemic the event was canceled. It was later revealed that the band signed to Jack White's Third Man Records label.

== History ==
The Fiery Furnaces signed with Rough Trade in 2002, and recorded their debut album, Gallowsbird's Bark, the same year. Released in 2003, it was often compared in the press to The White Stripes due to the garage blues elements of the band's sound and the fact that the members are siblings, which the White Stripes duo originally presented themselves as.

Matthew is primarily responsible for the band's studio instrumentation and songwriting, while Eleanor handles the majority of the vocal duties. Drummer Andy Knowles and bassist Toshi Yano both joined the band for live performances in time for their 2004 tour. Beginning with a performance at the April 2004 All Tomorrow's Parties festival in Camber Sands, England, the band's live performances took the form of hour-long, continuous sets of music featuring snippets from most of their recorded songs. Many times, several songs were melded together to create a conglomerate song that encompassed material from previously released songs, this producing similarly complicated set lists for the band to follow.

The Fiery Furnaces released their second album, Blueberry Boat, in the summer of 2004. It is also often interpreted as a multi-layered concept album. "Quay Cur," the ten-minute lead track on Blueberry Boat, switches from dirty, gurgling organ to slide-guitar-fueled ditties, pulsing electronic beats to abstract lullaby within a few minutes, highlighting the Fiery Furnaces' variety in songwriting. Some critics, however, interpreted this type of material as evidence that the album is unfocused. The epic nature of the majority of the songs made them unsuitable for radio play so the band prepared "Single Again," a take on a traditional folk song as a substitute.

This single, along with their previously released ones, was mostly only made available to the UK audience, so in January 2005 the band released a 41-minute compilation disc named EP (this confusingly being a designation commonly reserved for shorter discs). EP featured two new songs, all of the band's singles and b-sides (with the exception of an alternate version of "We Got Back The Plague" found on the "Tropical Ice-Land" single), and was for this reason a contrast to the epic and, according to some, inaccessible nature of Blueberry Boat.

Their following album, Rehearsing My Choir (released in October 2005), saw the band return to an experimental sound once again. A concept album featuring the Friedbergers' grandmother, Olga Sarantos, narrating stories about her life, Rehearsing My Choir was met with widely differing opinions from both the press and the band's fans, being branded "difficult" even by those who rated it highly. Sarantos previously worked as choir director at a Greek Orthodox church, and her croaked reminiscences form the backbone to this peculiar, piecemeal storybook of an album. Jason Loewenstein of Sebadoh and Bob D'Amico took over band duties for the supporting tour, replacing Toshi Yano and Andy Knowles.

The band released their fifth LP, entitled Bitter Tea, in April 2006. In interviews they stated that the album was influenced by the sound of synthpop group Devo, and Eleanor Friedberger stated the album was "definitely the poppiest thing we've done."

Matthew Friedberger released Winter Women and Holy Ghost Language School in August 2006, two separate albums which were packaged as a double album. Eleanor appeared on neither album and Matthew did not tour in support of his solo releases.

The band did a short tour in October and November 2006, supported by San Francisco experimental rock band, Deerhoof. This tour saw Matthew on keyboard, Eleanor on vocals, Jason Loewenstein on wah-wah pedaled guitar, Bob D'Amico on drums and the addition of Michael Goodman on percussion. The songs had a tropical/salsa feel to them, and most of the tracks from Bitter Tea were played as one long song, lasting 30 minutes—a medley format the band previously used while promoting Blueberry Boat.

In June 2007, it was announced in The Chicago Reader that the band had signed with Chicago label Thrill Jockey and their album Widow City was later released on October 9, 2007. Unlike their two previous efforts, this album lacks a central concept and has a 70s album rock feel. The band toured in support of the album throughout the later months of 2007 and early 2008. A live compilation album, Remember, was released on August 16, 2008.

The band's seventh studio album I'm Going Away was released in the US on July 21, 2009, on Thrill Jockey and the UK on August 24, 2009. A second album, Take Me Round Again, which presents many of the same songs from "I'm Going Away" in a new way, was released on November 10, 2009. These tracks were made individually by Mathew and Eleanor, resulting in some overlap. These songs have the same lyrics as "I'm Going Away", but consist of completely new instrument and vocal recordings that give a new take on the same material.

=== Hiatus ===
The Fiery Furnaces went on an extended hiatus following a brief 2011 tour. Their final concert before the hiatus was on May 27, 2011 at the Primavera Sound Festival in Barcelona. Since then, each of the siblings has focused on their solo careers, with Matthew releasing a vinyl box set entitled Solos in 2011, and Eleanor releasing her first solo album, titled Last Summer, on July 12, 2011.

=== Return ===
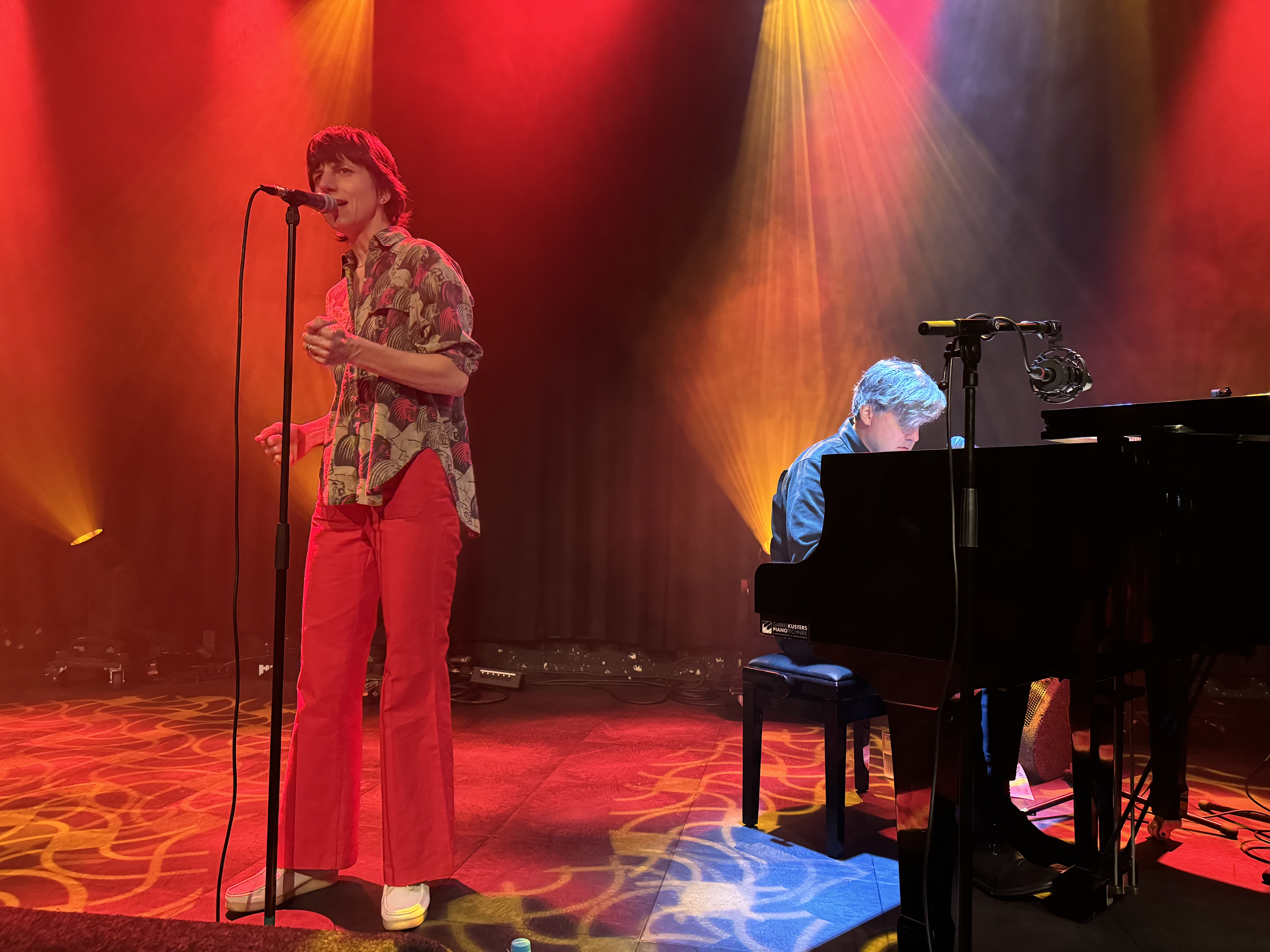
The Fiery Furnaces performing at De Helling in Utrecht, the Netherlands during Le Guess Who? festival in November 2025

In early 2020, The Fiery Furnaces announced they would be performing at the Pitchfork Music Festival in Chicago that July, their first live show in nearly a decade. However, due to the COVID-19 pandemic the event was cancelled. They ended up performing at the Pitchfork Music Festival in 2021.

It was later revealed that the band signed to Jack White's Third Man Records label.

The band returned on 18 June 2020 with a new single, "Down at the So and So on Somewhere", the single received praise from Pitchfork, RollingStone, The Guardian, Uncut, and other publications.

== Discography ==
Studio albums

- Gallowsbird's Bark (2003)
- Blueberry Boat (2004)
- EP (2005)
- Rehearsing My Choir (2005)
- Bitter Tea (2006)
- Widow City (2007)
- I'm Going Away (2009)
- Take Me Round Again (2009)
- Stuck in My Head (2024)

Live album

- Remember (2008)
