= Matthew Friedberger =

American songwriter

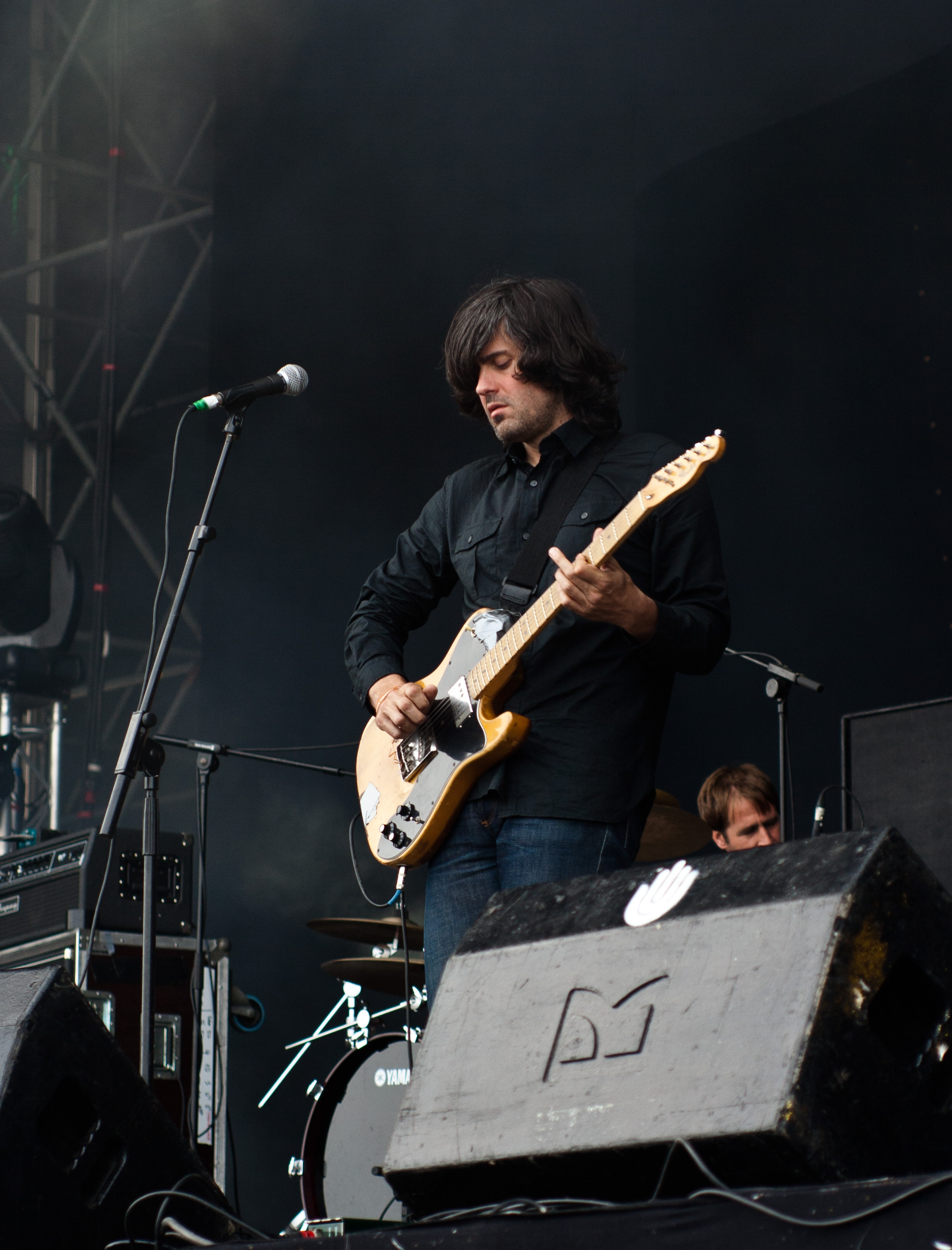
Matthew Friedberger

Matthew Friedberger (born October 21, 1972, in Oak Park, Illinois, United States) is an American singer, songwriter and multi-instrumentalist best known for his work in the indie rock duo the Fiery Furnaces with his sister Eleanor Friedberger.

== Background and career ==
Matthew and Eleanor grew up singing with their grandmother Olga Sarantos and family in a Greek Orthodox Church. Details of events in Sarantos' life are depicted on their Rehearsing My Choir album. Matthew has been a vegetarian since childhood.

The first song Matt ever wrote was in fourth grade. He was assigned to make a weather barometer for class but didn't feel like doing that, so instead he convinced his teacher to let him write a song on the piano about weather. The song was titled "Cumulous Nimbus Cloud" and was what Matt describes as "mostly pounding on the piano".

Before starting the Fiery Furnaces, Matthew Friedberger played in bands including Corndolly, Liquorette, the Mezzanines and the Grand Vizars. At the age of 17, Matthew moved to Germany only to return shortly thereafter. He attended the University of Illinois for a while and continued to live there, writing comic books, until the age of 26 when he moved back home.

It was after moving home that he encouraged Eleanor to start singing. The two wrote the song "Duffer St. George" (named after a store in London) one night while discussing a recent trip Eleanor had taken to England and the Fiery Furnaces began. In the band, he contributed the majority of the instrumentation, wrote most of the songs and lyrics, and occasionally sang, while Eleanor did most of the vocals and wrote some lyrics. The band went on to release seven studio albums and one live album before going on an extended hiatus in 2011.

Aside from his work with the Fiery Furnaces, Friedberger released a two-disc solo album, titled Winter Women and Holy Ghost Language School by 859 Recordings in August 2006. He dedicated the album to his sister, saying later in an interview, "we dedicated all [the Fiery Furnaces] records to our parents, so I thought it was appropriate that this record be dedicated to Eleanor". In November 2010, Friedberger revealed that he was to release eight new albums in 2011 in a vinyl-only subscription series called Solos. The first six albums were set to ship every two months in 2011 and featured Friedberger on vocals accompanied by a single instrument, while the last two were bonus albums that shipped with the final installment and featured multiple instruments.

In July 2012, Thrill Jockey announced that Friedberger would be releasing yet another album on October 30, 2012, entitled Matricidal Sons of Bitches. The album is composed of 45 largely instrumental tracks, organized into four suites: "Ladies In Waiting- Waiting Forever", "Brand New Mothers- Trying It Out", "Expectant Fathers- In For a Surprise" and "Dying on the Sixth Side". In June 2016, Matthew Friedberger teamed up with Sebadoh’s Bob D'Amico releasing, under the stage name Saqqara Mastabas, the album Libras.

== Discography ==
=== Solo albums ===
- Winter Women and Holy Ghost Language School (2006)
- Solos (2011)
- Matricidal Sons of Bitches (October 2012)
- Mr. Fried Burger, I Resume (April 2015, under the name "MR. FRIED BURGER/NEUE FRIEDBERGER OPER/M. Friedberger")

=== With the Fiery Furnaces ===
See The Fiery Furnaces Discography
