= Can You Hear Me? (Ayayaya) =

2012 single by Wiley

Single by Wiley featuring Skepta, Jme and Ms D

from the album The Ascent
- Released: 28 October 2012
- Genre: Pop rap; dance
- Length: 3:52
- Label: Warner Music
- Songwriters: Richard Cowie; Joseph Adenuga; Jamie Adenuga; Dayo Olatunji
- Producers: Rymez; Sillkey

Wiley singles chronology
"Heatwave" (2012)	"Can You Hear Me? (Ayayaya)" (2012)	"Banger" (2013)

Skepta singles chronology
"Get Busy" (2012)	"Can You Hear Me? (Ayayaya)" (2012)	"That's Not Me" (2014)

Jme singles chronology
"Murking" (2012)	"Can You Hear Me? (Ayayaya)" (2012)	"Banger" (2013)

Ms D singles chronology
"Heatwave" (2012)	"Can You Hear Me? (Ayayaya)" (2012)	"Reload" (2013)

"Can You Hear Me? (Ayayaya)" is a single by British musician Wiley, featuring vocals from Skepta, Jme and Ms D. It was released as the second single from his ninth album, The Ascent, on 28 October 2012 for digital download in the United Kingdom. It was written by Richard Cowie, Joseph Adenuga, Jamie Adenuga, Dayo Olatunji and produced by Rymez and Sillkey.

== Music video ==
A music video to accompany the release of "Can You Hear Me? (Ayayaya)" was first released onto YouTube on 4 October 2012 at a total length of three minutes and fifty-three seconds.

== Chart performance ==
"Can You Hear Me? (Ayayaya)" debuted at number 3 on UK chart on 4 November 2012. The song entered the Irish Singles Chart at number 26.

== Track listings ==
Digital download
No.	Title	Length
1.	"Can You Hear Me? (Ayayaya)"	3:52
2.	"Can You Hear Me? (Ayayaya)" (MOTI Remix)	5:12
3.	"Can You Hear Me? (Ayayaya)" (TAI Remix)	9:11
4.	"Can You Hear Me? (Ayayaya)" (Adam F Remix)	9:11
5.	"Can You Hear Me? (Ayayaya)" (Instrumental)	9:11

Promotional CD single
No.	Title	Length
1.	"Can You Hear Me? (Ayayaya)" (Radio Edit)	3:53
2.	"Can You Hear Me? (Ayayaya)" (Instrumental Mix)	3:40

== Credits and personnel ==
- Vocals – Wiley, Skepta, Jme & Ms D
- Producer – Rymez & Sillkey
- Lyrics – Richard Cowie, Joseph Adenuga, Jamie Adenuga, Dayo Olatunji

== Charts ==
=== Weekly charts ===
Weekly chart performance
Chart (2012–13)	Peak position
Ireland (IRMA)	26
Israel International Airplay (Media Forest)	7
Poland Dance (ZPAV)	9
Scotland Singles (Official Charts)	3
Slovakia Airplay (ČNS IFPI)	51
UK Dance (Official Charts)	1
UK Radio Airplay (Nielsen Soundscan)	18
UK Singles (Official Charts)	3 (Note: The UK Singles Chart was sales-only as of the week "Can You Hear Me?" peaked. Data from the streaming chart was not incorporated until July 2014.)
UK Streaming (Official Charts)	11
UK TV Airplay (Nielsen Soundscan)	1

=== Year-end charts ===
Chart (2012)	Position
UK Singles Chart	92

== Certifications ==
Region	Certification	Certified units/sales
United Kingdom (BPI)	Platinum	600,000^{‡}
^{‡} Sales+streaming figures based on certification alone.

== Release history ==
Country	Date	Format	Label
United Kingdom	28 October 2012	Digital download	Warner Music
