= Official Audio Streaming Chart =

Music chart

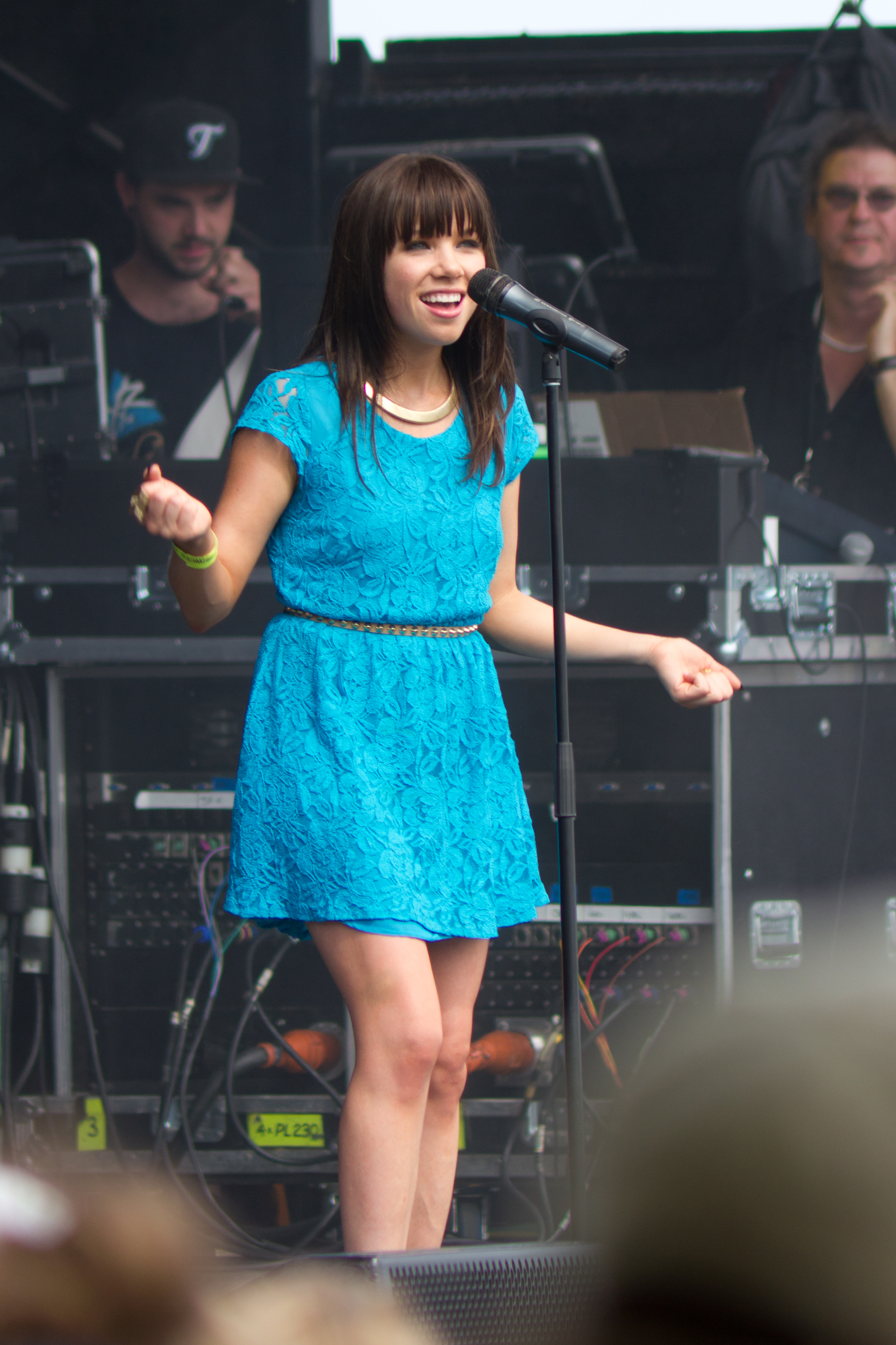
Canadian singer Carly Rae Jepsen achieved the first number one on the Official Audio Streaming Chart with "Call Me Maybe".

The Official Audio Streaming Chart (previously the Official Streaming Chart) is a music chart based on plays of songs through audio streaming services (including Spotify, Deezer, Google Play Music, Apple Music and Tidal) in the United Kingdom. It features data from both premium and ad-supported services. It is compiled weekly by the Official Charts Company (OCC), and was initially published both on their official website OfficialCharts.com (Top 100), and in the magazine Music Week (Top 75).

As of the chart dated 12 July 2014 —the date of inclusion of streaming data into the UK Singles Chart— the Official Streaming Chart was relaunched as the Official Audio Streaming Chart. The Top 100 is published on the OCC website. The first song to top the rebranded chart was "Sing" by Ed Sheeran.

The chart was first launched on 14 May 2012. Its first number one was "Call Me Maybe" by Carly Rae Jepsen. At the time of the chart's launch, the most streamed artist of the year was Ed Sheeran. Sheeran remarked that streaming services had "always been an important way for [him] to get music out to [his] fans". Martin Talbot, managing director of the OCC, stated that the chart represented "a true coming-of-age moment for music streaming in the UK".

In 2015, an Official Albums Streaming Chart was launched. This uses the same streaming sources as the Official Audio Streaming Chart to measure how many times albums have been streamed each week.

== Number ones ==
Key
No.	nth song to top the Official Audio Streaming Chart
re	Return of a song to number one
†	Most-streamed song of the year (Note: In 2012, the most-streamed song of the year was "Somebody That I Used to Know" by Gotye featuring Kimbra, which was released before the Official Streaming Chart was introduced in May.)

No.	Artist (Note: The artist, song, date of reaching number one and number of weeks at number one are those given by the OCC.)	Song	Record label (Note: The record labels are those given by the OCC.)	Reached number one (for the week ending)	Weeks at number one
2012
1	Carly Rae Jepsen	"Call Me Maybe"	Interscope	19 May 2012	2
2	fun. featuring Janelle Monáe	"We Are Young"	Atlantic/Fueled by Ramen	2 June 2012	4
3	Flo Rida	"Whistle"	Atlantic	30 June 2012	2
4	Maroon 5 featuring Wiz Khalifa	"Payphone"	A&M/Octone	14 July 2012	5
5	Florence and the Machine	"Spectrum (Say My Name)"	Island	18 August 2012	1
6	Wiley featuring Ms D	"Heatwave"	One More Tune/Warner Bros.	24 August 2012	3
re	Florence and the Machine	"Spectrum (Say My Name)"	Island	15 September 2012	1
7	Taylor Swift	"We Are Never Ever Getting Back Together"	Mercury	22 September 2012	1
8	The Script featuring will.i.am	"Hall of Fame"	Epic/Phonogenic	29 September 2012	2
9	Psy	"Gangnam Style"	Island	13 October 2012	3
10	Rihanna	"Diamonds"	Def Jam	3 November 2012	1
11	Swedish House Mafia featuring John Martin	"Don't You Worry Child"	Virgin	17 November 2012	1
12	Labrinth featuring Emeli Sandé	"Beneath Your Beautiful"	Syco	24 November 2012	4
13	Bruno Mars	"Locked Out of Heaven"	Atlantic	22 December 2012	1
14	Olly Murs	"Troublemaker"	Epic	29 December 2012	1
2013
15	James Arthur	"Impossible"	Syco	5 January 2013	3
16	will.i.am featuring Britney Spears	"Scream & Shout"	Interscope	26 January 2013	3
17	Macklemore & Ryan Lewis featuring Wanz	"Thrift Shop"	Macklemore	16 February 2013	4
18	Bastille	"Pompeii"	Virgin	16 March 2013	7
19	Daft Punk featuring Pharrell Williams	"Get Lucky" †	Columbia	4 May 2013	7
20	Robin Thicke featuring T.I. and Pharrell Williams	"Blurred Lines"	Interscope	22 June 2013	6
21	Avicii featuring Aloe Blacc	"Wake Me Up"	Positiva/PRMD	3 August 2013	7
22	Katy Perry	"Roar"	Virgin	21 September 2013	3
23	OneRepublic	"Counting Stars"	Interscope	12 October 2013	5
24	Lorde	"Royals"	Virgin	16 November 2013	1
25	Eminem featuring Rihanna	"The Monster"	Interscope	23 November 2013	6
2014
26	Mariah Carey	"All I Want for Christmas Is You"	Columbia	4 January 2014	1
27	Pharrell Williams	"Happy"	Columbia	11 January 2014	1
28	Pitbull featuring Kesha	"Timber"	J/Mr. 305/Polo Grounds	18 January 2014	3
29	Clean Bandit featuring Jess Glynne	"Rather Be" †	Atlantic	8 February 2014	10
30	John Legend	"All of Me"	Columbia	19 April 2014	1
re	Clean Bandit featuring Jess Glynne	"Rather Be" †	Atlantic	26 April 2014	1
re	John Legend	"All of Me"	Columbia	3 May 2014	1
31	Mr Probz	"Waves"	Left Lane	10 May 2014	8
32	Ed Sheeran	"Sing"	Asylum	5 July 2014	3 (Note: "Sing"'s second week at number one was the first publication of the Official Audio Streaming Chart.)
33	Ariana Grande featuring Iggy Azalea	"Problem"	Republic	26 July 2014	2
34	Magic!	"Rude"	RCA	9 August 2014	5
35	Lilly Wood & Robin Schulz	"Prayer in C"	Atlantic	13 September 2014	3
36	Calvin Harris featuring John Newman	"Blame"	Columbia	4 October 2014	1
37	Meghan Trainor	"All About That Bass"	Epic	11 October 2014	1
38	Taylor Swift	"Shake It Off"	EMI	18 October 2014	1
re	Meghan Trainor	"All About That Bass"	Epic	25 October 2014	2
39	Ed Sheeran	"Thinking Out Loud"	Atlantic	8 November 2014	7
40	Mark Ronson featuring Bruno Mars	"Uptown Funk"	Columbia	27 December 2014	8
2015
41	Ellie Goulding	"Love Me Like You Do"	Polydor	21 February 2015	4
42	Rihanna, Kanye West and Paul McCartney	"FourFiveSeconds"	Roc Nation	21 March 2015	3
43	Years & Years	"King"	Polydor	11 April 2015	2
44	Wiz Khalifa featuring Charlie Puth	"See You Again"	Atlantic	25 April 2015	2
45	OMI	"Cheerleader" †	Ultra	9 May 2015	8
46	Major Lazer and DJ Snake featuring MØ	"Lean On"	Because	4 July 2015	2
47	Lost Frequencies	"Are You with Me"	AATW	16 July 2015	4
re	Major Lazer and DJ Snake featuring MØ	"Lean On"	Because	13 August 2015	1
48	Calvin Harris and Disciples	"How Deep Is Your Love"	Columbia	20 August 2015	3
49	Justin Bieber	"What Do You Mean?"	Def Jam	10 September 2015	8
50	Adele	"Hello"	XL	5 November 2015	3
51	Justin Bieber	"Sorry"	Def Jam	26 November 2015	2
52	Justin Bieber	"Love Yourself"	Def Jam	10 December 2015	8
2016
53	Shawn Mendes	"Stitches"	EMI	4 February 2016	1
54	Zayn	"Pillowtalk"	RCA	11 February 2016	2
55	Lukas Graham	"7 Years"	Warner Bros.	25 February 2016	2
56	Rihanna featuring Drake	"Work"	Roc Nation	10 March 2016	1
re	Lukas Graham	"7 Years"	Warner Bros.	17 March 2016	2
57	Mike Posner	"I Took a Pill in Ibiza" (SeeB remix)	Island	31 March 2016	4
58	Drake featuring Wizkid & Kyla †	"One Dance"	Cash Money / Republic	28 April 2016	14
59	Major Lazer featuring Justin Bieber & MØ	"Cold Water"	Because Music	5 August 2016	6
60	The Chainsmokers featuring Halsey	"Closer"	Disruptor	16 September 2016	4
61	James Arthur	"Say You Won't Let Go"	Columbia	14 October 2016	3
62	Little Mix	"Shout Out to My Ex"	Syco Music	4 November 2016	1
re	James Arthur	"Say You Won't Let Go"	Columbia	11 November 2016	2
63	Clean Bandit featuring Anne-Marie & Sean Paul	"Rockabye"	Atlantic	25 November 2016	6
2017
re	Mariah Carey	"All I Want for Christmas Is You"	Columbia	5 January 2017	1
re	Clean Bandit featuring Anne-Marie & Sean Paul	"Rockabye"	Atlantic	12 January 2017	1
64	Ed Sheeran	"Shape of You" †	Atlantic	19 January 2017	17
65	DJ Khaled featuring Justin Bieber, Quavo, Lil Wayne & Chance The Rapper	"I'm the One"	Black Butter/Def Jam	18 May 2017	1
66	Luis Fonsi featuring Daddy Yankee & Justin Bieber	"Despacito" (Remix)	Def Jam/RBMG/Republic/UMLE	25 May 2017	14
67	Dua Lipa	"New Rules"	Warner	31 August 2017	1
68	Taylor Swift	"Look What You Made Me Do"	Universal	7 September 2017	1
re	Dua Lipa	"New Rules"	Warner	14 September 2017	3
69	Post Malone featuring 21 Savage	"Rockstar"	Republic	5 October 2017	10
70	Ed Sheeran	"Perfect"	Asylum	14 December 2017	2
71	Eminem and Ed Sheeran	"River"	Interscope	28 December 2017	1
2018
72	Wham!	"Last Christmas"	RCA	4 January 2018	1
re	Ed Sheeran	"Perfect"	Asylum	11 January 2018	3
73	Drake	"God's Plan" †	Republic/Cash Money	1 February 2018	11
74	Drake	"Nice for What"	Republic/Cash Money	19 April 2018	2
75	Calvin Harris and Dua Lipa	"One Kiss"	Columbia/Warner	3 May 2018	10
76	Drake featuring Michael Jackson	"Don't Matter to Me"	Cash Money/Republic	12 July 2018	1
77	Baddiel, Skinner and The Lightning Seeds	"Three Lions"	Epic	19 July 2018	1
78	Drake	"In My Feelings"	Cash Money/Republic	26 July 2018	6
79	Benny Blanco, Halsey and Khalid	"Eastside"	Interscope	6 September 2018	6
80	Dave and Fredo	"Funky Friday"	Dave/Neighbourhood	18 October 2018	4
81	Ariana Grande	"Thank U, Next"	Republic	15 November 2018	5
re	Mariah Carey	"All I Want for Christmas Is You"	Columbia	20 December 2018	3
2019
82	Ava Max	"Sweet But Psycho"	Atlantic	10 January 2019	3
83	Ariana Grande	"7 Rings"	Republic	31 January 2019	5
84	Ariana Grande	"Break Up with Your Girlfriend, I'm Bored"	Republic	1 March 2019	1
85	Lewis Capaldi	"Someone You Loved" †	EMI	8 March 2019	5
86	Lil Nas X	"Old Town Road"	Lil Nas X	18 April 2019	3
87	Stormzy	"Vossi Bop"	Merky	9 May 2019	2
88	Ed Sheeran and Justin Bieber	"I Don't Care"	Asylum	23 May 2019	1
re	Lil Nas X	"Old Town Road"	Lil Nas X	30 May 2019	7
89	Shawn Mendes and Camila Cabello	"Señorita"	EMI/Syco	12 July 2019	1
90	Ed Sheeran and Khalid	"Beautiful People"	Asylum	19 July 2019	1
re	Shawn Mendes and Camila Cabello	"Señorita"	EMI/Syco	26 July 2019	5
91	Ed Sheeran and Stormzy	"Take Me Back to London"	Asylum	5 September 2019	6
92	Tones and I	"Dance Monkey"	Bad Batch	17 October 2019	9
re	Mariah Carey	"All I Want for Christmas Is You"	Columbia	19 December 2019	3

== See also ==
- List of Official Subscription Plays Chart number ones
