= Elina (musician) =

Swedish singer/songwriter

- Born: Elina Stridh; 16 March 1994 (age 31); Stockholm, Sweden
- Genres: Pop, folk-pop
- Occupations: Songwriter, singer
- Instruments: Vocals, guitar, piano
- Labels: Stereoscope Music Scandinavia, BLNK Music
- Awards: 2018 ASCAP Pop Award, Song of the Year at Swedish Publishing Awards

Elina Stridh (born 16 March 1994), known mononymously as Elina, is a Swedish singer-songwriter. Elina's songwriting credits include the Billboard top 10 hit "What Lovers Do" by Maroon 5 featuring SZA and the multiplatinum single "Sexual" by Neiked featuring Dyo. Elina started releasing her own music in 2018.

== Life and career ==
Elina grew up in a small village outside of Stockholm, Sweden. She learned guitar in eighth grade and attended the Swedish songwriting academy Musikmakarna. In 2013, she signed with Stereoscope Music Scandinavia.

Elina has co-written songs for numerous musical artists, including Maroon 5, Neiked, Zara Larsson, and Astrid S. She won the 2018 ASCAP Pop Award for her work on "What Lovers Do" by Maroon 5 featuring SZA and Song of the Year at the Swedish Publishing Awards for her work on “Sexual” by Neiked featuring Dyo. She was also a finalist in the Rookie Songwriter/Producer category at the Denniz Pop Awards in 2015 and nominated for Best Contemporary Song at the Ivor Novello Awards for "Sexual" in 2018.

In 2018 Elina released her first solo single, "Wild Enough", about not feeling good enough. The song won first place in the International Songwriting Competition's performance category. Her debut EP, Hindsight, came out in May 2019 through BLNK Music and received 60 million streams within its first year. She debuted as an independent artist in 2021 with "Love Come Around".

Between her solo work and collaborations, Elina has garnered more than 1 billion streams.
