= Snakes & Ladders (Wiley album) =

Studio album by Wiley
- Released: 3 November 2014
- Recorded: 2014
- Genre: Grime; british hip hop
- Length: 63:24
- Label: Big Dada
- Producer: Wiley, Skepta

Wiley chronology
The Ascent (2013)	Snakes & Ladders (2014)	Godfather (2017)

Singles from Snakes & Ladders
- 1. "On a Level" Released: 25 September 2014

Professional ratings
Review scores
Source	Rating
Clash	8/10
Complex	3.5/5 stars
God is in the TV	4/5 stars
NME	8/10
State	3/5 stars

Snakes & Ladders is the tenth studio album by British rapper Wiley. The album's features include JME, Flirta D, Stormzy, Solo 45, J Writer, Problem, Gudda Gudda, Cam'ron, Footsie, Wrigz, J2K, Double S, Maxsta, Chip, and Hollow Da Don. Wiley announced via Twitter that it would be his last solo album, however his next album, Godfather (2017), originally became his last studio album until Wiley announced on 3 November 2017 that he had a change of heart and released a new album, titled Godfather II, on 27 April 2018.

== Track listing ==
No.	Title	Producer(s)	Length
1.	"Snakes & Ladders (Part One)"	Jay Weathers	1:24
2.	"On a Level"	Skepta	3:03
3.	"From the Outside" (featuring Teddy and Jme)	Teddy	3:01
4.	"No Skylarking"	Zdot	2:48
5.	"Busy"	G Tank	3:28
6.	"Drive By" (featuring Flirta D)	Danny Yen	2:46
7.	"Badman"	Zdot	2:48
8.	"Step 21"	Masro	3:16
9.	"Grew Up In" (featuring Stormzy and Solo 45)	Maniac	3:27
10.	"Lonely" (featuring J.R. Writer, Problem, Gudda Gudda and Cam'ron)	Beatboy	5:06
11.	"BMO Field"	Zdot	3:45
12.	"Reel Off" (featuring Footsie and Wrigz)	Footsie	3:39
13.	"Bloodtype" (featuring Wrigz)	Fly the Producer	3:26
14.	"Flying (Zdot Remix)" (featuring Chip)	Zdot	4:23
15.	"What’s On Ya Mind?"	Terror Danjah	4:19
16.	"Hollow Da Don - Bars"	--	1:21
17.	"Snakes & Ladders (Part Two)"	Jay Weathers	11:24
Total length:			63:24

Hidden bonus tracks – after track 17
No.	Title	Producer(s)	Length
18.	"Born in the Cold" (featuring Andreena Mill)	Kid D	3:12
19.	"And Again" (featuring God's Gift)	Danny Yen	2:50
20.	"Fuck It"	Deeco	3:37

== Accolades ==
Publication/Author	Country	Accolade	Year	Rank
Clash	United Kingdom	Top 40 Albums of 2014	2014	26
Gigwise	United Kingdom	50 Best Albums of 2014	2014	18
