= Sexual (song) =

- Original artwork. The iTunes artwork depicts the same picture, pixellated.

Single by Neiked featuring Dyo

from the album Best of Hard Drive
- Released: 26 August 2016
- Recorded: 2015–2016
- Genre: Pop; dance-pop
- Length: 3:08
- Label: Neiked Collective; Casablanca; Polydor; Republic; Universal
- Songwriters: Victor Rådström; Dayo Olatunji; Elina Stridh
- Producer: Victor Rådström

Neiked singles chronology
"Sand & Lead" (2016)	"Sexual" (2016)	"Call Me" (2017)

Dyo singles chronology
"Reload" (2013)	"Sexual" (2016)

"Sexual" (also known as "Sensual" in censored versions) is a song by Swedish collective Neiked featuring vocals from English singer Dyo. It was released for digital download on 26 August 2016 through Neiked Collective, Casablanca Records, Polydor Records and Republic Records.

== Composition ==
"Sexual" is a high-energy pop track and has been described as having elements of funk.

== Critical reception ==
Mike Wass of Idolator described the song as a "future hit" and claimed that Dyo's vocals sounded like "Kiiara [if she] took a handful of happy pills".

== Commercial performance ==
The song was a commercial success in the United Kingdom and Australia. On the UK Singles Chart dated 8 September 2016, the song debuted at number 83. Eight weeks later, on the chart dated 3 November 2016, the song rose to number 6, becoming Neiked's first top ten hit, and Dyo's fifth. On its fifteen-week on the chart, dated 15 December 2016, the song moved to number five, becoming Dyo's fourth top five hit. On the Australian Singles Chart dated 6 November 2016, "Sexual" debuted at number 33. On the chart dated 21 November 2016, it rose to number four, where it peaked. It met a huge success in some European countries, peaking the top ten in Spain, Belgium and Norway.

== Interpolations and remixes ==
=== Maroon 5 ===
Maroon 5's 2017 single "What Lovers Do" contains interpolations of "Sexual", so Victor Rådström, Elina Stridh and Dyo are credited as songwriters.

=== Oliver Nelson Remix ===
In response to the Oliver Nelson remix of the song, Perez Hilton described the song as "killer" and that he predicted it was "soon to be burning up dancefloors worldwide".

== Charts ==
=== Weekly charts ===
Weekly chart performance for "Sexual"
Chart (2016–17)	Peak position
Australia (ARIA)	4
Austria (Ö3 Austria Top 40)	53
Belgium (Ultratop 50 Flanders)	7
Belgium Dance (Ultratop Flanders)	1
Belgium (Ultratop 50 Wallonia)	10
Belgium Dance (Ultratop Wallonia)	1
Czech Republic Airplay (ČNS IFPI)	17
Czech Republic Singles Digital (ČNS IFPI)	24
Denmark (Tracklisten)	22
France (SNEP)	23
Germany (GfK)	43
Ireland (IRMA)	2
Netherlands (Global Top 40)	39
Netherlands (Single Top 100)	43
Netherlands (Tipparade)	1
New Zealand (Recorded Music NZ)	6
Norway (VG-lista)	9
Poland (Polish Airplay Top 100)	64
Portugal (AFP)	47
Scotland Singles (OCC)	3
Slovakia Singles Digital (ČNS IFPI)	50
Spain (Promusicae)	10
Sweden (Sverigetopplistan)	32
Switzerland (Schweizer Hitparade)	98
UK Singles (OCC)	5
US Hot Dance/Electronic Songs (Billboard)	22

=== Year-end charts ===
Year-end chart rankings for "Sexual"
Chart (2016)	Position
Australia (ARIA)	81
Netherlands (Global Top 40)	98
UK Singles (Official Charts Company)	51
Chart (2017)	Position
Australia (ARIA)	96
Belgium (Ultratop Flanders)	63
Belgium (Ultratop Wallonia)	61
France (SNEP)	150
Spain Airplay (PROMUSICAE)	8
UK Singles (Official Charts Company)	58
US Hot Dance/Electronic Songs (Billboard)	76

== Certifications ==
Region	Certification	Certified units/sales
Australia (ARIA)	3× Platinum	210,000^{‡}
Belgium (BRMA)	Platinum	20,000^{‡}
Brazil (Pro-Música Brasil)	Gold	30,000^{‡}
Denmark (IFPI Danmark)	Platinum	90,000^{‡}
France (SNEP)	Platinum	133,333^{‡}
Germany (BVMI)	Gold	200,000^{‡}
Italy (FIMI)	Gold	25,000^{‡}
New Zealand (RMNZ)	3× Platinum	90,000^{‡}
Norway (IFPI Norway)	Platinum	40,000^{‡}
Spain (Promusicae)	Gold	20,000^{‡}
United Kingdom (BPI)	3× Platinum	1,800,000^{‡}
^{‡} Sales+streaming figures based on certification alone.

== Release history ==
Country	Date	Format	Label	Ref.
Various	26 August 2016	Digital download	Neiked Collective; Polydor	
Italy	2 September 2016	Contemporary hit radio	Universal	
United States	8 November 2016	Rhythmic contemporary	Republic	
