= Godfather (album) =

Studio album by Wiley
- Released: 13 January 2017
- Recorded: 2015–September 2016
- Genre: Grime
- Length: 57:45
- Label: CTA Records
- Producers: Wiley (also exec.); CJ Beats; Darq E Freaker; JLSXND7RS; Kid D; Mr Virgo; Maniac; Mucky; Morfius; NoizBoiz; Preditah; Rude Kid; Scratchy; Swifta Beater; Teddy; Teeza; Zeph Ellis

Wiley chronology
Snakes & Ladders (2014)	Godfather (2017)	Godfather II (2018)

Singles from Godfather
- 1. "Can't Go Wrong" Released: 15 September 2016; 2. "Bring Them All / Holy Grime" Released: 13 October 2016; 3. "U Were Always, Pt. 2" Released: 25 November 2016; 4. "Speakerbox" Released: 6 January 2017

Godfather is the eleventh studio album by English grime MC Wiley. It was released on 13 January 2017 through CTA Records, a record label venture between Wiley and Logan Sama and is distributed by Warner Music Group. It succeeds the album Snakes & Ladders (2014), originally announced as Wiley's final album.

The album features guest appearances from numerous MCs, including Skepta, Devlin, Jme, Ghetts, Chip, P Money, Lethal Bizzle, among others. Production derives from Wiley himself, Preditah, Swifta Beater, Rude Kid, Darq E Freaker and Teeza. It was originally slated to be Wiley's last solo album to be released until he announced on 3 November 2017 the release of a new album called Godfather II on 27 April 2018.

The album was supported by four singles: "Can't Go Wrong", "Bring Them All / Holy Grime" featuring Devlin, "U Were Always, Pt. 2" featuring Skepta and Belly, and "Speakerbox". The album received critical acclaim from critics, while peaking at number 9 on the UK Albums Chart. It became Wiley's highest-charting album of his career after succeeding the peak of The Ascent (2013).

== Background ==
The album was announced in March 2016 via Twitter, along with a release date of September 2. However, the album was delayed to early 2017 after being cancelled altogether. The album name is a reference to the media title of Wiley as the "Godfather of Grime", a title that he has been reluctant to adopt until Godfather: "I was battling [the title of Godfather] for ages. I didn't want to take it on. But you know what, one day I woke up and I said: 'this title actually means a lot and I need to actually put some respect on its name, stop trying to push it away.'"

Godfather was originally dubbed as Wiley's last solo studio album release, claiming that "This is the end of my career, in terms of proving anything. After this, I don't have to prove anything to anybody. It's not my job any more to jump around and try being the number one guy, up in everyone’s faces at Rinse FM, at Radar Radio. It's the next generation's job." However, on 3 November 2017, he announced that he had a change of heart and will now release a new album, titled Godfather II, on 27 April 2018.

== Composition ==
Godfather serves as a complete return to grime for Wiley for a high-profiled release. NME described the album's sound as "a pop-free rampage through ‘Eskimo’-era beats, monstrous, gnarled bass and even the odd spot of smooth, loverman Rhythm N Grime."

== Promotion ==
In December 2015, the song "P Money" was released online via a music video. The song was later remixed featuring the artist the song title references, P Money, and included as a bonus track on Godfather.

The lead single, "Can't Go Wrong", was released on 15 September 2016. The second single, "Bring Them All / Holy Grime" featuring Devlin was released on 13 October 2016. The third single, "U Were Always, Pt. 2" featuring Skepta and Belly, was released on 25 November 2016. The album's fourth single, "Speakerbox", was released on 6 January 2017.

Two non-album promotional singles were released that were originally on the album: "6 in the Morning", released on 9 December 2016, and "Handle Ya Business", released on the album's release day.

== Critical reception ==
Professional ratings
Aggregate scores
Source	Rating
AnyDecentMusic?	8.0/10
Metacritic	84/100
Review scores
Source	Rating
AllMusic	4/5 stars
Clash	8/10
Exclaim!	6/10
Financial Times	4/5 stars
The Guardian	4/5 stars
The Irish Times	4/5 stars
NME	5/5 stars
The Observer	4/5 stars
Pitchfork	7.4/10
Q	4/5 stars

Godfather received widespread acclaim from critics. At Metacritic, which assigns a normalized rating out of 100 to reviews from mainstream publications, the album received an average score of 84, based on 11 reviews. Jordan Bassett of NME stated that "It’s a statement of intent: Wiley has come to reclaim the genre that he helped to create more than a decade ago". Ben Beaumont-Thomas of The Guardian commented that "his demeanor on this blockbuster album is of a foreman nodding with satisfaction as he looks across a building site". Nathan Fisher of The 405 commented: "The energy generated throughout Godfather is evocative of the genre’s prime years, as Wiley, with assistance from a multitude of producers (JME, Preditah, Rude Kid & Kid D, to name just a few), astutely bridge the gap between Grime’s generations. The smooth, seamless combination of the conventional Grime sounds (‘Speakerbox’, ‘Bang’ and ‘On This’) with the modern, popular Trap sound (‘Joe Bloggs’), results in tracks like ‘Birds n Bars’ bringing a successful balance between the two. If Grime’s resurgence was missing anything, Godfather has gone some way to being the final ingredient by evoking the limitless energy that the genre was built on. Wiley has curated a project that binds the generations of Grime and acts as the final confirmation of the genre’s return."

== Commercial performance ==
Godfather entered and peaked at number 9 on the UK Albums Chart for chart week 20 January 2017. It became Wiley's highest-charting album of his career, and second top 40 album, surpassing the peak of The Ascent (2013) which peaked at number 26. However, Godfather charted at number 1 on the UK R&B Chart and number 3 on the UK Independent Chart.

== Track listing ==
No.	Title	Writer(s)	Producer(s)	Length
1.	"Birds n Bars"	Cowie	Wiley; Teeza; Preditah	6:30
2.	"Bring Them All / Holy Grime" (featuring Devlin)	Cowie; James Devlin; Matthew Virgo	Mr Virgo	3:17
3.	"Name Brand" (featuring Jme, Frisco & J2K)	Cowie; Jamie Adenuga; Deshane Cornwall; Jason Black	Jme	3:42
4.	"Speakerbox"	Cowie	Mucky; NoizBoiz	3:12
5.	"Back with a Banger"	Cowie	Preditah	3:03
6.	"Joe Bloggs" (featuring Newham Generals & President T)	Cowie; Darren Dixon; Daniel Carnegie; President T	Rude Kid	3:27
7.	"Pattern Up Properly" (featuring Flowdan & Jamakabi)	Cowie; Marc Veira; Anthony Harris	Teddy	2:47
8.	"Can't Go Wrong"	Cowie	Darq E Freaker	3:04
9.	"Bang" (featuring Ghetts)	Cowie; Justin Clarke	Maniac	2:59
10.	"U Were Always, Pt. 2" (featuring Skepta & Belly)	Cowie; Joseph Adenuga; Belly	Kid D	3:36
11.	"On This" (featuring Chip, Ice Kid & Little D)	Cowie; Jahmaal Fyffe; Ice Kid; Dean Douglas	CJ Beats	3:40
12.	"Bait Face" (featuring Scratchy)	Cowie; Scratchy	Scratchy; Wiley	2:47
13.	"My Direction" (featuring Lethal Bizzle)	Cowie; Maxwell Ansah	JLSXND7RS	2:46
14.	"Like It or Not" (featuring Breeze)	Cowie; Breeze	Swifta Beater	3:06
15.	"Lucid"	Cowie	Zeph Ellis	3:40
16.	"Laptop" (featuring Manga)	Cowie; Matthew Reid	Morfius	2:58
17.	"P Money (Remix)" (featuring P Money) (bonus track)	Cowie; Paris Moore-Williams	Teeza	3:01
Total length:				57:45

Notes

- The bonus track "P Money (Remix)" appears on all versions of the album.
- The track "Bring Them All" appears on the first track after "Birds n Bars", and not at the beginning of the second track as listed on all versions of the tracklisting.

Sample credits

- "U Were Always, Pt. 2" contains a sample of "Fine Time", performed by SWV.

== Charts ==
Chart (2017)	Peak position
New Zealand Heatseekers Albums (RMNZ)	3
Scottish Albums (Official Charts)	53
UK Independent Albums (Official Charts)	3
UK R&B Albums (Official Charts)	1
UK Albums (Official Charts)	9

== Release history ==
Country	Date	Label	Format
United Kingdom	13 January 2017	Chasing the Art	CD; digital download
United States	27 January 2017	Chasing the Art	CD; digital download
