= Reload (Wiley song) =

2013 single by Wiley

Single by Wiley featuring Chip

from the album The Ascent
- Released: 15 February 2013
- Genre: Drum and bass
- Length: 3:13
- Label: Warner Music
- Songwriter(s): Richard Cowie, Jahmaal Fyffe, Dayo Olatunji, Talay Riley
- Producer(s): Scribz

Wiley singles chronology
"Animal" (2013)	"Reload" (2013)	"They Got It Wrong" (2013)

Chip singles chronology
"Teardrop" (2011)	"Reload" (2013)

Ms D singles chronology
"Can You Hear Me? (Ayayaya)" (2012)	"Reload" (2013)	"Sexual" (2016)

"Reload" is a song by British grime artist Wiley, featuring vocals by Chip and uncredited vocals by Ms D. It was released as the third single from his ninth studio album The Ascent on 15 February 2013 for digital download in the United Kingdom. The song was written by Richard Cowie, Jahmaal Fyffe, Dayo Olatunji, Talay Riley and produced by Scribz. It was the first single to feature Chipmunk's new stage name, Chip, and the last single when Ms. D was known as such, to which she then changed to Dyo.

== Music video ==
A music video to accompany the release of "Reload" was first released onto YouTube on 28 January 2013 at a total length of three minutes and seventeen seconds.

== Track listing ==
Digital download (Remixes)
No.	Title	Length
1.	"Reload" (featuring Chip) (Radio Edit)	3:13
2.	"Reload" (featuring Chip) (Wilkinson Remix)	4:19
3.	"Reload" (featuring Chip) (Cadenza Remix)	4:07
4.	"Reload" (featuring Chip) (Bill & Will Remix)	6:00
5.	"Reload" (featuring Chip) (Pantha Remix)	3:15
6.	"Reload" (featuring Chip) (Instrumental Mix)	3:31

== Credits and personnel ==
- Vocals – Wiley, Chip, Ms D
- Producer – Scribz
- Lyrics – Richard Cowie, Jahmaal Fyffe, Dayo Olatunji, Talay Riley
- Label: Warner Music

== Charts ==
=== Weekly charts ===
Chart (2013)	Peak position
Czech Republic (Rádio – Top 100)	80
Scotland (OCC)	10
Slovakia (Rádio Top 100)	63
UK Singles (OCC)	9

=== Year-end charts ===
Chart (2013)	Position
UK Singles (Official Charts Company)	155

== Certifications ==
Region	Certification	Certified units/sales
United Kingdom (BPI)	Silver	200,000^{‡}
^{‡} Sales+streaming figures based on certification alone.

== Release history ==
Country	Date	Format	Label
United Kingdom	15 February 2013	Digital download	Warner Music
