= Darq E Freaker =

- Born: 14 February 1988 (age 38); Peckham, London, England
- Genres: Grime, electronic, hip hop
- Occupations: Musician, record producer
- Years active: 2008–present
- Labels: Big Dada, Numbers, Tru Thoughts, Oil Gang, Southern Hospitality
- Website: Personal

Darq E Freaker (born Jeremiah Valentino Ntéh, 14 February 1988) is an English electronic music record producer and DJ from Peckham, London, England. He is best known for his work with and as a member of grime collective Nu Brand Flexxx. Freaker has released multiple EPs, most notably "Cherryade" on Oil Gang and "Blueberry" which featured Danny Brown. Freaker released 'Minger" on UK record label Numbers in June 2014.

== Biography ==
Infusing UK Grime and Hip-Hop with Capcom-esque electronica, Freaker's unique style of grime caught the attention of English grime MC Tempa T in 2012. Rising from local notoriety after the release of Tempa T's "Next Hype", Freaker went on to collaborate with then freshman Detroit rapper Danny Brown, on the critically acclaimed "Blueberry (Cocaine & Pills) EP". Freaker later produced a track entitled "Handstand" for Brown's fourth album, Old, and most recently worked with Wiley to produce the lead single 'Can't Go Wrong' from Wiley's latest album 'Godfather'.

In addition to his solo work, Freaker leads Nu Brand Flexxx, a London-based grime collective composed of rappers Boyadee, Wonder and Peigh. Freaker both produced and rapped on the group's 2012 premiere release, The Trip EP. Additionally, Freaker has collaborated with Scissor Sisters, remixing their 2012 single Baby Come Home, the third single off their fourth studio album Magic Hour. Freaker has also worked with British indie trio London Grammar, Oakland rapper Gita and M.I.A.'s protege Afrikan Boy.

== Discography ==
=== Production ===
- Can't Go Wrong – Wiley (Godfather, 2017)
- Handstand – Danny Brown (Old, 2013)
- Mardi Gras – Gita (Escaping The Dream World, 2013)
- Next Hype – Tempa T (2009)

=== EPs ===
- ADHD (Big Dada, 2016)
- 924 (Boogaloo City, 2012)
- Blueberry (Pills & Cocaine) feat. Danny Brown EP (Southern Hospitality, 2012)
- The Horus (Avalanche Music, 2010)

=== Mixtapes ===
- Places + Faces Sounds:The + Tape (2017)
- Don't Freak Out (2016)

=== Singles ===
- "Minger" (Numbers, 2013)
- "Ironside" (Tru Thoughts, 2014)
- "Trojan" (Big Dada, 2013)
- "Cherryade" (Oil Gang, 2011)

== Notes ==
- Freaker appears in the music videos for "Blueberry," "Cherryade," "Minger" and for Gita's "Mardi Gras."
