= Old (Danny Brown album) =

Studio album by Danny Brown
- Released: October 8, 2013
- Recorded: 2012–2013
- Studio: The Kitchen (Detroit); Kingsway (Toronto); The Space Pit (Brooklyn); The Toy Shop (London)
- Genre: Alternative hip-hop
- Length: 56:36
- Label: Fool's Gold; Goliath
- Producer: A-Trak; BadBadNotGood; Corin Roddick; Darq E Freaker; Frank Dukes; JMIKE; Oh No; Paul White; Rustie; Skywlkr

Danny Brown chronology
Black and Brown! (2011)	Old (2013)	Atrocity Exhibition (2016)

Singles from Old
- 1. "Dip" Released: October 23, 2013; 2. "25 Bucks" Released: April 14, 2014; 3. "Smokin & Drinkin" Released: July 18, 2014

Old is the second studio album and major label debut by American rapper Danny Brown. It was released on October 8, 2013, by Fool's Gold Records and Goliath Management. The album is Brown's first project to be officially sold through music outlets and digital retailers, whereas his previous projects were self-released for free and made available online.

Old includes production from American, British and Canadian record producers such as A-Trak, BadBadNotGood, Frank Dukes, Oh No, Paul White, Rustie and Skywlkr, among others. The album also features guest appearances from fellow artists such as Freddie Gibbs, ASAP Rocky, Schoolboy Q, Ab-Soul, Scrufizzer, Charli XCX and Purity Ring. It was supported by three singles, "Dip", "25 Bucks" and "Smokin & Drinkin".

The album received widespread acclaim from critics, and debuted at number 18 on the US Billboard 200, selling 15,000 copies in the first week.

== Background ==
In August 2012, it was rumored that Brown was working on a new album entitled Danny Johnson, to be entirely produced by Johnson&Jonson (Blu and Mainframe), however, Brown later denied these rumors and confirmed that the album had already been released for free in 2010 under the title It's a Art. On October 24, 2012, Brown released a music video for a song titled "Witit", taken from the deluxe edition of XXX and his OD EP, later that day after Complex kept referring to his next album as Danny Johnson, Brown took to Twitter to reveal the correct tentative title to be ODB, referencing late Wu-Tang Clan member Ol' Dirty Bastard, with whom Brown is often compared.

In December 2012, Brown announced ODB had been completed. He explained that the album won't be as consistently humorous as his previous, XXX, but said that people will be surprised with the outcome: "The new album is done. We're pretty much just figuring out a way of presenting the right way to get released...the title of the album for now is ODB. I can't really elaborate on what that means until the album comes out, and then they'll get it. I don't want to give too much because then it'll be a much more rewarding listen for my fans." He later continued, "It's a rewarding listen when I listen to it. I don't know if I laugh as much - I think I laugh when it's over with, and that's the difference between this album and XXX. With XXX, you laugh throughout it, and by the time it was over with, you were like, 'Oh that wasn't too funny.' This one, when it's over, you're laughing hysterically...it's not necessarily what's being said on the album, but the album [itself], like, 'I can't believe he made this.'"

On December 17, 2012, in an interview with Pitchfork, Brown revealed the album would actually be titled Old. The album, issued under Fool's Gold, which Danny Brown signed to back in March 2011, was his first solo project released to music retailers, unlike any of his previous releases. In December, Brown also said it's about "75% done" and in the mixing stages. He went on to announce include contributions from the likes of ASAP Rocky, Schoolboy Q, Ab-Soul, Kitty and Purity Ring, that latter of whom contributed production, along with a hook from vocalist Megan James.

In January 2013, Brown revealed that much like how XXX sounded very specifically and consciously sequenced to form a narrative, he approached Old in almost the same way: "I always try to act like I'm some old school artist from the 1960s, so I approached this album like I was making it for vinyl: There's a side A and a side B. The way I look at it, I've always been two different artists anyway; I do that underground hip-hop shit and that turned-up trap shit. XXX told a story, so I wanted this one to be like "Curb Your Enthusiasm"-- it's random and all over the place, but by the end it comes together."

On March 23, 2013, it was announced Brown signed a management deal with Goliath Artists, which also houses names such as Eminem, The Alchemist, Blink-182 and most recently Action Bronson, who has previously collaborated with Brown. In June, Brown also explained the meaning behind titling his album Old:

"With 'Old' you think I'm talking about my age, or where I'm at in my career. But it really [refers to] when I'm experimenting, making songs with Darq E Freaker and stuff, and then when I go back to my 'hood, I have my people who be like, 'Where that 'Old' Danny Brown shit at? I wanna hear that J Dilla Danny Brown.' So I [titled the] album for them."

In late August, Brown appeared on Sway Calloway's radio show Sway in the Morning, while there and he continued to elaborate on the album's title, stating the title is not really about his age, although he feels he is older than most rappers, he said it's about returning to the original style of the music he once did: "not saying that I have moved away from that style of music, which is sample-based, J Dilla-esque, psychedelic hip-hop, Wu-Tang influence. You know what I'm sayin? And now I do more so of an electronic, grime influence, Dizzee Rascal style. But it's like, I'm from Detroit, that was the both sides of it." In a September 2013, interview with GQ, Brown explained there's a keen difference between artists from his hometown of Detroit and somewhere like New York City, which affects the music that he creates: "In New York, you go out every day and do shit. Detroit, you stay in the house for days. I think it's what makes us experimental. You're trapped inside and bored. My new album is very emotional. It's a party album, but it's dark."

== Recording and production ==
I made XXX with the aim of getting great reviews. And when I started making Old, I was trying to think of artists that came back from getting great reviews and made an album that was just as good– or better! The only group I could really come up with was Radiohead. So if XXX was my OK Computer, then I'd have to make my Kid A next. So I studied Kid A, and I took away that it's not so much about the lyrics as it is about the way the beats feel, so what drives this album is the production. I wanted to have the most amazing beats, but I still want them to sound minimal– it's still gotta sound like a Danny Brown beat. It can't sound like no fucking Kanye orchestra shit. That ain't me. That's why I took so long with making this album. I was waiting for the perfect beats. And I got 'em.

— Danny Brown speaking on the process of recording Old.

In December 2012, Brown announced ODB had been completed. Brown continued stating "it's about 75% done" and in the mixing stages. Brown also revealed the album would include contributions from ASAP Rocky, Schoolboy Q, Ab-Soul, Kitty and Purity Ring, the latter of whom are contributing production along with a hook from vocalist Megan James. On May 3, 2013, Brown added Freddie Gibbs, Mr. MFN eXquire, Scrufizzer and Charli XCX, to the list of guest appearances on the album. He also revealed the production was handled by Paul White, Oh No, Rustie, Skywlkr, A-Trak, Darq E Freaker and Frank Dukes. He collaborated with Charli XCX after being a fan of hers and meeting her through Twitter. He later remixed her song "What I Like", and in turn she contributed to the album.

On April 5, 2013, Brown released a song titled "Express Yourself", inspired by American music producer Diplo's song of the same name. The song, produced by Boulder, Colorado-based producer Trampy, features a fast-paced electronic beat and is a composition about the popular dance craze twerking. Brown dedicated the song "to all the ladies that like to turn up and have fun", in which he raps "Toes on the wall and her ass in the air / And she twerk that thing like she ain't have a care".

In July 2013, Brown stated: "It's pretty much all done. I just have anxiety -- I'm just nervous about it." When asked what will it sound like, Brown replied: "I can't really say what it focuses on, because I don't really know what it focuses on," Brown said earnestly. "I didn't focus on anything -- I just let it write itself. The more I listen to it, it's just like, 'Damn!' It's almost like I didn't really do this shit. It came from a higher power, and as I'm listening to it now, I'm starting to hear things that I didn't even know." He later added: "I'm starting to like it more and more, like a normal listener," he offers. "The first time I listened to it I had a lot of complaints, but I knew that it was the project that I wanted to release, just feeling-wise, not listening-wise. Just doing things with my heart instead of than my brain and my ears."

In July 2013, Brown also revealed a song with Freddie Gibbs, tentatively titled "Return of the Gangsta II", ultimately appearing on the album as "The Return". He stated: "We remade the Outkast song. It's part two." The song he's referring to is "Return of the 'G'", from Outkast's 1998 album Aquemini. The song was produced by Paul White, with Brown declaring "The beat sounds like a fucking haunted house."

== Release and promotion ==
In 2012, from September to November, Brown appeared alongside Schoolboy Q and ASAP Mob, as supporting acts for ASAP Rocky's 40-date national Long. Live. ASAP Tour. In January 2013, it was announced that Brown would be performing at the 2013 Coachella Valley Music and Arts Festival. On March 1, 2013, Brown and Fool's Gold label-mate Baauer, announced their upcoming Worst of Both Worlds Tour. For the trek, the Fool's Gold signees began in Houston, Texas on April 9, 2013, at Fitzgerald's. The brief trek, which only hit the West Coast, made stops in Austin, Texas, Tucson, Arizona and San Francisco, California. They played both weekends of the Coachella Music and Arts Festival, and wrapped up the tour on the second weekend (April 20, 2013). In April, while performing at Coachella, Brown premiered a new unreleased song from the album, performing a track titled "Dope Song".

On March 8, 2013, Brown announced another tour in promotion for his upcoming album, the Old & Reckless Tour, featuring American rapper Kitty. For his first-ever headlining tour, Brown began at South by Southwest (SXSW) on March 15, with a pair of shows. After completing his Worst of Both Worlds trek with Baauer, he was joined by Kitty for stops in St. Louis, Missouri, Ann Arbor, Michigan, New York City, New York and Madison, Wisconsin. The tour concluded at Indianapolis, Indiana's Deluxe on May 14, 2013. On March 18, 2013, Brown revealed in a Twitter post that Old would be released around the same time XXX came out, which was in mid August.

After an unfinished version previously leaked online earlier in 2013, Brown visited Tim Westwood on BBC Radio 1Xtra in June, to premiere the official version of "Kush Coma", the first official offering from Old. In June 2013, Brown wrapped up his Old & Reckless European concert tour and also launched his new website at the same time. To celebrate, he released a stream of the Skywlkr-produced "Kush Coma", featuring Zelooperz (of Brown's Bruiser Brigade) and ASAP Rocky.

On August 12, 2013, via Twitter Brown expressed feeling less than a priority at Fool's Gold Records: "Man #OLD fuck around and never come out ... Smh," tweeted Brown, referring to his forthcoming album, Old. Brown then threatened to leak the album himself: "I'm a fuck around and leak that shit myself if niggas don't get it together." Subsequently, Fool's Gold founder A-Trak, announced that Old is indeed in the label pipeline, with a music video on the way. Later, on August 26, via his Twitter Danny Brown announced that Old would be released on September 30, 2013.

In promotion for the album Brown released a documentary titled The Old Documentary; a 60-minute clip that chronicles Brown's life and rhymes, filmed and directed by Nic Notion, in Detroit 2009. The footage was released in promotion for the album on August 16, 2013. On August 16, Brown released a new song off the album titled "Handstand". The song was produced by British grime producer Darq E Freaker, who previously collaborated with Brown on Freaker's own track "Blueberry (Pills & Cocaine)".

On August 26, 2013, via his Twitter feed Danny Brown announced that Old would be released on September 30, 2013. On August 26, Brown also appeared on Sway Calloway's radio show Sway in the Morning, and revealed he was never on bad terms with Fool's Gold and that his frustration and the album's delay was due to sample clearance issues. On August 28, 2013, the first music video in promotion for Old was released. The video, directed by RUFFMERCY, was for a song titled "ODB", the album's former title and was produced by Paul White.

On September 16, 2013, Brown released a song titled "Side A (Old)". Later that day, Brown released a trailer for Old, which features the aforementioned song and revealed that the album would be available for streaming via Spotify on September 30, and available for purchase in stores and online on October 8, 2013. The album was made available for pre-order via the iTunes Store on September 16, 2013, as well, with the tracks "Side A (Old)" and "Kush Coma", being released early to those who pre-ordered it. On September 23, Brown finally unveiled the album's official track list.

=== Singles ===
On July 30, 2013, English disc jockey and record producer Mark Ronson, premiered a song by Danny Brown titled "Dip", during his live set at Boiler Room. The song had previously been performed by Brown at live events, however Ronson received the studio version of the track. The song, produced by Bruiser Brigade's Skywlkr, samples Freak Nasty's 1996 single "Da' Dip". On September 19, 2013, Brown released the official music video for "Dip". On October 23, 2013, "Dip" was serviced to mainstream urban radio in the United States as the album's first official single.

On April 9, 2014, the official music video for "25 Bucks" featuring Purity Ring, was released. On April 14, 2014, Fool's Gold Records released "25 Bucks", as the album's second single. On July 18, 2014, Brown released "Smokin & Drinkin", as the album's third single.

== Critical reception ==
Professional ratings
Aggregate scores
Source	Rating
AnyDecentMusic?	8.3/10
Metacritic	83/100
Review scores
Source	Rating
AllMusic	5/5 stars
Entertainment Weekly	A−
Fact	4/5
The Irish Times	4/5 stars
NME	8/10
Pitchfork	8.7/10
Rolling Stone	3.5/5 stars
Spin	8/10
Uncut	8/10
Vice (Expert Witness)	A−

Old was met with widespread critical acclaim. At Metacritic, which assigns a normalized rating out of 100 to reviews from professional publications, the album received an average score of 83, based on 30 reviews. Aggregator AnyDecentMusic? gave Old 8.3 out of 10, based on their assessment of the critical consensus.

Aaron Matthews of Exclaim! said, "Old is a post-fame album done right. Acutely aware of expectations and potential criticism, Danny doubled down on what makes him great instead of selling out. Here's to aging gracefully." Dan Jackson of XXL said, "In a year that's seen aging rappers in both the mainstream (Jay Z, Kanye West) and underground (J-Zone, Ka) confront the concept of their own mortality with varying degrees of honesty and depth, Old might be the most impressive yet. Brown displays real bravery in his willingness to merge the sacred with the profane, the independent with the arena-ready, the old with the new. As the binaries of rap continue to collapse, Brown looks less like an outcast and more like a trailblazer. It feels like time is on his side." Brandon Soderberg of Spin said, "Old is XXX without that fun first half. It isn't traditionally enjoyable, and it isn't supposed to be. But for Danny Brown, the pill-popping, pussy-eating squawk-box, it's the most daring record he could've made."

John Twells of Fact said, "With Old, Brown has bettered XXX by putting in the same kind of hard graft that has given him the edge on his endless run of tours. It's an album that feels measured and well timed and yet avoids sounding over-polished or awkwardly stage-managed. He might be getting older, but Danny Brown is bucking the rap trend and aging gracefully, and he's putting way too many freshmen to shame in the process. Kendrick might not have shouted him out on "Control", but he damn well should have". David Jeffries of AllMusic said, "The album's title -- which flows perfectly after his 2012 single "Grown Up"—is referenced on the Charli XCX track when "Float On" finds Brown wondering how hip-hop will see his work once he's old, but with other lines like "Music in my heart, but my thoughts wouldn't listen" and "I'm tormented with the things I've seen with these eyes," he need not fret. Luckily, he does, and while Old often seems like a hip-hop kaleidoscope exploding across the speakers, it's also crafted and paced, split down the middle like a great LP with a sure start and a freeing finish. If XXX was the come-up and the "Grown Up" single was the breakthrough, this is the masterpiece".

Mike Powell of Rolling Stone said, "His third LP is less focused than 2011's XXX but has a wider range of moods: For every Friday binge ("Dip"), there's a bleak Saturday morning ("Lonely"); for every boast about anonymous sex, there's a reflection on a childhood numbed by violence ("Torture"). This is Brown at war with himself, proud of success but tired of the persona it required. The production is vivid, trippy and abrasive, bleeding the line between hip-hop and EDM – a sound as compellingly haywire as Brown is an MC." Julia LeConte of Now said, "Throughout, his rhymes hit the mark, whether he's painting a bleak picture of the Detroit streets, battling his own demons (loneliness, molly, more molly) or rapping at length about drug-dealing without glorifying it Rick Ross-style." Jesse Fairfax of HipHopDX said, "Simultaneously targeting fanatics who believe Danny Brown can do no wrong and traditionalist skeptics who show up for highlights like the Oh No produced 'Red 2 Go,' Old requires the patience and empathy one would lend to a friend suffering from a bipolar disorder."

=== Accolades ===
Old was ranked at number 17 on Rolling Stone's list of the 50 best albums of 2013. Spin positioned it at number 12 on their list of the best 50 albums of 2013. Pitchfork named the album as the fifth best album of 2013. XXL named it the ninth best album of 2013. Complex named the album the fifth best release of the 2013.

== Commercial performance ==
Old debuted at number 17 on the US Billboard 200, selling 15,000 copies in its first week of release.

== Track listing ==
Old track listing
No.	Title	Writer(s)	Producer(s)	Length
1.	"Side A (Old)"	Daniel Sewell; Paul Williams White	Paul White	2:23
2.	"The Return" (featuring Freddie Gibbs)	Sewell; Fredrick Tipton; White; Filip Nikolić; André Benjamin; Antwan Patton; Patrick Brown; Giorgio Moroder; Raymon Murray; Rico Wade; Corey Woods	White	3:10
3.	"25 Bucks" (featuring Purity Ring)	Sewell; Megan James • Corin Roddick	Roddick	3:30
4.	"Wonderbread"	Sewell; White	White	1:58
5.	"Gremlins"	Sewell; Michael Jackson	Oh No	2:05
6.	"Dope Fiend Rental" (featuring Schoolboy Q)	Sewell; Quincy Hanley; Skylar Tait; Walter Lee Morris; Al Goodman; Harry Milton Ray	Skywlkr	2:55
7.	"Torture"	Sewell; Jackson; Georgia Brown; H. De Bruyn; Gerd Frank	Oh No	3:46
8.	"Lonely"	Sewell; White; Morice Benin	White	2:19
9.	"Clean Up"	Sewell; White	White	3:01
10.	"Red 2 Go"	Sewell; Jackson; Keith Kabwe; Issac Mpofu	Oh No	3:18
11.	"Side B (Dope Song)"	Sewell; Russell Whyte	Rustie	2:36
12.	"Dubstep" (featuring Scrufizzer)	Sewell; Romani Lorenzo; Tait	Skywlkr	2:16
13.	"Dip"	Sewell; Tait; Eric Timmons; Shawn Carter; Kanye West; Mike Dean; Reverend W.A. Donaldson; Chauncey Hollis	Skywlkr	3:31
14.	"Smokin & Drinkin"	Sewell; Alain Macklovitch; Jeremy Coleman	A-Trak; JMIKE	2:53
15.	"Break It (Go)"	Sewell; Whyte	Rustie	3:12
16.	"Handstand"	Sewell; Jeremiah Nteh	Darq E Freaker	2:55
17.	"Way Up Here" (featuring Ab-Soul)	Sewell; Herbert Stevens; Whyte	Rustie	2:36
18.	"Kush Coma" (featuring ASAP Rocky and Zelooperz)	Sewell; Rakim Mayers; Walter Williams; Tait	Skywlkr	4:41
19.	"Float On" (featuring Charli XCX)	Sewell; Charlotte Aitchison; Adam Feeney; Matthew Tavares • Chester Hansen • Alexander Sowinski	Frank Dukes; BadBadNotGood	3:31
Total length:				56:36

Sample credits

- "The Return" contains an interpolation of "Return of the 'G'", written by André Benjamin, Antwan Patton, Patrick Brown, Giorgio Moroder, Raymon Murray, Rico Wade and Corey Woods.
- "Dope Fiend Rental" contains a sample of "What's Your Name", as performed by The Moments.
- "Torture" contains a sample of "Pollution", as performed by Georgia Brown and produced by Gene Van den Ostende.
- "Lonely" contains a sample of "Apocalypse", as performed by Morice Benin.
- "Clean Up" lifts from "The Raven", as performed by the Alan Parsons Project.
- "Red 2 Go" contains a sample of "Green Apple", as performed by Amanaz.
- "Dip" contains interpolations of "Da' Dip", written by Eric Timmons; and "Niggas in Paris", written by Shawn Carter, Kanye West, Mike Dean, Reverend W.A. Donaldson and Chauncey Hollis.

== Personnel ==
Credits for Old adapted from AllMusic.

- Ab-Soul – featured artist
- A$AP Rocky – featured artist
- A-Trak – executive producer, producer, scratching
- BadBadNotGood – producer
- Danny Brown – primary artist
- Nick Catchdubs – executive producer
- Charli XCX – featured artist
- Sam Chirnside – design, layout
- Leila D'Amato – cover painting
- Darq E. Freaker – producer
- DJ Romes – mixing
- Frank Dukes – mixing, producer
- Freddie Gibbs – featured artist
- Nick Hook – engineer
- J-MIKE – producer
- Leon Kelly – engineer
- Filip Nikolic – instrumentation, programming
- Oh No – mixing, producer
- Purity Ring – featured artist
- Corin Roddick – producer
- Rustie – engineer, mixing, producer
- Tatsuya Sato – mastering
- ScHoolboy Q – featured artist
- Scrufizzer – featured artist
- Skywlkr – producer
- Scott Stallone – mixing
- Matt Tavares – engineer, mixing
- Josh Wehle – collage, photography
- Paul White – engineer, producer

== Charts ==
Chart performance for Old
Chart (2013)	Peak position
Australian Albums (ARIA)	61
UK R&B Albums (OCC)	17
US Billboard 200	18
US Top R&B/Hip-Hop Albums (Billboard)	4
