= The Ascent (Wiley album) =

Studio album by Wiley
- Released: 1 April 2013
- Recorded: 2012–2013
- Genre: Hip-hop; dance; grime
- Length: 46:04 (standard edition); 59:12 (deluxe edition)
- Label: Warner Music Group
- Producer: Wiley, Rymez, Wize, Thomas Mellor, Sillkey, Kid D, Xaphoon Jones

Wiley chronology
Evolve or Be Extinct (2012)	The Ascent (2013)	Snakes & Ladders (2014)

Singles from The Ascent
- 1. "Heatwave" Released: 27 July 2012; 2. "Can You Hear Me? (Ayayaya)" Released: 28 October 2012; 3. "Reload" Released: 24 February 2013; 4. "Lights On" Released: 7 June 2013

The Ascent is the ninth studio album by English rapper and producer Wiley. The album was released on 1 April 2013, by Warner Music Group and Boy Better Know, after being delayed twice. The Ascent succeeds Evolve or Be Extinct which was released in January 2012. The album features a variety of experimental genres, varying from dance pop to grime.

The lead single "Heatwave", featuring Ms D, peaking at number 1 on the UK Singles Chart, becoming Wiley's first number 1 as a solo artist. This was followed by "Can You Hear Me? (Ayayaya)" featuring Skepta, JME and Ms D, "Reload" featuring Chip and Ms D, all of which peaked in the top 10.

== Critical reception ==
Professional ratings
Aggregate scores
Source	Rating
Metacritic	61/100
Review scores
Source	Rating
Allmusic	3/5 stars
Clash	4/10
Drowned in Sound	4/10
The Guardian	3/5 stars
Hot Press	3.5/5
musicOMH	3.5/5 stars
NME	5/10
Pitchfork Media	6.2/10
The Skinny	2/5 stars
Time Out London	3/5 stars

The album received positive to mixed reviews from music critics and entered the UK Albums Chart at number 26 which became his highest-charting solo studio album until Godfather (2017) reached the top 10, yet is his first top 40 album entry. The album has spawned four top ten hits in the UK Singles Chart including the number one single "Heatwave" which also charted in Australia.

== Background ==
The name of the album was first confirmed by Wiley on 27 September 2012, via his official Twitter account. Wiley also confirmed that his friend Meryl Fernandes, who portrayed Afia Masood in British soap opera EastEnders named his album. The album's track list was later revealed on 11 October 2012, detailing sixteen tracks. However, in January 2013, the track list was revised. "Walking Through Fire", "Stay Here", "Common Ground" (featuring Ryan Keen), and "Drink My Pain Away" (featuring Stacy Barthe) were removed from the album; while "Ninja" was demoted to the deluxe edition, and "So Alive", "Tomorrow" and "Humble Pie" were added to the standard edition, while "Rubicon" and "Broken Thoughts" were added to the deluxe edition. The album was originally due to be released on 4 February 2013, but was later delayed until 11 March 2013, in order for a third single to be released prior to the album. The album was once again delayed until 1 April 2013, to allow for final edits to be made on the album. "Ninja" was previously released as an official free download. Wiley collaborated with an extensive number of artists for the album, with featured guest appearances including Far East Movement, Kano, Skepta, JME, Ghetts, Griminal, Manga, Frisco, Big Shizz, Double S, Chip, Wrigz, J2K, Ice Kid and Megaman, Tulisa, Angel and Emeli Sandé.

== Singles ==
"Heatwave", featuring Ms D, was released as the album's lead single, debuting at number 1 on the UK Singles Chart on 5 August 2012, selling over 114,000 copies in its first week, becoming Wiley's first ever solo number one. "Can You Hear Me? (Ayayaya)", featuring Skepta, JME & Ms D, was released as the album's second single on 28 October 2012. It peaked at number 3 on the UK Singles Chart, selling 75,000 copies. "Reload", featuring Chip & Ms D, was released as the album's third single on 24 February 2013. It entered the top ten of the UK Singles Chart on the week ending 3 March 2013 at number 9. "Lights On", featuring Angel and Tinchy Stryder, was released as the album's fourth single on 7 June 2013. It also entered the UK Singles Chart at number 9.

== Track listing ==
The Ascent — Standard edition
No.	Title	Writer(s)	Producer(s)	Length
1.	"Ascent Intro"	Richard Cowie	Alex Oriet; Saltwives	3:35
2.	"First Class" (featuring Kano and Lethal Bizzle)	Cowie; Noah Beresin; Kane Robinson; Maxwell Ansah	Xaphoon Jones	4:01
3.	"Skillzone" (featuring Ghetts, Griminal, Manga, Frisco, Double S, Scratchy and Big Shizz)	Cowie; Justin Clarke Samuel; Joshua Ramsey; Matthew Reid; Bashir Bazanye; Peter McNulty; Deshane Cornwall; Jordan Birch; Ryan Williams	Wize	3:47
4.	"Hands in the Air" (featuring Tulisa and Ice Kid)	Cowie; Rodney Hwingwiri; Ariowa Irosogie; Kian Joshua Roberts	Rymez	3:25
5.	"Reload" (featuring Ms D and Chip)	Cowie; Dayo Olatunji; Michael Orabiyi; Talay Riley	Mike "Scribz" Riley; The Skeptiks (add.)	3:13
6.	"Chainsaw" (featuring Wrigz, J2K and Kivanc)	Cowie; Jason Black; Daniel Wrigley; Thomas Mellor; Kivanc Sezen	Thomas Mellor	3:59
7.	"Heatwave" (featuring Ms D)	Cowie; Hwingwiri; Irosogie	Rymez	3:14
8.	"So Alive" (featuring Far East Movement)	Cowie; Frederick Taylor; John Gant; Syleena Johnson	Toxic	2:54
9.	"Lights On" (featuring Angel and Tinchy Stryder)	Cowie; Sirach "Angel" Charles; Kassa Alexander; Kwasi Danquah	Charles; Wez Clarke (add.)	3:25
10.	"Can You Hear Me? (Ayayaya)" (featuring Skepta, JME and Ms D)	Cowie; Hwingwiri; Joseph Adenuga; Jamie Adenuga; Olatunji; Largie	Rymez; Sillkey; Anthony "Krunchie" Bamgboye	3:52
11.	"Tomorrow" (featuring Megaman and Styalz Fuego)	Cowie; Dwayne Vincent; Kaelyn Bahr	Styalz Fuego	3:40
12.	"My Heart" (featuring Emeli Sandé and French Montana)	Cowie; Adele Sandé; Black	Chris Loco	2:59
13.	"Humble Pie"	Cowie; Dean Robertson	Kid D	3:45
Total length:				46:04

The Ascent — Deluxe edition bonus tracks
No.	Title	Writer(s)	Producer(s)	Length
14.	"Rubicon"	Cowie; Nathan Gerald	Preditah	4:12
15.	"Ninja"	Cowie	Cowie	3:15
16.	"Broken Thoughts"	Cowie	Kid D	4:05
17.	"Heatwave" (Music video)			3:21
18.	"Can You Hear Me?" (Music video)			3:53
19.	"Reload" (Music video)			3:17
20.	"The Story So Far" (Documentary)			9:55
Total length:				59:12

== Release history ==
Region	Date	Format	Label	Catalogue
United Kingdom	1 April 2013	CD, digital download	Warner Music Group	ASC003
Ireland	1 April 2013	CD, digital download	Warner Music Group	ASC003
