= Kid D =

English grime and rap musician (born 1989)

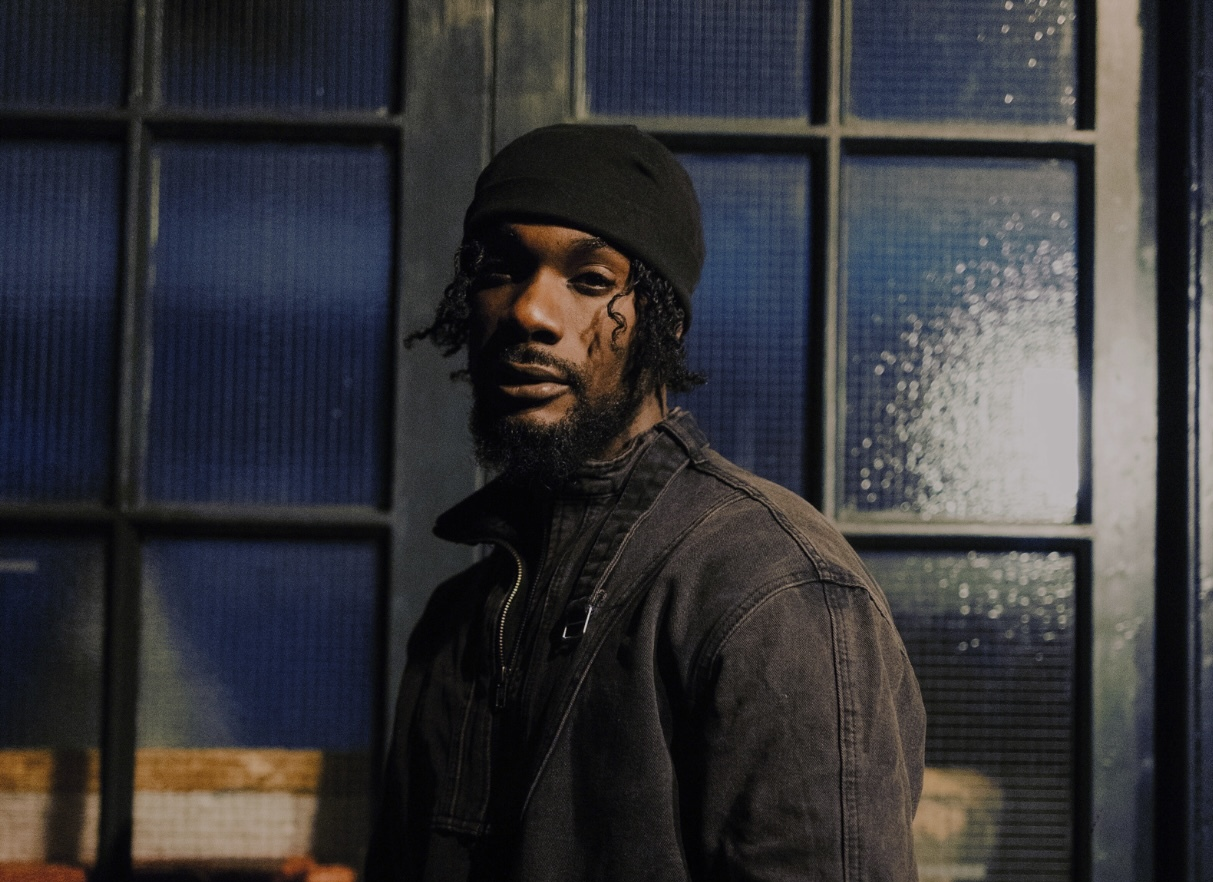

Background information
- Born: Dean Robertson; May 28, 1989 (age 37); Dulwich, London, England
- Origin: Forest Hill, London, England
- Genres: Grime; R&G; trap
- Occupations: Record producer; MC; DJ
- Years active: 2005–present
- Labels: 2 Easy Records; Sweet Beetz; Widow Records; Launchpad Records; No Hats No Hoods; Four40 Records; AP Life

Dean Robertson (Ga: Nii Kutey OkaiKoi; born 28 May 1989), better known by his stage name Kid D, is a Ghanaian-British grime music producer, rapper/MC and DJ from Forest Hill, Lewisham, London, recognised among the pioneers of the rhythm & grime style of music.

Robertson is credited as a producer on various charting albums including Wiley's The Ascent (2013), Snakes & Ladders (2014) and Godfather (2017), Ghetts' Ghetto Gospel: The New Testament (2018), 67's The Glorious Twelfth (2017) and Devlin's The Outcast (2019). He has worked frequently with Wiley and Ghetts, and other notable collaborators have included Skepta and Hardy Caprio.

== Musical style ==
Robertson is associated with the rhythm & grime style due to the uses and influences of rhythm and blues songs in his music, including sampling singers such as Aaliyah and SWV in his beats. He has credited Timbaland and Dr. Dre as inspirations.

Mixmag columnist Tomas Fraser has described Robertson's music as "striking a balance between light and dark, rough and smooth", noting his use of chiptune sounds and 808 drums. TRENCH editor James Keith heard new wave influences in the single "Serious Choices". Felicity Martin has described Robertson in DJ Mag as being "known for his epic, crystalline melodies" and his 2018 album Authentic Expressions as consisting of "cinematic, trap-leaning beats".

== Career ==
=== 2005–2012: Early career and breakthrough ===
Robertson has claimed that one of his earliest musical memories is playing a drum that his father brought back from a visit to Ghana at the age of five, prompting him to learn the instrument. In his early teens, he performed as an MC, appearing briefly on pirate radio with his older brother as the DJ before turning his hand to record production. Early instrumental releases included the EP First Realm (2006), released on white label vinyl via J-Sweet's label Sweet Beetz, and its sequel, Second Realm (2007). Robertson produced the single "Gudthing" for novelty grime artist Mr. Wong, taken from his 2007 album I Bet It Will Stay In Ur Car 4 A Year, which was supported by Channel U and resulted in increased attention in his instrumentals. He released an eleven-track instrumental project titled Enter the Realm in November 2008.

He was credited with producing the Maxsta song "Don't Wanna See" (featuring Voltage) from his May 2010 mixtape Maxtape and the Ghetts songs "Back from the Mountain" and "Job for You" (featuring Youngsta and Brutal) from his July 2010 mixtape The Calm Before the Storm, which did not enter the main UK albums chart but peaked at number 28 on the UK Independent Albums Chart, number 32 on the UK Hip Hop and R&B Albums Chart and number 93 on the UK Album Downloads Chart.

=== 2012–2014: Credits on charting Wiley albums ===
In 2012, Robertson released the This Is 2 Easy EP via Launchpad Records, for which Wiley was an A&R. The project included the Ghetts collaboration "Live for Today". He subsequently produced various songs for Wiley under the labels Warner Music and Big Dada, including the closing song "Humble Pie" and bonus track "Broken Thoughts" on his UK number 26 charting album The Ascent (2013) and the December 2013 single "Born in the Cold", which later appeared as a bonus track on his UK number 69 charting album Snakes & Ladders (2014).

=== 2014–2020: Founding of 2 Easy Records, further collaborations, and Authentic Expressions ===
In November 2014, Robertson appeared on DJ Cameo's BBC Radio 1Xtra show with a guest DJ mix of all original rhythm & grime productions. He released multiple EPs in 2015, including the R&G God EP and the East Asian-inspired Shaolin Shoggle, which has been described as sinogrime. He established the label 2 Easy Records around the same time, initially for his self-released music. He also produced Hardy Caprio's 2015 song "SoundBwoy 2". In June 2016, Robertson released the #GrimeGutsAndGlory EP with grime MC NoLay, which he produced in its entirety. The project included the singles "Pressure", "Gotta Love It" and "Have You Forgotten".

In November 2016, Robertson was credited as the producer of the Wiley single "U Were Always, Pt. 2", featuring Skepta and Belly, which peaked at number 38 on the UK Independent Singles Chart. The song served as the third single from Wiley's eleventh album Godfather (2017), which later peaked at number nine on the UK Albums Chart. Also in November 2016, he debuted on community radio station Pyro Radio with a takeover show and released the First Kid EP. In July 2017, he produced the song "Money Spree" for drill group 67, taken from their UK number 71 charting mixtape The Glorious Twelfth, and in August of the same year, he released the Pay Homage EP via UK bass label Four40 Records.

In July 2018, Robertson released Authentic Expressions, a twelve-track album interspersing instrumental songs with vocal features from Ghetts, Kyze and Max Rock among others. It was rated 8.5 out of 10 by DJ Mag and 9 out of 10 by Mixmag. He co-produced the Ghetts songs "Caution" and "Window Pain" on the charting album Ghetto Gospel: The New Testament, which was released in September 2018 and peaked at number 30 in the UK. He also produced Devlin's March 2019 single "Limelight", which appeared on his UK number 94 charting album The Outcast. In July 2019, he hosted a takeover show on Rinse FM, spotlighting his original productions. In August of the same year, he released the six-track EP Calculated via 2 Easy Records, which featured Ghetts on the opening song "Calculated Intro".

=== 2020–present: Transition into rapper-producer and debut vocal album Substance ===
In February 2020, Robertson announced that he had been writing lyrics and had recorded a fully self-produced debut vocal EP titled Substance for release later in the year, marking the news with the release of his first vocal single, "Take Me Away (Substance Intro)". Three more singles followed – "Bring It On", "Different Class" featuring 23 Remz, and "Serious Choices" featuring Novelist – and it was announced that the project had become a full-length album. Substance was released in May 2021, at sixteen tracks in total, and featured further contributions from Ghetts, Devlin and Yung Saber among others. "My Fragrance" was later promoted as the album's fifth and final single, with a video shared via Link Up TV in July 2021.

Robertson has also continued to release instrumental grime music into the 2020s, including the December 2020 EP Spiritual Art via his own label 2 Easy and the May 2021 EP Timing via Bok Bok's AP Life label, which was also released on vinyl. He has also signed other artists to 2 Easy Records, including Y.K and Max Rock.

== Legacy ==
In 2014, Fact writer Tom Lea named Robertson's song "Beautiful" among the "25 greatest r'n'g tracks" of all time, and in 2015, DJ Mag described him as the rhythm and grime style's "main proprietor". Writing for DJ Mag in 2025, Robert Kazandjian credited Robertson as a "revolutionary" grime producer, claiming he was among those to lay the "groundwork" for a new generation of "mellow grime" producers like KwolleM, Ryder and Wize.

Other artists have cited Robertson as a key influence on their sound, including Hyperdub signee Endgame, who has described him as "massively influential", and Big Dada and Mute Records signee Visionist, who described him as the "king of RnG" and "his sampling of vocals" as "a big influence on my own work".

== Selected discography ==
=== Albums ===
- Authentic Expressions (2018)
- Substance (2021)

=== Extended plays ===
- First Realm (Sweet Beetz, 2006)
- Second Realm (Widow Records, 2007)
- Enter the Realm (self-released, 2008)
- This Is 2 Easy (Launchpad Records, 2012)
- R&G God (self-released, 2015)
- Shaolin Shoggle (self-released, 2015)
- #GrimeGutsAndGlory (with NoLay) (2016)
- First Kid (2 Easy Records, 2016)
- Calculated (2 Easy Records, 2019)
- Spiritual Art (2 Easy Records, 2020)
- Timing (AP Life, 2021)

=== Singles ===
- "Take Me Away (Substance Intro)" (2 Easy Records, 2020)
- "Bring It On" (2 Easy Records, 2020)
- "Different Class" (featuring 23 Remz) (2 Easy Records, 2020)
- "Serious Choices" (featuring Novelist) (2 Easy Records, 2020)
- "My Fragrance" (2 Easy Records, 2021)

=== Production credits ===
Year	Artist	Song	Album	Co-producer(s)
2006	Mr. Wong	"Gudthing"	I Bet It Will Stay In Ur Car 4 A Year	
2010	Maxsta	"Don't Wanna See" (featuring Voltage)	Maxtape	
2010	Ghetts	"Back from the Mountain"	The Calm Before the Storm	
2010	Ghetts	"Job for You" (featuring Brutal and Youngsta)	The Calm Before the Storm	
2012	Wiley	"Humble Pie"	The Ascent	
2012	Wiley	"Broken Thoughts"	The Ascent	
2013	Wiley	"Born in the Cold" (featuring Andreena Mill)	Snakes & Ladders	
2014	Hollowman Jendor	"The Terrorist"	Grandmaster 2: Return of the Prodigal Son	
2014	Hollowman Jendor	"Riding"	Grandmaster 2: Return of the Prodigal Son	
2015	Hardy Caprio	"SoundBwoy 2"	Hardy Season	
2017	Wiley	"U Were Always, Pt. 2" (featuring Skepta and Belly)	Godfather	
2017	67	"Money Spree"	The Glorious Twelfth	
2018	Ghetts	"Caution"	Ghetto Gospel: The New Testament	Confect & Naldo
2018	Ghetts	"Window Pain"	Ghetto Gospel: The New Testament	Chris Penny
2019	Devlin	"Limelight"	The Outcast	
