= On a Level =

Single by Wiley

from the album Snakes & Ladders
- Released: 25 September 2014 (UK)
- Genre: Grime
- Length: 3:02 (single version)
- Label: Big Dada
- Songwriter(s): Richard Cowie
- Producer(s): Skepta

Wiley singles chronology
"F**k It" (2013)	"On a Level" (2014)	"Ah Yeah, So What!" (2014)

"On a Level" is a single from English grime artist Wiley, produced by longtime collaborator Skepta. It is the first official single released from Wiley's tenth studio album Snakes & Ladders.

The song intentionally recalls the eskibeat style of the material on Wiley's early white label releases and debut album Treddin' on Thin Ice, it was made after Skepta suggested Wiley return to his "original element".

== Music video ==
The music video was directed by Skepta and premiered on the website of Complex on 24 September 2014. The video was set in an English country mansion and begins with a clip of eskibeat instrumental The Morgue which was released by Wiley on white label in 2003. It features cameos from various prominent UK MCs including Boy Better Know, Giggs, Stormzy and Novelist all dressed in black.

== Track listings ==
Digital download

1. "On a Level" – 3:02

== Credits and personnel ==
- Lead vocals – Wiley
- Producer – Skepta
- Lyrics – Richard Cowie
- Label: Big Dada

== Release history ==
Country	Date	Format	Label
United Kingdom	25 September 2014	Digital download	Big Dada
