= What Lovers Do =

Single by Maroon 5 featuring SZA

from the album Red Pill Blues
- Released: August 30, 2017
- Recorded: 2017
- Studio: Los Angeles (Conway Recording, Westlake Recording); Tarzana (Chumba Meadows); Virginia Beach (Mixstar Studios)
- Genre: Dance-pop
- Length: 3:16
- Label: 222; Interscope
- Songwriters: Adam Levine; Benjamin Diehl; Brittany Talia Hazzard; Elina Stridh; Jason Evigan; Oladayo Olatunji; Solána Imani Rowe; Victor Rådström
- Producers: Sam Farrar; Ben Billions; Jason Evigan; Noah Passovoy

Maroon 5 singles chronology
"Cold" (2017)	"What Lovers Do" (2017)	"Wait" (2018)

SZA singles chronology
"Love Galore" (2017)	"What Lovers Do" (2017)	"Homemade Dynamite (Remix)" (2017)

Music video
- "What Lovers Do" on YouTube

"What Lovers Do" is a song by American band Maroon 5 featuring American singer-songwriter SZA. It was released on August 30, 2017, through 222 and Interscope Records, as the third single from the band's sixth studio album Red Pill Blues (2017). The song contains an interpolation of the 2016 song "Sexual" by Neiked featuring Dyo, therefore Victor Rådström, Dyo and Elina Stridh are credited as songwriters. The song received positive reviews, particularly for its catchy, funky sound and the chemistry between the two artists.

== Background and release ==
After extensive touring in support of their fifth studio album V (2014), Maroon 5 began the writing and recording sessions for their sixth studio album. On October 11, 2016, the band released the tropical house single "Don't Wanna Know", featuring American rapper Kendrick Lamar. Another single, entitled "Cold", featuring American rapper Future, was released on February 14, 2017. Both songs later appeared in the deluxe and Japanese editions of Red Pill Blues. The band later announced with the single's release date on August 30.

== Composition ==
"What Lovers Do" runs for approximately three minutes and 16 seconds. It was written by Adam Levine, Starrah, Jason Evigan and Solána Imani Rowe and was produced by Evigan, Ben Billions, Sam Farrar and Noah Passovoy. Victor Radstrom, Dyo, and Elina Stridh are also credited songwriters on the record, as songwriters of "Sexual" by Neiked.

The song is performed in the key of B♭ major with a tempo of 110 beats per minute. The song follows a chord progression of E♭5–Gm–F–B♭–E♭, and the vocals in the song span from F_{3} to D_{5} in common time.

== Commercial performance ==
=== North America and Oceania ===
In the United States, "What Lovers Do" reached number nine on the Billboard Hot 100, becoming Maroon 5's 13th and SZA's first top 10. By September 2017, it had sold 116,000 copies in the United States according to Nielsen SoundScan; later, it would reach double platinum status as certified by the RIAA. The track reached number seven on the ARIA Singles Chart, becoming the band's tenth single in Australia to reach the top 10.

=== Europe and elsewhere ===
In Europe, the song broke records and reached the top ten in several national musical markets, becoming SZA's first international hit, including Belgium, Italy, Switzerland, Hungary, Norway, Slovenia, Portugal, Slovakia and the Netherlands, top twenty in France, Germany, Austria, Denmark and Sweden and top forty in Spain and Poland.

Elsewhere, "What Lovers Do" peaked at top ten in Asian and Latin-American countries, such as Malaysia, Philippines, Honduras, El Salvador and Lebanon, top twenty in Argentina, Panama, Paraguay, Uruguay, Bolivia and Costa Rica and top thirty in Japan, Ecuador and Colombia.

== Music video ==
The music video for "What Lovers Do" was released on Vevo, on September 28, 2017, and was directed by Joseph Kahn. The video follows a young Adam Levine and SZA chasing each other through a meadow. Now, as adults, they chase each other through the Arctic, a running field, the ocean, and underwater. Later in Las Vegas, Levine plays with SZA in a poker game until he loses to her and grabs SZA, transforming into a 50-foot version of himself. As SZA disappears on Levine's hand and turns into a doll, he attacks the city until the police, military, and Boy Scout troopers eliminate him. At the end, Levine is in a hospital, injured with SZA as his nurse.

=== Lyric video ===
A lyric video was released on September 15, 2017. This video using as found footage, which features a red and white lollipop when it melts into slime.

== Live performances ==
Maroon 5 performed "What Lovers Do" for the first time of the Rock in Rio concert at Barra Olympic Park in Rio de Janeiro on September 16, 2017. On September 28, they performed the song at the Shoreline Amphitheatre in Mountain View, CA. The band promoted "What Lovers Do" live during their appearances on The Tonight Show Starring Jimmy Fallon (with SZA), The Today Show, The Ellen DeGeneres Show, The Voice and Jimmy Kimmel Live!, respectively.

== Track listing ==
Digital download

1. "What Lovers Do" (featuring SZA) – 3:16

Digital download – Slushii Remix

1. "What Lovers Do" (Slushii Remix) – 4:14

Digital download – A-Trak Remix

1. "What Lovers Do" (A-Trak Remix) – 3:37

== Credits and personnel ==
Credits adapted from Red Pill Blues album liner notes.

Recording locations

- Recorded in Los Angeles, California at Conway Recording Studios and Westlake Recording Studios, and Chumba Meadows in Tarzana, California
- Mixed and mastered in Virginia Beach at Mixstar Studios

Maroon5

- Adam Levine – lead vocals, songwriting, executive production
- Jesse Carmichael – guitar
- Mickey Madden – bass
- James Valentine – guitar
- Matt Flynn – drums, percussion
- PJ Morton – keyboards
- Sam Farrar – bass, additional percussion, digital editing, additional producer, additional vocals

Additional personnel

- SZA – featured vocals
- Noah "Mailbox" Passovoy – keyboards, digital editing, additional percussion, engineer, backing vocals, additional producer, vocal producer
- Starrah – additional vocals, songwriting
- Ammo – additional vocals
- John Armstrong – assistant engineer
- Benjamin "Ben Billions" Diehl – writer, co-producer, keyboards, programming
- Eric Eylands – assistant engineer
- Jason Evigan – writer, producer, vocal producer, programming
- Serban Ghenea – mixing
- John Hanes – mixing engineer
- Gian Stone – engineer, vocal producer, programming

== Charts ==
=== Weekly charts ===
Weekly chart performance for "What Lovers Do"
Chart (2017–2018)	Peak position
Argentina (Monitor Latino)	12
Australia (ARIA)	7
Austria (Ö3 Austria Top 40)	11
Belgium (Ultratop 50 Flanders)	8
Belgium (Ultratop 50 Wallonia)	3
Bolivia (Monitor Latino)	19
Brazil (Top 100 Brasil)	64
Canada Hot 100 (Billboard)	6
Canada AC (Billboard)	1
Canada CHR/Top 40 (Billboard)	4
Canada Hot AC (Billboard)	3
CIS Airplay (TopHit)	23
Colombia (National-Report)	28
Costa Rica (Monitor Latino)	20
Croatia International Airplay (Top lista)	3
CIS Airplay (TopHit)	34
Czech Republic Airplay (ČNS IFPI)	36
Czech Republic Singles Digital (ČNS IFPI)	7
Denmark (Tracklisten)	12
Ecuador (National-Report)	28
El Salvador (Monitor Latino)	10
Euro Digital Song Sales (Billboard)	7
France (SNEP)	17
Germany (GfK)	17
Honduras (Monitor Latino)	8
Hungary (Rádiós Top 40)	1
Hungary (Dance Top 40)	36
Hungary (Single Top 40)	10
Hungary (Stream Top 40)	6
Ireland (IRMA)	7
Israel International Airplay (Media Forest)	6
Italy (FIMI)	5
Italian Airplay (EarOne)	7
Japan Hot 100 (Billboard)	27
Latvia (DigiTop100)	11
Lebanon Airplay (Lebanese Top 20)	9
Malaysia (RIM)	5
Mexico Airplay (Billboard)	5
Netherlands (Dutch Top 40)	9
Netherlands (Mega Top 50)	9
Netherlands (Single Top 100)	10
New Zealand (Recorded Music NZ)	6
Norway (VG-lista)	10
Panama (Monitor Latino)	16
Paraguay (Monitor Latino)	13
Philippines (Philippine Hot 100)	10
Poland Airplay (ZPAV)	32
Portugal (AFP)	7
Russia Airplay (TopHit)	65
Scottish Singles Sales (Official Charts)	7
Slovakia Airplay (ČNS IFPI)	26
Slovakia Singles Digital (ČNS IFPI)	6
Slovenia (SloTop50)	10
South Korea (Gaon)	66
Spain (Promusicae)	38
Sweden (Sverigetopplistan)	12
Switzerland (Schweizer Hitparade)	9
UK Singles (Official Charts)	12
Uruguay (Monitor Latino)	15
US Billboard Hot 100	9
US Adult Contemporary (Billboard)	8
US Adult Pop Airplay (Billboard)	3
US Dance Club Songs (Billboard)	43
US Pop Airplay (Billboard)	3
US Radio Songs (Billboard)	5
US Rhythmic Airplay (Billboard)	22
Venezuela Anglo (Record Report)	1

=== Year-end charts ===
2017 year-end chart performance for "What Lovers Do"
Chart (2017)	Position
Australia (ARIA)	70
Belgium (Ultratop Flanders)	97
Brazil (Pro-Música Brasil)	156
Canada (Canadian Hot 100)	79
Croatia (HRT Top 40)	86
France (SNEP)	173
Germany (Official German Charts)	88
Hungary (Rádiós Top 40)	78
Hungary (Single Top 40)	55
Hungary (Stream Top 40)	29
Italy (FIMI)	84
Netherlands (Dutch Top 40)	44
Netherlands (Single Top 100)	93
Portugal (AFP)	62
Sweden (Sverigetopplistan)	81
Switzerland (Schweizer Hitparade)	95
US Billboard Hot 100	97
US Adult Top 40 (Billboard)	36
US Mainstream Top 40 (Billboard)	45
US Radio Songs (Billboard)	61

2018 year-end chart performance for "What Lovers Do"
Chart (2018)	Position
Argentina (Monitor Latino)	39
Australia (ARIA)	73
Belgium (Ultratop Flanders)	57
Canada (Canadian Hot 100)	56
France (SNEP)	169
Iceland (Plötutíóindi)	47
Hungary (Rádiós Top 40)	21
Hungary (Stream Top 40)	91
Portugal (AFP)	110
US Billboard Hot 100	89
US Adult Contemporary (Billboard)	16
US Adult Top 40 (Billboard)	21
US Mainstream Top 40 (Billboard)	42
US Radio Songs (Billboard)	44

== Certifications ==
Certifications and sales for "What Lovers Do"
Region	Certification	Certified units/sales
Australia (ARIA)	7× Platinum	490,000^{‡}
Belgium (BRMA)	Platinum	20,000^{‡}
Brazil (Pro-Música Brasil)	2× Diamond	500,000^{‡}
Canada (Music Canada)	4× Platinum	320,000^{‡}
Denmark (IFPI Danmark)	Platinum	90,000^{‡}
France (SNEP)	Platinum	133,333^{‡}
Germany (BVMI)	Platinum	400,000^{‡}
Italy (FIMI)	3× Platinum	150,000^{‡}
New Zealand (RMNZ)	5× Platinum	150,000^{‡}
Poland (ZPAV)	2× Platinum	100,000^{‡}
Portugal (AFP)	2× Platinum	20,000^{‡}
Spain (Promusicae)	Platinum	40,000^{‡}
Sweden (GLF)	3× Platinum	24,000,000^{†}
United Kingdom (BPI)	Platinum	600,000^{‡}
United States (RIAA)	2× Platinum	2,000,000^{‡}
^{‡} Sales+streaming figures based on certification alone.^{†} Streaming-only figures based on certification alone.

== Release history ==
Release dates for "What Lovers Do"
Region	Date	Format(s)	Version	Label(s)	Ref.
Various	August 30, 2017	Digital download; streaming	Original	222; Interscope	
United States	September 5, 2017	Contemporary hit radio	Original	222; Interscope	
United States	September 5, 2017	Hot adult contemporary radio	Original	222; Interscope	
United States	September 5, 2017	Rhythmic contemporary radio	Original	222; Interscope	
Italy	September 15, 2017	Contemporary hit radio	Original	Universal	
United Kingdom	September 15, 2017	Contemporary hit radio	Original	Polydor	
Various	September 15, 2017	Digital download	Slushii Remix	222; Interscope	
Various	November 2, 2017	Digital download	A-Trak Remix	222; Interscope	
