= Heatwave (Wiley song) =

2012 single by Wiley

Single by Wiley featuring Ms D

from the album The Ascent
- Released: 27 July 2012
- Length: 3:14
- Label: Warner Music/One More Tune
- Songwriters: Richard Cowie; Dayo Olatunji
- Producer: Rymez

Wiley singles chronology
"Boom Blast" (2012)	"Heatwave" (2012)	"Can You Hear Me? (Ayayaya)" (2012)

Ms D singles chronology
"Oopsy Daisy" (2009)	"Heatwave" (2012)	"Can You Hear Me? (Ayayaya)" (2012)

"Heatwave" is a single from British grime artist Wiley, featuring vocals from Ms D – known for singing on the Chipmunk song "Oopsy Daisy". It was released as the lead single from his ninth studio album The Ascent on 27 July 2012 for digital download in the United Kingdom. It was written by Wiley, Dayo Olatunji and produced by Rymez, who is unofficially credited as a featured artist. "Heatwave" received major radio airplay, while managing to enter on BBC Radio 1's A-list. The song debuted at number 1 on the UK Singles Chart on 5 August 2012, selling over 114,000 copies, while becoming Wiley's first ever solo number 1.

== Music video ==
A music video to accompany the release of "Heatwave" was first released onto YouTube on 29 June 2012 at a total length of three minutes and twenty-one seconds.

== Critical reception ==
Lewis Corner of Digital Spy gave the song a neutral review, calling it "a suitably cool summer jam, but if Wiley really wants to make an impact like his peers, he's going to have to dial the temperature up just a little bit higher yet.."

== Chart performance ==
"Heatwave" was number 1 on the Wednesday and Friday UK midweek chart. As predicted, the song entered the UK Singles Chart on 5 August 2012 at number 1, spending two weeks there (holding off "We'll Be Coming Back" by Calvin Harris and Example). "Heatwave" sold over 114,000 copies in its first week of release and became Wiley's first ever solo number 1 single. In the second week of release, Wiley remained at number 1, selling another 66,000. The song has sold 416,000 copies in the UK as of December 2012, and was the 38th best-selling single of 2012.

== Track listings ==
Digital download
No.	Title	Length
1.	"Heatwave" (featuring Ms D)	3:14
2.	"Heatwave" (featuring Ms D) (DEVolution Radio Edit)	3:01
3.	"Heatwave" (featuring Ms D) (Kat Krazy Radio Edit)	3:26
4.	"Heatwave" (featuring Ms D) (Kat Krazy Extended Mix)	4:29
5.	"Heatwave" (featuring Ms D) (DEVolution Extended Mix)	5:06

Promotional CD single
No.	Title	Length
1.	"Heatwave" (featuring Ms D) (Radio Edit)	3:16
2.	"Heatwave" (featuring Ms D) (Instrumental Mix)	3:15

== Credits and personnel ==
- Vocals – Wiley and Ms D
- Producer – Rymez
- Lyrics – Richard Cowie
- Label: Warner Music Group

== Charts ==
=== Weekly charts ===
Chart (2012)	Peak position
Australia (ARIA)	31
Belgium (Ultratip Flanders)	15
Belgium Dance (Ultratop Flanders)	41
Belgium Urban (Ultratop Flanders)	36
Czech Republic Airplay (ČNS IFPI)	8
Ireland (IRMA)	8
Scottish Singles Sales (Official Charts)	1
Slovakia Airplay (ČNS IFPI)	83
UK Dance (Official Charts)	1
UK Singles (Official Charts)	1

=== Year-end charts ===
Chart (2012)	Position
UK Singles (Official Charts Company)	38

== Certifications ==
Region	Certification	Certified units/sales
United Kingdom (BPI)	Platinum	600,000^{‡}
^{‡} Sales+streaming figures based on certification alone.

== Release history ==
Country	Date	Format	Label
United Kingdom	27 July 2012	Digital download	Warner Music
