= Dyo (singer) =

- Born: London, England
- Genres: Pop, R&B, dance
- Occupations: Singer, songwriter

Dayo Olatunji, known professionally as Dyo (formerly Ms D), is an English singer-songwriter.

== Early life ==
Dyo grew up in East Ham, East London. Her mother was born in the United Kingdom, and her father was born in Lagos, Nigeria.

Having started to sing at the age of 4, at age 10 she started to take part in talent shows, competitions and performing in school assemblies.

== Career ==
=== 2009–2016: Ms D ===
Under her previous stage name 'Ms D', she was credited as the featured artist and co-writer for all three of rapper Wiley's hit singles from his 2013 album The Ascent including UK Chart #1 Single "Heatwave". In December 2012, she was featured on "Dependency", the debut single by English singer Charlie Brown. She is also known for her vocals on rapper Chipmunk's 2009 UK Chart #1 single "Oopsy Daisy". Ms D was credited as a songwriter and backing vocalist for Iggy Azalea's 2013 single "Bounce".

=== 2016–present: Dyo ===
In June 2016, unveiling her new stage name 'Dyo', she was credited as the featured vocalist and co-writer of pop song "Sexual" by Swedish producer NEIKED. On 15 September 2016, Dyo signed a publishing deal with Warner/Chappell Music. On 19 April 2017, Dyo was nominated for Best Contemporary Song at the 62nd Ivor Novello Awards for her songwriting work on "Sexual". On 25 August 2017, Fifth Harmony released their third studio album which features a song entitled "Lonely Night" co-written by Dyo. In 2018, she collaborated with Nigeria's Adekunle Gold on his About 30 album on a track titled Down With You and arguably the best track on the album which led to her increased popularity in her home country, Nigeria. In June 2018, Luis Fonsi released his new single 'Calypso' ft. Stefflon Don, a song on which Dyo is credited as a co-writer. On 1 October 2018, Dyo received a BMI award for her songwriting contribution on the Maroon 5 hit single 'What Lovers Do'.

In 2019, Dyo started releasing music for the first time as Dyo including her first release Arena along with Go All The Way featuring Mr Eazi. In January 2020, Dyo released her debut EP 'Dyologue' which featured production from GuiltyBeatz and JAE5. Later that year, Dyo released a collaboration with Nigerian artist Simi called 'Let Them Talk' and was also credited as songwriter on Brit and Grammy nominated artist NAO's track "Woman" featuring Lianne La Havas.

In 2021, Dyo's songwriting credits include "Way Too Long" by Nathan Dawe featuring Anne-Marie and MoStack as well as Jesy Nelson's single "Boyz" featuring Nicki Minaj.

== Discography ==
=== Extended plays ===
Title	Details
Resonance	Released: 28 April 2014; Label: Killing Moon Records; Formats: Digital download, CD

=== Singles ===
==== As featured artist ====
Title	Year	Peak chart positions				Certifications
Title	Year	UK	AUS	IRE	SCO	Certifications
"Oopsy Daisy" (Chipmunk featuring Dayo Olatunji)	2009	1	–	7	1	BPI: Platinum
"Heatwave" (Wiley featuring Ms D)	2012	1	31	8	1	BPI: 2× Platinum
"Can You Hear Me? (Ayayaya)" (Wiley featuring Skepta, JME & Ms D)	2012	3	–	26	3	BPI: Platinum
"Reload" (Wiley featuring Chip & Ms D)	2013	9	–	83	10	BPI: Silver
"Sexual" (NEIKED featuring Dyo)	2016	5	4	2	3	BPI: 3× Platinum; ARIA: 3× Platinum; BEA: Platinum; BVMI: Gold; FIMI: Gold; IFPI DEN: Platinum; IFPI NOR: Platinum; RMNZ: 3× Platinum; SNEP: Platinum
"—" denotes single that did not chart or was not released.

=== Songwriting credits ===
Title	Year	Artist(s)	Album	Credits	Written with
"Put It Down" (featuring Ms. D)	2012	Loick Essien	I.D Mixtape	Featured artist/Co-writer	Loick Essien
"Can You Hear Me? (Ayayaya)" (featuring Skepta, JME and Ms. D)	2012	Wiley	The Ascent	Featured artist/Co-writer	Richard Cowie, Rodney Hwingwiri, Joseph Adenuga, Jamie Adenuga, Nayla "Sillkey" Largie
"Reload" (featuring Ms. D and Chip)	2013	Wiley	The Ascent	Featured artist/Co-writer	Richard Cowie, Michael Orabiyi, Talay Riley
"Bounce"	2013	Iggy Azalea	The New Classic	Co-writer	Amethyst Kelly, Michael Di Scala, Mark Hadfield, Joecim Papp, Talay Riley, Natalie Sims
"Sexual" (featuring Dyo)	2016	Neiked	Non-album single	Featured artist/Co-writer	Victor Radstrom, Elina Stridh
"My Ones" (featuring Dyo)	2016	Chip	Power Up EP	Featured artist/Co-writer	Jahmaal Fyffe, Martin Prospere
"Lonely Night"	2017	Fifth Harmony	Fifth Harmony	Co-writer	Jason Evigan, Ally Hernandez, Dinah Jane, Lauren Jauregui, Normeni Hamilton, Stefan Johnson, Jordan Johnson, Marcus Lomax
"What Lovers Do" (featuring SZA)	2017	Maroon 5	Red Pill Blues	Co-writer	Adam Levine, Brittany Talia Hazzard, Jason Evigan, Solana Rowe, Victor Radstrom, Elina Stridh
"Bad Vibe" (featuring Lotto Boyz and Mr Eazi)	2018	M.O	Non-album single	Co-writer	Scott Hoffman, Daniel Traynor, Oluwatosin Ajibade
"Calypso" (with Stefflon Don)	2018	Luis Fonsi	Vida	Co-writer	Luis Lopez-Cepero, Maurico Rengifo, Andres Torres, Stephanie Allen
"Name on It" (featuring Burna Boy)	2018	Four of Diamonds	TBA	Co-writer	Daniel Traynor, Tre Jean-Marie, Damini Ogulu
"Love Ain't Enough"	2018	Jacob Banks	Village	Co-writer	Jacob Banks, Jazmine Sullivan, Kazza Alexander, Charles Harmon, Benedetto Rotondi
"Stupid Things" (featuring Saweetie)	2018	Four of Diamonds	TBA	Co-writer	Daniel Heloy Davidsen, Peter Wallevik, Mich Hansen, Caroline Ailin, Neil Ormandy, Gino Borri
"Wondering" (featuring Chip)	2018	M.O	Non-album single	Co-writer	Daniel Traynor, Ali Ahmed, Jahmaal Fyffe
"Favourite Thing"	2019	Fleur East	Fearless	Co-writer	Fleur East, Philip Plested, George Tizzard, Richard Parkhouse
"Woman" (featuring Lianne La Havas)	2020	NAO	And Then Life Was Beautiful	Co-writer	Neo Joshua, Rowan Perkins, Dayyon Alexander Drinkard, Lianne La Havas, Andrew Vickery
"Way Too Long" (featuring Anne-Marie & Mostack)	2021	Nathan Dawe	TBA	Co-writer	Daniel Traynor, Scribz Riley, Uzoechi Emenike, Tre Jean-Marie, Ryan Ashley, Nathan Dawe, Anne-Marie, Mostack
"Boyz" (featuring Nicki Minaj)	2021	Jesy Nelson	TBA	Co-writer	Abby Keen, Amanda Atoui, Avital Margulies, Hanni Ibrahim, Patrick Jordan-Patrikios, Jesy Nelson, Nicki Minaj
