= Bonkers (compilation album series) =

British compilation album series

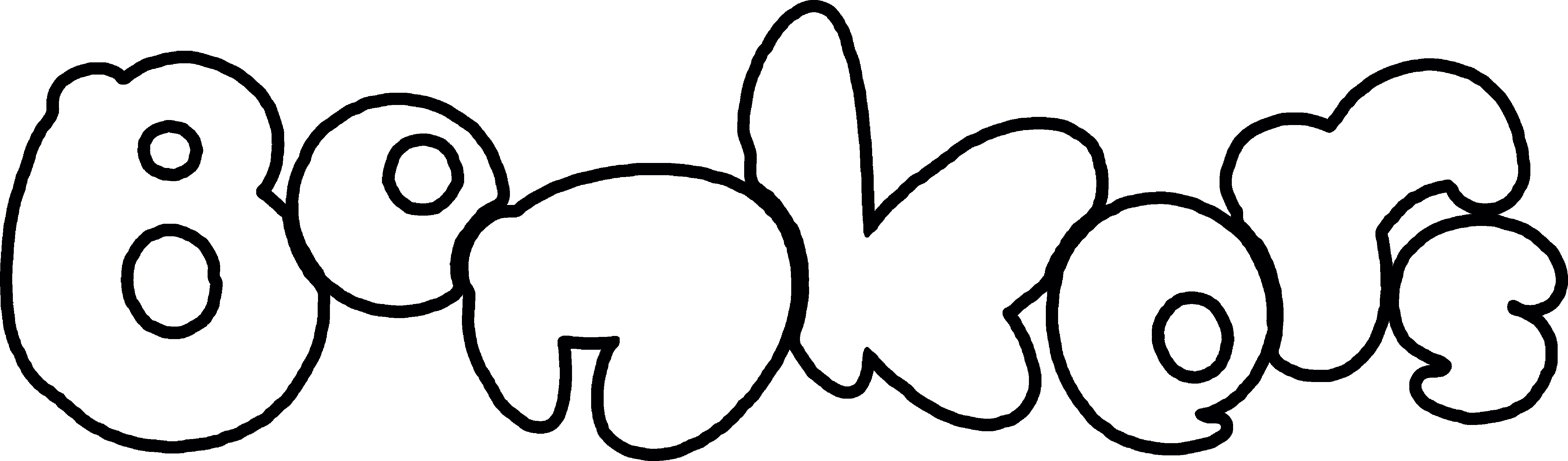

Compilation album by various artists
- Released: 1996–2009
- Genres: UK hardcore, happy hardcore, freeform hardcore, gabber
- Labels: React Music Limited, Resist Music, All Around the World
- Compilers: Hixxy, Sharkey, Dougal, Sy, Vibes, Scott Brown, Breeze & Styles, Re-Con, Marc Smith, Neophyte, Gammer, CLSM, Kutski, Druid, Brisk & Ham, Kevin Energy, Chris Unknown

The Bonkers series was one of the leading happy hardcore compilation series in the UK. The first release was in 1996 on the record label React (now Resist). It was available on 2xCD and 2xTC formats. DJs Sharkey and Hixxy were signed by React, and they released "Bonkers", the first in a series of albums that has become the best-selling hardcore compilation series of all time. As of 11 May 2009, the series had reached its nineteenth release, titled Bonkers: The Original Hardcore.

== History ==
The Bonkers name was based on the bar with the same name at Butlins Minehead (which has since changed to an Irish Bar). DJ Hixxy said in an interview with Vice “React wanted to sign 'Toytown', so we went up to London to meet them. I said, 'Listen, forget ‘Toytown’. You can have that, no problem. But I’ve got a bigger idea.' It totally changed the meeting. We sat and discussed [the idea for the happy hardcore compilation albums] 'Bonkers' for hours. The name came from a bar in Minehead Butlin’s that we’d played with Ramos and Supreme. I just loved the name.” Frequent contributors to the Bonkers collection include DJ Hixxy, DJ Dougal, DJ Sharkey, Neophyte and Scott Brown.

In 2019, the music publication DJ Mag published a retrospective article about the Bonkers album series, highlighting how it had "ushered in a new era" even though the critical reception at the time had been varied.

Bonkers has also been licensed for local release in Australia via Central Station Records. Bonkers 1-15 was also licensed to "Get over the records" in 2005 for Japanese branded releases. The Japanese edition of Bonkers vol. 1 went on sale on 26 October 2005 with a full TV advert in Japanese. "Get Over the Records" only released Bonkers 1-7 in the Japanese market and has since 2007 stopped releasing albums altogether.

In June 2008, Hardcore online news site 'happyhardcore.com' announced that British dance label All Around the World (AATW) had purchased the rights to Bonkers starting from what would have been volume 18, set to be released in 2009. There had been speculation about a label change for some time, but AATW finally confirmed it. The UK Hardcore genre, which has seen a recent unprecedented rise in popularity, has already helped AATW in securing number one chart positions with its Clubland Xtreme Hardcore releases. The label also expressed their desire to expand the Bonkers brand, suggesting the use of Universal Music TV as their distributor for future releases, as they do for their successful Clubland compilations. All Around the World relaunched the Bonkers series on 11 May 2009 under the title Bonkers: The Original Hardcore, which was mixed by Hixxy, Sharkey and Chris Unknown.

In 2017, Scottish rave promoters Twisted Events and Intenzifi revived the name with annual Bonkers events in Scotland (2017, 2018, 2019, 2020 missed due to Government action regarding Covid-19, 2021 and 2022).

In 2021, Scottish Internet Radio Station Beat 106 created the Bonkers Beats radio series alongside Hixxy, Sharkey, Dougal and Scott Brown. The show features previous Bonkers contributors.

In 2022, Bonkers started touring events up and down the United Kingdom.

September 2023 - Bonkers published a Mission Statement regarding is to relaunch in October as two record labels by Sharkey and Al Twisted. The main "Bonkers" which would have a multi-genre approach with all forms of Hard Rave and "Bonkers Legacy" celebrating the past.

== Compilation series overview ==
| Title | Mixed by | Release date | Peak chart positions | Certifications |
| Title | Mixed by | Release date | UK Comp | Certifications |
|---|---|---|---|---|
| Bonkers | Hixxy, Sharkey | 1996 | 25 | UK: Silver |
| Bonkers 2: Now We're Totally Bonkers | Hixxy, Sharkey | 1997 | 10 | |
| Bonkers 3: A Journey into Madness | Hixxy, Sharkey, Dougal | 1997 | 31 | UK: Gold |
| Bonkers 4: World Frenzy | Hixxy, Sharkey, Dougal | 18 June 1998 | 8 | UK: Silver |
| Bonkers 5: Anarchy in the Universe | Hixxy, Sharkey, Dougal | 26 October 1998 | 12 | |
| Bonkers 6: Wheel Crazy | Dougal, Sy, Vibes | 19 April 1999 | 10 | |
| Bonkers 7: Millennium Fever | Hixxy, Dougal, Sy | 4 October 1999 | 18 | |
| Bonkers 8: The Rezurrection | Hixxy, Sharkey, Sy | 22 July 2002 | 36 | |
| Bonkers 9: Hardcore Mutation | Hixxy, Sharkey, Scott Brown | 18 November 2002 | 27 | |
| Bonkers X | Hixxy, Sharkey, Scott Brown | 26 May 2003 | 18 | |
| Bonkers XI: Forevolution | Hixxy, Sharkey, Scott Brown | 15 September 2003 | 34 | |
| Bonkers 12: The Dirty Dozen | Hixxy, Sharkey, Scott Brown, Breeze & Styles | April 2004 | 7 | |
| Bonkers 13: Hardcore Horror Show | Hixxy, Sharkey, Scott Brown, Dougal | 18 October 2004 | 13 | |
| Bonkers 14: Hardcore Strikes Back | Hixxy, Sharkey, Scott Brown, Dougal | 30 May 2005 | 12 | |
| Bonkers 15: Legends of the Core | Hixxy & Re-Con, Sharkey & Marc Smith, Scott Brown & Neophyte, Dougal & Gammer | 5 December 2005 | 33 | |
| Bonkers 16: Maximum Hardcore Energy! | Hixxy & Re-Con, Sharkey & CLSM feat. Kutski, Scott Brown & Gammer | 10 July 2006 | 15 | |
| Best of Bonkers | Hixxy & Re-Con, Sharkey & Druid, Scott Brown | 15 January 2007 | 9 | |
| Bonkers 17: Re-Booted | Brisk & Ham, Sharkey & Kevin Energy, Scott Brown & Marc Smith | 29 October 2007 | 18 | |
| Bonkers: The Original Hardcore | Sharkey, Chris Unknown, Hixxy | 11 May 2009 | 8 | |
| The Annual | Sharkey & Rob IYF, Klubfiller, Mike Reverie, Sharkey | 19 December 2024 | | |

== Bonkers ==
Bonkers

Compilation album by various artists
- Released: 15 July 1996
- Genres: Happy hardcore, hardcore techno, gabber
- Length: 134:32
- Label: React
- Compilers: Hixxy, Sharkey

Bonkers chronology
| Bonkers (1996) | Bonkers 2: Now We're Totally Bonkers (1997) |

- Disc 1: Mixed by Hixxy
1. Hixxy & MC Sharkey - "Toytown"
2. Dougal & Eruption - "Party Time (Remix)"
3. Hixxy & Ikon - "The Wizard of Oz"
4. Hixxy - "Thumper"
5. Hopscotch & Dougal - "Steam Train"
6. Hixxy & Bananaman - "Together Forever"
7. Dr Who (Northern Lights) - "Love of My Life"
8. A Sense Of Summer - "On Top (Hixxy Remix)"
9. Highlander - "Hold Me Now (Bass-D & King Remix)"
10. Bass-D & King Matthew feat. DJ XD - "Like a Dream"
11. DJ Seduction & Eruption - "Bust the New Jam (Remix)"
12. Seduction - "Step To The Side'"
13. Vinylgroover & Quatro - "Calypso Summer"
14. Brisk (artist) - "Airhead (SMD Remix)"
15. Eruption - "Let the Music (Original Mix)"
16. Force & Styles - "Funfair (Exclusive Remix)"
17. Hixxy - "A - Ha Ha Ha"
18. Scott Brown Vs DJ Rab S - "Now Is the Time (Hixxy & Trixxy Remix)"
- Disc 2: Mixed by Sharkey
1. Marc Smith & Sharkey - "Truth"
2. Force & Styles - "All Systems Go"
3. Terrible Twins - "Burn This Joint (Tekno Dred & Helix Mix)"
4. Seb - "Rainbow Islands (Sharkey Mix)"
5. Billy Bunter, D-Zyne, Supreme - "Outside World"
6. Vampire - "Teknostorm (Sharkey Remix)"
7. Ham - "Is There Anybody There"
8. Druid & Bananaman - "Tweedledum"
9. Sy & Sharkey - "Feel the Heat"
10. Druid & Sharkey - "Bonkers Anthem"
11. A Sense Of Summer - "Techno Round the World (Remix)"
12. Druid & Sharkey - "Pumpin'"
13. Druid & Sharkey - "Rocket to the Moon"
14. Druid & Sharkey - "Frantik"
15. MC Sharkey - "Revolution (Slipmatt Remix)"
16. Brisk - "On & On"
17. Force & Styles - "Wonderland"

== Bonkers 2: Now We're Totally Bonkers ==
Bonkers 2: Now We're Totally Bonkers

Compilation album by various artists
- Released: 28 April 1997
- Genres: UK hard house, hardcore techno, gabber
- Length: 150:32
- Label: React
- Compilers: Hixxy, Sharkey

Bonkers chronology
| Bonkers (1996) | Bonkers 2: Now We're Totally Bonkers (1997) | Bonkers 3: A Journey into Madness (1997) |

Professional ratings
Review scores
| Source | Rating |
|---|---|
| Allmusic | 4/5 stars |

- Disc 1: Hixxy Mix
1. Evolve - "The Living Dream" - feat Lisa - 4:51
2. Antisocial - "My Way" - 4:19
3. Demo - "I've Got a Feeling" - 1:37
4. A Sense of Summer - "On Top (Hixxy '97 Mix)" - 4:13
5. Antisocial - "Now You've Got" - 5:00
6. Antisocial - "Forever Young" - 4:49
7. Antisocial - "Whistle" - 4:17
8. Hixxy & Sunset - "People's Party" - 4:38
9. The DJ Unknown Project - "Critical Heights (DJ Hixxy remix)" - 4:28
10. Vinylgroover - "Wham Bam" - 1:25
11. Fade & Melody - "Is This Love?" - 2:43
12. Fade & Bananaman - "A Dreams Surprise" - 2:30
13. Dougal & Mickey Skedale - "Don't Go Breaking My Heart" - 2:52
14. Antisocial - "Antisocial" - 3:46
15. DJ Demo - "Your Mine (Slipmatt Remix)" - 4:07
16. Evolve - "Sugar & Spice" - 2:41
17. Blitz, Blaze & Revolution - "Big Up the Bass" - 2:09
18. Antisocial - "24-7" - 5:43
19. Antisocial - "Scream" - 3:56
20. Force & Styles - "Paradise & Dreams" - 4:39
- Disc 2: Sharkey Mix
1. Ramos, Supreme & UFO - "Ravestation (X-clusive RSR remix)" - 5:39
2. Ramos, Supreme & UFO - "Tekniq" - 3:32
3. Druid & Energy - "Future Dimensions" - 3:53
4. Bang the Future - "Body Slam" - 4:57
5. GSI - "Twister" - 5:49
6. Darryl - "Whores in the House" - 3:07
7. Quatro - "Rock 'n' Roll" - 3:52
8. Druid & Trixxy - "E-Motion" - 4:01
9. Rapido - "Inside Beat" - 4:32
10. Marc Smith - "Boom 'n' Pow (Exclusive Marc Smith Remix)" - 4:21
11. Fury - "Droppin' Bombs (Exclusive remix)" - 3:15
12. Sharkey & Trixxy - "Genesis" - 5:59
13. Helix - "UR Everything" - 5:03
14. Sharkey & Trixxy - "Therapy" - 5:52
15. Sharkey - "Revolution pt.1" - 4:27
16. Trixxy - "See The Stars" - 2:54
17. Eclipse - "Ultraworld 5" - 4:15

== Bonkers 3: A Journey into Madness ==
Bonkers 3: A Journey into Madness

Compilation album by various artists
- Released: 20 October 1997
- Genres: UK hard house, hardcore techno, gabber
- Length: 222:25
- Label: React
- Compilers: Hixxy, Sharkey, Dougal

Bonkers chronology
| Bonkers 2: Now We're Totally Bonkers (1997) | Bonkers 3: A Journey into Madness (1997) | Bonkers 4: World Frenzy (1998) |

- Disc 1: Mixed by Hixxy
1. Hixxy & Bananaman - "Together Forever (Evolve Remix)" - 5:06
2. Hixxy & Sharkey - "Return to Toytown" - 4:45
3. Daydream - "Galaxy" - 5:06
4. Q-Tex - "Power of Love '97 (The Digital Boy Italian Rave Remix)" - 2:44
5. Visa - "Fly Away" - 2:38
6. Daydream - "Make Your Own Kind of Music" - 3:52
7. Bang! - "Cloudy Daze" - 4:03
8. Spitfire - "Feel This Way" - 4:23
9. 4 Tune Fairytales - "Take Me to the Wonderland" - 2:24
10. Fade & Melody - "Liquid Night" - 4:17
11. Antisocial - "Fairytale" - 4:29
12. Antisocial - "See Me Through" - 5:19
13. Antisocial - "Legends" - 4:57
14. Antisocial - "Happy Days" - 4:00
15. Hixxy - "Starry Night" - 4:35
16. Antisocial - "Need Your Love" - 5:02
- Disc 2: Mixed by Sharkey
1. Sharkey & UFO - "The Beginning of the End" - 1:53
2. UFO - "Inner Sanctum" - 4:48
3. Ramos & UFO - "The Ravechief" - 4:25
4. Supreme & UFO - "Trip to the Other Side" - 6:34
5. Brisk & Trixxy - "Back to the Top" - 4:20
6. Druid & UFO - "Temporal Rift" - 4:19
7. Sharkey & UFO - "Terra Nova (Exclusive Bonkers Mix)" - 5:31
8. Quattro & Dizzy D - "Future Trance Project 2" - 4:47
9. Brisk & Trixxy - "Rock the Beat" - 4:15
10. Energy & Loopy - "Overdose" - 4:03
11. Slam - "Influence (Slam & Helix Remix)" - 3:34
12. Slam & Helix - "Acid Break" - 3:33
13. Trixxy - "Here to Invade" - 4:17
14. Eclipse - "Devastator" - 4:31
15. Marc Smith (hardcore artist) - "Nothing More" - 4:14
16. Go Mental - "I Can Feel It (VIP Acid & Bass Mix)" - 4:47
17. Sharkey - "Sound Assassin (Exclusive Instrumental Mix)" - 3:41
18. Marc Smith - "The Procrastinator" - 5:47
19. Sharkey & UFO - "The End of the Beginning" - 0:29
- Disc 3: Mixed by Dougal
1. Dougal & Mickey Skeedale - "Gotta Go (Remix)" - 4:22
2. E-Logic & DNA - "Going All the Way" - 4:07
3. Innovate - "It's Out There" - 3:44
4. Dougal - "Tranquility" - 4:18
5. Triple J - "Follow the Sun" - 4:30
6. Euphony - "Dancin' in the Rain" - 3:32
7. Hopscotch & Dougal - "Steamtrain (Remix)" - 4:52
8. Dougal & Mickey Skeedale - "Re-Create Creation" - 4:52
9. Triple J - "Have It All" - 5:07
10. Ham, Demo & Justin Time - "The Big Spill (Demo Remix)" - 3:47
11. Breeze - "Jump a Little Higher" - 5:03
12. Dougal & DNA - "Tears in Your Eyes" - 4:40
13. Demo - "Muzik (Ham Remix)" - 4:18
14. Fade & Bananaman - "Dream's Surprise (Seduction Remix)" - 3:58
15. Innovate - "Talkin' 'Bout Love" - 3:35
16. Stompy - "Follow Me" - 5:20
17. Innovate - "Stop Me" - 4:22

== Bonkers 4: World Frenzy ==
Bonkers 4: World Frenzy

Compilation album
- Released: 18 May 1998
- Genres: UK hard house, hardcore techno, gabber
- Length: 3:31:50
- Label: React Music Limited

chronology
| Bonkers 3: A Journey into Madness | Bonkers 4: World Frenzy | Bonkers 5: Anarchy in the Universe |

Disc 1: Hixxy's Mix

1. Slashing Funkids - "Imagination" - 5:07
2. Los Bonitos - "The Lights" - 4:10
3. Sequel Base - "The Third Chapter" - 3:05
4. OMG - "Different Outlook" - 5:22
5. The Saints - "Fire" - 4:56
6. Sub-Ace & Aura - "A Guiding Light" - 2:12
7. OMG - "14th Dream" - 4:58
8. Bananaman & Blitz - "The Quickening" - 1:51
9. Q-Tex - "Equazion Pt 9" - 4:03
10. 2 without Heads - "U & Me" - 2:23
11. Visa - "Don't Go Away" - 4:03
12. Devil Licious - "By My Side" - 5:30
13. OMG - "The One" - 4:24
14. Q-Tex - "Power of Love '98" - 3:40
15. Unique - "Distant Skies" - 3:20
16. Devilicious - "Better Days" - 4:20

Disc 2: Sharkey's Mix

1. Johnny Go Mental - "Acid Rain" - 6:48
2. Fury - "De-Sensitize (98 Remix)" - 4:25
3. Equinox - "The Hustler" - 5:21
4. Marc Smith - "Encounters" - 6:44
5. Brisk & Trixxy - "Back to the Top (Remix)" - 4:39
6. Energy - "Future Dimensions Pt 2" - 4:37
7. Helix & Tekno Dred - "Mindless Pleasure" - 4:28
8. Energy - "The King of Rock" - 4:48
9. Slam - "The Bell" - 4:37
10. Eclipse - "Light Cycle" - 3:54
11. Marc Smith & Sharkey - "Death by Stereo" - 5:34
12. Marc Smith - "Gotta Hold on" - 5:33
13. Marc Smith - "On Two Turntables" - 4:22
14. Sharkey - "It's a Hard Life" - 5:02
15. Sharkey - "Product of Society" - 3:50

Disc 3: Dougal's Mix

1. Innovate - "Innovate Anthem" - 4:35
2. Dougal & Mickey Skeedale - "Don't You Realise" (feat Jenna) - 3:36
3. Datcha & DNA - "Dub Star" - 3:28
4. Brisk & Trixxy - "Eye Opener" - 4:09
5. Dougal & Mickey Skeedale - "Life Is Like a Dance (Remix)" - 4:41
6. S-Scape - "Express Yourself" - 3:56
7. Bang! - "Shooting Star" - 4:07
8. Seduction - "Leaving the World Behind" - 4:30
9. Unique - "Feelin' Fine" - 5:14
10. Dougal & Skeedale - "Words of Wisdom" - 5:13
11. Bang! - "Sailaway" - 3:39
12. Breeze - "Let's Fly" - 4:24
13. Sub-Ace & Aura - "My Dreams" - 5:24
14. Dougal & Skeedale - "Zurich (Storm Remix)" - 4:29
15. Dyanoiss - "The Underground" - 3:44 - (G. Henderson & L. Horsfield)
16. The Projek - "Sweet Thing" - 2:51
17. Innovate - "The Universe" - 5:22

== Bonkers 5: Anarchy in the Universe ==
Bonkers 5: Anarchy in the Universe

Compilation album
- Released: 26 October 1998
- Genres: UK hard house, hardcore techno, gabber
- Length: 3:42:16
- Label: React Music Limited

chronology
| Bonkers 4: World Frenzy | Bonkers 5: Anarchy in the Universe | Bonkers 6: Wheel Crazy |

Disc 1: Hixxy's Mix

1. Hixxy & UFO - Eternity Has Passed - 4:43
2. Elevate - Virtual Dreams (Euro Mix) - 4:08
3. O.M.G. - Definition of Hardcore - 5:30
4. Quest - Reach for Love - 6:21
5. Hixxy & UFO - Back in Business - 4:00
6. Hixxy & Sunset Regime - New Day Dawning - 5:05
7. Vinylgroover & Ed C - Bright Eyes (Select Remix) - 4:21
8. Hixxy & Sunset Regime - Legends - 5:37
9. Elevate - Together Again - 4:10
10. Sy & Unknown - Listen to the Ace (Hixxy Remix) - 4:21
11. Hixxy & Sunset Regime - Desire - 4:10
12. Sy & Unknown feat. Storm - Scratchin' (Remix) - 4:54
13. Triple J - Follow the Sun (Hixxy & Sunset Regime Remix) - 6:00
14. Scott Brown - Hardcore Vibes - 4:10
15. Scott Brown - Rockin' Strong - 4:43
16. Scott Brown - Liberation - 4:14

Disc 2: Sharkey's Mix

1. Eclipse vs Force Mass Motion - Point Zero - 5:28
2. DJ Fury - Lemonade Raygun (Remix) - 3:40
3. DJ Energy - Warped Reality - 4:02
4. Sharkey & Eclipse - Mind Launch - 3:12
5. Surgery - Cybersurfin' - 5:17
6. Marc Smith - Rok the House - 3:52
7. Helix - Cluster - 3:50
8. Sharkey - The Awakening - 6:41
9. Sharkey - Distant Dreams - 4:31
10. Tekno Dred & Ad Man - A Voice Spoke to Me (Helix Remix) - 4:09
11. Marc Smith & Sharkey - It's All Just Hardcore - 4:52
12. DJ Energy & Loopy - Overdose (Sharkey '98 Remix) - 3:29
13. Terminal Force - Don't Move - 4:52
14. Helix - Now Control - 5:36
15. Dark Myth - Fucking Trippy - 3:08
16. Sharkey & Eclipse - The Warning - 3:35

Disc 3: Dougal's Mix

1. Triple J - Wonderful World - 4:48
2. Innovate - Just Believe - 4:34
3. Dougal & Mickey Skeedale - Back to the Future - 5:16
4. Force & Styles - Fireworks (Storm Remix) - 4:21
5. Innovate - Invincible - 6:03
6. Dougal - Sky High (Storm Remix) - 4:09
7. Dougal & Mickey Skeedale - Emerald (Remix) - 4:54
8. TKM - Time Out - 4:48
9. Dougal & Mickey Skeedale - Peace of Mind - 5:05
10. Quest - Images of You - 3:56
11. Faber - A Better Day - 3:56
12. Breeze & DNA - High in the Sun - 4:55
13. Dougal & Eruption - Party Time (Exclusive Remix) - 4:52
14. Bang! - Break of Dawn - 3:37
15. Bang! - Shooting Star (Unique Remix) - 3:45
16. Unique - Higher Ground - 6:12

== Bonkers 6: Wheel Crazy ==
Bonkers 6: Wheel Crazy

Compilation album
- Released: 19 April 1999
- Genres: UK hard house, hardcore techno, gabber
- Length: 3:52:11
- Label: React Music Limited

chronology
| Bonkers 5: Anarchy in the Universe | Bonkers 6: Wheel Crazy | Bonkers 7: Millennium Fever |

Disc 1: Dougal's Mix

1. Innovate - Captured - 5:11
2. Tkm - Sitar - 5:16
3. Dougal & Mickey Skeedale - Revival - 4:08
4. Force & The Evolution - Perfect Dreams (DB7 Back for 99 Mix) - 4:21
5. Innovate - Higher Ground - 5:16
6. DJ Seduction - Holding on (Vinylgroover Remix) - 3:45
7. Eumovater - Funkravebrother - 3:23
8. Dougal & Tkm - The Chant - 5:56
9. Breeze - I Feel U - 3:35
10. Ramos - Sunshine (Dougal & Skeedale Mix) - 3:01
11. Brisk & Trixxy - Eye Opener (Remix) - 4:09
12. Mickey Skeedale & Doctor Who - Emotion - 4:42
13. Stealth - See Me Climb (Brisk'S Electro Flava Mix) - 4:39
14. Eumovater - Musical Life - 4:19
15. Bang! - Hyperspace (Brisk Mix) - 2:42
16. The Projek - Rhythm On Time - 5:51
17. Euphony - Space Invader (Scott Brown Remix) - 4:08
18. Quest - Yin Yang - 4:25

Disc 2: Sy's Mix

1. Sy & Unknown - Here Comes the Music - 5:16
2. Stealth - Flower Needs the Rain (Brisk Mix) - 5:41
3. Elevate - Virtual Dreams (99 Remix) - 4:55
4. Vinyltrixta - Come Again - 4:00
5. Slippery Project - Something Like Dis (Slipmatt Mix) - 4:22
6. Sy & Unknown feat Elayne - Distant Love (Sy & Unknown Remix) - 4:00
7. Sy & Demo - Movin on - 5:13
8. Bang! - Give Me a Reason (Ham Mix) - 4:27
9. Sy & Unknown - What Is a DJ? (Remix) - 5:03
10. Class of 94 - Lift You One Stage Higher - 4:43
11. Ham, Demo & Justin Time - Here I Am (Remix) - 3:59
12. Sy & Demo - Sensation (Remix) - 5:04
13. Dj Seduction - Leaving the World Behind (Ham Mix) - 4:22
14. Sy & Unknown - Head in the Clouds - 5:03
15. Codeine - Natural High (Sy & Unknown Mix) - 3:37
16. Brisk & Trixxy - Euro Love - 4:45

Disc 3: Vibes' Mix

1. James Venus & Atomics - Heaven (Exclusive Bonkers Mix) - 5:15
2. Elevate - All I Need Is Love (Exclusive Bonkers Mix) - 4:54
3. S-Real - Sanctuary - 5:58
4. DJ Kaos - Delirious (Exclusive Bonkers Mix) - 5:46
5. CB Project - Screamin Dreams - 4:23
6. Dougal & Skeedale - Look at the Stars - 4:55
7. Techno-Phobic - The Rave Theme - 5:08
8. DJ Breeze - Complete Heaven - 4:05
9. James Venus - Night Driving - 5:39
10. DJ Slam - I'm Back (Exclusive Bonkers Remix) - 3:43
11. SMD - SMD 5 (Exclusive Bonkers Remix) - 3:33
12. DJ Stompy - This Is the Night - 4:40
13. Frisky feat Daniella - Clearly Now (Brisk Mix) - 3:56
14. DJ Vibes - Techno Wonderland (Stompy's Bonkers Mix) - 6:04
15. E-Logic - The Gate (Remix) - 5:19
16. Raver's Choice - Raver's Choice 8½ - 5:13

== Bonkers 7: Millennium Fever ==
Bonkers 7: Millennium Fever

Compilation album
- Released: 4 October 1999
- Genres: UK hard house, hardcore techno, gabber
- Length: 3:50:51
- Label: React Music Limited

chronology
| Bonkers 6: Wheel Crazy | Bonkers 7: Millennium Fever | Bonkers 8: The Rezurrection |

Disc 1: Hixxy's Mix

1. Hixxy & U.F.O - Seen The Future - 6:42
2. Hixxy & U.F.O - 1999 (Cover Version Mix) - 6:16
3. Sonic Boom Boys - World Apart - 4:45
4. Sonic Boom Boys - Tsunami - 5:44
5. Ferris & Arantz feat. Elaine - X=Y - 6:01
6. Jamie Baker & Karl Allen feat. Elaine - Under-Current - 4:53
7. Josh Ferris & Ben Arantz - The Rhythm - 4:43
8. In-Iki & El Niño - Timescape - 4:58
9. Hixxy - Warehouse - 6:27
10. In-Iki & El Niño - Lost In Love - 4:52
11. Scanners - Return of Mr.X - 4:05
12. In-Iki & El Niño - Remembrance - 3:45
13. Download - White Dust - 2:56
14. Hixxy - Adrenalin Rising - 3:58
15. Hixxy & U.F.O feat. Elaine - Baby Tainted - 5:18
16. Ina-State feat. Elaine - Forever Comes - 4:27

Disc 2: Dougal's Mix

1. Innovate - Dance With Destiny - 5:43
2. Dougal & Mickey Skeedale - Rockin' It - 4:11
3. Interstate - Lost Generation (Scott Brown Remix) - 3:47
4. Dougal & TKM - Totality - 5:29
5. North West - Full On - 4:56
6. Dougal & Mickey Skeedale - Translucent - 3:36
7. S Real - Blast It - 4:33
8. Dougal & TKM - Night Breeze - 5:18
9. Scott Brown - Healing Mind - 5:41
10. Force & Styles - Sunshine - 4:33
11. Breeze - Complete Heaven (Unique Remix) - 5:18
12. Steve Ed - Another Level - 6:04
13. Frisky - Another Day (Unique Remix) - 4:56
14. Bang! - Shooting Star (Unique Remix) - 3:24
15. DJ's Unite - Vol.1 (Hixxy Mix) - 4:21
16. Mickey Muddyman - Ocean Blue - 4:59

Disc 3: Sy's Mix

1. Sy & Unknown - Welcome to the New Skool - 4:27
2. The Collective - Kick It (Exclusive Bonkers Mix) - 4:15
3. Sy & Unknown feat. MC Storm - Everybody Say Yeah - 4:04
4. The Vampire - Warped Optimism - 4:26
5. Rhythm Warriors - Dance Sucker - 5:42
6. Interstate - Basic Nature - 4:42
7. Sy & Unknown feat MC Storm - Gotta Rock Ya! - 4:55
8. Sy & Demo - Stay with Me - 5:17
9. Jimmy J & Cru-L-T - Six Days (Sy & Unknown Mix) - 4:43
10. Tranzit feat. Chrissy - Beautiful Stranger - 4:53
11. Too Ruff - We Can Do This - 5:21
12. E-Logik feat MC Whizzkid - Run to Me (Brisk Remix) - 4:19
13. Jon Doe - BMH Volume III - 4:53
14. Rhythm Warriors - Addiction - 4:29
15. Sy & Unknown - Bring It Back - 3:13
16. Rapido - Ultraviolet - 4:08

== Bonkers 8: The Rezurrection ==
Bonkers 8: The Rezurrection

Compilation album
- Released: 15 July 2002
- Genres: UK hard house, hardcore techno, gabber
- Length: 3:25:59
- Label: React Music Limited

chronology
| Bonkers 7: Millennium Fever | Bonkers 8: The Rezurrection | Bonkers 9: Hardcore Mutation |

Disc 1: Hixxy's Mix

1. Antisocial - Get into Love (Hixxy Remix) - 6:37
2. Breeze & Styles - You're Shining - 5:06
3. Hixxy - Nothing - 5:31
4. Scott Brown - Elysium Plus - 4:45
5. Dowster & Uprise - Steps Ahead - 4:58
6. MC Storm - Just Accept It - 4:17
7. Hixxy - Feel It in the Air - 4:34
8. UFO - Deep Inside (Hixxy Remix) - 4:47
9. Antisocial - My Way (Hixxy Remix) - 5:15
10. Scott Brown - Gang Bang Society - 5:01
11. Hixxy & Styles - Rush-ins - 5:07
12. Styles & Breeze - Black Magic Bad Magic - 3:51
13. Scott Brown - Rock Rock On - 3:06
14. UFO - Music Makers - 6:04

Disc 2: Sharkey's Mix

1. K Complex - Indestructible - 3:46
2. Cynista vs Safe n Sound - Chemical Warfare - 4:21
3. Kevin Energy - Vertigo - 3:59
4. Dave Blackman and AMS vs Safe n Sound - Inverted Reality - 4:28
5. DJs Vinal and Devotion feat DJ Impact - Say It Again - 4:54
6. Cris E. Manic - Acid Aftermath - 3:49
7. Brisk & Fade - Skillz N Styles - 4:46
8. Kaos and Ethos - Get Rockin - 4:06
9. DJ Kaos - Baddest Ass (Exclusive Remix) - 5:03
10. Brisk & Ham - Serious Hardcore - 4:41
11. Marc Smith and Mennis - Thik And Fast - 5:13
12. 2 Damn Tuff - Blow The Roof - 5:40
13. Marc Smith vs Safe n Sound - Identify The Beat - 4:42
14. Sharkey, A.M.S. & Robbie Long - Where's The Party At? - 4:39
15. Robbie Long & Devastate - P.S.A. - 4:46

Disc 3: Sy's Mix

1. Marc Smith - Boom 'n' Pow - 5:09
2. Seb - Rainbow Islands (Sharkey Mix) - 5:19
3. Hopscotch & Dougal - Steamtrain - 4:25
4. Hixxy & Sharkey - Toytown - 2:30
5. Vampire - Teknostorm (Sharkey Remix) - 5:00
6. Druid & Sharkey - Bonkers Anthem - 3:56
7. Hixxy & Sunset - People's Party - 5:00
8. Force & Styles - All Systems Go - 4:49
9. Sharkey - Revolution - 5:21
10. Bang The Future - Body Slam - 5:42
11. Druid & DJ Energy - Future Dimensions - 3:12
12. Hixxy & Bananaman - Together Forever - 3:56
13. Force & Styles - Wonderland - 4:27
14. DJ Fade & Melody - Is This Love? - 3:43
15. Antisocial - Forever Young - 5:16

== Bonkers 9: Hardcore Mutation ==
Bonkers 9: Hardcore Mutation

Compilation album
- Released: 4 Nov 2002
- Genres: UK hard house, hardcore techno, gabber
- Length: 3:29:11
- Label: React Music Limited

chronology
| Bonkers 8: The Rezurrection | Bonkers 9: Hardcore Mutation | Bonkers X |

Disc 1: Hixxy

1. N-Trance - Set You Free (Hixxy Remix) - 3:55
2. Ufo + MC Marley - Connection - 5:01
3. Styles + Breeze - Sonic - 4:53
4. Dougal & Gammer - Go Widda Flow - 5:27
5. Kelly Llorenna - Heart Of Gold (Hixxy Remix) - 5:36
6. Dowster + Uprise - Here We Go - 4:06
7. Flip N Fill - Field Of Dreams (Hixxy Remix) - 4:31
8. Antisocial - Im Ready - 3:44
9. UFO - Breaka - 6:10
10. Dougal & Gammer - Fire In The Sky - 5:35
11. Breeze + Styles - Oxygen - 5:35
12. Insight feat Lynn Eden - If That's Alright With You - 2:58
13. Brisk, Fade & Kelly - New Sensation - 4:53
14. Charlie Lownoise & Mental Theo - Wonderful Days (Hixxy Remix) - 4:00

Disc 2: Sharkey

1. DJ Kevin Energy + Blackout - Crazy Styles (DJ's Vinal & Devotion Remix) - 7:12
2. Robbie Long & Devastate - 50,000 Watts Of Hardcore Power - 6:14
3. DJ Kevin Energy - Crescendos Of Ecstasy - 4:51
4. DJ Kevin Energy & Just Rich - Wanna be a DJ - 5:13
5. Simon Apex & Orion - Hardcore Frequency (Ethos Remix) - 4:14
6. Kaos & Ethos - Technorocker - 5:18
7. Brisk & Fade - Retro Rush - 5:12
8. Ethos & Dan Devotion - Party Zone - 4:39
9. Ethos & Brisk - Unlock Your Brain - 5:52
10. Sharkey, Kevin Energy, K-Complex & Just Rich - Visions Of Infinity (Sharkey & Kevin Energy Remix) - 4:16
11. Marc Smith - The Deviant - 3:32
12. Sharkey & K-Complex - Delusion - 4:55
13. Sharkey & A.M.S. - Mind Control - 4:59
14. Shanty, Tazz & Concept - Beast Of Hardcore - 4:43
15. Devastate & MC Marley - Terrabeat - 4:54

Disc 3: Scott Brown

1. Plus System - Neck Breaker - 5:08
2. Double Dutch - Heaven - 4:04
3. Scott Brown - Definition Of A Badboy - 5:29
4. Sy & Unknown - Bring Me Round to Love' (VIP Mix) - 2:55
5. Scott Brown - Rock You Softly - 4:01
6. Dougal & Gammer - Get Hype - 4:01
7. Scott Brown - Turn Up The Music (Breeze & Styles Mix) - 5:16
8. Q-Tex - Like An Angel - 4:44
9. Styles & Breeze - You're Shining - 5:28
10. Plus System - Take A Final Breath - 4:22
11. DJ Ruboy Vs Markos 13 - Distort Overload - 3:22
12. Q-Tex - Feel The Beats Bang - 4:12
13. The Playah - Hit 'Em - 3:39
14. Scott Brown - Ghosts - 4:31
15. Scott Brown & DJ Brisk - Do Not Attempt (Sukkaz) - 5:09

== Bonkers X ==
Bonkers X

Compilation album
- Released: 3 May 2003
- Genres: UK hard house, hardcore techno, gabber
- Length: 3:34:51
- Label: React Music Limited

chronology
| Bonkers 9: Hardcore Mutation | Bonkers X | Bonkers XI: Forevolution |

Disc 1: Hixxy

1. Hixxy - Thou Shalt Not Forget - 1:14
2. Planet Perfecto - Bullet In The Gun (Hixxy Remix) - 5:47
3. UFO - Punk - 4:39
4. Breeze & Styles - The Beat Kicks - 5:23
5. UFO & Marley - Underground - 6:19
6. Ultrabeat - Pretty Green Eyes (Hixxy, Styles & Breeze Remix) - 4:47
7. Hixxy - Summer Sensation - 5:12
8. Dougal and Gammer - Jam The Nightclub (Remix) - 4:56
9. Breeze & Styles - Future Shining - 5:29
10. DJ Weaver - Come Into My Dream - 6:16
11. DJ Stompy - Nu-beginning - 4:04
12. Sy and Unknown - Tekno Harmony 2003 - 5:05
13. Stargazer - Ultimate High (Breeze & Styles Remix) - 4:36
14. Dowster - Starlight - 5:45
15. G Spencer meets Dougal & Gammer - Wonderful Life - 2:36
16. UFO - Hardcore - 2:46

Disc 2: Sharkey

1. Ham - Kinda Funky - 4:47
2. Ham & MC Sharkey - Don't Stop - 3:40
3. Ham & Robbie Long - Get Hard - 2:56
4. CLSM - Sound of the Future - 4:40
5. CLSM - Liberation - 4:02
6. K Complex - Outta Control - 3:25
7. Dair & Devastate - Music Power - 5:06
8. DJ justrich and DJ phosphor - Ain't No Stoppin' This - 4:04
9. Social Outkast v Shanty, Tazz & Concept - Twist of Faith - 4:27
10. DJ Kevin Energy - Fuckin' With Da Frequency - 3:44
11. DJ Fade - The Future - 4:58
12. Scott Majestik - Acid Dreams - 2:31
13. DJ Fade - The Other Side - 4:11
14. Bass-X vs Scott Brown - Pilgrim (Kevin Energy & K Komplex Nu Energy Collective Remix) - 4:29
15. Marc Smith - Revival - 4:23
16. Stormtrooper and Social Outcast - Body Groove - 4:51
17. Sharkey and AMS Featuring Carol Sharland - Freedom - 5:21
18. Marc Smith - Give Yourself To Me - 4:23

Disc 3: Scott Brown

1. Scott Brown - Dehumanize (Synthetic Edit) - 5:00
2. Plus System - Commence - 3:53
3. Deejay Bee & Overflow Feat. Vision - Sunrise (Dougal & Gammer Remix) - 4:49
4. Scott Brown Feat. Donji - I'm In Heaven - 4:04
5. Scott Brown - The Saga Continues - 3:43
6. Scott Brown - This is Hardcore - 3:53
7. Dougal & Gammer - The 6th Gate - 5:04
8. Interstate - Hardcore Hustler - 5:28
9. Scott Brown - Synthetic Dreams - 4:57
10. Brisk & Brown - Back & Forth - 4:57
11. Art Of Fighters - Earthquake - 3:47
12. Hyperbass v Scott Brown - Life Or Death - 3:37
13. Tommy Knocker - The World Is Mine - 3:14
14. The Playah - Tha Bounce - 2:49
15. Scott Brown - How Else Can I Say It - 4:18

== Bonkers XI: Forevolution ==
Bonkers XI: Forevolution

Compilation album
- Released: 10 November 2003
- Genres: UK hard house, hardcore techno, gabber
- Length: 3:34:51
- Label: React Music Limited

chronology
| Bonkers X | Bonkers XI: Forevolution | Bonkers 12: The Dirty Dozen |

Disc 1: Hixxy

1. Adam Harris - Heavens Above (Hixxy Remix) - 5:35
2. Eclipse feat. Melvinia - 24-7 (Breeze & Styles Remix) - 4:48
3. Re-Con & Fluxx - Free Again - 4:59
4. G Spencer & Gammer - Steam - 5:18
5. Darren Styles - Takin' Me Higher - 4:10
6. DJ Weaver - Falling In (Hixxy Remix) - 5:15
7. Breeze & Styles - The Craft - 5:21
8. Dougal & Gammer feat. Stefan B - Fall From The Stars - 4:37
9. Hixxy & Styles - Takin' Over Me - 3:52
10. UFO Feat. Elaine - Far Away - 5:59
11. In Effect & Impact - Close Your Eyes - 5:53
12. Ultrabeat - Feeling Fine (Darren Styles Remix) - 4:38
13. Breeze & Styles - Drop The Beats - 4:20
14. DJ Kambel - No More Jokin (Sy & Unknown Remix) - 4:37
15. Re-Con - Rock Da Crowd - 3:58
16. 2 Players - Close Your Eyes (Hixxy & Spacey Remix) - 6:21

Disc 2: Sharkey

1. K Complex - Cyberspace! (Exclusive Bonkers Mix) Exclusive To Bonkers - 3:48
2. Gammer - The Power Within - 5:03
3. Kevin Energy & Chris C - Forward to the Past (Kevin Energy's Freeform Edit) - 2:42
4. Deviance & Desire - Voice of the Abyss - 4:00
5. CLSM - John Peel (not enough) (Fergus Mayhem Remix) Exclusive To Bonkers - 4:46
6. DJ Marc Smith - Gravity - Exclusive To Bonkers - 3:40
7. Sharkey Vs CLSM - Wicked MC - 5:07
8. Brisk & Ham - Sounds Legit - 4:53
9. CLSM - Hardstyle Beatz Exclusive To Bonkers - 3:08
10. Brisk & Ham - Get Down - 5:47
11. The Blizzard Boys - Rock The Jam - 4:08
12. Lee UHF - Let's Fight (Devastate's Vocal Overkill Remix) - 3:45
13. Impact & Exert - Phat as Fuck! - 4:30
14. Sharkey & Marc Smith - Utopia - Exclusive To Bonkers - 4:09
15. Scott Majestik - Sirens Exclusive To Bonkers - 2:52
16. Devastate - Crowd Noise Exclusive To Bonkers - 4:33
17. Sharkey - Funk D' Hardcore (K Komplex Special Bonkers Edit) Exclusive To Bonkers - 5:37
18. Robbie Long & AMS - Feelin' Good - 3:48

Disc 3: Scott Brown

1. Plus System - Prince of Darkness - 3:30
2. Brisk & Ham - Taste the Rainbow - 3:29
3. Scott Brown - Let The Beat Drop - 2:01
4. Scott Brown - Definition Of A Badboy (Hardcorevolution Remix) - 3:29
5. Dougal & Gammer - Stomp - 4:40
6. Scott Brown Meets Hyperbass - We're Droppin' This - 2:56
7. Euphony & DJ Storm - Blinded - 3:42
8. Sy & Unknown - Keep The Crowd Jumping - 2:12
9. Plus System - Darkness - 2:59
10. Brisk & Ham - Angel Eyes - 3:51
11. Plus System - Blue Anthem - 3:06
12. Scott Brown - Come On (Sy & Unknown Remix) - 2:11
13. Scott Brown - Fly With You - 3:28
14. Gammer - Kickin' Hard - 1:49
15. Evil Activities - Dedicated (To Those Who Tried To Hold Me Down) - 3:15
16. Dione - Pain Till I Die - 2:46
17. Evil Activities - To You Who Doubt Me (Feat. DJ Neophyte) - 2:44
18. Dr. Z-Vago - My Destiny - 2:22
19. Scott Brown feat. DJ Neophyte - Self Destruction - 4:21

== Bonkers 12: The Dirty Dozen - Mission: Hardcore ==
Bonkers 12: The Dirty Dozen

Compilation album
- Released: 12 April 2004
- Genres: UK hard house, hardcore techno, gabber
- Length: 4:49:42
- Label: React Music Limited

chronology
| Bonkers XI: Forevolution | Bonkers 12: The Dirty Dozen | Bonkers 13: Hardcore Horror Show |

Professional ratings
Review scores
| Source | Rating |
|---|---|
| Allmusic | 2/5 stars |

- Disc 1: Mixed by Hixxy
1. DJ UFO feat Shelly - Waiting - 5:34
2. Hixxy - Take a Look (Dub Mix) - 3:40
3. Hixxy & MC Storm - Just Accept It (Hixxy Remix) - 4:16
4. Dougal & Gammer - The Piano Tune - 4:54
5. Billy 'Daniel' Bunter & John Doe - Round & Round (Breeze & Styles Remix) - 4:02
6. Impact & In Effect - Close Your Eyes - 4:32
7. 69 - You're My Angel - 4:53
8. DJ Uplift - Midnight Resistance - 3:15
9. CLSM - Reaching Out (Billy 'Daniel' Bunter & CLSM Remix) - 4:47
10. DJ Weaver - Fallen Angel - 5:57
11. DJ UFO feat Shelly - Always - 5:35
12. Asa & S1 - Whole - 3:13
13. Yum-Yi feat Becky Judge - Tantric - 5:26
14. Hixxy - C.O.N. - 3:04
- Disc 2: Mixed by Sharkey
1. Kevin Energy and The *TING* - Power In The Light - 4:42
2. Lost Soul - Dark Side Of The Moon - 4:51
3. Mark Ashley and K Complex - Atomix Orbital - 4:41
4. Andy Vinal and Matt Style - Loosing Control (Remix) [sic] - 4:24
5. Invader - Enraptured Soulz - 4:41
6. Gammer - Can't Complete - 4:08
7. Wizbit & Ponder - New Zealand Story - 4:41
8. CLSM feat Bello B - Transmission To Mars - 4:00
9. Dougal & Gammer - Know The Score - 3:47
10. Robbie Long and Stormtrooper - Hitmen - 4:52
11. Marc Smith and Kevin Energy - That's The Hardcore - 3:45
12. V.A.G.A.B.O.N.D feat MC Wotsee - Hugger Mugger - 3:47
13. Impact - Funky Technician - 5:01
14. Marc Smith - What The Fuck - 3:41
15. A.M.S and Robbie Long - Kill Bill - 3:58
16. A.M.S and TAZZ - Getting Dirty - 4:26
17. Sharkey vs CLSM - Wicked MC (A.M.S Remix) - 4:55
18. Outsidaz - Punk - 3:43
- Disc 3: Mixed by Scott Brown
1. Plus System - This Is How We Do it - 5:22
2. Brisk & Ham - To the Floor - 3:10 (This is most likely the correct name, although it is uncertain if it is Dreadhead with "Chaos & Might")
3. Scott Brown feat Cat Knight - All About You - 5:30
4. Expression & GBH - Night Time (Sy & Unknown Remix) - 3:16
5. Brisk & Ham - Crazy Love - 4:47
6. Scott Brown feat DMO - Really Need You - 4:22
7. DJ Kurt - Rock Ya Hardcore - 4:27
8. Interstate - This Is My Bass - 4:22
9. Euphony & DJ Storm - First Kontact - 4:36
10. Breeze & Styles - Heartbeatz (Scott Brown Remix) - 5:06
11. Plus System - Is This The Future - 3:16
12. Scott Brown vs Marc Smith - Hardcore U Know The Score - 4:13
13. Endymion - Payback - 4:32
14. Scott Brown - This One's For All Of Us - 3:37
15. David Pamies - Cesar Benito - Torn (Scott Brown Karaoke Remix) - 2:54
16. Interstate - We Can Dance - 3:37
17. Scott Brown - Boomstick - 3:37
18. Neophyte & Evil Activities - Alles Kapot - 4:10
- Disc 4: Mixed by Breeze & Styles
1. Aluna - All Of My Life (Breeze & Styles remix) - 5:29
2. Breeze & Styles - Feel The Power - 4:27
3. Recon - The Sun - 5:24
4. Dougal & Gammer - 3000 Cycles - 4:05
5. Evil Angel - Today (Breeze & Styles Remix) - 4:55
6. Darren Styles - Skydivin - 4:09
7. Clear Vu - I Adore (Breeze & Styles Remix) - 3:24
8. Uplift & Cloudskipper - Revolution - 3:25
9. Euphonic feat Lisa Abbott - The One (Breeze & Styles Remix) - 4:24
10. Scott Brown feat Cat Knight - Flow - 4:31
11. Breeze & Styles - Electric (Bonkers Remix) - 4:37
12. Eclipse - Before Tomorrow (Breeze & Styles Remix) - 4:44
13. Breeze & UFO - Take Your Time - 4:58
14. David Pamies - Cesar Benito - Torn (Breeze & Styles Remix) - 4:49
15. Futureworld - Chemical Love (Hardcore Mix) - 4:32
16. Sonic State & MC Storm - I'm A Raver - 5:15

== Bonkers 13: Hardcore Horror Show ==
Bonkers 13: Hardcore Horror Show

Compilation album
- Released: 18 Oct 2004
- Genres: UK hard house, hardcore techno, gabber
- Length: 4:45:22
- Label: Resist Music

chronology
| Bonkers 12: The Dirty Dozen | Bonkers 13: Hardcore Horror Show | Bonkers 14: Hardcore Strikes Back |

- Disc 1: Hixxy's Old Skool Killa Kuts
1. Q-Tex - Equazion Remix EP - 2:28
2. Scott Brown - Detonated - 2:16
3. Jimmy J & Cru-l-t - Take Me Away (Slipmatt's Bangin' Remix) - 2:05
4. DJ Seduction - Sample Mania - 2:28
5. Dougal & Mickey Skeedale - Take Me On Up - 0:45
6. Kevin Energy - Hardcore Fever - 1:40
7. Kevin Energy - Wham Bam - 2:14
8. Helix - Get It Right - 3:21
9. Sy & Unknown - Critical Heights (Hixxy Remix) - 3:21
10. The Time Span - Shout Now (Hixxy Remix) - 4:39
11. Scott Brown - Do What You Like (The Rez Anthem) - 1:29
12. I2U - Euro Core - 2:03
13. Force & Styles - All Systems Go - 2:14
14. I2U - Euro Stomp - 2:24
15. Brisk - On And On - 3:43
16. Visa - All I Need (Original Mix) - 3:22
17. Demo - I've Got A Feeling - 4:08
18. Vinylgroover & The Red Hed - Virtual Dreams - 3:54
19. Hixxy - Bang The Future / Body Slam - 2:25
20. Brisk & Trixxy - Eye Opener - 2:02
21. Scott Brown - Andromeda - 2:25
22. Hixxy & UFO - Welcome - 2:47
23. Scott Brown - Turn Up The Music - 4:30
- Disc 2: Sharkey
1. Sharkey Ft. K-Complex - Overdrive (Exclusive Bonkers Mix) - 3:22
2. D - D1A (CLSM Remix) - 2:57
3. AMS - Black Notice - 2:43
4. K-Complex - Adagio - 5:12
5. A.M.S - Blazing Guns - 4:11
6. Kevin Energy & DJ Proteus - London-Helsinki (K-Complex Remix) - 3:17
7. Two's Company - Dreams (A.M.S Remix) - 5:50
8. A.M.S - Hardcore Revolution - 3:29
9. Robbie Long & Stormtrooper - Future Dimension - 3:41
10. Ham - Jump 2 Da Groove - 4:52
11. Cris.E.Manic - Just One More - 3:37
12. Visionary - Taste The Funk - 4:07
13. In Effect - Back With A Vengeance - 2:37
14. V.A.G.A.B.O.N.D - Chemicals In Motion - 4:46
15. Robbie Long & A.M.S - Kill Bill - 3:55
16. AC Slater - Overdose - 3:50
17. A.M.S - Dazed & Confused - 3:33
18. V.A.G.A.B.O.N.D - Bonecrusher - 4:21
19. Oli G - Gir - 4:31
- Disc 3: Scott Brown
1. Scott Brown - Rock Da Beat - 5:49
2. Scott Brown & Hyperbass - We're Droppin' This (Plus System Remix) - 3:55
3. Sy & Unknown - Rock It Like This - 2:44
4. Plus System - Let's All Get Down - 4:22
5. Scott Brown - Pro'To*Plasm - 3:08
6. Scott Brown - Neckbreaker (Sy & Unknown Remix) - 4:33
7. Scott Brown - Taking Drugs? - 4:11
8. Plus System - Rock That Body - 3:38
9. Insight - Only Your Love (Scott Brown Remix) - 4:00
10. Q-Tex - The Reason - 5:06
11. Brisk & Ham - In Your Life - 3:36
12. Endymion - Rock The Part-E - 3:47
13. Scott Brown - Don't Fuck With This - 3:52
14. The Viper & Tommyknocker - The Prophecy Unfolds (The Playah Remix) - 3:04
15. DJ Nosferatu - Have It Your Way - 4:33
16. Brisk & V.A.G.A.B.O.N.D - Punchdrunk - 4:06
17. Scott Brown - A Few Moments - 3:14
- Disc 4: Dougal
1. Dougal & Mickey Skeedale - Really Love You (Dougal & Gammer Remix) - 4:53
2. Dougal & Gammer feat. Jenna - Heaven On Earth - 5:27
3. Gammer - Back 2 Front - 3:11
4. Re-Con - Right Here - 4:19
5. United In Dance Ft. Lisa Marie - Still The One - 5:38
6. Hixxy & Styles - The Theme - 6:01
7. Jess - Find Your Way - 2:38
8. Dougal & Gammer - Get Hype (Scott Brown Remix) - 3:06
9. Mickey Skeedale Ft. Jenna - Through The Darkness (Dougal & Gammer Remix) - 4:19
10. Asa & S1 Ft. Lou Lou - Makin' Me Wanna Dance (Sy & Unknown Remix) - 3:23
11. Euphoria - Silver Dawn - 5:30
12. Dougal & Gammer - Xtreme - 5:50
13. Styles feat. Lisa Abbott - Getting Better - 5:04
14. Ham - Be Happy - 3:47
15. Uplift - Night Flight - 4:07
16. Mickey Skeedale - Close Your Eyes - 3:23
17. G Spencer & Gammer - Substance - 4:31
18. CLSM feat. Stefan B - Drifting Away - 4:24

== Bonkers 14: Hardcore Strikes Back ==
Bonkers 14: Hardcore Strikes Back

Compilation album
- Released: 30 May 2005
- Genres: UK hard house, hardcore techno, gabber
- Length: 4:52:04
- Label: Resist Music

chronology
| Bonkers 13: Hardcore Horror Show | Bonkers 14: Hardcore Strikes Back | Bonkers 15: Legends of the Core |

- Disc 1: Hixxy
1. Ramos, Supreme & Sunset Regime feat Lenny - All I Ever Wanted - 5:43
2. UFO Featuring Shelly - Something to Believe - 4:39
3. Re-Con & Chris Henry - Baby I Know You're Mine - 4:26
4. Scott Brown - Memories (Plus System Remix) - 4:39
5. UFO - Heaven In My Heart - 5:54
6. Geos- Power & The Glory - 6:27
7. Brisk & Ham - Crazy Love (Styles & Breeze RMX) - 4:43
8. N-Trance - Set You Free (Hixxy's Bonkers Remix) - 4:03
9. Frisk & Hujib - Believe (Styles & Breeze Mix) - 5:23
10. Ultrabeat - Pretty Green Eyes (Hixxy Remix) - 4:38
11. Darren Styles - Getting Better - 4:47
12. Scott Brown - Fly With You - 5:29
13. DJ Kurt - Rock Ya Hardcore (Hixxy Remix) - 4:36
14. Styles, Breeze & MC Storm - Dark Like Vader - 4:21
15. Hixxy - Open Up & Look Inside - 4:53
16. Gammer - Let Me Hear Ya - 3:44
- Disc 2: Sharkey
1. Ephexis - Tracktion - 1:53
2. Kevin Energy - The White Stuff (Kevin Energy Remix) - 5:32
3. Ephexis - Perpetuate - 3:22
4. Jon Doe - Frenzy (Billy Daniel Bunter & CLSM Remix) - 4:10
5. Sharkey & Jon Doe - Damage - 4:53
6. Bang the Future - Bodyslam (Billy 'Daniel Bunter' Bunter & CLSM Remix) - 3:47
7. Stormtrooper - Addictz - 4:27
8. AMS - Hardstyle Beatz - 4:19
9. Double Decka - Rock N Roll (Kevin Energy Remix) - 5:23
10. Social Outcast - Freedom (Kevin Energy Remix) - 4:23
11. Arkitech - De-Humanise - 4:28
12. K Complex & AMS - Echelon - 2:55
13. Arkitech - Under The Influence - 4:06
14. AMS - Show Me The Way - 3:11
15. Gammer - Got Ya - 2:55
16. Gammer feat MC Sharkey - Let's Get Rockin' - 4:53
17. AMS - Bounce to Da Beat - 2:56
18. AMS & Robbie Long feat MC Ethos - Wakey Wakey - 4:27
19. Brisk & Ham - Serious Hardcore (Vagabond Remix) - 4:38
- Disc 3: Scott Brown
1. Plus System - Bassline Of The Century - 5:08
2. Scott Brown - Neckbreaker (Plus System Remix) - 2:33
3. Eclipse - Be Happy (Brisk & Vagabond Remix) - 3:46
4. Plus System - Make You Freak - 3:06
5. Gammer - Into The Future - 4:56
6. Scott Brown - Rock You Softly 2005 - 4:20
7. Scott Brown - Serial Killer - 2:55
8. Plus System - Rhythm Machine - 2:33
9. Scott Brown & DMO - Call My Name - 4:44
10. Styles & Breeze - You're My Angel (Scott Brown Remix) - 4:44
11. Scott Brown & DMO - Just Walk Away - 2:54
12. Tekno Dred Alliance - Break Free (Scott Brown Remix) - 3:51
13. The Viper - Blow Da Club Down - 4:01
14. Tommyknocker - Shogun - 1:16
15. Evil Activities - Do You Like Bass (Tha Playah Remix) - 2:25
16. Scott Brown - Enemy - 2:21
17. Evil Activities - To You Who Doubt Me (Tommyknocker Remix) - 3:49
18. Scott Brown - Fuck You Up - 2:32
19. Scott Brown - Fuck Your Style - 4:29
- Disc 4: Dougal
1. Dougal & Gammer feat Lisa Marie - Drive Me Crazy - 5:21
2. Dougal & Gammer - Testing 1.2 - 4:22
3. Styles & Breeze - Oxygen (Styles & Breeze Exclusive Mix) - 2:35
4. Transit - Count the Hours - 5:05
5. Dougal & Eruption - Party Time (Essential Platinum Remix) - 3:54
6. Ultravibes - We Need More Core - 4:44
7. United in Dance Ft. JENNA - Shining Down - 4:09
8. Dougal & Gammer - Make Noise - 4:47
9. Dougal & Gammer - Mars Atx - 4:48
10. United in Dance feat Lisa Marie - Lift Me Above - 4:56
11. DJ Seduction - Raise Your Hands - 2:04
12. G Spencer & Gammer - Feel This Way - 2:36
13. Brisk & Ham - Getting High - 3:29
14. Hixxy & UFO - Welcome 2005 (Hixxy Remix) - 1:53
15. Billy Daniel Bunter & Jon Doe - Need Your Emotion (Hardcore Remix) - 2:35
16. Cobalt & Heffer - Express Ur Self - 3:53
17. Micky Skeedale - In The House - 2:25
18. DJ Vibes & Hattrixx - I Know - 2:27
19. Gammer - Ready For War - 3:55

== Bonkers 15: Legends of the Core ==
Bonkers 15: Legends of the Core

Compilation album
- Released: 5 December 2005
- Genres: UK hard house, hardcore techno, gabber
- Length: 4:58:50
- Label: Resist Music

chronology
| Bonkers 14: Hardcore Strikes Back | Bonkers 15: Legends of the Core | Bonkers 16: Maximum Hardcore Energy! |

Disc 1: Hixxy & Re-Con

1. Dreadhed - On Fire (Hixxy Remix) - 5:37
2. Paradise - See the Light (Sy & Unknown Remix) - 3:47
3. Heaven-7 - Dance Me - 4:20
4. Hixxy & Re-con - Love Comes - 4:20
5. Headtrippers - Life on Life (Squad-E Remix) - 5:25
6. Hixxy & Re-Con - We Can Do This - 4:43
7. Frantic & Resist - Spending My Time - 5:16
8. Scott Brown - Trance Sect / Lost Generation (Kevin Energy Megamix) - 4:31
9. Access 3 - Promised Land (Squad-E Remix) - 4:36
10. Re-Con - Enjoy - 4:44
11. Heaven-7 - Speak of Love - 4:20
12. Wizzkid & Gammer - Scream - 5:37
13. Re-Con - Pull Over - 3:56
14. D-Code - Out of My Hands (Squad-E Remix) - 5:12
15. Storm & Gammer - 21st Century Rush - 3:41
16. Geos - Gonna Take U High - 4:12
17. Styles & Breeze - Love Garden - 5:22

Disc 2: Sharkey & Marc Smith

1. Sharkey - Ascending Angels (Inst) - 6:06
2. Cube::Hard - Hold the Beat - 3:17
3. Carbon Based - Anger Ball (Kevin Energy Remix) - 5:21
4. Oli G vs Ephexis - Spatial Inversion - 5:30
5. Arkitech vs Double Decka - Life Is a Construct - 4:14
6. Sharkey vs Arkitech - Never Say Die - 4:58
7. Ephexis - Intensify - 3:58
8. Cube::Hard v CLSM - See You on the Other Side - 2:10
9. Ethos vs A.M.S. - Pump It Up - 2:45
10. Fergus Mayhem - Take Control - 3:14
11. Ham - Count of 3 - 2:03
12. Sean Apollo - Raise It Up (Kevin Energy Remix) - 5:25
13. Ham - Working Up a Sweat - 4:54
14. A.M.S vs Kevin Energy - Go Insane - 4:13
15. Kevin Energy vs K Complex - Suck My Rock - 4:26
16. Sharkey vs Stormtrooper - Lazerbeam Addict - 4:12
17. Sharkey - Pumpin' Religion - 4:46
18. Marc Smith vs Sharkey - Bring on the Noise - 4:56
19. Dreadhed - Take the Blame - 3:16

Disc 3: Scott Brown & Neophyte

1. Tommyknocker - Nocturnal Rituals (feat. MC Justice) - 4:50
2. Scott Brown - Capital Murder - 4:09
3. Bass-X - Motherfucker (Scott Brown Remix) - 3:21
4. Tommyknocker - Twist - 3:55
5. Scott Brown - I'll Get You - 4:28
6. Scott Brown - Fasten Your Seatbelt - 5:02
7. Tommyknocker - Domination - 4:28
8. Plus System - This Is How We Do It (Scott Brown Hardcore Mix) - 4:17
9. Scott Brown - We Don't Stop - 4:28
10. Masters Of Ceremony - A Way of Life (DJ Promo Remix) - 3:24
11. DJ D - Skullcrack (DJ Dione Remix) - 2:14
12. Evil Activities & DJ Panic - Never Fall Asleep (feat. MC Alee) - 4:54
13. Jappo & Lancinhouse - Exlxaxl (Neophyte & Evil Activities Remix) - 2:59
14. Ophidian & Tapage - The Mine - 3:41
15. Hardcore United - Time to Make a Stand (Neophyte & Evil Activities Mix) - 4:40
16. Evil Activities - Back On Track (feat. DJ Neophyte) - 3:43
17. Neophyte vs Evil Activities - One of These Days - 3:41
18. Neophyte vs Lenny Dee - The Future Priests of Now - 5:13

Disc 4: Dougal & Gammer

1. Dougal & Gammer - Tell Me a Story (feat. Lisa Marie) - 4:37
2. Dougal & Gammer - Rock the Dancefloor - 3:42
3. Gammer & G Spencer - Reflections - 3:03
4. Scott Brown - Detonated 2005 Remix - 2:44
5. Dougal & Gammer - Open Ur Eyes (feat. Lisa Marie) - 4:42
6. Ultravibes - Dopest DJ - 2:00
7. Adam Harris - My Star (Brisk & Vagabond Remix) - 2:06
8. Dougal & Gammer - The Underground - 3:35
9. Jenna - All the Tears I've Cried - 4:23
10. Ultravibes - Accorbation - 1:49
11. DJ Seduction - Rock That Body - 2:41
12. CLSM - Sensory Vision Part 2 (feat. Ant Johnson) - 3:07
13. Darren Styles - Dropzone (Bonkers Mix) - 4:15
14. Gammer - A New Feeling - 2:06
15. Eclipse - Things You Do (Gammer Remix) - 3:17
16. Gammer - Now It's My Turn - 3:31
17. Cube::Hard - Show Me a Sign (feat. Jennifer Bolton) - 2:22
18. Dougal & Gammer - Tripod - 2:54
19. CLSM - Heey - 2:24
20. Oli G - Gir (Arkitech Remix) - 3:58
21. Gammer - Let's All Say Fuck - 2:13

== Bonkers 16: Maximum Hardcore Energy! ==
Bonkers 16: Maximum Hardcore Energy!

Compilation album
- Released: 10 Jul 2006
- Genres: UK hard house, hardcore techno, gabber
- Length: 3:43:13
- Label: Resist Music

chronology
| Bonkers 15: Legends of the Core | Bonkers 16: Maximum Hardcore Energy! | Best of Bonkers |

Disc 1: Hixxy & Re-Con

1. D-Code featuring Emma - My Direction (Squad-E Remix) - 6:04
2. Hixxy & Re-Con - I Can Wait - 5:14
3. CLSM - Free Your Mind (Darren Styles Remix) - 5:40
4. Re-Con - Report To The Bass Line - 4:31
5. DJ Robbo (Geos) - Raise Ya Hands (Sy & Unknown Remix) - 4:08
6. Technikore - WTF (Dub Mix) - 4:19
7. Statik - Got A Feeling (Darren Styles Remix) - 3:34
8. Clear Vu - Close To You (Re-Con Remix) - 4:31
9. Whizzkid, Flyin' & Sparky - Rave Phenomenon - 4:08
10. Footprintz - Angels (Sy & Unknown Remix) - 5:16
11. Vince Nysse & N J Hinton - Silver Water (Darren Styles Remix) - 3:59
12. Squad-E - Lost (Squad-E Vs D-Code) - 5:30
13. Hixxy & Euphony featuring Donna Marie - Night Life - 4:29
14. Hixxy & Re-Con - Devastated Motivated - 4:21
15. Breeze & Re-Con - Only If I Had More - 3:32

Disc 2: Sharkey & CLSM feat Kutski

1. Hellix - U R Everything (Cube::Hard Remix) - 4:17
2. Sharkey, Arkitech & Susi Ankah - Dual Illumination - 4:21
3. Darwin featuring Justin - SOS (Save Our Souls) - 3:38
4. Cortez & York - Give It All (Max Factor Remix) - 4:00
5. DJ Entity - Spice - 5:50
6. D - D3A (Cube::Hard Remix) - 2:11
7. Ponder & Wizbit - New Zealand Story (CLSM Remix) - 2:49
8. Cube::Hard - Music Of The Primes - 3:27
9. DJ Wink - Over Me - 4:00
10. Sharkey & A.M.S - Motion Maker - 4:45
11. Ethos & A.M.S - Nose Bleed (Ethos & Stormtrooper Remix) - 3:16
12. Marc Smith & Arkitech - Rock N Roll - 3:19
13. Ethos - Music (Kevin Energy Remix) - 3:55
14. Nu Foundation - In Kontrol - 1:16
15. Arkitech - Tranzport - 3:11
16. Cube::Hard - Dark and Light (Setting Sun) - 3:16
17. Rampant Gammer - Enigma - 3:33
18. Human Resource - Dominator (Brisk & Ham Remix) - 4:21
19. CLSM featuring MC Sharkey & Kadi - Hit The Beat - 1:59
20. CLSM - Drive Away (Faster Mix) - 4:52
21. Marc Smith & Gammer - One With The Beat - 3:33
22. Sharkey - Bang Like A Mother - 3:49

Disc 3: Scott Brown & Gammer

1. Cube::Hard - Micro N2 - 5:55
2. Scott Brown - Invite The Violence - 2:57
3. Adam Harris - Hyperspeed (Sy & Unknown Remix) - 3:04
4. Sy & Unknown featuring Lou Lou - Caught Up In Your Love (Scott Brown Remix) - 4:33
5. Eclipse - 24/7 (Squad-E Mix) - 3:55
6. Scott Brown - What You Gonna Do - 3:14
7. Whizzkid Vs United In Dance - Don't Want This Night To End - 3:14
8. Scott Brown - Lost Generation (Nu Foundation Mix) - 3:14
9. Dougal and Gammer - This Is A Virus - 3:36
10. Scott Brown - Wakey Wakey - 3:14
11. Scott Brown - This Is How We Do It (Gammer's Muffin Mix) - 5:03
12. Scott Brown - Go Bezerk - 1:37
13. Gammer - Body Flow - 2:53
14. Ewigkeit - It's Not Reality (Scott Brown Mix) - 2:30
15. Stormtrooper & Devastate - Battle Of The Mind - 3:14
16. A.M.S - Rock The Jam (Hardcore Mix) - 2:34
17. Scott Brown - How Many Sukka's - 2:53
18. DJ Kurt - Ruff Ride Provider - 2:47
19. Scott Brown - Sonic Boomstick - 2:31
20. DJ Nosferatu - Knock Out - 3:36
21. Art Of Fighters Vs Nico & Tetta - Shotgun (Aof Reloaded) - 2:41
22. The A.M.D.A - Fuck The Rails - 4:32

== Best of Bonkers ==
Best of Bonkers

Compilation album
- Released: 15 Jan 2007
- Genres: UK hard house, hardcore techno, gabber
- Length: 3:38:09
- Label: Resist Music

chronology
| Bonkers 16: Maximum Hardcore Energy! | Best of Bonkers | Bonkers 17: Re-Booted |

Disc 1: Hixxy & Re-Con

1. Ikon - Give Yourself To Me (Fade and Bananaman Remix) - 4:50
2. J.D.S. - Higher Love (Slipmatt Remix) - 4:05
3. Hixxy and Sunset - People Party (remix) - 4:50
4. Force and Styles - Harmony - 4:16
5. Vampire - Techno Storm (Sharkey Remix) - 3:42
6. Force and Styles - Wonderland - 4:02
7. E-Logic and DNA - Kick Your Legs In The Air - 4:24
8. O.M.G. - The One - 4:13
9. Triple J - Have It All (Pan Mix) - 5:35
10. Antisocial - 24-7 - 4:00
11. DJ Paul Elstak - Don't Leave Me Alone (Hardcore Mix) - 3:51
12. Critical Mass - Burnin Love (DJ Weirdo and DJ Sim 173.683 Remix) - 4:28
13. Antisocial - Forever Young - 4:55
14. Wedlock - Ganjaman - 3:25
15. Lockjaw - Deep In The Underground - 3:03
16. Phoenix - Now Who's In Control - 3:25
17. Diss Reaction - Jiiieehaaaa - 3:04
18. Lockjaw - Reactor - 3:02
19. Nosferatu - The Future - 2:44
20. Wedlock - I'm The Fuck You Man - 3:34

Disc 2: Sharkey & Druid

1. Hixxy and Sharkey - Toytown (Exclusive Intro Mix) - 2:53
2. Seb - Rainbow Islands (Sharkey Remix) - 1:28
3. Druid and Sharkey - Bonkers Anthem - 3:14
4. Helix and Tekno Dred - U R Everything Feat Marlon and Becks - 3:05
5. Druid and Kevin Energy - Future Dimensions - 1:59
6. Brisk and Trixxy - Back To The Top - 2:32
7. Bang The Future - Body Slam - 1:48
8. Sharkey - Revolutions Pt.2 (Slipmatt Remix) - 1:48
9. DJ Slam - Influence (Exclusive Bonkers Remix) - 2:53
10. DJ Fury - Lemonade Raygun - 2:42
11. Kevin Energy - Vertigo - 2:40
12. DJ Fury - De Sensitize 98 - 2:21
13. Kevin Energy - Waves Of Desire - 3:44
14. Sharkey - The Awakening - 3:55
15. K Complex - Adagio - 3:29
16. DJ Kaos - Can You Feel It (Acid and Bass VIP Mix) - 4:18
17. Ethos and Kaos Ft Mc Sharkey - Get Fucked - 3:46
18. CLSM - John Peel (Its Not Enough) - 3:06
19. Kaos and Ethos - Technorocker - 4:31
20. CLSM and Sharkey - Wicked MC - 4:10
21. Marc Smith - Boom 'n' Pow (Exclusive Marc Smith Bonkers Remix) - 4:15
22. Alas Smith and Sharkey - Oh No! - 1:46
23. Helix - Now Control - 4:26
24. Sharkey - Product Of Society - 5:25
25. DJ Eclipse - Ultraworld 5 - 2:59

Disc 3: Scott Brown

1. Scott Brown and Hyperbass - We're Droppin This (Plus System Remix) - 3:44
2. Plus System - Make You Freak - 3:06
3. Plus System - Prince of Darkness - 2:00
4. Scott Brown - Turn Up The Music (Breeze and Styles Remix) - 2:35
5. Plus System - Commence - 2:00
6. Scott Brown - Wakey Wakey - 2:33
7. Plus System - Neckbreaker - 2:11
8. SY and Unknown - Bring Me Round To Love (Scott Brown Evolution Remix) - 2:33
9. Scott Brown - Rock You Softly - 3:39
10. Scott Brown feat Cat Knight - All About You - 2:00
11. Scott Brown - Taking Drugs? - 2:33
12. Plus System - This Is How We Do It - 3:16
13. Scott Brown - Elysium Plus - 2:33
14. Brisk and Ham - Angel Eyes - 3:49
15. Tommyknocker - Twist - 3:05
16. Art Of Fighters - Earthquake - 3:44
17. Scott Brown - Ghosts - 2:49
18. Hard Creation - Bastard / Asshole - 2:53
19. The Viper and Tommyknocker - The Prophecy Unfolds (Tha Playah Remix) - 3:59
20. Scott Brown - Boomstick - 3:54

== Bonkers 17: Re-Booted ==
Bonkers 17: Re-Booted

Compilation album
- Released: 29 Oct 2007
- Genres: UK hard house, hardcore techno, gabber
- Label: Resist Music

chronology
| Best of Bonkers | Bonkers 17: Re-Booted | Bonkers: The Original Hardcore |

Disc 1: Brisk & Ham Mix

1. Brisk & Vagabond Vs Uraken - Tokyo Rush
2. Brisk & Vagabond Vs MC Wotsee - The Last Word
3. Ham & DMO - Every Single Day
4. Uplift, Sc@r & Vicky Fee - One
5. DJ Stormtrooper feat. MC Knight - Hardcore Raver
6. Druid & Stormtrooper feat. Kristy - Electrified
7. Brisk & Vagabond ft. Lisa Marie - Free
8. Ham & DMO - In Your Eyes
9. Fracus - Snowstorm
10. Ham & DMO - This Emotion
11. Sharkey - My Everything (Ham Remix)
12. Euphoria ft MC Wotsee & Tess - Final Goodbye
13. Drew Derivative - Rock Da Groove
14. Fracus ft. Ali - Your Guiding Light
15. Scott Brown - Roll The Track (Gammer Remix)
16. Eclipse - Hearts Desire (Brisk & Vagabond Remix)
17. Brisk & Vagabond - Lift Me Up
18. Joey Riot Vs Davey Forbes - Rock The Dancefloor
19. Ham ft. MC Casper - Detonate This Sound
20. DJ Kurt - World Domination
21. Brisk & Ham - Step 2 Da Flaw (Bonkers VIP Mix)
22. Brisk & Vagabond - Night & Days (Joey Riot 2007 Remix)
23. Brisk & Vagabond - Mental Mission
24. Nerve Centre - Get Busier
25. Darwin & Obie vs Mr E - Hits you like Thunder
26. Thian Brodie - Beat Master
27. The Wishmaster - Pump Up The Pressure
28. Bodylotion - Neighbourhood Crime (Tha Playah Remix)

Disc 2: Sharkey & Kevin Energy Mix

1. Sharkey - Today's The Day
2. K90 - Red Snapper (K Complex v's ADT Remix)
3. Darwin - Peak 1.1
4. Sharkey - My Everything
5. Kevin Energy - Tribal Resistance (Rave Mix)
6. Firefly - Dimensions
7. Alek Szahala - Alanarama (Arkitech Remix)
8. Lost Soul - Taking Over Me
9. Infinite Dimensions feat. Ephexis - Krater
10. Darwin & Entity - The End of time
11. Vibes Vs Splash - Techno Wonderland 2007
12. Mister Stewart & Barry Diston - 7 Colours
13. Sharkey ft. Lisa Abbott - Bonkers Anthem
14. Arkitech & Double Decka - I May Be Dreaming
15. MDA and Spherical Vs DJ GRH - Illusion (Splash Remix)
16. Darwin - Coral Beach
17. Nick Xero, Arkitech & Douglas - Hardcore Junkie
18. Robbie Long & Stormtrooper - Acid Man
19. Freeza - Virtual Darkness
20. S3RL - Weekend
21. Ham - Bass Kiks
22. Arkitech - De Humanise 2007
23. Robbie Long Feat Ethos - Wakey Wakey (AMS Remix)
24. Darwin & Obie - Futureshock
25. Sharkey and Arkitech - Quadraphinix

Disc 3: Scott Brown & Marc Smith Mix

1. Scott Brown - Enlightened (DJ Weaver Remix)
2. Fracus - I Can't Stand It
3. Sean Apollo & DMO - I Can Feel You Now
4. Fonzarelli - Moonlight Party (Kurt Remix)
5. Scott Brown & Kelly C - Hold You In My Arms
6. Robbie Long & Stormtrooper - Nasty Time
7. Scott Brown - Do It Like We Do (Al Storm Mix)
8. Al Storm, Mike Euphony & Donna Marie - Runaway (Exclusive Bonkers Mix)
9. Darwin vs Rampant feat Ant Johnson - No More
10. Darwin - Floor Damage
11. DJ Weaver & DMO - Paradise
12. Scott Brown & DMO - Fall Into Your Arms
13. Joey Riot - Party Alarm
14. Frisky Hujib - Get Away (Gammer Remix)
15. Weaver & Andy L Feat. Fran - Cannonball (Scott Brown Remix)
16. Scott Brown - Livewired
17. DJ Marc Smith & Gammer - You Can Dance
18. DJ Marc Smith - Let It Hit Em
19. Brisk & Vagabond - Environmental Product
20. Men of steel - The Future Is Ours (Panic & Tha Playah Remix)
21. Hard Creation - I will have that power (The Stunned Guys Remix)

== Bonkers: The Original Hardcore ==
Bonkers: The Original Hardcore

Compilation album
- Released: 11 May 2009
- Genres: UK hard house, hardcore techno, gabber
- Labels: Universal Music TV, All Around The World

chronology
| Bonkers 17: Re-Booted | Bonkers: The Original Hardcore |

Disc 1 - Mixed by DJ Sharkey

1. Darwin Feat Fraz - We're Getting Faster
2. Arkitech - When Tears Fall - Kaotik
3. Ham - Jump 2 Da Groove 2009
4. Sharkey, Odyssey & Arkitech - Black Rain
5. Baby D - Let Me Be Your Fantasy (Darwin's 'Arena Space 5' Remix)
6. Sharkey & Clsm - Wikkid M.C (2009 Exclusive)
7. Slippery Disco - Feeling High (Kevin Energy Remix)
8. Brisk & Ham - Dance Don't Slip
9. Sharkey - Never Say Die (Kevin Energy Remix)
10. Sharkey - Today's The Day (Darwin Remix)
11. Marc Smith & Gammer - Building Shaker (V.I.P Rmx)
12. Al Storm - Jumpin
13. S3rl - Here We Go
14. Scooter - Jumping All Over The World (Sharkey & K-Complex Rmx)
15. Scooter - Posse (I Need You On The Floor) (Weaver Rmx)
16. Porn Kings V Dj Supreme - Up To Da Wildstyle (Gammer & Andy Whitby Remix)
17. S3rl - Dealer (V.I.P Remix)
18. Marc Smith & Darwin - Let The Bass Kick
19. Kevin Energy - Freeform Will Never Die

Disc 2 - Mixed by Chris Unknown

1. Lmc V U2 - Take Me To The Clouds Above
2. Styles & Breeze - Amigos
3. Rampant Djs Featuring Jt - Alabama (Sy & Unknown Remix)
4. Insight Featuring Emily Reed - Heaven Help Me Now
5. Topvibe Vs Dj Sy - Pacman
6. Chris Unknown & Re-Con - Welcome To The Trip
7. Sy & Unknown - If You Believe
8. Chris Unknown - Wanna Be Here With You
9. Chris Unknown Featuring Grant Paterson - Come Together
10. Dougal & Gammer - Guitar Hero
11. Flip & Fill - Discoland
12. Scott Brown - Pilgrim
13. Phaze4 - You're Never Gonna Know (Scott Brown Remix)
14. Sy & Unknown - Hardcore
15. E-Type - Rain
16. Emily Reed - Your Love Is Shining
17. Stykal Brix Vs Mc Storm - Cold As Ice
18. Sy & Unknown Featuring Grant Paterson - Bring You Down

Disc 3 - Mixed by Hixxy

1. Bo - Judgement Day
2. Hixxy - R U Ready
3. Darren Styles Feat Lisa Abbott - Getting Better
4. United In Dance Feat Lisa Marie - Still The One
5. Clear Vu - I Adore
6. Hixxy - C.O.N
7. Clsm - Free Your Mind
8. Hixxy & Styles - Elevator
9. Clear Vu - Close To You
10. Re-Con - Report To The Bassline
11. Clsm & Cube::Hard - See You On The Other Side
12. Hixxy & Squad-E - Beat Drop
13. Squad-E - Lost Without You
14. Gammer - Body Flow
15. Styles & Breeze - Electric
16. Styles & Breeze - You're My Angel
17. Hixxy & Styles - The Theme

== See also ==
- Clubland X-Treme Hardcore (compilation series)
- Reactivate compilation series
