= Dowster =

- Also known as: Dowster, DJ Dowster
- Born: David Thomas; 1 March 1971 (age 55); Cwmbran, Wales
- Genres: UK Hardcore, happy hardcore, gabba
- Occupations: Record producer, singer songwriter, disc jockey
- Years active: 2005–present
- Labels: Raver Baby, Candy Crush Music, Acid Kandee
- Website: candycrushmusic.com

Dowster or DJ Dowster, also known as David Thomas, (born 1 March 1971 in Newport, South Wales), is a Welsh record producer, singer-songwriter and disc jockey from Cwmbran in South Wales. David has been involved in the rave scene since 1998. Dowster was signed to Raver Baby Records by its owner DJ Hixxy (born Ian Hicks) to become part of the original Raver Baby Collective. This collective, known at the time as the RBC, included some of the UK Hardcore scene's leading DJs and MCs. In addition to his DJ bookings and single releases within this period, Dowster's solo and collaborative studio projects can be found on certain volumes of the Bonkers series as well as other leading names in UK hardcore compilation albums.

== Candy Crush Music ==
In 2008, Dowster founded the UK Hardcore label Candy Crush Music with Alex Bassjunkie, through which a series of collaborations between these two artists were released. In 2011, full ownership of the label was signed over to Dowster. The relaunch of Candy Crush Music was in June 2011. Dowster signed Vagabond (born Sam Thomsitt, previously known as "V.A.G.A.B.O.N.D.", "Euphoria" and "Dreadhed" from his previous work with Next Generation Records and Blatant Beats) to Candy Crush Music in March 2011. Other established artists with whom Dowster has collaborated for the relaunched Candy Crush Music label include Cat Knight, Mark Breeze, MC Whizzkid, MC Wotsee and MC Enemy.
