= Toy Town =

1995 single by DJ Hixxy and MC Sharkey

- Single cover

Single by Hixxy and Sharkey
- Released: 1995
- Genre: Happy hardcore
- Length: 4:46 (original version); 5:02 (vocal remix); 3:25 (radio mix); 4:42 (1996 mix)
- Label: Essential Platinum
- Songwriters: Ian Hicks, Jonathan Kneath
- Producers: Ian Hicks, Jonathan Kneath

Music video
- "Toy Town ('Noddy & Bigears' Mix)" on YouTube
- "Toy Town ('In Ya Face' Mix)" on YouTube

"Toy Town" is a happy hardcore track by British duo Hixxy and Sharkey. Released in 1995, the single was a hit in the UK clubbing scene, peaked at number 24 in the UK dance singles chart, and had a pivotal impact in the UK rave music scene with a move away from breakbeat towards the newer happy hardcore "cheesy" sound.

== History ==
The track, written and produced by Hixxy and Sharkey, was inspired by the earlier "toytown techno" phase characterised by tracks such as "Charly" by the Prodigy. It starts with a chopped amen break, and goes on to feature "sugar sweet" vocals, a "bouncy kick" and an "ultra-cheesy stab pattern". It has elements of hip hop, house, gabba and techno. Playing at the high tempo characteristic of the "speedrush" of the genre, by the end of the track it has been described as going towards "unstoppable mania".

In 1994, it became a club "anthem", and following release on the Essential Platinum label in 1995 it peaked at number 24 in the UK Dance Singles official chart and sold c. 5,000 copies. The reception of the track was divided, with both support and detraction. MC Magika stated it "was a fork in the road" that "almost destroyed the scene in its current form". On the one hand it was considered a "breath of fresh air" due to the lack of breakbeats, that appealed to a newer generation, but on the other many found the sound to be "cheesy". The "juvenile" hardcore sound, being high tempo with pitched vocals and catchy choruses and samples, had been expected to herald the "death of rave" but the success of the track was cited as opposing evidence.

The "cult" success of the track led to interest from the React record label. As a result, Hixxy and Sharkey were signed to the label to create the Bonkers hardcore compilation series, which went on to have at least 19 releases from 1996 to 2009, achieving both chart and sales success even if not attaining the critical cachet of "cooler" sounds. "Toy Town" was the first track on the first compilation.

In a 2011 retrospective article BBC Radio 1 DJ Kutski stated that the track is a "classic" and "the definition of the UK hardcore sound".

== Track listing ==
- "Toy Town" ('Noddy & Bigears' Mix) - (6:13)
- "Toy Town" ('In Ya Face' Mix) - (5:16)
- "Toy Town" (Bass-D, F. Noize and Potato Remix) - (3:23)

== Charts ==
"Toy Town" charting
Chart	Year	Peak position
UK Dance Singles	1995	24
