= Clubland (brand) =

UK dance album and events brand

- Type: Private
- Industry: Dance compilation albums, radio / television
- Genre: Dance, house, trance, Eurodance
- Founded: 2002, United Kingdom
- Founder: Matt Cadman
- Headquarters: United Kingdom, Blackburn, Lancashire
- Products: Clubland 1 – Clubland 2017
- Services: Online, TV, compilation
- Owner: All Around the World

Clubland is a brand created by the UK dance record labels All Around the World and Universal Music TV. Since 2002, Clubland has made many dance compilation albums, including the popular Clubland series, which ended with the album Clubland 2017, released on 4 November 2016. Clubland also hosts live events in various nightclubs and clubland Ibiza, and in 2008 many Clubland artists featured on the Clubland Night of Your Life arena tour. In January 2008, Clubland launched its own digital TV channel, Clubland TV.

Since 2019, Clubland has stopped releasing new compilation albums, instead focusing on events that tour the United Kingdom, and Clubland TV continues to be run by Universal Music TV, playing mostly throwback dance from the early 1990s to the late 2010s.

== Website ==
The Clubland website, www.clubland.fm, featured various content such as music, videos, mixes, downloads, games, live chat, and so much more. The website provided access to all the latest information about albums, upcoming events, live performances and more. It also contained a Clubland shop in which various official Clubland merchandise such as t-shirts were available for purchase. The Clubland website was taken offline several years ago. the 'All Around the World' website (www.aatw.com) previously took over providing the latest information about Clubland releases and events. The AATW website currently displays no content and it is unknown why. Clubland's Facebook page is currently the most reliable source of Clubland news, including new music releases, upcoming live performances and more. The page is verified official.

== Radio show podcasts ==
Since October 2006, each month there had been a podcast released by Clubland, available for listeners to download from their website or iTunes. Dave Bethell presented the podcast, which was usually about 30 minutes long, in the same style as a radio show and the podcast was also used mainly to air exclusive new Clubland tracks and advertise forthcoming Clubland releases and events. The podcasts are now unavailable.

== Clubland TV ==
In January 2008, Clubland launched its own TV channel on Sky channel 383. The channel airs the latest Clubland music videos as well as Clubland classics. In the future, the channel will show live events and interviews from Clubland as well as competitions and prizes. The channel is now on Virgin TV channel 292 and Freeview channel 69.

== Live events ==
Clubland often held live events across various nightclubs in the UK, Ireland and across Europe. Flip & Fill, Ultrabeat and Micky Modelle usually toured nightclubs with MC Keyes and sometimes a live PA act. Launch parties were held around the time of a new Clubland or Clubland X-Treme Hardcore release, with live performances by Clubland artists, such as Flip & Fill and Ultrabeat, and these were used to help promote the release and filming for the album trailers.

On their website, Clubland usually promoted the weekend events of some of their favorite venues and some of the hardcore events taking place, as well as promoting the live performances of some of their artists. Clubland also promoted Cascada's UK tour with Ultrabeat in September to October 2007.

== Clubland Live tours ==
In March 2008, Clubland held Clubland Live, an arena tour across seven arenas in the UK. Cascada and Scooter headlined the tour and some of the acts that appeared on the tour were Ultrabeat, Flip & Fill, Kelly Llorenna and Karen Parry.

A second tour followed in November and December 2008, this time with Scooter headlining and acts including September, Kate Ryan, Darren Styles, Ultrabeat, Flip & Fill and Karen Parry.

In July 2009, Clubland's website revealed the dates for Clubland Live 3 with Cascada headlining the show. Other performers included Agnes Carlsson (a.k.a. Agnes), N-Dubz, Darren Styles, Ultrabeat and Flip & Fill. The shows started on 26 November at the Glasgow SECC Arena and ended on 6 December at the National Indoor Arena, Birmingham.

The Clubland Live 4 tour was scheduled to take place in October 2010 at various locations across the country, headlined by Scooter and other acts including Tinchy Stryder, Alex K, Ultrabeat, Flip & Fill and ItaloBrothers. The entire tour was cancelled on 6 October 2010 due to "unforeseen circumstances", after an announcement on the official Clubland website. No further information was given.

== Notable performers ==
- Alex K
- Alice Deejay
- Avicii
- Basshunter
- Breeze
- Cascada
- Darren Styles
- Dougal
- DJ Sammy
- Eyeopener
- Flip & Fill
- Gammer
- Gigi d'Agostino
- Groove Coverage
- Hixxy
- ItaloBrothers
- K-Klass
- Kate Ryan
- Karen Parry
- Kelly Llorenna
- Lasgo
- Liz Kay
- LMC
- Masters at Work
- Manian
- Mickey Modelle
- Milk Inc.
- N-Dubz
- N-Force
- N-Trance
- Sash!
- Scooter
- Skyla
- Slinkee Minx
- Special D
- Sunblock
- Therese
- Tiësto
- Ultrabeat

== Compilation albums ==
=== Floorfillers series ===
- Floorfillers
- Floorfillers 2
- Floorfillers 3
- Floorfillers 4
- Floorfillers Club Classics
- Floorfillers Anthems
- Floorfillers 08
- Floorfillers Clubmix
- Floorfillers 80's Club Classics
- Floorfillers 2010
- Monster Floorfillers
- Floorfillers 2011
- Floorfillers Party Mix
- Ultimate Floorfillers
- Floorfillers Old Skool
- Floorfillers Club Anthems

=== Dance Mania series ===
- Dance Mania
- Dance Mania 2
- Dance Mania Party (CD/DVD) – released 8 December 2008

=== Ultimate NRG series (mixed by Alex K) ===
- Ultimate NRG
- Ultimate NRG 2
- Ultimate NRG 3
- Ultimate NRG 4
- Ultimate NRG Megamix
- Ultimate NRG 5

=== Clubmix series ===
- Clubmix 2003
- Clubmix 2004
- Clubmix 2005
- Clubmix 2006
- Clubmix 2007
- Clubmix Classics

=== Others ===
- Anthem – Classics from Clubland
- Funky House '06
- Club 2K7
- Dancemix 2008
- Bounce Mania
- Welcome to the Club
- RnB Clubland
- Clubland Classix – The Album of Your Life
- Clubland Classix 2 – The Album of Your Life Is Back
- Clubland Smashed (Mixed by Friday Night Posse & Tuffcub)
- Clubland Smashed 2 (Mixed by Friday Night Posse & Tuffcub)
