= Bang! (band) =

British happy hardcore band

Bang! are a British happy hardcore group from the late 1990s originally consisting of producer Nick Arnold, Tom Orton and female vocalist Donna Grassie. Nick Arnold and Tom Orton had previously been a members of the band Smart E's, who reached 2 in the UK in 1992 with their cover of the theme tune to Sesame Street entitled Sesame's Treat. After the release of "Cloudy Daze" which featured Donna, Tom Orton brought Jo James to the attention of Nick after a contact of Tom's, Jo's husband, presented to him a demo of his wife singing.

After "Cloudy Daze", Tom left Bang! to work with other artists including Jack Speed and Kriminal, and Nick and Jo went on to have enormous success with "Shooting Star", and then a whole catalogue of vocal hardcore anthems almost all of which written entirely by Nick. Their underground bouncy singles were regularly featured on the Bonkers compilation series.

"Shooting Star" was also featured on the first issue of the Dancemania Speed series and later included on the first greatest hits album of the series and the 2003 happyhardcore-focused compilation of the series. Also three remixes of their songs, "Shooting Star (Ham's Mix)", "Break of Dawn (Brisk Mix)", "Cloudy Daze (Original Bang! Mix)", were included on the 2001 happy hardcore compilation album Happy Ravers.

Nick and Jo were so prolific with their output, that they released under a number of different acts including "Stealth", "Oblivvion" and "Blaze!". Finally, in February 2005, with a whole collection of new remixes, Bang! released their debut album, entitled "Shooting Star".

Their single Shooting Star was covered by trance act Flip & Fill in 2002, who took it to number 3 in the UK charts.

Jo James eventually quit the band but worked with the aforementioned Flip & Fill on their 2003 single I Wanna Dance With Somebody; a cover version of the old Whitney Houston track and Field of Dreams.

Bang! continues to release under the Warped Science label owned by DJ Al Storm and Euphony.
