= Karen Parry =

Dance vocalist

Karen Parry is a dance vocalist who featured on a number of European hits in the 2000s.

She featured with Flip & Fill on chart hit "Shooting Star" in 2002, originally recorded by happy hardcore act Bang!, reaching number 3 in the UK.

She featured with Flip & Fill on "Discoland" in 2004, reaching number 11 in the UK. This was originally a happy hardcore track by Tiny Tot. She featured on Pascal's remake of "I Think We're Alone Now", a cover of the 1960s classic by Tommy James & the Shondells (later covered in the 1980s by Tiffany), reaching UK #23 in 2002.

Parry is signed to AATW Records and regularly features on the Clubland album series. She recorded a cover of Irene Cara's "Flashdance" for the Clubland III album (2003). She collaborated with Pascal on "This Will Be (The Best Days Of Our Lives)" which featured on Clubland 4 (2003).

Both "Flashdance" and "This Will Be" were released on promo only with remixes, and in 2007 were available as digital downloads on iTunes under the misspelled artist name 'Karren Parry'.

Other vocal collaborations include the Dance Assassins (DJ Insy & Matt Troll) for a rework of happy hardcore anthem "Here I Am" in 2004, originally recorded by Ham, Demo and Justin Time. This was followed in 2005 by "Sail Away" which was originally recorded by Bang!.

She has since been recording as a solo artist with Flip & Fill (Mark Hall & Graham Turner) as producers, covering "Against All Odds" by Phil Collins in 2006. Her latest track "I'm In Heaven (When You Kiss Me)" (2007) was originally a European chart hit by ATC in 2003.

In 2008 she toured the UK with Flip & Fill on the Clubland Arena Tour with other artists including Scooter, Ultrabeat and Cascada.

Year	Song	Chart position
2002	"Shooting Star" (with Flip & Fill)	UK #3
2002	"I Think We're Alone Now" (with Pascal)	UK #23
2003	"Flashdance"	Clubland III - The Sound Of The Summer
2003	"This Will Be (The Best Days of Our Lives)" (with Pascal)	Promo/12" only
2004	"Discoland" (with Flip & Fill)	UK #11
2004	"Here I Am" (with Dance Assassins)	Promo/12" only
2005	"Sail Away" (with Dance Assassins)	
2006	"Against All Odds"	
2007	"I'm In Heaven (When You Kiss Me)"	
