= DJ Dougal =

British hardcore DJ and producer (born 1975)

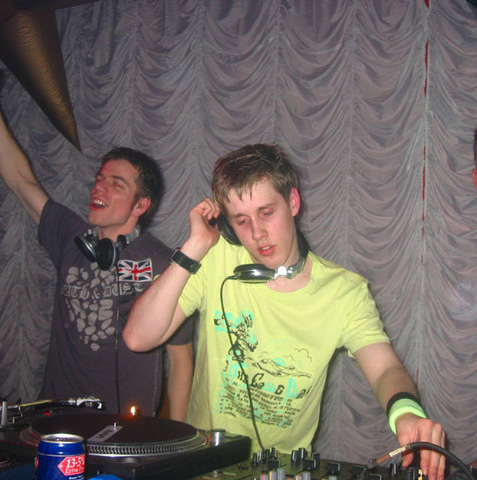
- Dougal (left) and Gammer

Background information
- Also known as: Dr. Who, Paul Clarke
- Born: Paul Arnold Clarke; April 14, 1975 (age 51); Northampton, England, United Kingdom
- Genres: UK happy hardcore
- Occupations: Record producer, DJ
- Instrument: Turntables
- Years active: 1989–present
- Labels: Meltdown, Salamander, Fodder, United Dance Recordings, Die Hard, Impact, Central Station, Essential Platinum, Rave n' Beats Limited, Monstercat

Paul Arnold Clarke (born 14 April 1975), professionally known as DJ Dougal, is a British UK happy hardcore producer and DJ.

== Career ==
Clarke first became involved with the dance music scene at the age of 15, while setting up sound systems for some of the first acid house parties, as part of work experience assignment to a music shop. Through this, he met Murray Beetson (of ESP Promotions and promoter of the Dreamscape raves) and became a resident at raves including Equinox Milwaukees, Dreamscape and Helter Skelter.

His style is a mix of euphoric hardcore with uplifting vocals. He has worked alongside many other hardcore artists including DNA, Gammer and Hixxy, though in recent years, most of his work has been with Gammer. Several years ago, he – along with Hixxy – created the successful label Essential Platinum, which has had many releases. A significant amount of his work has been featured in the popular Bonkers hardcore compilation series, several releases of which he also mixed for.

In 1997 the Bonkers 3 compilation was released, with Clarke providing the mix for CD#3. The album was certified gold in the UK and a special edition of the compilation was released to commemorate it. Five of the Bonkers compilations that have his contribution have gone top 20 on the UK compilations chart.

Clarke appeared on the Dancemania series, including its Speed sub-series such as its first issue where he appeared with three tracks.

As of 2022, Clarke continues to perform live, often with fellow hardcore innovators such as Hixxy at events including the Bang Face Weekender in Southport.

== See also ==
- Hixxy – British DJ and producer (born 1975)
- DJ Sharkey – British musical artist and producer
