= Field of Dreams (song) =

1996 song by Force & Styles

Song by Force & Styles
- Released: 1997
- Recorded: 1996; UK Dance Studios, Clacton-on-Sea
- Genre: Happy hardcore
- Length: 4:59
- Label: UK Dance
- Songwriter: Paul Hobbs, Darren Mew
- Producers: Force & Styles

"Field of Dreams" is a song originally written and recorded by Force & Styles featuring Jenna on vocals. The song was released on white label in 1997 and later appeared on their greatest hits album Heart of Gold (2000). In 2003 the song was covered by Flip & Fill featuring Jo James and reached No. 28 on the UK Singles Chart.

== Force & Styles version ==
The Force & Styles version was a happy hardcore song which features the vocals of Jenna who has collaborated with the duo on several recordings. The song was produced, written and recorded by Force & Styles at their own 'UK Dance Studios', in Clacton-on-Sea, Essex in 1996. The song was pressed as a one-sided white label by UK Dance Records in 1997 and it also later appears on their greatest hits album Heart of Gold (2000).

=== Personnel ===
Force & Styles

- Paul Hobbs – producer
- Darren Mew – producer

Additional musicians

- Jenna – vocals

== Flip & Fill version ==
"Field of Dreams"

Single by Flip & Fill featuring Jo James

from the album Floorfillas
- Released: 28 June 2003
- Recorded: 2003; Hutch Studios, England
- Length: 3:18
- Label: All Around the World
- Songwriter: Paul Hobbs, Darren Mew
- Producer: Flip & Fill

Flip & Fill singles chronology
"Shake Ya Shimmy" (2003)	"Field of Dreams" (2003)	"Irish Blue" (2003)

=== Track listing ===
CD single

1. "Field of Dreams" (radio edit) – 3:18
2. "Field of Dreams" (Voodoo & Serano remix) – 6:53
3. "Field of Dreams" (Q-Tex remix) – 5:50
4. "Field of Dreams" (Usual Suspects radio) – 3:46

12-inch single

1. "Field of Dreams" (Pascal extended) – 6:48
2. "Field of Dreams" (Voodoo & Serano remix) – 6:53
3. "Field of Dreams" (Q-Tex remix) – 5:50

12-inch promo

1. "Field of Dreams" (Flip & Fill remix) – 6:55
2. "Field of Dreams" (Voodoo & Serano remix) – 6:53
3. "Field of Dreams" (Breeze & Styles remix) – 6:57
4. "Field of Dreams" (Q-Tex remix) – 5:50
5. "Field of Dreams" (Usual Suspects remix) – 6:59

=== Personnel ===
Flip & Fill

- Graham Turner – producer
- Mark Hall – producer

Additional personnel

- Jo James – vocals
- Lee Monteverde – mixing
- Ignition – design

=== Chart performance ===
Chart	Peak Position
Irish Singles Chart	39
UK Singles Chart	28
