= Live at the Liquid Room, Tokyo =

Live album by Jeff Mills
- Released: June 20, 1996
- Recorded: October 28, 1995
- Venue: Liquidroom
- Genre: Detroit techno
- Length: 67:04
- Label: React Music Limited, Sony Music Japan

Jeff Mills chronology
Waveform Transmission Vol. 3 (1994)	Live at the Liquid Room, Tokyo (1996)	The Other Day (1997)

Live at the Liquid Room, Tokyo is the first live DJ mix album by American electronic music producer Jeff Mills. It was released on May 20, 1996, by React Music Limited and Sony Music Japan.

== Recording ==
The album was recorded live October 28, 1995, at the Liquidroom venue in Tokyo, Japan. Mills used two turntables and two reel-to-reel tape machines to create the mix, which includes his work interwoven with other songs, such as "Strings of Life".

== Critical reception and charting ==
Professional ratings
Review scores
Source	Rating
AllMusic	5/5 stars
Pitchfork	10/10

Live at the Liquid Room, Tokyo has been met with widespread critical acclaim. In a 10/10 review for Pitchfork, Gabriel Szatan wrote "Liquid Room was a mix of such molten intensity that it warped the idea of what DJing could be. The received wisdom of how to construct a club set—one song after another; build-up, breakdown—was obliterated by this lean, striking man mixing like a Spirograph, executing a blur of hip-hop battle techniques over waves of crushing pressure."

In a 5-star review for AllMusic, Jason Birchmeier wrote "Ostensibly a DJ mix but also a showcase for Mills' production work, the album provides ample evidence of his brilliance over the course of three distinct segments, each comprised of numerous tracks, roughly half of which are Mills' own productions."

In June 1996 the album peaked at #45 in the UK compilation chart published by the Official Charts Company.

In 2025/2026, on the 30th anniversary of the 1995 event, Mills did a world tour of 'Live at the Liquid Rooms', often using vinyl and reel to reel as his Djing format.

== Track listing ==
All tracks are written by Jeff Mills, except where otherwise noted.

No.	Title	Writer(s)	Length
1.	"Utopia"		1:09
2.	"The Extremist"		1:40
3.	"Magneze"		1:47
4.	"They Start It Up"	Joey Beltram	1:26
5.	"Step to Enchantment (Stringent)"	Millsart	1:42
6.	"Life Cycle"		2:19
7.	"Untitled A"		1:04
8.	"Work That Body"	Charles Chambers Singers, DJ Funk	1:07
9.	"Run"	Charles Chambers Singers, DJ Funk	2:55
10.	"Play With the Voice in USA"	Marco Dalle Luchem, Csilla, Joe.T Vannelli	1:08
11.	"Clementine"	Hoschi, Wiked Wipe	2:07
12.	"i9"		2:25
13.	"Changes of Life"		2:39
14.	"Overkill"	Circuit Breaker	1:21
15.	"Eternal Sun"	IO	1:25
16.	"Game Form"	Joey Beltram	1:00
17.	"Club MCM"	Kaay Alexi Shelby, Club MCM	1:56
18.	"AX-009"		1:18
19.	"Move"	Surgeon	1:59
20.	"Wet Floor"	Traxmen	0:40
21.	"Detached"		1:13
22.	"Nocrurnal"	Claude Young	0:55
23.	"Bad Boy"	The Advent	3:11
24.	"The 187 Skillz"	DJ Skull	1:27
25.	"Strings of Life"	Rhythim Is Rhythim	3:24
26.	"Loop 3"		0:55
27.	"Untitled B"		2:00
28.	"Extra"	Ken Ishii	1:51
29.	"Avion"	Damon Wild	3:11
30.	"Intro (X-120)"	X-102, Robert Hood	1:22
31.	"Growth"		1:11
32.	"Suspense"	H & M	0:34
33.	"The Other Side"	Shadow	0:47
34.	"Flowerchild"	Dan Morgan	1:09
35.	"Bazetoya"	DJ Hell	2:53
36.	"Casa"		3:57
37.	"Life Cycle"		1:27
38.	"Step to Enchantment (Stringent)"		2:30
Total length:			01:07:04
