= True Love Never Dies =

2001 single by Flip & Fill

- 2002 re-release artwork

Single by Flip & Fill featuring Kelly Llorenna
- B-side: "Depth Charge"
- Released: 12 March 2001
- Studio: The Hutch (UK)
- Genre: Hi-NRG; trance
- Length: 3:28 (radio edit)
- Label: All Around the World
- Songwriters: Jim Dyke; Margee Forman
- Producers: Flip & Fill

Flip & Fill singles chronology
"True Love Never Dies" (2001, 2002)	"Shooting Star" (2002)

Kelly Llorenna singles chronology
"One Day I'll Fly Away" (1996)	"True Love Never Dies" (2001)	"Set You Free" (2001)

Audio
- "True Love Never Dies" on YouTube

"True Love Never Dies" is a song by English electronic music duo Flip & Fill, released as their first single as lead artists. Written by Jim Dyke and Margee Forman, the track is a mashup of "Airwave" by Dutch trance music group Rank 1 and "True Love Never Dies" by American singer Donna Williams. Flip & Fill's version features vocals from English singer Kelly Llorenna and was produced by the duo.

"True Love Never Dies" was originally released in March 2001 but did not experience chart success until a re-release early the following year, when it peaked at number seven on the UK Singles Chart, number 36 in Ireland, and number 83 in Australia. The song was later included on Flip & Fill's only studio album, Floorfillas, released in 2003.

== Release and reception ==
"True Love Never Dies" was first released on 12 March 2001 in the United Kingdom. Six days later, it debuted at number 34 on the UK Singles Chart, with most of its sales coming from Scotland. The song spent three weeks on the chart before dropping out. After being ranked as one of the most underrated singles of 2001, the song was re-released in the United Kingdom in January 2002, reaching its peak of number seven on the UK chart for two weeks and spending 11 more weeks in the top 100, becoming Flip & Fill's first of two top-10 hits. On the Scottish Singles Chart, the single reached number two for three consecutive weeks in February 2002. At the end of 2002, "True Love Never Dies" was placed at number 99 on the UK year-end chart, and in February 2023, the British Phonographic Industry (BPI) awarded the song a silver certification for sales and streaming figures exceeding 200,000 units.

The song also charted in Ireland and Australia following its re-release. In Ireland, the song debuted at its peak of number 36 on the chart dated 31 January 2002. It spent four more weeks in the Irish Singles Chart top 50. With its combined British and Irish sales, the song peaked at number 44 on the Eurochart Hot 100 on 16 February 2002. On 27 May 2002, the single was released in Australia. After debuting at number 83 on the country's ARIA Singles Chart the following week, it dropped out of the top 100 on 10 June. On the ARIA Dance Chart, "True Love Never Dies" peaked at number 11 and remained in the top 25 for two weeks.

== Track listings ==
UK CD single (2001)

1. "True Love Never Dies" (radio edit)
2. "True Love Never Dies" (main mix)
3. "Depth Charge"

UK 12-inch single (2001)

A1. "True Love Never Dies" (main mix)
B1. "True Love Never Dies" (Lockout's Infinity remix)
B2. "Depth Charge"

UK CD1 (2002)

1. "True Love Never Dies" (radio edit)
2. "True Love Never Dies" (Rob Searle remix)
3. "True Love Never Dies" (Kenny Hayes remix)
4. "True Love Never Dies" (original mix)

UK CD2 (2002)

1. "True Love Never Dies" (radio edit)
2. "True Love Never Dies" (Pascal remix)
3. "Shooting Star"
4. "True Love Never Dies" (video)

UK 12-inch single (2002)

A1. "True Love Never Dies" (original mix)
A2. "True Love Never Dies" (Kenny Hayes remix)
B1. "True Love Never Dies" (Rob Searle mix)

German 12-inch single (2002)

A1. "True Love Never Dies" (original mix) – 6:37
A2. "True Love Never Dies" (Pascal remix) – 6:12
B1. "True Love Never Dies" (Rob Searle remix) – 8:49
B2. "True Love Never Dies" (Kenny Hayes remix) – 4:58

Australian CD single (2002)

1. "True Love Never Dies" (radio edit) – 3:28
2. "True Love Never Dies" (Rob Searle radio edit) – 3:47
3. "True Love Never Dies" (Kenny Hayes remix) – 4:57
4. "True Love Never Dies" (original mix) – 6:36
5. "True Love Never Dies" (Pascal remix) – 6:12
6. "True Love Never Dies" (Purge remix) – 8:25
7. "True Love Never Dies" (Rob Searle remix) – 8:49

== Credits and personnel ==
Credits are lifted from the UK 2002 CD1 liner notes.

Studio

- Recorded at The Hutch Studio (UK)

Personnel

- Jim Dyke – writing
- Margee Forman – writing
- Kelly Llorenna – vocals
- Flip & Fill – production
- Lee Monteverde – mixing

== Charts ==
=== Weekly charts ===
Chart (2001)	Peak position
Scotland Singles (OCC)	26
UK Singles (OCC)	34
UK Dance (OCC)	35

Chart (2002)	Peak position
Australia (ARIA)	83
Australian Dance (ARIA)	11
Europe (Eurochart Hot 100)	44
Ireland (IRMA)	36
Scotland Singles (OCC)	2
UK Singles (OCC)	7
UK Dance (OCC)	9

=== Year-end charts ===
Chart (2002)	Position
UK Singles (OCC)	99

== Certifications ==
Region	Certification	Certified units/sales
United Kingdom (BPI)	Silver	200,000^{‡}
^{‡} Sales+streaming figures based on certification alone.

== Release history ==
Region	Date	Format(s)	Label(s)	Ref.
United Kingdom	12 March 2001	12-inch vinyl; CD; cassette	All Around the World	
United Kingdom (re-release)	January 2002	12-inch vinyl; CD	All Around the World	
Australia	27 May 2002	CD	Universal Dance	
