= Shooting Star (Bang! song) =

1998 single by Bang!

Single by Bang!
- Released: 19 January 1998
- Genre: Happy hardcore
- Length: 6:43 (Ham's mix); 5:29 (Euro mix)
- Label: Next Generation
- Songwriter: Nick Arnold

Bang! singles chronology
"Cloudy Daze" (1997)	"Shooting Star" (1998)

Audio
- "Shooting Star" (Euro mix) on YouTube

"Shooting Star" is a song by British happy hardcore band Bang!, written by Nick Arnold. It was released as a 12-inch vinyl single in the United Kingdom in January 1998. The song later experienced success when covered by English electronic music duo Flip & Fill in 2002.

== Flip & Fill version ==
"Shooting Star"

Single by Flip & Fill
- B-side: "True Love Never Dies"
- Released: 15 July 2002
- Studio: The Hutch (UK)
- Genre: Hard house
- Length: 3:14 (radio edit)
- Label: All Around the World
- Songwriter: Nick Arnold
- Producers: Flip & Fill

Flip & Fill singles chronology
"True Love Never Dies" (2002)	"Shooting Star" (2002)	"I Wanna Dance with Somebody" (2003)

Audio
- "Shooting Star" on YouTube

"Shooting Star" was covered by Flip & Fill and released as their second single on 15 July 2002. Produced by Flip & Fill, the track's lead vocals are performed by Karen Parry. Upon its release, the song became Flip & Fill's highest-charting single in the United Kingdom, peaking at number three on the UK Singles Chart. It also reached number 34 in Ireland, where it is their longest-charting single. "Shooting Star" was later included on Flip & Fill's only studio album, Floorfillas, in 2003.

=== Release and reception ===
In the United Kingdom, record label All Around the World released "Shooting Star" on 15 July 2002 across three formats: two CD singles and a 12-inch vinyl single. Six days after its release, on 21 July, the song debuted and peaked at number three on the UK Singles Chart, becoming Flip & Fill's highest-charting single in their home country and their second top-10 hit there, after "True Love Never Dies" earlier that year. The song spent 11 weeks in the UK top 100: 10 weeks in 2002 and one week in 2005, when it re-appeared at number 87 that January. In 2024, the British Phonographic Industry (BPI) certified the song gold for sales and streams of over 400,000 units.

"Shooting Star" also charted in Ireland. On 18 July 2002, the track debuted at number 36 on the Irish Singles Chart, the same position "True Love Never Dies" had peaked at six months earlier. The following week, the song rose to its peak of number 34, and it spent six week within the Irish top 50; as of 2026, it is Flip & Fill's longest-charting single in Ireland. On the Eurochart Hot 100, the single debuted and peaked at number 15 based on its combined British and Irish sales. It spent four weeks on this chart throughout August 2002.

=== Track listings ===
UK CD1

1. "Shooting Star" (Flip & Fill radio edit)
2. "Shooting Star" (Stimulant DJ's remix)
3. "Shooting Star" (Pascal remix)
4. "Shooting Star" (music video)

UK CD2

1. "Shooting Star" (Flip & Fill original mix)
2. "Shooting Star" (CJ Stone remix)
3. "True Love Never Dies"

UK 12-inch single

A1. "Shooting Star" (Flip & Fill original mix)
A2. "True Love Never Dies" (a capella)
B1. "Shooting Star" (CJ Stone remix)

=== Credits and personnel ===
Credits are lifted from the UK CD1 liner notes.

Studio

- Recorded at The Hutch Studio (UK)

Personnel

- Nick Arnold – writing
- Karen Parry – vocals
- Sue Quin – backing vocals
- Flip & Fill – production
- Lee Monteverde – engineering

=== Charts ===
Chart (2002)	Peak position
Europe (Eurochart Hot 100)	15
Ireland (IRMA)	34
Scottish Singles Sales (Official Charts)	3
UK Singles (Official Charts)	3
UK Dance (Official Charts)	3

=== Certifications ===
Region	Certification	Certified units/sales
United Kingdom (BPI)	Gold	400,000^{‡}
^{‡} Sales+streaming figures based on certification alone.
