= DJ Seduction =

British hardcore musician

- Born: John Kalkan
- Genre: Happy hardcore
- Occupations: Record producer, DJ

John Kalkan, known professionally as DJ Seduction, is a British hardcore/ happy hardcore disc jockey and record producer who has released several single and mix albums which have charted in the UK, and is known for his significant impact on the happy hardcore music scene.

== Career ==
In 1993 the rave music scene was fragmenting and there was a hardcore scene breakaway, which included both Slipmatt and DJ Seduction, who produced breakbeat tracks which were less dark and more "uplifting" and became happy hardcore. About the same time, DJ Seduction released the singles "Hardcore Heaven/You and Me" and "Come On", which reached numbers 26 and 37 in the UK Singles chart respectively. In 1994 he released "Samplemania", which was cited by Muzik magazine as a "big" track of the genre and was re-released in 1997 with a remix by Force & Styles. Seduction is known to use samples in his music, exemplified by the vocals of Maddy Prior in early 90s track "Sub Dub".

In 1996, along with DJ Sy, Seduction released the compilation mix album Hardcore N.R.G. which reached number 24 on the UK Compilation Chart. His 1998 album Old Skool (Live at Bagleys) received a 2.5* review by Allmusic staff. In 2004 Seduction had two tracks, "Bust the New Jam" and "Step to the Side", featured on the mix compilation album Bonkers: Silver Edition.

DJ Seduction worked with Stu Allan on the Hardcore Adrenaline mix compilation series, the first volume of which peaked at number 2 on the UK Compilation Chart in 2007. Volume 2 peaked at number 6, also in 2007. The third edition in the series, Hardcore Adrenaline 3, was reviewed in the Liverpool Echo which stated that Seduction is "hardcore to the bone", and peaked at number 27 in the UK chart.

As well as producing and performing Seduction is known as a promoter, including the Uproar rave event.

== Discography ==
Singles
| Title | Year | Peak UK Singles | Notes |
|---|---|---|---|
| "Hardcore Heaven/You and Me" | 1992 | 26 | |
| "Come On" | 1992 | 37 | |
| "Sub Dub" | 1993 | | |
| "Samplemania" | 1994 | | re-released in 1997 |
| "Rushin'" | 1997 | | with DJ Sy |
