= DJ Sharkey =

British musical artist and producer

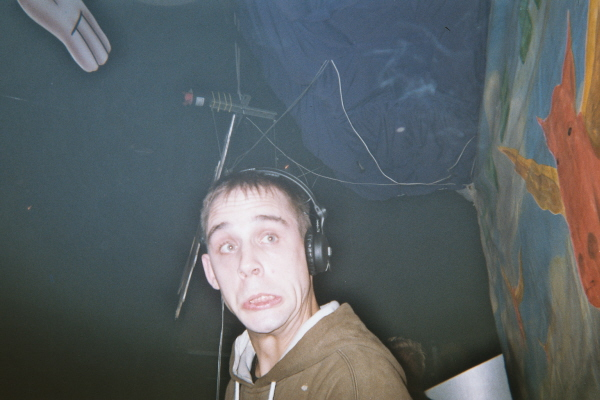
- DJ Sharkey in 2002

Background information
- Born: Jonathan Kneath; 25 July 1974 (age 52)
- Origin: Plymouth, England
- Genres: UK hard house, hardcore techno, gabber
- Instrument: Turntables
- Years active: 1992–2011; 2017–present

Jonathan Kneath (born on 25 July 1974), known by his stage name DJ Sharkey, is a British record producer, disc jockey and rapper. As of September 2011, he is semi-retired from music production and performance. Sharkey has performed in the United Kingdom, the United States, Australia, Canada, and Japan.

== Career ==
Sharkey initially became known as an MC at "hardcore rave" events in Britain in 1993. In 1995, he moved into music production, teaming up with DJ Hixxy to release the track "Toy Town", which proved one of the most significant signature tunes of the UK's happy hardcore style in the 1990s. This led both Sharkey and Hixxy to being signed by the UK-based dance music label React Music, and the pair released Bonkers, the first in a series of albums which has become the best-selling hardcore compilation series of all time. "Revolutions", a release on React, reached 53 on the UK charts, and Sharkey consequently released the album Hard Life in 1998.

Sharkey also produced mixes for Bonkers 2, 3, 4, 5, 8, 9, 10, 11, 12, 13, 14, 15, 16, and 17. Volumes 4 and 5 achieved silver sales status in the UK with Bonkers 3 reaching gold status. In 2001, Sharkey made his first appearance on the Eurodance compilation Dancemania series, at Speed 6, along with Hixxy. He was invited to mix on BBC Radio 1 in 2003, performing on John Peel's show.

== Retirement ==
In January 2011, Sharkey announced his retirement from Hardcore and Freeform. He completed a final tour, playing in various countries around the world, and then reportedly retired in September 2011. He returned to the hardcore scene in 2017, and got back into production in 2020, reviving the Bonkers label.

In 2021, Sharkey started his own show called Bonkers Beat on the online radio station Beat 106 Scotland on Friday nights.
