= React Music Limited =

British independent record label

- Founded: 1990
- Founder: James Horrocks and Thomas Foley
- Genre: Electronic dance music • Techno • House music • Acid house • Rave
- Country of origin: England
- Location: London
- Official website: www.react-music.com

React Music Limited was a British independent record label, based in London, formed in 1990 by James Horrocks and Thomas Foley. James Horrocks was initially involved with successful dance music independent Rhythm King, and React pursued a similar approach — specifically electronic dance music, house music, acid house, techno and rave, along with newer "dance" oriented subgenres which emerged throughout the 1990s. These included hard house, tech house, trance, hardbag, happy hardcore, drum and bass and chill out.

React stood for Record Entertainment And Computer Technology, the name was thought up by James's little brother Alex and his best mate Geoffrey Richards.

== Artists ==
React enjoyed commercial success within the dance/club scene. The artists at React varied, from short-term "one hit wonders" to longer-term acts, which released numerous singles/albums and included:

- The Source featuring Candi Staton: Generally considered one of React's best selling singles, "You Got the Love" was originally a bootleg combining Frankie Knuckles/Jamie Principle's house track "Your Love" with an obscure recording from Candi Staton. The single was a success and reached No. 4 on the UK Singles Chart in February 1991 and No. 3 when it was re-released in March 1997. The Source (now used as an alias of John Truelove) also reached No. 38 in August 1997 with the single "Clouds". Candi Staton's music career was revitalised with "You Got the Love", and React also enjoyed UK top 40 success with her singles "Love on Love", which reached No. 27 in April 1999, and her disco track "Young Hearts Run Free", which was re-issued and reached No. 29 in August 1999.
- "The Age of Love": was released by React in 1992 and is considered one of the first trance records and had a slow burning effect in the dance/club scene. When re-released in July 1997 and September 1998, it reached No. 17 and No. 38 respectively on the UK Singles Chart and is one of React's most successful singles.
- Mrs Wood: Joanna no. 40 (Sept 1995), "Heartbreak" feat. Eve Gallagher no. 44 (1996), Joanna no. 34 (Oct 1997) and "1,2,3,4" no. 61 (1998)
- Billie Ray Martin: also known as BRM
- Blu Peter
- John '00' Fleming
- GTO/Technohead
- Antarctica
- Seb
- S-J: "I Feel Divine" no. 30 (Jan 1998)
- Sundance: "Sundance" no. 33 (Nov 1997) and no. 37 (Oct 1998) "Living The Dream" no. 40 (February 2000)
- Mash!: "U Don't Have To Say U Love Me" no. 37 (May 1994)
- Millstart/Jeff Mills
- The Hellfire Club/Baby Doc
- Shimmon & Woolfson
- Elevator
- Alex Lee
- Hixxy
- Sharkey
- Fierce Ruling Diva
- Armadillo
- Contact
- Subterfuge
- Planets In Transit
- Madame Dubois
- DJ Gee
- Pepper Sweeney
- Zouk presents Transcendental Experience
- Rotterdam Termination Source
- The Knights of the Occasional Table

== Success with compilation albums ==
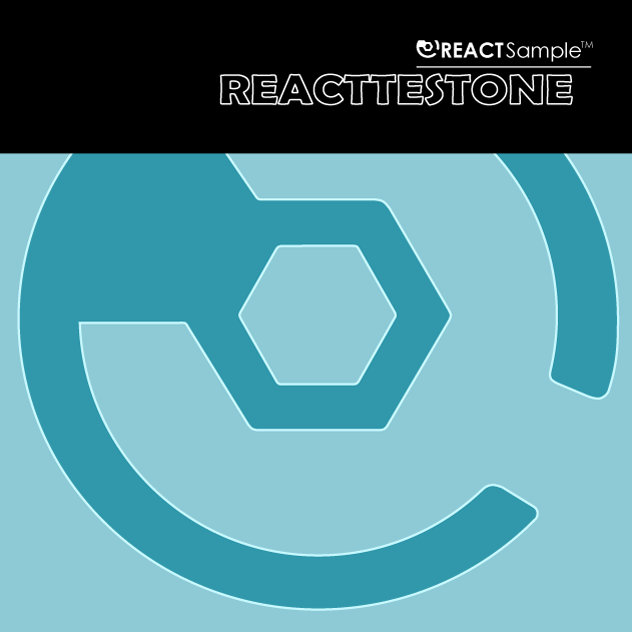
Test One Album by React

React was also successful with a wide variety of compilation albums which crossed a wide spectrum of the dance/club scenes. Notable releases included;

- Bonkers: the UK's best-selling "happy hardcore" compilation.
- Reactivate: Techno/trance compilation. Volumes 1-9 were a single disc of unmixed tracks. From volume 11 onwards, the series included two discs of unmixed music and an additional one disc mix. Volume 10 had a single disc of unmixed tracks, and a separate one disc mix. The last true release in this series was Reactivate 18, with a two disc mix CD, Reactivate Energise, appearing later. Volumes 9 and 10 were re-released under Resist Music. The Reactivate series sold over half a million albums, and was known for pioneering new electronic music. A retrospective best-of compilation, Reactivate ’91 – ‘01, was released in 2015.
- Cafe del Mar/Real Ibiza: covering the balearic/Ibiza scene.
- Artcore/Drum & Bass Arena: Drum and bass based compilations.
- Dope On Plastic!: a trip hop based compilation.
- Heavenly Presents Live At The Social: a compilation capturing Heavenly Records successful club night The Heavenly Social.
- Technohead: a hardcore techno/gabber compilation from GTO's Michael Wells.
- React Test: A series of low priced sampler CDs.

A series of DJ-mix compilations were also developed by React. These were well received by the dance/club scene and notable releases included;

- Carl Cox: F.A.C.T : Future Alliance of Communication and Tecknology.
- Jeff Mills: Live at the Liquid Room, Tokyo, The Other Day, At First Sight and Exhibitionist.
- Laurent Garnier: Laboratoire Mix.
- Norman Jay: Good Times.
- Felix da Housecat: A Bugged Out Mix By Felix Da Housecat.
- Dave Clarke: World Service.
- Dave Angel: Flavours Of Tech Funk.

== Administration / Resist Music ==

In July 2004, the company was owed in excess of £1m in distributed income from the Beechwood Music groups, that went into voluntary administration in June that year. React was then forced into voluntary administration as it was unable to extract any monies owed.

React's James Horrocks and Melissa Kemp set up Resist Music in its place. It acquired the staff, rights and catalogue of React. In September 2009, Resist Music was sold to Phoenix Music International Ltd.

On 25 October 2012, React posted they were "back on the block" with a revived website. The web site was last captured on January 24, 2025 and has since gone offline.

== See also ==
- List of record labels
