= Hixxy =

British DJ and producer (born 1975)

- Born: Ian Hicks; 3 August 1975 (age 50)
- Origin: Portsmouth
- Genres: Happy hardcore, Rave
- Occupations: Record producer, Disc Jockey
- Website: www.hixxy.com

Hixxy, or DJ Hixxy, (real name Ian Hicks, born 1975) is a British disc jockey and electronic music producer known for his innovative work in the UK happy hardcore scene, co-founding the Raver Baby record label, and the Bonkers compilation album series.

== Career ==
Hixxy began performing as a disc jockey at age 15 under the mentorship of DJ Ramos, and quickly became known on the English rave circuit.

Hixxy came to prominence in 1995 when he and DJ Sharkey released their track "Toy Town", which is considered "a classic of the genre, a riot of scruffy breaks and sugar-sweet vocals that signalled a schism in rave history when it was released". Being considered pivotal in the hardcore scene, "Toy Town" led to React Music releasing the first of the Bonkers compilations in 1996, with Hixxy and Sharkey mixing. The Bonkers series stretched to 19 volumes, with Hixxy as a regular contributor, and while critical reception was varied, the series was credited as the "dawning of a new era" in the UK rave music scene.

By the early 2000s Hixxy's sound had evolved, releasing tracks that adopted the more mainstream trance sound but with hardcore-inspired beats per minute. In 2004 Hixxy founded Hardcore Till I Die, a business for his musical events, through his record label Raver Baby. That same year John Peel, a BBC Radio 1 DJ who was a supporter of the hardcore scene, invited Hixxy to do a mix on his show. The mix was subsequently released on CD by React Music under the title Bonkers: Hixxy Mix as Heard on the John Peel Show. The following year Hixxy partnered with Darren Styles to follow up the Bonkers series by initiating another popular compilation mix series called Clubland X-Treme Hardcore, which fellow artist MC Storm claimed to be "another massive turning point for hardcore".

Hixxy has a prolific touring and performance record, both nationally in the UK and internationally with shows in the United States and Australia. As of 2023 Hixxy continues to perform live, often with fellow hardcore innovators such as DJ Dougal at events including the Bang Face Weekender in Southport.

== Discography ==
Selected singles

Title	Artist	Release date	Peak chart positions	Certifications
Title	Artist	Release date	UK Dance	Certifications
"Toy Town"	Hixxy, Sharkey	1995	24	
"Lullaby"	Hixxy, Heatwave	1996	35	
"Get into Love" / "Whistle"	Hixxy, Sunset Regime	1997	17	

Selected mix albums

Title	Mixed by	Release date	Peak chart positions	Certifications
Title	Mixed by	Release date	UK Comp	Certifications
Bonkers	Hixxy, Sharkey	1996	25	UK: Silver
Bonkers 2: Now We're Totally Bonkers	Hixxy, Sharkey	1997	10	
Bonkers 3: A Journey into Madness	Hixxy, Sharkey, Dougal	1997	31	UK: Gold
Bonkers 4: World Frenzy	Hixxy, Sharkey, Dougal	18 June 1998	8	UK: Silver
Bonkers 12: The Dirty Dozen	Hixxy, Sharkey, Scott Brown, Breeze & Styles	April 2004	7	
Hardcore Til I Die	Hixxy, Darren Styles, Breeze	2004		UK: Gold
Bonkers: Hixxy Mix as Heard on the John Peel Show	Hixxy	2004		
Clubland X-Treme Hardcore	Darren Styles, Breeze, Hixxy	2 May 2005	1	UK: Gold
Clubland X-Treme Hardcore 2	Darren Styles, Breeze, Hixxy	6 February 2006	1	UK: Gold
Clubland X-Treme Hardcore 3	Darren Styles, Breeze, Hixxy	11 December 2006	11	UK: Gold
Best of Bonkers	Hixxy & Re-Con, Sharkey & Druid, Scott Brown	15 January 2007	9	
Clubland X-Treme Hardcore 4	Darren Styles, Breeze, Hixxy	3 December 2007	7	UK: Gold
Clubland X-Treme Hardcore 5	Darren Styles, Breeze, Hixxy	8 December 2008	15	UK: Silver
Bonkers: The Original Hardcore	Sharkey, Chris Unknown, Hixxy	11 May 2009	8	

== See also ==
- Kutski
- Gammer
- Slipmatt
