= Flip & Fill =

English electronic music duo

- Also known as: Chapter One, Pascal, Booty Callers
- Origin: Manchester, England
- Genres: Electronic dance music
- Years active: 1996–present
- Labels: Filtrate
- Members: Graham Turner; Mark Hall

Flip & Fill are an English electronic dance music duo, based in Manchester, England, consisting of the producers/remixers, DJs Graham Turner and Mark Hall. They are signed to the Filtrate record label.

== Career ==
Having released tracks since 2000, they reached No. 34 in the UK Singles Chart in March 2001 with "True Love Never Dies", based on a mash-up of "Airwave" by Rank 1 and Donna Williams' "True Love Never Dies", with re-recorded vocals by Kelly Llorenna. Remixed and re-released, it reached No. 7 in February 2002.

In addition to Llorenna, Karen Parry has also provided vocals for the act, including on their 2002 No. 3 UK hit, "Shooting Star" Jo James is another singer who provided vocals for their releases, "Field of Dreams" and a cover version of the Whitney Houston hit "I Wanna Dance With Somebody". They have also produced a remix of Ayumi Hamasaki's song "July 1st" which peaked at No. 3 on Japan's Oricon album chart.

The band recorded a cover version of the Pop! song, "Heaven and Earth", but it was not released as a single.

The band are no longer signed to AATW.

The band have recently set up their own record label "Filtrate".

== Discography ==
=== Albums ===
- 2003 – Floor Fillas – UK No. 29, BPI: Silver

=== Singles ===
- 2001 – "True Love Never Dies" [featuring Kelly Llorenna] – UK No. 34 (2002 remix - No. 7), AUS No. 88, BPI: Silver
- 2002 – "Shooting Star" [featuring Karen Parry] – UK No. 3, BPI: Gold
- 2003 – "I Wanna Dance With Somebody" [featuring Jo James] – UK No. 13
- 2003 – "Shake Ya Shimmy" [vs. Porn Kings] – UK No. 28
- 2003 – "Field of Dreams" [featuring Jo James] – UK No. 28
- 2004 – "Irish Blue" [featuring Junior] – UK No. 20
- 2004 – "Discoland" [featuring Karen Parry] – UK No. 11
- 2023 - "Livin' On A Prayer" [featuring Ultrabeat]

=== Unreleased tracks ===
- 1999 – "Memory"
- 1999 – "Free Your Soul"
- 2004 – "Pacific Sun (Lullaby)"
- 2005 – "Six Days (On The Run)"
- 2006 – "Angel" [featuring Karen Danzig]
- 2007 – "U R The Best Thing"
- 2007 – "Heaven & Earth" [featuring Jo James]
- 2007 – "Single Life"
- 2008 – "A Girl Like Me" [featuring Lara McAllen]
- 2008 – "Heartbeat" [featuring Lara McAllen]

=== Remixes ===
- 1999 – Project 3 "All For One"
- 2000 – DJ Aligator "The Whistle Song"
- 2001 – Kelly Llorenna "Tell It to My Heart"
- 2001 – Rozalla "Everybody's Free"
- 2001 – Milk Inc. "In My Eyes"
- 2001 – Interactive "Forever Young"
- 2001 – N-Trance "Set You Free"
- 2001 – Clubstar "Clubstar"
- 2001 – S Club 7 "Stronger"
- 2002 – Ayumi Hamasaki "July 1st"
- 2002 – Sophie Ellis-Bextor "Music Gets the Best of Me"
- 2002 – Trinity-X "Forever"
- 2002 – Aquagen "Hard To Say I'm Sorry"
- 2002 – Orion Too "Hope And Wait"
- 2002 – Lasgo "Something"
- 2002 – Lasgo "Pray"
- 2002 – DJ Aligator "Lollipop"
- 2002 – Milk Inc. "Land of the Living"
- 2002 – Rachel McFarlane – "Lover"
- 2002 – DJ Sammy & Yanou featuring Do "Heaven"
- 2002 – Girls Aloud "Sound of the Underground"
- 2002 – Scooter "Nessaja"
- 2002 – The Time Frequency "Real Love"
- 2002 – Soda Club featuring Hannah Alethea "Take My Breath Away"
- 2002 – Aurora "If You Could Read My Mind"
- 2002 – Milk Inc. "Walk on Water"
- 2002 – Aurora "The Day It Rained Forever"
- 2002 – Apollo "Dance"
- 2002 – Girls Aloud "I Think We're Alone Now"
- 2002 – S Club "Alive"
- 2002 – Paffendorf "Be Cool"
- 2002 – Angelle "Joy And Pain"
- 2002 – Porn Kings vs. Flip & Fill "Shake Ya Shimmy"
- 2001 – Kelly Llorenna "Heart of Gold"
- 2003 – Alex C. feat. Yasmin K. "Rhythm of the Night"
- 2003 – Lazard "4 O'Clock (In the Morning)"
- 2003 – The System presents Kerri B "If You Leave Me Now"
- 2003 – Miss Peppermint "Welcome To Tomorrow"
- 2003 – Q-Tex "Power of Love"
- 2003 – Ultrabeat "Pretty Green Eyes"
- 2003 – Indien "Show Me Love"
- 2003 – Rezonance Q "Someday"
- 2003 – Big Ang featuring Siobhan "It's Over Now"
- 2003 – XTM presents Annia "Fly on the Wings of Love"
- 2003 – Tiffany Gayle "Do You Wanna Dance"
- 2003 – Kaci "I'm Not Anybody's Girl"
- 2003 – Rachel Stevens "Sweet Dreams My LA Ex"
- 2004 – Special D. "Come With Me"
- 2004 – DJ Jose "Hecitate"
- 2004 – Quango & Zunie featuring Nikki Belle "Music Is My Life"
- 2004 – Clear Vu "I Adore"
- 2004 – Laura Branigan "Self Control"
- 2004 – Scooter "Jigga Jigga!"
- 2004 – Ashley Jade "Let Me Be Your Fantasy"
- 2004 – Royal Gigolos "California Dreamin'"
- 2004 – Girls Aloud "Jump"
- 2004 – Girls Aloud "The Show"
- 2004 – Neo Cortex "Elements"
- 2004 – Styles & Breeze featuring Karen Danzig "Heartbeatz"
- 2004 – Ultrabeat "Feelin' Fine"
- 2004 – Ultrabeat "Better Than Life"
- 2004 – Marly "You Never Know"
- 2004 – Full Force "Just The Way It Is"
- 2004 – Awesome 3 Feat Bailey "Don't Go"
- 2004 – LMC vs. U2 "Take Me to the Clouds Above"
- 2004 – Open Arms "Hey Mr. DJ"
- 2004 – Porn Kings vs. Mix Factory "Take Me Away"
- 2004 – DJ Milano "Sweet Child of Mine"
- 2004 – Dance Assassins featuring Karen Parry "Here I Am"
- 2004 – Scott Brown "I Would Stay"
- 2005 – Special D "Nothing I Won't Do"
- 2005 – Route-1 featuring Jenny Frost "Crash Landing"
- 2005 – Access 3 "Promised Land"
- 2005 – Francesca "You Are The One"
- 2005 – Northstarz "Baby Baby"
- 2005 – Escape "What I Gotta Do"
- 2005 – Escape "Flying Away"
- 2005 – Groove Coverage "Runaway"
- 2005 – Ultrabeat "Feel It With Me"
- 2005 – XTM & DJ Chucky presents Annia "Give Me Your Love"
- 2005 – Rachel Stevens "I Said Never Again (But Here We Are)"
- 2005 – Killa Deejayz "Freed From Desire"
- 2005 – Girls Aloud "Wake Me Up"
- 2006 – September "Satellites"
- 2006 – Headhunters featuring Karen Danzig "I've Got A Feeling"
- 2006 – Nalin & Kane featuring Alex Prince "Cruising"
- 2006 – Eddie Thoneick & Kurd Maverick "Love Sensation"
- 2006 – Micky Modelle & Jessy "Over You"
- 2006 – Lacuna "Celebrate The Summer"
- 2006 – Helena Paparizou "Mambo"
- 2006 – Frisco "The Summer Is Magic"
- 2006 – Scooter "Apache Rocks The Bottom!"
- 2006 – Tall Paul "Rock Da House"
- 2006 – Darren Styles "Save Me"
- 2006 – Ultrasun "We Can Runaway"
- 2006 – Cascada "Everytime We Touch"
- 2006 – Starstylers "Keep on Moving"
- 2006 – D:Code featuring Emma "My Direction"
- 2006 – Dancing DJs "Right Beside You"
- 2006 – D:Code featuring Emma "Out of My Hands"
- 2007 – Oceanic "Insanity"
- 2007 – Kate Ryan "Voyage Voyage"
- 2007 – N-Euro "Lover on the Line"
- 2007 – Delusion featuring Jenna C "Never Gunna Let You Go"
- 2007 – Alex C. Feat. Yasmin K. – "Sweetest Ass in the World"
- 2007 – Cascada "What Do You Want From Me?"
- 2007 – Velvet "Fix Me"
- 2007 – Sublime "The Rain"
- 2007 – Liz Kay "When Love Becomes A Lie"
- 2007 – Kelly Llorenna "I Will Love Again"
- 2007 – FHM High Street Honeys "I Touch Myself"
- 2007 – M&C featuring Rebecca Rudd "Magic Touch"
- 2007 – Paradise "See The Light"
- 2007 – Ultrabeat vs. Darren Styles "Sure Feels Good"
- 2007 – Inaya Day "U Spin Me"
- 2007 – Cascada "What Hurts the Most"
- 2007 – Shanie "Don't Give Me Your Life"
- 2007 – Dame Shirley Bassey "Get The Party Started"
- 2007 – Killa Deejayz "Around The World (La La La La La)"
- 2007 – Audiolush "Feel The Power"
- 2007 – Melanie Flash "Halfway To Heaven"
- 2007 – Micky Modelle vs. Jessy "Show Me Heaven"
- 2007 – Work-A-Holics "9 To 5"
- 2007 – Frisco "Sea of Love"
- 2007 – Hixxy "More & More"
- 2007 – Girls Aloud "Sexy! No No No"
- 2007 – Scooter "The Question What Is The Question?"
- 2007 – Dancing DJs featuring Caroline Griffin "Amazed"
- 2008 – Scooter "I'm Lonely"
- 2008 – Manian "Hold Me Tonight"
- 2008 – Dee Grees vs. The Real Booty Babes "Apologize"
- 2008 – Micky Modelle vs. Samantha Mumba "Gotta Tell Ya"
- 2008 – Micky Modelle "Take Me Away"
- 2008 – Girls Aloud "Something Kinda Ooooh"
- 2008 – Bimbo Jones "Come And Fly With Me"
- 2008 – Eyeopener "Singin' Dam Di Da Doo"
- 2009 – N-Force "All My Life"
- 2009 – Captain Jack "Dream A Dream"
- 2009 – Yanou "Brighter Day"
- 2009 – Stunt "Fade Like The Sun"
- 2009 – Angelic "It's My Turn"
- 2009 – Girls Aloud "The Promise"
- 2009 – Digital Rush "I'm on My Way"
- 2009 – D:Code "Who Are You"
- 2009 – Lockout featuring Chenai "Bounce"
- 2009 – Friday Night Posse featuring Caroline Griffin "Before He Cheats"
- 2010 – Manian "Ravers in the UK"
- 2010 – Manian "Loco"
- 2010 – Dan Balan "Chica Bomb"
- 2010 – Ultrabeat "Bring It Back"
- 2010 – DJ Roxx "The Weekend Has Come"
- 2011 – Azuro featuring Elly "Ti Amo"
