= Happy hardcore =

Dance music genre

- Stylistic origins: Breakbeat hardcore; hardcore techno
- Cultural origins: Early 1990s, UK, Belgium, Netherlands, Germany
- Derivative forms: UK hardcore

Happy hardcore, also known as 4-beat, is a subgenre of hardcore dance music. It emerged both from the UK breakbeat hardcore rave scene, and Belgian, German and Dutch hardcore techno scenes in the early 1990s.

Although having some similarities, happy hardcore differs from gabber in that happy hardcore tends to have breakbeats running alongside the 4/4 kick drum.

== History ==
=== Origins ===
The breakbeat hardcore rave scene was beginning to fragment by late 1992 into a number of subsequent breakbeat-based genres: darkcore (tracks embracing dark-themed samples and stabs), hardcore jungle (reggae basslines and influences became prominent), and 4-beat also known as "happy hardcore" where piano rolls and uplifting vocals were still central to the sound. DJs such as Slipmatt, DJ Sy, DJ Seduction, Clarkee, Wishdokta, DJ Dougal, DJ Vibes, and Billy Daniel Bunter continued to play and put out music of this nature throughout 1994 – notably Slipmatt's 'SMD' releases, Wishdokta recording as the 'Naughty Naughty' pseudonym, and Seduction on his Impact Records label, as well as the labels Hectic, Homegrown, Kniteforce, and Just Another Label. Dreamscape, Helter Skelter, and Fusion were among the raves where the music was played.

=== 1990s growth ===
The sound of happy hardcore changed in the 1990s, with tracks increasingly losing their breakbeats towards a stomping distorted 909 4/4 kick drum pattern, with more original vocal leads and stab patterns. DJs and producers that began to come through included Hixxy, Breeze, Force & Styles, DJ Sharkey, DJ DNA, and Kevin Energy and tracks that started to define the genre included "Heart of Gold", "Pretty Green Eyes", "Cloudy Daze", "Sunshine After the Rain", "Above the Clouds", "Six Days", "Love of My Life", "Perfect Dreams", and "Field of Dreams". In London, the sound was championed by the pirate radio station Dream FM, as well as later supported by Eruption FM. Throughout the mid-late 1990s, the compilation series Bonkers would be commercially popular and showcase the latest happy hardcore music. Bonkers only really came into being due to the record label React showing interest in Toy Town, and Hixxy and Sharkey convincing the label to do a compilation album deal instead.

=== 2000s ===
In the UK, the scene received its own special on BBC Radio 1 called John Peel Is Not Enough (named after the track by CLSM) in 2004 paying homage to the late John Peel. The scene continued to expand, with compilations such as Clubland X-Treme Hardcore, and an evermore youthful audience. The Hardcore Adrenaline compilation series started in 2007, mixed by Stu Allan and DJ Seduction it showcased established and up and coming artists and achieved UK chart success. In 2009, DJ Kutski hosted a show featuring hard dance and hardcore on Radio 1.

== Happy hardcore compilations ==
Notable happy hardcore compilation albums include:

- Bonkers
- Clubland X-Treme Hardcore
- Dancemania Speed
- Happy 2b Hardcore
- Hardcore Euphoria
- Hardcore Heaven
- Hardcore Adrenaline

== See also ==
- Breakbeat hardcore
- Gabber
