= Kutski =

British radio DJ

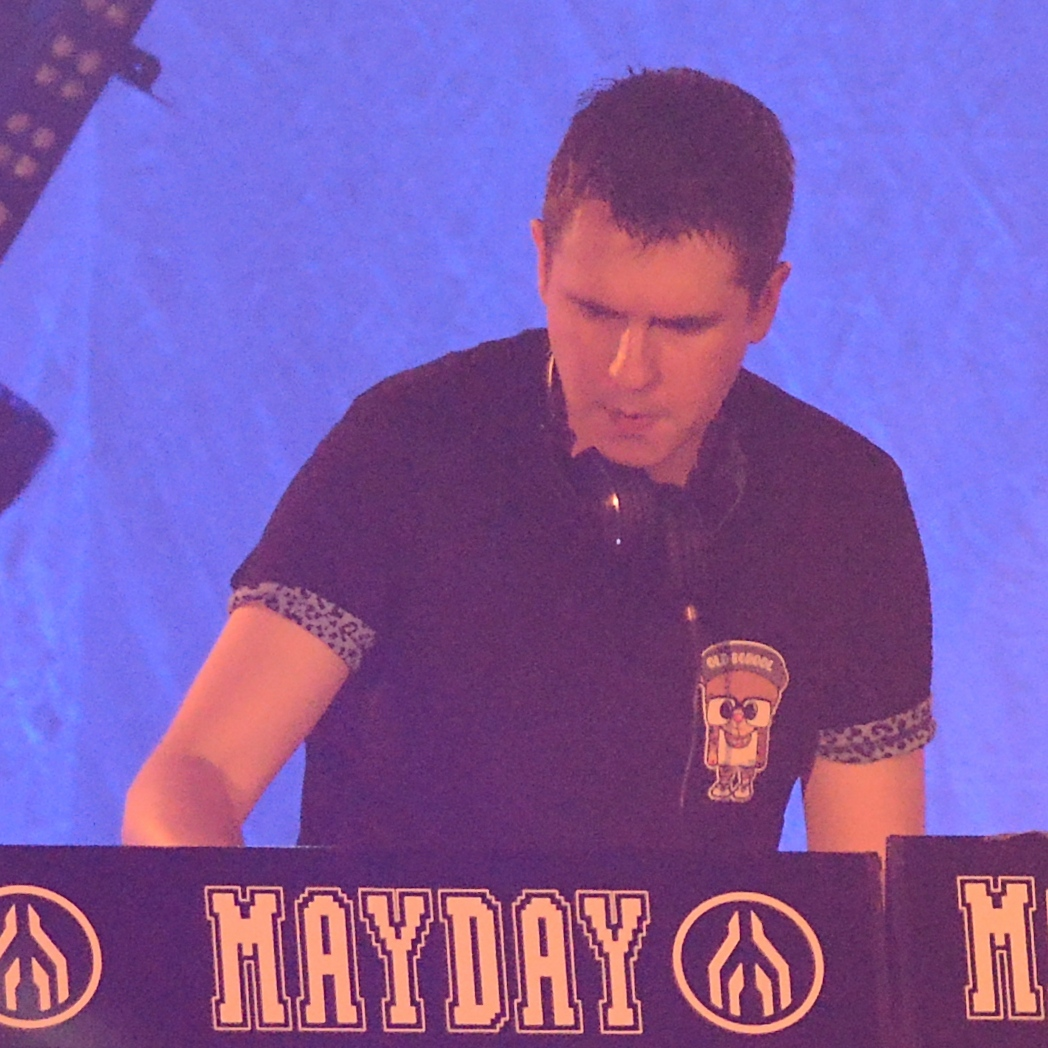
- Kutski at Mayday 2014
- Born: John Walker; 4 February 1982 (age 44); Chester, England
- Presenting career
- Style: Hardstyle, hard trance, hardcore techno
- Country: United Kingdom
- Website: djkutski.com

John Walker (born 4 February 1982) known by his stage name, Kutski is a British radio DJ, from Chester, England. He presented various shows for BBC Radio 1, playing a variety of hard dance music, including breakbeat, electro, hard trance, hardcore and hardstyle. Kutski now produces and hosts a weekly podcast, "Keeping the Rave Alive", which plays music similar to that heard on his BBC Radio 1 shows.

== Career ==
Kutski started DJing when he was 15 years old. The first big event he played was Elevate in Bangor, which resulted in earning a residency. Since then he has appeared at underground and mainstream hard dance clubs across the UK. He incorporates DMC-style scratching and mixing into every set.

His residencies have included Tasty in London, Ripsnorter in Bristol, and Elevate in Bangor.

In 2004, Kutski released his debut track "Making Me Itch" under the name SPX. He signed to the Knuckleheadz label and was featured on the compilations Insomnia 4 and Extreme Euphoria 3.

In 2005 Kutski joined BBC Radio 1 to host, by rotation, a slot of The Residency, a Pete Tong led initiative to champion different forms of dance music. Of the six DJs hosting, Kutski was selected in order to champion underground hard dance/hardcore.

His tune "Closer To God", released on X-Cite, was reviewed positively and supported by Anne Savage, Lisa Lashes and The Tidy Boys. A collaboration with Ollie from Warp Brothers was signed for release on the Tidy Tools EP, and featured on the Tidy Addict compilation. Kustki was one of the three DJs, alongside Steve Hill and Zatox, to mix the 2012 Hard Dance Awards Album.

Kutski works for DJ Magazine as a hard dance and hardcore column writer, and also has a YouTube channel about his production techniques. He also works with manufacturers Vestax, Serato, Native Instruments, Stanton & Akai and Pioneer to test out software or kits.

In Summer 2010, Kutski played at a number of large festivals, including Creamfields, Dance Valley, Global Gathering, Electrocity, PlanetLove, and Parklife. His tours included the US, Canada, Australia, New Zealand, Sweden, Poland, the Netherlands and Germany, trips to Ayia Napa, Tenerife, Gran Canaria and Kavos.

2010 also saw Kutski collaborate with Kiddfectious King Alex Kidd for the launch of The Kidd & Kutski Experience, in which the duo mixed the first hard dance covermount CD on Mixmag in almost a decade.

In 2012 Kutski launched the "Keeping the Rave Alive" brand, sometimes known as KTRA, which includes a popular podcast covering various genres of the hard dance scene and also educational tutorials. KTRA is also a record label, merchandise brand, and event promoter. Kutski has won a number of awards including being voted as the UK's no 1 Hard Dance DJ in a 2010 DJ Mag poll.

In 2018, along with Kit Hype, Kutski released the single "Fly To The Stars" on the Foolish label. Critic Andy Whitby, of Mixmag, gave the track an 8* review calling it "angry hardstyle power and utter cheddar".
