= Ultrabeat: The Album =

Studio album by Ultrabeat
- Released: 10 September 2007
- Recorded: 2003–2007
- Studio: Mick's House, UK
- Genre: Dance
- Length: 49:09 (standard edition)
- Label: All Around the World
- Producer: Mike Di Scala, Ian Redman (add.), Chris Henry (add.), Darren Styles (add.), Wayne Donnelly (add.)

Ultrabeat chronology
Ultrabeat: The Album (2007)	The Weekend Has Landed (2009)

Australian album cover
- Australian cover

German album cover
- German EP cover

Singles from Ultrabeat: The Album
- 1. "Pretty Green Eyes" Released: 4 August 2003; 2. "Feelin' Fine" Released: 15 December 2003; 3. "Better than Life" Released: 30 August 2004; 4. "Feel It with Me" Released: 19 September 2005; 5. "Elysium (I Go Crazy)" Released: 24 April 2006; 6. "Sure Feels Good" Released: 20 August 2007; 7. "I Wanna Touch You" Released: 4 February 2008

Ultrabeat: The Album is the début self-titled album by the British dance act Ultrabeat. It was released on 10 September 2007 (four years after their first single) with All Around the World records. The album was a success on the UK Albums Chart, as it reached number 8 in its first week.

== Background ==
The long-anticipated album comes over four years after their first single "Pretty Green Eyes" was released. According to AATW, the album was delayed for so long because Ultrabeat kept producing new tracks and re-changing the album to accommodate the new material, and also going away to places such as Miami and Ibiza delayed the album as well. It was originally, supposed to be called Better than Life: The Album and was meant to be released around the same time as the "Better than Life" single. There was many speculation after this over whether an Ultrabeat album would materialise, until the summer of 2007 when AATW announced on their website that it was getting released in September 2007, and would include all their hits and more. Some of the tracks that never made it on to the album were songs called "Stay with Me", and Re-Con songs "Free Again" and "Let It Show".

== Release ==
Professional ratings
Review scores
Source	Rating
Allmusic	2.5/5 stars

When the album was released, it charted at #8 in its first week and stayed in the Top 20 for a further three weeks, and the release of the album coincided with Ultrabeat supporting Cascada on their tour of the UK. The Album was released in Australia on 8 December 2007, with Central Station records, and in the UK, "I Wanna Touch You" was the next single released after the album, which came out at the start of 2008.

== Track listing ==
Standard edition
No.	Title	Writer(s)	Length
1.	"Intro"	Mike Di Scala, Chris Henry	0:20
2.	"Pretty Green Eyes"	Paul Hobbs, Darren Mew, Leon Van Brown	3:18
3.	"Sure Feels Good" (vs. Darren Styles)	Di Scala, Mew	3:21
4.	"Feelin' Fine"	Mew	2:59
5.	"Elysium (I Go Crazy)" (vs. Scott Brown)	Scott Brown, Di Scala, Henry	3:08
6.	"Better Than Life"	Di Scala, Paul Smith Jnr	4:12
7.	"Paradise & Dreams" (vs. Darren Styles)	Hobbs, Mew, Van Brown	3:46
8.	"I'm Not in Love"	Graham Gouldman, Eric Stewart	3:48
9.	"This Love's for Real"	Di Scala, Henry	3:35
10.	"I Wanna Touch You"	Di Scala, Henry, Lee Squires	3:06
11.	"Right Here Right Now"	Di Scala	3:28
12.	"I Want Your Love (Frankie's Lead)"	Hobbs, Mew	3:11
13.	"1000 Kisses"	Di Scala, Wayne Donnelly	3:49
14.	"Feel It with Me"	Stompy, Supreme, UFO	3:15
15.	"Goodbye"	Di Scala, Henry	3:53
Total length:			49:09

iTunes bonus track (UK)
No.	Title	Writer(s)	Length
16.	"Pacific Sun"	Mew, Hobbs, Van Brown	5:11
Total length:			54:20

Ultrabeat: The Album EP (Germany): Digital download version
No.	Title	Length
1.	"Sure Feels Good" (radio mix)	3:31
2.	"Sure Feels Good" (original mix)	6:49
3.	"Sure Feels Good" (Manox radio remix)	3:41
4.	"Sure Feels Good" (Manox remix)	6:00
5.	"I Wanna Touch You" (radio mix)	3:06
6.	"I Wanna Touch You" (original mix)	5:11
7.	"Pretty Green Eyes" (radio mix)	3:21
8.	"Pretty Green Eyes" (original mix)	6:51

Ultrabeat: The Album EP (Germany): 12-inch version
No.	Title	Length
1.	"Sure Feels Good" (original mix)	6:49
2.	"Sure Feels Good" (Manox remix)	6:00
3.	"I Wanna Touch You" (original mix)	5:11
4.	"Pretty Green Eyes" (original mix)	6:51

== Personnel ==
Ultrabeat

- Mike Di Scala – producer, vocals
- Ian Redman – additional producer
- Chris Henry – additional producer

Production

- Darren Styles – additional producer (on tracks 3 & 7)
- Wayne Donnelly – additional producer (on track 13)

Additional musicians

- Rebecca Rudd – vocals (on tracks 3, 5, 7 & 10)
- Darren Styles – keyboards (on tracks 3 & 7)

Other personnel

- Universal – distribution
- Absolute – marketing

== Chart performance ==
Chart (2007)	Peak position
Irish Albums Chart	51
UK Albums Chart	8

== Release history ==
Region	Date	Label	Format	Catalog
United Kingdom	10 September 2007	All Around the World	CD	GLOBE CD 46
Ireland	10 September 2007	All Around the World	CD	GLOBE CD 46
Australia	8 December 2007	Central Station	CD	CSR CD 5486
New Zealand	8 December 2007	Central Station	CD	CSR CD 5486
Germany	2 June 2008	Zooland	12" EP	ZOO 039
Austria	2 June 2008	Zooland	12" EP	ZOO 039
Switzerland	2 June 2008	Zooland	12" EP	ZOO 039
