= Rezonance Q =

English electronic music group

- Also known as: BCD Project, Uproar, Overdose, The Jetson, Holdon, O-Leta, 3 Amigos, Hardnox, King of Clubs, The Tranceriffs
- Origin: Liverpool, England
- Genres: Electronic, house
- Years active: 2001–2011
- Labels: BCD, All Around the World
- Past members: Mike Di Scala; Lee Butler; Les Calvert; Chris Henry

Rezonance Q (also known as BCD Project) is an English electronic group from Liverpool formed by producers Mike Di Scala, Lee Butler and Les Calvert. Di Scala also produces and remixes songs solo using the name Rezonance Q.

== History ==
Formed by Di Scala in 2001, many of the group's original productions were mashups and bootlegs of old club songs released on their own label, BCD Records. In 2002, the group released a remix of Mariah Carey's "Someday" which reached No. 134 in the UK Singles Chart. However, a re-recorded version with vocals by Nazene Langfield was released the following year on All Around the World records which became a top 20 hit, reaching No. 29 in the charts.

In 2003, the group began producing under the alias BCD Project. The group released a bootleg version of "Do You Know" on Boss Records, which sampled Michelle Gayle's vocals and "Children" by Robert Miles, which reached No. 129 in the charts. The following year, a new version was released by Angel City featuring Lara McAllen which reached No. 7 in the charts. BCD Project also released a remix of Rainy Davis' "Sweetheart" which reached No. 163 in the charts in 2003. This was later re-recorded and released by Rezonance Q on All Around the World in 2004.

The group has also remixed several songs by other artists such as "Rhythm Is a Dancer" by Snap!, "The Boys of Summer" by DJ Sammy, "Pretty Green Eyes" by Ultrabeat, "Sunrise" by Angel City and "All Together Now" by The Farm. In 2005, Chris Henry replaced Les Calvert as a member of the BCD Project and the grouped released further singles under the aliases 3 Amigos, Hardnox, King of Clubs and The Tranceriffs.

== Members ==
- Mike Di Scala – producer (2001–2011)
- Lee Butler – producer (2001–2009)
- Les Calvert – producer (2001–2005)
- Chris Henry – producer (2005–2006)

Vocalists

- Nazene Langfield – "Someday", "Sweetheart"
- Becky Lane – "All I Think About Is You", "Infinity", "Baby I Know You're Mine", "Think I Better Let You Know", "Ride Like the Wind"
- Rebecca Rudd – "Broken Wings", "I Need Somebody"

== Discography ==
=== Extended plays ===
- Rezonance Q EP (2001)
- Rezonance Q EP 2 (2001)
- Rezonance Q EP, pt. 3 (2001)
- Rezonance Q EP, pt. 4 (2002) (Note: "Someday" from Rezonance Q EP, pt. 4 peaked at number 134 on the UK Singles Chart.)
- The Unreleased EP (2004) (as BCD Project)

=== Singles ===
Title	Year	Peak chart positions		
Title	Year	UK	UK Dance	SCO
"Groovy Decktician" / "Bam-Uchi" (as Uproar)	2002	188	—	—
"Get on the Floor (It's Not Over)" / "Keep on Trying"	2002	—	—	—
"Someday"	2003	29	10	17
"Do You Know" (as BCD Project)	2003	129	—	—
"The Roof Is on Fire" (as Uproar)	2003	—	—	—
"Sweetheart" (as BCD Project)	2003	163	—	—
"Crush on You" / "Just Be Good 2 Me" (as The Jetson / Holdon)	2003	171	—	—
"I Want Bass" (as Overdose)	2003	—	—	—
"Brass Disc" (as Uproar)	2004	—	—	—
"Bow-Chi" / "Bam-Uchi" (as Uproar)	2004	—	—	—
"Get Here 2004" (as O-Leta)	2004	—	—	—
"Sweetheart"	2005	—	—	—
"Baby I Know You're Mine" (as 3 Amigos featuring Becky Lane)	2005	—	—	—
"All I Think About Is You" (as BCD Project featuring Becky Lane)	2005	—	—	—
"Ride Like the Wind" (as 3 Amigos)	2005	—	—	—
"Think I Better Let You Know" (as 3 Amigos)	2005	—	—	—
"Infinity" (as BCD Project)	2005	—	—	—
"Bang to the Elysium" (as 3 Amigos)	2006	—	—	—
"Hoppin' an Boppin'" (as Hardnox)	2006	—	—	—
"Broken Wings" (as King of Clubs featuring Rebecca Rudd)	2006	—	—	—
"I Need Somebody" (as King of Clubs featuring Rebecca Rudd)	2006	—	—	—
"Flowtation 1,2" (as The Tranceriffs)	2006	—	—	—
"Brassdisk 06" (as BCD Project)	2006	—	—	—
"Troubled Water" (as BCD vs. Clubstar)	2008	—	—	—
"How to Save a Life" (as BCD Project vs. Clubstar)	2008	—	—	—
"Mad as Hell" (with Rob Cain)	2011	—	—	—
"White Lines" (with Rob Cain)	2011	—	—	—
"—" denotes a recording that did not chart or was not released in that territory.

=== Remixes ===
Title	Year	Artist(s)
"Dance" (Rezonance Q remix)	2002	Apollo
"U Shine On" (Rezonance Q remix)	2002	Matt Darey & Marcella Woods
"Ocean of Eternity" (Rezonance Q remix)	2002	Future Breeze
"You're a Superstar" (Rezonance Q remix)	2002	Love Inc.
"Am I on Your Mind?" (Rezonance Q remix)	2002	Oxygen featuring Andrea Britton
"Land of the Living" (Rezonance Q remix)	2002	Milk Inc.
"4 O'Clock in the Morning" (Rezonance Q remix)	2003	Lazard
"Power of Love" (Rezonance Q remix)	2003	Q-Tex
"Open Your Eyes" (Rezonance Q remix)	2003	Eyeopener
"The Boys of Summer" (BCD Project remix)	2003	DJ Sammy
"Free (Let It Be)" (Rezonance Q remix)	2003	Stuart
"Love Me Right (Oh Sheila)" (Rezonance Q remix)	2003	Angel City
"Love U More" (Rezonance Q remix)	2003	Das Cockster
"Rhythm Is a Dancer" (Rezonance Q remix)	2003	Snap!
"One More Chance" (Rezonance Q remix)	2003	The Space Brothers
"Pretty Green Eyes" (Rezonance Q remix)	2003	Ultrabeat
"E" (Rezonance Q remix)	2003	Drunkenmunky
"I Luv U Baby" (Rezonance Q remix)	2003	The Original
"Get with the Remedy" (Rezonance Q remix)	2003	Azya Like
"Shining Down" (Rezonance Q remix)	2004	United in Dance
"Blow Your Horny Horns" (Rezonance Q remix)	2004	Perfect Phase
"All Together Now 2004" (Rezonance Q and BCD Project remixes)	2004	The Farm
"You're Shining" (Rezonance Q remix)	2004	Styles & Breeze
"Better Than Life" (Rezonance Q remix)	2004	Ultrabeat
"Loveshy 2004" (BCD Project remix)	2004	Kristine Blond
"Do You Know (I Go Crazy)" (BCD Project remix)	2004	Angel City
"Every Little Time" (Rezonance Q remix)	2004	Onyx featuring Gemma J
"Much Better" (Rezonance Q remix)	2004	Masta Blasta UK
"Hold Me in Your Arms" (Rezonance Q remix)	2004	Masta Blasta UK
"If I Ever See You Again" (BCD Project remix)	2005	Offbeat
"What I Gotta Do" (Rezonance Q remix)	2005	Escape
"Sunrise" (BCD Project remix)	2005	Angel City
"Heartbeatz" (Rezonance Q remix)	2005	Styles & Breeze featuring Karen Danzig
"Forgiven 2005" (Rezonance Q remix)	2005	The Space Brothers
"It's Always a Blue Sky Day" (Rezonance Q remix)	2005	Lomac
"Little Bird" (BCD Project remix)	2006	Trick Babies vs. LMC
"I O U Nothing" (Rezonance Q remix)	2006	Booty Callers
"Getting Better" (Rezonance Q remix)	2006	Darren Styles featuring Lisa Abbott
"Sure Feels Good" (Rezonance Q remix)	2007	Ultrabeat vs. Darren Styles
"Insanity" (Rezonance Q remix)	2007	Oceanic
"The Rain" (Rezonance Q remix)	2007	Sublime
"Rock the House" (BCD vs. Quadrasonic remix)	2007	Zone
"Don't You Want to Be Mine" (BCD vs. Clubstar remix)	2007	Butler & Hayes featuring Nazene
"More & More" (Rezonance Q remix)	2007	Hixxy
"Let Me Take You for a Ride" (Rezonance Q remix)	2009	KB Project vs. Delusion
"Rock to the Rhythm" (BCD vs. Klubfiller remix)	2009	Cutback featuring Federal

=== Music videos ===
Title	Year	Director(s)
"Someday"	2003	Andy Frith
