= Paradise & Dreams =

- Single cover of "Paradise & Dreams" vinyl.

Single by Force & Styles featuring Junior

from the album All over the UK
- Released: 20 October 1997
- Recorded: 1996 at UK Dance Studios, Clacton-on-Sea
- Genre: Happy hardcore
- Length: 5:44
- Label: Diverse
- Songwriter: Paul Hobbs (Force), Darren Mew (Styles) Leon Van Brown
- Producers: Force & Styles

Force & Styles singles chronology
"Pretty Green Eyes" (1997)	"Paradise & Dreams" (1997)	"Heart of Gold" (1998)

"Paradise & Dreams" is a song written and recorded by producers Force & Styles, featuring Junior which originally appeared on their album All over the UK (1996) and was released as a single in 1997. Both members of Force & Styles would later record cover versions of the song at later dates, the first was by The Force (Paul Hobbs and Flip & Fill) in 2003 and another was by Ultrabeat versus Darren Styles which appeared on both artists début albums Ultrabeat: The Album (2007) and Skydivin (2008).

== Background ==
The Force & Styles version of "Paradise & Dreams" was a happy hardcore song which first came out in 1997, on the Diverse record label. The song features MC Junior's vocals, who co-write the song.

In 1998, the year after the original version came out, Paradise & Dreams was re-recorded by Force & Styles. The new version added the female vocals of Kelia to sing the song as a duet with Junior, and she sang one of the verses solo also. This version of the song is the version that has been covered, and it was released on Force & Styles' own record label, UK Dance, as the b-side to "Cutting Deep".

=== Track listing ===
CD single (1997)

1. "Paradise & Dreams" (Force & Styles hardcore mix) – 5:44
2. "Paradise & Dreams" (Arthur Baker 7" edit mix) – 3:46
3. "Paradise & Dreams" (Walford Project house mix) – 6:54
4. "Paradise & Dreams" (Silver City trip hop mix) – 6:38
5. "Paradise & Dreams" (Arthur Baker 12" mix) – 7:53
6. "Paradise & Dreams" (original mix) – 5:33

12-inch single (1997)

A1. "Paradise & Dreams" (Arthur Baker 12" Mix)

B1. "Paradise & Dreams" (Walford Project House Mix)

B2. "Paradise & Dreams" (Arthur Baker 7" Dub Mix)

C1. "Paradise & Dreams" (Hardcore mix)

D1. "Paradise & Dreams" (DJ Friendly mix)

D2. "Paradise & Dreams" (Silver City Trip Hop mix)

12-inch single (1998)

1. "Cutting Deep" (feat. Junior) – 6:16
2. "Paradise & Dreams" (duet version) – 4:14

== Personnel ==
Force & Styles

- Paul Hobbs – producer
- Darren Mew – producer

Additional musicians

- Junior – vocals
- Kelia – vocals (on "Duet version" 1998)

Other personnel

- Schlep – artwork

== Chart performance ==
Chart (1997)	Peak position
UK Singles Chart	106

== Cover versions ==
=== The Force version ===
In 2003, the duet version of "Paradise & Dreams" was remade by Paul Hobbs and Flip & Fill, under the alias The Force. It was signed to the commercial dance label All Around the World, and the vocals were sung by two vocalists from Liverpool called Terry Byrne and Marie Lowrie. The 2003 version was released as a promo by AATW and it also featured on some of their major compilation CDs, such as Clubland 4. In 2007, all remixes of The Force's version were released as a digital download.

==== Track listing ====
12-inch promo (2003)

1. "Paradise & Dreams" (extended mix) – 7:21
2. "Paradise & Dreams" (Ultrabeat remix) – 6:18

Download EP (2007)

1. "Paradise & Dreams" (original mix) – 7:21
2. "Paradise & Dreams" (KB Project remix) – 6:14
3. "Paradise & Dreams" (Ultrabeat remix) – 6:18
4. "Paradise & Dreams" (Darren Styles remix) – 5:57
5. "Paradise & Dreams" (Scott Brown remix) – 5:56

=== Ultrabeat vs Darren Styles version ===
In 2007, one of the writers of the song, hardcore producer Darren Styles (of Force & Styles) teamed up with producers Ultrabeat to cover the song for their album, "Ultrabeat - The Album". Darren Styles was already collaborating with Ultrabeat on their sixth single "Sure Feels Good", and the two artists recorded "Paradise & Dreams" near the same time. Mike Di Scala the lead singer of Ultrabeat recorded it with the Rebecca Rudd.

Both artists had worked with the song in the past, with Darren Styles being one of the writers and part of the original artists to produce the song. Both Ultrabeat and Darren Styles had also remixed The Force's version from 2003. As well as appearing on Ultrabeat's album, a hardcore mix of the song appeared on AATW compilation album, Clubland X-Treme Hardcore 4 and it was the second release by Darren Styles's new hardcore record label, Junkbox Records, in early 2008, as a double a side with "Sure Feels Good". The song also featured on Darren Styles' solo album, "Skydivin'".

==== Personnel ====
Ultrabeat vs Darren Styles

- Mike Di Scala – vocals, producer
- Chris Henry – producer
- Darren Styles – keyboards, producer

Additional musicians

- Rebecca Rudd – vocals
