= Skydivin' =

Studio album by Darren Styles
- Released: 16 June 2008
- Recorded: 2004–2008
- Genre: Hardcore, dance
- Length: 112:55
- Label: All Around the World, Universal Music TV
- Producer: Darren Styles, Ultrabeat, Hypasonic, SHM, Styles & Breeze, N-Force, Kenny Hayes (add.)

Darren Styles chronology
All over the UK (1996)	Skydivin' (2008)	Feel the Pressure (2010)

Singles from Skydivin'
- 1. "You're Shining" Released: 19 July 2004; 2. "Heartbeatz" Released: 28 February 2005; 3. "Save Me" Released: 19 March 2007; 4. "Sure Feels Good" Released: 20 August 2007; 5. "Right by Your Side" Released: 9 June 2008; 6. "Discolights" Released: 30 June 2008

Skydivin' is the debut solo studio album by British dance musician Darren Styles.

== Background ==
Professional ratings
Review scores
Source	Rating
AllMusic	3/5 stars

The album debuted at #4 in the UK Albums Chart with sales of 22,197. A month later it was certified gold by the BPI with over 100,000 copies sold.

== Track listing ==
Disc 1: Hardcore
No.	Title	Writer(s)	Length
1.	"Flashlight"	Darren Styles	4:02
2.	"Come Running"	Styles, Francis Hill	4:14
3.	"Getting Better"	Styles	3:55
4.	"Discolights" (vs. Ultrabeat)	Styles, Mike Di Scala, Chris Henry	3:30
5.	"Save Me"	Styles	4:12
6.	"Baby I'll Let You Know"	Styles, Wayne Donnelly	3:21
7.	"I Say I Love You"	Styles, Hill, Daniel Haysom	4:07
8.	"Drop Zone"	Styles	3:35
9.	"Show Me the Sunshine"	Styles, Paul Hobbs	4:57
10.	"Skydivin'" (vocal mix)	Styles, James Broomfield	4:00
11.	"Jealous"	Styles	3:16
12.	"Just Easy" (feat. Whizzkid)	Styles, Whizzkid	3:55
13.	"Cutting Deep"	Styles, Hobbs, Leroy Van Brown	3:27
14.	"Lost the Plot"	Styles, Wayne Gibbons	3:26
15.	"Slide Away" (Styles & Breeze)	Styles & Breeze	4:29
16.	"Different Groove"	Styles	2:49
17.	"Feel Love"	Styles	4:55
Total length:			66:10

Disc 2: Commercial
No.	Title	Writer(s)	Length
1.	"Right by Your Side" (vs. N-Force)	Styles, Jochen Gradwohl, Henry	3:22
2.	"Save Me" (Nitelite remix)	Styles	3:48
3.	"Tell Me"	Styles	2:34
4.	"Girls Like You" (Fugitive Sexy Crazy edit)	Styles, Dougal, Curno	3:20
5.	"I Need You"	Styles, Van Brown	3:50
6.	"Sure Feels Good" (vs. Ultrabeat)	Styles, Di Scala, Henry	3:25
7.	"Heartbeatz" (Styles & Breeze)	Styles & Breeze, Karen Danzig	2:46
8.	"Blow Me Away"	Styles, Breeze, Lisa Abbott	3:50
9.	"Skydivin'" (Fugitive edit)	Styles, Broomfield	3:02
10.	"You're Shining" (Styles & Breeze)	Styles & Breeze	3:22
11.	"Feel Love" (Nitelite remix)	Styles	4:09
12.	"Paradise & Dreams" (vs. Ultrabeat)	Styles, Hobbs, Van Brown	4:03
13.	"You're My Angel" (Styles & Breeze)	Ralph Fridge, Detlef Hastik, Ivo Kinkel	5:14
Total length:			46:45

== Personnel ==
- Darren Styles – producer (all tracks), vocals (disc 1 tracks 1, 5, 10, 11, 12, 13, 16 & 17, disc 2 tracks 2, 4, 9, 11 & 13)

Production

- Ultrabeat – producers (disc 1 track 4, disc 2 tracks 6 and 12)
- Hypasonic – producer (disc 1 track 6)
- SHM – producer (disc 1 track 12)
- Styles & Breeze – producers (disc 1 track 15, disc 2 tracks 7, 8, 10 & 13)
- N-Force – producers (disc 2 track 1)
- Kenny Hayes – additional producer, remixing (disc 2 tracks 2, 4, 9 & 11)

Additional musicians

- Francis Hill – vocals, production (disc 1 tracks 2 & 7)
- Lisa Abbott – vocals (disc 1 track 3, disc 2 tracks 8 & 10)
- Mike Di Scala – vocals, production (disc 1 track 4; disc 2 track 12)
- Justine Riddoch – vocals (disc 1 track 6; disc 2 track 3)
- Andrea Britton – vocals (disc 1 track 9)
- MC Whizzkid – vocals, production (disc 1 track 12)
- Wayne G – vocals (disc 1 track 14)
- Karen Danzig – vocals (disc 1 track 15; disc 2 track 7)
- Lois McConnell – vocals (disc 2 track 1)
- Junior – vocals, production (disc 2 track 5)
- Rebecca Rudd – vocals (disc 2 track 12)

Other personnel

- Iginition – design

== Chart performance ==
Chart (2008)	Peak position
UK Albums Chart	4
European Top 100 Albums	9

=== Certifications ===
Region	Certification	Certified units/sales
United Kingdom (BPI)	Gold	100,000^{^}
^{^} Shipments figures based on certification alone.

== Release history ==
Region	Date	Label	Format	Catalog
United Kingdom	16 June 2008	All Around the World, Universal Music TV	2xCD	1774381
