= Disco lights =

Disco lights may refer to:

== Music ==
- "Discolights", a song by Ultrabeat and Darren Styles.
- Discolights: The Album, a 2008 album by Ultrabeat.

== Entertainment Lighting ==
- DJ lighting
- Stage lighting
- Intelligent lighting
- Martin Light
