= Sure Feels Good (song) =

- Single cover for Sure Feels Good

Single by Ultrabeat vs Darren Styles

from the album Ultrabeat: The Album
- Released: 20 August 2007
- Recorded: 2006
- Genre: Dance, Hardcore, House, Trance
- Length: 3:28 (Radio Edit)
- Label: AATW
- Songwriter(s): Mike Di Scala, Darren Mew
- Producer(s): Ultrabeat, Darren Styles

Ultrabeat singles chronology
"Elysium (I Go Crazy)" (2006)	"Sure Feels Good" (2007)	"I Wanna Touch You" (2007)

Darren Styles singles chronology
"Save Me" (2007)	"Sure Feels Good" (2007)	"Right by Your Side" (2008)

"Sure Feels Good" is a song written and recorded by Ultrabeat and Darren Styles, released as a single in 2007. It was the first Styles/Ultrabeat collaboration since Ultrabeat covered "Pretty Green Eyes" and "Feelin' Fine" in 2003. The vocals are by Rebecca Rudd, also the singer on "Elysium (I Go Crazy)".

== Writing and recording ==
The song was originally a hardcore track, written and recorded by Styles & Re-Con with vocalist Rebecca Rudd in 2006. Rudd had previously worked with Ultrabeat and Mike Di Scala in the past, for example the vocals on "Elysium (I Go Crazy)". In 2007, the song was re-recorded with another verse added and re-produced by Ultrabeat and Darren Styles.

== Release and reception ==
The Styles & Re-Con hardcore mix first appeared on the Clubland X-Treme Hardcore 3 compilation album in 2006. In June 2007, the Ultrabeat versus Darren Styles version was released on Promo CD and Promo 12" Vinyl and the Rezonance Q remix was included on Clubland 11.

"Sure Feels Good" was released as a Download EP on 20 August 2007 and as a Maxi CD and 12" Vinyl one week later. It peaked at a chart position of #52 on the UK Singles Chart, which was considered low compared to the #8 UK Albums Chart position of Ultrabeat - The Album a few weeks later. The song was also included on Darren Styles's #4 album Skydivin' in 2008.

Also, "Sure Feels Good" won the 2007 Eurodanceweb Award for song of the year, as voted for by over 150 DJs, producers and music journalists. It was the UK entry for this award, and competed with entries from 41 European countries.

== Track listing and formats ==
Promo CD

1. Radio Edit
2. Extended Mix
3. Rezonance Q Remix
4. Soul Seekerz Remix
5. Flip & Fill Remix
6. Dancing DJs Remix
7. Lee S Remix
8. Fugitive Tamper Evident Remix
9. KB Project Remix
10. Frisco Remix
11. Alex K Remix

Promo 12" / 12" Single

1. Original Mix
2. Alex K Remix
1. Rezonance Q Remix
2. KB Project Remix

Maxi CD Single / Download EP 1

1. Radio Edit (3:28)
2. Extended Mix (6:47)
3. Soul Seekerz Mix (7:54)
4. Lee S Remix (7:01)
5. Dancing DJs Remix (5:58)
6. Fugitive Remix (3:29)
7. Flip & Fill Remix (5:18)

Download EP 2

1. Radio Edit (3:28)
2. Soul Seekerz Dub (7:57)
3. Frisco Remix (5:15)
4. Rezonance Q Remix (6:40)
5. Alex K Remix (6:29)
6. KB Project Remix (6:39)

Download EP 3

1. Styles & Re-Con Remix (6:50)
2. Radio Edit (3:28)

== Personnel ==
Ultrabeat

- Mike Di Scala – producer
- Chris Henry – producer

Additional musicians

- Darren Styles – producer, keyboards
- Rebecca Rudd – vocals

== Music video ==
The video was filmed on June 6, 2007 and it was directed by Kevin Hewitt and choreographed by Elizabeth Honan. The video stars Mike Di Scala and Chris Henry from Ultrabeat, Darren Styles, Rebecca Rudd, and Playboy model Lisa-Marie Bourke with other models as the strippers.

The story of the video show Darren Styles and Ultrabeat entering a strip club and the strippers giving them lap dances and teasing them. Rebecca Rudd is also singing in the strip club. The story shows one of the strippers photographing Mike, Chris and Darren in the strip club with Darren's mobile phone and the sending it in a picture message to one of his contacts. They are then forced to leave in a hurry after the mobile phone starts receiving an incoming call.

There is also a "late night" cut of the video, which contains a parental advisory notice because of the nudity. This version shows footage of Lisa-Marie Bourke and some of the other models nude. There is also a hardcore version of the video shown on Clubland TV, where the Styles & Re-Con hardcore mix is used instead.

== Chart performance ==
Charts (2007)	Peak Position
Scotland (OCC)	24
UK Singles (OCC)	52
