= Feel the Pressure =

Studio album by Darren Styles
- Released: 23 August 2010
- Recorded: 2008–2010
- Genre: Hardcore, dance
- Length: 97:51
- Label: All Around the World, Universal Music TV
- Producer: Darren Styles, Re-Con, Manian, United in Dance, Francis Hill, Chris Unknown, Styles & Breeze, Vince Hysse & NJ Hinton

Darren Styles chronology
Skydivin' (2008)	Feel the Pressure (2010)

Feel the Pressure is the second studio album by Darren Styles. It was released on 23 August 2010.

== Background ==
Professional ratings
Review scores
Source	Rating
AllMusic	2/5 stars

Styles' previous album Skydivin' (2008) was his début album as a solo artist and sold well achieving a Gold certification. Recording for Feel the Pressure followed on from the release of the first album and Styles' main collaborator was Re-Con who co-wrote and produced six songs on the album. Other producers included Manian, Chris Unknown and frequent collaborator Mark Breeze.

The album was released on All Around the World records on 23 August 2010 and reached a peak of No 23 on the UK Albums Chart.

== Track listing ==
Disc 1
No.	Title	Writer(s)	Length
1.	"Sound Without a Name"	Darren Styles, Mike Di Scala, Paul Newton, Daniel Sherman	3:47
2.	"Holding On"	Styles	4:12
3.	"Take You Down"	Styles, Di Scala, Alexander Perls, Kelly Barnes	3:05
4.	"Outta My Head" (with Manian)	Styles, Manuel Reuter, Yann Peifer	4:05
5.	"Feel the Pressure"	Styles	3:20
6.	"Days Like These" (feat. Lisa Abbott)	Styles, Lisa Abbott	3:44
7.	"Raining Down"	Styles, Di Scala	4:41
8.	"Like a Bitch"	Styles, Di Scala, Perls, Barnes	4:05
9.	"Pandora"	Styles	4:08
10.	"Universe"	Styles	4:38
11.	"Open Your Eyes" (feat. Mia J)	Styles, Sherman	4:14
12.	"Take Me Away"	Anonymous	3:42
13.	"Light Up the Sky" (acoustic mix)	Styles, Francis Hill	3:39
Total length:			51:20

Disc 2
No.	Title	Writer(s)	Length
1.	"Breathe Again"	Styles, Pete Kirtley	3:06
2.	"Rock Me Out"	Styles, Perls, Barnes	3:29
3.	"Bassline Road"	Styles	4:03
4.	"Pacific Sun"	Styles, Paul Hobbs, Leon Van Brown, Di Scala	3:18
5.	"Shining Star" (feat. Molly)	Styles, Chris Sargent, Dave Hyde, Keith Ryder	4:03
6.	"Now or Never"	Styles, Sargent	3:39
7.	"Symphonic" (feat. Kirsty Anderson)	Styles, Di Scala	5:05
8.	"Amigos"	Alex Christensen, Peter Könemann	3:57
9.	"Sorry"	Styles	3:59
10.	"Silver Water"	Vince Nysse, NJ Hinton, Styles	3:26
11.	"Higher Ground"	Styles	4:34
12.	"Air"	Styles	3:52
Total length:			46:31

== Personnel ==
- Darren Styles – vocals, producer (all tracks except disc 2 track 10), remixing (disc 1 track 12, disc 2 track 10)

Production

- Re-Con – producer (disc 1 tracks 1, 3, 7 & 8, disc 2 tracks 4 & 7)
- Manian – producer (disc 1 track 4)
- United in Dance – producer (disc 1 track 12)
- Francis Hill – producer (disc 1 track 13)
- Chris Unknown – producer (disc 2 tracks 5 & 6)
- Styles & Breeze – producer (disc 2 track 8)
- Vince Nysse & NJ Hinton – producer (disc 2 track 10)

Additional musicians

- Kelly Barnes – vocals (disc 1 tracks 3 & 8, disc 2 track 2)
- Lisa Abbott – vocals (disc 1 track 6)
- Mia J – vocals (disc 1 track 11)
- Molly – vocals (disc 2 track 5)
- Kirsty Anderson – vocals (disc 2 track 7)
- Jenna Lee – vocals (disc 2 track 8)
- Pascale – vocals (disc 2 track 10)
- Mike Di Scala – backing vocals (disc 1 tracks 1 & 7)
- Francis Hill – guitar (disc 1 track 13, disc 2 track 11)

Other personnel

- Engine – artwork
- Ian McManus – photography

== Chart performance ==
Chart (2010)	Peak position
UK Albums Chart	23
UK Dance Albums Chart	4

== Release history ==
Region	Date	Label	Format	Catalog
United Kingdom	23 August 2010	All Around the World, Universal Music TV	2xCD	GLOBECD89
