= Pacific Sun (song) =

Song by Force & Styles featuring Junior
- Released: 1997
- Recorded: 1997; UK Dance Studios, Clacton-on-Sea
- Genre: Happy hardcore
- Length: 7:23
- Label: UK Dance
- Songwriters: Paul Hobbs, Darren Mew, Leon Van Brown
- Producers: Force & Styles

"Pacific Sun" is a song originally written and recorded by Force & Styles featuring Junior. It was originally released on white label in 1997 and appeared on their greatest hits album Heart of Gold (2000). The song has also been covered and updated numerous times with other versions such as an updated version in 2004 featuring Flip & Fill, a cover by Ultrabeat in 2007, and another updated version in 2010 with Styles on lead vocals instead of Junior.

== Original version ==
The original version of "Pacific Sun" is a happy hardcore song with vocals by Junior. The song was written and recorded by the three at Force & Styles' UK Dance Studios in Clacton-on-Sea, Essex in 1997. "Pacific Sun" was pressed as a one-sided white label record their own label UK Dance Records in 1997. It was also re-released as a b-side to "Field of Dreams" later in 2001. Hardcore producers, Sy & Unknown, released their remix of the song in 2006, on their own label, Quosh Records.

List of remixes

- "Pacific Sun" – 7:23
- "Pacific Sun" (Sy & Unknown remix) – 5:15

== Cover versions ==
=== 2004 version featuring Flip & Fill ===
In 2004, producers Flip & Fill remixed the track with re-recorded vocals by Junior, who had also written new verses for the song. The updated version, titled "Pacific Sun (Lullaby)", was released by All Around the World on 12" promo and the song appeared on the Clubland 6 compilation album. The song is expected to appear on Flip & Fill's second album, which is yet to be released.

List of remixes

- "Pacific Sun (Lullaby)" (club mix)
- "Pacific Sun (Lullaby)" (Cheeky Trax remix)
- "Pacific Sun (Lullaby)" (Styles & Breeze remix)

=== Ultrabeat version ===
Liverpool producers, Ultrabeat, also signed to the All Around the World record label, had recorded a cover of Force & Styles' original "Pacific Sun". In 2007, the song was released as a bonus track on Ultrabeat: The Album.

=== 2010 version ===
Around 2009, a new updated version was recorded for Styles' second studio album Feel the Pressure (2010), with Styles providing lead vocals instead of Junior, and contained an extra verse. It was first performed live during the Darren Styles and Ultrabeat tour in 2009, and was also included on the compilation album Hardcore Til I Die 3 (2010).
