= Heartbeatz =

2005 single by Styles & Breeze

Single by Styles & Breeze featuring Karen Danzig
- Released: 28 February 2005
- Length: 2:46
- Label: All Around the World
- Songwriters: Styles & Breeze, Karen Danzig
- Producers: Styles & Breeze

Darren Styles singles chronology
"You're Shining" (2004)	"Heartbeatz" (2005)	"Save Me" (2006)

Mark Breeze singles chronology
"You're Shining" (2004)	"Heartbeatz" (2005)

"Heartbeatz" is a song performed by UK duo Styles & Breeze featuring Karen Danzig. It became the duo's second top-20 hit in Finland and the United Kingdom.

== Chart performance ==
In Finland, the song debuted at number 16 but only spent one week in the top 20. In Ireland, it debuted at number 38 and spent one week in the top 50. On the UK Singles Chart, it debuted at number 16, then dropped to number 36 the following week, number 51 on its third week, then number 68 on its final week on the chart.

== Music video ==
The music video features Styles & Breeze DJing against a flashy black background, and Karen lying on a red heart-shaped bed and alternating scenes of her with other dancers, dressed in "sexy nurse" outfits.

== Charts ==
Chart (2005)	Peak position
Finland (Suomen virallinen lista)	16
Ireland (IRMA)	38
Ireland Dance (IRMA)	9
Scottish Singles Sales (Official Charts)	11
UK Singles (Official Charts)	16
UK Dance (Official Charts)	16
