= Save Me (Darren Styles song) =

Single by Darren Styles

from the album Skydivin'
- Released: 19 March 2007
- Recorded: 2006
- Genre: Dance, Happy Hardcore
- Length: 3:54
- Label: AATW
- Songwriter: Darren Styles
- Producer: Darren Styles

Darren Styles singles chronology
"Heartbeatz" (2005)	"Save Me" (2007)	"Sure Feels Good" (2007)

"Save Me" is a single by British DJ Darren Styles, the third single released from his album Skydivin', it was released in 2006. The single reached #70 on the UK Singles Chart.

== Track listing ==
CD Single / Download

1. Original Hardcore Edit (3:54)
2. Nitelite Edit (3:51)
3. Original Hardcore Mix (7:40)
4. Club Mix (7:44)
5. CJ Stone Remix (6:49)
6. Hypasonic Remix (6:57)

CD Promo

1. Club Mix (7:46)
2. CJ Stone Remix (6:49)
3. Original Hardcore Version (7:45)
4. Flip & Fill Mix (6:22)
5. Friday Night Posse Mix (7:25)
6. Kenny Hayes Remix (7:34)
7. Technikal Remix (7:55)
8. Hypasonic Remix (6:58)
9. Kenny Hayes Nitelite Mix (5:16)

12" Promo

1. Alex K Remix (7:37)
2. Hypasonic Remix (6:58)

== Music video ==
The music video for "Save Me" was filmed in Spain, using high wires to show Darren jumping off a tall building. There are two versions of the video, one for the Hardcore mix and another for the Nitelite edit. In the Hardcore Mix Darren jumps from a building whilst dreaming of a blonde girl named Dawn McGovern from Saltdean, near Brighton in East Sussex. At the end of the Nitelite video he is saved by the girl. The song contains the famous chorus "'Cause I want you to save me, just please save me, save me."

== Personnel ==
- Written By, Producer, Vocals - Darren Styles
- Backing Vocals - Mike Di Scala
- Guitar - Francis Hill
- Additional Producer, Remix (Track 2 CDS) - Kenny Hayes at the AATW Studios, UK
- Record Label - AATW
- Publisher - Paul Rodriguez Music Ltd
- Marketing - Absolute Marketing and Distribution
- Distribution - Universal

== Charts ==
Charts (2007)	Peak position
UK Singles (OCC)	70

== Certifications ==
Region	Certification	Certified units/sales
United Kingdom (BPI)	Silver	200,000^{‡}
^{‡} Sales+streaming figures based on certification alone.
