= The Weekend Has Landed =

Studio album by Ultrabeat
- Released: 26 October 2009
- Recorded: 2007–2009
- Studio: MDS Studios
- Genre: Dance
- Label: All Around the World, Universal Music TV
- Producer: Ultrabeat, Darren Styles

Ultrabeat chronology
Ultrabeat: The Album (2007)	The Weekend Has Landed (2009)

Singles from The Weekend Has Landed
- 1. "Discolights" Released: June 23, 2008; 2. "Never Ever" Released: 2008; 3. "Starry Eyed Girl" Released: July 2009; 4. "Use Somebody" Released: November 2009

The Weekend Has Landed is the second studio album by Ultrabeat.

== Release ==
Professional ratings
Review scores
Source	Rating
AllMusic	2/5 stars

A limited number of copies of the album were released on December 1, 2008, under the title of Discolights: The Album however due to distribution problems and the album leaking on to file sharing websites the release date was eventually pushed back until October 26, 2009. The album was renamed The Weekend Has Landed and had a slightly altered track listing from the original Discolights album.

== Track listing ==
Disc 1: CD
No.	Title	Writer(s)	Length
1.	"Intro"	Mike Di Scala, Chris Henry	1:08
2.	"Discolights" (vs. Darren Styles)	Di Scala, Henry, Darren Mew	2:38
3.	"Use Somebody"	Caleb Followill, Nathan Followill, Jared Followill, Matthew Followill	2:43
4.	"Starry Eyed Girl"	Di Scala, Henry	2:31
5.	"Never Ever"	Di Scala, Henry	2:55
6.	"You and I"	Di Scala, Henry	3:22
7.	"Simply the Way"	Di Scala, Henry	2:57
8.	"So Many Times"	Di Scala, Henry	3:22
9.	"Don't Wanna Let Go" (vs. Darren Styles)	Di Scala, Henry, Mew	2:43
10.	"Pocketful of Love"	Di Scala, Henry, Gordon May	2:41
11.	"One in a Million"	Di Scala, Henry	3:21
12.	"Angel"	Di Scala, Henry	3:03
13.	"Saving Grace"	Jarkko Pietiläinen, Alex James, Kerin Smith, Andy Gardner, Lee Rous	3:03
14.	"Hey You"	Di Scala, Henry	2:16
15.	"Alright"	Di Scala, Henry	3:00
16.	"Wonderland"	Di Scala, Henry	2:57
17.	"The Stalker"	Di Scala, Henry	3:12
18.	"It's My Life"	Di Scala, Henry	3:22

Disc 2: DVD
No.	Title	Length
1.	"Pretty Green Eyes" (video)	3:21
2.	"Feelin' Fine" (video)	3:01
3.	"Better than Life" (video)	3:12
4.	"Feel It with Me" (video)	3:08
5.	"Sure Feels Good" (video)	3:27
6.	"Elysium (I Go Crazy)" (video)	3:18
7.	"I Wanna Touch You" (video)	2:53
8.	"Discolights" (video)	2:42
9.	"Never Ever" (video)	3:04
10.	"The Stalker" (video)	3:14
11.	"Starry Eyed Girl" (video)	2:34
12.	"Don't Wanna Let Go" (video)	2:59
13.	"Use Somebody" (video)	2:47
14.	"Discolights" (live at Clubland 2)	3:30
15.	"Starry Eyed Girl" (live at Clubland 2)	2:21
16.	"Elysium (I Go Crazy)/I Wanna Touch You/Sure Feels Good" (live at Clubland 2)	5:02
17.	"Feelin' Fine" (live at Clubland 2)	1:02
18.	"Never Ever" (live at Clubland 2)	2:44
19.	"Pretty Green Eyes" (live at Clubland 2)	4:13

Album cover for Discolights: The Album released on 1 December 2008

Cut tracks

Four songs originally included on Discolights: The Album in 2008 that were removed from the final track list:

- "She's Like the Wind" (Patrick Swayze, Stacey Widelitz) – 2:41
- "Runaway" (Di Scala, Henry) – 2:51
- "What Will It Take?" (Di Scala, Henry, Wayne Donnelly) – 3:18
- "Right Here Waiting" (Richard Marx) – 2:37

== Personnel ==
Ultrabeat

- Mike Di Scala – producer, vocals
- Chris Henry – producer

Production

- Darren Styles – producer (on tracks 2 & 9)

Additional musicians

- Rebecca Rudd – vocals (on tracks 6, 11, 16 & 17)
- MC Whizzkid – vocals (on tracks 1 & 10)
- MC Cyanide – vocals (on tracks 12 & 14)

Other personnel

- Ignition Creative Business Solutions – design
- Ian McManus – photography

== Release history ==
Region	Date	Label	Format	Catalog
United Kingdom	26 October 2009	All Around the World, Universal Music TV	CD	2724190

== Chart performance ==
Chart	Peak Position
UK Albums Chart	29

== Certifications ==
Region	Certification	Certified units/sales
United Kingdom (BPI)	Silver	60,000^{‡}
^{‡} Sales+streaming figures based on certification alone.
