= Pacific Sun =

Pacific Sun may refer to:

- Pacific Sun (airline), a regional airline based in Fiji
- Pacific Sun (newspaper), a weekly newspaper in California
- Pacific Sun (ship), former name of a holiday class cruise ship now renamed Henna
- Pacific Sun (song), a single by Force & Styles
