= Discolights =

- Single cover for "Discolights"

Single by Ultrabeat vs Darren Styles

from the album The Weekend Has Landed and Skydivin'
- Released: 23 June 2008
- Recorded: 2008
- Genre: Dance, hardcore, jumpstyle
- Length: 2:46 (radio edit); 3:30 (Skydivin'/Hardcore Version)
- Label: All Around the World
- Songwriters: Mike Di Scala, Chris Henry, Darren Styles
- Producers: Ultrabeat, Darren Styles

Ultrabeat singles chronology
"I Wanna Touch You" (2008)	"Discolights" (2008)	"Never Ever" (2008)

Darren Styles singles chronology
"Right By Your Side" (2008)	"Discolights" (2008)	"Girls Like You" (2008)

"Discolights" is a song written and produced by Ultrabeat and Darren Styles, taken from Styles' debut solo album, Skydivin' and Ultrabeat's second album The Weekend Has Landed. The song combines the hardcore and commercial styles of the two artists. It was released on 23 June 2008 as a digital download; a physical single was released on 28 July 2008.

== Track listing ==
CD promo / CD single / download

1. Radio Edit – (2:46)
2. Extended Mix – (5:13)
3. Darren Styles Hardcore Mix – (3:31)
4. Hypasonic Remix – (6:01)
5. Scooter Remix – (6:06)
6. Bassfreakerz Remix – (5:50)
7. Riffs & Rays Remix – (7:49)

12" promo

1. Original Mix
2. Darren Styles Hardcore Remix
1. Hypasonic Remix
2. Bassfreakerz Remix

== Personnel ==
Ultrabeat

- Mike Di Scala – vocals, producer
- Chris Henry – producer

Darren Styles

- Darren Styles – producer

== Music video ==
The music video, directed by Paul Boyd and produced by Adrian Fulle, was filmed in Los Angeles on 28 April 2008. It shows two robots coming to life and people dancing in a nightclub where the video was shot. Starring Ultrabeat and Darren Styles, the video also shows Mike Di Scala singing the lyrics to the song on the dancefloor with Chris Henry and Darren Styles DJing. The main focus of the video, however, is the two robots dancing under the discolights.

== Chart performance ==
On June 29, 2008, the song entered the UK Singles Chart at No. 110 on downloads alone, eventually peaking at No. 23.

Chart (2008)	Peak Position
Ireland (IRMA)	28
Scotland (OCC)	4
UK Singles (OCC)	23
