= Neocortex (disambiguation) =

The neocortex is a part of the mammalian brain.

Neocortex may refer to:

- Doctor Neo Cortex, a video game character from the Crash Bandicoot series
- Neo Cortex, a trance music act featured on the compilation album Clubland X-Treme 2
