= Right by Your Side (N-Force and Darren Styles song) =

"Right By Your Side"
- Single cover for Right By Your Side

Single by N-Force v Darren Styles

from the album Skydivin'
- Released: 9 June 2008
- Recorded: 2008
- Genre: Dance
- Length: 3:35 (Video Edit); 3:22 (Album Version)
- Label: AATW
- Songwriters: Darren Styles, Chris Henry, Jochen Gradwohl
- Producers: N-Force, Darren Styles

Darren Styles singles chronology
"Sure Feels Good" (2007)	"Right By Your Side" (2008)	"Discolights" (2008)

N-Force singles chronology
"Right By Your Side" (2008)	"All My Life (JoJo & K-Ci Cover)" (2008)

"Right By Your Side" is a song written and produced by N-Force and Darren Styles. The vocals are sung by Lois McConnell from N-Force and it was released on 9 June 2008 (the same month as Darren Styles and Ultrabeat released Discolights which peaked 23 in the UK.

== Track listing ==
CD Single / Download

1. Radio Edit (3:23)
2. Extended Mix (5:22)
3. ReCon Remix (5:54)
4. Ultrabeat Remix (6:29)
5. Styles & Breeze Remix (5:47)
6. Riffs & Rays Remix (8:00)

Download

1. Radio Edit (3:23)
2. ReCon Edit (2:50)
3. Riffs & Rays Radio Edit (3:10)
4. Hypasonic Remix (6:33)
5. KB Project Remix (6:20)
6. JC Remix (5:50)
7. Fugitive's Side On Mix (5:05)

12" Promo

1. Original Mix
2. Ultrabeat Remix
3. Hypasonic Remix
4. KB Project Remix
5. Re-Con Remix

CD Promo

1. Radio Edit
2. Extended Mix
3. Ultrabeat Remix
4. Hypasonic Remix
5. Riffs & Rays Remix
6. KB Project Remix
7. Fugitive's Side On Remix
8. JC Remix
9. Riffs & Rays Radio Edit

== Music video ==
The music video is mainly based in a street when lead singer Lois McConnell looks sad and also dances in front of lights. The video also features Darren Styles DJing in the background while Lois dances in the foreground.

== Charts ==
On 29 June 2008 the song entered the UK Singles Chart at #87 on downloads alone and rose to #77 the following the physical release. It also managed to peak #46 in Germany and #8 on the UK Dance Chart

Chart (2008)	Peak position
UK Singles Chart (Official Charts Company)	77
UK Dance Chart (Official Charts Company)	8
Germany (Media Control Charts)	46
