= Feelin' Fine =

1998 single by Unique

Single by Force & Styles (labelled as Unique)
- B-side: "Distant Skies"
- Released: 27 July 1998
- Genre: Happy hardcore
- Length: 6:49
- Label: UK Dance
- Songwriter: Darren Mew
- Producers: Darren Mew, Paul Hobbs

"Feelin' Fine" is a song written by Darren Mew with additional production from Paul Hobbs and originally released as a happy hardcore song in 1998 under the alias Unique. In 2003, Ultrabeat released a cover of the song with newly added lyrics as their second single; it reached number 12 on the UK Singles Chart.

== Original version ==
Darren Styles released this song under the alias Unique in 1998. It was a happy hardcore song and it was first released as a 12-inch record on UK Dance with the B-side "Distant Skies". An edit with DJ Force credited on it was later released as the B-side to "Higher Ground". It is one of the earliest songs where Styles provided vocals, and it also appeared on some hardcore compilation albums.

=== Track listing ===
12-inch single

1. "Feelin' Fine" – 6:49
2. "Distant Skies" – 7:22

=== Personnel ===
- Darren Styles – vocals, producer
- Paul Hobbs (DJ Force) - producer
- Melissa – vocals (on "Distant Skies")

== Ultrabeat version ==
"Feelin' Fine"

Single by Ultrabeat
- Released: 15 December 2003
- Genre: Hardcore
- Length: 3:01 (radio edit)
- Label: All Around the World
- Songwriter: Darren Mew
- Producer: Ultrabeat

Ultrabeat singles chronology
"Pretty Green Eyes" (2003)	"Feelin' Fine" (2003)	"Better than Life" (2004)

"Feelin' Fine" was the second single released by British electronic music group Ultrabeat. It peaked at number 12 on the UK Singles Chart. The track was available on CD and 12-inch vinyl formats. Remixes for the song were provided by CJ Stone, KB Project, Flip & Fill, Scott Brown, and by the writer and vocalist of the song, Darren Styles.

=== Track listings ===
CD single 1

1. "Feelin' Fine" (radio edit) – 3:01
2. "Feelin' Fine" (CJ Stone remix) – 7:41
3. "Feelin' Fine" (extended mix) – 7:29
4. "Feelin' Fine" (KB Project remix) – 5:54
5. "Feelin' Fine" (Darren Styles remix) – 7:07
6. "Feelin' Fine" (Flip & Fill remix) – 6:52

CD single 2

1. "Feelin' Fine" – 3:01
2. "Pretty Green Eyes (radio edit) – 3:22

12-inch single

1. "Feelin' Fine" (extended mix) – 7:29
2. "Feelin' Fine" (CJ Stone remix) – 7:41
3. "Feelin' Fine" (Darren Styles remix) – 7:07

Download EP

1. "Feelin' Fine" (radio edit) – 3:01
2. "Feelin' Fine" (CJ Stone edit) – 2:26
3. "Feelin' Fine" (Scott Brown remix) – 5:56
4. "Feelin' Fine" (Darren Styles remix) – 7:07
5. "Feelin' Fine" (KB Project remix) – 5:54
6. "Feelin' Fine" (extended mix) – 7:29
7. "Feelin' Fine" (CJ Stone remix) – 7:41
8. "Feelin' Fine" (Flip & Fill remix) – 6:55

=== Personnel ===
Ultrabeat

- Mike Di Scala – vocals, producer
- Ian Redman – producer
- Chris Henry – producer

Other personnel

- Ignition – design

=== Charts ===
==== Weekly charts ====
Chart (2003–2004)	Peak position
Ireland (IRMA)	26
Ireland Dance (IRMA)	1
Netherlands (Dutch Top 40)	26
Netherlands (Single Top 100)	35
Scottish Singles Sales (Official Charts)	8
UK Singles (Official Charts)	12
UK Dance (Official Charts)	2

==== Year-end charts ====
Chart (2004)	Position
UK Singles (OCC)	124

=== Certifications ===
Certifications for "Feelin' Fine"
Region	Certification	Certified units/sales
United Kingdom (BPI) Sales since 2005	Silver	200,000^{‡}
^{‡} Sales+streaming figures based on certification alone.
