= Clubland X-Treme Hardcore =

Compilation album series

Compilation album by various artists
- Released: 2003–2018
- Genres: Electronica, Hardcore, Happy Hardcore
- Labels: Universal Music TV, All Around the World
- Compilers: Darren Styles, Breeze, Hixxy, Gammer, Re-Con

Clubland X-Treme Hardcore is a series of compilation albums from Clubland, released by Universal Music TV and AATW, that was initiated by DJ producers Hixxy and Styles. The series has been credited as a turning point in the popularity of the hardcore music scene.

== Series overview ==
Title	Mixed by	Release date	Catalog #	Peak chart positions		Certifications
Title	Mixed by	Release date	Catalog #	UK Comp	UK Dance	Certifications
Clubland X-Treme		17 April 2003		2	–	UK: Gold
Clubland X-Treme 2		19 April 2004		2	–	UK: Silver
Clubland X-Treme Hardcore	Darren Styles, Breeze, Hixxy	2 May 2005	982 969-6	1	3	UK: Gold
Clubland X-Treme Hardcore 2	Darren Styles, Breeze, Hixxy	12 March 2006	983 786-6	1	2	UK: Gold
Clubland X-Treme Hardcore 3	Darren Styles, Breeze, Hixxy	11 December 2006	172 019-7	11	10	UK: Gold
Clubland X-Treme Hardcore 4	Darren Styles, Breeze, Hixxy	3 December 2007	175 580-9	7	7	UK: Gold
Clubland X-Treme Hardcore 5	Darren Styles, Breeze, Hixxy	8 December 2008	531 503-9	15	–	UK: Silver
Clubland X-Treme Hardcore 6	Darren Styles, Breeze, Hixxy	7 December 2009	532 395-4	19	–	
Clubland X-Treme Hardcore 7	Darren Styles, Breeze, Hixxy	27 December 2010	533 230-7	4	7	
Clubland X-Treme Hardcore 8	Darren Styles, Breeze, Re-Con & Hixxy	16 January 2012		4	6	
Clubland X-Treme Hardcore 9	Darren Styles, Breeze, Hixxy & Gammer	18 March 2013		3	6	
100% Clubland X-Treme		23 March 2018		2	1	UK: Silver

== Clubland X-Treme ==
- Disc 1
1. Scooter – Weekend! 4:49
2. Drunkenmunky – E 2:39
3. Porn Kings vs. Flip & Fill – Shake Ya Shimmy 3:22
4. Divine Inspiration – The Way (Put Your Hand in My Hand) (Aldrich & Glennon Remix) 3:34
5. Deja-Vu – Face Down Ass Up 3:44
6. Dickheadz – Suck My Dick! 4:00
7. Cisco Kid – Pizzaman 4:12
8. DJ Aligator Project – Lollipop (X-Rated Mix) 4:12
9. The System – If You Leave Me Now (Aldrich & Glennon Remix) 5:24
10. The Sax Brothers – Careless Whisper (South East Players Remix) 4:21
11. Plummet – Damaged (Arctica Remix) 3:55
12. Head Horny's – My Hero 2:40
13. Hi-Flyerz – Pumpanola 2:53
14. Friday Night Posse – Kiss This (Voodoo & Serano Mix) 3:27
15. Eyeopener – Open Your Eyes (Scott Brown Remix) 3:20
16. Public Domain – Operation Blade 5:24
17. Voodoo & Serano – Blood is Pumpin 4:03
18. Dallas Superstars – Helium (FNP Remix) 5:17
19. Special D. – Come with Me (Groove Coverage Remix) 2:59
- Disc 2
1. Flip & Fill – Field of Dreams (Q-Tex Mix) 3:38
2. Voodoo & Serano – Overload (Friday Night Posse Remix) 4:42
3. Porn Kings – Rock to the Rhythm 4:19
4. Uproar – The Roof is on Fire 4:22
5. Q-Tex – Power of Love 3:20
6. N-Trance – Set You Free (Voodoo & Serano Remix) 4:04
7. Flip & Fill – Shooting Star (Stimulant DJs Remix) 4:12
8. DJs @ Work – Time to Wonder (Brooklyn Bounce Remix) 3:16
9. Artemesia – Bits & Pieces 4:01
10. Starsplash – Wonderful Days 3:30
11. London Fiesta – Can You Feel It 5:20
12. Soraya – When You're Gone (Monsoon & Dreamwurx Mix) 3:55
13. Head Horny's vs. Miguel Serna* – Something Real (Energy Mix) 5:32
14. Future Breeze – Temple of Dreams 3:50
15. Piano Pirates – Make It on My Own 3:42
16. Jan Wayne – Total Eclipse of The Heart (Pez Tellett vs Northstarz Remix) 2:49
17. 56K – Save a Prayer (Steve Murano Remix) 5:20
18. BK – Revolution 4:48
19. Slipmatt – Space (Miami Mix) 2:42

== Clubland X-Treme 2 ==
- Disc 1
1. Special D - Come with Me (Central Seven v Tricky P Remix) 5:30
2. Chaah – Funkiness of You (FNP Remix) 4:14
3. Neo Cortex – Elements (KB Project Remix) 3:55
4. LMC vs U2 – Take Me to the Clouds Above (Lee S Remix) 2:51
5. Narcotic Thrust – I Like It (Sinewave Surfers 2am Remix) 4:38
6. Rezidents* – Popcorn (Club Mix) 3:19
7. Rezonance Q – Sweetheart (FNP Remix) 3:38
8. Styles & Breeze – You're Shining (Dark Mix) 3:55
9. Clear Vu – I Adore (CJ Stone Remix) 3:16
10. Awesome 3 vs. FNP* – Don't Go 4:13
11. N-Trance – I'm in Heaven (Steve Murano Remix) 3:55
12. Gladiator feat. Izzy – Now We are Free (B'Jammin Remix) 3:57
13. Styles & Breeze feat. Karen Danzig – Heartbeatz (Hixxy Mix) 4:13
14. Sosumi – Feel the Tribute (Club Mix) 4:09
15. Big Fish – Somebody Real 4:26
16. Double Dutch – Bring the Noise (Original Mix) 5:17
17. Maximum Spell – Tell Me Why 4:23
18. XTM – Give Me Your Love (KB Project Mix) 3:16
19. Ultrabeat – Pretty Green Eyes (DJ Lhasa Remix) 4:16
- Disc 2
1. Scooter – Jigga Jigga! (Flip & Fill Remix) 3:05
2. Uproar – Brass Disc (KB Project Remix) 3:44
3. Friday Night Posse – Extreme (Club Mix) 4:15
4. Flip & Fill feat. Karen Parry – Discoland (Cheeky Trax Remix) 2:37
5. Superstars of Bounce – Beat Goes Boom 3:11
6. Voodoo & Serano – This is Entertainment (Club Mix) 3:06
7. Ultrabeat – Feelin' Fine (Scott Brown Remix) 4:22
8. Plummet – Cherish the Day (Hardknock Remix) 2:50
9. Tube & Berger – Straight Ahead (Hardcore Remix) 3:55
10. Royal Gigolos – California Dreamin' (KB Project Mix) 3:42
11. Jonestown – Sweet Thang (FNP Remix) 3:19
12. Northstarz pts. Neon 8 – What's Up 2:52
13. Kelly Llorenna – This Time I Know It's for Real (KB Project Mix) 3:57
14. Ron Van Den Beuken – Keep on Movin' (Timeless) (Ratty Remix) 4:08
15. Tiffany Gayle – Do You Wanna Dance? 3:16
16. FFD – Ecstasy 3:31
17. Quango & Zunie – Music is My Life 4:35
18. Fatman Scoop feat. the Crooklyn Clan – Be Faithful (Kuta Remix) 4:20
19. Khia – My Neck, My Back (Lick It) (FNP Remix) 4:14

== Clubland X-Treme Hardcore ==
Clubland X-Treme Hardcore

Compilation album by various artists
- Released: 2 May 2005
- Genre: Hardcore
- Labels: Universal Music TV, All Around the World
- Compilers: Darren Styles, Breeze, Hixxy

Clubland X-Treme Hardcore chronology
Clubland X-Treme Hardcore (2005)	Clubland X-Treme Hardcore 2 (2006)

- Disc 1: Mixed by Darren Styles
1. Darren Styles feat. Lisa Abbott - Getting Better
2. Dougal & Gammer - Make Some Noise
3. System F - Cry (Re-Con Remix)
4. Styles & Breeze - You're My Angel (Scott Brown Remix)
5. United in Dance feat. Lisa Marie - Still the One (Re-Con Remix)
6. Darren Styles - Drop Zone
7. Bimbo Jones - Come Fly with Me (Re-Con Remix)
8. Hixxy & Styles - The Theme
9. Styles & Breeze - Slide Away
10. Flip & Fill feat. Junior - Pacific Sun (Styles & Breeze Remix)
11. Hixxy & UFO - Welcome (05 Mix)
12. Darren Styles feat. Daniel Sherman - Sound Without a Name
13. Apollo - Dance (Re-Con Remix)
14. Sy & Unknown - Do We Have to Say Goodbye (Styles & Breeze Remix)
15. United in Dance feat. Jenna - Shining Down
16. Dark Monks - Insane (Re-Con Remix)
17. Impact & Resist - Sunrise (Styles & Breeze Remix)
- Disc 2: Mixed by Breeze
1. Dougal & Gammer - X-Treme (Exclusive Clubland Remix)
2. Styles & Breeze feat. Karen Danzig - Heartbeatz (Re-Con Remix)
3. Styles & Breeze - Thug Boy
4. Neo Cortex - Elements (Styles & Breeze Remix)
5. Love Decade - So Real (Styles & Breeze Remix)
6. Scott Brown - Neck Breaker (Dougal & Gammer Remix)
7. Tina Cousins - Hymn (Gammer & G-Spencer Remix)
8. Gammer & G-Spencer - LS Drive
9. Re-Con - Right Here Right Now
10. Styles & Breeze - The Beat Kicks (Gammer Remix)
11. Darren Styles - Cuttin' Deep (VIP)
12. Breeze - Let's Fly (Deejaybee & Sketchy Remix)
13. Jess & Spenno - Find Your Way (Styles & Breeze Remix)
14. The Disco Brothers feat. Andrea Britton - Time Still Drifts Away (Styles & Breeze Remix)
15. Scott Brown & Cat Knight - All About You (Styles & Breeze Remix)
16. Lisa Abbott - Blow Me Away (Styles & Breeze Remix)
17. Eyeopener - 6 Days (Styles & Breeze Remix)
18. Scott Brown & DMO - Fade Away
- Disc 3: Mixed by Hixxy
1. Hixxy - Music is My First Love (Intro)
2. N-Trance - Set You Free (Hixxy Remix)
3. Special D - Come with Me (Hixxy Remix)
4. Visa - Fly Away (Hixxy Remix)
5. Yum Yi feat. Becki Judge - Tantric (Alternative Mix)
6. Hixxy & Whizzkid - End of Time (Hixxy Intro Mix)
7. Brooklyn Bounce - Bass, Beats & Melody (Hixxy Remix)
8. Ultrabeat - Better Than Life (Hixxy Remix)
9. Hixxy - Creatures of the Night (Dougal & Gammer Remix)
10. Praga Khan - Injected with a Poison (Hixxy Remix)
11. Yum Yi feat. Becki Judge - Watching, Waiting
12. Hixxy - Rok the Dance Floor (Dub Mix)
13. N-Trance - Forever (Hixxy Remix)
14. Hixxy feat. MC Kenetik - Become One
15. Ultrabeat - Pretty Green Eyes (Hixxy Remix)
16. Styles & Breeze - You're Shining (Hixxy Remix)

== Clubland X-Treme Hardcore 2 ==
Clubland X-Treme Hardcore 2

Compilation album by various artists
- Released: 12 March 2006
- Genre: Hardcore
- Labels: Universal Music TV, All Around the World
- Compilers: Darren Styles, Breeze, Hixxy

Clubland X-Treme Hardcore chronology
Clubland X-Treme Hardcore (2005)	Clubland X-Treme Hardcore 2 (2006)	Clubland X-Treme Hardcore 3 (2006)

- Disc 1: Mixed by Darren Styles
1. Darren Styles - Jealous
2. Ultrabeat & Scott Brown - Elysium (I Go Crazy) (Styles & Breeze Remix)
3. Ian Van Dahl - Inspiration (Sy & Unknown Remix)
4. Darren Styles feat. Junior - I Need You
5. United in Dance - Rocking with the Best
6. Clear Vu - Never Too Late (Re-Con Remix)
7. Darren Styles - Save Me
8. Re-Con - Pull Over (Re-Edit)
9. Sy & Unknown feat. Lou Lou - U R My Phantasy (Darren Styles Remix)
10. Styles & Breeze feat. Whizzkid - Nightmare
11. Dougal & Gammer feat. Lisa Marie - How Did I Get Here
12. Route 1 feat. Jenny Frost - Crash Landing (Darren Styles Remix)
13. Hixxy & Styles feat. Lou Lou - Happiness
14. Trinity - Like the Sun (Sy & Unknown Remix)
15. Darren Styles - Skydivin' 06
16. Darren Styles & Re-Con - Where Do We Go
17. Flip & Fill feat. Kelly Llorenna - True Love Never Dies (Darren Styles Remix)
- Disc 2: Mixed by Breeze
1. Styles & Breeze - You're My Angel (Midnight Mix)
2. Scooter - Nessaja (Breeze Remix)
3. Styles & Breeze feat. Karen Danzig - I Will Be (Stevie B Remix)
4. Styles & Breeze feat. MC Storm - Dark Like Vader (Clubland Edit)
5. Sy & Unknown feat. Lou Lou - Believe in Me (Breeze Remix)
6. Styles & Breeze - You're Shining (Squad-E Remix)
7. Audioscape - Walk Away (Styles & Breeze Remix)
8. Re-Con & Squad-E - 1000 Kisses
9. Styles & Breeze - Love Garden
10. UFO & MC Marley - Connections 06
11. Darren Styles feat. Lisa Abbott - Getting Better (Squad-E Remix)
12. Breeze - Hardcore DJ
13. Uplift & Euphony feat. Donna Marie - Inside Your Mind
14. Statik - Got a Feeling (Mark Breeze Remix)
15. Heaven 7 - This Life (Styles & Breeze Remix)
16. Breeze & MC Storm - Jump Jump a Little Higher (Gammer Remix)
17. Dougal & Gammer - Know The Score (Clubland Edit)
18. Breeze & UFO - Take Your Time (UFO Remix)
- Disc 3: Mixed by Hixxy
1. Hixxy feat. Kate Lesing - More & More
2. Porn Kings vs. Hixxy - Kickin' in the Beat (Hixxy Remix)
3. Hixxy & Styles - Elevator
4. Whizzkid, Flyin' & Sparky - Free at Last (Hixxy Remix)
5. Hixxy & Re-Con - Paradise
6. Sy & Unknown - If That's Alright with You (Hixxy Remix)
7. Hixxy feat. Kate Lesing - I Have to Dream (Dougal & Gammer Remix)
8. Tatu - All About Us (Hixxy Remix)
9. Hixxy - R U Ready (Xtreme Mix)
10. Dario G vs. Hixxy feat. Ingfrid Straumstøyl - All My Life (Dream To Me)
11. Hixxy & MC Storm - Just Accept It (Hixxy 2006 Remix)
12. Hixxy & Re-Con - I Can't Wait (Squad-E Remix)
13. Hixxy - Final Destination

== Clubland X-Treme Hardcore 3 ==
Clubland X-Treme Hardcore 3

Compilation album by various artists
- Released: 11 December 2006
- Genre: Hardcore
- Labels: Universal Music TV, All Around the World
- Compilers: Darren Styles, Breeze, Hixxy

Clubland X-Treme Hardcore chronology
Clubland X-Treme Hardcore 2 (2006)	Clubland X-Treme Hardcore 3 (2006)	Clubland X-Treme Hardcore 4 (2007)

- Disc 1: Mixed by Darren Styles
1. Liz Kay - Castles in the Sky (Darren Styles Remix)
2. Darren Styles feat. Wayne G - Lost the Plot
3. Wave - Piece of Heaven (Squad-E Remix)
4. United in Dance - Here Come the Drums
5. Cascada - Everytime We Touch (Styles & Breeze Remix)
6. Darren Styles & Francis Hill - I Say I Love You
7. Dougal & Gammer - Nobody Likes The Records
8. Darren Styles - Skydivin' (Vocal Mix)
9. Déjà Vu - Face Down Ass Up (Darren Styles Remix)
10. Hyperlogic - Only You (Re-Con Remix)
11. Darren Styles - Save Me (Re-Con Remix)
12. Sy & Unknown feat. Lou Lou - Be with You
13. Ultrabeat & Darren Styles - Sure Feels Good
14. Styles & Breeze - Do You Want Me Honey
15. Vince Nysse & N J Hinton feat. Pascale - Silver Water (Darren Styles Remix)
16. United in Dance - Boom Daka
17. Metro - Make This Happen
- Disc 2: Mixed by Breeze
1. MC Storm Flyin' & Sparky - All About
2. D-Code feat. Emma - My Direction (Squad-E Xtreme Edit)
3. Breeze - Hardcore DJ (Re-Con Remix)
4. Liz Kay - When Love Becomes a Lie (Breeze Remix)
5. Breeze & Re-Con - Only If
6. Cascada - Truly Madly Deeply (Styles & Breeze Remix)
7. Breeze & Euphony feat. Donna Marie - Never be Alone
8. Bodyrox - Yeah Yeah (Dougal & Gammer The Beat's The Bass Remix)
9. Ramos Supreme & Sunset Regime - Gotta Believe (Re-Con Remix)
10. Breeze vs. Lost Witness - Rise Again
11. SHM & Scottie B - Crash
12. Breeze & UFO - Dirty
13. Sy & Unknown feat. Lou Lou - Touch the Sky
14. Breeze & Re-Con - Love You for a Lifetime
15. Sublime - Walking in the Rain (Styles & Breeze Remix)
16. Styles & Breeze - Come On
17. Re-Con & Squad-E - Good to Me
18. Infextious - Let Me Fly (Jamie Ritmen Remix)
- Disc 3: Mixed by Hixxy
1. Squad-E & Chris Henry - Untouchable (Hixxy & Squad-E Remix)
2. Hixxy - Take Me with You
3. Hixxy, Sy & Unknown - Freaks
4. Voodoo & Serano - Overload (Hixxy & Re-Con Remix)
5. Hixxy & Squad-E - Beat Drop
6. Hixxy - More & More (Sy & Unknown Remix)
7. Hixxy & Re-Con - Come Alive
8. Hixxy & Dougal & Gammer - Hot Looking Babes
9. Anti-Social - Forever Young (Hixxy Remix)
10. Hixxy, Sy & Unknown - First Time Meet Up
11. Hixxy & Re-Con - Power of Love
12. Hixxy & Re-Con - Get Hard
13. Hixxy & Euphony feat. Donna Marie - Night Life (Hixxy Remix)
14. Hixxy, Dougal & Gammer feat. MC Storm - I'm Hardcore, This is What I Do
15. Hixxy - Sacrifice

== Clubland X-Treme Hardcore 4 ==
Clubland X-Treme Hardcore 4

Compilation album by various artists
- Released: 3 December 2007
- Genre: Hardcore
- Labels: Universal Music TV, All Around the World
- Compilers: Darren Styles, Breeze, Hixxy

Clubland X-Treme Hardcore chronology
Clubland X-Treme Hardcore 3 (2006)	Clubland X-Treme Hardcore 4 (2007)	Clubland X-Treme Hardcore 5 (2008)

- Disc 1: Mixed by Darren Styles
1. Intro
2. Darren Styles and Francis Hill - Come Running
3. Dougal & Gammer - Don't Stop Go
4. Darren Styles and Squad-E - Baby I'll Let You Know
5. Re-Con - Beating of the Drum (Can You Feel It)
6. Nalin & Kane feat. Alex Prince - Cruising (Beachball '06) (Darren Styles Remix)
7. Hypasonic vs. Jorg Schmidt - Doesn't Matter (Squad-E Remix)
8. Darren Styles and Whizzkid - Girlfriend
9. Gammer - Rippin'
10. Darren Styles feat. Andrea Britton - Show Me the Sunshine
11. Sy & Unknown feat. Lou Lou - Hands of Time
12. Darren Styles & Squad-E - Party People
13. D:Code - Like I Feel (Hardcore Mix)
14. Ultrabeat vs. Darren Styles - Paradise & Dreams (Re-Con Remix)
15. Darren Styles - Jealous (Specialist Sound Remix)
16. Dougal & Gammer feat. MC Storm - Wii Go Crazy
17. Darren Styles and Junior - I Need You (Sy & Unknown Remix)
18. Darren Styles and Francis Hill - Light of My Life
19. Sy & Unknown feat. Emily Reed - Love for Life
- Disc 2: Mixed by Breeze
1. SHM - You and Me (Breeze Remix)
2. Paradise - See the Light (Breeze & Styles Remix)
3. Micky Modelle feat. Jessy - Dancing in the Dark (Breeze & UFO Remix)
4. Breeze vs. Lost Witness - Rise Again (Sy & Unknown Remix)
5. Manian feat. Aila - Heaven (Breeze Remix)
6. Re-Con - Save the Rave
7. M&C feat. Rebecca Rudd - Magic Touch (Squad-E Remix)
8. Breeze vs. Unique - Sometimes
9. Styles & Breeze - Electric (Specialist Sound Remix)
10. Katie Jewels - Burning Love (Breeze Remix)
11. GSDX feat. Amiee - The Dream (Breeze Remix)
12. DJ Demand - Dark & Light (Re-Con Remix)
13. Breeze & Styles - Come with Me (Unique Remix)
14. Breeze & Ritmen - If I Were You
15. Breeze & UFO feat. Vicky Fee - Maybe
16. Breeze & Ritmen feat. Vicky Fee - Don't Go Away
17. Breeze & Styles - Do You Want Me Honey (Force & Ritmen Xtreme Remix)
18. Breeze & UFO - Filthy
- Disc 3: Mixed by Hixxy
1. Hixxy feat. Taya - Take Me to Heaven
2. Dougal & Gammer feat. Hixxy and Lisa Marie - Phaze 2 Phaze
3. Frisco feat. Mandy Edge - Sea of Love (Hixxy Remix)
4. Hixxy & Re-Con - Need Your Loving
5. Hixxy - Time Comes (Sy & Unknown Remix)
6. Starstylerz feat. Michy - Keep on Movin' (Hixxy Remix)
7. Hixxy, Sy & Unknown - Be the One
8. Hixxy - New Day
9. Hixxy & Re-Con - Dance with Me
10. Dougal & Gammer feat. Hixxy and Lisa Marie - Dark Skies
11. Hixxy - Perfect World
12. Hixxy, Sy & Unknown - The 'Clit' Commander
13. Hixxy & Re-Con - Love Comes Version 1.1
14. Hixxy feat. L.O.L - Love Leaves No Scar
15. Hixxy & MC Storm - Jump & Pump
16. Ultrabeat vs. Darren Styles - Sure Feels Good (Hixxy, Sy & Unknown Remix)

== Clubland X-Treme Hardcore 5 ==
Clubland X-Treme Hardcore 5

Compilation album by various artists
- Released: 8 December 2008
- Genre: Hardcore
- Labels: Universal Music TV, All Around the World
- Compilers: Darren Styles, Breeze, Hixxy

Clubland X-Treme Hardcore chronology
Clubland X-Treme Hardcore 4 (2007)	Clubland X-Treme Hardcore 5 (2008)	Clubland X-Treme Hardcore 6 (2009)

- Disc 1: Mixed by Darren Styles
1. Ultrabeat vs. Darren Styles - Discolights (Hardcore Mix)
2. Styles & Breeze - Amigos (Hardcore Mix)
3. Manian - Turn the Tide (Darren Styles Remix)
4. Darren Styles - Sorry
5. Chris Fear - First Serve (Dougal & Gammer Remix)
6. Al Storm & Euphony feat. Donna Marie - All I Wanna Do (Darren Styles Remix)
7. Fragma - Toca's Miracle '08 (Darren Styles Remix)
8. Re-Con & Squad-E - Cut & Recycle
9. Manian - Welcome to the Club (Darren Styles Remix)
10. Darren Styles feat. Justine - Tell Me (Re-Con Remix)
11. Al Storm feat. Malaya - It's Over (DS Mix)
12. Re-Con & Squad-E - Why Does My Heart
13. United in Dance - The Horns of Jericho (Dougal & Gammer Remix)
14. Azora - The Heartache
15. United in Dance - 1,2,3,4
16. Re-Con & Chris Unknown - Please Tell Me
17. Jamie Ritman - Touch the Sun (Darren Styles Remix)
18. Darren Styles - Flashlight
- Disc 2: Mixed by Breeze
1. Breeze vs. Barley feat. Taya - Falling
2. Cascada - Because the Night (Breeze & Unknown Remix)
3. E-Type - True Believer (Styles & Breeze Remix)
4. Sugababes - About You Now (Breeze & Unknown Remix)
5. BassFreakerz - Cry for You (Darren Styles Remix)
6. Mickey Modelle - Take Me Away (Breeze & UFO Remix)
7. Styles & Breeze - Weekend Has Come
8. Breeze & UFO - X-Rated
9. Rob Mayth - Heart 2 Heart (Breeze & Ritmen Remix)
10. Breeze & Styles - Futureset '08
11. Darwin & in Effect feat. Fraz - Only Road (Breeze Remix)
12. Breeze & Chris Unknown - Don't Walk Away
13. Azora - Tell You a Secret (Breeze Remix)
14. Jamie Ritmen - Bassphaze
15. Club Generation - Every Heartbeat
16. Breeze vs. Brad Shure feat. Katie Halliday - Summer Rain
17. Barley feat. Taya - Feeling So Alive
18. Styles, Breeze & Re-Con - Love Sick Crazy
19. Breeze & Chris Unknown - One Desire
- Disc 3: Mixed by Hixxy
1. Hixxy - Deep in the Night
2. Hixxy & Re-Con - The Way
3. Hixxy - No.1
4. United in Dance - Do It Like This
5. Hixxy - Face in the Crowd
6. Hixxy - Brother (Guiding Light)
7. The Real Booty Babes - Played Alive (Darren Styles Remix)
8. Hixxy - Now That I Found You
9. Paul EP & Smithy feat. Becci - Walk on Water (Hixxy Remix)
10. Hixxy & Chris Unknown - Get Up on Your Feet 1,2,3
11. Hixxy - There When You Fall
12. The Real Booty Babes - I Kissed a Girl (Dougal & Gammer Remix)
13. Hixxy & Technikore - MDMA
14. LOL - Love Leaves No Scar (Hixxy Remix)
15. Ultrabeat - Never Ever (Chris Unknown Remix)
16. Hixxy - The Game, Zaboocan
17. Hixxy & Chris Unknown - Slow And Steady Rush
18. Hixxy & MC Storm - Living in a Dream
19. Technikore feat. Nathalie - Calling Out for You

== Clubland X-Treme Hardcore 6 ==
Clubland X-Treme Hardcore 6

Compilation album by various artists
- Released: 7 December 2009
- Genre: Hardcore
- Labels: Universal Music TV, All Around the World
- Compilers: Darren Styles, Breeze, Hixxy

Clubland X-Treme Hardcore chronology
Clubland X-Treme Hardcore 5 (2008)	Clubland X-Treme Hardcore 6 (2009)	Clubland X-Treme Hardcore 7 (2010)

- Disc 1: Mixed by Darren Styles
1. Intro
2. Darren Styles & Manian - Outta My Head
3. Dougal & Gammer - Models Are Ugly
4. John O'Callaghan - Find Yourself (Darren Styles Remix)
5. Chris Fear - Rock 'n' Roller
6. Cascada - Everytime I Hear Your Name (Dougal & Gammer Remix)
7. Re-Con - Fuel to Fire
8. Dougal & Gammer - Anybody Else but You
9. Darren Styles - Bassline Road
10. Tom Parr - Missing You (Gammer Remix)
11. DJ Gollum - Passenger (Hardcore Mix)
12. Styles & Breeze - Electric 2010
13. Odyssey, Modulate & Petruccio - Stairway to Heaven
14. Darren Styles & Chris Unknown feat. Molly - Shining Star
15. Re-Con - Kidz
16. Darren Styles - Do You Feel the Same
17. Technikore - Runaway (Breeze Remix)
18. JB-C - Rock 1 Time
19. Sy & Unknown - Move It
20. Kirsten Joy - Only Your Love (Chris Unknown & Re-Con)
- Disc 2: Mixed by Breeze
1. MC Whizzkid - The Ringmaster (Intro)
2. Ultrabeat - Use Somebody (Chris Unknown Remix)
3. Styles & Breeze - Sonic 2010
4. Breeze & Beat Commanders feat. MOB - Party Vibe
5. Breeze & Re-Con - Twist
6. Master Blaster - Everywhere (Breeze & UFO Remix)
7. Keira Green - All Outta Love (Azora Remix)
8. Breeze & UFO - Hardcore Orchestra
9. Frisco & Alexia - Me and You (Breeze Remix)
10. Kaskade & Deadmau5 - Move for Me (Dougal & Gammer Remix)
11. Beat Commanders - Make You Mine (Supreme, UFO & MOB Remix)
12. Dougal & Gammer - Boing!
13. Scooter - Lonely (Breeze & Ritmen Remix)
14. Re-Con - Torn Apart
15. ItaloBrothers - Stamp on the Ground (Breeze Remix)
16. Dougal & Gammer - Break It
17. Breeze & UFO vs. Lost Witness - Love to the Stars
18. Sy & Unknown - Electronic VIP
19. Breeze & Unique - Reach Out
20. Styles & Breeze feat. Karen Danzig - Heartbeatz (Specialist Sound Remix)
- Disc 3: Mixed by Hixxy
1. Dougal & Gammer - Shine Your Light
2. Al Storm feat. Amy - Surrender (Clubland Mix)
3. Ramos, Punch & Protocol feat. MC Drew - Summer Love (Hixxy Remix)
4. AudioJunkie & Stylus - Taken Over Me
5. Hixxy & Technikore - Now You Got Me
6. Re-Con - Without Doubt
7. Hixxy & Sy - Dum, Der Did It Dit It
8. Al Storm & Euphony feat. Danielle - Turn Around 2009/ 10
9. Dougal & Gammer - Boom Ba De
10. Hixxy - Million Miles
11. Sy & Unknown feat. Emily Reed - Digital Lover (Re-Con Remix)
12. Hixxy - Kaleidoscope
13. Re-Con - Walking Time Bomb
14. JB-C - Clubwalker
15. MC Storm - H>A>R>D C.O.R.E.
16. Hixxy & Technikore - Re-loaded
17. Cadence - I Surrender (Hixxy Hardcore Remix)
18. D:Code - Make You Love Me (Squad-E Remix)

== Clubland X-Treme Hardcore 7 ==
Clubland X-Treme Hardcore 7

Compilation album by various artists
- Released: 27 December 2010
- Genre: Hardcore
- Labels: Universal Music TV, All Around the World
- Compilers: Darren Styles, Breeze, Hixxy

Clubland X-Treme Hardcore chronology
Clubland X-Treme Hardcore 6 (2009)	Clubland X-Treme Hardcore 7 (2010)	Clubland X-Treme Hardcore 8 (2012)

- Disc 1: Mixed by Darren Styles
1. The Entity - Wisdom
2. Darren Styles & Francis Hill feat. Lucy - Here Tonight
3. Dougal, Gammer & Chris Fear - Supersonic
4. Darren Styles - Holding On
5. Double Dutch - Bring the Noise (Darren Styles Remix)
6. Gammer - Major Panic (Have It Back)
7. Darren Styles feat. Tyler - Open Your Eyes
8. Danny Byrd - We Can Have It All (Re-Con Remix)
9. Gammer & Whizzkid - Could be Real
10. Darren Styles - Raining Down
11. Dougal, Gammer & JB-C - Tape Machine
12. Darren Styles - Getting Better (Gammer Update)
13. Styles & Re-Con - Take You Down
14. Re-Con & Gammer - Get It Right
15. Klubfiller feat. Kyla - On a Cloud
16. Darren Styles & Chris Unknown - Reload
17. Rudedog - Walk into the Sun (Darren Styles Remix)
18. Slammer & Auscore - The Way (Darren Styles Remix)
19. Sy & Unknown - Walking on Air
20. Plasticman - Blackout
21. Dougal & Gammer feat. Jerome - Domination
- Disc 2: Mixed by Breeze
1. Flip & Fill - I Need Air (Breeze & Chris Unknown Remix)
2. Styles & Breeze - Your Shining (Petruccio & Modulate Remix)
3. Duck Sauce - Barbra Streisand (MOB Remix)
4. Styles & Breeze - Into Your Eyes
5. Inna - 10 Minutes (Breeze & Klubfiller Remix)
6. Breeze & Mob - Is It Too Late
7. Dakota Ray - Feels So Good (Breeze & Chris Unknown Remix)
8. Breeze & Styles - Thugboy (Flyin & Sparky Remix)
9. Petruccio & Modulate feat. Marie Louise - Fuck It Up!
10. Styles & Breeze feat. Karen Danzig - Heartbeatz (Supreme & Mob Remix)
11. Breeze & Klubfiller - Are You Ready?
12. Stylus & AudioJunkie feat. Whizzkid - Bassline Criminal
13. Michael Scout feat. Ste McNally - All This I Know
14. Breeze & Ritmen - Get a Fuckin' Life
15. Eufeion - SAW
16. Breeze - 1 2 3 Hit It!
17. Breeze & Kevin Energy - The Pendulum of Bass
18. Micky Modelle vs. Breeze feat. Stunt - I'm Alive
19. Breeze & Chris Unknown - Kick Your Legs
20. Breeze & UFO - Dirty (2010)
21. GSDX feat. Scandal - Lose This Feeling (Breeze Remix)
- Disc 3: Mixed by Hixxy
1. Squad-E & MC Storm - Hardcore Syco (Exclusive X-Treme Mix)
2. Hixxy - Don't Feel Like Love
3. Dougal & Gammer - Hard as Fuck
4. R.I.O. - Shine On (Hixxy Remix)
5. Ramos, Supreme & Mob feat. Mandy Edge - Catch You (Re-Con Remix)
6. Hixxy & Chris Unknown - This is How We Roll
7. Klubfiller - Break of Day
8. Hixxy & Technikore feat. Intraspekt - Don't Need
9. Anti-Social - My Way (Re-Con Remix)
10. Sy & Unknown feat. JT - Love Song
11. Hixxy - Feel It in the Air (Gammer Remix)
12. Al Storm - Werewolf
13. Klubfiller - Get the Funk (KF Hardcore Edit)
14. Hixxy - I Wanna Play Your Game
15. Hixxy & Technikore - Home Alone
16. Supreme & MOB feat. JJ - I Hate You 2010
17. Hixxy & Chris Unknown - Konfusion
18. Hixxy, Ramos & Punch - You're Gonna Love Me
19. Hixxy & Re-Con - Crazy Underground
20. Al Storm - Mad House
- Disc 4: Best of Clubland X-Treme Hardcore
1. Ultrabeat & Scott Brown - Elysium (Styles & Breeze Remix)
2. Darren Styles - Save Me
3. Scooter - Nessaja (Breeze Remix)
4. Hixxy feat. Kate Lesing - More & More
5. Love Decade - So Real (Styles & Breeze Remix)
6. Apollo - Dance (Re-Con Remix)
7. Hypasonic vs. Jorg Schmid - Doesn't Matter (Squad-E Remix)
8. Breeze vs. Lost Witness - Rise Again
9. Special D - Come with Me (Hixxy Remix)
10. N-Trance - Set You Free (Hixxy Remix)
11. Scott Brown & Cat Knight - All About You (Styles & Breeze Remix)
12. Bimbo Jones - Come Fly with Me (Re-Con Remix)
13. Re-Con - Pull Over
14. Ultrabeat vs. Darren Styles - Sure Feels Good (Hardcore Mix)
15. Dougal & Gammer - Make Some Noise
16. Sy & Unknown feat. Lou Lou - U R My Phantasy (Darren Styles Remix)
17. Styles & Breeze - Slide Away

== Clubland X-Treme Hardcore 8 ==
Clubland X-Treme Hardcore 8

Compilation album by various artists
- Released: 16 January 2012
- Genre: Hardcore
- Labels: Universal Music TV, All Around the World
- Compilers: Darren Styles, Breeze, Re-Con, Hixxy

Clubland X-Treme Hardcore chronology
Clubland X-Treme Hardcore 7 (2010)	Clubland X-Treme Hardcore 8 (2012)	Clubland X-Treme Hardcore 9 (2013)

- Disc 1: Mixed by Darren Styles
1. Darren Styles & Gammer - You & I
2. Herd & Fitz feat. Abigail Bailey - I Just Can't Get Enough (Re-Con & Squad-E Remix)
3. Gammer & Whizzkid - We Killed the Rave
4. Darren Styles - Satellite
5. Eclipse - 24/7 (Styles & Breeze 2011 Remix)
6. Modulate - What You Got
7. Benny Benassi feat. Gary Go - Cinema (Styles & Modulate Remix)
8. N-Force vs. Darren Styles - Right by Your Side (Gammer Remix)
9. Oxygen feat. Andrea Britton - Am I on Your Mind? (Styles & Re-Con Remix)
10. Darren Styles - Screwface
11. Black & White - Get Your Hands Up (Darren Styles Remix)
12. Darren Styles - Mercy
13. Darren Styles, Prospect & Becci - Lose Yourself
14. Apollo - Dance (Darren Styles Remix)
15. Modulate feat. Jay Jacob - 3
16. Darren Styles feat. Tyler - Open Your Eyes (Petruccio & Modulate Remix)
17. Darren Styles - Bonfire
18. Styles, Breeze, Petruccio & Modulate - Rock the Club
19. Sy & Unknown feat. Kirsten Joy - Bright Like the Sun
- Disc 2: Mixed by Breeze
1. Sosumi feat. Misy DJ - You Got the Love (Breeze & Modulate Remix)
2. Breeze & Modulate - Bang 2 Me Nasty (VIP Mix)
3. Modulate feat. Marie Louise - 2 Lift Me Up
4. Breeze & Modulate - Inside Out (Hardcore Mix)
5. Styles, Breeze & Klubfiller - See the Stars
6. Ham - Anything for You
7. Organ Donors - Make the Girlies Wet (Breeze & Modulate Hardcore Remix)
8. Petruccio & Modulate feat. Marie Louise - Missing
9. Petruccio & Modulate feat. MC Whizzkid - Tsunami
10. Breeze & Modulate feat. Marie Louise - Wait Up!
11. Stylus & Audiojunkie - Synth Mode
12. Styles & Breeze - Crack It Smack It
13. Petruccio & Modulate feat. Mark Slammer - High on You
14. Darren Styles, Prospect & Becci - Driving Me Crazy
15. Petruccio & Modulate - Skank in the House
16. Destiny - Today
17. Modulate feat. MC Static - Maniac
18. Major Players - Come with Me (Petruccio Remix)
19. Sy & Unknown - You Got Me Rockin'
20. Adam Harris - For a Lifetime (Breeze Remix)
- Disc 3: Hardcore Til I Die - Mixed by Re-Con and Hixxy
1. Re-Con & Demand feat. Mandy Edge - Heart Bleeds
2. Re-Con & MC Storm - Hardcore Bones
3. Re-Con & Demand - Something's Gotta Hold on Me
4. Klubfiller - Feel Alive
5. Re-Con - Calling
6. Hixxy, Dave Castellano & Fat Steve - Falling from the Sky
7. Blood Red - Show Me the Way (Re-Con vs. Blood Red Re-Hash)
8. Hixxy - Outside World
9. Re-Con & Demand feat. Mandy Edge - I'm Sorry
10. Defiant DJs - Levels
11. Hixxy - Rock the World
12. Re-Con & Klubfiller - Good for Me
13. Hixxy - Sora Blue
14. Klubfiller - Sunshine Way
15. Sy & Technikore - Crash the Party
16. Hixxy - I'm Hardcore till I Die
17. Re-Con - WTF
18. Hixxy & M.O.B - Touch Myself
19. Hixxy, Ramos, Protocol & Dubzie - Open Your Eyes

== Clubland X-Treme Hardcore 9 ==
Clubland X-Treme Hardcore 9

Compilation album by various artists
- Released: 18 March 2013
- Genres: Hardcore, Dubstep, Drum and bass
- Labels: Universal Music TV, All Around the World
- Compilers: Darren Styles, Breeze, Hixxy, Gammer

Clubland X-Treme Hardcore chronology
Clubland X-Treme Hardcore 8 (2012)	Clubland X-Treme Hardcore 9 (2013)	100% Clubland X-Treme (2018)

- Disc 1: Mixed by Darren Styles
1. Darren Styles feat. Molly - Never Forget You
2. Dougal & Gammer - Fuck That Shit
3. Ayah Marar - Unstoppable (Metrik Remix)
4. Gareth Emery feat. Christina Novelli - Concrete Angel (Darren Styles & Chris Unknown Remix)
5. Matrix & Futurebound - Magnetic Eyes (Darren Styles & Modulate Remix)
6. Steampunk - Loki's Theme (Re-Con Remix)
7. Darren Styles - Save Me (Modulate Drumstep Remix)
8. Dougal & Gammer feat. Hannah Faulkner - The One
9. Darren Styles & Michael Scout feat. Ste McNally - Forever
10. Re-Con - Gyroscope
11. Darren Styles & Re-Con - Sober
12. Darren Styles & Gammer/John O'Callaghan - Paranoia (Original Mix)/Find Yourself (Darren Styles Remix)
13. Ayah Marar - The Raver (Darren Styles Remix)
14. Gammer & Klubfiller - Late Night
15. Tyler feat. Static - Fight
16. Darren Styles & Dougal - Don't Give Up
17. Dougal & Gammer - Don't Leave Me
18. Steampunk - Forever Loved (Re-Con Remix)
19. Gammer & Michael Scout - Bye Bye
- Disc 2: Mixed by Breeze
1. Modulate feat. MC Whizzkid - Bitch Slap
2. T2Kazuya - Youth
3. Petruccio & Modulate feat. Marie Louise - Escape
4. Modulate - Dagger
5. MOB & Becci - Taking Me Over
6. Modulate feat. Marie Louise - Body Scream
7. Nero - Won't You be There (Baauer Remix)
8. Chase & Status feat. Liam Bailey - Blind Faith (Loadstar Remix)
9. Fleur & Cutline - Broken Mirror (Metrik Remix)
10. Modulate feat. MC Static - May Day
11. Breeze & Petruccio - Inception
12. Rocket Pimp - Grim Reaper (Skeets Remix)
13. The Prototypes - Suffocate
14. Jayline - Do You Like Jungle (Breeze VIP)
15. Tantrum Desire feat. I-KAY - What is Your Desire
16. Breeze & Modulate - Don't Hold Back
17. Breeze & Modulate feat. Angie Brown - So Good
18. Modulate - Moving
19. Tyl3r & Reynolds - Break Out
20. JENN D - Lose It (Loadstar Remix)
21. Breeze & Chris Unknown - R3tro
22. Breeze & Modulate - You Got It All
23. Magikstar - Calling (Modulate VIP Mix)
- Disc 3, Part 1: Mixed by Hixxy
1. Ultrabeat - Rain Stops (Re-Con vs. Blood Red Remix)
2. Da Tweekaz feat. Oscar - Break the Spell (Hixxy Remix)
3. Chris Unknown - Hardcore Mother Fucker
4. Hixxy - Deep in the Night (2013 VIP)
5. Klubfiller - Coming Home
6. Hixxy - Turniup
7. Klubfiller & MC Storm - F.T.I.D
8. Hixxy - Ano Hi Yume
9. Mob, Ramos & Protocol - Forget Her Name (Hixxy Remix)
10. Ian Van Dahl - Inspiration (Chris Unknown Remix)
11. Hixxy vs. Lucy Westhead - Don't Let Me Know
12. Hixxy & Re-Con - Power of Love (2013 VIP)
- Disc 3, Part 2: Mixed by Gammer
1. Dougal & Gammer feat. Hannah Faulkner - Knight in Shining Armour (Intro feat. Egoraptor)
2. Benny Benassi feat. Gary Go - Cinema (Skrillex Remix) (Gammer Dubcore Edit)
3. Gammer - Nostalgia
4. Re-Con & Demand feat. Mandy Edge - I'm Sorry (Gammer & Klubfiller Remix)
5. Darren Styles/Dougal & Gammer - Xfer/Anybody Else but You (Acapella)
6. Matt Lee - Wait a Second (170 Mix)
7. Dougal & Gammer - Mix Your Sex
8. Clear Vu - Never 2 Late (Gammer Remix)
9. Nero - Promises (Skrillex & Nero Remix) (Gammer Dubcore Edit)
10. Gammer/Ultrabeat & Darren Styles - Good Life (Bad Day)/Sure Feels Good
11. U Mad/Darren Styles - Ian? (Icarus Remix)/Getting Better (Acapella)
12. Dougal & Gammer - Dibi Dibi Sound
13. Stylus & AudioJunkie - Rope Burn
14. Gomurpls/Dougal & Gammer feat. Niki Mak - Aerodynamic/Everytime I Hear Your Name
15. Ruffage - Paradise (Gammer 'Parakick' Remix)
16. Petruccio & Modulate feat. Marie Louise - Missing (Gammer Remix)
17. Gammer & Klubfiller feat. Mandy Edge - Closer
18. Scott Brown/Paradise - Elysium/See the Light (Acapella)
19. Celldweller/Gammer & Whizzkid - Tough Guy/Scream
20. Darren Styles - Save Me (Gammer's Super Awesome Ballad Version That Goes Down Well Everywhere in the World)
21. Gammer & Whizzkid - We Killed the Rave (Best Hardcore Track of the Year Edition)

== See also ==
- Bonkers (compilation album series)
- Clubland (compilation series)
- Clubland (dance brand)
