= Feel It with Me =

2005 single by Ultrabeat

"Feel It With Me"

Single by Ultrabeat
- Released: 19 September 2005
- Genre: Dance, house
- Length: 3:22 (radio edit)
- Label: All Around the World
- Songwriter(s): Leigh Horton (Stompy), Jeff Shields (Supreme), Jason Holloway (U.F.O), Rachel Waldon
- Producer(s): Ultrabeat

Ultrabeat singles chronology
"Better Than Life" (2004)	"Feel It With Me" (2005)	"Elysium (I Go Crazy)" (2006)

"Feel It With Me" is the fourth Ultrabeat single. It was released in September 2005 and it reached number 57 on the UK Singles Chart. It is the only Ultrabeat song to date that has not reached the Top 40 in the charts and is the lowest charting Ultrabeat song. It is the last of the Ultrabeat singles, so far, that has Mike Di Scala on vocals. The song was brought out on CD and 12 inch and artists who remixed this track were Styles & Breeze, Friday Night Posse, Flip & Fill, and Hixxy.

== Music video ==
The video starts with a girl in the back of a taxi, she is on her mobile phone and is looking out of the window. Then it show her legs as she steps out of the taxi and then moves on to another woman wearing a yellow dress on the catwalk in a fashion show.

The video then switches between the woman from the start walking down a corridor backstage at the fashion show, and different women on the catwalk. The woman then pushes past two girls and two bouncers to get into the dressing room. Here there are models putting on make-up and their outfits and fashion designers and there are some girls who are drinking.

The woman meets up with her friends and they put their dresses on meanwhile the video shows shots of the woman in the yellow dress every so often. Then the woman and her two friends walk past the bouncers and on to the catwalk where they model their dresses.

Although Ultrabeat do not appear in the video as the song stops Mike can be heard shouting "Is that alright, that? We're out of here", then laughing.

== Track listing ==
12" Promo

1. Extended Mix
2. Styles & Breeze Remix
3. Friday Night Posse Remix
4. Flip & Fill Remix
5. Hixxy Remix

Promo CD / CD Single

1. Radio Edit
2. Extended Mix
3. Styles & Breeze Remix
4. Friday Night Posse Remix
5. Hixxy Remix
6. Flip & Fill Remix

12" Single

1. Extended Mix
2. Styles & Breeze Remix

Download

1. Hixxy Edit – (3:16)
2. Radio Edit – (3:22)
3. Extended Mix – (6:00)
4. Hixxy Remix – (6:35)
5. Flip & Fill Remix – (6:49)
6. Styles & Beeze Remix – (6:54)
7. Friday Night Posse Remix – (7:32)

== Chart performance ==
Chart (2005)	Peak Position
Scotland (OCC)	37
UK Singles (OCC)	57
