= Karen Danzig =

British singer

- Born: Karen Jane Danzig; 13 July 1972 (age 53); United Kingdom
- Occupation: Singer / songwriter
- Website: karendanzig.com

Karen Jane Danzig (born 13 July 1972) is a British singer with paternal German ancestry. She was raised by profoundly deaf parents, with a hearing brother and a deaf younger sister.

Danzig, mostly known for her success in the clubland genre of Dance music, sang and co-wrote "Heartbeatz" which entered the UK Singles Chart at No.16 on All Around The World Records.

She has co-written and given vocal performances for tracks by Styles & Breeze, Flip & Fill, Love to Infinity, and Micky Modelle, and for labels such as All Around The World, Ministry of Sound, Sony ATV, Can You Feel It, and Serious Records.

She is published by Notting Hill Music/23rd Precinct, and now writes, records and performs with songwriter/producer Bill Padley as dance-pop act Radiola.

== Training and early career ==
Danzig trained from an early age in classical singing at the Watford School of Music and went on to achieve a First Class Honours Degree in Music & Performing Arts at Chichester University, and a Post Graduate Diploma in Acting & Musical Theatre at Hertfordshire Theatre School. In 1992 she toured the world with the National Youth Choir of Great Britain. Upon graduation she enjoyed a career singing jazz and pop in London and Bangkok, as well as being a vocal coach.

Her first major recording project was with Stock & Aitken, fronting a ‘Blondie-esque’ pop-rock band called The Park. The band were created to promote the world's first CD Phonecard single, which featured two of Danzig's songs. She continued songwriting with Ricky Wilde and Sam Bergliter and recording for Serious Records (Sonique’s label), and Red Rose/Millennium. Solo releases included "Outcry" (funky house) with Sam Bergliter and "DJ in Town" (Millennium distribution) which she showcased at the London Astoria and other UK clubs. Danzig also worked on several commercial UK garage/2 Step projects with remixers The Problem Kids and Big Ca$ino. She also had her own pop-dance girlband, TULA, who made appearances on the first series of X Factor. They performed regularly around London clubs at acoustic nights at the Kashmir Club and Kabaret.

Danzig first met up with hardcore DJs Hixxy and Force & Styles in 1999, when she was asked to contribute a track for the Sony Music TV album, This Is Noize.

== UK chart ==
In 2005, Danzig's club anthem "Heartbeatz", with Styles & Breeze, reached No. 16 in the UK Singles Chart and featured on many clubland and Floorfillers compilations, as well as Now That's What I Call Music! 60. The video was at the top of the Box TV video chart for four consecutive weeks.

She continued to work with various producers including Love To Infinity, Micky Modelle, Billy Bunter, Kenny Hayes, and countless others, on labels such as All Around The World, Ministry Of Sound,.

== Tours and clubs ==
In 2007, she was chosen to front all UK P.A.s for the No. 10 UK chart hit "Dancing in the Dark" (Micky Modelle) and she featured on the first Clubland Live UK tour, with Cascada, Scooter, Ultrabeat, Flip & Fill, Kelly Llorenna, Styles & Breeze, and others. She performed on the Choices For Life arena tour with The MacDonald Brothers (X Factor) and Keith Jack for two years running.

She sang on the first Clubland Ibiza tour, as well as the first Dance Nation tour with Hard2Beat, Basshunter, Sash!, September, Booty Luv and others.

More recent releases include "La La La La La", with the Sound Selektaz, and a new project, Radiola, a collaboration with Bill Padley.
