= Q-Tex =

Scottish techno music group

Q-Tex were a Scottish techno music group active in the 1990s. Their line up consisted of Gillian Tennant (vocals), Scott Brown (keyboards), Gordon Anderson (keyboards) and Alan Todd (keyboards), and first played at The Metro, Saltcoats, Ayrshire, Scotland in 1991.

The group started while the members were undertaking college studies with their first record, "The Equator EP", released in August 1991. Q-Tex had several major hits on the Scottish Singles Chart and UK Singles Chart, their breakthrough and most well-known being "The Power of Love" which charted twice, first in 1994 (#13 Scotland, #65 UK) and again as a remix in 1997 (#10 Scotland, #49 UK). "Believe" is their highest Scottish charting single, peaking at #2, and "Let the Love" is their highest UK charting single, peaking at #30.

Their album Into the Light charted at #89 in the UK in July 1997.

== Singles ==
Year	Title	Peak chart positions	
Year	Title	UK	SCO
1994	"Power of Love"	65	13
1994	"Believe"	41	2
1996	"Let the Love"	30	3
1996	"Do You Want Me"	48	8
1997	"Power of Love 97"	49	10
1997	"Lies"	91	48
