= Elysium (I Go Crazy) =

Single by Ultrabeat vs. Scott Brown
- Released: 24 April 2006
- Length: 3:21 (radio edit)
- Label: All Around the World
- Songwriter(s): Scott Brown, Mike Di Scala, Chris Henry
- Producer(s): Ultrabeat

Ultrabeat singles chronology
"Feel It with Me" (2005)	"Elysium (I Go Crazy)" (2006)	"Sure Feels Good" (2007)

"Elysium (I Go Crazy)" is the 5th single by Liverpool dance trio Ultrabeat. It was released in 2006 and played throughout the summer of that year. Ultrabeat used the vocals of Rebecca Rudd to Scott Brown's hardcore cult hit "Elysium" and gave it a trance remix, achieving further commercial success for a song which is perceived by many hardcore fans as a great dance anthem.

The song represented a change in style for Ultrabeat as this song and "Sure Feels Good" were slightly more hardcore songs than previous Ultrabeat singles, as they were both collaborations with hardcore artists. "Elysium" reached number 38 on the UK Singles Chart.

== Music video ==
The video was filmed in 2006 and was directed by Mike Cockayne. It shows a crowd of people in a nightclub waiting for Rebecca Rudd, the only barmaid, to serve them. She is singing the words to the song. When she sees a man she likes chatting to another woman she smashes a glass on the floor along with a bar full of glasses. She then climbs on to the bar, looking down on the crowd and still singing the song. She Jumps into the crowd and 'crowd surfs' on her back.

She is then on a small platform singing the song with two other dancers, while the crowd is dancing. The video then switches between Rebecca Rudd singing, the two dancers, the crowd dancing, and Rebecca Rudd 'crowd surfing' before it shows Rebecca Rudd cleaning up the empty bar (indicating her being left alone again) and a single dancer on the empty platform at the end of the video.

== Track listings ==
CD single

1. Radio Edit
2. Extended Mix
3. Styles & Breeze Remix
4. Scott Brown Remix
5. Friday Night Posse Remix
6. Major Players Remix

12-inch single

1. Extended Mix
2. Friday Night Posse Remix
3. Alex K Remix
4. Scott Brown Remix

== Charts ==
Chart (2006)	Peak position
Australia (ARIA)	153
Ireland (IRMA)	40
Scotland (OCC)	13
UK Singles (OCC)	35

== Certifications ==
Region	Certification	Certified units/sales
United Kingdom (BPI)	Silver	200,000^{‡}
^{‡} Sales+streaming figures based on certification alone.
