= Better Than Life (song) =

Single by Ultrabeat
- Released: 30 August 2004
- Genre: Dance, Scouse House
- Length: 3:12 (radio edit)
- Label: All Around the World
- Songwriter(s): Mike Di Scala, Paul Smith
- Producer(s): Ultrabeat

Ultrabeat singles chronology
"Feelin' Fine" (2003)	"Better Than Life" (2004)	"Feel It with Me" (2005)

"Better Than Life" was the third single released by Liverpool dance act Ultrabeat. It was written by Mike Di Scala and professional boxer Paul Smith. It was released in 2004 and reached number 23 on the UK Singles Chart, number 34 in Ireland, and number 51 in the Netherlands.

The song was brought out on CD and vinyl formats and the remixes for this track were done by CJ Stone, Flip & Fill, Styles & Breeze, and Mike Di Scala's other alias, Rezonance Q.

== Music video ==
The video is set on a tropical island somewhere and features three young women and Ultrabeat. The three women are shown running down a beach and as they get close to the camera the video switches to Mike Di Scala who is singing. The video then shows Ultrabeat at a table eating and looking at photos of the girls. The video then goes in on a particular photograph and shows the girls on a beach and switches between the girls and Mike Di Scala singing.

Then the girls drive past Ultrabeat in a silver convertible. Ultrabeat get in a small 4x4 and follow them. The video shows the girls on the beach and Mike Di Scala singing for the last time before showing the girls walking into a bar, and dancing next to Ultrabeat.

The video makes use of close-ups when looking at Di Scala's sunglasses and the photographs to switch scenes. It also flips between scenes of the girls and Di Scala or Ultrabeat showing them during the day before they get together at the end.

== Track listing ==
CD Single

1. Radio Edit
2. Extended Mix
3. CJ Stone Remix
4. Flip & Fill Remix
5. Styles & Breeze Remix
6. Rezonance Q Remix

12" Single

1. Extended Mix
2. CJ Stone Remix
3. Voodoo & Serano Remix
4. Styles & Breeze Remix

12" Promo

1. Club Mix
2. CJ Stone Remix
3. Flip & Fill Remix
4. Styles & Breeze Remix
5. Rezonance Q Remix

Download

1. Radio Edit
2. Extended Mix
3. CJ Stone Remix
4. Flip & Fill Remix
5. Styles & Breeze Remix
6. Rezonance Q Remix
7. Voodoo & Serano Remix
8. Ultrasonic Remix
9. Alt Radio Edit
10. Alt Radio Edit 2
11. Radio Edit 2
12. Clubstar Remix
13. Eighth Day Remix

== Charts ==
Chart (2004)	Peak position
Belgium (Ultratip Bubbling Under Flanders)	15
Ireland (IRMA)	34
Ireland Dance (IRMA)	5
Netherlands (Single Top 100)	51
Scotland (OCC)	15
UK Singles (OCC)	23
UK Dance (OCC)	12
