= N-Force =

UK musical group

- Origin: Liverpool, England
- Genres: Electronic, house
- Years active: 2008–present
- Label: All Around the World
- Members: Jorg Schmid; Chris Henry; Lois McConnell

N-Force is an English dance music act that formed in 2008.

== Career ==
The act comprises Lois McConnell as lead singer, plus Jorg Schmid and Chris Henry. N-Force is currently signed to UK Dance label All Around the World, and have so far released six singles in the UK and Germany. N-Force's tracks have appeared on various Clubland compilation CDs. Some of their songs have attained some mild success in the UK and Germany. One of their songs, "All My Life" has accumulated over 6,000,000 views as of October, 2011 on YouTube.

Schmid has stated that there are more "N-Force" songs to come, but it is unknown if McConnell will still front the act, as she seems to be developing a solo career. However a new single entitled "The One" surfaced in 2011, which still had McConnells's vocals.

== Discography ==
=== Singles ===
Year	Title	Chart positions		
Year	Title	UK	UK Dance	GER
2008	"Right By Your Side" (vs Darren Styles)	77	8	46
2008	"All My Life"	114	12	—
2009	"All Or Nothing"	—	33	—
2010	"Don't Stop"	—	—	—
2010	"Just For You"	—	—	—
2010	"Shape of My Heart"	—	—	—
2011	"The One"			

=== As a featured artist ===
Year	Title	Chart positions
Year	Title	UK
2011	"Not Too Late" Fearless Featuring Lois McConnell (Lead singer of N-Force)	167
