= Pretty Green Eyes =

1997 single by Force & Styles

Single by Force & Styles and Junior

from the album All over the UK
- B-side: "Apollo 13, pt. II (The Journey Home)"
- Released: 24 February 1997
- Recorded: 1996
- Studio: UK Dance (Clacton-on-Sea, England)
- Genre: Happy hardcore, drum and bass
- Length: 6:48
- Label: UK Dance
- Songwriter(s): Paul Hobbs, Darren Mew, Leroy Van Brown
- Producer(s): Force & Styles

Force & Styles singles chronology
"United in Dance" (1997)	"Pretty Green Eyes" (1997)	"Paradise & Dreams" (1997)

"Pretty Green Eyes" is a song originally written and recorded by Force & Styles featuring Junior. An album mix appeared on their debut album, All Over the UK (1996), and the song was released as a 12-inch single in 1997. The song achieved mainstream popularity in 2003 when it was covered by Ultrabeat and peaked at No. 2 on the UK Singles Chart.

== Force & Styles version ==
The Force & Styles version was a happy hardcore, recorded with Junior at their own 'UK Dance Studios', in Clacton-on-Sea, Essex in 1996.

"Pretty Green Eyes" first appeared on hardcore compilation albums, and in 1997 it was released on 12-inch vinyl on Force & Styles's own record label UK Dance Records, with a B-side "Apollo 13 [pt II] (The Journey Home)". The vinyl was also re-released in 2001. This hardcore version, although popular among hardcore listeners, never achieved the same mainstream success as the Ultrabeat cover. After the death of Junior on 31 December 2011, an online campaign to get the original, hardcore version into the charts was started called "Let's get Junior - Pretty Green Eyes (Force & Styles) to #1".

=== Track listing ===
12-inch single

1. "Pretty Green Eyes" (feat. Junior) – 6:48
2. "Apollo 13 [pt II] (The Journey Home)" – 6:04

=== Personnel ===
Force & Styles

- Paul Hobbs – producer
- Darren Mew – producer

Additional musicians

- Junior – vocals

== Ultrabeat version ==
"Pretty Green Eyes"

Single by Ultrabeat
- Released: 4 August 2003
- Length: 3:25
- Label: All Around the World
- Songwriter(s): Paul Hobbs, Darren Mew, Leroy Van Brown Van Brown
- Producer(s): Ultrabeat

Ultrabeat singles chronology
"Pretty Green Eyes" (2003)	"Feelin' Fine" (2003)

Ultrabeat's members had all been fans of happy hardcore since 1997 and when they decided to record a song, they chose to cover the old Force & Styles song "Pretty Green Eyes". The group used a recording studio in Liverpool where Mike Di Scala was the engineer, and they first recorded the song there, with Di Scala singing. During the recording session, they did not have a pop filter for the microphone, so they had to use a sock instead.

The song was signed by All Around the World because of Di Scala's last single for the label under the Rezonance Q alias. "Someday", a cover of the Mariah Carey song, had achieved a peak of No. 29 in the charts and when Di Scala was discussing its success with All Around the World, he played them Ultrabeat's demo of "Pretty Green Eyes".

=== Release and reception ===
"Pretty Green Eyes" became more popular when it was released on promos and Clubland III and played more in nightclubs. The song was released as a single on 4 August 2003. It entered the UK Singles Chart at No. 2 and stayed in the chart for 15 weeks. This led to Ultrabeat performing on Top of the Pops and a lock-out signing in the HMV store in Liverpool.

=== Music video ===
The video was filmed in London and features three young women who are dancers in a random nightclub. They are putting on their make-up and outfits, then they dance in the strip club, then the video switches to a nightclub, and back between the two.

Ultrabeat also appear in the video. They are sitting down on chairs in the strip club and they are also DJing at the nightclub. The video makes use of green lighting and green clothes, and switches between locations after zooming in on one of the girl's green eyes.

The original video for "Pretty Green Eyes" was actually a casino scene filmed at the Baby Blue Bar on the Albert Dock in Liverpool, but was not used as the actual music video. The scene depicts a gorgeous girl with green eyes gambling on the dice table. The dice dealer, Bill Pettrey, was the Deputy General Manager of Leo Casino, one of Liverpool's top night spots on Queen's Dock.

=== Track listings ===
CD single 1

1. "Pretty Green Eyes" (radio edit) – 3:21
2. "Pretty Green Eyes" (CJ Stone remix) – 7:52
3. "Pretty Green Eyes" (extended mix) – 6:55

CD single 2

1. "Pretty Green Eyes" (CJ Stone edit) – 3:04
2. "Pretty Green Eyes" (N-Trance remix) – 6:46
3. "Pretty Green Eyes" (Scott Brown remix) – 6:38
4. "Pretty Green Eyes" (video)

12-inch single 1

1. "Pretty Green Eyes" (extended mix) – 6:55
2. "Pretty Green Eyes" (CJ Stone remix) – 7:52
3. "Pretty Green Eyes" (Flip & Fill remix) – 5:48

12-inch single 2

1. "Pretty Green Eyes" (CJ Stone remix) – 7:52
2. "Pretty Green Eyes" (extended mix) – 6:55
3. "Pretty Green Eyes" (N-Trance edit)

=== Personnel ===
Ultrabeat

- Mike Di Scala – vocals, producer
- Ian Redman – producer
- Chris Henry – producer

Other personnel

- Ignition – design

=== Charts ===
==== Weekly charts ====
Chart (2003–2004)	Peak position
Australia (ARIA)	102
Belgium (Ultratip Bubbling Under Flanders)	6
Belgium Dance (Ultratop Flanders)	28
Europe (Eurochart Hot 100)	10
Hungary (Dance Top 40)	30
Ireland (IRMA)	7
Ireland Dance (IRMA)	1
Netherlands (Dutch Top 40)	28
Netherlands (Single Top 100)	37
Scotland (OCC)	1
UK Singles (OCC)	2
UK Dance (OCC)	4

==== Year-end charts ====
Chart (2003)	Position
Ireland (IRMA)	54
UK Singles (OCC)	24

=== Certifications ===
Region	Certification	Certified units/sales
United Kingdom (BPI)	2× Platinum	1,200,000^{‡}
^{‡} Sales+streaming figures based on certification alone.
