= Sy & Unknown =

British happy hardcore music duo

- Genre: happy hardcore
- Years active: c. 1994-2010
- Members: Simon Cranny, Chris Sargent

Sy & Unknown is a British happy hardcore music duo composed of Simon Cranny (DJ Sy) and Chris Sargent (Unknown) mainly active between 1994 and 2010.

== History ==
Simon Cranny, also known as DJ Sy, and Chris Sargent, better known as Unknown or Chris Unknown, met in the mid-90s and joined forces as hardcore duo Sy & Unknown. They also formed record label Quosh Records, on which they also released their own productions. Quosh was a noted happy hardcore label of the 1990s. In 1995, the duo released one of their best known tracks, "Techno Harmony". Re-released in 2003, it was reviewed by Upfront magazine as "pleasing to the ear of the gurning, stomp obsessed raver".

In 1997 the duo contributed two mixes to the compilation album Best of British Happy Hardcore, which charted on the UK Compilation Chart. In 2000 the duo released album The World of Sy & Unknown, a compilation of their better known tracks, which received a 4* staff review by Allmusic. Both Sy and Chris Unknown have separately produced mixes for the Bonkers compilation series. In 2003 Sy & Unknown released "Product of the Devil", which several years later charted on the UK Independent Singles in a release with Force & Styles. In 2006 they mixed one of the CDs on the Hardcore Euphoria compilation album. It peaked at number 9 on the UK Compilation Chart.

In 2010 the duo performed a mix on the BBC Radio 1 Kutski show.

== Discography ==
Singles
Title	Year	Peak UK Ind	Notes
"Are You Ready"	1994		
"Dream Surprise"	1997		
"Listen to the Ace"	1998		
"Techno Harmony"	1995/2003		
"I feel on fire"	2005	49	
"Pacific Sun" / "Product of the Devil"	2006	49	with Force & Styles
