= Scott Brown (DJ) =

Scottish DJ & music producer (born 1972)

- Also known as: DJ Scott Brown, Plus System, The Scotchman
- Born: Scott Alexander Brown; 28 December 1972 (age 53); Glasgow, Scotland
- Genres: Hardcore techno; gabber; UK hardcore; happy hardcore
- Instruments: Turntables, keyboards, drum machines, samplers
- Years active: 1991-present
- Labels: Evolution Records, Mokum Records
- Website: www.evolutionrecords.net

Scott Alexander Brown (born 28 December 1972) is a Scottish disc jockey and music producer, now living in Huddersfield, West Yorkshire. Brown produces and plays a variety of genres, although he is most associated with bouncy techno. His music ranges from happy hardcore, through hard trance, to gabber. He is the founder of Evolution Records, which started in 1994.

== Music production ==
Brown has produced music on his own record labels (Evolution Records, Evolution Plus, Evolved, Evolution Gold, Poosh, Screwdriver and Twisted Vinyl), and under a range of monikers including Plus System, The Scotchman, Interstate, Bass-X (with his brother Stewart), and with his band Q-Tex, which was formed in 1991.

== Releases and album appearances ==
Brown's tracks and mixing has been featured on several releases of the Bonkers compilation series. Brown has also appeared on the compilation albums of Dancemania's Speed series. His first appearance on the series was on the third issue of the series in 1999. He later appeared on Trance Ravers.

=== Other ===
Scott Brown - "Elysium"
29 second sample from Scott Brown's "Elysium".

In November 1996 Brown performed a Peel Session on BBC Radio 1. In 2005, his release "Elysium" was given a trance remix by Liverpool dance trio Ultrabeat featuring vocals by Rebecca Rudd. This version was released with a subtitle as "Elysium (I Go Crazy)" to signal the addition of vocals. The single peaked at #35 in the UK Singles Chart. Later, in May, his song "Go Berzerk" was included in the PlayStation 2 release of Beatmania IIDX 11 IIDXRED, which was not present on the arcade version or audio releases of the game.

In 2008, Brown released a new song, album and DVD called Livewired. In 2009 two of Brown's tracks, "Commence (Sy & Unknown Mix)" and "Digital Distortion Works!" (A collaboration between Brown and Neophyte) were featured on an episode of Top Gear in which Richard Hammond and Jeremy Clarkson glues a CD into James May’s car stereo system as well as gluing the volume knob at maximum, leaving James unable to turn the volume down or take the CD out.

In March 2016, Brown collaborated with German Eurodance DJ and producer Special D. to create a new, updated version of "Elysium", also featuring Rebecca Rudd's vocals from Ultrabeat's version. It was released over two digital EPs featuring remixes from several artists, including a UK Hardcore remix by Scott Brown himself which contains samples and inspiration from Brown's original 1999 version.

== Discography ==
Studio albums

- The Theory of Evolution (1996)
- Future Progression (1999)
- Livewired (2008)
