= Mark Breeze =

British musician and disc jockey

- Also known as: DJ Breeze
- Born: Mark Brady; 1970 (age 55–56); London, England
- Genres: Happy hardcore, UK hardcore
- Occupations: DJ, producer
- Years active: 1996–present
- Labels: Essential Platinum (1996); Happy Hardca$h (1999); Infinity Recordings (1998–2004); Futureworld (2005–present)
- Website: https://www.activetalentagency.com/roster/mark-breeze/

Mark Breeze (real name Mark Brady, born 1970), also known as DJ Breeze, is a British DJ and producer of UK hardcore music. He is best known for his collaborations with Darren Styles as Styles & Breeze and the compilation mix series Clubland X-Treme Hardcore. He is also the founder of the label Infinity Recordings, running it from 1997 to 2003, when DJ Silver took over its operations.

== Discography ==
=== Singles ===
- "Let Me Fly" (2002) - UK #59
- "Chemical Love" (2003) - UK #92
- "You're Shining" (2004) - UK #19
- "Heartbeatz" (2004) - UK #16
