= Ultrabeat =

British electronic music group

- Also known as: Hi-Flyerz, WTF!, Steampunk
- Origin: Liverpool, England
- Genres: Electronic, trance, house, dance, happy hardcore
- Years active: 2002–present
- Label: All Around the World
- Members: Chris Henry; Ian Redman; Frankie Fairbairn; TeknoKat; Rebecca Rudd
- Past members: Danny Penquet, Mike Di Scala

Ultrabeat are a British electronic dance music group from Liverpool, England, formed in 2002. Originally consisting of vocalist and producer Mike "Re-Con" Di Scala and producers Ian Redman and Chris Henry, Ultrabeat emerged with their cover of the Force & Styles song "Pretty Green Eyes", which peaked at number two on the UK Singles Chart 2003. With the addition of vocalist Rebecca Rudd in 2005, they released further singles, including top forty hits such as "Feelin' Fine", "Better than Life" and "Elysium (I Go Crazy)", followed by their début album Ultrabeat: The Album in 2007, which peaked at number eight on the UK Albums Chart

In 2008, Ultrabeat released "Discolights" with collaborators Darren Styles and Danny P, which peaked at number 23 on the UK Singles Chart. Their second album, released in 2009, The Weekend Has Landed, peaked at number 29 on the UK Albums Chart.

Di Scala left the group in 2013 to focus on his new band CamelPhat with Dave Whelan, and Rudd took over as the lead vocalist.

== History ==
=== 2002–2003: Formation and early recordings ===
Prior to forming Ultrabeat, Mike Di Scala, Chris Henry and Ian Redman were DJ’s (Disc Jockey’s) in Liverpool and mixed in the same circle of friends. With a common interest in late-1990s happy hardcore music, the group decided to enter studio for recording sessions. Initially, their productions were bootleg versions of old happy hardcore tracks recorded in order to improve their DJ sets. In 2002 Ultrabeat produced their first remixes and the first record by the group was a double A-side 12-inch single "Sonic Burnin'"/"Boomcore" released on label BCD Records in January 2003. The Ultrabeat name originated from Scottish DJ group Ultrasonic and Boomcore’s let the beat go boom line. Di Scala was previously a member of Rezonance Q, who had chart success with their cover of "Someday" by Mariah Carey. Di Scala played his record label Ultrabeat's demo of "Pretty Green Eyes", a cover of Force & Styles, and following this they were also signed by the label.

=== 2003–2013: The Re-Con era ===
"Pretty Green Eyes" went on to peak at Number #2 on the UK Singles Chart in August 2003, behind "Breathe" by Blu Cantrell featuring Sean Paul. It was playlisted on most radio stations including BBC Radio 1, and was performed live on Top of the Pops. The following single was "Feelin' Fine" which peaked at number twelve on the UK Singles Chart in December 2003. Their next release was "Better Than Life", which was issued the following year and peaked at number twenty three on the UK Singles Chart.

Their next single, "Feel It with Me", was released ten months after "Better than Life", and peaked at number fifty five on the UK Singles Chart in 2005. An album (originally titled Better than Life: The Album) was expected to be released around this time, although this never materialised.

In 2005, vocalist Rebecca Rudd joined the group. Her first track with Ultrabeat titled "Elysium (I Go Crazy) which sampled Scott Brown's "Elysium", reached #38 in the UK charts. "Elysium (I Go Crazy)" was played on TV music channels more frequently than "Feel It with Me" and was voted number one on MTV's 'Galaxy Chart'.

Their sixth single was a collaboration with Darren Styles, "Sure Feels Good", and was released in August 2007. It peaked at number fifty one on the UK Singles Chart. It was the second single featuring Rudd and along with "Elysium (I Go Crazy)" was the second collaboration with another hardcore artist. In September 2007 the band released their album, Ultrabeat: The Album, which peaked at number eight on the UK Albums Chart. At that time band undertook a national tour in support of Cascada (who are also on the AATW label). Their seventh single, "I Wanna Touch You", was released on 4 February 2008.

A new single "Discolights" was released in June 2008. An original release date of 12 January 2009 was set for the second album The Weekend Has Landed, but despite this, it has been leaked onto the internet on various file sharing platforms.

The first single from the album was Discolights. It peaked at number twenty three on the UK Singles Chart. The second single from the album was Never Ever, which did not achieve a peak on the UK Singles Charts. The third single was Starry Eyed Girl, which, like the majority of the album, did not achieve a peak on the UK Singles Chart, and the fourth is Use Somebody, a cover of Kings of Leon's track from their multi-platinum album Only by the Night. The album was released on 26 October 2009 and includes 18 tracks plus a chronology DVD of all of their music videos, including Pretty Green Eyes, Feelin' Fine, The Stalker, Discolights and more.

Following The Weekend Has Landed album, Ultrabeat released three singles, "Bring It Back", "You Will See" and "Rising". A new song "Rain Stops" written by the late MC Junior appeared on Clubland X-Treme Hardcore 9 in 2013, and Di Scala left the group that same year to focus on his other band CamelPhat with Dave Whelan, and was replaced by Rudd permanently on lead vocals.

=== Other projects ===
The group produced a track called "Pumpanola" using the alias Hi-Flyerz which appeared on Clubland X-Treme in 2003. In 2012, they had a hit single with "Da Bop" using the alias WTF!, which samples the 1967 song "Our Neighbour" (Russian: "Наш сосед" nash sosed) by Russian singer Edita Piekha. Two songs recorded by the group using the name Steampunk, "Loki's Theme" and "Forever Loved", appeared on Clubland X-Treme Hardcore 9 in 2013.

Di Scala, Henry and Lee Butler recorded using several aliases such as 3 Amigos, King of Clubs and The Tranceriffs on BCD Records. Di Scala left the group in 2013, to focus on his new band CamelPhat with Dave Whelan, for which he formed in 2006. Chris Henry and Mike Di Scala have also recorded using the name M&C Project, releasing songs "Coming Back" (2005), a cover of Siedah Garrett's "Do You Want It Right Now" (2006) and "Magic Touch" (2007). Chris Henry is also a member of N-Force, with Lois McConnell and Jorg Schmid.

== Members ==
- Chris Henry – disc jockey, producer (2002–present)
- Ian Redman – disc jockey, producer (2002–present)
- Mike "Re-Con" Di Scala – vocals, disc jockey, producer (2002–2013)
- Rebecca Rudd - vocals (2005−present)

== Discography ==
=== Studio albums ===
Title	Album details	Peak chart positions		Certifications
Title	Album details	UK	IRE	Certifications
Ultrabeat: The Album	Released: 10 September 2007; Label: All Around the World; Formats: CD, digital download	8	51	BPI: Gold
The Weekend Has Landed	Released: 26 October 2009; Label: All Around the World, Universal Music TV; Formats: CD+DVD, digital download	29	—	BPI: Silver
"—" denotes releases that did not chart or were not released in that country.

=== Singles ===
Title	Year	Peak chart positions								Certifications	Album
Title	Year	UK	UK Dance	AUS	AUT	BEL	IRE	NL	SCO	Certifications	Album
"Sonic Burnin'" / "Boomcore"	2003	—	—	—	—	—	—	—	—		Non-album single
"Pretty Green Eyes"	2003	2	1	102	—	56	7	37	1	BPI: 2× Platinum	Ultrabeat: The Album
"Feelin' Fine"	2003	12	1	—	—	—	26	35	8	BPI: Silver	Ultrabeat: The Album
"Better than Life"	2004	23	2	—	—	65	34	51	15		Ultrabeat: The Album
"Feel It with Me"	2005	57	3	—	—	—	—	—	37		Ultrabeat: The Album
"Elysium (I Go Crazy)" (vs. Scott Brown)	2006	35	4	153	—	—	40	—	13	BPI: Silver	Ultrabeat: The Album
"Sure Feels Good" (vs. Darren Styles)	2007	52	5	—	—	—	—	—	24		Ultrabeat: The Album
"I Wanna Touch You"	2008	—	—	—	—	—	—	—	—		Ultrabeat: The Album
"Discolights" (vs. Darren Styles)	2008	23	2	—	—	—	28	—	4		The Weekend Has Landed
"Never Ever"	2009	—	—	—	—	—	—	—	—		The Weekend Has Landed
"Starry Eyed Girl"	2009	—	—	—	—	—	—	—	—		The Weekend Has Landed
"Use Somebody"	2009	100	40	—	—	—	—	—	—		The Weekend Has Landed
"Bring It Back"	2011	—	—	—	—	—	—	—	—		Non-album singles
"You Will See" (vs. Hypasonic)	2012	—	—	—	—	—	—	—	—		Non-album singles
"Da Bop" (as WTF!)	2012	—	—	—	63	—	—	4	—		Non-album singles
"The Sway" (as WTF!)	2012	—	—	—	—	—	—	—	—		Non-album singles
"Rising"	2012	—	—	—	—	—	—	—	—		Non-album singles
"Pretty Green Eyes 2013"	2013	—	—	—	—	—	—	—	—		Non-album singles
"Hallelujah"	2020	—	—	—	—	—	—	—	—		Non-album singles
"Livin On A Prayer" [featuring Flip & Fill]	2023										Non-album single
"—" denotes a recording that did not chart or was not released in that territory.

=== Remixes ===
Title	Year	Artist(s)
"Loud and Proud" (Ultrabeat remix)	2002	Brooklyn Bounce
"I Believe in Love" (Ultrabeat remix)	2002	Cooper
"See Me Here" (Ultrabeat remix)	2002	Orion
"When I Call Your Name" (Ultrabeat remix)	2003	Haifa
"If You Leave Me Now" (Ultrabeat remix)	2003	The System presents Kerri B
"Crazy Sexy Marvellous" (Ultrabeat remix)	2003	Paffendorf
"(I Just) Died in Your Arms" (Ultrabeat remix)	2003	Resource
"I'll Be Your Angel" (Ultrabeat remix)	2003	Kira
"Magic Fly" (Ultrabeat remix)	2003	Minimalistix
"Overload" (Ultrabeat remix)	2003	VooDoo & Serano
"Passion" (Ultrabeat remix)	2003	Amen! UK
"Maria (I Like It Loud)" (Ultrabeat remix)	2003	Scooter vs. Marc Acardipane & Dick Rules
"Come & Fly with Me" (Ultrabeat remix)	2003	Element
"Paradise & Dreams" (Ultrabeat remix)	2003	The Force
"Welcome to Tomorrow" (Ultrabeat remix)	2003	Miss Peppermint
"Irish Blue" (Ultrabeat remix)	2004	Flip & Fill featuring Junior
"Look at Us" (Ultrabeat remix)	2004	Northern Heightz
"Come into My Dream" (Ultrabeat remix)	2004	Foggy
"It's Over Now" (Ultrabeat remix)	2005	Big Ang featuring Siobhan
"Easy" (Ultrabeat remix)	2006	Sugababes
"I Will Love Again" (Ultrabeat remix)	2007	Kelly Llorenna
"Rise Again" (Ultrabeat remix)	2007	Breeze vs. Lost Witness
"About You Now" (Ultrabeat remix)	2007	Sugababes
"Show Me Heaven" (Ultrabeat remix)	2007	Micky Modelle vs. Jessy
"What Hurts the Most" (Ultrabeat remix)	2007	Cascada
"Headbone Connected" (Ultrabeat remix)	2007	Maximum Spell
"Piece of Heaven" (Ultrabeat remix)	2008	Beatplayers featuring Lara McAllen
"Right by Your Side" (Ultrabeat remix)	2008	N-Force vs. Darren Styles
"Gotta Tell You" (Ultrabeat remix)	2008	Micky Modelle vs. Samantha Mumba
"What Is Happening" (Alphabeat vs. Ultrabeat)	2008	Alphabeat
"True Faith" (Ultrabeat remix)	2008	Liz Kay
"Burning Love" (Ultrabeat remix)	2008	Katie Jewels
"Hold Me Tonight" (Ultrabeat remix)	2008	Manian
"Apologize" (Ultrabeat remix)	2008	Dee Grees vs. The Real Booty Babes
"Everywhere" (Ultrabeat remix)	2009	Master Blaster
"Blade (Phatt Bass)" (Ultrabeat remix)	2009	Ali Payami vs. Aquagen featuring Warp Brothers
"Strong Again" (Ultrabeat remix)	2009	N-Dubz
"I'll Be There" (Ultrabeat remix)	2009	Stunt
"Evacuate the Dancefloor" (Ultrabeat remix)	2009	Cascada
"Fight for this Love" (Ultrabeat remix)	2009	Cheryl Cole
"Boys and Girls" (Ultrabeat remix)	2009	Pixie Lott
"Do You Know" (Ultrabeat remix)	2009	eSQUIRE & Di Scala featuring Ruth Cullen
"If You Were Mine" (Ultrabeat remix)	2009	Alex K
"Sound without a Name" (Ultrabeat remix)	2010	Darren Styles
"Broken Arrow" (Ultrabeat remix)	2010	Pixie Lott
"Together" (Ultrabeat remix)	2010	Pet Shop Boys
"Girls" (Ultrabeat remix)	2011	N-Dubz
"30 Days" (Ultrabeat remix)	2012	The Saturdays

=== Music videos ===
Title	Year	Director(s)
"Pretty Green Eyes"	2003	Jamie Balliu
"Feelin' Fine"	2003	
"Better than Life"	2004	Tom King
"Feel It with Me"	2005	Tom King
"Elysium (I Go Crazy)" (vs. Scott Brown)	2006	Mike Cockayne
"Sure Feels Good" (vs. Darren Styles)	2007	Kevin Hewitt
"Megamix"	2007	Various
"I Wanna Touch You"	2007	Kevin Hewitt
"Discolights" (vs. Darren Styles)	2008	Paul Boyd
"Never Ever"	2008	Andy Soup
"The Stalker"	2009	Iain Titterington
"Starry Eyed Girl"	2009	
"Don't Wanna Let Go" (vs. Darren Styles)	2009	Michael Holdaway
"Use Somebody"	2009	Graham Hector
"Megamix Part 2"	2010	Various
"Bring It Back"	2010	
"Waiting for a Girl Like You"	2011	
"Da Bop" (as WTF!)	2012	
"The Sway" (as WTF!)	2012	Lina Schütze
"Rising"	2012	Ben Peters
