= Darren Styles =

British musician (born 1975)

- Also known as: Darren Styles, Unique
- Born: Darren James Mew; 23 May 1975 (age 51); London, England, United Kingdom
- Genres: UK hardcore, trance, hardstyle
- Occupations: Record producer; DJ; singer-songwriter; manager
- Instruments: Vocals; keyboards; turntables; music sequencer; sampler; drum programming
- Years active: 1993–present
- Labels: Universal Records; UK Dance; Raver Baby; All Around the World; Junkbox; Together We Rise; Dirty Workz; Monstercat
- Website: darrenstyles.co.uk

Darren James Mew (born 23 May 1975), better known as Darren Styles, is an English music producer, DJ, singer and songwriter from Clacton-On-Sea, Essex. Originally a member of the breakbeat hardcore group DJ Force & the Evolution, Styles found success during the 1990s as one half of Force & Styles. The duo were pioneers of happy hardcore and wrote several well-known songs such as "Heart of Gold", "Pretty Green Eyes" and "Paradise & Dreams".

In the early 2000s, Styles began producing more trance-influenced records with Mark Brady as Styles & Breeze. The duo released two hit singles "You're Shining" (2002) and "Heartbeatz" (2003) which both reached the top 20 of the UK Singles Chart. They have been involved in all volumes of the popular Clubland X-Treme Hardcore compilation series. Darren Styles also has a collab alias with Stonebank called "Zero Hero", which was discontinued after the release of "Twilight" included in Rocket League x Monstercat Vol. 1, decided to continue to collaborate with their own names.

As a solo artist, Styles has released two studio albums, the gold-selling Skydivin' (2008) and Feel the Pressure (2010). He has also frequently collaborated with several other artists such as Hixxy, Ultrabeat and N-Force.

== Early life ==
Styles was born as Darren James Mew in London, England. He was encouraged to play music from an early age by his father, a blues fan, and always had a passion for music. His family moved to Clacton-On-Sea in Essex when he was 7 years old. He spent many nights mastering his ability on the keyboard and developing his own style, inspired by dance music. In February 1992, Styles had his first "hands on" experience of the underground rave scene in "Oscar's Nightclub" on Clacton Pier. This event lead to him wanting to be a part of the dance music community.

== Force & Styles ==
His first records were as part of the breakbeat hardcore group DJ Force & The Evolution (with Force, Jamie Ritmen, and Paul Hughes) released in 1993. The group signed to hardcore record label Kniteforce and many of their tracks were played by Carl Cox. The group also produced tracks using the alias A Sense of Summer for another hardcore label Universal Records owned by Slipmatt.

In 1995, he and Hobbs set up their own label UK Dance Records so they could quickly release more material and have complete artistic licence over their records. They began producing using the alias Force & Styles and released many 12-inch records on UK Dance and by 1996 their popularity had grown so that they were DJing every weekend up and down the UK, as well as touring Australia, North America, and Ibiza on a regular basis. The two also held residencies at various events including those by Slammin Vinyl, Helter Skelter and United Dance.

By 1997, they had produced some of the biggest happy hardcore tracks of the time, many of which went on to be covered by commercial dance artists, including singles "Heart of Gold", "Paradise & Dreams", "Pretty Green Eyes", "Pacific Sun" and "Field of Dreams". Force & Styles picked up many awards at this time and they were the first ever hardcore DJs to do a guest mix for Pete Tong's Essential Mix radio show on BBC Radio 1.

Force & Styles released three albums: All over the UK (1996), Simply Electric (1998) - a compilation of tracks by DJ Force & The Evolution and Force & Styles - and their greatest hits album Heart of Gold (2000).

== Solo career ==
Styles' first record that he provided vocals on was "Feelin' Fine" which was released under the alias Unique in 1998. Even though this was his first solo track, Force is credited on an edit released later that year as the 'Force & Styles Remix', which has been known as the 12" mix by some. His solo career as Darren Styles officially started around 2002 after releasing a record for Nukleuz and other labels. He has also released many records on Raver Baby and his first solo single was "Save Me" released on All Around the World in 2006.

In 2005, Styles partnered with Hixxy to follow up the Bonkers series by initiating a popular compilation mix series called Clubland X-Treme Hardcore, several releases of which attained BRIT Certified Gold status. Fellow artist MC Storm claimed the series to be "another massive turning point for hardcore".

Styles has released singles collaborating with other artists on tracks such as "Sure Feels Good" and "Discolights" with Ultrabeat and "Right by Your Side" with N-Force. In 2008, he released Skydivin'. The album was a collection of old and new hardcore and commercial songs. This album reached No. 4 in the UK, # 41 in Ireland and has since been certified Gold in the UK. His follow-up single to "Discolights" with Ultrabeat was the song "Girls Like You" with Dougal and Kenny Hayes, released 2 February 2009 under the alias United In Dance (formed of Styles, Dougal, and Gammer). He created Junkbox Records in 2006 which has released a number of singles.

In June and July 2009, Styles and Ultrabeat embarked on a ten-date UK-wide co-headlined tour, accompanied by Breeze, Infextious, DJ Frisco, MC Domino, Rebecca Rudd (Ultrabeat's current lead vocalist replacing Re-Con after his departure in 2013) and N-Force. Starting in Sheffield, the tour went to Liverpool, Birmingham, Bristol, Dublin, Belfast, Glasgow, Newcastle, Manchester and London. In late November and early December 2009, Styles was part of Clubland Live 3 which toured through England, Scotland and Ireland.

Styles' most recent album Feel the Pressure was released on 23 August 2010, and features the singles "Outta My Head", "Sound Without a Name" and "Holding On".

== Personal life ==
Styles is married to Fiona Merry who appeared on the 2007 edition of the reality television series Shipwrecked. Merry also provided the voiceover for the intro to Clubland X-Treme Hardcore 4 in December 2007.

== Discography ==
- Skydivin' (2008)
- Feel the Pressure (2010)
