= Xploded Music =

British electronic music record label

AATW/Xploded Music
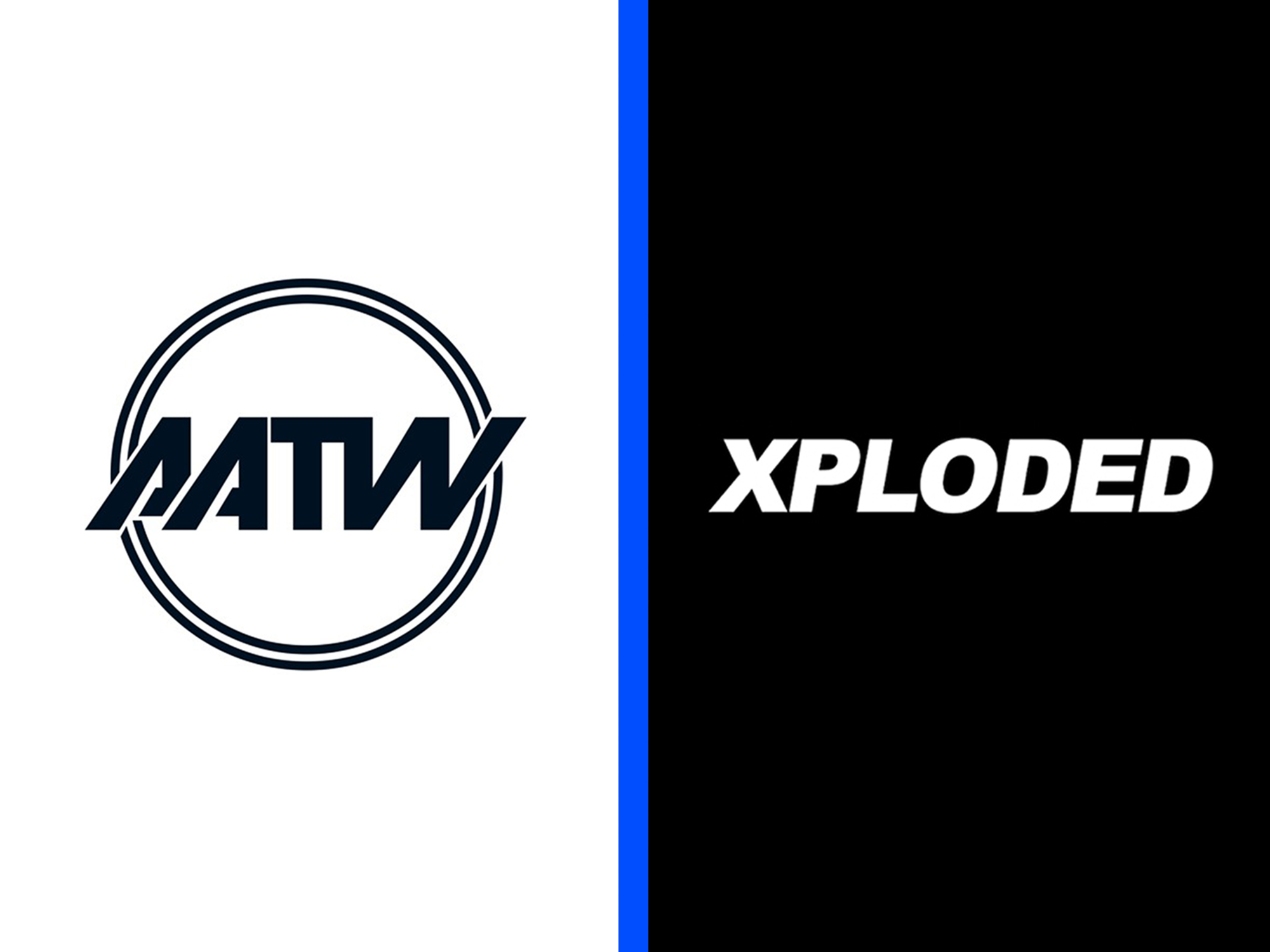
- Parent company: Universal Music Group
- Founded: 1991; 35 years ago
- Founder: Cris Nuttall; Matt Cadman
- Status: Inactive (AATW), Active (Xploded Music)
- Distributor: Universal Music Distribution
- Genre: Various
- Country of origin: England, UK
- Location: Blackburn, England, UK
- Official website: www.xploded.co.uk

Xploded Music is a British record label set up by Cris Nuttall and Matt Cadman. The label is a joint venture with Universal, and has developed from their previous partnership with the All Around the World dance music label. All Around the World (also known as AATW) originated in Blackburn and has had success with artists such as N-Trance, Cascada, Scooter, Dannii Minogue, Armin van Buuren, Lost Frequencies, N-Dubz, Loud Luxury, Skepta, Starley, Yolanda Be Cool, and many more. AATW also owned & operated four music TV channels; Clubland TV, and three Now Music-branded channels - Now 70s, Now 80s and Now 90s, all of which are now fully owned by Universal.

== History ==
=== All Around the World ===
All Around the World was founded in 1991 in Blackburn, Lancashire by record store owner and former Phonogram employee Cris Nutall, who decided to team up with former BMG employee Matt Cadman to launch the label. Throughout the 1990s, AATW established an abundance of British electronic music acts including Love Decade, 2 Funky 2, Bus Stop, Porn Kings and N-Trance - who achieved a number two UK single with their track "Set You Free" on the label in 1995.

The 2000s saw the label expand under the management of John Donaghey with the signing and development of artists such as Flip & Fill, Ultrabeat, Cascada, Dannii Minogue, Scooter, Darren Styles, N-Dubz, Skepta and many more. During the early 2000s, AATW also founded the long-standing Clubland compilation album series, as well as various other branded compilation titles released in partnership with UMTV/ UMOD. Other compilation series' included Rock the Dancefloor, Floorfillers, Ultimate Club Anthems, Love2Club, 100% Chilled, Ultimate NRG and Dance Mania.

In March 2008, AATW organised a series of Clubland arena events, followed by a second tour, Clubland Live 2, which took place in December 2008 and a third in 2010.

In 2012, AATW became more strongly integrated with Universal's compilation division UMTV as Nuttall and Cadman became the joint Managing Directors of the division, a role which saw them overseeing the Pop Party, Dreamboats & Petticoats and NOW compilation brands.

=== Xploded Music ===
In 2017, AATW founders Cris Nuttall and Matt Cadman sold the record label and Clubland branding to Universal with the duo staying on at the label for another year until their new label Xploded Music, was ready to launch. In 2018, Xploded Music launched with many of the AATW staff, including A&R Manager James Hill, keeping their roles at the new imprint, and artists such as N-Dubz and Darren Styles staying with Nuttall and Cadman as well as releasing music from new signings such as; Loud Luxury, Armin van Buuren, Sam Ryder, Ben Nicky, Timmy Trumpet, PBH & JACK, MENTIS and more.

Since 2021, the AATW brand has been discontinued by Universal with the TV Channels broadcasting licences transferring fully into the hands of Universal. In 2022, late 2000s AATW-signed act N-Dubz released their comeback single after 11 years away. with the single, called "Charmer", getting the label's first Top 40 hit.

== Former television channels ==
On 28 January 2008, All Around the World launched their own TV channel, Clubland TV. The channel broadcasts official music videos and acted as a platform for emerging dance and pop music artists as well as featuring programmes focused around bygone eras. Primarily the channel broadcasts dance music videos.

As of 2022, Clubland TV focuses only on throwback dance music, as the sale of AATW and the channel to UMOD meant many of the partnerships with other record labels ended, making it more difficult for the channel to have rights to play new music.

All Around the World also owned three other music TV channels, branded in partnership with Now Music.

- Now 70s
- Now 80s
- Now 90s

In 2017, following the sale of AATW, all of the channels were acquired by Universal, who continue to broadcast the channels on Sky and Virgin Media.

== Former highlighted roster ==
- Loud Luxury
- Sigma
- ATB
- Avicii
- Armin Van Buuren
- Abra Cadabra
- Agnes
- Axwell
- Alexandra Stan
- Basshunter
- Cascada
- Cash Cash
- Dannii Minogue
- Dappy
- Darren Styles
- Icona Pop
- Liz McClarnon
- Lost Frequencies
- Martin Solveig
- N-Dubz
- N-Trance
- Professor Green
- Pixie Lott
- Petra Marklund
- Scooter
- Showtek
- Skepta
- Sweet Female Attitude
- Starley
- Thomas Gold
- Tulisa
- Ultrabeat
- Wideboys

== See also ==
- Lists of record labels
- List of electronic music record labels
