= Slander discography =

This is the discography of American electronic music duo Slander.

== Studio albums ==
Title	Details
Thrive	Released: September 22, 2022; Label: Self-released; Format: Digital download

== Extended plays ==
Title	Details
Nuclear Bonds (with Nghtmre)	Released: October 13, 2015; Label: Mad Decent; Format: Digital download
Duality	Released: November 18, 2016; Label: Mad Decent; Format: Digital download
Dilapidation Celebration (with Kayzo)	Released: October 27, 2017; Label: Monstercat; Format: Digital download
The Headbangers Ball	Released: November 30, 2018; Label: Monstercat; Format: Digital download

== Singles ==
List of singles as lead artists, with selected chart positions and certifications, showing year released and album name
Title	Year	Peak chart positions	Certifications	Album
Title	Year	US Dance	Certifications	Album
"Gettin Down" (with Kayzo)	2013	—		Non-album single
"Ascensions" (with Nghtmre)	2014	—		Excision 2015 Mix Compilation
"Vanguard"	2014	—		Non-album single
"Gud Vibrations"	2015	—		Nuclear Bonds
"Love Again" (featuring Wavz)	2015	—		Duality
"You" (with Nghtmre)	2015	—		Nuclear Bonds
"Power" (with Nghtmre)	2015	—		Nuclear Bonds
"Warning" (with Nghtmre)	2015	—		Nuclear Bonds
"After All" (with Yookie featuring Jinzo)	2016	—		Non-album single
"Breathe" (with Adam K featuring Matthew Steeper and Haliene)	2016	—		Non-album single
"Drop It" (with Basstrick)	2017	—		Non-album single
"Superhuman" (featuring Eric Leva)	2017	—		Monstercat Uncaged Vol. 2
"Welcome to the Fire" (with Sullivan King)	2017	—		Non-album single
"Happy Now"	2018	—		Monstercat Instinct, Vol. 1
"Move Back" (with Wavedash)	2018	—		EDC Las Vegas 2018
"Slow Motion" (with Bret James)	2018	—		Monstercat Instinct, Vol. 1
"So Long" (featuring Juliana Chahayed)	2018	—		Monstercat Instinct, Vol. 2
"Kneel Before Me" (with Crankdat featuring Asking Alexandria)	2018	—		Monstercat Uncaged, Vol. 5
"You Don't Even Know Me" (with Riot)	2018	—		The Headbangers Ball
"First Time" (with Seven Lions and Dabin featuring Dylan Matthew)	2018	41		10 Years of Seven Lions
"Running To You" (with Spag Heddy featuring Elle Vee)	2018	—		The Headbangers Ball
"Hate Being Alone" (featuring Dylan Matthew)	2018	—		The Headbangers Ball
"All You Need to Know" (with Gryffin featuring Calle Lehmann)	2019	12	RIAA: Gold	Gravity
"Love Is Gone" (featuring Dylan Matthew)	2019	45	RIAA: Platinum	Thrive
"Potions" (with Said the Sky featuring JT Roach)	2019	—		Monstercat Instinct, Vol. 4
"Broken" (with Kompany featuring Fknsyd)	2019	—		Non-album single
"Feeling Gud" (with Nghtmre)	2020	34		Gud Vibrations: Volume 2
"Back To U" (with William Black)	2020	47		Gud Vibrations: Volume 2
"Better Than Heaven" (with Jason Ross featuring JT Roach)	2020	—		Gud Vibrations: Volume 2
"Blood On Me" (with Svdden Death)	2020	36		Gud Vibrations: Volume 2
"Hurts Sometimes" (with Fairlane featuring Jonathan Mendelsohn)	2020	—		Heaven Sent Vol. 1
"Your Fault" (with Excision featuring Elle Vee)	2020	39		Non-album single
"Anywhere" (with Au5 featuring Shybeast and Plya)	2021	29		Heaven Sent Vol. 1
"When I'm With You" (with Synymata and Neverwaves)	2021	—		Non-album single
"Lay It Down" (with Illenium and Krewella)	2021	19		Fallen Embers
"Gravity" (with Subtronics and JT Roach)	2021	35		Gud Vibrations: Volume 3
"Miss You" (with Ganja White Night)	2021	45		Gud Vibrations: Volume 3
"Suffer" (with Marauda and Elle Vee)	2021	—		Gud Vibrations: Volume 3
"Getting Late" (with If Found featuring Danni Carra)	2022	28		Non-album single
"Fall Into Me" (with Nghtmre featuring Dylan Matthew)	2022	33		Drmvrse
"Walk on Water" (with RØRY and Dylan Matthew)	2022	31		Thrive
"Halfway Down" (with Ashley Drake)	2022	—		Thrive
"Replay" (with Dylan Matthew)	2022	—		Thrive
"Picture" (with Said the Sky and Alison Wonderland)	2022	18		Non-album single
"Wish I Could Forget" (with Blackbear and Bring Me the Horizon)	2023	19		Non-album single
"Love Is Gone" (with Joshua of SEVENTEEN)	2025	—		Non-album single
"Love Is Gone" (with Joshua of SEVENTEEN and Dylan Matthew)	2025	—		Non-album single
"Broken Hearted" (with San Holo featuring Julia Church)	2025	—		Non-album single
"Under My Skin" (with Spiritbox and Vastive)	2026	—		Non-album single
"—" denotes a recording that did not chart or was not released in that territory.

== Remixes ==
=== 2014 ===
- Ummet Ozcan - "Raise You Hands" (Slander Festival Trap Edit)
- Showtek - "We Like To Party" (SLANDER & NGHTMRE EDIT)
- Above & Beyond (band) - "Love Is Not Enough" (Slander Heaven Trap Edit)
- Jack Ü – "Take Ü There" (Slander Remix)
- Dimitri Vegas & Like Mike and W&W – "Waves" (Slander Remix)
- Arty – "Up All Night" (Slander Remix)
- Bastille – "Pompeii" (Slander Remix)
- Gorgon City – "Here For You" (Slander Remix)
- Sam F featuring The Lonely Island and Lil Jon – "When Will the Bass Drop" (Slander Remix)
- T.I. – "What You Know" (Slander Remix)
- Seven Lions featuring Ellie Goulding – "Don't Leave" (Slander Remix)

=== 2015 ===
- Adele – "Hello" (Slander Remix)
- GTA – "Red Lips" (Slander and Nghtmre Remix)
- Alison Wonderland – "U Don't Know" (Slander Remix)

=== 2016 ===
- Jack Ü – "Mind" (Slander Remix)
- Kill The Noise – "Kill It 4 The Kids" (Slander Remix)
- DJ Snake featuring Justin Bieber – "Let Me Love You" (Slander & B-Sides Remix)

=== 2017 ===
- Halsey – "Now or Never" (Slander Remix)

=== 2018 ===
- Above & Beyond – "Always" (Slander Remix)
- Kill The Noise - "Jump Ya Body" (Slander and Tucker Kreway Remix)

=== 2019 ===
- Excision and Space Laces - "1 On 1" (Slander and Shadient Remix)

=== 2020 ===
- Slander - "Potions" (Slander and Bossfight Remix)
