= Kayzo discography =

This is the discography for American musician Kayzo.

== Studio albums ==
Title	Details
OVERLOAD	Released: January 19, 2018; Label: Ultra Records; Format: Digital download
Unleashed	Released: August 14, 2019; Label: Ultra Records / Welcome Records; Format: Digital download
NEW BREED	Released: June 24, 2022; Label: Welcome Records; Format: Digital download

== Extended plays ==
Title	Details
Fired Up	Released: December 16, 2014; Label: Firepower Records; Format: Digital download
Black & White	Released: November 18, 2016; Label: Barong Family; Format: Digital download
Dilapidation Celebration (with Slander)	Released: October 27, 2017; Label: Monstercat; Format: Digital download
The Year The World Stood Still	Released: September 25, 2020; Label: Welcome Records; Format: Digital download

== Singles ==
=== As lead artist ===
Title	Year	Album
"Creep" (with Neurologix)	2013	Non-album Singles
"Malfunktion 2.0" (featuring Duelle)	2013	Non-album Singles
"Gettin Down" (with SLANDER)	2013	Non-album Singles
"Recoil" (with Jordan Alexander)	2013	Non-album Singles
"Ultrashock"	2014	Non-album Singles
"Crank" (with Seek N Destroy)	2014	Non-album Singles
"Till We Die" (with Sullivan King)	2015	Non-album Singles
"Take a Picture" (with Dotcom featuring Sam King)	2015	Non-album Singles
"Hasselhouse"	2015	Non-album Singles
"Can't Stop"	2016	Non-album Singles
"Smack"	2016	Non-album Singles
"Welcome to the Doghouse"	2016	Non-album Singles
"The Dogs"	2016	Non-album Singles
"Born Again"	2016	Non-album Singles
"Home" (with Cesqeaux)	2016	Non-album Singles
"Frequency" (with Gammer)	2016	Non-album Singles
"Wake Up" (with RIOT)	2017	Non-album Singles
"This Time"	2017	Non-album Singles
"Whistle Wars"	2017	Non-album Singles
"Feel The Power" (featuring Micah Martin)	2017	OVERLOAD
"Over the Edge" (with Gammer featuring Au8ust)	2017	Non-album Singles
"Without You" (with SLANDER featuring Dylan Matthew)	2017	Dilapidation Celebration
"Holy" (with SLANDER featuring Micah Martin)	2017	Dilapidation Celebration
"Overload" (featuring Micah Martin)	2018	OVERLOAD
"Forever" (with Gammer)	2018	Non-album Singles
"Fake Fake Fake" (featuring XO Sad)	2018	Non-album Singles
"Wasted Space" (with Underoath)	2018	Unleashed
"Novocaine" (with Valentino Khan)	2019	Non-album Singles
"Alone" (with Our Last Night)	2019	Unleashed
"Before the Storm" (with Blessthefall)	2019	Unleashed
"Up in Flames" (featuring Alex Gaskarth of All Time Low)	2019	Unleashed
"Night Terror" (with Yultron featuring Of Mice & Men)	2019	Unleashed
"Cruel Love" (featuring Shybeast and Frank Zummo)	2019	Unleashed
"Lights Out"	2019	Non-album Singles
"Braincase" (with Subtronics)	2019	Non-album Singles
"Battle Drums" (with Atreyu)	2020	Non-album Singles
"Rules of the Game" (with Lil Texas)	2020	Non-album Singles
"Ghost in the Bottle" (with Ray Volpe)	2020	Non-album Singles
"Suffocate" (with Bad Omens)	2020	Non-album Singles
"Breakable" (with Graves featuring Jumex)	2020	Non-album Singles
"No Regrets" (with HELLBOUND!)	2020	Non-album Singles
"Spin It Back" (with Calcium)	2020	Non-album Singles
"The Fire" (with Crankdat)	2020	Non-album Singles
"Say It"	2020	The Year The World Stood Still
"Wait" (with Reaper and Qoiet)	2020	The Year The World Stood Still
"Breakdown" (with Syn and Zero 9:36)	2020	The Year The World Stood Still
"Blindside" (with Pixel Terror)	2020	The Year The World Stood Still
"Liar" (with Ost)	2020	Non-album Singles
"Untouchable" (with Brennan Heart)	2020	Non-album Singles
"Tormenta" (with Delta Heavy)	2020	Non-album Singles
"Lifeline" (with Black Tiger Sex Machine featuring Point North)	2021	Non-album Singles
"Never Let You Down" (with Telle)	2021	Non-album Singles
"DOMINATION" (with Sullivan King and Papa Roach)	2021	Non-album Singles
"Poison" (with Paris Shadows)	2021	Non-album Singles
"Replay" (with Whales featuring Shiah Maisel)	2021	Non-album Singles
"The Sickness" (featuring Ghostkid)	2022	NEW BREED
"News Flash" (featuring Kamiyada+)	2022	NEW BREED
"Moonlight" (featuring Siiickbrain)	2022	NEW BREED
"Poser" (featuring conner)	2022	NEW BREED
"Depression Season" (with Atreyu)	2022	Non-album Singles
"Suffocate (VIP)" (with Bad Omens)	2023	Non-album Singles
"Rage" (with SampliFire featuring Scarlxrd and Darko US)	2024	Non-album Singles
"Eyes Wide Xpen" (featuring Scarlxrd)	2024	Non-album Singles
"NMF" (with RIOT)	2024	Non-album Singles
"Forget My Name" (with Kai Wachi featuring CRYBLOOD)	2024	Non-album Singles
"Can't Slow Down" (with Story of the Year)	2024	Non-album Singles
"SWEAT!" (with Sullivan King)	2024	Non-album Singles
"Energy" (with Vastive)	2024	Non-album Singles
"Grave" (with WesGhost)	2025	Non-album Singles
"Kore" (with Nimda)	2025	Non-album Singles
"Back 2 The Rave" (with Must Die!)	2025	Non-album Singles
"Surge"	2025	Non-album Singles
"Berserk" (with SampliFire)	2025	Non-album Singles
"Overload 2K" (featuring Micah Martin)	2025	Non-album Singles
"The Moment"	2025	Non-album Singles

=== As featured artist ===
Title	Year
"Tempura Roll" (Yultron featuring Ookay, Kayzo and Dotcom)	2016

== Remixes ==
2012

- Deorro – Phony (Kayzo Remix)
- Nervo – You're Gonna Love Again (Kayzo Remix)

2013

- Kendrick Lamar - Swimming Pools (Kayzo Remix)
- T-Pain – Buy U A Drank (Kayzo Remix)
- Ying Yang Twins and Lil Jon – Salt Shaker (Kayzo Remix)

2014

- James Egbert – Exit Wounds (featuring Nina Sung) (Kayzo Remix)
- Jack Ü – Take Ü There (featuring Kiesza) (Kayzo Remix)
- Carnage – Bricks (featuring Migos) (Kayzo Remix)
- Oliver Heldens – Gecko (Kayzo Remix)
- Galantis – You (Kayzo Remix)
- Snails and Antiserum – Wild (Kayzo Remix)
- Nero – Satisfy (Kayzo Remix)
- Tchami – Shot Caller (Aylen & Kayzo Remix)
- TLC – No Scrubs (Kayzo Remix)
- DJ Snake and Mercer – Lunatic (Kayzo Remix)
- Above & Beyond – Sun & Moon (Kayzo Remix)
- RL Grime – Core (Kayzo Remix)
- TJR and Vinai – Bounce Generation (Kayzo Remix)

2015

- N.W.A – Fuck tha Police (Kayzo Remix)
- GTA – Red Lips (featuring Sam Bruno) (Kayzo Remix of Skrillex's Remix)
- Knife Party – Boss Mode (Kayzo Remix)
- Alesso – Heroes (We Could Be) (featuring Tove Lo) (Kayzo Remix)
- Calvin Harris and Disciples – How Deep is Your Love (Kayzo Remix)
- KDrew – Let Me Go (Kayzo Remix)

2016

- Porter Robinson – Language (Kayzo and Gammer Remix)
- Skrillex and Rick Ross – Purple Lamborghini (Kayzo Remix)
- Zara Larsson and MNEK – Never Forget You (Carnage and Kayzo Remix)
- DJ Snake and Yellow Claw - Ocho Cinco (Kayzo Remix)
- Tritonal - This Is Love (featuring Chris Ramos and Shanahan) (Kayzo Remix)

2017

- DJ Snake featuring Lauv - A Different Way (Kayzo Remix)

2018

- Papa Roach - Last Resort (Kayzo Remix)

2019

- Yungblud and Halsey featuring Travis Barker - 11 Minutes (Kayzo Remix)
- The Bloody Beetroots - "Warp 2.019" (Steve Aoki and Kayzo Remix)

2021

- Illenium featuring Iann Dior - "First Time" (Kayzo Remix)
- Kayzo and Paris Shadows - "Poison" (Kayzo VIP)
