= Kompany (musician) =

American DJ and producer

Background information
- Born: Kyle Hagberg; October 3, 1991 (age 34); Los Angeles, California, U.S.
- Genres: Dubstep; riddim; trap; bass music
- Occupations: Disc jockey; record producer
- Years active: 2015–present
- Labels: Circus; Disciple; Firepower; Kannibalen; Monstercat; Never Say Die
- Website: www.kompanymusic.com

Kyle Hagberg (born October 3, 1991), better known by his stage name Kompany, is a Los Angeles-based dubstep producer and DJ. He is known for his releases on the British record label Never Say Die Records, including his Revolt, New Reign, and Metropolis extended plays and his various collaborations with other Never Say Die artists.

== Early life ==
Hagberg first began DJing after watching American electronic music producer Skrillex play at the Hard Summer music festival in 2011. Before starting his career in electronic music, Kyle was a drummer, but after becoming more engrossed in his hobby, he started to neglect drumming and instead chose to pursue electronic music. Although music production was just a hobby, he made the decision to study at Icon Collective, a Music school based in Los Angeles. A month after graduating, he began working full-time as a sound designer at sample and preset company Cymatics.fm.

== Career ==
=== 2016: "Sice" and "After All" ===
On June 3, 2016, Hagberg collaborated with Detroit-based dubstep producer G-Rex to release "Sice" on record label Brednbutter as a free digital download. Charles Dylan of EDM Sauce wrote that the song is a "bass infused trap banger that shows both of the producers good sides and gets me excited to hear new music by both camps because this track is so dope."

On December 19, American DJ duos Slander and YOOKiE released a remix extended play of their song "After All" on Never Say Die. The extended play consisted of remixes from various artists including a remix by Hagberg and American dubstep producer Wooli, of which, Run the Trap's Max Chung wrote that the remix maintained what people loved about the original, complimenting the "stellar sound design or crystal clear mixing."

=== 2017: Kill Humans, "GENOCiDE", and "Overheat" ===
On March 2, 2017, two months after the release of the original remix, Hagberg and Wooli released a VIP mix of their "After All" remix on Never Say Die. Writing for Your EDM, Travis McGovern wrote that both producers showcase their "ingenuity as rising bass talents", noting the song as a combination of "dub breaks, future bass stylings and even more energy" compared to the original remix.

On March 31, Hagberg released his sophomore extended play Kill Humans on Firepower Records, a record label founded and owned by Canadian DJ and musician Datsik. "Creepin", a song from the extended play, was released ten days earlier than the rest of the extended play as an exclusive premiere on EDM Sauce.

On May 23, Hagberg collaborated with Los Angeles–based music producer B-Sides to release their remix of "Reims", originally by American record producer RL Grime and released on the latter's record label, WeDidIt. Run the Trap's Max Chung wrote that both producers sound design "absolutely go off on this remix, delivering the heaviest flip of "Reims" we've seen (so far)."

On September 8, Hagberg collaborated with New York–based duo YOOKiE to self-release their song "GENOCiDE" as a free download. Writing for Noiseporn, Cheyenne Noelle described it as a song that "evokes a trip into the dark matter cherished by their thriving fan base", noting its "bone-chilling piano keys, heavy drums, and a Silent Hill-esque siren" for creating an air of austerity.

On December 11, Hagberg's riddim song "Overheat" was released as part of Never Say Die's fifth compilation album, titled Never Say Die Vol. 5, alongside various other songs from artists such as Trampa, Trolley Snatcha, and Spag Heddy.

=== 2018: New Reign, "Extraterrestrial", and subsequent releases ===
On February 23, 2018, Hagberg's song "Pit" was released as part of Black Friday Vol. 16, a compilation album released by Never Say Die's Black Label imprint. Writing for EDM Identity, Jayce Ullah-Blocks generally liked the song, describing it as a perfect song for a mosh pit and that it would have "elbows throwing instantaneously."

On June 18, Hagberg appeared on American musician and DJ Illenium's 15-track Awake (Remixes) remix album with his remix of "Free Fall". While reviewing the album, Akshay Bhanawat of T.H.E. - Music Essentials briefly noted Hagberg's remix as a dubstep-inspired neck breaker. Writing for Nest HQ, Sadye Auren stated that the remix changed the original immensely, writing that it "completely rearranged, armed, and broken down into an impressive dubstep riot."

On July 20, Hagberg released his fifth extended play New Reign on Never Say Die. The track contains four tracks, "Rapture", "Override", "Buck", and "Stomp", the last of which was simply known as the "Stompy ID" throughout Hagberg's live sets. EDM Identity's Jayce Ullah-Blocks reacted mostly positively to the extended play, writing that "Kompany's latest collection is a ravenous behemoth, lacerating heavy dubstep norms, and erecting a new breed of bass in its wake."

On August 27, American dubstep producer Tynan collaborated with Hagberg to release the single "Extraterrestrial". It was released as the first and only single of the former's extended play Pandora's Box, released on November 9 through Never Say Die. Miljan Milkekic of EDM.com praised the song's "metallic and goonie" sound design and "cutting-edge" production, writing that the showcased both artists "skill and successfully combining trap and dubstep, their delivered a track that will bug your mind in months to come." Nest HQ's Molly Hankins also praised the sound design, writing that it sounds so "metallic and simultaneously gooey that the reverberation has an edge to it throughout; it's so refined and tactile, I feel like I can almost taste it."

On September 14, Hagberg was featured on Canadian DJ Snails' The Shell (Remixes) album with his and Ivory's remix of the song "To the Grave".

On October 5, Hagberg collaborated with Wooli once again to release "Thicc Boi" as part of the latter's Mammoth extended play released the same day on Never Say Die. Noiseporn's Jeanette Kats described the song as one that showcased the two musicians' styles in one harmonious, heavy and energetic release", finalising her review by stating that it is clear that both producers "took no shortcuts when it came to making this one of the most fierce collaborations of the year."

On October 17, Hagberg released his remix of Black Tiger Sex Machine's song "Replicants" as part of the latter's remix album New Worlds Remixes alongside nine other songs, each remixed by various artists such as Doctor P and G-Rex.

On December 14, Hagberg made his second appearance on Never Say Die's annual compilation album, releasing his song "Justice" as part of the Never Say Die, Vol. 6 compilation album.

=== 2019: Metropolis, "Purge (With Badklaat)", "Movement", and "Broken" ===
On February 1, 2019, Hagberg released his sixth extended play titled Metropolis on Never Say Die. The track's four tracks, "Firewall", "Seething", "Take it All" (featuring Karra), and "Last Man Standing" (a collaboration with Virus Syndicate) were all anticipated releases following their debut as unknown IDs in various mixes and live performances. Writing for Noiseporn, Tyler Chance praised the extended play, writing that it featured "ample amounts of filthy bass and unique sound design", with every track being unique in their own ways and each possessing Hagberg's "heavy signature sound and is sure to be well received by fans and new listeners alike."

On March 22, Hagberg released his collaboration with English riddim producer BadKlaat titled "Purge" as part of Never Say Die's Black Label. Prior to release, the song circulated as an unknown ID throughout various dubstep and bass music DJ sets.

On April 29, British grime collective Virus Syndicate released their Sick Gang extended play on Disciple's Round Table imprint. The extended play featured Hagberg as a producer and collaborator for the song "Head Top", as well as featuring electronic music producers Virtual Riot, Dion Timmer, Bandlez, and Ivory for the other featured songs. Bianca Silva of Bassrush called the song a "straight-up scorcher that features a pulverising bass drop that comes for blood and drops bombs throughout sure to leave your head spinning."

On May 17, Hagberg released his song "Movement" on Never Say Die. Writing for EDM.com, Sarah Kocur noted the song's basslines to be similar to his other song "Rapture", writing that the song embodied Hagberg's self-created signature sound. Alexandra Harris of Noiseporn stated that the song is a "brilliant, multi-dimensional number" that fully shows Hagberg's extent of his craft.

On June 7, Electronic music producer Space Laces released the remixes to his previous extended play Overdrive. Hagberg was featured on the extended play with his remix of the title track, "Overdrive", alongside other electronic music producers such as Svdden Death, Gammer, Rickyxsan, and Phiso. Dancing Astronaut's Chris Stack described the remix as a track that "thrashes from front to back like a Decepticon mosh pit", noting the "stacking cascading metallic synths that send a shiver down the spine. "

On July 19, Canadian producer and DJ Excision released his remix album Apex: The Remixes. Hagberg was featured on the album with his remix of the song "Power". Dancing Astronaut's David Klemow wrote that Hagberg swapped out the song's distinctive "two-step jab for a pair of steep builds and two aggressive, elbow-throwing breaks."

On August 16, American DJ duo Slander collaborated with Hagberg to release the song "Broken" on Never Say Die. ThisSongSlaps' Brian Bonavoglia described the song as a "seamless blend of punishing bass with a melodic touch without taking away from the intensity of the track", stating that he and fans of Slander and Hagberg would have expected nothing less.

=== 2020: "Bussback", "System Failure", "Chunky", and "Feel It All" ===
On January 18, 2020, Kyle released his collaboration, "Bussback," with American dubstep and riddim producer, Wooli. This was Hagberg's first official release of 2020, and James Dutta on EDM Identity described it as "A downright heavy song that showcases both producers' distinctive dubstep sounds."

On February 29, 2020, Soltan, a Middle Eastern dubstep producer, released his collaboration, "System Failure," with Kyle on Never Say Die Records. Brian Bonavoglia, an author on This Song Slaps, said that System Failure was "The type of bone-rattling behemoth that headbangers fiend for when it comes to a dubstep collaboration of this caliber."

On April 3, 2020, Kompany released "Chunky" on Never Say Die Records, a dubstep collaboration with music producer Effin. Nathen Lane, an editor at Trillvo, stated that "both artist's style[s] within those sounds really bring this track together".

On May 1, 2020, Hagberg released "Consequences", a dubstep song on Never Say Die Records.

== Artistry ==
Hagberg has described his music production process as being almost entirely sound design-driven, with most of his studio recording sessions starting off with such. His Productions and recordings are often inspired by what he is listening to at the time, usually listening to other artists live mixes or just messing around with a Virtual Studio Technology (VST) plug-in or technique if experiencing writer's block.

Riddim producer Subtronics listed Hagberg alongside artists such as Svdden Death and Virtual Riot as some of the producers that he felt were "killing it" in the bass music scene. Your EDM's Matthew Meadow listed Hagberg as one of the "Top 40 artists to watch in 2019", specifically listing him alongside Cray, Svdden Death, Wenzday, and Chime as an artist who had noticeably "poured their blood, sweat, and tears into their projects and are now beginning to be recognised on the global stage."

== Discography ==
=== Albums and extended plays ===
Title	Details
Jackknife EP	Released: December 19, 2015; Label: Kairos Audio; Format: Digital download
Kill Humans	Released: March 31, 2017; Label: Firepower Records; Format: Digital download
Take Aim	Released: November 3, 2017; Label: Firepower Records; Format: Digital download
Revolt EP	Released: January 12, 2018; Label: Never Say Die; Format: Digital download
New Reign EP	Released: July 20, 2018; Label: Never Say Die; Format: Digital download
Metropolis EP	Released: February 1, 2019; Label: Never Say Die; Format: Digital download
Untouchable EP	Released: September 10, 2021; Label: Never Say Die; Format: Digital download

=== Singles ===
==== As lead artist ====
Title	Year	Album	Label
Shake the Room	2016	Non-album single	Otodayo Records
Recognize	2016	Non-album single	Captivation Records
Backlash (with Hopsteady, Crichy Crich and King Tutt)	2016	Non-album single	Cash Gold Records
Sice (with G-Rex)	2016	Non-album single	Brednbutter
In2	2016	Non-album single	Self-released
Byte	2016	Black Vol. 1	Black.
Paranoia (with Tascione)	2016	Smoke & Mirrors	Quality Goods Records
Badlands (with Nitti Gritti)	2016	Dim Mak Presents New Noise, Vol. 9	Dim Mak Records
Stressin' (with Jupe)	2016	Non-album single	Sola
Hold Up (with BLVK Sheep)	2016	Non-album single	Self-released
Light That (with Holly)	2016	Non-album single	Self-released
Sheathe	2017	Non-album single	Self-released
Leeroy (with Top $helf)	2017	Non-album single	Self-released
Charge (with Willy P)	2017	Non-album single	DSV Audio
Dungeon (with Terravita)	2017	Non-album single	Self-released
GENOCiDE (with YOOKiE)	2017	Non-album single	Self-released
Downfall (with G-Rex)	2017	Non-album single	Self-released
Light It (with Klaxx)	2017	Non-album single	Self-released
Dungeon VIP (with Terravita)	2017	Aim To Kill EP	Disciple
Briddim Bomb (with Wooli)	2018	Non-album single	Circus Records
Extraterrestrial (with Tynan)	2018	Pandora's Box EP	Never Say Die
Purge (with BadKlaat)	2019	Non-album single	Never Say Die
Movement	2019	Non-album single	Never Say Die
Broken (with Slander featuring Fknsyd)	2019	Non-album single	Never Say Die
Bussback (with Wooli)	2020	Non-album single	Never Say Die
System Failure (with Soltan)	2020	Non-album single	Never Say Die
Chunky (with Effin)	2020	Non-album single	Never Say Die
Consequences (featuring Runn)	2020	Non-album single	Never Say Die
Blind Sound	2020	Non-album single	Never Say Die
Feel It All	2020	Non-album single	Never Say Die
Tied Up	2020	Non-album single	Never Say Die
Shanque & Smile	2020	Subsidia Night Vol. 1	Subsidia
Make It Hot	2020	Subsidia Night Vol. 1	Subsidia
"Beast" (with Teddy Killerz)	2021	Non-album single	Monstercat
"Untouchable"	2021	Non-album single	Never Say Die Records
"Just Like You" (with KC)	2021	Non-album single	Never Say Die Records
"Stand by Me" (with Whales and Elle Vee)	2021	Non-album single	Monstercat
"Gunshots" (with Hi I'm Ghost)	2022	Non-album single	Never Say Die Records
"Set Me Free" (with Adventure Club and Sara Benyo)	2025	Non-album single	Monstercat

==== As featured artist ====
Title	Details
Stoopid Rich: The Remixes by Crankdat and Havok Roth	Released: May 27, 2016; Label: Brednbutter; Format: Digital download
Black Vol. 1 by Various Artists	Released: July 12, 2016; Label: Black.; Format: Digital download
Smoke & Mirrors by Tascione	Released: July 22, 2016; Label: Quality Goods Records; Format: Digital download
Killers On the Loose Remixes by B-Sides	Released: September 28, 2016; Label: Mowser Music; Format: Digital download
After All (feat. Jinzo) [Remixes] by Slander & YOOKiE	Released: December 19, 2016; Label: Never Say Die; Format: Digital download
Black. Vol. 3 by Various Artists	Released: February 27, 2017; Label: Black.; Format: Digital download
The Cave by Wooli	Released: March 10, 2017; Label: Firepower Records; Formats: Digital download
This Is Your Brain on Dubstep by Bear Grillz	Released: April 7, 2017; Label: Self-released; Format: Digital download
Roots EP by Adair	Released: April 27, 2017; Label: Never Say Die; Format: Digital download
DPMO, Vol. 1 by FuntCase	Released: September 1, 2017; Label: Circus Records; Format: Digital download
Half Man, Half Bear by Bear Grillz	Released: November 22, 2017; Label: Self-released; Format: Digital download
Never Say Die Vol. 5 by Various Artists	Released: December 11, 2017; Label: Never Say Die; Format: Digital download
Black Friday Vol. 16 by Various Artists	Released: February 23, 2018; Label: Never Say Die; Format: Digital download
Next Level EP by Ivory	Released: April 30, 2018; Label: Never Say Die; Format: Digital download
Black Friday Vol. 19 by Various Artists	Released: May 25, 2018; Label: Never Say Die; Format: Digital download
Awake (Remixes) by Illenium	Released: June 18, 2018; Label: Seeking Blue / Kasaya; Format: Digital download
The Shell (Remixes) by Snails	Released: September 14, 2018; Label: Slugz Music; Format: Digital download
Mammoth EP by Wooli	Released: October 5, 2018; Label: Never Say Die; Format: Digital download
New Worlds Remixes by Black Tiger Sex Machine	Released: October 17, 2018; Label: Kannibalen Records; Format: Digital download
Pandora's Box EP by Tynan	Released: November 9, 2018; Label: Never Say Die; Format: Digital download
Aim To Kill EP by Terravita	Released: November 16, 2018; Label: Disciple; Format: Digital download
Never Say Die, Vol. 6 by Various Artists	Released: December 14, 2018; Label: Never Say Die; Format: Digital download
Sick Gang by Virus Syndicate	Released: April 29, 2019; Label: Disciple Round Table; Format: Digital download
Overdrive Remixes by Space Laces	Released: June 7, 2019; Label: Never Say Die; Format: Digital download

=== Remixes ===
Title	Year	Artist	Label
Bake Sale (with Tempest)	2016	Wiz Khalifa (featuring Travis Scott)	Self-released
Touch	2016	Nghtmre	Mad Decent
Stoopid Rich	2016	Crankdat and Havok Roth (featuring Titus)	Brednbutter
Killers On The Loose	2016	B-Sides (featuring Nevve)	Mowser Music
Shame	2016	Prismo	Self-released
After All (with Wooli)	2016	Slander and YOOKiE (Featuring Jinzo)	Never Say Die
After All (with Wooli, VIP)	2017	Slander and Yookie (Featuring Jinzo)	Never Say Die
Jefe (with Sharps)	2017	Boombox Cartel	Self-released
Reims (with B-Sides)	2017	RL Grime	WeDidIt
Hold On To Me	2017	Yellow Claw (featuring GTA)	Self-released
Only Want U	2017	Snails & Nghtmre	Slugz Music
Free Fall	2018	Illenium (featuring Runn)	Seeking Blue / Kasaya
To the Grave (with Ivory)	2018	Snails (featuring Hytyd and Max)	Slugz Music
Replicants	2018	Black Tiger Sex Machine and Apashe	Kannibalen Records
Overdrive	2019	Space Laces	Never Say Die
Squeeky Clean	2020	Moody Good	Never Say Die
Lockdown	2020	Excision and Wooli	Excision Music
Save You	2020	Riot Ten and Whales (featuring Megan Stokes)	Dim Mak
One More Day	2021	Jason Ross, Blanke and Chandler Leighton	Ophelia
