= Love Is Gone (disambiguation) =

"Love Is Gone" is a 2007 song by David Guetta and Chris Willis

Love Is Gone may also refer to:

- "Love Is Gone", a song by Slander and Dylan Matthew, from the 2022 album Thrive
- "Love Is Gone", a song by G-Eazy from the 2017 album The Beautiful & Damned
- Love Is Gone (album) by Dommin, 2010
