= The Mystifying Oracle =

Studio album by Ghastly
- Released: May 4, 2018
- Genre: Dubstep; bass

Singles from The Mystifying Oracle
- 1. "LSD" Released: March 30, 2018; 2. "Fake U Out" Released: April 13, 2018; 3. "Black Mamba" Released: April 20, 2018; 4. "Lemme See U" Released: April 27, 2018

The Mystifying Oracle is the debut studio album by American DJ Ghastly. Consisting of 13 songs and collaborations with artists such as Barely Alive, Crankdat, Dr. Fresch, it was released on May 4, 2018.

In March 2018, Ghastly announced the release date of his album on social media.

== Reception ==
The album was described as "a masterpiece." Billboard described it as channeling "a spectrum of rattling emotions that range from anger and losing a loved one to being inspired and sharing personal life lessons." Your EDM described the album as "a theatrical, bass heavy album that delivers nonstop energy, drool-worthy sound design, and endless, boundless imagination."

== Singles ==
"LSD" was released as the lead single from the album in March. The second single "Fake U Out" is a collaboration with Barely Alive, following with the third single "Black Mamba". The fourth single is "Lemme See U", a collaboration with Crankdat.

== Track listing ==
| No. | Title | Length |
|---|---|---|
| 1. | "Mystifying Oracle" | 4:03 |
| 2. | "Fake U Out" (with Barely Alive) | 2:44 |
| 3. | "Black Mamba" | 3:13 |
| 4. | "Don't Give Up" | 3:22 |
| 5. | "Everybody" (featuring Sam King) | 3:37 |
| 6. | "Lemme See U" (with Crankdat) | 3:45 |
| 7. | "LSD" | 4:20 |
| 8. | "Geisha (The Tokyo VIP)" | 3:34 |
| 9. | "Shadow City" | 3:40 |
| 10. | "Rise Up" (with Dr. Fresch) | 3:58 |
| 11. | "This Is How" | 3:03 |
| 12. | "I'll Wait" (featuring Shaylen) (vocal mix) | 3:40 |
| 13. | "Yes / No Goodbye" | 2:08 |
| Total length: | | 45:07 |
