= Riot Ten =

American DJ and record producer (born 1992)

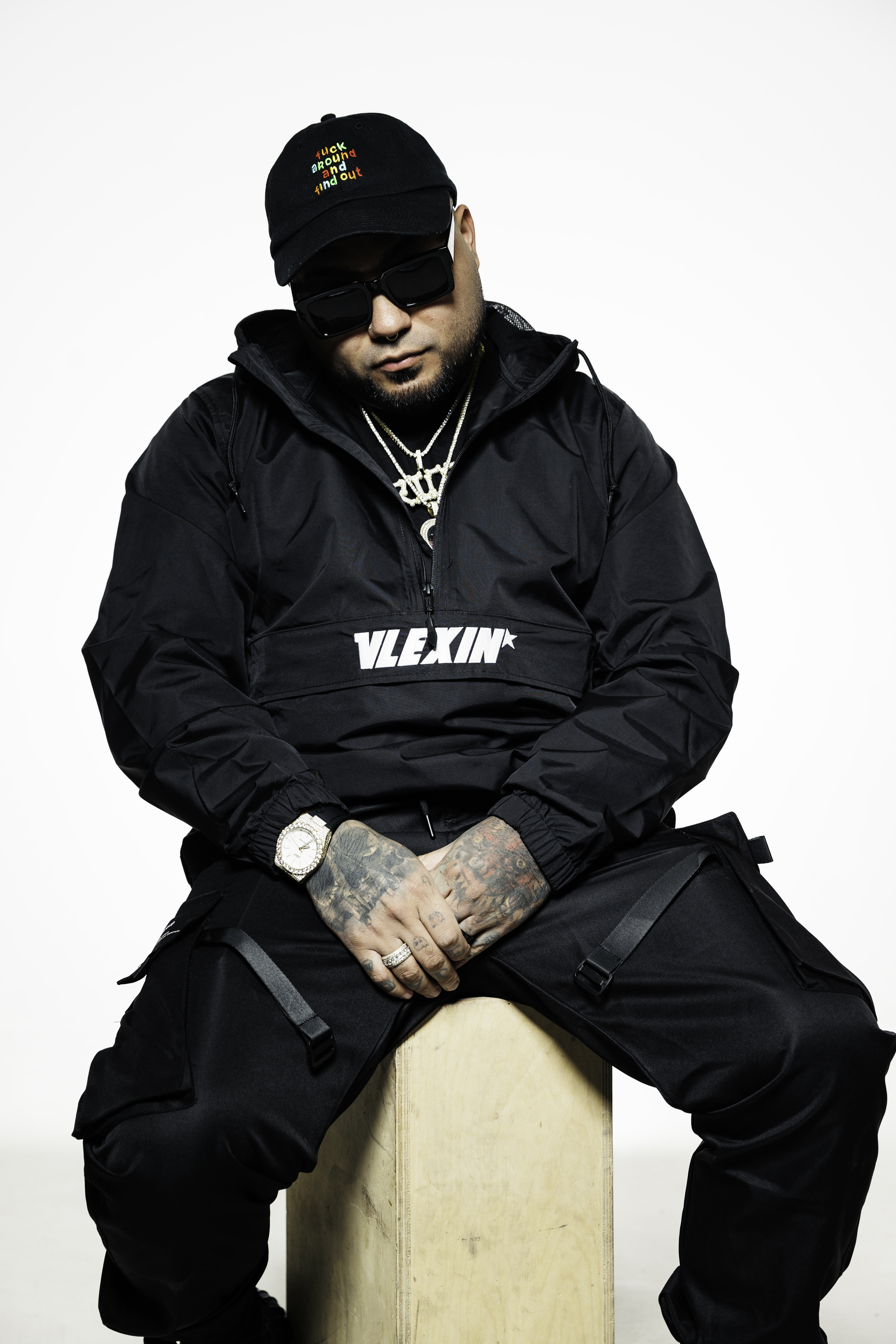

Background information
- Born: Christopher Wilson; October 27, 1992 (age 33); El Paso, Texas, U.S.
- Origin: El Paso, Texas, U.S.
- Genres: Dubstep; trap; hardstyle; hip hop; electro house
- Occupations: DJ; producer; musician; remixer
- Years active: 2012–present
- Labels: Dim Mak; Disciple; Firepower; Kannibalen; Never Say Die; Thrive; Rottun; Monstercat
- Website: hypeordietour.com

Christopher Wilson (born October 27, 1992), better known by his stage name Riot Ten, is an American DJ and record producer based in El Paso, Texas. He is best known for his dubstep and hardtrap production and is currently signed to Steve Aoki's Dim Mak, with additional music out on Excision's Rotten Recordings, Never Say Die Records, Disciple Records, and Firepower, as well as remixes on Atlantic Records, Interscope Records, and RCA Records. Since 2016, Wilson has toured alongside Yellow Claw, Adventure Club, Steve Aoki, Kayzo, Pegboard Nerds, and Excision.

== Career ==
In 2016, Riot Ten released his debut EP Hype Or Die: Headbangerz on Datsik's Firepower Records. The EP included his breakout single "Like Kanye" featuring Trinidadian dancehall artist Bunji Garlin. He went on to sign with Steve Aoki's Dim Mak Records, where he released his now famed dubstep anthem "Rail Breaker".

== Discography ==
=== Albums ===
- Hype or Die: Nightmares (2019)
- Hype or Die: Emergence (2020)
- Blkmrkt Vol. 1 (2020)
- Hype Or Die: Homecoming (2021)
- AD INFINITUM (2022)
- Requiem for a Riot (2025)

=== Extended plays ===
==== 2018 ====
- Hype or Die: The Dead EP
- Hype or Die: Genesis EP

==== 2019 ====
- Hype or Die: Sun City EP
- Hype or Die: Nightmares (album)

=== Singles ===
==== 2016 ====
- "Like Kanye" (featuring Bunji Garlin)
- "Hit The Floor" (with Sullivan King)
- "F**k It" (with Sullivan King)

==== 2017 ====
- "Rail Breaker" (featuring Rico Act)
- "Headbusta" (featuring Milano The Don)
- "Scream" (with Sirenz)

==== 2018 ====
- "No Surrender" (featuring Jeff Kush)
- "Act A Fool" (with Throwdown featuring Bok Nero)

==== 2019 ====
- "Glocks" (with Saymyname featuring Milano The Don)
- "Come Back" (with Gentlemen's Club)

==== 2020 ====
- "Lost Your Mind"
- "Ultimate" (with Shaquille O'Neal featuring T-Wayne)
- "Save You" (with Whales featuring Megan Stokes)
- "Wanna Go" (with Charly Jordan)
- "Bang Bang" (with Cesqeaux)
- "Tiktok" (with Blvk Jvck featuring $teve Cannon)
- "Run It" (with Bear Grillz featuring Bok Nero)

==== 2021 ====
- "Poppin" (with Chrmdrs featuring Krystall Poppin)
- "Get Out" (with Starx featuring Blupill and Dopeboylo)
- "Don't You"
- "Ready For War" (with Dogma featuring Joe Buras)
- "Control" (featuring Add1ction)
- "Ngmf" (with Gammer)
- "Mawlee" (featuring Young Buck and DJ Afterthought)

==== 2022 ====
- "Bussin Bussin" (with SubDocta featuring JV Rhymes)

2024

- "Feral"
- Tear It Down (featuring Bok Nero)

=== Remixes ===
==== 2018 ====
- Herobust — "WTF" (Riot Ten Remix)
- Sullivan King — "Begone" (Riot Ten Remix)

==== 2020 ====
- DJ Snake and Eptic - "Southside" (Riot Ten Remix)
- Modestep - "The Fallout" (Riot Ten Remix)

==== 2022 ====
- Steve Aoki featuring Miss Palmer - "No Beef" (Riot Ten and Crankdat Remix)

2024

- Öwnboss & Selva - Riot (Riot Ten Remix)
