= Over the Edge (Kayzo and Gammer song) =

2017 future house single

Single by Kayzo and Gammer featuring AU8UST

from the album Monstercat Uncaged Vol. 2
- Released: August 11, 2017
- Recorded: 2017
- Genre: Future house
- Length: 4:03
- Label: Monstercat
- Songwriter(s): August Hausman
- Producer(s): Hayden Capuozzo; Matthew Lee

Kayzo singles chronology
"Whistle Wars" (2017)	"Over the Edge" (2017)	"Forever" (2018)

Gammer singles chronology
"Party Don't Stop" (2017)	"Over the Edge" (2017)	"Let's Get Crunk" (2017)

"Over the Edge" is a song by American electronic producer Hayden Capuozzo and English UK hardcore producer Matthew Lee, featuring American singer-songwriter August Hausman. Canadian record label Monstercat released it on August 11, 2017. The song was featured on the compilation album Monstercat Uncaged Vol. 2, released August 25, 2017.

== Background and release ==
In early 2017, Capuozzo had received an a cappella song sent by Hausman, though Capuozzo had not started on any production using the a cappella as he decided to instead finish up other projects. During Flux Pavilion's Around The World in 80 Raves tour, Capuozzo started production on "Over the Edge" using Hausman's original a cappella. He later contacted Lee to propose a collaboration between the two as the song would be divergent compared to both producers past work. In an interview with Billboard, Capuozzo commented on the production process of the song, saying "It had a vibe that would be great for us to try something a bit outside the box", further stating "we always make crazy fast paced stuff, so I figured we could try something really new for the both of us."

"Over the Edge" was featured on Monstercat's thirty-second compilation album titled Monstercat Uncaged Vol. 2 released on August 25, 2017. It was the second track on the album, which also includes 29 songs by various artists and two album mixes.

== Critical reception ==
"Over the Edge" received generally mixed to positive reviews. Lauren Ikenn of This Song Slaps wrote that the song was "bound to be a hit", further stating that the song "is the ultimate house track, complete with a hard-hitting beat, a catchy drop and AU8UST's pop-infused vocals." Billboard's David Rishty wrote that the two producers had "flipped the script and dropped a bouncy house cut", describing the song as "buoyant" and "sprinkled with high-pitched vocal chops." Marcus of EDM Sauce described the songs drop as anime-like, further writing that "these dudes have us completely fooled. It's a pretty damn cool song for that reason. If you know these guys, you know that this drop is the last thing you would expect from them especially after hearing the hard build." Writing for Trapstyle, Ali Mooney noted that the song is "very different from their previous track", later describing the song as having a "mellow house feel, to it mixed with melodic, electronic sounds." Noiseporn's Lennon Cihak wrote "Kayzo and Gammer have most definitely stepped away from their typical fast-paced hardcore music and have focused their efforts in a production that truly complements AU8UST's pop vocals" Writing for EDMTunes, Aly Galito noted the two producers sway from their typical style, writing "the song includes a different feel away from trap and dubstep as it incorporates a mixture of a pop and house", later stating "it's refreshing to hear new and catchy sounds like this."

== Track listing ==
"Over the Edge" (feat. AU8UST)

No.	Title	Length
1.	"Over the Edge"	4:03
Total length:		4:03

== Credits and personnel ==
Personnel

- Lead vocals, songwriting – August Hausman
- Production – Hayden Capuozzo and Matthew Lee

== Release history ==
Region	Date	Format	Version	Label	Ref.
Worldwide	August 11, 2017	Digital download	"Over the Edge" (feat. AU8UST)	Monstercat	
Worldwide	August 25, 2017	Digital download	Monstercat Uncaged Vol. 2	Monstercat	
