= Party Don't Stop (Darren Styles, Dougal and Gammer song) =

Single by Darren Styles, Dougal and Gammer

from the album Monstercat Uncaged Vol. 2
- Released: 26 July 2017
- Recorded: 2016–17
- Genre: UK hardcore
- Length: 3:18
- Label: Monstercat
- Producers: Darren James Mew; Paul Arnold Clarke; Matthew Lee

Darren Styles singles chronology
"Us Against The World" (2017)	"Party Don't Stop" (2017)	"Long Way Down" (2018)

Gammer singles chronology
"Red Drink Foam Party" (2017)	"Party Don't Stop" (2017)	"Over the Edge" (2017)

Dougal singles chronology
"Shoulder Lock" (2016)	"Party Don't Stop" (2017)	"Burning Up" (2018)

"Party Don't Stop" is a song by English UK hardcore producers Darren Mew, Paul Clarke and Matthew Lee. Canadian record label Monstercat released it on 26 July 2017. The song was featured on the compilation album Monstercat Uncaged Vol. 2, released 25 August 2017.

== Background and release ==
"Party Don't Stop" had originally been played since late 2016 in many shows by various hard dance disc jockeys as "the go-to live track" by such artists as Kayzo and Da Tweekaz. The song features uncredited vocals by Heather Bright, also known as her stage name Bright Lights. The vocals were originally released in 2015 as part of her self-titled sample pack and have since been used by such artists like Bounce Inc. and Blasterjaxx, though the sample was popularised by the future house song "We Don’t Need No Sleep" by Croatia Squad.

"Party Don't Stop" was featured on Monstercat's thirty-second compilation album titled Monstercat Uncaged Vol. 2 released on 25 August 2017. It was the thirteenth track on the album, which also includes 29 songs by various artists and two album mixes.

== Critical reception ==
"Party Don't Stop" was well received by most critics. Jordan Mafi of Nest HQ wrote that the song has become a "setlist staple" for hard dance DJs, stating "this track is so high energy, with a signature UK hardcore kick and a startling drop, it’s fit to be played again and again." Trillvo's Ana Alvarado noted the three artists noticeable contributions to the song, writing about Lee's "new unique sound" alongside the combination of Mew's build up and Clarke's progressions, stating that the trio had "executed such an exciting beat." Writing for EDM Nations, Iuliana Prichea wrote that the song "does not take its proverbial foot off the gas pedal from beginning to end" and that any party that would play the song "won’t be ending quietly". Joe Weshefsky of EDMTunes described the song as one that "immediately hits you with that hard", writing "if you’re looking to keep the party going, this track is a safe bet to ensure that the party don’t stop." Noiseporn's Lennon Cihak described the songs lead melody as "metallic-sounding", further describing the qualities of the song as "being thin yet energetic".

== Track listing ==
"Party Don't Stop"

No.	Title	Length
1.	"Party Don't Stop"	3:17
Total length:		3:17

== Credits and personnel ==
Personnel

- Lead vocals – Heather Bright
- Production – Darren Mew, Paul Clarke and Matthew Lee

== Release history ==
Region	Date	Format	Version	Label	Ref.
Worldwide	26 July 2017	Digital download	"Party Don't Stop"	Monstercat	
Worldwide	25 August 2017	Digital download	Monstercat Uncaged Vol. 2	Monstercat	
