= Movement (Kompany song) =

Single by Kompany
- Released: 17 May 2019
- Genre: Riddim; dubstep
- Length: 3:45
- Label: Never Say Die
- Songwriter: Kyle Hagberg
- Producer: Kyle Hagberg

Kompany singles chronology
"Purge" (2019)	"Movement" (2019)	"Broken" (2019)

"Movement" is a song by Los Angeles–based dubstep producer Kompany. English record label Never Say Die released it on May 17, 2019.

== Background and release ==
On May 17, 2019, the song was released as a digital download on international digital stores through English record label Never Say Die Records, as well as being released through various music streaming services.

== Critical reception ==
"Movement" was well received by most critics. Sarah Kocur of EDM.com stated that the song is guaranteed to be "among the new bass anthems for the summer", describing it as" intense" and "in-your-face bass", noting its bassline to be similar to Kompany's previous song "Rapture". Writing for EDM Sauce, Maria Southgate praised Kompany's technical abilities in the song and wrote that the song was a "groundbreaking addition to Kompany's outstanding musical catalogue." Noiseporn's Alexandra Harris called the song a "brilliant, multi-dimensional number" that represented the full extent of Kompany's craft, stating that "so many layers of bass waves and so many different unique sounds combine to create a listen that is interesting and just downright fun." James Dutta of EDM Identity described it as "Kompany at his best" and as "absolute chaos in the best way possible." Writing for ThisSongSlaps, Brian Bonavoglia wrote that Kompany "once again showcases his production prowess serving up another guttural soundscape that will leave listeners in awe."

== Track listing ==
Digital download – Single
No.	Title	Length
1.	"Movement"	3:45
Total length:		3:45

== Release history ==
Region	Date	Format	Version	Label	Ref.
Worldwide	May 17, 2019	Digital download	"Movement"	Never Say Die	
