= Mo Honey Mo Problems =

EP by Bear Grillz
- Released: April 22, 2016
- Genre: Dubstep; big room house; EDM
- Length: 13:13
- Label: Firepower Records
- Producer: Bear Grillz

Mo Honey Mo Problems is an extended play by American DJ and producer Bear Grillz. The song "Going Down" received over 100,000 plays in less than a week.

== Track listing ==
No.	Title	Length
1.	"Fuck Bitches Get Honey"	3:47
2.	"Every Day"	3:04
3.	"Going Down (Under)"	3:28
4.	"Back on Top"	3:34
Total length:		13:13

== Charts ==
Chart	Peak position
US Top Dance/Electronic Albums	25
