= Extraterrestrial (Tynan and Kompany song) =

Single by Tynan and Kompany

from the album Pandora's Box EP
- Released: 27 August 2018
- Genre: Dubstep; trap
- Length: 3:28
- Label: Never Say Die
- Producer(s): Tynan; Kyle Hagberg

Tynan singles chronology
"Blood Moon" (2018)	"Extraterrestrial" (2018)	"Voidless" (2018)

Kompany singles chronology
"Briddim Bomb" (2018)	"Extraterrestrial" (2018)	"Purge" (2019)

"Extraterrestrial" is a song by American electronic music producer Tynan and Los Angeles–based dubstep producer Kompany. English record label Never Say Die Records released it on August 27, 2018. The song was released as part of Tynan's Pandora's Box extended play released on November 9, 2018.

== Background and release ==
On August 27, 2018, the song was released as a digital download on international digital stores through English record label Never Say Die, as well as being released through various music streaming services. It was released as the first and only single on Tynan's third extended play Pandora's Box, released through Never Say Die on November 9, 2018. As of June 3, 2019, the song has gained around 265,000 plays on SoundCloud and over 97,000 views on the UKF Dubstep YouTube channel.

== Critical reception ==
TYNAN & Kompany – "Extraterrestrial"
A 25-second excerpt of the song "Extraterrestrial" showcasing its mix of dubstep and trap music, as well as the song's sound design and production, which various critics praised.

"Extraterrestrial" was well received by most critics, with most complimenting the song's mix of dubstep and trap, sound design, and production. Molly Hankins of Nest HQ praised the song's sound design and production, calling it "refined and tactile" and writing that it is "so metallic and simultaneously gooey that the reverberation has an edge to it throughout", finalising her review by saying that "if you’re going to release a trap slapper, bass-beast, or dubstep mind-melter, when it comes to sound design, this is the sonic calibre to beat." Writing for EDM.com, Miljan Milekic wrote that the song showcased both artist's "skill and successfully combining trap and dubstep, their delivered a track that will bug your mind in months to come." ThisSongSlaps' Brian Bonavoglia noted the song as one that mixes dubstep and trap in "mind-numbing fashion", calling the song a beast that "showcases their production prowess once again solidifying those claims."

== Track listing ==
Digital download – Single
No.	Title	Length
1.	"Extraterrestrial"	3:28
Total length:		3:28

== Release history ==
Region	Date	Format	Version	Label	Ref.
Worldwide	August 27, 2018	Digital download	"Extraterrestrial"	Never Say Die	
