= Sullivan King =

American musician and DJ

Background information
- Born: Keaton Prescott; July 15, 1994 (age 32)
- Origin: Los Angeles, California, U.S.
- Genres: Dubstep, rock, drum & bass, bass music, metalstep
- Occupations: Musician, disc jockey
- Instruments: Electric guitar, Digital Audio Workstation
- Years active: 2014–present
- Labels: Dim Mak; Disciple; Kannibalen; Monstercat; Ultra; Hopeless; Blackened; Reprise; Rise; Disruptor; RCA; Geffen; Interscope; Warner Bros.; Spinnin'
- Website: sullivankingmusic.com

Keaton Prescott, known artistically as Sullivan King (born July 15, 1994), is an American DJ of dubstep music and heavy metal musician. He has drawn attention from the music press for his unusual blending of EDM and electric guitar-centered heavy metal performance, "making his live shows one of the few places where kandi-coated ravers and metalheads mingle". King has made multiple US tours since his concert debut in 2014, most recently announcing a nationwide tour during the latter half of 2021, and has released singles collaborating with musicians including Papa Roach and drummer Matt McGuire of The Chainsmokers.

== Discography ==
=== Studio albums ===
Title	Album details
Show Some Teeth	Released: October 18, 2019; Label: Kannibalen Records; Format: Digital
Loud (Note: Stylized in all caps)	Released: June 25, 2021; Label: Hopeless Records; Format: Digital
Thrones of Blood	Released: March 17, 2023; Label: Monstercat; Format: Digital

=== Extended plays ===
Title	Album details
House of Wolves	Released: September 19, 2017; Label: Kannibalen Records; Formats: Digital
Vantablack (with Dirtyphonics)	Released: November 3, 2017; Label: Monstercat; Formats: Digital
Come One, Come All	Released: April 27, 2018; Label: Kannibalen Records; Formats: Digital
The Demented	Released: January 18, 2019; Label: Kannibalen Records; Formats: Digital
To the Grave	Released: January 27, 2021; Label: Subsidia Records; Formats: Digital
Chaos Will Bring Peace (Note: Stylized in all caps)	Released: January 24, 2025; Label: Monstercat; Formats: Digital
Raise the Dead	Released: November 25, 2025; Label: Subsidia; Formats: Digital

=== Singles ===
- "Pure Evil" (with Jauz) (2014)
- "Kill it with Fire" (with Ghastly) (2014)
- "Terminus" (2014)
- "112 Ounces of Pounding" (2014)
- "Toro!" (with Goshfather & Jinco) (2014)
- "Breathe" (with Twiich featuring Amber Noel) (2015)
- "Psycho" (2015)
- "Finest Hour" (2015)
- "Till We Die" (with Kayzo) (2015)
- "Follow Me" (with Jinco) (2016)
- "Cardboard Castles" (with Nightowls) (2016)
- "F*ck It" (with Riot Ten) (2016)
- "Hit The Floor" (with Riot Ten) (2017)
- "We In Here" (with Nightowls featuring Dan Rudd) (2017)
- "Lockdown" (with Matt McGuire featuring Sam King) (2017)
- "House Of Wolves EP" (2017)
- "Vantablack" (with Dirtyphonics) (Vantablack EP) (2017)
- "Body Bag" (with Riot Ten) (2017)
- "Welcome to the Fire" (with SLANDER) (2017)
- "Pit Boss" (with Riot Ten featuring DJ Paul) (2018)
- "Dropkick" (Come One, Come All EP) (2018)
- "Step Back" (Come One, Come All EP) (2018)
- "I'll Fight Back" (2018)
- "Go Down" (with Yookie) (2018)
- "The Demented EP" (2019)
- "Save the World" (2019)
- "Between the Lines" (with Kai Wachi) (2019)
- "Crazy as You" (with Grabbitz) (2019)
- "Bad Times" (Show Some Teeth) (2019)
- "Reckless" (Show Some Teeth) (2019)
- "Breathless" (Show Some Teeth) (2019)
- "Show Some Teeth" (with Kompany) (Show Some Teeth) (2019)
- "Ricochet" (featuring Cayte Lee) (Show Some Teeth) (2019)
- "Don't Forget Me" (with Wooli) (2020)
- "Flatline" (with Kai Wachi and GG Magree) (2020)
- "Drum Mag" (To The Grave EP) (2020)
- "Lifeless" (To The Grave EP) (2020)
- "Tinnitus" (with Benda) (To The Grave EP) (2020)
- "Someone Else" (Thrones of Blood) (2020)
- "Unbound" (with Excision) (To The Grave EP) (2021)
- "Domination" (with Kayzo and Papa Roach) (2021)
- "Take Flight" (with Subtronics) (2021)
- "Sleep" (with Calcium) (2022)
- "The Dead March" (with Ray Volpe) (Thrones of Blood) (2022)
- "Let Me Go" (with Wooli) (Thrones of Blood) (2022)
- "Thrones of Blood" (Thrones of Blood) (2023)
- "Fall Apart" (with Excision) (Thrones of Blood) (2023)
- "Pursuit of Violence" (with Svdden Death) (Thrones of Blood) (2023)
- "Bass To The Dome" (with Excision) (2023)
- "You Can't Break Me" (with Adventure Club featuring Atreyu) (2023)
- "Codename: Reckless" (with Excision) (2024)
- "Blame" (2024)
- "The Death of Peace of Mind" (2024)
- "The Beginning" (Chaos Will Bring Peace) (2024)
- "Slaughter" (with Vastive) (Chaos Will Bring Peace) (2024)
- "Never Come Back" (with Kompany and DIESEL) (Chaos Will Bring Peace) (2024)
- "Lean Onto Me" (with NGHTMRE featuring Grabbitz) (Chaos Will Bring Peace) (2024)
- "SWEAT!" (with Kayzo) (Chaos Will Bring Peace) (2024)
- "MF Mosh Pit" (with Timmy Trumpet & Und3rsound) (2024)
- "On & On" (2025)
- "Adrenaline" (with Excision featuring From Ashes to New) (Raise The Dead) (2025)
- "HEADLOCK" (2026)
- "Push Up" (with T-Pain and Zoey808) (2026)

==== As featured artist ====
- "Break it Down" (JayKode featuring Sullivan King) (2017)
- "Wicked" (Bear Grillz featuring Sullivan King) (2018)
- "Shake the Ground" (Kill the Noise and Snails featuring Sullivan King and Jonah Kay) (2018)
