= Superhuman (Slander song) =

2017 song by Slander

Single by Slander featuring Eric Leva

from the album Monstercat Uncaged Vol. 2
- Released: June 23, 2017
- Recorded: 2017
- Genre: Future bass
- Length: 4:29
- Label: Monstercat
- Songwriter: Eric Leva
- Producers: Derek Andersen; Scott Land

SLANDER singles chronology
"Drop It" (2017)	"Superhuman" (2017)	"Without You" (2017)

"Superhuman" is a future bass song by Los Angeles–based musical duo Slander featuring vocals from Los Angeles–based singer Eric Leva. It was released on June 23, 2017, by independent electronic music label Monstercat.

== Reception and release ==
David Rishty of Billboard noted the direction Slander took for the song compared to their previous songs, stating "Swapping bone-crushing trap synths for emotive chord progressions. The warm future bass production also comes paired with the smooth vocals of rising pop singer Eric Leva".

Stefano Frantellizzi of EDM Sauce praised the song, stating "This song is an absolute emotional rollercoaster. It's a prime example of how future bass should be made, with the smooth vocals of Eric Leva and the lovely and yet powerful synths of the drops, it comes together nicely to be something that is sure to be remembered for a long time".

Chelsea King of Noiseporn described the song as "full of emotive progressions and synths as Eric Leva’s voice drifts over the future bass track. Superhuman has the potential to be one of 2017’s most popular tracks, with euphoric melodies that can float seamlessly from radios on road trips to the super sound systems at the mainstage".

In July 2017, Andersen and Land announced a world tour. The tour lasted two months, starting in Changsha, China and ending in Thornville, Ohio.

== Remixes ==
On November 8, 2017, English UK hardcore producer Gammer released his remix of Superhuman on Monstercat. Nick White of EDM Sauce praised the remix, describing it as "One of the best remixes of the past few months". Josh Hymo of Dancing Astronaut stated "Psytrance has to meddle its way in at some point, which Lee introduces perfectly with loud, high-pitched synths trance fans all know and love leading into a silent, yet hard-hitting drop bound to make its way into a SLANDER-esque festival set".

On November 14, 2017, Spanish dubstep producer Spag Heddy released his remix of Superhuman on Monstercat. Chad Downs of Dancing Astronaut noted the remix for "Transforming the emotive feel of the original and wrapping it in pounding, heart-stopping drops for a balance between melodic and dark bass".

== Track listing ==
=== Superhuman (feat. Eric Leva) ===
No.	Title	Length
1.	"Superhuman" (featuring Eric Leva)	4:28
Total length:		4:28

=== Superhuman (Gammer Remix) [feat. Eric Leva] ===
No.	Title	Length
1.	"Superhuman" (Gammer Remix, featuring Eric Leva)	4:28
Total length:		4:28

=== Superhuman (Spag Heddy Remix) [feat. Eric Leva] ===
No.	Title	Length
1.	"Superhuman" (Spag Heddy Remix, featuring Eric Leva)	3:42
Total length:		3:42
