= Love Is Gone (Slander song) =

- Acoustic single cover

Single by Slander featuring Dylan Matthew

from the album Thrive
- Released: May 10, 2019
- Genre: EDM; future bass; dance-pop
- Length: 4:16
- Label: Gud Vibrations; Create Music Group
- Songwriters: Derek Andersen; Scott Land; Dylan Matthew
- Producers: Derek Andersen; Scott Land

Slander singles chronology
"All You Need to Know" (2019)	"Love Is Gone" (2019)	"Potions" (2019)

Music video
- "Love Is Gone" (Original) on YouTube "Love Is Gone" (Acoustic) on YouTube "Love Is Gone" (with Joshua of Seventeen) Video on YouTube

"Love Is Gone" is a song by American DJ duo Slander featuring American singer-songwriter Dylan Matthew. It was released on May 10, 2019 through Gud Vibrations. An acoustic version of the track was made available in November of the same year through Gud Vibrations and Create Music Group, which went viral amidst the COVID-19 pandemic.

== Background and release ==
The original version of "Love Is Gone" was released on May 10, 2019, with an acoustic version of the song released on November 13, 2019. It is the duo's fourth collaboration with Dylan Matthew. The music video for the original version of “Love Is Gone” was produced over the span of three years and shows "a majestic atmosphere that ebbs and flows seamlessly" with the song. The track was later added to the duo's debut album Thrive in September 2022.

An alternate version of "Love Is Gone" was released on July 25, 2025, in collaboration with Joshua of the South Korean boy band Seventeen.

== Live performances ==
Slander has performed "Love Is Gone" at numerous music events and festivals, including Lollapalooza 2019, Ultra Taiwan 2020, Lost Lands 2021, EDC Las Vegas 2021, Coachella 2022, and the Escapade Music Festival 2022. They additionally performed it during their Chimera Tour across the United States from August to December 2023.

== Reception ==
The acoustic version of "Love Is Gone" went viral during the COVID-19 pandemic in 2020. The original version peaked at number 45 on the US Hot Dance/Electronic Songs chart during the week of January 18, 2020, while the acoustic version peaked at number 12 and number 22 on the Dance/Electronic Digital Song Sales and Dance/Electronic Streaming Songs charts respectively, over a year after its release in February 2021. It was certified platinum by the Recording Industry Association of America (RIAA) in June 2023.

== Covers ==
South Korean singer Cha Eun-woo performed a piano cover of the song in January 2024, which was met with praise from Slander.

== Charts ==
=== Weekly charts ===
"Love Is Gone" (original version)
Chart (2020)	Peak position
US Hot Dance/Electronic Songs (Billboard)	45

"Love Is Gone" (acoustic version)
Chart (2021)	Peak position
US Dance/Electronic Digital Songs (Billboard)	12
US Dance/Electronic Streaming (Billboard)	22

== Certifications ==
Certifications for "Love Is Gone"
Region	Certification	Certified units/sales
Denmark (IFPI Danmark)	Gold	45,000^{‡}
New Zealand (RMNZ)	Platinum	30,000^{‡}
United States (RIAA)	Platinum	1,000,000^{‡}
^{‡} Sales+streaming figures based on certification alone.
