= Broken (Slander and Kompany song) =

2019 song by Slander

Single by Slander and Kompany featuring Fknsyd
- Released: August 16, 2019
- Genre: Dubstep
- Length: 3:18
- Label: Never Say Die
- Songwriter: Fknsyd
- Producers: Derek Andersen; Scott Land; Kyle Hagberg

Slander singles chronology
"Potions" (2019)	"Broken" (2019)

Kompany singles chronology
"Movement" (2019)	"Broken" (2019)

"Broken" is a song by American DJ duo Slander and Los Angeles–based dubstep producer Kompany. English record label Never Say Die Records released it on August 16, 2019.

== Background and release ==
On August 16, 2019, the song was released as a digital download on international digital stores through English record label Never Say Die, as well as being released through various music streaming services.

== Critical reception ==
"Broken" was well received by most critics. Harry Levin of Dancing Astronaut called the song "nothing but heavy all the way through", writing that the vocals sounded like they were floating on top of a "soundtrack to a war between two robotic alien races." Writing for DJ Times, Brian Bonavoglia stated that Slander showcased their production skill with Kompany to create a "riveting anthem" that touches on the former's "trademark melodic touch". Noiseporn's Jeanette Kats praised the song, specifically its sound design, drums, and vocals and described the second drop as having a "beautifully crafted chord progressions". Austria Masim of EDMTunes stated that the song was a "passionate force of synergetic ferocity and anguish", with all artists involved with the song encompassing the "embodiment of bloodthirsty fierceness as the track".

== Track listing ==
Digital download – Single
No.	Title	Length
1.	"Broken"	3:18
Total length:		3:18

== Release history ==
Region	Date	Format	Version	Label	Ref.
Worldwide	August 16, 2019	Digital download	"Broken"	Never Say Die	
