= Metropolis (EP) =

EP by Kompany
- Released: February 1, 2019
- Genre: Riddim; dubstep; trap; midtempo bass
- Length: 15:48
- Label: Never Say Die
- Producer: Kyle Hagberg

Kompany chronology
New Reign (2018)	Metropolis (2019)

Metropolis is the sixth extended play by Los Angeles–based dubstep producer Kompany. It was released by English record label Never Say Die Records on February 1, 2019. It contains four songs, including features of singer–songwriter Karra and British grime collective Virus Syndicate.

== Background and release ==
As a lead up to the extended plays release, the four songs present in it were premiered on various electronic music-focused websites, with "Firewall" being premiered by Nest HQ, "Seething" by ThisSongSlaps, "Take It All" by Run the Trap, and "Last Man Standing" by EDM Sauce. Prior to release, the four tracks were only known as IDs seen in various DJ mixes and live-sets.

On February 1, 2019, the extended play was released as a digital download on international digital stores through English record label Never Say Die, as well as being released through various music streaming services.

== Critical reception ==
Metropolis was well received by most critics. Tyler Chance of Noiseporn praised the extended plays sound design and production, describing it as "filthy" and "unique" and writing that each track is "unique in its own right" as the extended play traverses such genres as riddim, trap and midtempo bass. Writing for FUXWITHIT, Samuel Lewis and Steph Contant stated that the extended play presented Kompany and opportunity to craft "massive soundscapes with astounding depth and detail, crafting a complex labyrinth of bass to captivate and absorb the listener." Relentless Beat's Joshua Dean described the extended play as a story, noting "Firewall" as a "great buildup into an absolutely insane EP" and the last song, "Last Man Standing", as a "faultless ending to this masterpiece."

== Track listing ==
Digital download
No.	Title	Producer(s)	Length
1.	"Firewall"	Kompany	4:16
2.	"Seething"	Kompany	3:17
3.	"Take It All" (featuring Karra)	Kompany	4:29
4.	"Last Man Standing" (with Virus Syndicate)	Kompany; Virus Syndicate	3:46
Total length:			15:48

== Release history ==
Region	Date	Format	Label	Ref.
Worldwide	February 1, 2019	Digital download	Never Say Die	
