= Kneel Before Me =

2018 dubstep single

Single by Slander & Crankdat featuring Asking Alexandria

from the album Monstercat Uncaged, Vol. 5
- Released: August 9, 2018
- Genre: Dubstep; rock
- Length: 3:21
- Label: Monstercat; Sumerian
- Songwriter(s): Derek Andersen; Ben Bruce; Christian Smith; Danny Worsnop
- Producer(s): Derek Andersen; Scott Land; Christian Smith

Slander singles chronology
"So Long" (2018)	"Kneel Before Me" (2018)	"You Don't Even Know Me" (2018)

Crankdat singles chronology
"Say It" (2018)	"Kneel Before Me" (2018)	"Wobble" (2018)

Asking Alexandria singles chronology
"Alone in a Room" (2018)	"Kneel Before Me" (2018)	"Vultures" (2018)

"Kneel Before Me" is a song by American DJs Slander and Crankdat, featuring the English rock band Asking Alexandria. It was released on August 9, 2018 by Monstercat and Sumerian Records and was included a week later on the compilation album Monstercat Uncaged, Vol. 5.

== History ==
In the process of working with Asking Alexandria, Andersen and Land cited the band—among others, such as Avenged Sevenfold, Underoath and Taking Back Sunday—as one of their inspirations. Monstercat CEO Mike Darlington praised the collaboration between his label and Ash Avildsen's Sumerian Records, calling the cross-boundary release "truly inspiring."

== Reception ==
Stanley Sutton, writing for Dance Music Northwest, stated: "With punishing vocals, and a drop that shows no mercy, this track is about to become every rails’ worst nightmare." Omar Serrano of Run the Trap called the song "the manic dubstep collaboration that opens the portal to hell", and added: "The barbarous sound design accompanies the rough drum kit to offer fans with one of the harshest tunes of the year". Matthew Meadow of YourEDM praised the single, stating: "The drops are absolute insanity, the vocals evoke pure rage and anger, and it’s all tied together with an incredible melody that makes us thank god this collaboration exists in the first place". Dancing Astronaut stated that the song "showcases the producers’ diverse production capabilities as they meld the different genres together into an exciting whole".

== Personnel ==
- Derek Andersen – producer
- Scott Land – producer
- Christian Smith – producer
- Danny Worsnop – vocalist
- Ben Bruce – guitar
- Cameron Liddell – guitar
- Sam Bettley – bass
- James Cassells – drums
