= Dirtyphonics =

French electronic music band

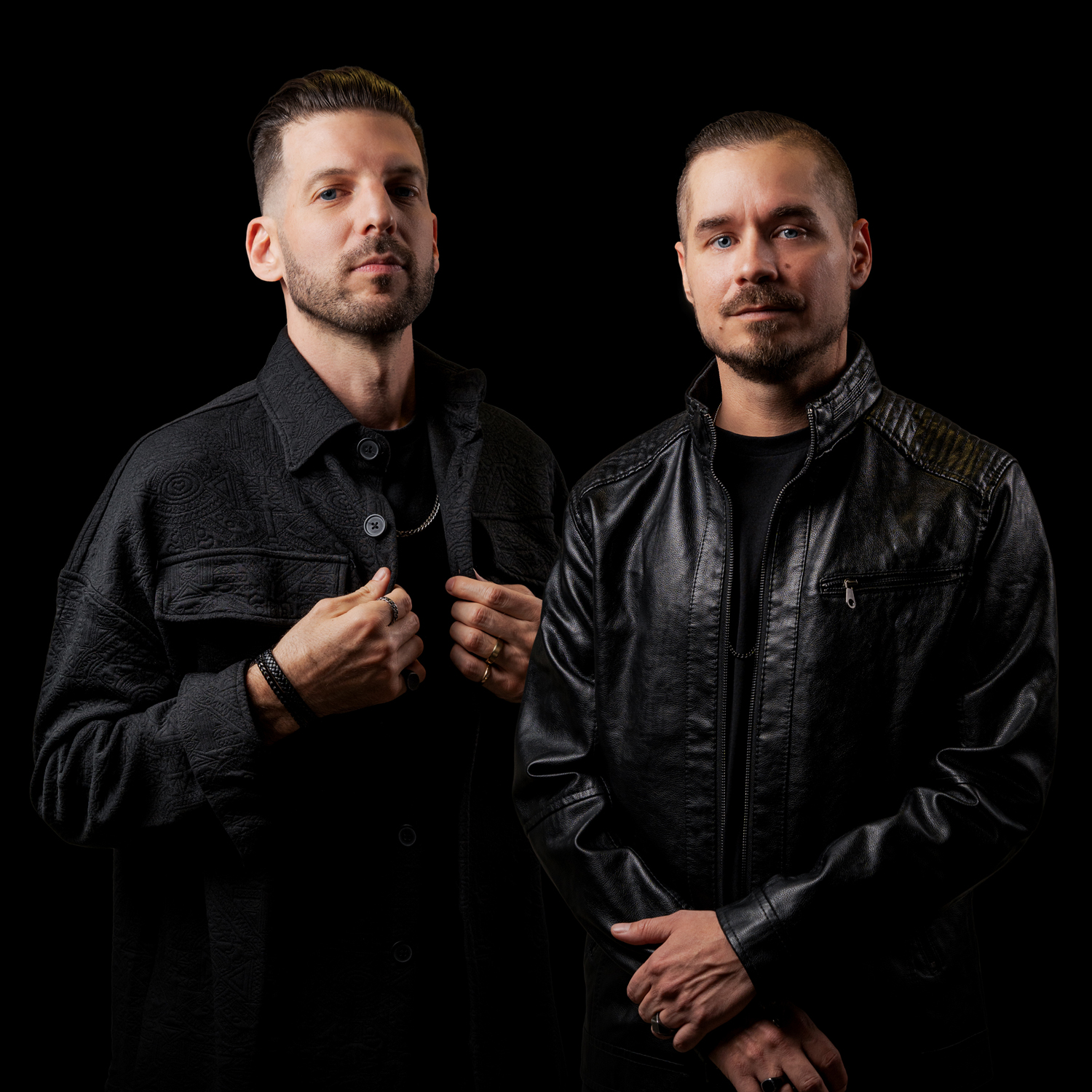
- Dirtyphonics in 2024

Background information
- Genres: Drum and bass; Dubstep; Drumstep; Bass house
- Years active: 2004–present
- Labels: Monstercat; UKF; Disciple; Dim Mak
- Members: Charles-Eric Florian Jacques Barranger; Julien Robert Rene Corrales
- Past members: James "Youthstar" Davies; Thomas Desbouvrie; Pho
- Website: dirtyphonics.com

Dirtyphonics is a French electronic music band from Paris, consisting of members Charles-Eric Florian Jacques "Charly" Barranger and Julien Robert Rene "PitchIn" Corrales. Known for blending Drum and bass, Dubstep, and other bass music genres with heavy metal and cinematic influences, the group has been active since 2004.

Signed to labels such as Monstercat, UKF Music, Disciple Records, and Dim Mak Records, Dirtyphonics first gained recognition with their 2008 single "French F**k," which reached number one on Beatport's charts. Their debut album, Irreverence, was released in 2013. Over the years, they have collaborated with major artists including Linkin Park, Skrillex, Kaskade, and Sullivan King, and have remixed tracks for Marilyn Manson, Steve Aoki, and Benny Benassi.

In the 2020s, Dirtyphonics solidified their status in the global bass music scene with releases such as the What The French EP in 2022, and their second album, Magnetic, released on Monstercat in 2024. They have continued to tour internationally and are set to celebrate their 20th anniversary with a headline show at the Bataclan in Paris on April 5, 2025.

== History ==
=== Formation and early career ===
Dirtyphonics was founded in 2004 and began performing live shows in 2006. For the first two years, the group consisted of Charly, Thomas Desbouvrie, and Pho. In 2008 PitchIn joined the fold. Their influences include Daft Punk and Pendulum, as well as metal bands such as Metallica and Korn. "Most of us started by playing in metal bands," recalls Charly. "Our sound was always meant to be powerful, high-impact, and precise. From the day we’ve started, we’ve challenged ourselves to create something new - we love to push boundaries." The boys did just that in translating the energy and excitement from their head-banging days to the emergent world of electronic dance music.

In 2008, the group signed to Shimon's label, AudioPorn Records. They released their first single that year, the aptly named "French F**k" which quickly rose to the number one spot on Beatport's charts and stayed there for several weeks. Follow-up singles "Quarks" and "Vandals" proved the act's ascension was no fluke, showcasing the group's signature style-shifting low-end heavy sound. The group quickly became a hot commodity in the remix world, lending their talents to tracks by the likes of Skrillex, The Bloody Beetroots, Marilyn Manson, Benny Benassi, Excision, Datsik, Borgore, Nero, and Linkin Park. In 2013, Thomas quit the band to become an artist as "Matheo de Bruvisso".

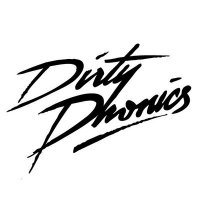
Early version of the Dirtyphonics logo

=== 2013: Irreverence ===
In 2009, they earned "Best Newcomer Producer" honor at the Drum & Bass Arena Awards. The next three years were a busy time for Dirtyphonics. They headlined sold-out shows worldwide with everyone from Skrillex and Knife Party to Steve Aoki and DJ Snake. They also made notable appearances at festivals like EDC, Glastonbury Festival, SXSW, Pukkelpop, WMC, Tomorrowland and countless others.

On 19 March they released their first full-length album Irreverence on Dim Mak Records. The album is a heavy mix of anthemic electro, frenetic drum-step, thrash guitars, and pounding drums. It features notable collaborations with Steve Aoki, Foreign Beggars, and Modestep.

=== 2015: Write Your Future ===
In early 2014, Thomas Desbouvrie resigned from the band to pursue his aspirations in Art. Although one member short, the band lost no speed and continued touring at major festivals worldwide. Finding a second wind in the studio, Dirtyphonics released a collaboration with Zeds Dead, Where Are You Now feat. Bright Lights on Mad Decent. In February 2015, the band released their sophomore Write Your Future EP on Dim Mak Records including collaborations with UZ, 12th Planet, Trinidad James, Matt Rose and Julie Hardy. The band toured the US and Europe while continuing to write much music. Back from tour, the band released Anonymous in homage of their Drum and Bass roots and as a strong statement of their sound. Quickly after, the Write Your Future – Remixes EP came out on Dim Mak Records with remixes from Habstrakt, FuntCase, High Maintenance and Infuze. On 21 October 2015, the band released "Hoverboard", a song they wrote in 2005.

=== 2017: Vantablack ===
In 2017 Dirtyphonics joined Monstercat to release their “Vantablack EP” in collaboration with Sullivan King. This EP re-assesses their metal roots and cements the heaviness and diversity of their sound. Songs like “Hammer”, “Sight Of Your Soul” and “Vantablack’” gathered over 15M streams on Spotify and landed on major playlists.

=== 2019 to 2023: LIIVE ===
In 2019 they created and designed a new show to celebrate 10 years on the road. With “Dirtyphonics LIIVE”, Charly and Pitchin headlined festivals in Europe as an homage to their roots. They worked on exclusive music and visuals to create a unique experience. As a part of the Disciple records family, they released “Scars EP”, “Rise From The Dead”, "Gasoline" as well as many collaborations and remixes.

In 2020, Dirtyphonics reinforced their role as ambassadors of French bass music by collaborating with both established and emerging French producers. They released the "What the French EP," a project aimed at unifying the French bass music scene and asserting its unique identity. The EP features collaborations with SampliFire on "Molitor," IVORY on "Bastille," Ecraze on "Pantheon," and Graphyt on "Haxo," each track referencing symbolic locations in Paris significant to Dirtyphonics. The Asymetrics noted, "The idea behind 'What The French' is simple: unify the French Bass music scene and assert its identity."

=== 2023 to present: Magnetic ===
In 2023, Dirtyphonics released the single "Burbank Nights" on September 6 through Monstercat's Uncaged imprint. The track was featured in the Rocket League x Monstercat collaboration and later included in their second studio album, Magnetic.

Their sophomore album, Magnetic, was released on May 3, 2024, via Monstercat. The 12-track album showcases a blend of drum and bass, dubstep, and metal influences, featuring collaborations with artists such as Circadian, IVORY, SampliFire, and Bossfight.

To commemorate their 20th anniversary, Dirtyphonics performed a special concert at Le Bataclan in Paris on April 5, 2025. The event marked the culmination of their Magnetic world tour and featured guest appearances by artists including Circadian, ASDEK b2b IVORY, and Deja Vu.

== Discography ==
=== Studio albums ===
Title	Album details
Irreverence	Released: 19 April 2013; Label: Dim Mak Records
Magnetic	Released: 3 May 2024; Label: Monstercat

=== Extended plays ===
Title	Album details
Vandals	Released: 25 May 2009; Label: AudioPorn Records
Teleportation	Released: 14 December 2009; Label: AudioPorn Records
Write Your Future	Released: 13 February 2015; Label: Dim Mak Records
Night Ride	Released: 10 February 2017; Label: Buygore
Vantablack (with Sullivan King)	Released: 3 November 2017; Label: Monstercat
Scars	Released: 22 May 2019; Label: Disciple Records
What the French	Released: 18 February 2022; Label: Disciple Records

=== Singles ===
Year	Title	Label
2008	French F**k	AudioPorn Records
2008	Bonus Level	AudioPorn Records
2009	The Secret (featuring Tali)	AudioPorn Records
2009	Quarks	AudioPorn Records
2009	Lottery	AudioPorn Records
2009	Glow	AudioPorn Records
2010	Lost In The Game	AudioPorn Records
2011	Tarantino	Dim Mak Records
2011	Oakwood	Dim Mak Records
2011	French F**k VIP	Self-released
2012	I Need Your Love	Self-released
2012	DIRTY	Dim Mak Records
2013	Walk In The Fire	Dim Mak Records
2013	No Stopping Us (featuring Foreign Beggars)	Dim Mak Records
2013	Hanging On Me	Dim Mak Records
2013	Los Angeles	Dim Mak Records
2014	Where Are You Now (with Zeds Dead) (featuring Bright Lights)	Mad Decent
2015	Anonymous	Self-released
2015	Hoverboard	Self-released
2015	Anonymous VIP	Self-released
2016	Neckbreaker with FuntCase	Circus Records
2016	Holy Sh*t	Dim Mak Records
2017	Watch Out (with Bassnectar) (featuring Ragga Twins)	Monstercat
2017	Got Your Love (with Riot)	Monstercat
2018	Sayonara	Monstercat
2018	Scorpion	Rampage Recordings
2019	Rise From The Dead	Disciple Records
2019	In Your Skull (with Samplifire)	Disciple Records
2019	Evil Inside (with Bossfight)	Monstercat
2020	Dark Elixir	Disciple Records
2020	Evil Inside VIP (with Bossfight)	Monstercat
2021	Gasoline	Disciple Records
2021	Blindfold	Disciple Records
2022	Le Club (with ECRAZE, Graphyt, IVORY & Samplifire)	Disciple Records
2022	Run	UKF
2023	Revenge (with Bossfight)	Monstercat
2023	Burbank Nights	Monstercat
2023	Coming Home (with Micah Martin)	Monstercat
2024	Right Here, Right Now	Monstercat
2024	You Want Me (with Circadian)	Monstercat
2024	You Want Me (VIP) (with Circadian)	Monstercat

Remixes

- PhaseOne - "Break Em" (Dirtyphonics Remix) - 2020
- Zeds Dead - "Blame" (Dirtyphonics Remix) - 2017
- The Chainsmokers - "Closer" (Dirtyphonics Remix) - 2016
- Skrillex and Alvin Risk - "Try It Out" (Dirtyphonics Remix) - 2016
- Steve Aoki - "Neon Future" (Dirtyphonics Remix) - 2015
- Le Castle Vania - "Disintegrate" (Dirtyphonics Remix) - 2014
- Kaskade and Project 46 - "Last Chance" (Dirtyphonics Remix) - 2013
- Steve Aoki and Rune RK featuring RAS - "Bring You To Life" (Dirtyphonics Remix) - 2013
- Linkin Park - Lies Greed Misery (Dirtyphonics Remix) - 2013
- Borgore - Legend (Dirtyphonics Remix) - 2013
- 12th Planet & Flinch - "The End Is Near Part 1" (Dirtyphonics Remix) - 2012
- Foreign Beggars - "Apex" (Dirtyphonics Remix) - 2012
- Marilyn Manson - "Slo-Mo-Tion" (Dirtyphonics Remix) - 2012
- Excision & Datsik - "Deviance" (Dirtyphonics Remix) - 2012
- Krewella - "Killin it" (Dirtyphonics Remix) - 2012
- Krafty Kuts featuring Dynamite MC - "Pounding" (Dirtyphonics Remix) - 2011
- Dan Sena featuring Del the Funky Homosapien & Kylee Swenson - "Song Of Siren" (Dirtyphonics Remix) - 2011
- The Crystal Method featuring The Heavy - "Play For Real" (Dirtyphonics Remix) - 2011
- Skrillex - "Scary Monsters and Nice Sprites" (Dirtyphonics Remix) - 2011
- Does It Offend You, Yeah? - "Wondering" (Dirtyphonics Remix) - 2011
- Benny Benassi featuring T-Pain - "Electroman" (Dirtyphonics Remix) - 2011
- Nero - "Me & You" (Dirtyphonics Remix) - 2011
- Shimon - "The Shadow Knows" (Dirtyphonics Remix) - 2010
- The Bloody Beetroots - "Warp" (Dirtyphonics Remix) - 2010
- ShockOne - "Polygon" (Dirtyphonics Remix) - 2010
- Aki & Cody-C - "Reggaetronik" (Dirtyphonics Remix) - 2006

== Awards ==
- Best Newcomer Producers (DNB Arena Awards 2009)
- Best Band Or Duo (DJ Mag FR)
