= Ghastly (DJ) =

American electronic music producer and DJ

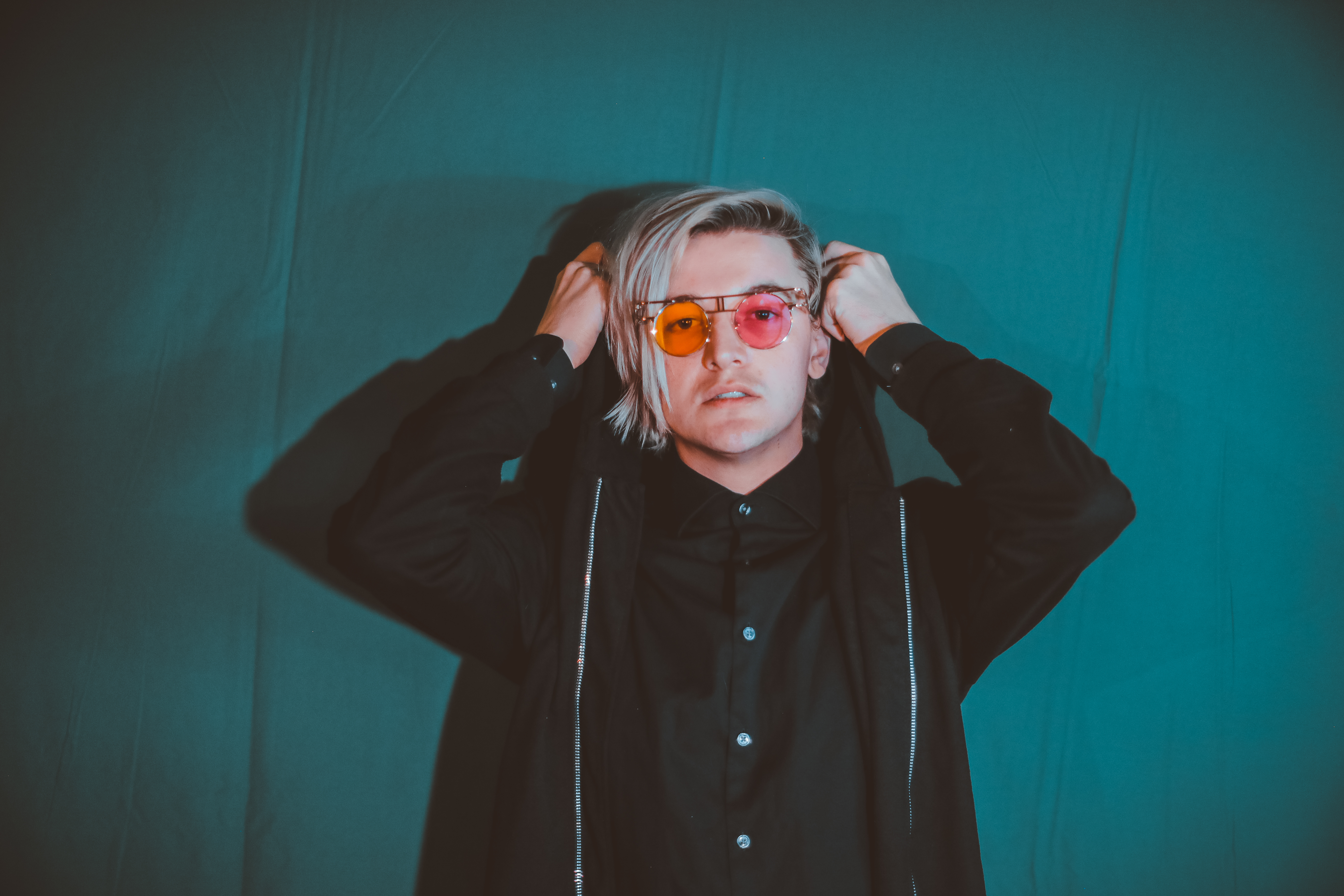

Background information
- Also known as: Ghengar
- Born: David Lee Crow; October 23, 1989 (age 36); Arizona, United States
- Origin: Los Angeles, United States
- Genres: EDM; bass house; dubstep
- Occupations: DJ; musician; record producer
- Instrument: Digital audio workstation
- Years active: 2014–present
- Labels: Armada Music; Buygore; Dim Mak; Mad Decent; Kannibalen; Owsla; The EDM Network
- Website: ghastly.komi.io

David Lee Crow, better known by his stage names Ghastly & GHENGAR, is an American DJ and record producer based in Los Angeles, California and originally from Avondale, Arizona. He has released songs on Owsla, Buygore, and Dim Mak, such as "Miami Connection" with Jauz and "Crank It" with Mija and Lil Jon.

== Early life ==
David Lee Crow was raised on a goat farm with 260 goats and 650 cows in Buckeye, Arizona.

He relocated to Venice Beach, California before finding work as resident DJ at Exchange LA. His parents were unable to finance him, leaving him homeless to live in a van before deciding on moving into the city.

He would shower at public restrooms and wake up on the beach. He worked for two months at American Apparel who later fired him for being homeless. After moving into an apartment on skid row, he discovered the moniker “Ghastly” and began moving forward with the brand concept. Shortly after being hired and fired from dozens of jobs, he became broke and moved back to the farm in Arizona to save up his finances before again returning to Los Angeles to give a career in electronic music another chance. He found work as a promoter at Exchange LA who later hired him as a resident DJ.

Prior to learning and using his first DAWs which were Reason and Ableton, he was one of the two vocalists in the deathcore band The Irish Front.

== Career ==
In 2012, "Flunky Flex", the first song Crow ever wrote was released on an Owsla compilation album.

He then produced an EP for the label but was turned down because it wasn't as 'funky' as his first song.

After losing his job and all of his finances he then moved back to the farm to begin again. After seven months of saving up his money, he moved back into his van in Los Angeles and started from scratch. At a rave, he met Mija and talked about collaborating before writing the song "Crank It". Mija sent it to Skrillex, the founder of OWSLA. He then invited the pair to join him at the festival Burning Man where they became friends and sealed the deal for Ghastly to release music under his label.

From there, he began writing music continuously since there was spotlight on him and he took advantage of it. After releasing a slew of originals and remixes he began climbing up the festival bills as well as the charts. He released his debut studio album on May 4, 2018, titled The Mystifying Oracle.

== Discography ==
=== Studio albums ===
Title	Details
The Mystifying Oracle	Released: May 4, 2018; Label: Self-released; Format: Digital download, CD

Title	Details
Haunted Haus	Released: April 15, 2022; Label: Self-released; Format: Digital download, CD

=== Extended plays ===
Title	Details
The OG	Released: June 16, 2021; Label: Kannibalen Records; Format: Digital download

=== Singles ===
Title	Year	Record label
"Funky Flex" (with Arielle Williams)	2012	Owsla
"Kill It with Fire" (with Sullivan King)	2014	Buygore
"Crank It" (with Mija and Lil Jon)	2014	OWSLA
"Every Night"	2015	Dim Mak
"Get On This"	2015	Mad Decent
"Dogs in the House" (with Goldplate)	2015	The EDM Network
"Hawt" (with Brillz)	2015	Mad Decent
"666!" (with Getter)	2016	OWSLA
"Fuk Watchu Think" (featuring Jameston Thieves)	2016	OWSLA
"The Spiders Symphony"	2017	Self-released
"End of the Night" (with NGHTMRE)	2017	Mad Decent
"We Might Fall" (with Matthew Koma)	2017	Self-released
"Geisha"	2017	Self-released
"I'll Wait"	2017	Self-released
"LSD"	2018	Self-released
"Fake U Out" (with Barely Alive)	2018	Self-released
"Black Mamba"	2018	Self-released
"Lemme See U" (with Crankdat)	2018	Self-released
"This Song Scares People"	2018	Self-released
"Control"	2018	Self-released
"Heretic" (with G-Rex)	2019	Self-released
"Psycho" (with Moonboy)	2019	Self-released
"Fangs" (with Alrt)	2019	Self-released
"I Have Ur Back"	2019	Self-released
"Get Down" (with Brohug)	2019	Self-released
"I Want U" (with Nite Out)	2019	Self-released
"Help" (featuring Karra)	2020	Proximity
"Stay" (featuring Micah Martin)	2020	Self-released
"The OG"	2021	Kannibalen Records
"Blackout"	2021	Kannibalen Records
"Burner"	2021	Self-released
"Vibe" (featuring Misdom)	2021	Self-released

=== Remixes ===
- Diplo – "Biggie Bounce" (Ghastly and Mija Mix) (2014)
- The Crystal Method - "Sling The Decks" (Ghastly Remix) (2015)
- GRiZ featuring iDa Hawk - "Stop Trippin'" (Ghastly Remix) (2015)
- Nghtmre and Slander – "Warning" (Ghastly Remix) (2015)
- Snails (DJ) and Herobust - "Pump This" (Ghastly Remix) (2015)
- Zomboy – "Lights Out" (Ghastly Remix) (2017)
- IZII - "Birds" (Ghastly & SWAGE Remix) (2018)
- Latroit and Bishøp - "Loving Every Minute" (Ghastly Remix) (2018)
- Bo Burnham - "All Eyes On Me" (Ghastly Remix) (2021)
