= Vantablack (EP) =

2017 extended play by Dirtyphonics & Sullivan King

EP by Dirtyphonics & Sullivan King
- Released: 3 November 2017
- Recorded: 2017
- Studio: 17 Hertz Studio, Los Angeles, California
- Genre: Dubstep; drumstep; heavy metal
- Length: 18:57
- Label: Monstercat
- Producer: Charly Barranger; PitchedIn; Pho; Keaton Prescott

Dirtyphonics chronology
Night Ride (2017)	Vantablack (2017)

Singles from Vantablack
- 1. "Vantablack" Released: 9 October 2017; 2. "Sight of Your Soul" Released: 3 November 2017

Vantablack is a collaborative extended play by French electronic band Dirtyphonics and Los Angeles–based electronic rock producer Sullivan King. Vantablack was released on 3 November 2017, by the independent electronic music label, Monstercat. The EP features six songs, all of which were produced by both producers.

== Background and composition ==
On 9 October, Dirtyphonics and King released the single "Vantablack" on Monstercat. Landon Fleury of Your EDM praised the song "Vantablack", stating "Sullivan King's genuinely raw, intense vocals definitely give 'Vantablack' an entire new dimension of depth. Simply said, metalheads aren't gonna be disappointed with this one", describing the song as "the hardest release on Monstercat EVER".

On 18 October, when questioned in an interview with Mix 247 EDM about who were his top five collaborations, King stated "I'll just say that recently I've really loved working with Dirtyphonics". In a later question, King revealed that the single "Vantablack" was part of an extended play. Dirtyphonics later officially revealed in a tweet that "Vantablack" would be part of an extended play and would be released in early November.

In an interview with Elizabeth Ninivaggi of Dancing Astronaut, Dirtyphonics commented on the production process of the extended play, stating "We thought and wrote this EP like a metal piece and freed ourselves from what you can or can't do". King further commented on the production process, stating:

We went into the project treating it as an album. We wrote more songs than what made it on the record. We treated ourselves like a band. We decided to do something different from what we would probably do for just a solo project record. We had to mentally prepare ourselves to get it to sound like this. Lots of experimenting, a lot of doing what we weren't used to, and letting everyone have their say. The writing process of a record isn't just as much about all the little details of how you want each track to be, but about how it ALL sounds together from start to finish. The listener being able to experience the emotion behind a project that took 11 months to work on.

== Reception and release ==
On 3 November, the extended play was released alongside a second single titled "Sight of Your Soul". Alternative Press described the single as "the best of rock and electronic in an addictive package that you'll be blasting all day". Iuliana Prichea of EDM Nations gave the extended play a positive review, stating "Balancing their hardcore Metal roots and their renowned places in the dubstep and bass music communities, Vantablack is the perfect EP for any metalheads and bassheads alike". Landon Fleury of Your EDM praised the extended play, saying it was "a diverse collection of songs that showcases Dirtyphonics & Sullivan King's talents across the board, containing everything from dubstep neck-breakers to more soft and heartfelt pieces".

== Track listing ==
No.	Title	Length
1.	"Vantablack"	4:26
2.	"Navigator"	3:12
3.	"Roam"	1:09
4.	"Sight of Your Soul"	3:17
5.	"Timbale"	3:36
6.	"Hammer"	3:17
Total length:		18:57
