= Fake Fake Fake =

Single by Kayzo featuring XO Sad
- Released: 28 September 2018
- Genre: Dubstep; emo
- Length: 3:37
- Label: Ultra
- Songwriter(s): XO Sad
- Producer(s): Hayden Capuozzo

Kayzo singles chronology
"Forever" (2018)	"Fake Fake Fake" (2018)	"Wasted Space" (2018)

"Fake Fake Fake" (stylised in all caps) is a song by Los Angeles-based producer Kayzo and Italian emo punk rock band XO Sad. American record label Ultra released it on September 28, 2018.

== Background and release ==
The song was released as a continuation from Kayzo's debut album Overload, primarily serving as Kayzo's exploration and growth into a style of music that merges electronic music and rock/pop punk.

Kayzo first stumbled upon XO Sad on SoundCloud a while before the production of "Fake Fake Fake", discovering their cover of "I Fall Apart" by Post Malone and liking their combination of rap/R&B with the production style of electronic music. Kayzo met Becko, the lead singer of XO Sad, backstage at the Italian music festival Nameless Festival, later contacting him to create two records together, one of which being "Fake Fake Fake". During the song production, XO Sad sent Kayzo an a cappella recording, which the latter produced the song entirely around. The two worked with each other by sending each other work via Dropbox as XO Sad was based in Italy and Kayzo was based in the United States.

On September 28, 2018, the song was released as a digital download on international digital stores through American record label Ultra, as well as being exclusively released for streaming platforms Spotify and Apple Music.

== Critical reception ==
"Fake Fake Fake" was well received by most critics. Bella Bagshaw of Dancing Astronaut wrote that the song was a fusion of "morose punk/screamo-infused vocals, grinding guitar chords, and pelting bass melodies", describing it as a "fiery douse of dubstep-tinged with more than a hint of sadness." Earmilk's Alshaan Kassam stated that although the song may not have catered to Kayzo's usual fanbase, "you can feel his inner craziness personified by this experimental track", writing that the song seems to blend "both heavy rock and bass music to create a banger that can only be listened to with the volume turned up to eleven." Bianca Silva of Bassrush wrote that the song could be interpreted as being heavily inspired by the music Kayzo grew up listening to, calling XO Sad's vocals "angsty" and finalising her review by describing the song as having "some serious emo feels." Your EDM's Matthew Meadow noted the song's vocals, percussion and "sorrowful, droning piano melody" as reminiscent to music from the early 2000s.

== Track listing ==
Digital download – Single
No.	Title	Length
1.	"Fake Fake Fake"	3:37
Total length:		3:37

== Release history ==
Region	Date	Format	Version	Label	Ref.
Worldwide	September 28, 2018	Digital download	"Fake Fake Fake" (feat. XO Sad)	Ultra	
