= JT Roach =

American singer-songwriter (born 1987)

- Birth name: John Thomas Roach
- Born: October 23, 1987 (age 37)
- Origin: Madison, Wisconsin, United States
- Genres: Folk; indie; pop; EDM
- Occupations: Singer; songwriter; producer
- Instruments: Guitar; piano; vocals
- Website: www.jtroachmusic.com

JT Roach is an American singer and songwriter. He was the winner of the Season 1 finale of NBC's show Songland, in which OneRepublic chose his song, "Somebody to Love," to perform and record.

== Career ==
After working as an assistant video editor for The Onion, Roach moved to Los Angeles to be a songwriter. After several years of writing hundreds of songs, he signed a publishing deal with BMG for which he wrote songs for performers such as Jessie Reyez, Emily Warren, French Montana, Lil Jon, Krewella, Nicky Romero, and Jonas Blue.

In 2017, Roach began his solo project with the release of a number of singles including "Lazy Kisses." He also released his debut EP Witches Lake independently just before moving to the EDM scene as a vocalist. He continues to release music under his own imprint, including tracks like "Symmetry" and "Murderer."

His first break in dance music was through the song "Potions" by SLANDER and Said the Sky, which peaked at No. 25 on the Billboard Dance Chart. Since then, he has collaborated with artists including Adventure Club, Bear Grillz, and Jason Ross.

== Discography ==
Singles

- "Tipsy Love" (2017)
- "Bloom" (2017)
- "Wasted Roses" (2017)
- "Don't Keep Me Waiting" (2018)
- "Chapel" (2018)
- "Symmetry" (2018)
- "Lazy Kisses" (2018)
- "Shivers" (2018)
- "Make It Up To You" (2019)
- "Unforgettable" (2020)
- "Black Hair Ties" (2020)
- "Murderer" (2020)
- "Wish You Were Here" (2021)
- "Your Best Is Different Every Day" (2021)
- "Limelight" (2022)
- "Photograph" (2022)

Extended plays

- Witches Lake (2019)

Collaborations

- "Failsafe" (2018) – Hidden Citizens
- "Potions" (2019) – Slander and Said The Sky
- "Potions (Acoustic)" (2020) – Slander and Said The Sky
- "Hide & Seek" (Don Diablo Edit) (2020) – Don Diablo and Danny Olson
- "Better Than Heaven" (2020) – Slander and Jason Ross
- "Where We Are" (2020) – Bear Grillz and Adventure Club
- "Out Loud" (2021) – Fairlane and Rozes
- "Crazy While We're Young" (2021) – Crystal Skies
- "Creature" (2021) – Black Tiger Sex Machine
- "Drugs" (2021) – Effin
- "Gravity" (2021) – Slander and Subtronics
- "Shadow" (2021) – Bossfight and Runn
- "Spinnin' Wheels" (2022) – Nurko
- "Surrender" (2022) – Bear Grillz and Luma
- "Watch Over Me" (2022) – Slander
- "Beyond the Veil" (2022) – Seven Lions
- "Antidote" (2023) – Audien and Codeko
