= Mija (DJ) =

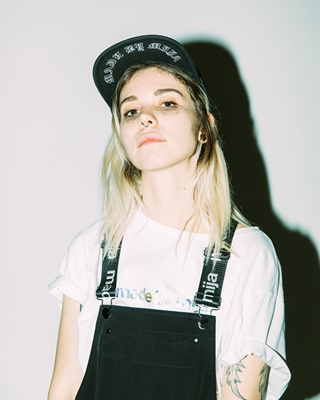
- Mija in 2016

Background information
- Born: Amber Giles; May 30, 1992 (age 34); Phoenix, Arizona, U.S.
- Genre: EDM
- Occupations: DJ; music producer; promoter
- Instruments: turntables; synthesiser; sampler; sequencer; personal computer
- Years active: 2012–present
- Label: Owsla Never B Alone Fool's Gold
- Website: mija.bot

Amber Giles (born May 30, 1992), known professionally as Mija, is an American DJ, music producer, and promoter, originally from Phoenix, Arizona.

== Personal life ==
Giles was born in Phoenix, Arizona, where she was in a choir that toured France and Canada.

== Career ==
As a promoter, she booked Skrillex before he came to mainstream attention. She lived with several DJs when she was 18, and after briefly studying fashion she dropped out and started DJing full-time in Phoenix in 2012 aged 19. Initially she played events such as weddings, and later the Sheraton Hotel and parties in Downtown Phoenix. She moved away from rave and played more disco house, collaborating with Eric Daily on Deux Yeux, a French house and nu-disco duo. She got the name "Mija" (Spanish slang for "my daughter") as a nickname from her then-boyfriend. Billboard listed her among "15 Female DJs You Need to Know Now" in October 2015.

Giles describes her musical style as "fk a genre", not liking to be categorised. Her manager is Jeffrey O'Neill of Blood Company and her agents are Paradigm Talent Agency. Giles feels that she has been the equal of her male peers and that the male domination of the EDM scene is slowly changing.

In 2015, MIJA started Fk A Genre, a tour & promotion brand that programs diverse genres of music into a single show. "It (Fk A Genre) gave artists free range to do whatever they wanted to do, and not what their normal fan base expected."

In 2016, Giles launched Made By Mija, a fashion brand based out of Los Angeles, where she is the primary designer.

On February 26, 2020, Mija released her debut full-length album, Desert Trash, via Never B Alone / Create Music Group, with Mija's vocals, songwriting, guitar, piano and production.

2024 Mija moved to Berlin, Germany and joined label and agency Hot Meal Records

=== Breakthrough ===
In June 2014, she played at the Bonnaroo Music Festival in Tennessee on the Burning Man art car Kalliope after being spotted at a local gig in Phoenix on her 22nd birthday the weekend before. She played the "sunrise set" at 6 a.m. and Skrillex, who had been driving around in a golf cart as the silent disco was closed, came across the stage and asked to play a back-to-back set with her, though Mija is not sure he recognised her from when she had booked him in Phoenix. The set received significant attention, but Giles was unaware their sets had been recorded until two weeks later. That August, she played Burning Man and then in September of that year she played TomorrowWorld in Atlanta on the Black Butter Records stage after winning a mix contest. She began to learn production and organised a tour in Mexico. Encouraged by Skrillex, she moved to Downtown Los Angeles in October 2014.

=== Appearances ===
In March 2015, she played at Miami Music Week in Miami, then in April she played Coachella. That June she did a back-to-back set with Anna Lunoe in LA, before they performed in the Full Flex Express Tour around Canada over eight nights. In August she played at the Shambhala and HARD Summer music festivals, playing a remix of Major Lazer's Be Together. In September–October 2015, she did a sick af. World Tour, ending in Asia supporting Skrillex's tour. She was the only female performer on the lineup for the Road to Ultra in Singapore and the Philippines, closing the Philippines festival with Skrillex on stage. She announced her second world tour "sick af. V2" from February to May 2016 of the US, Canada, Mexico and Australia.

=== Releases ===
On Skrillex's label Owsla, which she has described as being like a family, she released "Crank It" with Ghastly featuring Lil Jon, her first music video. She has also released a remix of Major Lazer's "Be Together", and is planning an EP release. In January 2016, she remixed "Come Running" by Darren Styles and "Middle" by DJ Snake.

Regarding the release of her first full-length album in 2020, in interviews Mija described the project as a personal journey. "I needed to step outside of my comfort zone and into something that would become a catalyst for my next development as an artist," she said in a press release. "I wrote this album with the intention of stripping down all the excess and focusing on what truly matters to me; self-expression, realness, and the story."

Giles remains an independent/unsigned artist. She has released collaborations on labels, Owsla and Fools Gold.

== Discography ==
| Year | Artist | Track/Album | Label |
|---|---|---|---|
| 2014 | Aden X Claude VonStroke X Kill Frenzy | "Whip It Down Girl (Mija Mashup)" | Self-released |
| 2014 | Diplo feat. Angger Dimas & Travis Porter | "Biggie Bounce (Ghastly x Mija Ass & Titties Mix)" | Self-released |
| 2014 | Anna Lunoe | "BBD V NBD (Mija Mashup)" | Self-released |
| 2014 | Ghastly & Mija feat. Lil Jon | "Crank It" | Owsla |
| 2015 | Major Lazer feat. Wild Belle | "B2GETHER (Mija Remix)" | Self-released |
| 2016 | Darren Styles | "Come Running (Mija Remix)" | Never B Alone |
| 2016 | Zimmer feat. Emilie Adams | "Escape (Durante Remix) [Mija x Fan Fiction NXC Edit]" | Never B Alone |
| 2016 | DJ Snake feat. Bipolar Sunshine | "Middle (Mija Remix)" | Owsla |
| 2016 | Mija & Vindata | "Better" | Owsla |
| 2016 | Massive Attack | "Paradise Circus (Mija Remix)" | Never B Alone |
| 2016 | A-Trak & Tommy Trash | "Lose My Mind (Mija Remix)" | Fool's Gold Records |
| 2017 | Mija | "Secrets" | Never B Alone |
| 2017 | Mija | "Time Stops" | Never B Alone |
| 2017 | Mija | "That One Time [...]" | Never B Alone |
| 2017 | Mija | "Never B Alone" | Never B Alone |
| 2018 | Mija | "D!e [alt]" | Never B Alone |
| 2018 | Mija | "Notice Me" | Never B Alone |
| 2018 | Mija feat. Kelli Schaefer | "Bad For U (feat. Kelli Schaefer)" | Never B Alone |
| 2018 | Mija | "5AM in Paris" | Never B Alone |
| 2018 | Mija | "Never Forget" | Never B Alone |
| 2018 | Mija | "Falling ApART (again)" | Never B Alone |
| 2018 | Mija | "The Last Song I Ever Wrote U" | Never B Alone |
| 2018 | Alice Glass | "Without Love (Mija Remix)" | Loma Vista Recordings |
| 2020 | Mija | Desert Trash | Never B Alone / Create Group |
| 2021 | Mija | "Alexandrine" | |
| 2021 | Mija & Sharks! | "Distance" | |
| 2022 | Mija | "Groove" | Insomniac Records |
