= Gammer =

English music producer and DJ (born 1985)

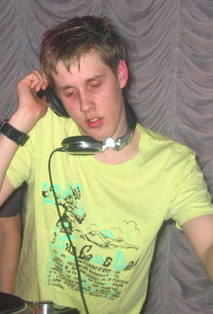
- Gammer in 2000

Background information
- Born: Matthew Lee; 1 October 1985 (age 40); Northampton, England
- Genres: UK hardcore; happy hardcore; trap; hardstyle; dubstep
- Occupations: Music producer; disc jockey
- Years active: 2000–present
- Labels: Monstercat; Essential Platinum; Muffin; AWsum; Maximum Impact; Nukleuz; Quosh; Together We Rise; Dim Mak

Matthew Lee (born 1 October 1985), known professionally by his stage name Gammer, is an English music producer and DJ. He is best known for his association with UK hardcore, of which he is described as an icon. He is also the co-founder of the Together We Rise record label, which is dedicated to hardcore music.

== Biography ==
Regarded as one of the most prolific producers in the United Kingdom hardcore scene, Gammer initially began his musical career as a hard dance producer before switching to hardcore. He has also produced many UK hardcore songs under the name Matt Lee. One track in particular, Go, caught the attention of Andy Whitby, who signed him to AWsum.

Gammer first appeared in the hardcore scene in 2002 and has since released songs under the Essential Platinum label. A large majority of his songs on the label come from collaborations with Dougal, the label's founder who discovered him, although he also released under his own label, Muffin Music. He also releases with other artists of the hardcore genre, such as Hixxy and Darren Styles. His songs have also appeared in compilation albums, such as Bonkers.

In 2006, Gammer released A New Feeling, which was awarded "Song of the Year" at the Hardcore Heaven Awards. In April 2007, he founded Muffin Music, releasing a promotional mix. Between 2008 and 2012, he was awarded "Hardcore DJ of the Year", an award previously held by Darren Styles. His 2010 award is shared with Dougal.

Gammer has been featured on BBC Radio 1 a number of times, including performing mixes for the Kutski show in 2011 and 2012.

In 2016, he participated with Styles at the 20th edition of the Electric Daisy Carnival in Las Vegas. The pair would also headline the Darren Styles b2b Gammer event in 2017.

Gammer has often released on the label Monstercat, where he's released tracks such as "Party Don't Stop", "Over the Edge", and an extended play, The Drop, whose title track became one of the most played festival dubstep songs of 2018 with eleven official remixes. Gammer has collaborated with fellow producer Kayzo for multiple songs including "Forever" and "Over the Edge", the latter of which was released on 11 August 2018. In July 2017, Gammer collaborated with Darren Styles and Dougal to release the single "Party Don't Stop" and the trio also released in September 2018 the single "Burning Up", both of which were released via Monstercat, the latter being part of their collaboration with the game Rocket League.

In January 2019, his remix of Ran-D's track, "Zombie", having been played in numerous live sets and mixes while still unreleased, was released on Armada as part of a 2 track remix package.

In 2021, Gammer began releasing singles from his upcoming debut full-length album through Dim Mak Records, including "Stampede" with Fatman Scoop, "NGMF" with Riot Ten, and "Replay the Night" with Staysick and Nytrix.

== Discography ==
=== Albums ===
- 2012: Dougal and Gammer's Hardcore Anthems
- 2018: Yabai

=== Extended plays ===
- 2008: When I Close My Eyes
- 2010: The 'Im Sorry These Songs Took So Long To Get Out' EP - Part 1
- 2010: The 'Im Sorry These Songs Took So Long To Get Out' EP - Part 2
- 2010: Insert Ep Title
- 2010: The Gammer Remix EP
- 2013: Dougal & Gammer EP
- 2014: Dougal & Gammer EP Vol. 2
- 2014: Darren Styles & Gammer EP
- 2017: The Drop
  - 2018: The Drop (The Remixes Pt.1)
  - 2018: The Drop (The Remixes Pt.2)
- 2022: Better Together

=== Singles ===
- 2010: "Anybody Else But You" (with Dougal)
- 2016: "Love You Everyday" (with Whizzkid)
- 2017: "Love You Everyday: Redux" (with Whizzkid)
- 2016: "Burn You Tonight" (with Galaxy Fox)
- 2016: "Pigface (Dougal and Gammer Edit)"
- 2016: "Never Stop" (with Dougal)
- 2016: "Jaws 2016"
- 2016: "Shoulder Lock" (with Dougal)
- 2017: "Feel Like This" (with Darren Styles)
- 2017: "Red Drink Foam Party"
- 2017: "Party Don't Stop" (with Darren Styles and Dougal)
- 2017: "Over the Edge" (with Kayzo featuring Au8ust)
- 2017: "Let's Get Crunk"
- 2017: "Stay Tonight" (featuring Dylan Matthew)
- 2018: "Big Tings" (with Darren Styles)
- 2018: "Needed U"
- 2018: "Forever" (with Kayzo)
- 2018: "Burning Up" (with Darren Styles and Dougal)
- 2018: "Sleep at Night" (with Yultron)
- 2018: "Out with the Old" (featuring Sam King)
- 2018: "Blow This" (with Dougal)
- 2019: "Crank Up the Dank" (with Stonebank)
- 2019: "This is the End" (featuring David Spekter)
- 2019: "EDM Sucks" (with Showtek)
- 2020: "Dysylm" (with Darren Styles)
- 2020: "I'm With You" (with Da Tweekaz)
- 2020: "The Feeling" (with Henry Fong)
- 2021: "Stampede" (featuring Fatman Scoop)
- 2021: "Ngmf" (with Riot Ten)
- 2021: "Replay the Night" (with Staysick featuring Nytrix)
- 2021: "Superhorn" (with Darren Styles)
- 2022 "Step Back" (with Pixel Terror)
- 2023: "Roots" (Featuring RUNN)

=== Remixes ===
- 2015: Omegatypez - "Take Me High" (Kutski & Gammer Remix)
- 2016: Porter Robinson - "Sad Machine (Darren Styles & Gammer Remix)
- 2016: Kill the Noise - "All in My Head (feat. Awolnation)" (Darren Styles and Gammer Remix)
- 2016: Kayzo - "Born Again" (Darren Styles & Gammer Remix)
- 2017: Crankdat - "Dollars" (Crankdat, Ray Volpe and Gammer Remix)
- 2017: Pegboard Nerds x Quiet Disorder - "Go Berzerk" (Gammer Remix)
- 2017: Slander - "Superhuman" (featuring Eric Leva) (Gammer Remix)
- 2018: Valentino Khan - "Lick It" (Gammer Remix)
- 2018: A-Trak & Baauer - "Dumbo Drop" (Gammer Remix)
- 2019: Ran-D - "Zombie" (Gammer Remix)
- 2019: Space Laces - "Torque" (Gammer Remix)
