= Bear Grillz =

American DJ and producer

- Bear Grillz's previously used official logo

Background information
- Born: Robert James Pangelinan; January 5, 1979 (age 47); Los Angeles County, California, U.S.
- Origin: Denver, Colorado, U.S.
- Genres: Dubstep; Drumstep; Bass music; EDM
- Years active: 2013–present
- Labels: Dim Mak; Firepower; Monstercat
- Website: www.beargrillz.com

Robert James Pangelinan (born January 5, 1979), better known as Bear Grillz, is an American electronic dance music DJ and record producer based in Denver, Colorado. He appeared on The Jerry Springer Show to reveal his identity, which was previously hidden in a bear costume. Using a MacBook Pro, he watched music production tutorials on YouTube prior to developing his musical career.

Since 2016, Bear Grillz showed off his new Bear Head at venue show in Sioux City, Iowa that can light up. It replaced the bear costume that he's worm since inception.

== Discography ==
=== Studio albums ===
Title	Details	Peak chart positions
Title	Details	US Dance
Demons	Released: May 17, 2019; Label: Dim Mak Records; Format: Digital download	—
Friends: The Album	Released: December 4, 2020; Label: Dim Mak Records; Format: Digital download	—
Prismata (Light & Dark)	Released: July 24, 2022; Label: Rude Service; Format: Digital download	—
"—" denotes an album that did not chart or was not released.

=== Extended plays ===
Title	Details	Peak chart positions
Title	Details	US Dance
The High Grade	Released: November 19, 2013; Label: Firepower Records; Format: Digital download	–
They Made Us Change The Name	Released: March 11, 2014; Label: Firepower Records; Format: Digital download	–
Bear Grillz & Friends	Released: August 5, 2014; Label: Firepower Records; Format: Digital download	–
The Unbearable	Released: January 27, 2015; Label: Firepower Records; Format: Digital download	–
Bear Grillz & Friends Volume 2	Released: June 2, 2015; Label: Firepower Records; Format: Digital download	–
EDM Remixed	Released: November 27, 2015; Label: Firepower Records; Format: Digital download	–
Mo Honey Mo Problems	Released: April 22, 2016; Label: Firepower Records; Format: Digital download	25
Half Man, Half Bear	Released: November 22, 2017; Label: Self-Released; Format: Digital download	–
TOO LOUD	Released: November 2, 2018; Label: Dim Mak Records; Format: Digital download	–
Reanimated	Released: March 13, 2020; Label: Dim Mak Records; Format: Digital download	–
Ground Zero	Released: July 24, 2020; Label: Dim Mak Records; Format: Digital download	–

=== Singles ===
- 2014: "#Thirsty"
- 2015 "Fuck Off" (with Datsik)
- 2017: "The Game" (featuring Figure)
- 2018: "Mayweather"
- 2018: "Drop That"
- 2018: "Wicked" (featuring Sullivan King)
- 2018: "Take Me Away"
- 2019: "Out Of My Body" (featuring Karra)
- 2019: "The Way We Were" (with Haliene)
- 2020: "Smile Without U" (featuring Nevve)
- 2020: "Save Us From Ourselves" (Arknights Soundtrack) (featuring Micah Martin)
- 2020: "Turning Point"
- 2020: "Fire"
- 2020: "Where We Are" (with Adventure Club and JT Roach)
- 2020: "Scumbag" (with Dion Timmer featuring Atarii)
- 2020: "Run It" (with Riot Ten featuring Bok Nero)
- 2024: "Play the Game" (with Adventure Club featuring Craig Mabbitt of Escape the Fate)
