= Dilapidation Celebration =

EP by Slander and Kayzo
- Released: 27 October 2017
- Recorded: 2017
- Genre: Hardpsy; future bass
- Length: 7:25
- Label: Monstercat
- Producer: Derek Andersen; Scott Land; Hayden Capuozzo

Kayzo chronology
Dilapidation Celebration (2017)	Overload (2018)

Slander chronology
Duality (2016)	Dilapidation Celebration (2017)	The Headbangers Ball (2018)

Singles from Dilapidation Celebration
- 1. "Without You" Released: September 29, 2017; 2. "Holy" Released: October 27, 2017

Dilapidation Celebration is a collaborative extended play by the Los Angeles–based electronic duo Slander and the Houston-based electronic producer Kayzo. Dilapidation Celebration was released on October 27, 2017, by the independent electronic music label, Monstercat.

== Background and composition ==
On September 27, 2017, a month before release, Slander announced Dilapidation Celebration, a collaborative extended play with Kayzo. On September 29, the extended play's first single was released, titled Without You, featuring vocals by Dylan Matthew. On October 27, the extended play was released along with its second single, "Holy", featuring vocals by Micah Martin.

== Reception and release ==
Drew Troxler of We Own The Nite NYC praised "Without You", writing, "Beginning with a slow and melodic-driven guitar riff that leads into deeply captivating that are sure to pull heartstrings. With an echoing build up that gravitates to a futuristic drop filled with electronic loops and sweet synths, “Without You” is a surefire crowd charmer."

Scott Lombardo of EDMTunes generally liked Holy, stating "“Holy” is epic from start to finish, and its theatrical intro makes it the perfect track to kick off a set full of banging music. The vocals give it the feel of an alt-rock tune, but the subdued vocals eventually give way to an increasing tempo and intensity that explodes with energy."

== Track listing ==
Digital download – EP
No.	Title	Length
1.	"Without You" (featuring Dylan Matthew)	3:45
2.	"Holy" (featuring Micah Martin)	3:50
Total length:		7:25

== Release history ==
Region	Date	Format	Label	Ref.
Various	October 27, 2017	Digital download	Monstercat	
