= The Headbangers Ball =

EP by Slander
- Released: November 29, 2018
- Recorded: 2018
- Genre: Dubstep
- Length: 12:42
- Label: Monstercat
- Producer: Derek Anderson; Scott Land; Mischa Reining; Tom Davidson; Daniel Magid

Slander chronology
Dilapidation Celebration (2017)	The Headbangers Ball (2018)	Thrive (2022)

Singles from The Headbangers Ball
- 1. "You Don't Even Know Me" Released: September 20, 2018; 2. "Running To You" Released: November 15, 2018; 3. "Hate Being Alone" Released: November 29, 2018

The Headbangers Ball is the fourth extended play by American electronic music duo Slander. Canadian independent electronic label Monstercat released the EP on November 29, 2018. The extended play was released with three singles, a North American tour and later gathered generally positive reviews.

== Background and release ==
The initial concept of The Headbangers Ball came to be during Slander's residency in Las Vegas, thinking of it as a "mansion party set in the Great Gatsby era but with undead skeletons as our attendees." In an interview with Billboard Dance, the duo spoke about the concept and influences about the extended play, stating:

"We aimed to create three solid vocal dubstep songs, essentially mimicking the vibe we conceptualised for the tour. The emotional vocals represent the more upscale elements of the Ball, and the dubstep drops represent the more dark, grungy appearance of the attendees. To us, The Headbangers Ball also represents a new evolution of the SLANDER sound into a more heavy bass arena that still sends backtraces to our original melodic sound via the vocals we chose."

— Slander talking about the influences they had used for the production of the extended play.

To promote the release of The Headbangers Ball, the extended play's three songs were released as singles. Its lead single, "You Don't Even Know Me" was released on September 20, 2018, "Running To You" on November 15, 2018, and "Hate Being Alone" on November 29, 2018. On November 29, 2018, the extended play was released exclusively as a digital download on international digital stores through Monstercat. Following the extended play's release, Slander began their The Headbangers Ball North American tour on January 11, 2019, at the Hollywood Palladium in Los Angeles.

== Critical reception ==
The Headbangers Ball was well received by most critics. Writing for Billboard, Koury Angelo compared the extended play to the MTV show of the same name, writing that the "DJs are the rock stars, and Los Angeles-based duo SLANDER [sic] brings all those elements into a fresh and frenzied sound all its own". Writing for Dancing Astronaut, Chris Stack described the songs of the extended play as having a stark contrast with each other, writing that "each track places fluffy vocals and lush melodies at the helm of harder-hitting electronic elements, from dubstep and future bass." Noiseporn's Ria Qi described the three songs as each featuring unique elements, highlighting the "soothing melody and enthralling vocal in "You Don’t Even Know Me," the piercing, frenzied rhythm in "Running To You" and the heartfelt lyrics and heavy percussion in "Hate Being Alone.""

== Track listing ==
Digital download
No.	Title	Producer(s)	Length
1.	"You Don't Even Know Me" (with Riot)	Derek Andersen; Scott Land; Tom Davidson; Daniel Magid	3:46
2.	"Running to You" (with Spag Heddy, featuring Elle Vee)	Derek Andersen; Scott Land; Mischa Reining	5:00
3.	"Hate Being Alone" (featuring Dylan Matthew)	Derek Andersen; Scott Land	3:56
Total length:			12:42

== Release history ==
Region	Date	Format	Label	Ref.
Various	November 29, 2018	Digital download; streaming	Monstercat	
