= Whistle Wars =

Single by Kayzo
- Released: May 30, 2017
- Genre: Dubstep, trap
- Length: 3:39
- Label: Welcome Records

"Whistle Wars" is a song by American DJ Kayzo. It was released on May 30, 2017, via Welcome Records.

== Background ==
The song received a release date after a year of being performed at music festivals as an "ID" (unknown title). Kayzo incorporated 'hard-hitting' bass, a 'killer' drop and an intense beat to the song. It was described as genre-bending and bass-stomping.

== Track listing ==
No.	Title	Length
1.	"Whistle Wars"	3:39
Total length:		3:39
