= Potions (song) =

Single by Slander and Said the Sky featuring JT Roach

from the album Monstercat Instinct, Vol. 4
- Released: May 31, 2019
- Length: 3:36
- Label: Monstercat
- Songwriter: JT Roach
- Producers: Derek Andersen; Scott Land; Trevor Christensen

Slander singles chronology
"Love Is Gone" (2019)	"Potions" (2019)	"Broken" (2019)

Said the Sky singles chronology
"Superstar" (2018)	"Potions" (2019)	"Already Know" (2019)

JT Roach singles chronology
"Shivers" (2018)	"Potions" (2019)

Music video
- "Potions" on YouTube

"Potions" is a song by American DJ duo Slander and American electronic dance music producer Said the Sky, featuring singer-songwriter JT Roach. It was released on May 31, 2019, by Canadian record label Monstercat and was later included on their compilation album Monstercat Instinct, Vol. 4.

== Background and release ==
"Potions" debuted at the Crush Arizona music festival in mid-February 2019. On May 24, 2019, both Slander and Said the Sky individually announced the release date for the song and its accompanying music video, with the song's release date being announced as May 31 and its music video a day earlier, on May 30.

On May 31, 2019, the song was released as a digital download on international digital stores through Canadian record label Monstercat, as well as being released through various music streaming services. A music video was released a day earlier, by Proximity via their YouTube channel on May 30, 2019.

== Track listing ==
- Single release

No.	Title	Length
1.	"Potions"	3:36

- Acoustic version

No.	Title	Length
1.	"Potions (Acoustic)"	3:23

- Remix pack

No.	Title	Length
1.	"Potions (Au5 Remix)"	4:49
2.	"Potions (William Black Remix)"	3:32
3.	"Potions (Blanke Remix)"	4:17
4.	"Potions (Eliminate Remix)"	3:45
5.	"Potions (Tisoki Remix)"	4:19
6.	"Potions (Mazare Remix)"	3:35
7.	"Potions (Hekler Remix)"	3:34
8.	"Potions (TYNAN Remix)"	3:37
9.	"Potions (Stonebank Remix)"	3:21
10.	"Potions (Brondo Remix)"	4:44
11.	"Potions (Danny Olsen Remix)"	4:10
Total length:		43:43

- Special Remix

No.	Title	Length
1.	"Potions (SLANDER & Bossfight Remix)"	3:58

== Critical reception ==
"Potions" was well received by most critics. Ross Goldenberg of Dancing Astronaut praised the song, calling it an "obvious front runner for one of the year’s strongest releases", writing that Slander and Said the Sky are "established gurus at generating tear-jerking productions and "Potions" admirably falls in harmony." EDMTunes' Vilma Salamanca called the collaboration a "heartfelt song we didn’t know we needed", describing the work between the vocalist JT Roach and the three producers a "match made in heaven; like a beautiful amalgam." Writing for Run the Trap, Peach Gallagher described the track as a "melodic storm of emotions guaranteed to hit you directly in the feels." Brian Bonavoglia of DJ Times commended the song, calling it an "emotionally charged masterpiece that has already become quite the fan favourite serving as another magical addition to their flawless discography."

== Release history ==
Region	Date	Format	Version	Label	Ref.
Various	May 31, 2019	Digital download; streaming	"Potions" (feat. JT Roach)	Monstercat	
