= Crankdat =

American electronic music producer

- Born: Christian Smith; March 2, 1997 (age 29); Youngstown, Ohio, U.S.
- Genres: Electronic; dubstep; trap; drum and bass
- Occupation: DJ
- Instruments: Digital audio workstation; synthesizer
- Years active: 2015–present
- Labels: Disciple; Kannibalen; Monstercat; Welcome
- Website: crankdat.com

Christian Smith (born March 2, 1997), known professionally as Crankdat, is an American DJ and electronic dance music producer.

== Early life ==
Smith grew up desiring to be an athlete, but ultimately turned down a full-ride track-and-field scholarship to Kent State University to pursue music, producing energetic and melodically vibrant electronic dance music as Crankdat. Smith began making music while still in high school.

== Career ==
Smith originally gained recognition for remixing other artists' tracks, including Fetty Wap's breakout single, "Trap Queen." Eventually these remixes racked up millions of plays and Smith, barely out of his teens, was getting attention from bigger names in electronic dance music such as Skrillex and The Chainsmokers.

Crankdat released original tracks as he toured, including the Jauz collaboration "I Hold Still" as well as the triumphant "Dollars", both in 2017. In 2019, Crankdat embarked on his ambitious, "Gearworld", tour.

== Discography ==
=== Remix Albums ===
Remix Machine Mixtape [All self-released]

- Volume 1: November 29, 2022
- Volume 2: August 15, 2024
- Volume 3: December 4, 2025

=== Extended plays ===
List of extended plays
Title	Details
Gearworld Volume 1	Released: April 21, 2019; Label: Welcome Records; Formats: Digital download
Fearworld	Released: October 25, 2019; Label: Get Cranked; Formats: Digital download
Mechanised Mayhem	Released: March 11, 2020; Label: Disciple; Formats: Digital download
Sad Robot	Released: August 5, 2021; Label: Monstercat; Formats: Digital download
Slaughter House	Released: April 14, 2023; Label: Monstercat; Formats: Digital download

=== Singles ===
2016

- "Game Over" (with Lookas) [Loko Records]
- "Stoopid Rich" (with Havok Roth featuring Titus) [Brednbutter]

2017

- "I Hold Still" (with Jauz featuring Slushii) [Self-released]
- "Dollars" [Asylum Worldwide]
- "In The Air" (featuring T-Pain) [Dubset Media]

2018

- "Reasons To Run" [Asylum Worldwide]
- "Need Somebody" [Asylum Worldwide]
- "Lemme See U" (with Ghastly) [Self-released]
- "Say It" (featuring Sara Skinner) [Armada Music]
- "Kneel Before Me" (with Slander featuring Asking Alexandria) [Monstercat / Sumerian Records]
- "Wobble" (with Tisoki) [Monstercat]

2019

- "Welcome to the Jungle" (featuring Sara Skinner) [Welcome Records]
- "Monster" (featuring Hyro the Hero) [Welcome Records]
- "Do You Mind" (featuring Shybeast) [Welcome Records]
- "Next Life" (with Adventure Club featuring Krewella) [Ultra Records]
- "Falling" [Monstercat]
- "Phantoms Cry"

2020

- "Who I Am" [Monstercat]
- "Redo" [Monstercat]
- "Poppin'" (with Void (0)) [Kannibalen Records]
- "Badfuture" [Welcome Records]
- "Tell Me" [Monstercat]
- "Dark Room" [Monstercat]
- "Underground Shit" (with Nvadrz) [Welcome Records]

2021

- "Better Without You" (featuring JT Roach) [Monstercat]
- "The Feeling" (with Ace Aura) [Monstercat]
- "The Same" (featuring Neverwaves) [Welcome Records]
- "Weight of the World" [Subsidia]
- "Lasers" (with Ruvlo) [Disciple]

2022

- "Ding Dong" [Monstercat]
- "Power Stone" [Monstercat]

2023

- "Move Back" (featuring Savage) [Monstercat]
- "HEAT" (with Shaquille O'Neal/DIESEL) [Monstercat]
- "STFU"

2024

- "Big Bang" (with DJ Snake) [Interscope Records]
- "Open The Pit" (featuring Juicy J) [Monstercat]

2025

- "Whiplash" (featuring SOFI)
- "TYPE SH*T" (featuring NGHTMRE and Duke Deuce)

2026

- "Movement"

=== Remixes ===
2015

- Fetty Wap — "Trap Queen" (Crankdat Remix)

2016

- Eptic — "The End" (Carnage and Breaux Remix) (Crankdat VIP)
- Elephante (featuring Trouze and Damon Sharpe) — "Age Of Innocence" (Crankdat Remix)
- Wiwek and Skrillex — "Killa" (Crankdat VIP)
- Lost Kings (featuring Katelyn Tarver) — "You" (Crankdat Remix)
- Desiigner — "Panda" (Crankdat, Hearts and Nati Remix)
- Dillon Francis and Nghtmre — "Need You" (Crankdat and Sevim VIP)
- Graves and Coolights — "Say Things" (Crankdat Re-Crank)
- Joyryde — "The Box" (Crankdat Re-Crank)
- The Black Eyed Peas — "Rock That Body" (Crankdat Re-Crank)
- Jauz and Netsky — "Higher" (Crankdat Remix)
- Lil Yachty — "1 Night" (Crankdat Re-Crank)
- The Chainsmokers — "Closer" (Crankdat Re-Crank)
- Porter Robinson — "Unison" (Crankdat Re-Crank)
- Swedish House Mafia — "Save The World" (Crankdat Re-Crank)
- DJ Fresh — "Louder" (Crankdat Re-Crank)
- Skrillex (featuring Sirah) — "Weekends" (Crankdat Re-Crank)

2017

- San Holo — "Light" (Crankdat Remix)
- Alison Wonderland and M-Phazes — "Messiah" (Crankdat Re-Crank)
- Zeds Dead and NGHTMRE — "Frontlines" (Crankdat Remix)
- Mija — "Secrets" (Crankdat Remix)
- DJ Snake — "Here Comes The Night" (Crankdat Remix)
- Gryffin and Illenium (featuring Daya) — "Feel Good" (Crankdat Remix)
- Matoma and MAGIC! (featuring D.R.A.M.) — "Girl At Coachella" (Crankdat Remix)
- Blackbear —"IDFC" (Crankdat Re-Crank)
- Zeds Dead — "Ratchet" (Crankdat Dubstep Re-Crank)
- Crankdat — "Dollars" (Crankdat, Ray Volpe and Gammer Remix)
- Post Malone — "Rockstar" (Crankdat Remix)

2018

- Jaden Smith — "The Icon" (Crankdat Re-Crank)
- Bryce Vine — "Drew Barrymore" (Crankdat Remix)
- Famous Dex (featuring ASAP Rocky) — "Pick It Up" (Crankdat Remix)
- Travis Scott — "No Bystanders" (Crankdat Re-Crank)
- Travis Scott — "Sicko Mode" (Crankdat Re-Crank)
- Travis Scott — "Wake Up" (Crankdat Re-Crank)
- Sheck Wes — "Mo Bamba" (Crankdat Re-Crank)
- Nghtmre and ASAP Ferg — "Redlight" (Crankdat Remix)

2020

- Crankdat and Void (0) — "Poppin'" (VIP Mix)

2021

- MunchKing and CC is Dreaming - "Passive Aggressive" (Crankdat Remix)

2022

- Steve Aoki & Afrojack (featuring Miss Palmer) - "No Beef" (Riot Ten and Crankdat Remix)
- Ray Volpe (featuring Virus Syndicate) - "Revolution" (Crankdat Remix)
- The Chainsmokers - "High" (Crankdat Remix)
- Mark Tuan - Far Away (Crankdat remix)
