= Slander (DJs) =

American DJ duo

SLANDER
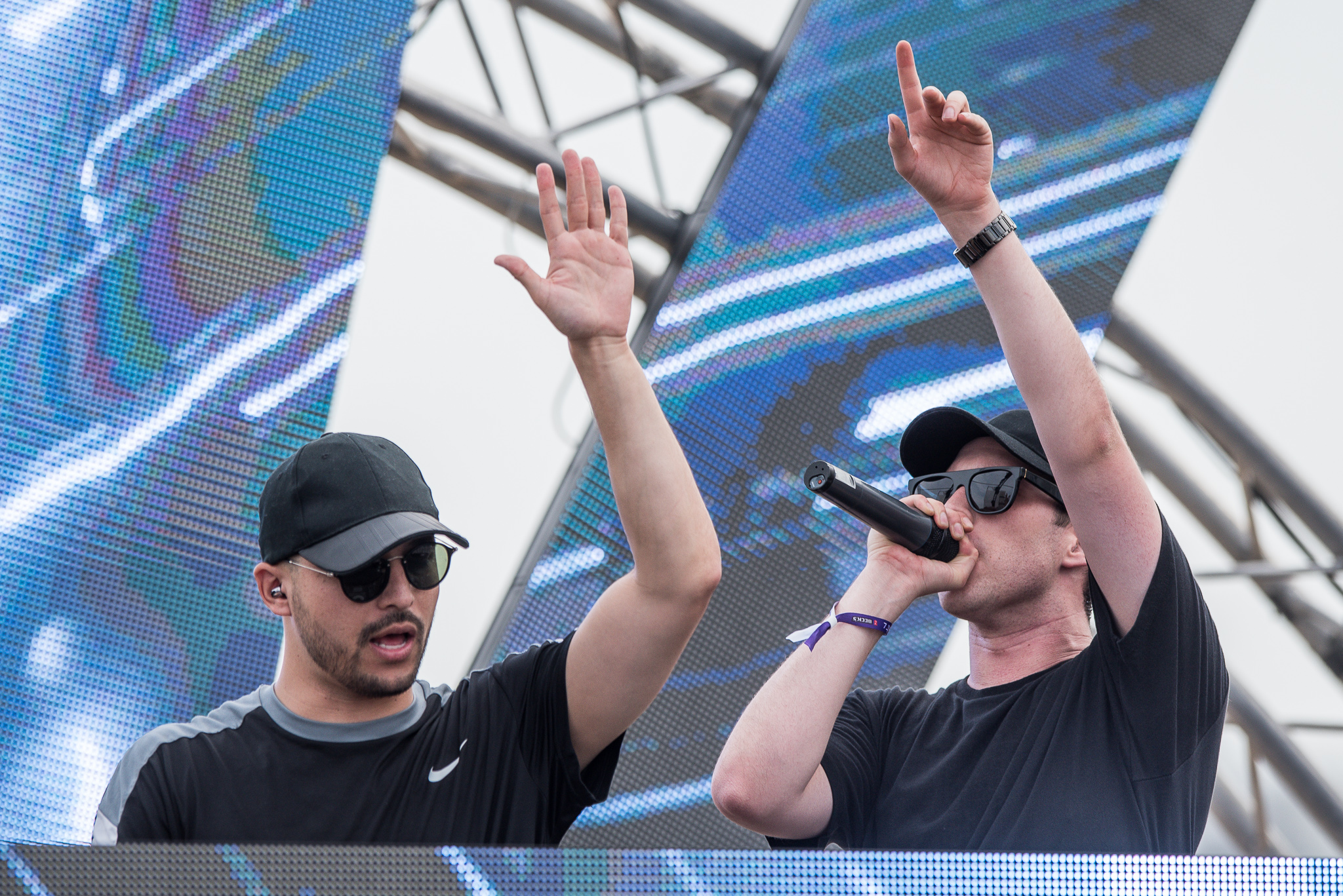
- Andersen and Land at the 2016 Open Beatz Festival

Background information
- Origin: Los Angeles, California, U.S.
- Genres: Future bass; Dubstep; House; Trap
- Occupations: DJs; musicians; producers
- Instrument: Digital audio workstation
- Works: Slander discography
- Years active: 2013–present
- Labels: Disciple; Gud Vibrations; Heaven Sent; Mad Decent; Monstercat; Never Say Die
- Members: Derek Andersen; Scott Land
- Website: slanderofficial.com

Slander (stylized in all caps) is an American DJ duo consisting of Derek Andersen and Scott Land based in Los Angeles, California. The duo owns two record labels: Gud Vibrations (co-owners with Nghtmre) and Heaven Sent.

== Early life ==
Andersen and Land met at their fraternity, Kappa Sigma, in University of California, Irvine. They later went to and graduated from Icon Collective, a music production school together with Nghtmre. Andersen said: "My relationship with Tyler (Nghtmre) came out of nowhere when we were put in the same classroom at Icon Collective together." They initially played gigs for their college friends and at local venues. The name Slander was combined from the duo's real names: "S(cott) Land" and "Ander(sen)". They have performed at EDC (Las Vegas, Orlando and Mexico), Nocturnal Wonderland, Electric Zoo, Sun City Music Festival, Electric Forest, and Ultra Music Festival.

== Career ==
=== 2014: We Like to Party remix ===
Slander's remix of Showtek's song "We Like to Party" had surpassed 12 million plays on YouTube. It was also credited as Slander's rise to success and popularity. They exchanged their remix with Nghtmre's before combining them in a studio at Icon Collective. Their remix of Above & Beyond's "Love Is Not Enough" was described as pure "heaven trap", a trap-trance combination genre pioneered by Slander. They collaborated with Nghtmre for a single titled "Ascension". A long-term residency deal was signed by Slander with XS Las Vegas. In December 2014, they released "Vanguard" as a single. The group remixed Arty's "Up All Night", Gorgon City's "Here For You" and Sam F's "When Will the Bass Drop".

=== 2015: Nghtmre collaborations ===
They released an EP titled "Nuclear Bonds" together with Nghtmre on Diplo's record label Mad Decent. A single titled "Gud Vibrations" from the EP was released. Slander's song "Love Again" featuring Wavz was released as a free download. They released "You" as a single with frequent-collaborator Nghtmre. Two more Slander-Nghtmre collaborations titled "Power" and "Warning" were released. They were signed as residents of Wynn Resorts for 2015. GTA's "Red Lips" was remixed by Slander and Nghtmre.

=== 2016: Duality ===
Slander released the song "After All" as a collaboration with Yookie and Jinzo. It was released through the British record label Never Say Die Records. They also went on tour with Nghtmre. It was as part of the "Gud Vibrations" North American tour. They performed at Tomorrowland 2016 alongside Nghtmre and Snails. Their nine-song EP titled "Duality" featured originals and remixes of the songs "Dead" and "Love Again". It was released on November 18, 2016, through Mad Decent. They later collaborated with Adam K, Matthew Steeper, and Haliene. They released "Breathe" as a single. They remixed Jack Ü's song "Mind". Kill The Noise's "Kill It 4 The Kids" was remixed by Slander.

=== 2017–present: Drop It and Monstercat releases, Thrive ===
Slander collaborated with Basstrick. They released "Drop It" as a single. They launched a weekly radio show called "Gud Vibrations Radio" with Nghtmre on SiriusXM. Slander started releasing on Canadian electronic music record label Monstercat on June 23, 2017, with "Superhuman". The duo released "Without You" with Kayzo and featuring Dylan Matthew on September 29, 2017. Slander and Kayzo also released "Holy" featuring Micah Martin and their collaborative EP "Dilapidation Celebration" on October 27, 2017. In December 2017, Slander released a collaboration with Sullivan King titled "Welcome to the Fire" on the record label Disciple Recordings.

The duo proceeded to release many singles on Monstercat in 2018, including "Happy Now" on March 2, "Slow Motion" featuring Bret James on June 1, "So Long" featuring Juliana Chahayed on June 29. Monstercat, alongside American rock music record label Sumerian Records, released the duo and Crankdat's "Kneel Before Me" featuring British metal band Asking Alexandria on August 9, 2018. It was highly praised by both the electronic music and rock industries. Towards the end of 2018, Slander released three singles leading up to their EP, "The Headbangers Ball": "You Don't Even Know Me" with Riot on September 20, "Running To You" with Spag Heddy featuring Elle Vee on November 15, and "Hate Being Alone" featuring Dylan Matthew on November 29. The EP was also released on November 29.

One month and four days before "Running To You" was released, Slander released their collaboration with Seven Lions and Dabin, titled "First Time". Slander's first release in 2019 was a collaboration with Gryffin featuring Calle Lehmann titled "All You Need To Know", which was released on March 27. On May 30, 2019, after many months of teasing, the music video for a collaboration with Said the Sky and JT Roach titled "Potions" was released. A day later, the song was released on all streaming platforms. On September 22, 2022, Slander released their debut studio album, Thrive. Dancing Astronaut describes it as a concept album that "tells a "cosmic love story" set in the near future and focused on a singular astronaut in search of a new home for mankind."

== Discography ==
=== Studio albums ===
- Thrive (2022)
