= Kayzo =

American DJ and record producer

- Born: Hayden Capuozzo; October 8, 1991 (age 34); Houston, Texas, U.S.
- Origin: Los Angeles, California, U.S.
- Genres: EDM; Hardstyle; trap; dubstep; house; electro; happy hardcore; psytrance; electronic rock
- Occupations: DJ; producer; musician; remixer
- Instrument: Digital audio workstation
- Years active: 2012–present
- Labels: Dim Mak; Monstercat; Barong Family; Firepower; Doghouse; Kannibalen; Sweet Shop; Welcome
- Website: www.kayzomusic.com

Hayden Capuozzo (born October 8, 1991), better known by his stage name Kayzo, is an American DJ based in Los Angeles, California. He is best known for remixing songs and incorporating trap and hardstyle genres into his remixes. His collaboration with Riot, "Wake Up", received more than 200,000 plays in less than 24 hours.

Kayzo is also the founder of Welcome Records.

== Early life ==
Kayzo grew up playing hockey in Utah. In 2012, he got accepted to Icon Collective, an electronic music production school based in Los Angeles. He graduated after 9 months. He used Massive as a plugin to produce synths on his MacBook laptop. Musically, he is described as a bass artist with 'aggressive sound' and elements of hardstyle, dubstep, and trap.

Kayzo's musical career began in 2012 when he was chosen as the winner of Insomniac's "Discovery Project" challenge. Winning the challenge allowed him to perform at Escape from Wonderland that year, which was also his first gig as a DJ.

== Career ==
In 2013, he released the single "Malfunktion 2.0" featuring vocal duo Duelle through Borgore's record label Buygore Records. He also collaborated with Slander for the single "Gettin Down" and with Jordan Alexander for the single "Recoil". On October 21, 2014, Kayzo collaborated with Australian musician Seek N Destroy to release the single "Crank", which was described as a heavy metallic sound with impactful sub bass. On December 16, 2014, he released "Fired Up" as an EP through Firepower Records. He was featured in "Future Sounds of EDM", a compilation by Krewella released on Ministry of Sound.

In July 2015, Kayzo collaborated with Dotcom to release "Take a Picture" featuring Sam King, as a free download. In December 2015, he released "Hasselhouse" on Steve Aoki's record label Dim Mak.

In 2016, he released his debut EP "Welcome To The Doghouse" via his own label Doghouse Recordings. He later collaborated with Barong Family artist Cesqeaux to release the single "Home". He also collaborated with Gammer on the single "Frequency". Kayzo featured on the Yultron song "Tempura Roll" alongside Ookay and Dotcom.

On March 24, 2017, Kayzo released "This Time" as a single on Canadian record label Monstercat. On May 30, 2017, "Whistle Wars" was released as a single, which was described as genre-bending and bass-stomping. He was featured in the MainStage lineup of Nameless Music Festival 2017, which will be held in Barzio, Italy, on June 2, 2017. On November 21, 2017, Kayzo announced that he would be dropping his debut album, "Overload" on January 19, 2018. On August 14, 2019, Kayzo released the follow-up album, “Unleashed” on Welcome Records. On June 24, 2022, Kayzo dropped his third full-length album, “New Breed” on Welcome Records.

== Personal life ==
Capuozzo is romantically partnered with Canadian DJ and musician Cray.

== Discography ==
- OVERLOAD (2018)
- Unleashed (2019)
- NEW BREED (2022)
