= Emergency Broadcast Network =

American multimedia performance group

- Origin: Providence, Rhode Island
- Genres: Electronica, plunderphonics
- Years active: 1991–1999, 2011
- Labels: TVT Records
- Past members: Joshua Pearson; Gardner Post; Brian Kane; Ron O'Donnell; Greg Deocampo; Tracy Brown; Mark Marinello

Emergency Broadcast Network is a multimedia performance group formed in 1991 that took its name from the Emergency Broadcast System. The founders were Rhode Island School of Design graduates Joshua Pearson, Gardner Post, and Brian Kane (author of the Vujak VJ software). Kane left EBN in 1992. The EBN Live Team included DJ Ron O'Donnell; video artist-technologist Greg Deocampo, founder of Company of Science and Art (CoSA); founding CTO of IFilm.com), artist-designer Tracy Brown; and programmer-technologist Mark Marinello.

== History ==
The first EBN video project was a musical remix of the Gulf War, created in 1991 as the war was still ongoing. Pearson cited their interest in how the media turned information about the war into entertainment as an inspiration for the band. The VHS tape of the remix project, which contained the George H. W. Bush "We Will Rock You" cover, became a viral underground hit, and was distributed widely by fans as bootleg copies. In the summer of 1991, EBN traveled with the first Lollapalooza tour, distributing tapes and showing their videos on a modified station wagon with TVs on the roof. The group also became well known for their media sculptures and stage props which were created by Gardner Post.

Bono of U2 took notice of their work and hired them to provide visuals for their Zoo TV Tour. EBN's video work featured prominently into the show, and their "We Will Rock You" cover was played at the beginning of each show. EBN also produced visuals for The Edge's performance of "Numb" on the 1993 MTV Video Music Awards. In addition to the visuals, audio from those clips were featured in the live performance to create rhythmic effects. In 1997, EBN collaborated with U2 for an MTV miniseries, ZooTV: The Television Program, which featured satirical videos and remixes. In 1998, EBN returned to the MTV Video Music Awards fold by designing the respective montage videos for the 1998 nominees announced in their signature "video scratching" style.

In 1996, the group contributed to the AIDS benefit album Offbeat: A Red Hot Soundtrip produced by the Red Hot Organization.

== Commercial Entertainment Product ==
Commercial Entertainment Product was released in 1992 on TVT Records. Spin called it "dizzyingly hypnotic, politically subversive sound-and-vision barrage that renders superfluous its repeated exhortation to 'try psychoactive drugs!'". Videos included a cover of "We Will Rock You" by Queen, with a vocal track made up of remixed clips of George H. W. Bush, who made announcements about the Gulf War.

=== Track listing ===
1. Psychoactive Drugs
2. Get Down, Get Down
3. Station Identification
4. Don't Back Down
5. I Will Teach You
6. Behavior Modification / We Will Rock You
7. I Am A Man
8. Lawrence Welk Is Dead
9. Watch Television
10. Syncopated Ordinance Demonstration #1
11. Operational Report

== Telecommunication Breakdown ==
The album Telecommunication Breakdown, released in 1995, was one of the first Enhanced CDs ever produced, and contained contributions from Bill Laswell, Institute of Technology, Grandmaster Melle Mel, Brian Eno, and Jack Dangers. Among the videos released are "Get Down" and "Electronic Behavior Control System", which mocks the way television controls our lives. The band used a video/audio sample of R. Budd Dwyer's suicide in "Get Down". Wired.com described the band's use of samples on "Get Down" as "the video equivalent of Public Enemy's Bomb Squad".

== Style ==
Josh Pearson, EBN's charismatic front man and principal performance artist, was also EBN's music composer and main video editor. He says that the band are not musicians but use sampling technology to create multimedia performance art.

The EBN modus operandi was to take cable television broadcasts and remix them with a funky beat, often having the lyrics "sung" not by a singer but by half-second sound clips from TV, spliced together. For example, the lyric "electronic behavior control system" would be created with a clip of Ross Perot saying "electronic", followed by a clip of George H. W. Bush saying "behavior", then Ted Koppel saying "control", and finally a clip of Bill Clinton saying "system". This technique has been named video scratching.

== Legacy ==
Though recognizing a long tradition before EBN, author and academic Holly Willis traces modern VJing to them.

Following his departure from EBN, Kane co-developed video sampling software Vujak. Kane has since worked a number of times with British AV artists Addictive TV on many of their projects, both live and recorded, including Mixmasters and at London's Institute of Contemporary Arts.

Deocampo founded Company of Science and Art, which developed After Effects. He continues his video remixes independently today, using footage from the 2003 invasion of Iraq (which he refers to as Gulf War II). In 2006, Deocampo started working with a trio of London video turntablists, Eclectic Method: Jonny Wilson, Ian Edgar, and Geoff Gamlen.

Joshua Pearson is Senior Editor at Outpost Digital / RadicalMedia, and has edited numerous commercials, television shows, and documentary films, including Under African Skies: Paul Simon's Graceland Journey, and Whitey: The United States V James J. Bulger, both of which were Sundance selections. In 2015, he edited What Happened, Miss Simone?, directed by Liz Garbus, which was nominated for an Oscar for Best Documentary Feature and won an Emmy for Outstanding Documentary.

Gardner Post has continued to work in sculpture and audiovisual performance, including the band United Content Providers.
