= Modul8 =

- Developer(s): GarageCube
- Stable release: 2.7.2 / January 13, 2014; 11 years ago
- Operating system: OS X
- Type: live visual performance
- License: Proprietary
- Website: modul8.ch

Modul8 is a software for live visual performance developed by GarageCube, a company established in 2005 by Yves Schmid and Boris Edelstein, based in Geneva, Switzerland. Modul8 was started with the intention of providing a tool for VJing in openGL.

== History ==
The first public release was in 2004, followed by version 2 in 2005.

== Features ==
While the first version was a stripped down real-time compositing environment, the second version introduced a module system, allowing customization of the software interface. Modul8 also offers support for multiple screen output on the MacPro. The application also has an integrated programming environment that allows to write Python scripts inside the application.

== See also ==
- Mapping Festival
