= VJ Hypnotica =

Canadian VJ

“VJ Hypnotica” (Russell Vaz)
- Also known as: Dr. VJ Hypnotica, Dr. Hypnotica, Hypnotica, Dr. Rave
- Born: December 10, 1971 (age 53); Montreal, Quebec, Canada
- Origin: Montreal, Quebec, Canada
- Genres: B-movie, scratch, synesthesia, psychedelic, geometric
- Years active: 1995 – 2024
- Members: Russell "VJ Hypnotica" Vaz
- Website: www.VJHypnotica.com

Russell Vaz is a Canadian VJ commonly known by his stage name, VJ Hypnotica. One of the originators of VJing in Canada in 1995, VJ Hypnotica's style has evolved markedly from its early beginnings, consisting more of scratching, B-movie, and synthetic synesthesia than psychedelic and geometric.

== Biography ==
=== Beginnings ===
Vaz was born and raised in Montreal, QC, where he spent much of his youth playing the guitar, listening to mostly classic hip-hop, new wave, and industrial, and watching B-movies and current Hollywood films. Vaz was also influenced by the local punk scene and the music of touring American and Canadian bands that would play at show bars, such as Les Foufounes Electriques (translated from French: The Electric Pussycat), including Ripcordz and Nirvana. He was exposed to music by audio sample-playback artists like Beastie Boys, Ministry, Public Image Limited, Depeche Mode, and Nitzer Ebb. Vaz later frequented a local underground house record store called Inbeat Records, where he became acquainted with the sounds of dance music genres like trance, house, techno, acid, and tribal.

=== Analog VJing performances, 1995-1998 ===
He gained experience in the Mars Bar nightclub as the lighting designer and light board operator for a short time before founding Hypnotica Visuals in 1995.

The first few years of VJ work saw Hypnotica performing live VJing for many underground raves, installing heavy analog slide and video projectors, and remixing video live from tape, laser disc, live cameras, and video special effects units. He also operated the Technodrome website (the rave community's event calendar on the internet), was recognized and respected by the promoters, artists, and venues in the scene, acted as the authoritative mediator in disputes that inevitably broke out, and ran the Smart Info Booth kiosk at events which gave out health and safety information leaflets on the effects of popular party drugs in the scene.

1997 saw VJ Hypnotica serve as an original advising consultant and beta tester to ArKaos for their first VJing software X<>pose and was one of its first users when it was released the following year, 1998.

=== Digital/Analog VJing, 1998-Today ===
Since the release of the first VJing software in 1998 by ArKaos, VJ Hypnotica has performed live laptop video remixes with digital video clips and analog video capture sources.

In 2002, VJ Hypnotica's uncredited work producing the visuals that were projected on the giant screen behind the live performance recorded for the French-Canadian singer Garou's 2002 DVD release, with the participation of Celine Dion and Luc Plamondon produced by Sony Music Entertainment and BMG, helped this DVD receive a professional review score of 17 out of 20 points: the “Image” section of the DVD review, which covers the quality of the projected visuals as part of the emotional impact of the live performance, received 5 out of 5 points. The reviewer concluded, translated from French, “For those who haven't caught on yet, this DVD is a bomb that you must explode in your living room.”

=== Performance Highlights ===
From the first live performance of VJing at the rave WaveLength on March 4, 1995, to September 2010, VJ Hypnotica has performed live to more than one million people in 22 cities and eight countries, at 1322 live events and counting.

=== Honors ===
- Named to the Elle Quebec list of the nine most notable people and organizations working in the underground rave scene of 1997.
- Named to the Montreal Mirror Nightlife 99: Most Influential People and Places of the Decade.
