= Moist Music =

American dance music record label, from 2007

Moist Music is a New York City based electronic dance music record label that is a subsidiary of Phase One Communications. Victor Ortiz, aka Vicious Vic established Moist Music in 2004. Victor was previously part of the founding crew members of the early Caffeine movement in New York City, alongside his early production partner DJ Micro from the duo Progression. Moist Music produces independent CDs and albums in major retail, as well as simultaneous digital releases for all new albums. Beginning in fall 2007, Moist began to release all albums through the back catalog digitally. An incomplete list of artists is provided below.

== Artists and former artists ==
- John 00 Fleming
- Marco V
- DJ Irene
- Reid Speed
- Johan Gielen
- Donald Glaude
- Markus Schulz
- D:Fuse
- DJ Micro
- George Acosta
- Meat Katie
- Stonebridge
- Filo & Peri
- Freaky Flow
- DJ Icey
- DJ Baby Anne
- Aphrodite
- AK1200
- Dave Seaman

== See also ==
- List of record labels
