= Law of the jungle (disambiguation) =

Law of the jungle is usually an expression that can mean "every man for himself," "anything goes," "might makes right," "survival of the strongest", etc.

Law of the Jungle may also refer to:

- Law of the Jungle (1942 film), an American film directed by Jean Yarbrough
- Law of the Jungle (1995 film), also known as Jungle Law and Street Law, a Canadian film starring Jeff Wincott
- Law of the Jungle, a Hardy Boys novel
- Law of the Jungle (album), a 1994 oldskool jungle compilation album
- Law of the Jungle (TV program), South Korean reality-documentary television show
