= Showkontrol =

Showkontrol / TC Supply company logo

Showkontrol running on a laptop during Ultra Music Festival 2023

Showkontrol is a platform for use in synchronizing lighting, video, laser, and effects during live music events. It is used in clubs, festivals, broadcast productions, and touring shows worldwide. The system provides a bridge between artist performance and live event-production systems.

The software is a DJ-timecode tool. Originally based on ProDJ TAP, an early system that enabled technicians to monitor a DJ's playback data in real time for show-control purposes. It allows for automating and synchronizing elements of live productions.

The software is made by the Dutch-American company TC Supply (established in 2004). The company became part of Event Imagineering Group (EiG) in 2016, with EiG in the United States serving as the distributor for TC Supply's products.

TC Supply evolved its early timecode tools into a full show control ecosystem, ultimately leading to the creation of ShowKontrol - a platform that is designed to receive real-time metadata, BPM, waveforms, and performance information from Pioneer DJ's PRO DJ LINK network for integration with lighting, video, laser, and FX systems.

In 2017 TC Supply and Pioneer DJ (now AlphaTheta), entered a partnership. For ShowKontrol, a new protocol called TCNet was designed, in order to enable reliable communication between the DJ equipment and show control devices. TCNet is now widely adopted by media server and lighting companies such as Avolites, Arkaos, Chamsys, Resolume, and Disguise.
