= Happy 2b Hardcore =

Compilation album (DJ mix album) by Anabolic Frolic
- Released: 21 January 1997
- Genre: Happy hardcore; breakbeat techno
- Length: 66:12
- Label: Moonshine Music
- Producer: Various

Anabolic Frolic chronology
Happy 2b Hardcore (1997)	Happy 2b Hardcore: Chapter Two (1997)

Happy 2b Hardcore is a DJ mix album by Canadian DJ Anabolic Frolic. It was released in 1997 on American breakbeat label Moonshine Music and is the first series in Frolic's Happy 2b Hardcore series of DJ mix albums, documenting the emergence of happy hardcore music in the United Kingdom and Europe. The series itself is a spin-off of Moonshine's Speed Limit 140 BPM+ series of fast-tempo dance music compilations. The album was conceived to introduce American audiences to happy hardcore, and contains sixteen of the genre's anthems which carry many of happy hardcore's defining characteristics, such as fast tempo, frantic breakbeats, major key tonality, off-kilter, quirky keyboard effects and "semi-melodies."

Moonshine had modest anticipations for the album and their numerous promotional campaigns involved arranging for Frolic to promote the album on radio, a "whirlwind" of attention which took Frolic by surprise. The album was a surprise success, selling over 100,000 copies, a remarkable amount for a compilation of underground music. It is credited with helping increase the genre's spread in the United States and for inspiring Frolic's Hullabaloo happy hardcore rave in 1997, the first of its kind in the United States. Critics welcomed the album as a great introduction to happy hardcore, and Ned Raggett later named it the 102nd best album of the 1990s.

== Background ==
Happy hardcore emerged largely in the United Kingdom in the mid-1990s, characterised by a very fast tempo (usually around 160–180 BPM), often matched with solo vocals and sentimental lyrics, and also by a generally major key tone, 4/4 beat "happy" sound distinguishes it from most other forms of hardcore, which tend to be "darker". Initially, the genre was often additionally characterized by piano riffs, spacey sounds and synthetic stabs. In the UK, the long-running Bonkers series of happy hardcore DJ mix albums was the most popular happy hardcore compilation series, beginning in 1996 with an inaugural edition mixed by Hixxy and DJ Sharkey.

American dance label Moonshine Music, known for importing electronic music from the UK and releasing it in the United States for the first time, conceived Happy 2b Hardcore in 1996 as a means to introduce American audiences to the genre. The label's repertoire at that point consisted of rave music and UK hardcore genres, including jungle music, drum and bass and breakbeat techno; however, they had not released any happy hardcore music. They contacted Canadian happy hardcore enthusiast and disc jockey Anabolic Frolic, who had sent them an unsolicited demo, to compile and mix the album. Due to the music's fast tempo, Happy 2b Hardcore was released as a spin-off to the label's long-running breakbeat hardcore series of compilations, Speed Limit 140 BPM+.

== Music ==
Happy 2b Hardcore's liner notes describe the album as containing sixteen "happy hardcore hardcore techno anthems" mixed together by Frolic, the songs themselves recorded by "a bunch of UK and maybe European acts." Jason Birchmeier of AllMusic described the music as containing "ultra-fast bpms, accompanied by more than enough synth melodies to hum along to -- or blow your rave whistle to," while music critic Ned Raggett described the music on the album as being "as fast as gabber without being at all macho; the jungle breaks are ripping along, but even more hyperspeed hollow, with the songs carried as much by the bizarro keyboard squelches and quick bursts of semi-melody before everything suddenly speeds up all over again, and again and yet again. And then stops and starts and continues as it should and could and must always, while shreds of lyrics pop in and out and around and back again, as purely resistant of the dire lit crit model of music writing as any straight instrumental."

John Bush of AllMusic, acknowledging the album's usage of "anthems," noted the album's inclusion of "classics" such as Eruption's "Let the Music", DJ Codeine & Unknown's "Feel the Power" and DNA's "Go Insane." Specific points in the album noted by journalists include the introductory melody line from "Take On Me" by a-ha making a sudden appearance in the introduction of "I Believe" by DJ Stompy, the unnamed singer on "Here I Am" by DJ Ham, DJ Demo and Justin Time "suddenly [taking] off with the title line and the immediacy of the sheer moment of it all just brings it all home -- while Chuck D yelping "Ah yeah, now that's progress" is reduced to a mere sped-up blip stuck in at the weirdest points, the tyranny of lyrical meaning implicitly quashed in the rush."

== Release and promotion ==
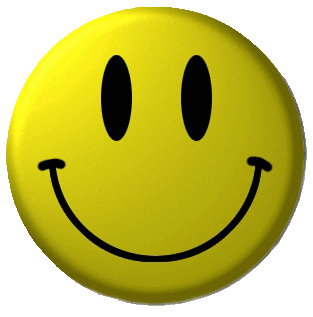
The yellow smiley is a symbol of rave music in the United Kingdom.

Frolic described Moonshine Music's hopes for Happy 2B Hardcore as "modest," seeing as the album was planned to be a standalone release. Moonshine promoted the album with posters and magazine advertisements and arranged for Frolic to appear on numerous radio stations, be interviewed by the media, and photographed by a publicist. "I was now plugged into their promotional machine," he recalled. "My friend George turned to me and said 'I'll always remember you, Chris'." The work he was asked to take to promote the album took Frolic by surprise: "Up until this point I was just a small DJ, playing small local raves, but certainly not on the level of doing international appearances and promotion. So it definitely felt like a whirlwind ride." An official launch party for the album was held in Los Angeles, where Frolic played a rave he had promoted beforehand on the city's popular dance station Groove Radio. During his appearance on Groove Radio, he also played a live DJ mix in the studio.

Moonshine Music released Happy 2b Hardcore on 21 January 1997 in the United States. The usage of yellow smileys on the record's album cover, described by Raggett as "nice big smiley faces […] floating above a bunch of speaker cones," highlight the rave aspect to the music, as the yellow smiley symbol had been used in the United Kingdom since the acid house era to represent rave music. Anabolic Frolic recalled the album's striking album cover made it stand out in the "electronica" section of American record stores: "It’s no surprise it was an immediate hit." Many customers purchased the album on a whim, and wrote to Frolic afterwards; in 2017, Frolic rhapsodised that it's "hard to think back to those days before MP3s and internet streaming, that often you just bought CDs in the store trying your luck and hoping you liked it."

== Reception and legacy ==
Professional ratings
Review scores
Source	Rating
AllMusic	4.5/5 stars

Upon its release, Happy 2b Hardcore was a surprise success, selling over 100,000 copies, which Frolic noted "which was an incredible number for obscure music." He later said the album's success "emboldened" him: "I knew the audience was out there, but rave promoters at the time didn’t know how to book it inside their events." As such, it inspired him to birth the successful Hullabaloo raves in June 1997 in order to cater for happy hardcore's American audience. Also as a result of the album's success, Moonshine and Frolic later released multiple sequels to the album, turning it into the first of a series; the first sequel, the similarly acclaimed Happy 2b Hardcore: Chapter Two, was released 9 September 1997. The series became a best-selling series.

"To me this just sounds like the logical end conclusion of a sound, from arty fringe to mainstream, but the difference is that this particular mainstream sounds like it would still piss off everyone else. It's giddy, crazed, insane, wonderful, and therefore brilliant."

—Ned Raggett (1999)

Happy 2b Hardcore was also released to critical acclaim. John Bush of AllMusic rated the album four and a half stars out of five and said it is "the best place for happy hardcore novices to begin as well as a great mix (by Slipmatt) for fans who already have most of the material." He concluded that, "along with several volumes in the Now We're Totally Bonkers series, the collection is one of the best documents in happy hardcore's immense catalog." In 2002, Billboard noted the album's release was a significant moment in the history of Moonshine, "documenting the underground sound of happy hardcore." The album, along with other instalments in the series, later influenced happy hardcore producer one nut Chaos D.

In 1999, Ned Raggett of Freaky Trigger ranked the album at number 102 in his list of "The Top 136 or So Albums of the 90s". He described it as a "perfectly sequenced and mixed compilation" and Frolic as "[blending] everything together just right": "it's not merely a great mix disc, it's just so goddamn fun and nuts that I can't understand why anyone would actually hate it, while realizing at the same why loads of people couldn't stand it." He described the music as sounding "like it's mutating and growing and changing as you listen to it, and is so wonderful for it."

== Track listing ==
1. Eruption – "Reach Out" – 2:27
2. JDS – "Higher Love" (Slipmatt Remix) – 5:50
3. DJ DNA – "Go Insane (Future Primitive Remix)" – 4:20
4. DJ Codeine & Unknown – "Feel the Power" – 4:24
5. Seduction & Dougal – "It's Not Over (Remix)" – 3:44
6. DJ Hixxy & Bananaman – "Forever" – 4:10
7. DJ Ham, DJ Demo & Justin Time – "Here I Am" – 4:08
8. Eruption – "Surrender" (Force & Styles Remix) – 5:04
9. DJ Ham – "Here We Go Again" – 3:46
10. DJ Stompy – "I Believe" – 3:09
11. Force & Styles – "Heart of Gold" – 4:12
12. DJ Demo – "Muzik" – 4:01
13. DJ Stompy – "Dawn of a New Era" – 4:34
14. Eruption – "Let the Music" (Brisk Remix) – 4:44
15. Scott Brown vs. DJ Rab-S – "Now is the Time" (Hixxy & Trixxy Remix) – 3:08
16. Hixxy – "Wanting to Get High" (Smoogies Awake) – 4:24

== See also ==
- Happy hardcore
