= Bad Baby =

Bad Baby may refer to:

- Bad Baby, a 2012 album by DJ Baby Anne
- Bad Baby, a 2017 album by Sarah Jaffe

== See also ==
- Bhad Bhabie (born 2003), American rapper
