= Mxwendler =

Software system created by the German company device+context

MXWendler is a software system created by the German company device+context.

The software is intended to create live visuals, commonly used in clubs, music festivals, theatres, facade projections and arts events.

The software renders live video using common graphics hardware instead of using the CPU. The company's website claims this makes the software 'very fast'. Another aspect is the "generative aspect"' of the software: it has a built-in feedback loop which allows it to generate new videostreams by using the feedback characteristics as proposed by VJs like mxzehn instead of solely relying on triggered prepared footage clips.

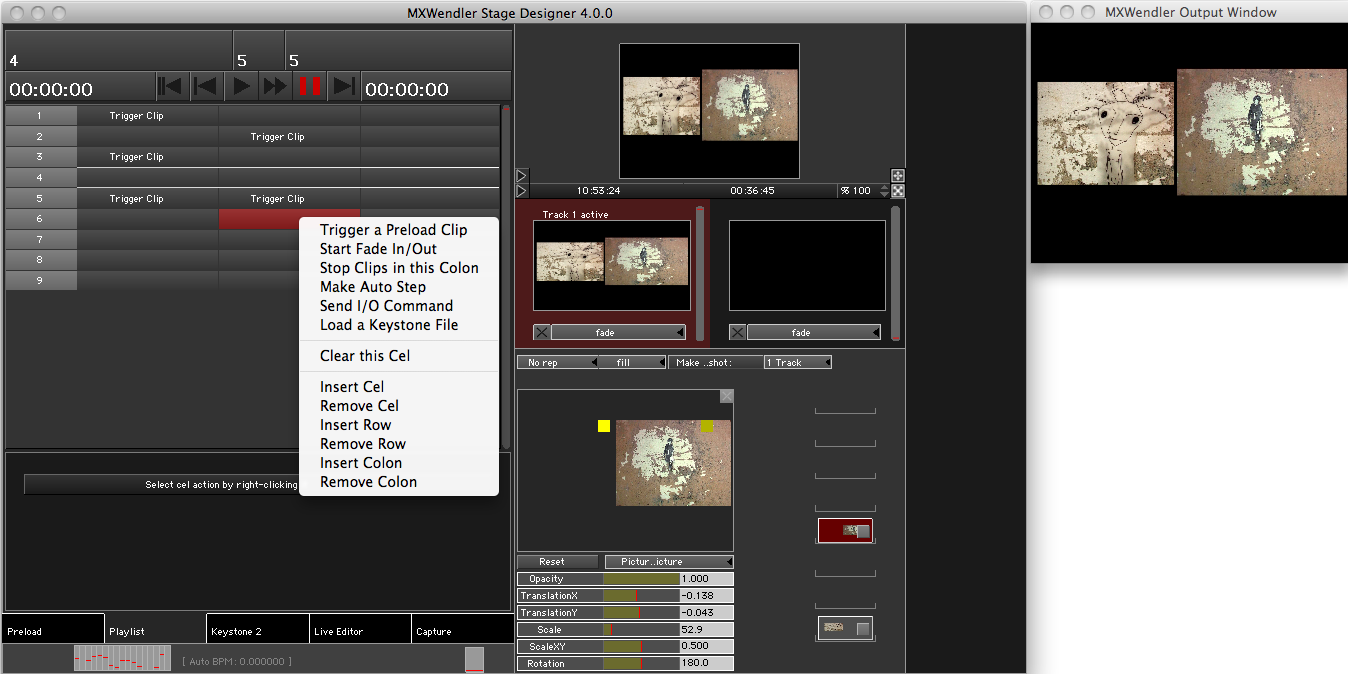

== See also ==
- Video performance artist
