= Magic Music Visuals =

Music visualizer and VJ software application

- Operating system: Windows, macOS
- Type: Music visualizer, VJing
- License: Proprietary
- Website: magicmusicvisuals.com

Magic Music Visuals is a music visualizer and VJ software application for Windows and macOS.

== Features ==
Magic can be used to create live visuals for music performances, or to create music videos for recorded songs.

It has a modular interface which allows for the manipulation of many different types of media, such as images, 3D models, video files, live video capture, GLSL shaders, and generative geometric graphics. Nearly all editable parameters can be driven by multi-channel audio or MIDI input.

== History ==
Magic was first released in 2012.
