= Balado =

Balado may refer to:

- Balado (food), a spicy Minang dish of Indonesia
- Balado, Kinross, a former military airfield near Kinross, in central Scotland
- Balado railway station, a station closed when it was still Kinross-shire
- Roberto Balado, Cuban heavyweight boxer
