= Company of Science and Art =

American software company

- Industry: Computer software
- Founded: 1990
- Founders: Greg Deocampo; David Foster; David Herbstman; David Simons
- Defunct: 1993
- Fate: Acquired by Aldus Corporation
- Successors: Aldus Corporation; Adobe Inc.
- Headquarters: Providence, Rhode Island, U.S.
- Website: cosa.com

Company of Science and Art (CoSA) was a small software company headquartered in Providence, Rhode Island. It was founded in 1990 by Greg Deocampo (also a member of the video art collective Emergency Broadcast Network), David Foster, David Herbstman, and David Simons. William J. O'Farrell became its CEO in 1990. It operated for slightly less than three years.

However, during its brief existence, CoSA created the category-defining After Effects desktop animation and compositing program, releasing version 1.0 in 1992. In 1993, CoSA was acquired by the Aldus Corporation; Aldus was in turn acquired by Adobe in 1994. The name is currently used by an unrelated visual effects company, CoSA VFX.

Before After Effects, in 1991, CoSA published PACo—one of the first cross-platform streaming digital video applications.
