= Freaky Flow =

American musician (born 1977)

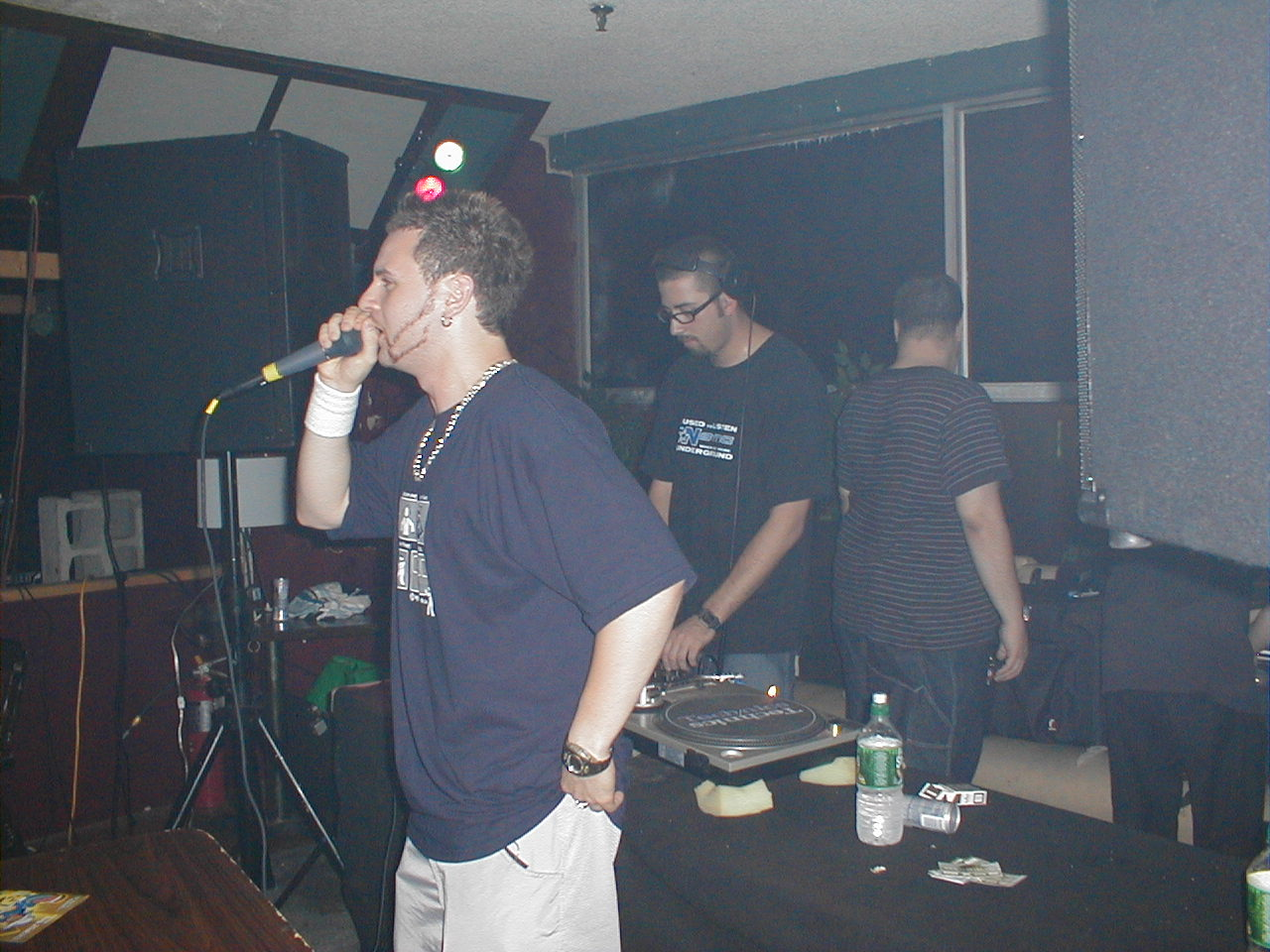
Freaky Flow with MC Flipside at a rave in Springfield, Massachusetts, in 2004.

Stephen Grey (born 1977), known by the stage-name Freaky Flow, is an American drum and bass and hip hop DJ.

== Early life ==
Grey was born in Philadelphia, Pennsylvania, in 1977. In 1979, his family relocated to Toronto, Canada. While attending high school, he began to DJ as a hobby, which eventually developed into a career while he was studying for a Bachelor of Arts degree at the University of Toronto. In 2009, he moved to Los Angeles. He has dual citizenship in the United States and Canada.

== Career ==
Grey began DJing at house parties and small events in Toronto in 1993. In 1995, he played at the first Liquid Adrenaline event in Toronto, and also released his first DJ mix tape, entitled Music To Make You Freak – Volume 1. He subsequently released seven further mixes on audio cassette, before releasing his first CD in 1999.

In 1997, Grey launched Placebo Recordings (a subsidiary of Stickman Records), with MC Flipside and The Stickmen. The label produced three vinyl records. In 1999, Grey released his first DJ mix CD, Obscene Underground – Volume 1: Freaky Flow, which sold over 20,000 units in Canada, but was not widely released elsewhere.

In 2001, Grey signed to Moonshine Music. In the same year, he released his first mix CD outside of Canada, entitled World Domination. In 2002, he released another album on Moonshine Music, entitled Keep It Live, his first commercially released live recording. The album is hosted by MC Flipside, and was recorded at an event in Toronto. In 2003, Grey released the album The Envy, on New York label Topaz Records. In 2004, Grey independently released another mix CD, Flashback, featuring exclusively songs that he had written, co-written, or remixed since the start of his career.

In 2006, Grey launched a new record label, Freaky Flow Recordings. Later that year, the label released the debut album by the Canadian electronic music group, The Heavy Petters (sometimes billed as Freaky Flow Presents: The Heavy Petters). The album, executive produced by Grey, was entitled Smell The Glove.

In 2009, Grey released the mix album The Furious Factor on New York's Moist Music, a joint-venture with Toronto-based drum and bass label Furious Records. The album was a retrospective mix compilation of notable releases on Furious Records. In 2011, he continued his Volume mix series with two new mixes, Volume 009 and Volume 010, both given away free online.

Having released six mix CDs in total, Grey has sold more drum and bass mix albums than any other Canadian DJ, and more mix albums in Canada than any DJ. He is represented by the booking agency Cyber Groove.

== Discography ==
=== Albums ===
- Obscene Underground – Volume 1: Freaky Flow – Stickman Records (1999)
- World Domination – Moonshine Music (2001)
- Keep It Live – Moonshine Music (2002)
- The Envy – Topaz Records (2003)
- Flashback – Freaky Flow Productions (2004)
- The Furious Factor – Moist Music (2009)

=== Singles ===
- On The Down Low / Mist – Placebo Recordings (1997)
- The Swinger / Here We Go – Wikkid Records (2005)

=== Remixes ===
- What It Takes (Remix) / Just A Second (Remix) – Placebo Recordings (1997)
- Compare / Compare (Remix) – Second Generation (2001)
- Doubt Love / Doubt Love (Remix) – Sound Gizmo Audio (2003)
