= Moonshine Music =

American electronic music record label

Moonshine Music was an electronic music record label founded by Steve Levy and Ricardo Vinas, in Los Angeles in 1992, and later headquartered in West Hollywood, California. Moonshine released over 250 compilations albums, many of which were DJ mixed. Moonshine helped to launch the career of DJ Keoki produced by Grammy Winning producer Dave Audé (who was one of the first bands signed to Moonshine with his and Levy's band Lunatic Fringe). By publishing the work of British audiovisual artists Addictive TV, Moonshine became one of the first US dance labels to release a DVD.

Among Moonshine's other artists include Kellee, D:Fuse, DJ Micro, AK1200, DJ Baby Anne, DJ Dara, DJ John Kelley, Dieselboy, Freaky Flow, Cirrus, Anabolic Frolic, Ferry Corsten, DJ Feelgood, Christopher Lawrence, Tall Paul, & DJ Dan.

In 2000, Donald Glaude recorded a live set at Washington, DC's club night Buzz that was released as "Mixed Live: Buzz @ Nation" on Moonshine Music on June 26, 2001.

== See also ==
- Happy 2b Hardcore (1997)
- Law of the Jungle (1994)
- List of electronic music record labels
