= D Fuse =

American record producer (1969 or 1970 – 2025)

D:Fuse
- Born: Dustin Fuselier; 1969 or 1970; Austin, Texas, U.S.
- Died: February 22, 2025
- Genres: House; progressive house; electronica
- Occupations: DJ; producer; remixer; drummer; percussionist
- Years active: 1996–2025
- Labels: Perfecto Records, Virgin, System Recordings, 3Beat Records, Moonshine Music, Moist Music, Psychobaby Records, Skyline Records, Lost Angeles Recordings, Curvve Recordings

Dustin Fuselier (1969 or 1970 – February 22, 2025), better known by the stage name D:Fuse, was an American record producer, remixer and DJ. He released albums including People_2: Both Sides of the Picture and Begin.

== Background ==
D:Fuse was born in Austin, Texas, in either 1969 or 1970, and resided in Oakland, California. He died on February 22, 2025.

== Career ==
D:Fuse started his music career in Austin, Texas, writing and performing industrial music under the name Culture Industry. He transitioned from being a drummer and singer to DJing. In 1998, he partnered with Shane Howard to form Expansion. They self-released their first two tracks on vinyl and promoted their work at that year's Winter Music Conference. Soon after, the singles "Feel" and "Listen" gained popularity with DJs like Timo Maas, Sasha, John Digweed, Chris Fortier, Danny Howells, and others. "Feel" was also chosen by Dave Seaman for his Global Underground 012: Buenos Aires compilation.

In 1998, D:Fuse signed with the electronic music label Moonshine Records, where he released three mix compilations, selling over 120,000 CDs and singles. This included his first solo club hit, "Body Shock".

In 2001, Paul Oakenfold noticed D:Fuse. He joined Oakenfold on two consecutive North American Perfecto tours, playing over 50 sold-out shows, as well as appearances in England, Scotland, Switzerland, Ibiza, Canada and Mexico. Following this, he created a double CD mix compilation for Oakenfold's Perfecto Presents... series (in collaboration with V2 Records in the USA). Subsequently, Perfecto released "She Rides" by D:Fuse & Joy in 2001. This track was featured on several Perfecto compilations, as well as the Gatecrasher mix series, and reached number 85 in the UK singles chart. His album People was released in February 2002 and entered the CMJ Chart at number 9.

D:Fuse released People_2: Both Sides Of The Picture, a 2xCD mix for System Recordings, in 2003. Featuring eight new productions, this compilation became one of his most successful works. He was featured on the cover of both Remix and Urb magazines and performed at the Coachella Festival that year.

In 2004, D:Fuse was voted Urb's #2 Winter Music Conference DJ. His solo debut album, Begin, was released on System Recordings and received positive feedback.

In 2005, D:Fuse launched 'The D:Fuse Live Experience,' a performance that combined live percussion with traditional DJing. The setup included D:Fuse on percussion, Mike Hiratzka on guitar, bass, keyboards, and vocals, and MC Flint on additional vocals. This concept was accompanied by the release of People_3, a live recording from performances in San Francisco and Austin. The CD received positive reviews in Remix and M3 magazines.

In 2006, D:Fuse's live show concept led to a collaboration with The Scumfrog to create their project "DJs Are Alive", with DJ Skribble, Kristine W and Static Revenger.

In 2007, D:Fuse released the retrospective album Thanks for Listening (The Club Singles ‘98-’08 re:mixed + re:mastered), which included reworked, remixed, and remastered versions of his tracks into a twelve-song collection featuring "She Rides", "Everything With You", "Living the Dream", and a collaboration with The Scumfrog titled "Stereo & Video". Sean-Michael Yoder of Alarm magazine gave the album a negative review, stating that although D:Fuse and Hiratzka have produced talented releases in the past, the album sounds dated with "laughable" melodies.

D:Fuse hosted "The People's Mix" show on XM. In 2009, D:Fuse and Mike Hiratzka completed the mix album series titled Clubbing in Lost Angeles, which featured eleven tracks from the Lost Angeles Recordings catalogue. It combined club tracks like "Massif", "Perfection", and "Everything With You" with new productions including "Tobias" and D&H remixes of Govinda's "Can't Forget The Day" and Nosmo & Kris B's "One For The Road".

At the time of his death, he had released nine albums. His last record, ‘reconstructing midnight’, landed in late 2024, and was described by Fuselier as a “project of love, sweat, tears and joy”.

== Discography ==
=== Albums ===
- 2001: Progressive Mix Session 1.0
- 2002: People
- 2003: People_2: Both Sides of the Picture
- 2004: Begin
- 2005: People_3: Both Sides of the Picture (Live)
- 2007: Skyline Lounge
- 2009: Human Frequency
- 2011: Human Frequency 2.0
- 2024: Reconstructing Midnight
- 2025: Echoes of DFUSE: Collaborated album with Johnny Kaotic ( Jon Gordon )

=== Singles ===
- 2001: Bodyshock (Moonshine)
- 2003: D:Fuse feat. Jes "Everything With You" (3 Beats)
- 2005: D:Fuse feat. Jes "Living the Dream" (Skyline Records)
- 2006: D:Fuse feat. Pete Lorimer "Other Side" (System)
- 2008: D:Fuse & Hiratzka "Breathe In" (Curvve Recordings)
- 2015: D:Fuse feat. Dub Mechanics "This is You Alive" (Revv Shop)
- 2025: D:Fuse feat. Johnny Kaotic "Better Days Ahead" (Synergetic Rekords)
- 2025: D:Fuse feat. Johnny Kaotic "RainLight 'Dancing in the rain'" (Synergetic Rekords)

=== Remixes ===
- 2008: Bill Hamel "Perspectives" (D:Fuse & Howard remix) [Lost Angeles]
- 2011: Tall Sasha "In My Heart" (D:Fuse Remix) [Curvve Recordings]
- 2011: Vinny Troia feat. Jaidene Veda "Do For Love" (D:Fuse & Hiratzka remix) [Curvve Recordings]
