= Mixmasters =

Mixmasters was a late-night music show, and later a DVD series, of audio-visual and DJ:VJ mixes produced by AV artists Addictive TV. The series ran from 2000 to 2005 and aired in the United Kingdom on ITV. It has since been screened in a number of countries worldwide. The show consisted of 2 short ten-minute DJ sets from independent record labels mixed with innovative visuals, motion graphics and animations by VJs, often with trippy results to psychedelic effect.

The entire Mixmasters project featured nearly 400 artists worldwide, including DJs like Miss Kittin, Ellen Allien, Matthew Dear, Derrick Carter, DJ Spooky, Plump DJs, DMX Krew, Slam and many others including Addictive TV themselves. International labels included the likes of BPitch Control, Soma, Kompakt, Ninja Tune, Ghostly International, Sublime and many others.

It was the first series to put VJs onto broadcast television. LA based label Moonshine Music released five DVDs from the Mixmasters series.

The success of the show resulted in the project's producers, Addictive TV, creating the visual music festival Optronica, a high-profile international event focussing on AV artists and the VJ arts, organised with the British Film Institute.
