= Orchestra of Samples =

Orchestra of Samples is a film and audio project by audio/video artists and producers Addictive TV. It's a unique endeavor breaking down cultural and musical barriers based on sampling recording sessions with over 200 musicians around the world while travelling in South America, Asia, the Middle-East, North & West Africa and across Europe. Since 2010, the artists filmed the improvised sessions with musicians playing all manner of instruments from localized traditional to contemporary and newly invented, sampling and splicing them to create new music. In 2017 it was released as an album on German label Studio !K7.

== History ==
An early version of Orchestra of Samples premiered in London at Watermans Arts Centre in November 2013. It received positive reviews, including from The Times journalist John Bungey who called it "ingenious and compelling". According to Huffington Post, the artists "create the perfect integration of audio and visual technologies in their thrilling live show... musicians from around the world in their John Lomax-esque Orchestra of Samples project, they cut and splice different media into one cohesive vision." A review on arts website Cultured Vultures called it "a glimpse into the very essence of music" and in 2017 Songlines magazine described the project as "most impressive".

Performances have included Russia's Erarta Museum of Contemporary Arts in St. Petersburg, the French cultural institute Musee du quai Branly in Paris, Centro Nacional de las Artes (México) in Mexico City for the Transitio Festival and the Museum of Contemporary Art of Rome for the prestigious Romaeuropa Festival. In 2016 they performed the project at the famous Círculo de Bellas Artes in Madrid, Spain and the Royal College of Art in London. In 2017, supporting the release of the project's album on German label Studio !K7, Addictive TV toured the UK, dates included WOMAD World of Music, Arts and Dance, Shambala Festival and BBC Music Day in Sheffield. Other performances include Celtic Connections in Glasgow and in 2020 at the Centre Pompidou in Paris.

Of the 200 and more musicians Addictive TV recorded for Orchestra of Samples, notable artists they collaborated with on the project include Dame Evelyn Glennie, Laetitia Sadier of British group Stereolab, Kuljit Bhamra MBE, Motorhead drummer Lucas Fox, Latin Grammy Award winner Mazinho Quevedo, Henry Dagg, BBC Radio Scotland Young Traditional Musician Shona Mooney, Senegalise hip-hop artist Matador, French rappers Edgar Sekloka and Gael Faye a.k.a. Milk Coffee and Sugar and producer Chris Birkett.

During live performances of the project, artists who have guested on stage with the group include Dame Evelyn Glennie, Dennis Rollins MBE, Baluji Shrivastav, Byron Wallen, Stomp's Paul Gunter and members of Spanish band Txarango.
