= Anabolic Frolic =

Happy hardcore DJ from Canada

- Also known as: Chris Frolic
- Born: Chris Samojlenko; 1974 (age 51–52); Ottawa, Ontario, Canada
- Genre: Happy hardcore
- Occupation: DJ
- Years active: 1996–2008
- Website: www.anabolic-frolic.com

Chris Samojlenko, better known as Anabolic Frolic and Chris Frolic, is a happy hardcore DJ from Canada who is known for the Happy 2b Hardcore CD series and the Hullabaloo! promotion he threw in Toronto, Ontario.

== Biography ==
Samojlenko was born in Ottawa, Ontario, Canada in 1974 and was raised by his grandmother. He first started being interested in Happy Hardcore upon listening to a randomly chosen UK import mixed tape at the now defunct rave shop X-static in 1995. He taught himself to DJ on a pair of used turntables bought from a pawnshop for $100. It was the only way he could listen to the music he loved in Toronto (or anywhere in North America then), mainly because he didn't go to raves at the time. Frolic began importing and re-selling Happy Hardcore vinyl from the UK.

At age 21, Samojlenko became interested in it as a lifestyle. He started Nokturnal Records out of his bedroom, importing and selling vinyl records online. In 1996, he moved into a small, windowless office, sleeping on the floor for the next two years while trying to make a go of his DJ career and his events production company, Hullabaloo!.

He was signed by Steve Levy, a co-owner of the international music label Moonshine Records, after sending them an unsolicited mixed tape and, according to his own website, a faked magazine article he had a friend write for him.

The first Happy 2b Hardcore release in 1997 sold 100,000 copies. Chris also met Robin Grainer that year—a fan from Southern California who would become his wife.

In 2000, Samojlenko was banned from ever entering the United States due to visa violations, but this ban was lifted after a period of three years. To add to his legal problems, his American fiancée at the time also did not have status in Canada. Despite these professional and personal uncertainties, however, Samojlenko put out Happy2bHardcore Chapters Four and Five, producing two of the latter's tracks and continuing to organise his Hullabaloo events.

Currently, there are eight Happy 2b Hardcore albums by Anabolic Frolic released, and he co-hosted an online radio show called HappyHourRadio with his "DJ crony" Silver1. HappyHourRadio ceased late 2004/early 2005 and the last Hullabaloo! event was held on July 14, 2007 (One More Group Hug).

In 2019, Samojlenko held a non-musical reunion event under the Hullabaloo banner (One Last Group Hug) to mark the release of his memoir Requiem For My Rave, chronicling his personal story through the rave culture of Toronto.

== Discography ==
- The Frolic Files - Happy Hardcore Level 1 (August 3, 1996)
- Happy 2b Hardcore Chapter 1 (January 21, 1997)
- Live @ Not The End 2 (April 5, 1997)
- Live @ Hullabaloo! 1: Something Good (June 21, 1997)
- Happy 2b Hardcore Chapter 2 (September 9, 1997)
- Live @ Hullabaloo! 2: Return of the Vibe (September 10, 1997)
- Live @ Hullabaloo! 3: Love & Magic (November 22, 1997)
- Live @ Hullabaloo! 4: Into the Blue (February 7, 1998)
- Live @ Hullabaloo! 5: Meltdown (April 24, 1998)
- Live @ Hullabaloo! 6: Birthday Funtopia (June 27, 1998)
- Live @ Hullabaloo! WEMF Stage 98 (July 18–20, 1998)
- Live @ Destiny/Next Junction (October 3, 1998)
- Live @ Hullabaloo! 7: Electric Dreams (October 10, 1998)
- Live @ Hullabaloo! 8: Rush Hour (December 8, 1998)
- Live @ Hullabaloo! 9: Big Top (February 6, 1999)
- Live @ Hullabaloo! 10: Foreverland (April 17, 1999)
- Happy 2b Hardcore Chapter 3 (April 20, 1999)
- Live @ Hullabaloo! 11: Birthday Funtopia 2 (June 19, 1999)
- Live @ Hullabaloo! WEMF Stage 99 (July 19–20, 1999)
- Live @ Hullabaloo! 12: View to a Thrill (October 9, 1999)
- Live @ Hullabaloo! 13: For Those Who Know (UK Vs Canada) (December 4, 1999)
- Live @ Hullabaloo! 14: Ooh Crikey... Wot a Scorcher! (February 5, 2000)
- Happy 2b Hardcore Chapter 4 (February 22, 2000)
- Live @ Hullabaloo! 15: Through the Looking Glass (Cancelled - Replaced with "Group Hug") (April 15, 2000)
- Live @ World Electronic Music Festival 2000 (July 15, 2000)
- Live @ Hullabaloo! WEMF Stage 2000 (August 2–4, 2000)
- Live @ Hullabaloo! 16: Birthday Funtopia 3 (October 7, 2000)
- Live @ Hullabaloo! 17: Space Invader (December 9, 2000)
- Happy 2b Hardcore Chapter 5 (January 23, 2001)
- Live @ Hullabaloo! 18: Rhythm of Life (February 3, 2001)
- Live @ Hullabaloo! 19: Group Hug 2001 (April 20, 2001)
- Live @ Hullabaloo! WEMF Stage 2001 (August 2–4, 2001)
- Live @ Hullabaloo! 20: The Hullabaloo! iDance Pre-Party (September 1, 2001)
- Happy 2b Hardcore Chapter 6: The Final Chapter (November 6, 2001)
- Live @ Hullabaloo! 21: Turn Up The Music (November 10, 2001)
- Live @ Hullabaloo! 22: Make Believe (February 16, 2002)
- Live @ Hullabaloo! 23: Field of Dreams (May 11, 2002)
- Live @ Hullabaloo! 24: The Anthems (July 5, 2002)
- Live @ Hullabaloo! WEMF Stage 2002 (July 19–20, 2002)
- Live @ Hullabaloo! 25: Warp Factor (September 28, 2002)
- Live @ Hullabaloo! 26: Digital Outlaws (December 14, 2002)
- Happy 2b Hardcore Chapter 7: A New Beginning (January 21, 2003)
- Live @ Hullabaloo! 27: Power Of Dreams (February 8, 2003)
- Live @ Hullabaloo! 28: Get Hype (April 19, 2003)
- Live @ Hullabaloo! 29: Stay Here Forever (July 5, 2003)
- Live @ Hullabaloo! 30: Fires in the Sky (September 20, 2003)
- Live @ Hullabaloo! 31: Enchanted (December 6, 2003)
- Live @ Hullabaloo! 32: Accelerator (February 7, 2004)
- Live @ Hullabaloo! 33: Sail Away (April 17, 2004)
- Live @ Hullabaloo! 34: Birthday Funtopia 7 (July 3, 2004)
- Live @ Hullabaloo! 35: Drift on a Dream (September 18, 2004)
- Live @ Hullabaloo! 36: Back & Forth (December 11, 2004)
- Live @ Hullabaloo! 37: Pacific Sun (February 5, 2005)
- Live @ Hullabaloo! 36: Lost in Space (April 30, 2005)
- Live @ The Hullabaloo! Pre-Party Extravaganza (July 8, 2005)
- Live @ Hullabaloo! 37: All Good Things (July 9, 2005)
- Happy 2b Hardcore Chapter 8: The Lost Mix (March 5, 2007)
- Live @ Hullabaloo! 38: One More Group Hug (July 14, 2007)

== Happy2bHardcore discography ==
=== Chapter 1 ===
This was the start to the series of albums released by Anabolic Frolic, and was released on January 21, 1997.

- Track list
1. Reach Out - Eruption
2. Higher Love - JDS
3. Go Insane - DJ DNA
4. Feel The Power - DJ Codeine & Unknown
5. It's Not Over - Seduction & Dougal
6. Forever - Bananaman
7. Here I Am - DJ Demo, DJ Ham, Justin Time
8. Surrender - Eruption
9. Here We Go Again - DJ Ham
10. I Believe - DJ Stompy
11. Heart Of Gold - Force & Styles
12. Muzik - DJ Demo
13. Dawn of a New Era - DJ Stompy
14. Let The Music - Eruption
15. Now is the Time - Scott Brown Vs Dj Rab S
16. Wanting To Get High - Hixxy

=== Chapter 2 ===
The second chapter in the series was released on September 9, 1997.

- Track list
1. Crowd Control (Vinylgroover remix) - Ramos, Supreme
2. Killer - Demo
3. Eternity - Jimmy J, Jenka, Justin Time
4. Time - Vinylgroover
5. You're Mine - DJ Demo
6. Cloudy Daze - Bang!
7. 12" Of Love [97 remix]
8. I Feel You - DJ Fade, Martina
9. Natural High [Anabolic Frolic's H2BH] - Unknown
10. Kick Your Legs
11. See The Light - Brisk, Lenny, Trixxy
12. Big Up The Bass - Blaze
13. Sweet In The Pocket '97 - Justin Time, Blaze
14. Get into Love - Anti-Social
15. People's Party [remix] - Hixxy, Sunset Regime
16. Keep On Trying [Slipmatt remix] - Alchemist, Fade

=== Chapter 3 ===
The third chapter in the series was released on April 20, 1999.

- Track list
1. Distant Skies - Unique
2. Break Of Dawn [Brisk & Ham mix] - Bang!
3. Eurolove - Brisk, Trixxy
4. Wonderful World [Brisk remix] - Triple J
5. Sunrize - Trixxy
6. Don't Go Away - Visa
7. Shooting Star [Ham mix] - Bang!
8. Innovate - Innovate
9. Sensation - Sy, Demo
10. Till We Meet Again - DJ Slam
11. You Belong To Me - Eternity, King Size
12. Tears Run Cold - Sy, Demo
13. Pleasure And Pain [Justin Time remix] - Ad-Man, Demo
14. Eye Opener - Brisk, Trixxy
15. Let Me Play - DJ Hyperactive

=== Chapter 4 ===
The fourth chapter in the series was released on February 22, 2000.

- Track list
1. Space Odyssey - Vinylgroover & Trixxy
2. Everytime I Close My Eyes - Scott Brown, Gillian Tenant
3. Better Day [[[Sy & Unknown]] remix] - GBT Inc.
4. Hear Me - Mr. X
5. All That You See & Hear - Elevate
6. John Gotti's Revenge - Vinygroover & Trixxy
7. Raver's Anthem - MC Storm, Sy & Unknown
8. Run To Me [Brisk remix] - Elogic
9. Elysium - Scott Brown
10. Love Of My Life [Brisk remix] - Northern Lights
11. I Want You - Lisa Abbott, BDB
12. Mirror Of Love - Ina
13. Clearly Now [Brisk remix] - Frisky & Daniella
14. Give Me A Reason - Bang!
15. See Me Climb [Brisk remix] - Stealth

=== Chapter 5 ===
The fifth chapter of the series was released on January 23, 2001

- Track list
1. Music I Like - Fabulous Faber
2. Blue Moon - DJ Kaos, Ethos
3. Excitement - Fabulous Faber
4. Feels So Right - Anabolic Frolic
5. Lost Generation - Scott Brown
6. Sail Away [Trixxy mix]
7. Sunshine - Force & Styles
8. Stay With Me - DJ Demo, The Sy Project
9. Pilgrim 2000 - Scott Brown
10. Shelter Me - Anabolic Frolic
11. 2000 Style - Robbie Long & Coyote
12. Take It From The Groove [DNA and Breeze mix]
13. Oblivion [Ham mix]
14. Space Invader [Scott Brown remix] - Euphony
15. Power Of Love - Q-Tex

=== Chapter 6: The Final Chapter ===
The sixth and "final" chapter was released on November 6, 2001.

- Track list
1. Drift On A Dream - Ethos
2. All I Need [Kaos remix]- Visa
3. Turn Up The Music - Scott Brown
4. Deep Inside - DJ UFO
5. Jump A Little Higher - Breeze & MC Storm
6. Euphoric State - DNA
7. Toy Town [remix] - Hixxy & Sharkey
8. Roll The Track - Interstate
9. Look At Me Now - Force & Styles
10. Influence - DJ Slam & Helix
11. Flyin High - DJ UFO & Stu J
12. About U - DNA & Ham
13. Can't Stop - [Brisk remix] - Midas
14. Come Together - Hixxy
15. Make Believe - Force & Styles

=== Chapter 7: A New Beginning ===
The 7th chapter of the series, is the revival of the initial series, was released on January 21, 2003.

- Track list
1. Intro- MC Jumper @ Hullabaloo
2. Don't Cry For Me - Dougal & Innovate
3. Like An Angel - Q-tex
4. Follow Me[Breeze and Styles remix]- Force & Styles
5. Fly With You - DJ Fade
6. Power Of Dreams - DJ Impact
7. Create - DJ Ufo
8. I'm Ready - Hixxy
9. Shine a Light - Nimrod
10. Definition of a Badboy - Hardcore Authority
11. My Way[Hixxy remix] - Antisocial
12. Lost - Kaos & Ethos
13. Till The Day [Blizzard remix] - Blaze!
14. Get Hype - Dougal & Gammer
15. You're Shining - Breeze & Styles
16. Just Accept It - Hixxy Ft. MC Storm

=== Chapter 8: The Lost Mix ===
The 8th chapter of the series, was given to all the attendees of the Hullabaloo! event "One More Group Hug" on July 14, 2007.

- Track list
1. Break of Dawn (Scott Brown remix) - Force & Jack Speed feat. Lisa Abbott
2. Through the Darkness (Dougal & Gammar remix) - Mickey Skeedale feat. Jenna
3. Lift Me Up - Dowster & Uprise
4. Ordinary People - Dougal & Gammer
5. 24/7 (Breeze & Styles remix) - Eclipse
6. Shadow of a Memory - Arkitech
7. Heaven's Above (Hixxy remix) - Adam Harris
8. Fires in the Sky - Dougal & Gammer
9. Pay Attention - DJ Ham
10. Neckbreaker (Essential Platinum remix) - Scott Brown
11. You're My Angel - Breeze & Styles
12. Make the Beat Drop - Scott Brown
13. True Awareness - Vagabond feat. MC Casper
14. Stay Here Forever - Brisk & Fade
15. Heartbeats (Scott Brown remix) - Breeze & Styles
16. Field of Dreams - Force & Styles

== Sources ==
- Anabolic Frolic's personal webpage
- Happy Hardcore Online database (CD track listings)
- Anabolic Frolic on MySpace
- Article about closure
