= DJ Micro =

American trance DJ and producer

- Birth name: Michael Marsicano
- Genres: House, Hard house, Hardstyle, Trance, Acid breaks
- Occupation(s): DJ, producer
- Website: www.djmicro.com (currently unavailable)

DJ Micro (born Michael Marsicano) is an American trance DJ and producer.

== History ==
DJ Micro began on the East Coast, where in 1991 he helped form the Caffeine Records collective in Deer Park, NY. Caffeine began as a weekly club night, and Micro spun at many of Caffeine's parties, specializing in acid breaks. In 1994 he joined with Vicious Vic under the name Progression. They released a debut single Reach Further, and were later commissioned to remix the artists Paradise 3001, Joe T. Vanelli, Masters at Work, and The X-Files theme.

He recorded two mix albums for Roadrunner in the late 1990s, Coast to Coast (1997) and Caffeine: The Natural Stimulant (1998). Micro's first release for Moonshine Music, Micro-Tech Mix (1998), was followed by a succession of mix albums, usually one released annually, including Tech-Mix-Live in 2001.

DJ Micro toured the U.S. recording mix albums for Moonshine Music, slightly changing his style with each album, and moved toward trance while maintaining his breakbeat emphasis.

== Albums ==
- Coast To Coast (1997)
- Caffeine: The DJ Micro Blend (1998)
- Micro-Tech-Mix (1998)
- Micro-Tech-Mix Version 2.0 (1999)
- Tech-Mix 2000 (2000)
- djmixed.com/micro (2000)
- Micro Tech-Mix Live (2001)
- Music Through Me (2002)
- My Frequency 001 (2003)
- Out Through the Input (2005)
- Tech-Mix 5 (2005)
- Direct Konnect (2006)
- Past Present Future, Vol. 2 (2007)
