= Hullabaloo (rave) =

Canadian rave promotions company

Hullabaloo (or "Hulla") was a rave promotions company based in Toronto, Ontario, Canada. Hullabaloo was started in 1997 by DJ Anabolic Frolic as a way to promote Happy Hardcore music and the kind of event that got back to the roots of what a rave was.

Hullabaloo held a total of 44 events in eight years, attended by over 100,000 people. Many of the events sold out in advance.

The first Hullabaloo party was "Something Good", held on June 21, 1997. The rave was hosted at The SpacE! (a.k.a. "The E! Space") at 28 Gunns Rd., Toronto. Party headliner, DJ Hixxy from England, was held up by customs at Pearson International Airport and was unable to perform.

Hullabaloo reached its peak in popularity in 1999 when crowds of 4,000 were attending their events. The death of Allen Ho at a Hullabaloo event in 1999 resulted in a coroner's inquest and in increased scrutiny from the media and the local authorities. Faced with legal battles and logistical problems with venues and police, Hullabaloo was forced to cancel an event and downsize as a result.

Hullabaloo eventually found its home at The Opera House in Toronto where it stayed until it ended.

Tickets for the final event, "All Good Things", on July 9, 2005 sold out in a record-setting 8 days, 5 months in advance (Tickets went on sale February 2005). Seventeen of the events were promoted without a flyer, relying solely on word of mouth of its die-hard fans.

Hullabaloo returned for a reunion party, "Hullabaloo: One More Group Hug", on July 14, 2007. They also screened a movie, Hullabaloo: A Raving Chronicle on July 13, 2007. Tickets went on sale March 5, 2007, and were sold out as of early morning March 7, 2007. There were various ticket packages available, and all of them came with special keepsakes such as an exclusive copy of the never-released Happy 2B Hardcore: Chapter 8 CD.

A final Hullabaloo reunion, "One Last Group Hug" was held on November 19, 2019 as a non-musical event at The Opera House for the release of Frolic's memoir Requiem For My Rave.

== See also ==
- Rave
- Happy hardcore
