= Law of the Jungle (album) =

Compilation album by various artists
- Released: 18 October 1994
- Recorded: 1993–1994
- Studio: Trinity Studios, London
- Genre: Jungle, ragga jungle
- Length: 60:14
- Label: Moonshine Music
- Producer: Various

Law of the Jungle is a compilation album of various early jungle music tracks by various artists, released in 1994 in the United States on Moonshine Music. Jungle had started to emerge in the United Kingdom a couple of years earlier but despite its growth, albeit slow, in the United States, no jungle albums were available on the American market. Moonshine conceived the album as a primer for jungle music for American shores, using music from British jungle label SOUR Records, and as a spin-off to their fast tempo techno compilation series Speed Limit 140 BPM+. Law of the Jungle was the first jungle album released in the United States.

The music on the album features typical jungle characteristics including influences from ragga, dub and dancehall, cut-up breakbeats, rude boy motifs and lyrics of urban alienation. The album sold 15,000 copies in the United States and was a major critical success, with many critics describing the album as a great introduction to jungle music. Furthermore, the album has also been credited as helping spread popularity of the genre in the United States. In 1999, music critic Ned Raggett named the album the 15th greatest album of the 1990s, and the decade's greatest compilation album.

== Background ==
Jungle music emerged circa 1992 in London and Bristol, characterised by its pulsating, fast tempos (150 to 200 bpm), relatively slow and lyrical reggae-derived basslines, breakbeats (often cut-up using breaks such as the Amen break), and other heavily syncopated percussive loops. According to Tim Haslett of CMJ New Music Monthly in his review of Law of the Jungle, described the original jungle sound present on the album as "constructed of sped-up drum breaks from '70s funk records from everyone to James Brown to Jimmy Castor and Hermann Kelly." New York Magazine meanwhile described its influence from hip hop and "dancehall, dub and techno music that's distinguished by a frantic speed, a deep, detached bass pulse and a staicky surface of radio sound bites and unintelligble ragamuffin-style vocals," citing the genre's similarity to "early punk rock–at least in its tempo, noise levels and desired effect on the more conservative segments of British society."

While jungle music's underground spread was large in its native United Kingdom, it was "slowly but surely" reaching North America, where much of the music was unavailable. As no albums of jungle were available in the United States, Law of the Jungle was conceived and distributed by Moonshine Music, an american electronic label primarily known for releasing techno music, as a jungle compilation for American shores under exclusive licence from British jungle label SOUR Records (Sounds of the Underground), whose catalogue, all of which was recorded at Trinity Studios in London, is used on the album. It was the first spin-off to Moonshine's Speed Limit 140 BPM+ series of compilations of fast-tempo techno music. Credited as executive producer, Stephen Levy compiled the album with David Stone, mastered it with Dave Aude West Hollywood studio The Still and is credited alongside Stan Endo for art direction. Mateo drew the illustration on the album cover.

== Music ==
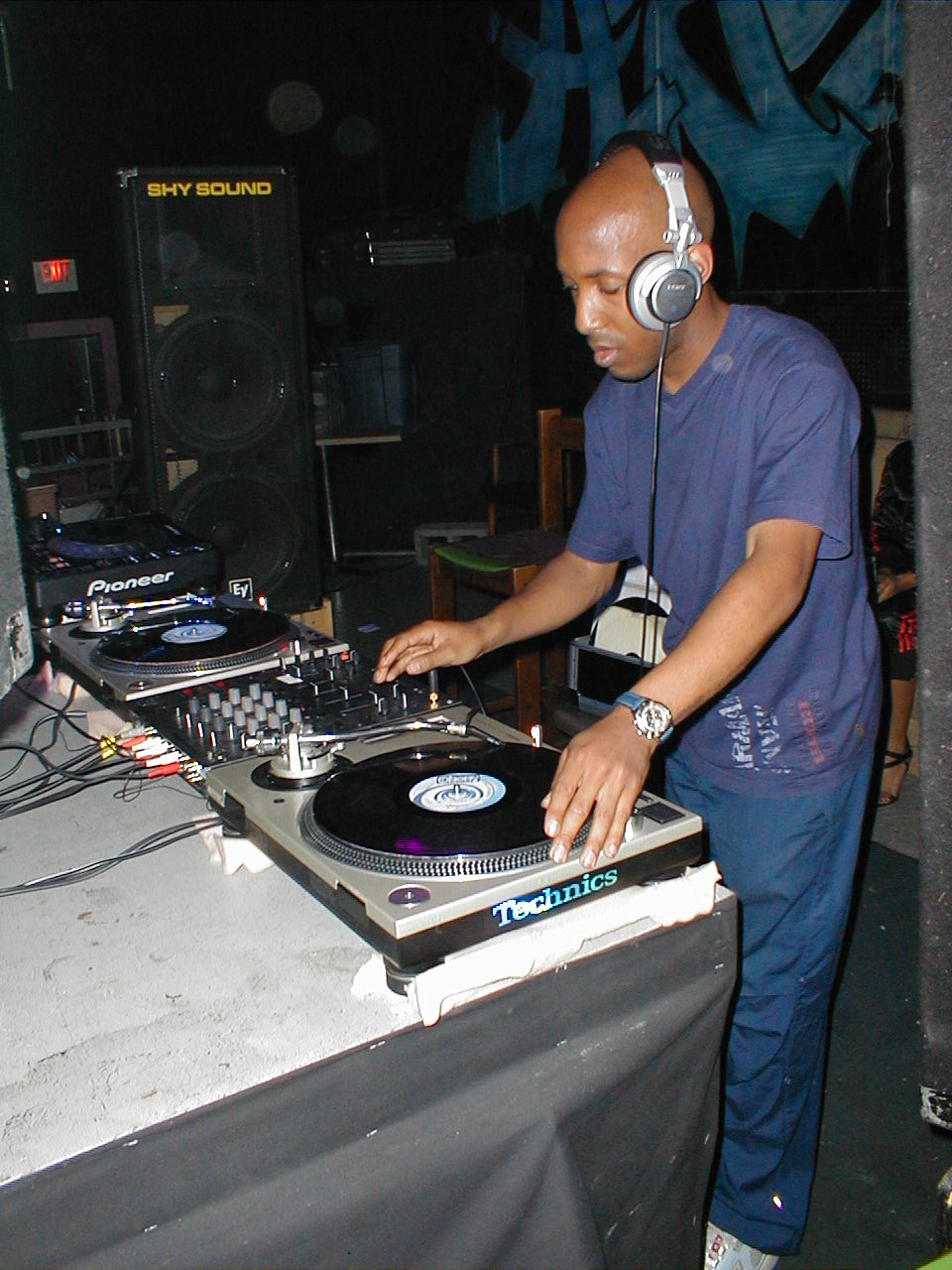
Shy FX (pictured in 2004).

Described by Simon Reynolds as "containing some of the fiercest examples of this ragga-jungle style," all the music on Law of the Jungle was licensed from SOUR Records, who have referred to the album as "the key" to their American success. Prior to the album's release, the music on the album was notoriously difficult for jungle enthusiasts in the United States to find on import. Ned Raggett, writing about the album for Freaky Trigger, described the album as a product of when jungle music was "freed from a variety of attentions": "this was when a bunch of characters just thought, 'Hm! Wonder what happens if…'."

The music is "heavy on the gangster/rude boy vibe," reflected in the titles of "Hustling," "Original Gangsta," "Heartless" and "Original Nuttah", and in the lyrical delivery throughout the album, with "some of the most aggressively fun vocabs and ways around things vocally than most could ever dream of." The "dub bass moves and the drop-ins of shotguns and echo," which have been compared to Lee Perry, give the music a dancehall vibe, which, according to Raggett, is "why you have Junior Dan going on about being heartless with a sweet-touched reggae backing at points even while the drums are going wonderfully nuts all around him."

Many of the songs concern urban alienation, and while, according to Raggett, "staying one step ahead of capture" in the "urban jungle" was not necessarily a new subject for music, the speed to the music is essential, "because this isn't being cool and head-nodding, it's bolting forward." "Reflection does not belong here," wrote Raggett, "and there's no real point in big chants when the next sudden shift is around the corner. But the thing is that it's not all that, because then it wouldn't be fun. And fun is paramount."

=== Songs ===
"The first thing you hear is this totally crazed voice mixing any number of accents, slang words, everything -- there's an "all roight, mate!" in there somewhere, I know -- and what sounds like an aggro siren going off in the background. And then the bass and the beats kick, and do they ever."

—Ned Raggett (1999)

Shy FX and UK Apache's "Original Nuttah", as well as "Original Gangstah," also by Shy FX in collaboration with Gunsmoke, were described as the album's highlights by Tim Haslett of the CMJ New Music Monthly, citing the songs' energy and "aura of promise and excitement recalling the exhilaration surrounding Run-DMC's 'Sucker MC'." The former song samples an "ambient drone" from "Black Sunday" by Cypress Hill which, according to Simon Reynolds, "underscores the G-funk thread running from London, Los Angeles and Kingston," while the latter track, a "snare drum-dominated" song which "unforgettably shouts the terrors and joys of black London," samples dialogue from Goodfellas.

"Blow Out Jungle VIP" by Bass Selective features a "discosalsa piano line, synth strings and diva vocals slammed into it all." "Heaven n' Hell" by MC Olive n' Slam Collective features brooding samples in its background. T. Power's "Elemental" features a sampled quote about "the beast man" in its introduction and has been described as "a strange tightrope-walk of music, clean and clinical without being dead." Critics have noted its "razor sharp drum cuts start up" and "synths and noises." "Hustling" by Booyaka Crew features vocals from dancehall musician Tippa Irie.

== Release and reception ==
Professional ratings
Review scores
Source	Rating
AllMusic	3/5 stars
CMJ New Music Monthly	(favourable)
New York Magazine	(favourable)
Vibe	(favourable)

Law of the Jungle was released on 18 October 1994 in the United States by Moonshine Music, and was the first jungle compilation released in the United States. The album was the first spin-off of Moonshine's Speed Limit 140 BPM+ series. Moonshine sent copies of Law of the Jungle with VHS copies of the BBC jungle music documentary Anatomy of a Fresh Vibe to journalists in order to improve their knowledge on jungle. In addition to CD, the album was also released on red vinyl. Law of the Jungle sold 15,000 copies, and in 1995 became a success with radio, reaching number 1 on CMJ's Top 25 Dance chart, compiled from the magazine's RPM chart which combined airplay reports of electronic music from numerous commercial, non-commercial and college radio stations.

Tim Haslett of CMJ New Music Monthly said Law of the Jungle was an "exemplary album" for jungle music, a "splendid collection of tracks [documenting] a genre that has arisen out of a specifically Black British context," and a "an outstanding introduction" to the genre. New York Magazine also called the album an "excellent introduction" to jungle music, and was "worth it, if only so you can I.D. the crashing new sounds hurling out of clubs this month." Simon Reynolds of Vibe was favourable, claiming the album to contain "lovely" ragga-jungle music, while reviewing the album alongside the fifth edition of the Speed Limit 140 BPM series, whose "intelligent drum and bass" music he said was more "provocative" than Law of the Jungle. Norman Weinstein of Wired called the album a "smartly compiled anthology" and recommended it alongside Crammed Discs' compilations Renegade Selector and Jungle Vibes.

As the first jungle album released in the United States, it helped spread the reach of the genre in the country. Critical acclaim for the album has also not waned over time, with the album being seen as a major jungle compilation; in 1999, Ned Raggett of Freaky Trigger ranked the album at number 15 in his list of "The Top 136 or So Albums of the 90s", the highest ranked various artists album on the list. Raggett said "this wasn't the first jungle collection, and it may not have all the notable early tracks. Oh, but does it kick, thrive, live, flow," and concluded: "Music that could contain the universe that conservative rock jerks and self-righteous ambient types hated. Of course it is brilliant." Larry Flick of Billboard called the album "sizzling."

== Track listing ==
1. U.K. Apachi / Shy FX – "Original Nuttah" (A. Williams, A.W. Lafta) – 4:54
2. Potential Bad Boy w/MC Det – "What's Your Name" ( M. Royal) – 4:21
3. Junior Dan – "Heartless" (A. Williams) – 6:06
4. Bass Selective – "Blow Out Jungle VIP" (Royal, Samual, Clarke, Hill) – 6:13
5. T. Power – "Elemental" (M. Royal) – 5:38
6. MC Olive 'N SLAM Collective – "Heaven 'N Hell" (K. Fry, P.L. Hansen) – 5:48
7. Shy FX / Gunsmoke – "Original Gangsta" (A. Williams) – 4:59
8. Junior Dan – "Nuh Here" (A. Williams) – 5:16
9. Booyaka Crew & Tippa Irie – "Hustling" (Alan Emptage, Tony Henry*, Fitzroy Simms, Sugar Minnot) – 6:15
10. T. Power – "Lipsing Jamring" (M. Royal) – 6:15
11. Potential Bad Boy N' Chatter B. – "Vibes" (A. Patterson, C. McFarlane) – 4:27

== Personnel ==
- Stan Endo – art direction
- Stephen Levy – art direction, compiler, executive producer, mastering
- David Stone – compiler
- Mateo – illustration
- Dave Aude – mastering
