= Mapping Festival =

Live visuals, installation art and VJing international festival held in Switzerland

- Genre: live video performance
- Dates: Beginning of May (10 days)
- Location(s): Geneva, Switzerland
- Years active: Every year
- Website: mappingfestival.ch

The Mapping Festival is an international festival dedicated to live visuals, installation art and VJing. Held annually in Geneva, Switzerland, it features audiovisual and VJ performances in nightclubs and installations in gallery spaces.

== History ==
Mapping Festival took place in the following years

- 2005
- 2006
- 2007
- 2008
- 2009
- 2010
- 2011
- 2012
- 2013
- 2014
- 2015
- 2016
- 2017
- 2018
- 2019
- 2020 (canceled in its original format)
- 2021 "2051"
- 2022
- 2023
- 2024 : 20th edition

== 2012 festival ==
The 2012 Mapping Festival will take place from May 10–20 in Geneva (Switzerland).

The following venues hosted events for the 2012 Mapping Festival:

- Le Commun (BAC)
- Cinéma Spoutnik / Usine
- Fonderie Kugler
- Théâtre du Galpon
- Théâtre de l'Usine / Usine
- La Gravière
- Zoo / Usine
- Musée d'art et d'histoire (MAH)

== 2011 festival ==
The 2011 Mapping Festival took place from May 20-22 in Geneva (Switzerland).

- Cinéma Spoutnik / Usine
- Manuel Chantre, Memorsion / Bâtiment d’art contemporain (BAC)

== 2010 festival ==
The 2010 Mapping Festival took place between May 6 and May 16, 2010 in Geneva (Switzerland).

The following venues hosted events for the 2010 Mapping Festival:

- Bâtiment d’art contemporain (BAC)
- Cinéma Spoutnik / Usine
- Espace St Gervais
- MÀD
- Théâtre de la Parfumerie
- Théâtre du Grütli
- Zoo / Usine

== 2009 festival ==
The 2009 Mapping Festival took place between May 8 and May 17 May 2009 in Geneva (Switzerland).
