= TTM 57 SL =

DJ mixer

- Developers: Serato Audio Research and Rane Corporation
- Operating system: Microsoft Windows, Mac OS X
- Type: DJ mixer
- Website: http://www.rane.com/ttm57sl.html

The TTM 57SL is an audio mixer console, also known as a DJ mixer, designed by Rane Corporation. Rane and their software partner Serato, also known as Serato Scratch Live, teamed up together to create the TTM 57SL from Rane's prior TTM 56 disc jockey DJ mixer. The unique feature of this DJ mixer is that Serato and Rane brought their respective software and mixer hardware to create a hybrid mixer integrating two products into one, thus making it the first DJ mixer of its kind.

== Features ==
From the mixer's control panel of the TTM 57SL one can:

- Control Effects
- Set and Use Cue Point
- Edit Loops and Loop Songs
- Navigate Through the Library
- Load Tracks
- Record

=== Joysticks and P Knobs ===
Unlike other DJ mixers, the TTM 57SL has Joysticks, J1 and J2, which spread out the features of the TTM 57SL mixer. The joysticks J1 and J2 can:

- Temporary Reverse a Song
- Rewind or Fast-forward Through a Song
- Change the BPM Multiplier for Effects
- Set Temporary Cue Points
- And other features

P1 and P2 knobs also have special usage which expand the TTM 57SL’s functions. Usage of the P1 and P2 knobs includes:

- Start and End Loop
- Editing Loops
- Scrolling Through Library Songs
- Change how Wet or Dry an Effect is
- Uploading Song to Deck 1 or Deck 2
- And other features

=== Effects ===
Unlike the TTM 56, the TTM 57SL includes effects that can be used internally from the mixer. Also, a list of different effects can be chosen from Serato’s software Scratch Live. Like many dj mixers with effects, the TTM 57SL has knobs for the effects usage. The effects can be changed to fit the BPM, beats per minute, or how dry or wet the effect is, how much of the effect is heard. Originally, the TTM 57SL was shipped with two effects, Echo and LFO Filter; however, more effects have been added since then. The TTM57 also allows two effects to be used at the same time, which other dj mixers do not. These two effects can be simultaneously assigned to:

- Microphone
- AUX bus
- Main Mix
- PGM 1
- PGM 2
- Fader

The big difference from the TTM 57SL and other dj mixers with effects is the controllability that the TTM 57SL has on its software, Serato, straight from the mixer. The TTM 57SL also has 6 switches that control the effects:

- Two Rotary Knobs (P1 and P2)
- Two Joysticks (J1 and J2)
- Two Buttons (Group and Deck selection)

=== Cue Points ===
Cue points are visible markers which are set in a part of a song and are mostly, in djing, used to mark a special place in a song. The TTM 57SL dj mixer has this unique feature of inserting cue points straight from this dj mixer—up to 5 cue points can be set.

=== Looping ===
Loops, in djing, are portions of a song which are repeated over and over again. DJ looping started in Hip Hop where djs would repeat a certain part of a song so the crowd and break-dancers can dance to, this may also be known as the breaks. The TTM 57SL dj mixer loops songs simultaneously by the push of a button. This unique feature of looping is also editable to either extend or shorten the loop by using the knobs on the mixer.

=== Navigating Through Library ===
Another unique feature of the TTM 57SL is its ability to navigate through the library from the mixer. From the TTM 57SL, using the P knobs, song can be uploaded to either deck 1 or deck 2 (left deck or right deck).

=== Recording ===
Unlike other dj mixers, the TTM 57SL allows a DJ set or DJ mix, an entire or parts of a DJ's mixing, to be recorded. Vocals or sounds can also be recorded through a microphone and then used in a DJ mix. Like the effects, TTM 57SL records through 6 signal paths:

- AUX Bus
- Microphone
- Main Mix
- PGM 1
- PGM 2
- Fader

=== Sound Card ===
Another unique feature of the TTM 57SL is that it can also be used as a standalone sound card, also known as an audio card. The TTM 57SL has a sound card integrated that can be used through the USB cable when not using Serato.

== Changes from the TTM 56 ==
Rane's previous mixer, the TTM 56, was similar in many respects to the TTM 57SL. The TTM 57SL is slight bigger than the TTM 56. The TTM 57 is 13.3"H x 10"W (33.782 cm x 25.4 cm) and the TTM 56 is 13.05"H x 9"W. (33.147 x 22.9 cm) .

=== Top Panel ===
One of the biggest changes seen at first sight is that they added more mixing buses, knobs that are on the mixer. INPUT knobs, PAN knobs, Deck button, Group button, J1 and J2 Joysticks, P1 and P2 Knobs, Stereo House button, EQ Kill Switch, Channel Swap button, Booth knob, and B1 – B6 buttons have been added to the top of the mixers control panel. This gives the user more control and the mixer more features from the top panel.

http://i45.tinypic.com/20aup2w.jpg - TTM 57SL Top View http://i49.tinypic.com/1zq7aed.jpg - TTM 56 Top View

=== Front Panel ===
In the front of the TTM 57SL they added footswitch jack right next the headphone jack for hands-free functions in Scratch Live. There are also two head phone jacks, a quarter inch and one-eighth inch, for more variety of headphones. They removed the mode button that was on the TTM 56. Also, the TTM 57SL does not have the "Contour A" and "Contour B" cross fader knobs in the front, along with the reverse button and moved it to the top of the panel for more control.

=== Rear Panel ===
Only a few things changed from the rear panel. The phono-grounds, from the TTM 57SL, were moved closer to the power outlet so everything would not be so closed-in together and for free space. The AUX Out and In RCA jacks were moved next to the PGM1 and PGM2 RCA jacks so all the RCA’s jacks could be next to each other. Also, all the TRS Jacks, also known as Quarter Inch jacks, have been moved together for organization. 3 Point Jacks have been added for Main outputs. A USB output was also added to connect the TTM 57SL with a computer.
