= DJ Baby Anne =

American DJ and music producer

- Also known as: The Bass Queen
- Born: November 17, 1972 (age 53)
- Origin: Orlando, Florida, United States
- Genres: Breakbeat, dubstep, electro, Florida breaks, Miami bass, trance
- Occupation: DJ
- Instruments: Turntable, Sampler
- Years active: 1992–2016
- Labels: Zone; Phattraxx; Pandisc; Moonshine; System; Bad Baby; Moist; Dynamix II Records; Static System

DJ Baby Anne (born Marianne Breslin; November 17, 1972) is an Orlando-based DJ who worked with live sets and original mixes that fused electro with Miami bass and funky breaks. DJ Baby Anne announced her retirement in 2016, concluding her farewell tour at The Social nightclub in Orlando.

== Chart hits ==
The single "Probe" reached No. 5 on the Billboard Hot Dance Maxi-Singles Sales chart in 2002.

The album Mixtress reached No. 12 on the Billboard Top Electronic Albums chart in 2004.

== Discography ==
- Bass Queen: In the Mix, Volume 1 - A Bass and Breaks Continuous Mix (1999)
- Bass Queen: In the Mix, Volume 2 (2000)
- Dark Side of the Boom (2001)
- I'm About to Break (2002)
- Mixed Live at Club Ra in Las Vegas (2003)
- Mixtress (2004)
- Assault and Battery EP (with Jen Lasher) (2005)
- Baby Anne Rocks! (2006)
- Past, Present, Future (2007)
- Ground N' Pound (2008)
- I Heart Bass (2009)
- Babylicious (2010)
- Bottom Heavy (2011)
- Bad Baby (2012)
- Beauty of the Beats (2013)
- Disturbing the Beats (2014)
- Full Circle (2015)
- Bass Switch (2018)
