= Vujak =

Video editing tool

VuJak being used

VuJak is an early video sampler, a VJ remix and mashup tool created in 1992 by Brian Kane, Lisa Eisenpresser, and Jay Haynes. The original name of the project was Mideo, but it was later changed to VuJak.

VuJak was based on MIDI control of video in real-time. It was created with MAX from Opcode Systems, and utilized the newly released QuickTime 1.0 movie object.

The first working version of the program was built on a Mac IIfx with 8 megs of ram, and could jump in real-time across a 160 x 120 pixel QuickTime movie via a midi keyboard.

Later versions could manipulate full screen video, included the first real-time video scratch feature, had looping, vari-speed, and random play features, and allowed for recording and editing of video sequences within the application. VuJak also had networking capabilities which allowed artists to "jam" in real time across standard phone lines.

The first public exhibition of VuJak was at the Digital Hollywood conference in Beverly Hills in 1993, where it was promoted by Timothy Leary.

VuJak was featured in Mondo 2000, CBS Evening News, Wired Magazine, Electronic Musician, Billboard Magazine, The Hollywood Reporter, and it was used to create promotional videos for MTV. In 1994, VuJak was a featured interactive exhibition at the Exploratorium in San Francisco.

Development of VuJak ceased in 1995.
