= VJing =

Broad designation for real-time visual performance

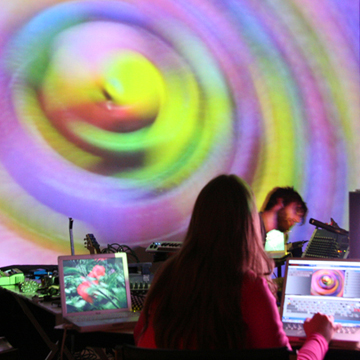
A VJ working with computers with their projection in the background

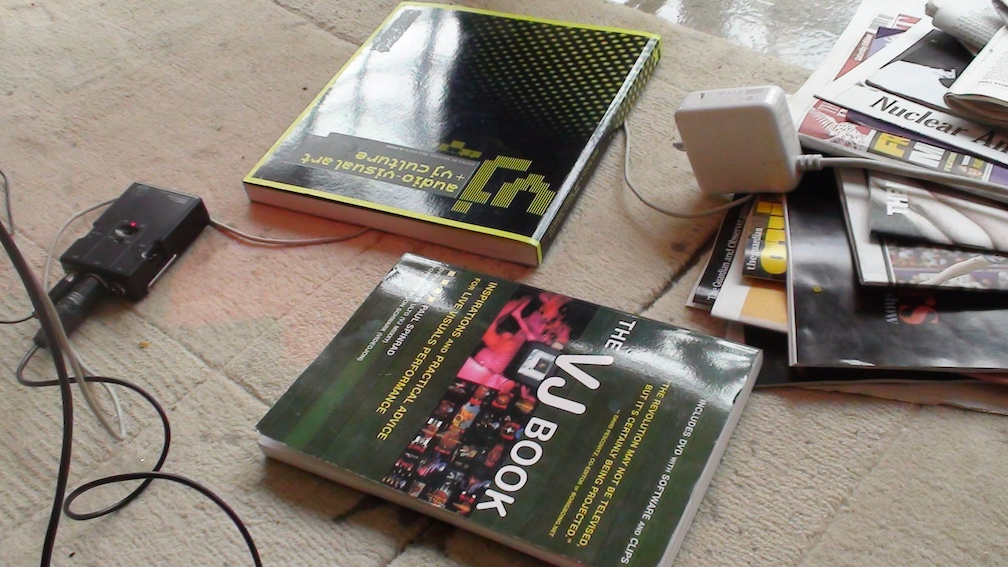
The VJ Book and VJ:Audio Visual Art + VJ Culture

VJing (pronounced: VEE-JAY-ing) is a broad designation for real-time visual performance. Characteristics of VJing are the creation or manipulation of imagery in realtime through technological mediation and for an audience, in synchronization to music. VJing often takes place at events such as concerts, nightclubs, music festivals and sometimes in combination with other performative arts. This results in a live multimedia performance that can include music, actors and dancers. The term VJing became popular in its association with MTV's Video Jockey but its origins date back to the New York club scene of the 1970s. In both situations VJing is the manipulation or selection of visuals, the same way DJing is a selection and manipulation of audio.

One of the key elements in the practice of VJing is the real-time mix of content from a "library of media", on storage media such as VHS tapes or DVDs, video and still image files on computer hard drives, live camera input, or from computer generated visuals. In addition to the selection of media, VJing mostly implies realtime processing of the visual material. The term is also used to describe the performative use of generative software, although the word "becomes dubious ... since no video is being mixed".

== History ==
=== Antecedents ===
Historically, VJing gets its references from art forms that deal with the synesthetic experience of vision and sound. These historical references are shared with other live audiovisual art forms, such as Live Cinema, to include the camera obscura, the panorama and diorama, the magic lantern, color organ, and liquid light shows.

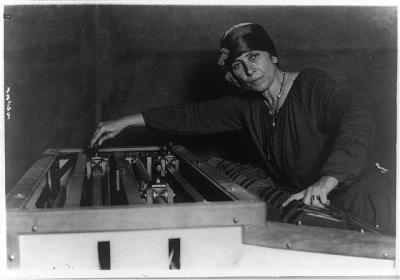
Mary Hallock-Greenewalt and her electric light "color organ"

The color organ is a mechanism to make colors correspond to sound through mechanical and electromechanic means. Bainbridge Bishop, who contributed to the development of the color organ, was "dominated with the idea of painting music". In a book from 1893 that documents his work, Bishop states: "I procured an organ, and experimented by building an attachment to the keys, which would play with different colored lights to correspond with the music of the instrument."

Between 1919 and 1927, Mary Hallock-Greenewalt, a piano soloist, created a new technological art form called Nourathar, which means "essence of light" in Arabic. Her light music consisted of environmental color fields that produced a scale of light intensities and color. "In place of a keyboard, the Sarabet had a console with graduated sliders and other controls, more like a modern mixing board. Lights could be adjusted directly via the sliders, through the use of a pedal, and with toggle switches that worked like individual keys."

In clubs and private events in the 1960s "people used liquid-slides, disco balls and light projections on smoke to give the audience new sensations. Some of these experiments were linked to the music, but most of the time they functioned as decorations." These came to be known as liquid light shows. From 1965 to 1966 in San Francisco, the visual shows by artist collectives such as The Joshua Light Show and the Brotherhood of Light accompanied The Grateful Dead concerts, which were inspired by the Beat Generation—in particular the Merry Pranksters—and fueled by the "expansion of consciousness" from the Acid Tests.

The Exploding Plastic Inevitable, between 1966 and 1967, organized by Andy Warhol contributed to the fusion of music and visuals in a party context. "The Exploding Party project examined the history of the party as an experimental artistic format, focusing in particular on music visualization - also in live contexts"

=== 1970s ===
==== Important events ====
During the late 1970s video and music performance became more tightly integrated. At concerts, a few bands started to have regular film/video along with their music. Experimental film maker Tony Potts was considered an unofficial member of The Monochrome Set for his work on lighting design and film making for projections for live shows. Test Department initially worked with "Bert" Turnball as their resident visual artist, creating slideshows and film for live performances. The organization, Ministry of Power included collaborations with performance groups, traditional choirs and various political activists. Industrial bands would perform in art contexts, as well as in concert halls, and often with video projections. Groups like Cabaret Voltaire started to use low cost video editing equipment to create their own time-based collages for their sound works. In their words, "before [the use of video], you had to do collages on paper, but now you present them in rhythm—living time—in video." The film collages made by and for groups such as the Test Dept, Throbbing Gristle and San Francisco's Tuxedomoon became part of their live shows.

An example of mixing film with live performance is that of Public Image Ltd. at the Ritz Riot in 1981. This club, located on the East 9th St in New York, had a state of the art video projection system. It was used to show a combination of prerecorded and live video on the club's screen. PiL played behind this screen with lights rear projecting their shadows on to the screen. Expecting a more traditional rock show, the audience reacted by pelting the projection screen with beer bottles and eventually pulling down the screen.

==== Technological developments ====
An artist retreat in Owego New York called Experimental Television Center, founded in 1971, made contributions to the development of many artists by gathering the experimental hardware created by video art pioneers: Nam June Paik, Steve Rutt and Bill Etra, and made the equipment available to artists in an inviting setting for free experimentation. Many of the outcomes debuted at the nightclub Hurrah which quickly became a new alternative for video artists who could not get their avant garde productions aired on regular broadcast outlets. Similarly, music video development was happening in other major cities around the world, providing an alternative to mainstream television.

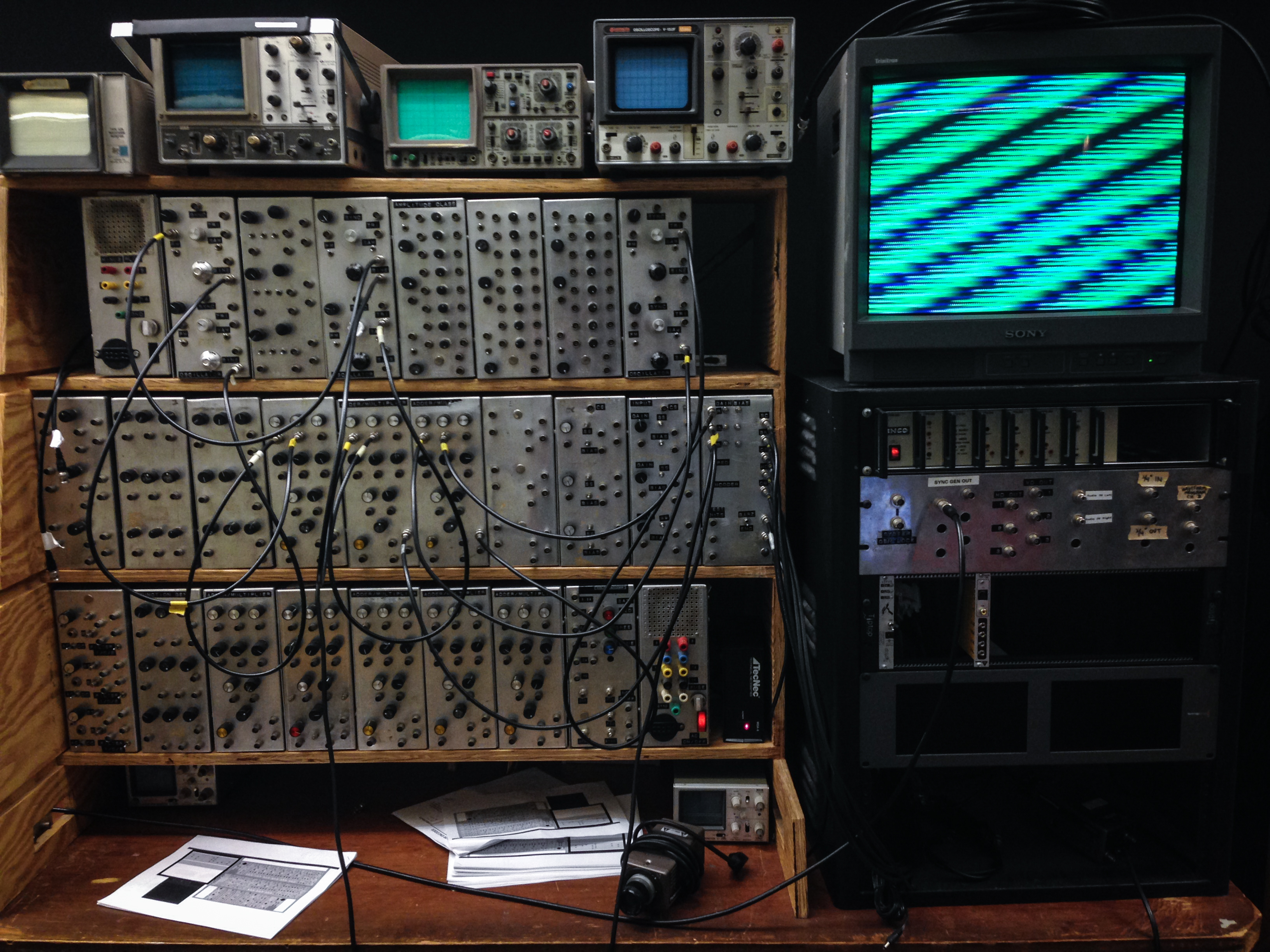
Sandin Image Processor, exhibited at School of the Art Institute of Chicago (SAIC)

A notable image processor is the Sandin Image Processor (1971), primarily as it describes what is now commonly referred to as open source.

The Dan Sandin Image Processor, or "IP," is an analog video processor with video signals sent through processing modules that route to an output color encoder. The IP's most unique attribute is its non-commercial philosophy, emphasizing a public access to processing methods and the machines that assist in generating the images. The IP was Sandin's electronic expression for a culture that would "learn to use High-Tech machines for personal, aesthetic, religious, intuitive, comprehensive, and exploratory growth." This educational goal was supplemented with a "distribution religion" that enabled video artists, and not-for-profit groups, to "roll-your-own" video synthesizer for only the cost of parts and the sweat and labor it took to build it. It was the "Heathkit" of video art tools, with a full building plan spelled out, including electronic schematics and mechanical assembly information. Tips on soldering, procuring electronic parts and Printed Circuit boards, were also included in the documentation, increasing the chances of successfully building a working version of the video synthesizer.

=== 1980s ===
==== Important events ====
In May 1980, multi media artist / filmmaker Merrill Aldighieri was invited to screen a film at the nightclub Hurrah. At this time, music video clips did not exist in large quantity and the video installation was used to present an occasional film. To bring the role of visuals to an equal level with the DJ's music, Merrill made a large body of ambient visuals that could be combined in real time to interpret the music. Working alongside the DJ, this collection of raw visuals was mixed in real time to create a non-stop visual interpretation of the music. Merrill became the world's first full-time VJ. MTV founders came to this club and Merrill introduced them to the term and the role of "VJ", inspiring them to have VJ hosts on their channel the following year. Merrill collaborated with many musicians at the club, notably with electronic musician Richard Bone to make the first ambient music video album titled "Emerging Video". Thanks to a grant from the Experimental Television Center, her blend of video and 16 mm film bore the influential mark of the unique Rutt Etra and Paik synthesizers. This film was offered on VHS through "High Times Magazine" and was featured in the club programming. Her next foray into the home video audience was in collaboration with the newly formed arm of Sony, Sony HOME VIDEO, where she introduced the concept of "breaking music on video" with her series DANSPAK. With a few exceptions like the Jim Carrol Band with Lou Reed and Man Parrish, this series featured unknown bands, many of them unsigned.

The rise of electronic music (especially in house and techno genres) and DJ club culture provided more opportunities for artists to create live visuals at events. The popularity of MTV lead to greater and better production of music videos for both broadcast and VHS, and many clubs began to show music videos as part of entertainment and atmosphere.

Joe Shannahan (owner of Metro in 1989–1990) was paying artists for video content on VHS. Part of the evening they would play MTV music videos and part of the evening they would run mixes from local artists Shanahan had commissioned.

Medusa's (an all-ages bar in Chicago) incorporated visuals as part of their nightly art performances throughout the early to mid 80s (1983–85). Also in Chicago during the mid-80s was Smart Bar, where Metro held "Video Metro" every Saturday night.

==== Technological developments ====
In the 1980s the development of relatively cheap transistor and integrated circuit technology allowed the development of digital video effects hardware at a price within reach of individual VJs and nightclub owners.

One of the first commercially distributed video synthesizers available in 1981 was the CEL Electronics Chromascope sold for use in the developing nightclub scene. The Fairlight Computer Video Instrument (CVI), first produced in 1983, was revolutionary in this area, allowing complex digital effects to be applied in real time to video sources. The CVI became popular amongst television and music video producers and features in a number of music videos from the period. The Commodore Amiga introduced in 1985 made a breakthrough in accessibility for home computers and developed the first computer animation programs for 2D and 3D animation that could produce broadcast results on a desktop computer.

=== 1990s ===
==== Important events ====
A number of recorded works begin to be published in the 1990s to further distribute the work of VJs, such as the Xmix compilations (beginning in 1993), Future Sound of London's "Lifeforms"(VHS, 1994), Emergency Broadcast Network's "Telecommunication Breakdown" (VHS, 1995),Coldcut and Hexstatic's "Timber" (VHS, 1997 and then later on CDRom including a copy of VJamm VJ software), the "Mego Videos" compilation of works from 1996 to 1998 (VHS/PAL, 1999) and Addictive TV's 1998 television series "Transambient" for the UK's Channel 4 (and DVD release).

In the United States, the emergence of the rave scene is perhaps to be credited for the shift of the VJ scene from nightclubs into underground parties. From around 1991 until 1994, Mark Zero would do film loops at Chicago raves and house parties. One of the earliest large-scale Chicago raves was "Massive New Years Eve Revolution" in 1993, produced by Milwaukee's Drop Bass Network. It was a notable event as it featured the Optique Vid Tek (OVT) VJs on the bill. This event was followed by Psychosis, held on 3 April 1993, and headlined by Psychic TV, with visuals by OVT Visuals. In San Francisco Dimension 7 were a VJ collective working the early West Coast rave scene beginning in 1993. Between 1996 and 1998, Dimension 7 took projectors and lasers to the Burning Man festival, creating immersive video installations on the Black Rock desert.

In the UK groups such as The Light Surgeons and Eikon were transforming clubs and rave events by combining the old techniques of liquid lightshows with layers of slide, film and video projections. In Bristol, Children of Technology emerged in 1991, pioneering interactive immersive environments stemming from co-founder Mike Godfrey's architectural thesis (The Leisure Reactor) whilst at University of Plymouth during the 1980s. Children of Technology integrated their homegrown CGI animation and video texture library with output from the interactive Virtual Light Machine (VLM), the brainchild of Jeff Minter and Dave Japp, with output onto over 500 sq m of layered screens using high power video and laser projection within a dedicated lightshow. Their "Ambient Theatre Lightshow" first emerged at Glastonbury 92 and they also provided VJ visuals for the Shamen, who had just released their no 1. hit "Ebeneezer Goode" at the festival. Invited musicians, Harvey Bainbridge, Hugh Lloyd-Langton and Mark Powell (of Esoteric Records) jammed in the Ambient Theatre Lightshow, using the VLM-0, within a prototype immersive environment. Children of Technology took interactive video concepts into a wide range of projects including show production for "Obsession" raves between 1992 and 1995, theatre, clubs, advertising, major stage shows and TV events. This included pioneering projects with 3D video / sound recording and performance, and major architectural projects in the late 1990s, where many media technology ideas were now taking hold. Another collective, "Hex" were working across a wide range of media - from computer games to art exhibitions - the group pioneered many new media hybrids, including live audiovisual jamming, computer-generated audio performances, and interactive collaborative instruments. This was the start of a trend which continues today with many VJs working beyond the club and dance party scene in areas such as installation art. Mike Godfrey also completed a wide range of architectural projects between 1985 and the present, some of which drew upon his lighting and multi-media experience, including Plymouth Dome (1985), Lakota Club, Bristol (1992-1993), National Marine Aquarium (1996-1998), Evolution exhibition Museum of Wales (1998).

The Japanese book VJ2000 (Daizaburo Harada, 1999) marked one of the earliest publications dedicated to discussing the practices of VJs.

==== Technological developments ====
The combination of the emerging rave scene, along with slightly more affordable video technology for home-entertainment systems, brought consumer products to become more widely used in artistic production. However, costs for these new types of video equipment were still high enough to be prohibitive for many artists.

There are three main factors that lead to the proliferation of the VJ scene in the 2000s:

1. affordable and faster laptops;
2. drop in prices of video projectors (especially after the dot-com bust where companies were loading off their goods on craigslist)
3. the emergence of strong rave scenes and the growth of club culture internationally

As a result of these, the VJ scene saw an explosion of new artists and styles. These conditions also facilitated a sudden emergence of a less visible (but nonetheless strong) movement of artists who were creating algorithmic, generative visuals.

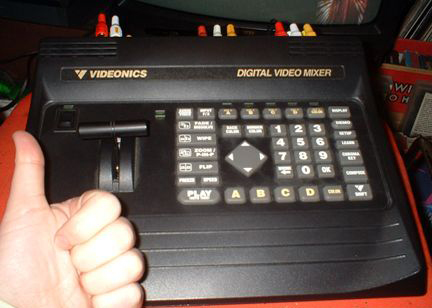
The Videonics MX-1 video mixer

This decade saw video technology shift from being strictly for professional film and television studios to being accessible for the prosumer market (e.g. the wedding industry, church presentations, low-budget films, and community television productions).These mixers were quickly adopted by VJs as the core component of their performance setups. This is similar to the release of the Technics 1200 turntables, which were marketed towards homeowners desiring a more advanced home entertainment system, but were then appropriated by musicians and music enthusiasts for experimentation. Initially, video mixers were used to mix pre-prepared video material from VHS players and live camera sources, and later to add the new computer software outputs into their mix. The 90s saw the development of a number of digital video mixers such as Panasonic's WJ-MX50, WJ-MX12, and the Videonics MX-1.

Early desktop editing systems such as the NewTek Video Toaster for the Amiga computer were quickly put to use by VJs seeking to create visuals for the emerging rave scene, whilst software developers began to develop systems specifically designed for live visuals such as O'Wonder's "Bitbopper".

The first known software for VJs was Vujak - created in 1992 and written for the Mac by artist Brian Kane for use by the video art group he was part of - Emergency Broadcast Network, though it was not used in live performances.EBN used the EBN VideoSampler v2.3, developed by Mark Marinello and Greg Deocampo. In the UK, Bristol's Children of Technology developed a dedicated immersive video lightshow using the Virtual Light Machine (VLM) called AVLS or Audio-Visual-Live-System during 1992 and 1993. The VLM was a custom built PC by video engineer Dave Japp using super-rare transputer chips and modified motherboards, programmed by Jeff Minter (Llamasoft & Virtual Light Co.). The VLM developed after Jeff's earlier Llamasoft Light Synthesiser programme. With VLM, DI's from live musicians or DJ's activated Jeff's algorithmic real-time video patterns, and this was real-time mixed using pansonic video mixers with CGI animation/VHS custom texture library and live camera video feedback. Children of Technology developed their own "Video Light" system, using hi-power and low-power video projection to generate real-time 3D beam effects, simultaneous with enormous surface and mapped projection. The VLM was used by the Shamen, The Orb, Primal Scream, Obsession, Peter Gabriel, Prince and many others between 1993 and 1996. A software version of the VLM was integrated into Atari's Jaguar console, in response to growing VJ interest. In the mid-90s, Audio reactive pure synthesis (as opposed to clip-based) software such as Cthugha and Bomb were influential.By the late 90s there were several PC based VJing software available, including generative visuals programs such as MooNSTER, Aestesis, and Advanced Visualization Studio, as well as video clip players such as FLxER, created by Gianluca Del Gobbo, and VJamm.

Programming environments such as Max/MSP, Macromedia Director and later Quartz Composer started to become used by themselves and also to create VJing programs like VDMX or pixmix. These new software products and the dramatic increases in computer processing power over the decade meant that VJs were now regularly taking computers to gigs.

=== 2000s ===
==== Important events ====
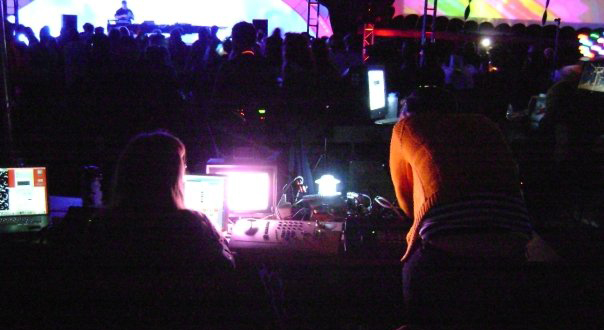
Two VJs collaborating on a mix at an outdoor electronic music festival

The new century has brought new dynamics to the practice of visual performance. To be a VJ previously had largely meant a process of self-invention in isolation from others: the term was not widely known. Then through the rise of internet adoption, having access to other practitioners very became the norm, and virtual communities quickly formed. The sense of collective then translated from the virtual world onto physical spaces. This becomes apparent through the numerous festivals that emerge all over Europe with strong focus on VJing.

===== VJ events in Europe =====
The VideA festival in Barcelona ran from 2000 to 2005. AVIT, clear in its inception as the online community of VJCentral.com self-organising a physical presence, had its first festival in Leeds (2002), followed by Chicago (2003), Brighton (2003), San Francisco (2004), and Birmingham (2005), 320x240 in Croatia (2003), Contact Europe in Berlin (2003). Also, the Cimatics festival in Brussels should be credited as a pioneering event, with a first festival edition in 2002 completely dedicated to VJing. In 2003, the Finnish media arts festival PixelAche was dedicated to the topic of VJing, while in 2003, Berlin's Chaos Computer Club started a collaboration with AVIT organisers that featured VJ Camps and Congress strands. LPM - Live Performers Meeting was born in Rome in 2004, with the aim to offer a real meeting space for often individually working artists, a place to meet the fellow VJ artists, spin-off new projects, and share all VJing related experiences, software, questions and insights. LPM since has become one of the leading international meetings dedicated to artists, professionals and enthusiasts of VJing, visual and live video performance, counting its 20th edition in 2019. Also around this time (in 2005 and 2007), UK artists Addictive TV teamed up with the British Film Institute to produce Optronica, a crossover event showcasing audiovisual performances at the London IMAX cinema and BFI Southbank.

Two festivals entirely dedicated to VJing, Mapping Festival in Geneva and Vision'R in Paris, held their first edition in 2005.As these festivals emerged that prominently featured VJs as headline acts (or the entire focus of the festival), the rave festival scene also began to regularly include VJs in their main stage lineups with varying degrees of prominence.

===== VJ events beyond Europe =====
The MUTEK festival (2000–present) in Montréal regularly featured VJs alongside experimental sound art performances, and later the Elektra Festival (2008–present) also emerged in Montréal and featured many VJ performances. In Perth, Australia, the Byte Me! festival (2007) showed the work of many VJs from the Pacific Rim area alongside new media theorists and design practitioners.

With lesser funding, the US scene has been host to more workshops and salons than festivals. Between 2000 and 2006, Grant Davis (VJ Culture) and Jon Schwark of Dimension 7 produced "Video Salon", a regular monthly gathering significant in helping establish and educate a strong VJ community in San Francisco, and attended by VJs across California and the United States. In addition, they produced an annual "Video RIOT!" (2003–2005) as a political statement following the R.A.V.E. Act (Reducing Americans' Vulnerability to Ecstasy Act) of 2003; a display of dissatisfaction by the re-election of George W. Bush in 2004; and in defiance of a San Francisco city ordinance limiting public gatherings in 2005.

Several VJ battles and competitions began to emerge during this time period, such as Video Salon's "SIGGRAPH VJ Battle" in San Diego (2003), Videocake's "AV Deathmatch" series in Toronto (2006) and the "VJ Contests" at the Mapping Festival in Geneva (2009). These worked much like a traditional DJ battle where VJs would be given a set amount of time to show off their best mixes and were judged according to several criteria by a panel of judges.

===== Publications =====
Databases of visual content and promotional documentation became available on DVD formats and online through personal websites and through large databases, such as the "Prelinger Archives" on Archive.org. Many VJs began releasing digital video loop sets on various websites under Public Domain or Creative Commons licensing for other VJs to use in their mixes, such as Tom Bassford's "Design of Signage" collection (2006), Analog Recycling's "79 VJ Loops" (2006), VJzoo's "Vintage Fairlight Clips" (2007) and Mo Selle's "57 V.2" (2007).

Promotional and content-based DVDs began to emerge, such as the works from the UK's ITV1 television series Mixmasters (2000–2005) produced by Addictive TV, Lightrhythm Visuals (2003), Visomat Inc. (2002), and Pixdisc, all of which focused on the visual creators, VJ styles and techniques. These were then later followed by NOTV, Atmospherix, and other labels. Mia Makela curated a DVD collection for Mediateca of Caixa Forum called "LIVE CINEMA" in 2007, focusing on the emerging sister practice of "live cinema". Individual VJs and collectives also published DVDs and CD-ROMs of their work, including Eclectic Method's bootleg video mix (2002) and Eclectic Method's "We're Not VJs" (2005), as well as eyewash's "DVD2" (2004) and their "DVD3" (2008).

Books reflecting on the history, technical aspects, and theoretical issues began to appear, such as "The VJ Book: Inspirations and Practical Advice for Live Visuals Performance" (Paul Spinrad, 2005), "VJ: Audio-Visual Art and VJ Culture" (Michael Faulkner and D-Fuse, 2006), "vE-jA: Art + Technology of Live Audio-Video" (Xárene Eskandar [ed], 2006), and "VJ: Live Cinema Unraveled" (Tim Jaeger, 2006). The subject of VJ-DJ collaboration also started to become a subject of interest for those studying in the field of academic human–computer interaction (HCI).

==== Video Scratching ====
In 2004, Pioneer released the DVJ-X1 DVD player, which allowed DJ's to scratch and manipulate videos like vinyl. In 2006 Pioneer released a successor unit, DVJ-1000, with similar functionality. Those video players have inspired DJ software makers to add video plugins to their software. The first example of this was Numark Virtual Vinyl, released in 2007, which had this option available. In 2008, Serato Scratch Live received the same option, called Video-SL. This allowed turntable manipulations of videos, and added more options to the Rane TTM-57SL mixer.

==== Technological developments ====
The availability and affordability of new consumer-level technology allowed many more people to get involved into VJing. The dramatic increase in computer processing power that became available facilitated more compact, yet often more complex setups, sometimes allowing VJs to bypass using a video mixer, using powerful computers running VJ software to control their mixing instead. However, many VJs continue to use video mixers with multiple sources, which allows flexibility for a wide range of input devices and a level of security against computer crashes or slowdowns in video playback due to overloading the CPU of computers due to the demanding nature of realtime video processing.

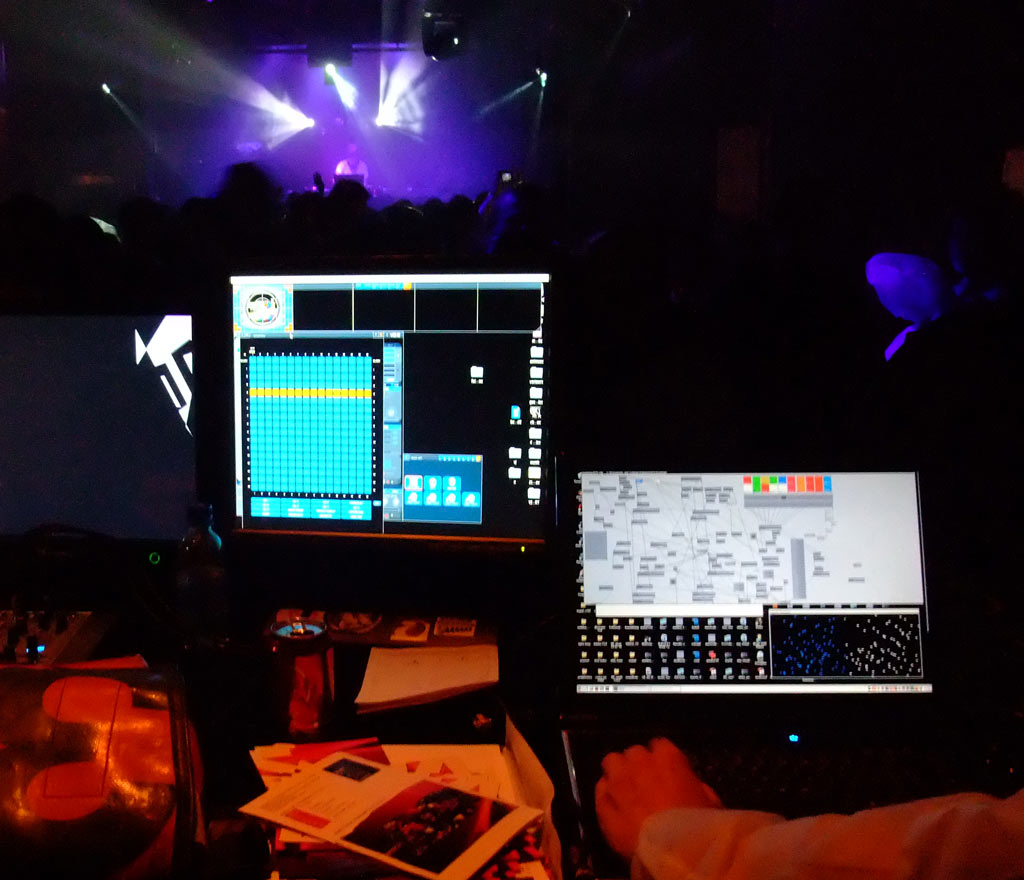
VJing with Pure Data

VJs use a wide choice of commercial products, covering every aspect of visuals performance, including video sample playback (such as Korg Kaptivator), real-time video effects (such as Korg Entrancer) and 3D visual generation.

The widespread use of DVDs gave initiative for scratchable DVD players.

Many new models of MIDI controllers became available during the 2000s, which allow VJs to use controllers based on physical knobs, dials, and sliders, rather than interact primarily with the mouse/keyboard computer interface.

There are also many VJs working with experimental approaches to working with live video. Open source graphical programming environments (such as Pure Data) are often used to create custom software interfaces for performances, or to connect experimental devices to their computer for processing live data (for example, the IBVA EEG-reading brainwave unit, the Arduino microprocessor, or circuit bending children's toys).

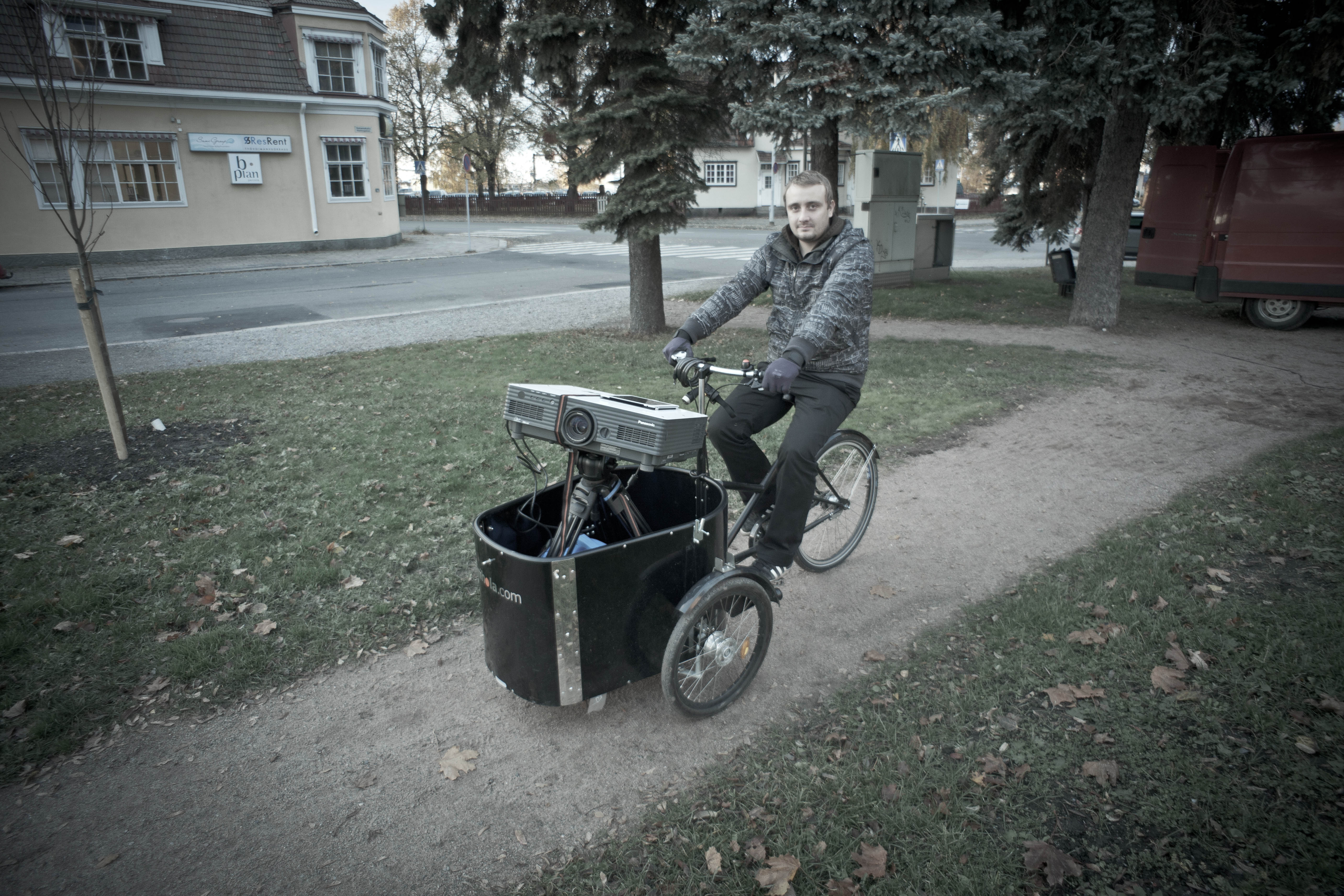
Guerilla VJ bike - setup for DIY outdoor projection

The second half of this decade also saw a dramatic increase in display configurations being deployed, including widescreen canvases, multiple projections and video mapped onto the architectural form. This shift has been underlined by the transition from broadcast based technology - fixed until this decade firmly in the 4x3 aspect ratio specifications NTSC and PAL - to computer industry technology, where the varied needs of office presentation, immersive gaming and corporate video presentation have led to diversity and abundance in methods of output. Compared to the ~640x480i fixed format of NTSC/PAL, a contemporary laptop using DVI can output a great variety of resolutions up to ~2500px wide, and in conjunction with the Matrox TripleHead2Go can feed three different displays with an image coordinated across them all.

== Common technical setups ==
A significant aspect of VJing is the use of technology, be it the re-appropriation of existing technologies meant for other fields, or the creation of new and specific ones for the purpose of live performance. The advent of video is a defining moment for the formation of the VJ (video jockey).

Often using a video mixer, VJs blend and superimpose various video sources into a live motion composition. In recent years, electronic musical instrument makers have begun to make specialty equipment for VJing.

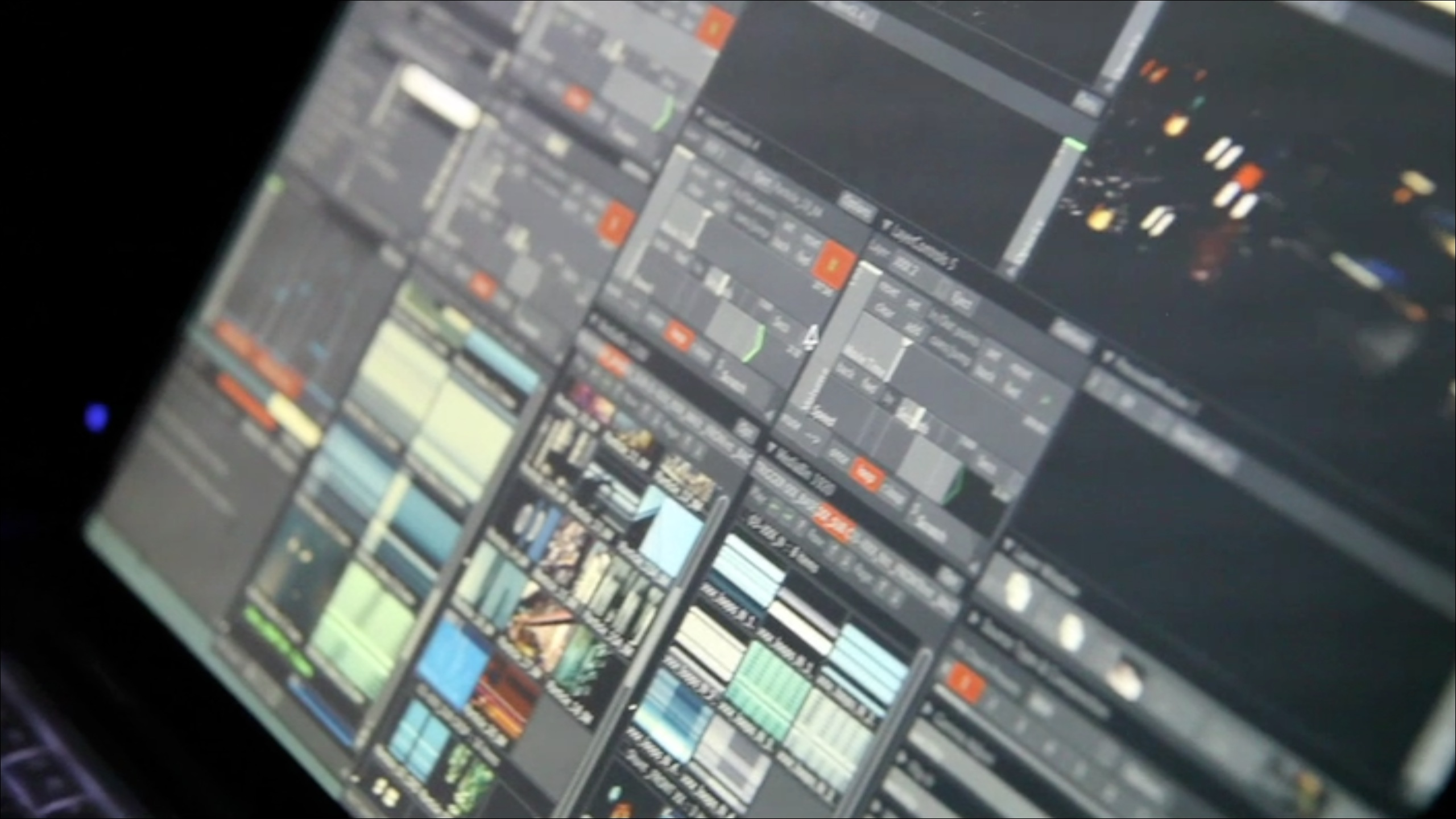
Customized VDMX Interface

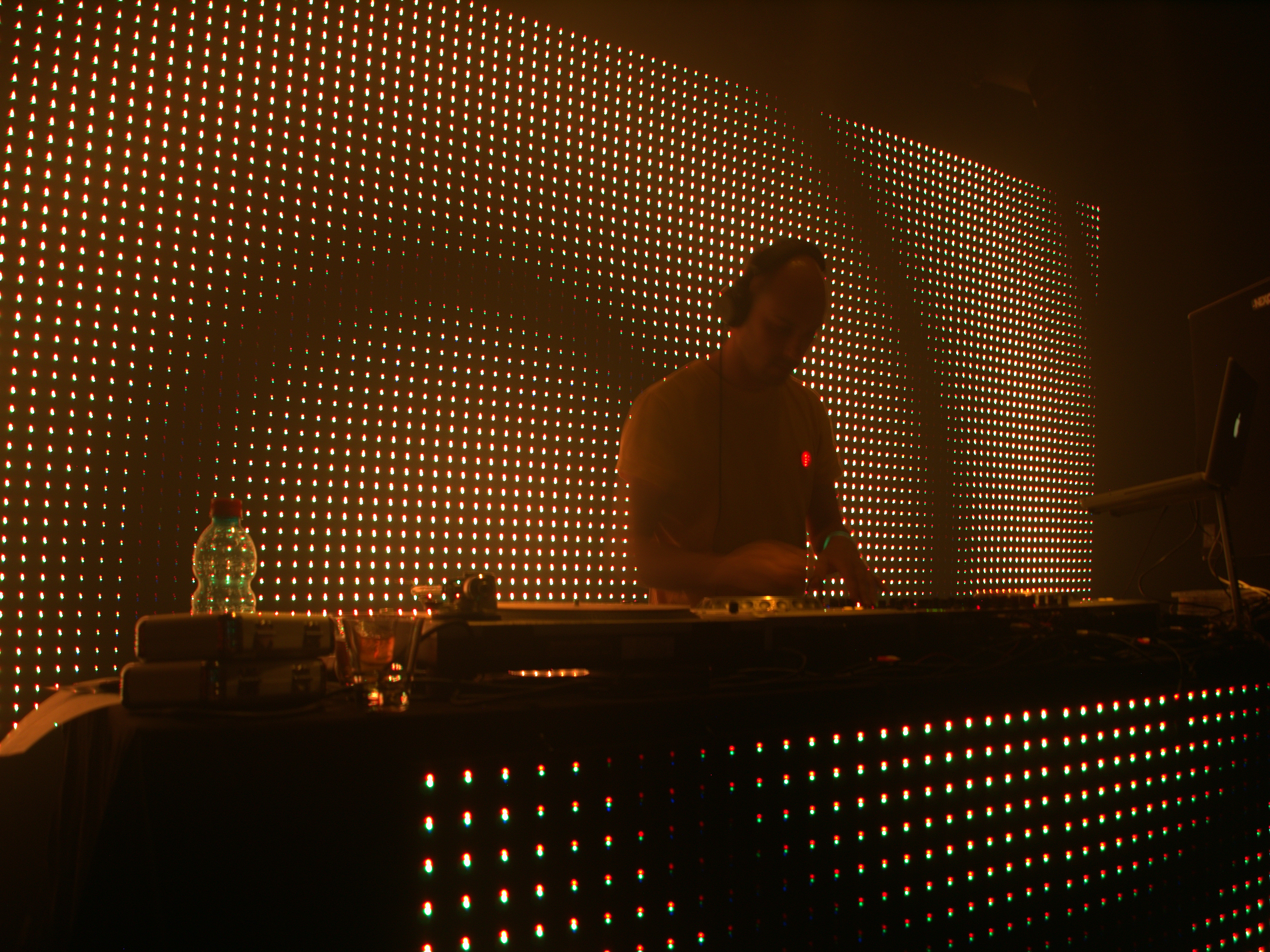
LED wall display surrounding DJ on stage

VJing developed initially by performers using video hardware such as videocameras, video decks and monitors to transmit improvised performances with live input from cameras and even broadcast TV mixed with pre-recorded elements. This tradition lives on with many VJs using a wide range of hardware and software available commercially or custom made for and by the VJs.

VJ hardware can be split into categories -

- Source hardware generates a video picture which can be manipulated by the VJ, e.g. video cameras and Video Synthesizers.
- Playback hardware plays back an existing video stream from disk or tape-based storage mediums, e.g. VHS tape players and DVD players.
- Mixing hardware allows the combining of multiple streams of video e.g. a video mixer or a computer utilizing VJ software.
- Effects hardware allows the adding of special effects to the video stream, e.g. Colour Correction units
- Output hardware is for displaying the video signal, e.g. Video projector, LED display, or Plasma Screen.

There are many types of software a VJ may use in their work, traditional NLE production tools such as Adobe Premiere, After Effects, and Apple's Final Cut Pro are used to create content for VJ shows. Specialist performance software is used by VJs to play back and manipulate video in real-time.

VJ performance software is highly diverse, and include software which allows a computer to replace the role of an analog video mixer and output video across extended canvasses composed of multiple screens or projectors. Small companies producing dedicated VJ software such as Modul8 and Magic give VJs a sophisticated interface for real-time processing of multiple layers of video clips combined with live camera inputs, giving VJs a complete off the shelf solution so they can simply load in the content and perform. Some popular titles which emerged during the 2000s include Resolume, NuVJ.

Some VJs prefer to develop software themselves specifically to suit their own performance style. Graphical programming environments such as Max/MSP/Jitter, Isadora, and Pure Data have developed to facilitate rapid development of such custom software without needing years of coding experience.

=== Sample workflows ===
There are many types of configurations of hardware and software that a VJ may use to perform.

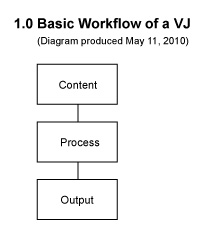
This image shows the basic conceptual workflow for a VJ.

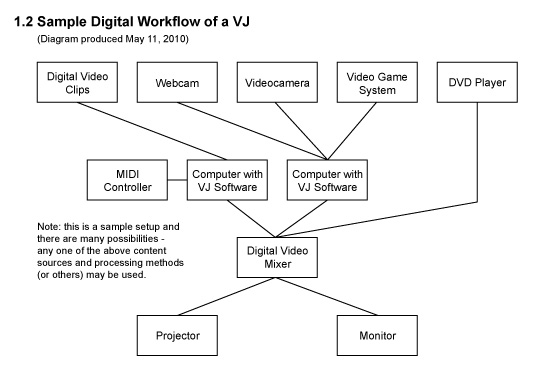
This image shows a sample setup of how a VJ may set up a digital VJ workflow.

== Research and reflective thinking ==
Several research projects have been dedicated to the documentation and study of VJing from the reflective and theoretical point of view. Round tables, talks, presentations and discussions are part of festivals and conferences related to new media art, such as ISEA and Ars Electronica for example, as well as specifically related to VJing, as is the case of the Mapping Festival. Exchange of ideas through dialogue contributed to the shift of the discussion from issues related to the practicalities of production to more complex ideas and to the process and the concept. Subjects related to VJing are, but not exclusively: identity and persona (individual and collective), the moment as art, audience participation, authorship, networks, collaboration and narrative. Through collaborative projects, visual live performance shift to a field of interdisciplinary practices.

Periodical publications, online and printed, launched special issues on VJing. This is the case of AMinima printed magazine, with a special issue on Live Cinema (which features works by VJs), and Vague Terrain (an online new media journal), with the issue The Rise of the VJ.

== See also ==
- Culture jamming
- Datamoshing
- Found footage
- Glitch art
- Live event visual amplification
- List of music software
- Mashup (video)
- Music visualization
- New media art
- New Media art festivals
- Remix culture
- Scratch Video
- Video art
- Video scratching
- Video synthesizer
- Vidding
- VJ (media personality)
- VJ Hypnotica
- TouchDesigner
