= ArKaos =

Computer program for live visual performance

- Developer: ArKaos s.a.
- Stable release: 3.6.5
- Operating system: Mac OS X, Windows
- Type: live visual performance
- License: Proprietary
- Website: www.arkaos.net

ArKaos is an application for live visual performance, conceived as a visual sampler for video loops that can be triggered from the computer, or through a hardware interface. The application is available in two versions: ArKaos VJ MIDI, conceived as a live video performance instrument, often used in conjunction with a MIDI keyboard, and ArKaos VJ DMX (a "media server software"), which can be controlled with a DMX console (DMX512 is a communication standard used for stage lighting devices).

ArKaos is also known for use in the Daftendirektour, a tour led by the band Daft Punk.

== Kling-Net ==
In 2011, ArKaos introduced the Kling-Net protocol, used for lighting control and Remote Device Management (RDM). It aims to provide video professionals the ability to distribute real-time video data to LED strips, LED panels and other remote devices over Ethernet. Together with Art-Net, it is one of the most commonly used lighting control and Remote Device Management (RDM) protocols.

== Functions and Advantages ==
Kling-Net automatically configures and connects display devices to a computer, media server or console. This means that “intelligence” is added to LED devices, enabling them to talk directly to the server or console, without the user's input.

The main benefit of this approach is that it eliminates the complexity of networking and control issues, thereby reducing the need for technical knowledge of the user. It also allows the creation of an heterogenic network of display devices from different manufacturers, which can all be controlled from one computer.

== Autoconfiguration ==
The autoconfiguration capabilities of Kling-Net ensure that many different devices can be controlled by the same media server. This avoids creating and matching the profiles of media server and individual device.

Kling-Net automatically detects and configures LED devices when initiated and sends the devices' resolution and pixel formats to the media server, which reads and changes the device parameters where necessary. Once registered to the media server, the device will start to receive the real-time video data as it is mapped onto the media server screen by the user, clipping and transforming the image to the correct pixel formats and minimising the need for user input.

Furthermore, because most of the work is done by the media server, the video easily reaches 60 FPS.

== Fixture Compatibility ==
Kling-Net was developed to function with nearly all manufacturers’ LED products, using a source code that adds an intelligence to LED devices, which allows control and integration.

== See also ==
- VJing
