= Addictive TV =

British musical group

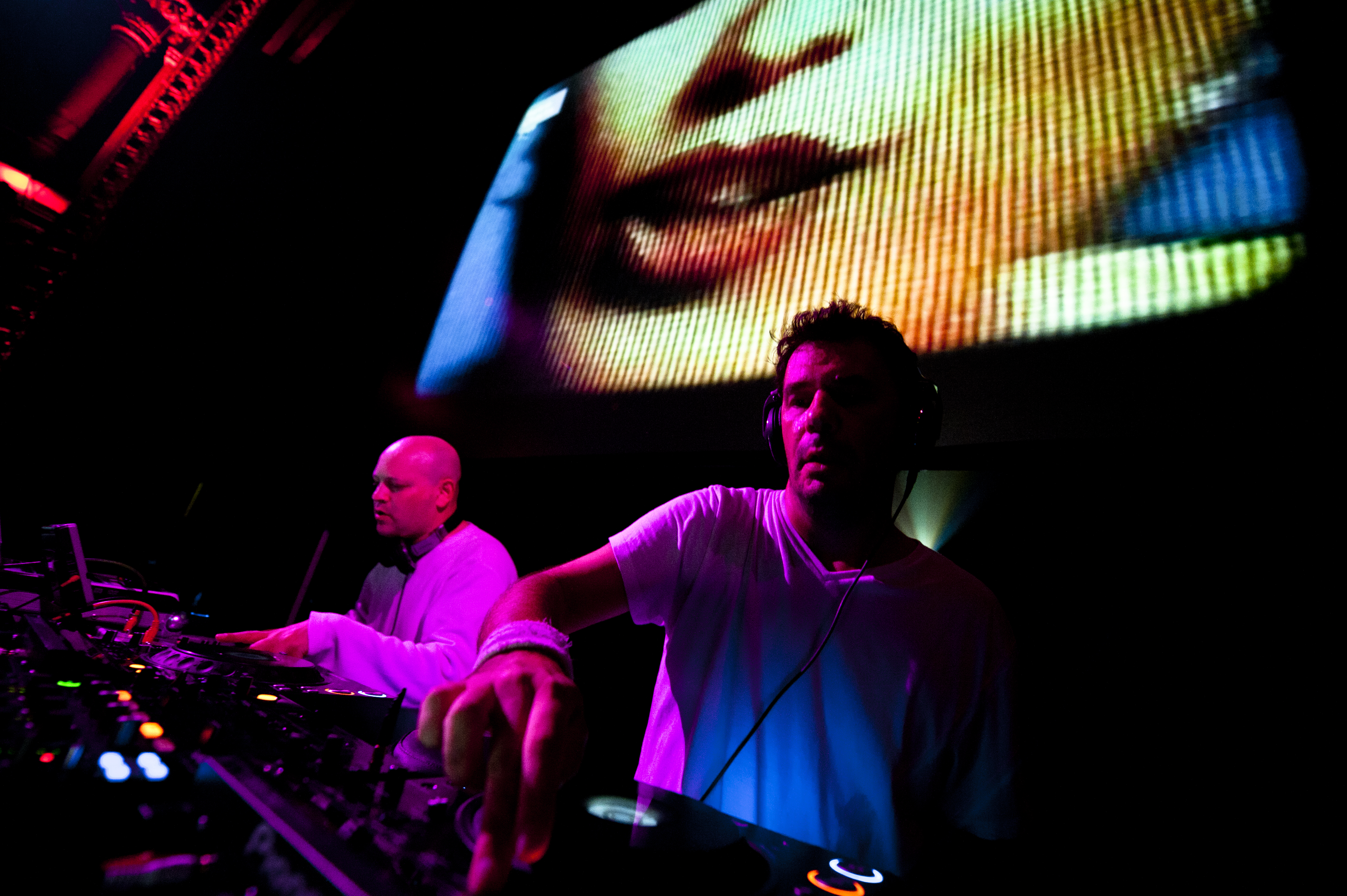

Background information
- Origin: London, United Kingdom
- Genres: Electronica, audiovisual, trip hop, breakbeat, drum and bass, world music
- Years active: 1992–present
- Labels: Studio !K7, Moonshine Music
- Members: Graham Daniels; Mark Vidler
- Past members: Tolly
- Website: Addictive.tv, Orchestra of Samples

Addictive TV are an English electronic music group. They are digital artists known for their movie supercuts and creation of audiovisual remix material, sampling movies and TV. After a number of years recording and filming musicians around the world, in 2017 they signed with German label !K7 to release the album of their Orchestra of Samples project, fusing electronic and world music. Based in London, the group comprises Graham Daniels and Mark Vidler (aka Go Home Productions). From 2000 to 2005 they produced the DJ:VJ music television series Mixmasters, and in DJMags 2006 annual poll, Addictive TV were voted #1 VJ in the world for a second time - the first being 2004.

Having released several DVD albums in the United States and the 2014 audio/visual project Orchestra of Samples, Addictive TV have performed in over 50 countries including at Glastonbury Festival, Roskilde Festival, WOMAD World of Music, Arts and Dance and the San Francisco Film Festival.

== History ==
=== 1990s ===
From 1992 to 2005 Addictive produced at least three series broadcast on mainstream TV in the UK; Transambient for Channel 4 in 1998, and, from 1992 to 1998, Night Shift was produced and partially networked by London broadcaster LWT. From 2000 to 2005 they produced the DJ/VJ music series Mixmasters for the ITV1 network.

=== 2000-10 ===
From 2001 to 2005, Addictive TV were signed to US label Moonshine Music, releasing nine DVD compilation albums of their Mixmasters and Transambient projects. They have also released through Naive in France, Absolut via Universal Music Group in Germany and both Pinnacle and Pias in the UK and now worldwide with Studio !K7.

The UK producers and audiovisual artists are the team who ran Optronica the visual music and VJ events held at the NFT and British Film Institute IMAX in London, UK in 2005 and 2007. In 2006 in the international publication DJMag annual poll, Addictive TV were voted #1 VJs in the world for a second time (the first being in 2004 in the magazine's first ever VJ poll alongside their Top 100 DJ poll). In the five years the poll ran, Addictive TV were the only act to stay in the top 3 positions.

Addictive TV are known for their bootleg film remixes, and in 2006 became the first group to officially remix a Hollywood film, reworking New Line Cinema's dance-centric Take the Lead into an audiovisual viral video. In 2006 they also worked on Snakes on a Plane, remixing the film for its TV commercials. Also in 2006, they performed at SIGGRAPH '06 - the world largest digital arts event. Then in 2008 they cut a remix for Paramount and Marvel's Iron Man film.

In 2005 Mark Vidler aka Go Home Productions joined Graham Daniels as part of Addictive TV when former partner Tolly left to start a family. In 2008 they were asked to remix the Beijing Olympics live for television, with Austrian broadcaster ORF as part of an IOC sanctioned and EU funded project looking at new forms of television. In this context their video "Sportive" was released on the DVD "Talents Art Video Collection" (edited by Joanna Chevalier, Paris) together with artists like Virginie Yassef and Franz Wanner. In 2009, they created official remixes of Oscar-winning Slumdog Millionaire for film company Pathé and Vin Diesel movie Fast & Furious for Universal as alternative trailers. In 2009 Graham fell off the stage at the Razzmatazz venue in Barcelona, Spain, breaking his leg.

=== 2010-present ===
Addictive TV have performed in over 50 countries in venues from the Pompidou Centre in Paris, the Royal National Theatre in London and the Museum of Contemporary Art Shanghai to festivals like Glastonbury Festival, Roskilde Festival and the San Francisco Film Festival in the US.

2010 saw them play the opening of the Cultural Olympiad with Mike Relm for the Vancouver 2010 Winter Olympics. Also in 2010 they supported Sengalise star Youssou N'Dour at Sfinks Festival and later that year traveled to Senegal to film and record West Africa musicians working with both him and Baaba Maal, including notable tama drummer Samba Diop. Still working on their project Orchestra of Samples, in 2011 they filmed and recorded sessions in Brazil with Viola virtuoso and Latin Grammy winner Mazinho Quevedo and in Tunisia with percussionist Seifeddine Helal. In 2011 they played the opening of Fest2011 in Paulinia, Brazil, supporting Brazilian rock artist Rita Lee (Os Mutantes). The same year, along with artists Arnaud Rebotini (Black Strobe) they formed the line-up of the record breaking largest ever 'silent disco' in the world (over 10,000 with headphones) in Grenoble, France organized by Cabaret Frappé in partnership with SilentArena France.

In 2012 they performed at the Royal National Theatre for the London 2012 Festival and also created the launch commercial for Capcom's Street Fighter X Tekken video game and were also part of The Gadget Show Live 2012 event at the UK's National Exhibition Centre.

In 2016 the duo performed in China in the Bird Nest Beijing National Stadium for the opening of the Global Mobile Internet Conference and in the same year formed part of the team organizing London's Splice Festival, the UK's only festival focusing on audiovisual performing arts. In 2017, they released their Orchestra of Samples project as an album, bringing together musicians from all over the world. During their 2017 UK tour, ex-Addictive TV member Tolly joined the band for one night only, performing at Norwich Arts Centre on Orchestra of Samples.

== Equipment ==
As artists, in 2003, working closely with the R&D area of Japanese manufacturer Pioneer Electronics they became the first to have the Pioneer DVJ video turntable, becoming instrumental in the development of Pioneer's new audiovisual equipment, including the Pioneer DVJ-X1 released in 2004, the SVM-1000 mixer and the DVJ-1000 turntable released in 2006.

In 2012 Addictive TV began using a whole new performance set-up designed by Dutch software designers Resolume integrating their software Arena with Native Instruments DJ software Traktor. The new set-up was unveiled at 2012's Amsterdam Dance Event electronic music conference.

== Discography ==
=== Albums ===
- 2000: Transambient
- 2001: Spaced Out
- 2002–2005: Mixmasters #1 - #5
- 2005: Audiovisualize
- 2017: Orchestra of Samples (Studio !K7)

=== Audio/video projects ===
- 2014: Orchestra of Samples
