= Seven Lions discography =

- EPs: 8
- Singles: 30
- Remixes: 16

The discography of American DJ and dubstep producer Seven Lions consists of two studio albums, eight extended plays, thirty singles and sixteen remixes.

== Extended plays and albums ==
List of extended plays and albums by Seven Lions, showing selected details and chart positions
Title	Release details	Peak chart positions		
Title	Release details	US	US Dance	US Heat
Polarize	Released: April 23, 2012; Label: Viper Recordings; Format: Digital download	—	—	—
Days to Come	Released: October 16, 2012; Label: Owsla; Format: Digital download	—	10	13
Worlds Apart	Released: April 29, 2014; Label: Casablanca; Format: Digital download	76	2	—
The Throes of Winter	Released: March 3, 2015; Label: Casablanca; Format: Digital download	143	3	1
Creation	Released: March 25, 2016; Label: Casablanca; Format: Digital download	—	1	—
Where I Won't Be Found	Released: June 26, 2017; Label: Seeking Blue; Format: Vinyl, digital download	—	25	—
Start Again	Released: August 24, 2018; Label: Ophelia; Format: Digital download	—	—	—
Ophelia Volume 1	Released: March 22, 2019; Label: Ophelia; Format: Vinyl, digital download^{^{1}}	—	—	—
Find Another Way	Released: March 27, 2020; Label: Ophelia; Format: Digital download	—	—	—
1999	Released: February 5, 2021; Label: Ophelia; Format: Vinyl, digital download	—	—	—
Ophelia Volume 2	Released: October 8, 2021; Label: Ophelia; Format: Vinyl, digital download	—	—	—
Opus (with Atlys)	Released: December 22, 2021; Label: Ophelia; Format: Digital download	—	—	—
See You Again (with Jason Ross)	Released: January 7, 2022; Label: Ophelia; Format: Digital download	—	—	—
10 Years of Seven Lions	Released: June 10, 2022; Label: Ophelia; Format: Digital download	—	—	—
Beyond the Veil	Released: October 21, 2022; Label: Ophelia; Format: Digital download	—	—	—
Asleep in the Garden of Infernal Stars	Released: December 14, 2025; Label: Ophelia; Format: Digital download	—	—	—
"—" denotes a recording that did not chart or was not released in that territory.

^{1}: The release date of digital download version is April 5, 2019.

== Singles ==
=== As lead artist ===
List of singles as a lead artist by Seven Lions
Year	Title	Chart peaks		Album	Release details
Year	Title	US Dance	US Air	Album	Release details
2011	"Luna"	—	—	Non-album singles	Independent (April 13, 2011)
2011	"Deep Divide"	—	—	Non-album singles	Independent (June 3, 2011)
2013	"Fevers" (featuring Minnesota and Mimi Page)	—	—	Non-album singles	Owsla (May 20, 2013)
2013	"Serpent of Old" (featuring Ciscandra Nostalghia)	—	—	Non-album singles	Owsla (Nov 18, 2013)
2013	"Strangers" (with Myon and Shane 54 featuring Tove Lo)	30	2	Worlds Apart	Republic Records (21 Aug 2013) / Casablanca (11 Oct 2013 )
2014	"Don't Leave" (featuring Ellie Goulding)	47	9	Worlds Apart	Casablanca (Apr 29, 2014)
2014	"Worlds Apart" (featuring Kerli)	—	—	Worlds Apart	Casablanca (Apr 29, 2014) / Ultra (Jun 3, 2014)
2014	"Lucy"	—	—	Non-album singles	Casablanca (Oct 27, 2014)
2014	"The Fall" (with Xilent)	—	—	Non-album singles	Owsla (Dec 2, 2014)
2015	"December" (with Davey Havok)	—	—	The Throes of Winter	Casablanca (Mar 3, 2015)
2015	"Lose Myself" (with Lynn Gunn)	—	—	The Throes of Winter	Casablanca (Mar 3, 2015)
2015	"A Way to Say Goodbye" (with Sombear)	—	—	The Throes of Winter	Casablanca (Mar 3, 2015)
2015	"Falling Away" (with Lights)	49	11	Creation	Casablanca Records (Aug 14, 2015)
2015	"Cusp"	—	—	Non-album singles	Who's Afraid of 138?! (Oct 2, 2015)
2016	"Rush Over Me" (with Illenium and Said the Sky featuring Haliene)	50	—	Non-album singles	Seeking Blue (Oct 10, 2016)
2016	"Cold Skin" (with Echos)	—	—	Non-album singles	Monstercat (Nov 9, 2016)
2017	"Higher Love" (with Jason Ross featuring Paul Meany)	—	—	Non-album singles	Anjunabeats (January 13, 2017)
2017	"Freesol" (featuring Skyler Stonestreet)	—	—	Where I Won't Be Found	Seeking Blue (April 10, 2017)
2017	"Where I Won't Be Found" (featuring NÉONHÈART)	—	—	Where I Won't Be Found	Seeking Blue (June 5, 2017)
2017	"Cold Hearted" (with Kill the Noise)	—	—	Non-album singles	Monstercat (Oct 25, 2017)
2018	"Calling You Home" (featuring Runn)	—	—	Ophelia Volume 1	Ophelia (Feb 16, 2018)
2018	"Ocean" (with Jason Ross featuring Jonathan Mendelsohn)	—	—	Ophelia Volume 1	Ophelia (March 30, 2018)
2018	"The Sirens" (with Jason Ross)	—	—	Ophelia Volume 1	Ophelia (March 30, 2018)
2018	"Horizon" (with Tritonal and Kill The Noise featuring Haliene)	—	—	Non-album singles	Enhanced Music / Ophelia (May 18, 2018)
2018	"Dreamin'" (featuring Fiora)	—	—	Start Again	Ophelia (July 13, 2018)
2018	"After Dark" (with Blastoyz featuring Fiora)	—	—	Start Again	Ophelia (August 10, 2018)
2018	"First Time" (with Slander and Dabin featuring Dylan Matthew)	41	—	Ophelia Volume 1	Ophelia (October 12, 2018)
2019	"Island" (with Wooli and Trivecta featuring Nevve)	—	—	Ophelia Volume 1	Ophelia (January 4, 2019)
2019	"Pathless Is the Way"	—	—	Ophelia Volume 1	Ophelia (March 22, 2019)
2019	"The Blood" (with Kill the Noise)	—	—	Non-album singles	Ophelia (March 29, 2019)
2019	"Sojourn" (with Crystal Skies)	—	—	Ophelia Volume 2	Ophelia (April 26, 2019)
2019	"See the End" (with Above & Beyond featuring Opposite The Other)	—	—	Non-album singles	Anjunabeats (July 26, 2019)
2019	"Break the Silence" (with MitiS featuring Rbbts)	—	—	Non-album singles	Ophelia (August 23, 2019)
2019	"Another Me" (with Excision and Wooli featuring Dylan Matthew)	46	—	Ophelia Volume 2 and Evolution EP	Ophelia (August 30, 2019)
2019	"Need Your Love" (with Gryffin and Noah Kahan)	—	—	Gravity	Darkroom / Geffen (October 4, 2019)
2019	"Known You Before" (with Jason Ross featuring Emilie Blandt)	—	—	1000 Faces	Ophelia (December 6, 2019)
2020	"Only Now" (featuring Tyler Graves)	33	—	Find Another Way	Ophelia (February 21, 2020)
2020	"Don't Wanna Fall" (with Last Heroes featuring Haliene)	—	—	Non-album singles	Ophelia (July 10, 2020)
2020	"Foolish of Me" (with Jason Ross and Crystal Skies featuring Jonathan Mendelsohn)	—	—	Non-album singles	Ophelia (October 23, 2020)
2021	"Shadows" (with Wooli and Amidy)	—	—	Non-album singles	Ophelia (April 30, 2021)
2021	"Wild and Broken" (with Trivecta and Blanke featuring Rbbts)	—	—	Non-album singles	Ophelia (June 4, 2021)
2021	"Returning to You" (with Andrew Bayer featuring Alison May)	—	—	Non-album singles	Ophelia (July 9, 2021)
2021	"Pantheon" (with Jason Ross, Trivecta, Wooli, Kill the Noise, Blastoyz, and Dimibo)	—	—	Ophelia Volume 2	Ophelia (October 1, 2021)
2022	"Without You" (with Kill the Noise featuring Julia Ross)	—	—	Embrace	Ophelia (February 25, 2022)
2022	"Reason For Fighting" (with Blastoyz featuring ERV ELLO)	—	—	Non-album singles	Ophelia (April 15, 2022)
2022	"Every Time" (featuring So Below)	—	—	Beyond the Veil	Ophelia (July 29, 2022)
2022	"Call On Me" (featuring Vancouver Sleep Clinic)	—	—	Beyond the Veil	Ophelia (September 2, 2022)
2022	"Stop Thinking" (featuring Lights)	48	—	Beyond the Veil	Ophelia (September 30, 2022)
2023	"Over Now" (with Above & Beyond featuring Opposite the Other)	—	—	Non-album singles	Anjunabeats (September 22, 2023)
2023	"Moonlight" (with Kill the Noise)	—	—	Non-album singles	Ophelia (October 18, 2023)
2023	"Darkness" (with Jason Ross featuring GG Magree)	—	—	Non-album singles	Ophelia (November 22, 2023)
2024	"Not Even Love" (with Illenium featuring ÁSDÍS)	14	—	Non-album singles	Casablanca (March 22, 2024)
2024	"Easy Lover" (featuring Hilda)	14	—	Non-album singles	Casablanca (June 21, 2024)
2025	"Man Down" (with YDG and Bella Renee)	—	—	Non-album singles	Ophelia (May 30, 2025)
"—" denotes a recording that did not chart or was not released in that territory.

=== As Abraxis ===
Singles by Abraxis (Seven Lions and Dimibo)
Year	Title	Album
2019	"Old Gods"	Non-album singles
2020	"Night Rider" (with Crystal Skies)	Non-album singles
2020	"Half of It"	Non-album singles
2021	"Black Rainbow"	Non-album singles

== Remixes ==
Selected remixes by Seven Lions, with label of track released
Year	Song	Artist	Label
2011	"Satellite"	Oceanlab	Anjunabeats
2011	"You Got to Go"	Above & Beyond (featuring Zoë Johnston)	Anjunabeats
2012	"Cosmic Love"	Florence and the Machine	Moshi Moshi
2012	"All I Know"	Matrix & Futurebound (featuring Luke Bingham)	Viper
2012	"On My Way to Heaven"	Above & Beyond (featuring Richard Bedford)	Anjunabeats
2012	"All Alone"	Superbus	Polydor
2012	"Still With Me"	Tritonal (featuring Cristina Soto)	Enhanced Music
2012	"I Don't Deserve You"	Paul Van Dyk (featuring Plumb)	Vandit Records
2012	"The Great Divide"	Velvetine	Anjunabeats
2012	"Days Turn Into Nights"	Delerium (featuring Michael Logan)	Nettwerk
2013	"Running to the Sea"	Röyksopp (featuring Susanne Sundfør)	Dog Triumph
2016	"Beautiful"	Ferry Corsten	Flashover Recordings
2016	"Fortress"	Illenium (featuring Joni Fatora)	A State of Trance
2017	"Omen in the Rain"	Myon (featuring Alissa Feudo)	Anjunabeats
2017	"The Paradox" (Remix with Dimibo)	Excision	Rottun Recordings
2019	"Sahara Love"	Above & Beyond (featuring Zoë Johnston)	Anjunabeats
2020	"Tokyo"	3lau	Anjunabeats
2021	"Rush Over Me" (1999 Remix)	Seven Lions, Illenium, and Said The Sky (featuring Haliene)	Ophelia

== Compilations ==
Selected compilation albums with Seven Lions tracks
Year	Tracks	Album	Artist(s)	Release details
2013	"Strangers"	The Mortal Instruments: City of Bones Soundtrack	Various	Republic (Aug 2013)
2014	"Strangers"	Now That's What I Call Music! 51	Various	Sony (Aug 5, 2014)
2016	"Cold Skin"	Monstercat 029 – Havoc	Various	Monstercat (Nov 18, 2016)
2017	"Cold Hearted"	Monstercat Uncaged Vol. 3	Various	Monstercat (Nov 10, 2017)
