= Excision discography =

Discography

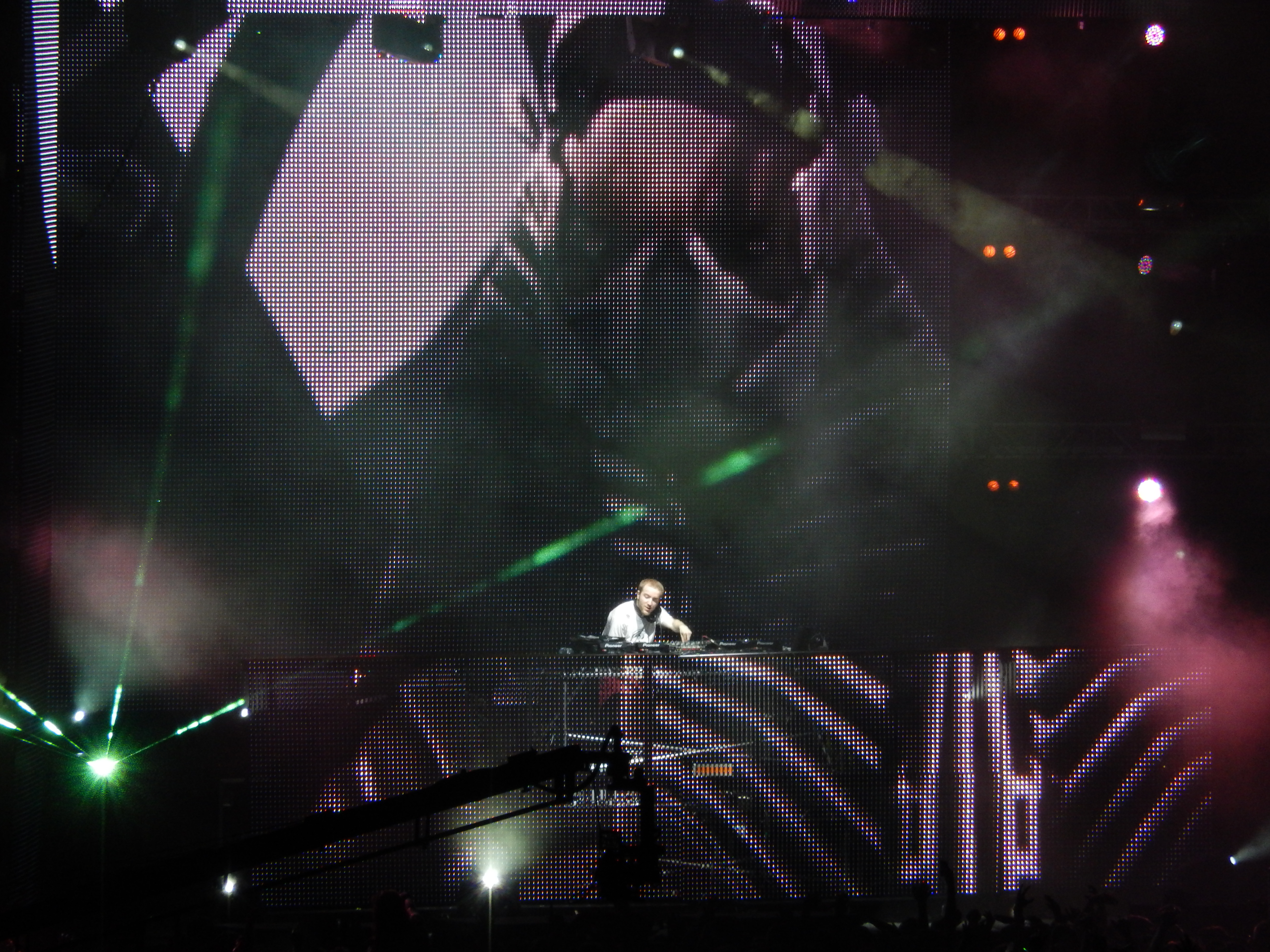
- Excision performing at Spring Awakening in 2013
- Studio albums: 3
- EPs: 5
- Compilation albums: 3
- Singles: 31
- Mixes: 12

The discography of Canadian electronic music producer Excision consists of four studio albums, three compilation albums, five extended plays, thirty-one singles, and twelve DJ mixes.

== Albums ==
=== Studio albums ===
Title	Album details	Peak chart positions		
Title	Album details	US Dance	US Heat	US Ind
X Rated	Released: October 10, 2011; Label: Mau5trap Recordings; Formats: Digital download, CD	23	—	—
Codename X	Released: February 3, 2015; Label: Rottun Recordings; Formats: Digital download, CD	3	5	26
Virus	Released: October 25, 2016; Label: Rottun Recordings; Formats: Digital download, CD, vinyl	2	4	26
Apex	Released: August 14, 2018; Label: Excision Music; Formats: Digital download	7	8	20
Onyx	Released: January 13, 2022; Label: Subsidia; Formats: Digital download	—	—	—
"—" denotes a recording that did not chart or was not released in that territory.

=== Compilation albums ===
Title	Album details	Peak chart positions	
Title	Album details	US Dance	US Heat
X Rated: The Remixes	Released: September 3, 2012; Label: Mau5trap Recordings; Formats: Digital download, CD	24	42
Codename X: The Remixes	Released: January 11, 2016; Label: Rottun Recordings; Formats: Digital download	—	—
Virus: The Remixes	Released: September 12, 2017; Label: Rottun Recordings; Formats: Digital download	—	—
"—" denotes a recording that did not chart or was not released in that territory.

== Extended plays ==
Title	Details
Boom (with Datsik and Flux Pavilion)	Released: 15 June 2009; Label: Rottun Recordings; Formats: Digital download
Hypothermic (with the SubDivision)	Released: 30 November 2009; Label: Paradise Lost; Formats: Digital download
Existence (with Downlink)	Released: 25 July 2011; Label: Rottun Recordings; Formats: Digital download
Breaking Through (with Dion Timmer)	Released: 21 June 2019; Label: Excision Music; Formats: Digital download
Evolution (with Wooli)	Released: 13 September 2019; Label: Excision Music; Formats: Digital download

== Singles ==
Title	Year	Charts	Album
Title	Year	US Dance	Album
"No Escape" (by Excision) / "Bug Powdah" (by Innasekt)	2008	—	Non-album singles
"Do It Now" (by Excision and Noiz) / "This Is War" (by Rakoon)	2008	—	Non-album singles
"Wasted" / "Serious Business"	2009	—	Non-album singles
"Yin Yang" (with DZ) / "Obvious"	2009	—	Non-album singles
"Swagga" (with Datsik) / "Invaders" (with Datsik)	2009	—	Non-album singles
"Know You" (by Excision) / "3vil Five" (by UltraBlack)	2009	—	Non-album singles
"Get to the Point" (with Liquid Stranger) / "One" (with Liquid Stranger)	2010	—	Non-album singles
"Aliens" (with Endophyte) / "Too Late"	2010	—	Non-album singles
"Subsonic" / "Force" (with Noiz)	2010	—	Non-album singles
"Heavy Artillery" (with Downlink featuring Messinian) / "Reploid" (with Downlink)	2010	—	Non-album singles
"Rude Symphony" / "Darkness" (with Subvert)	2011	—	Non-album singles
"Crowd Control" (with Downlink)	2011	—	Non-album singles
"Before the Sun" (with Downlink and ajapai)	2011	—	Non-album singles
"Brutal"	2012	—	Non-album singles
"Headbanga" (with Downlink)	2012	—	Non-album singles
"Destroid 1 Raise Your Fist" (with Downlink and Space Laces)	2012	50	The Invasion
"Vindicate" (with Datsik)	2013	—	Cold Blooded
"Destroid 9 Blast Off" (with ajapai)	2013	—	The Invasion
"Destroid 11 Get Stupid" (with Space Laces)	2013	—	The Invasion
"Rock You" (with Downlink)	2014	—	The Invasion
"Destroid 7 Bounce VIP" / "Destroid 10 Funk Hole VIP" (with Space Laces)	2014	—	The Invasion
"Night Shine" (with The Frim featuring Luciana)	2014	—	Codename X
"Bring the Madness" (with Pegboard Nerds featuring Mayor Apeshit)	2015	—	Codename X
"Robo Kitty" (with Downlink)	2015	—	Codename X
"Again & Again" (with Dion Timmer)	2015	—	Non-album singles
"Road Kill" (with Tech N9ne)	2015	—	Non-album singles
"Africa" (with Dion Timmer)	2016	—	Virus
"Final Boss" (with Dion Timmer)	2016	—	Virus
"Rumble" (with Space Laces)	2018	—	Non-album single
"Gold (Stupid Love)" (with Illenium featuring Shallows)	2018	19	Apex
"Another Me" (with Seven Lions and Wooli featuring Dylan Matthew)	2019	—	Non-album singles
"Feel Something" (with Illenium featuring I Prevail)	2020	8	Non-album singles
"Resistance" (with Downlink)	2020	—	Non-album singles
"Erase You" (with Wooli and Haliene)	2020	—	Non-album singles
"Necromancer" (with Dion Timmer)	2020	—	Non-album singles
"Your Fault" (with Slander featuring Elle Vee)	2020	—	Non-album singles
"The Last Time" (with Whales and Riell)	2021	—	Subsidia Dawn: Vol. 2
"Unbound" (with Sullivan King)	2021	—	To the Grave
"Bunker Buster" (with Subtronics)	2021	—	Non-album singles
"Back to Back" (with Ubur featuring Armanni Reign)	2021	—	Non-album singles
"Salvation" (with Dion Timmer featuring Alexis Donn)	2021	—	Non-album singles
"Broken Pieces" (with Dion Timmer featuring Monika Santucci)	2021	—	Arcane and Subsidia Dawn: Vol. 4
"Demisaur" (with Kai Wachi)	2021	—	Onyx
"End of the World" (with Dion Timmer featuring Donna Tella)	2022	—	Onyx
"Dimension"	2022	—	Lost Lands Compilation 2021
"Name Drop" (with Wooli)	2022	—	TBD EP
"Titans" (with Wooli)	2023	28	Non-album single
"Fall Apart" (with Sullivan King)	2023	—	Thrones of Blood
"Reasons" (with Wooli and The Devil Wears Prada)	2023	41	Non-album singles
"Together As One"	2024	—	Non-album singles
"Rapid Fire" (with Ganja White Night and Wooli and featuring Eksman)	2024	—	Sprouted
"Air" (with Gryffin featuring Julia Michaels)	2025	—	
"Adrenaline" (with Sullivan King featuring From Ashes to New)	2025	—	Raise the Dead - EP
"—" denotes a recording that did not chart or was not released in that territory.

== Mixes ==
Title	Details
Darkside Dubstep Mix	Released: 2006; Label: None (self-released); Formats: Digital download
Rottun Dubstep Mix	Released: 2007; Label: None (self-released); Formats: Digital download
Shambhala 2008 Mix	Released: August 17, 2009; Label: None (self-released); Formats: Digital download
Shambhala 2009 Mix	Released: August 20, 2009; Label: None (self-released); Formats: Digital download
Shambhala 2010 Mix	Released: December 7, 2010; Label: None (self-released); Formats: Digital download
Shambhala 2011 Mix	Released: September 28, 2011; Label: None (self-released); Formats: Digital download
The X Sessions: Vol. 1	Released: October 8, 2011; Label: None (self-released); Formats: Digital download
Shambhala 2012 Mix	Released: November 4, 2012; Label: None (self-released); Formats: Digital download
Shambhala 2013 Mix	Released: August 31, 2013; Label: None (self-released); Formats: Digital download
Shambhala 2014 Mix	Released: September 8, 2014; Label: None (self-released); Formats: Digital download
Shambhala 2015 Mix	Released: September 8, 2014; Label: None (self-released); Formats: Digital download
Shambhala 2015 Mix	Released: September 16, 2015; Label: None (self-released); Formats: Digital download
Shambhala 2016 Mix	Released: September 14, 2016; Label: None (self-released); Formats: Digital download
Lost Lands 2017 Mix	Released: November 28, 2017; Label: None (self-released); Formats: Digital download
Lost Lands 2018 Mix	Released: November 9, 2018; Label: None (self-released); Formats: Digital download
Lost Lands 2019 Mix	Released: December 6, 2019; Label: None (self-released); Formats: Digital download
