= Kill the Noise discography =

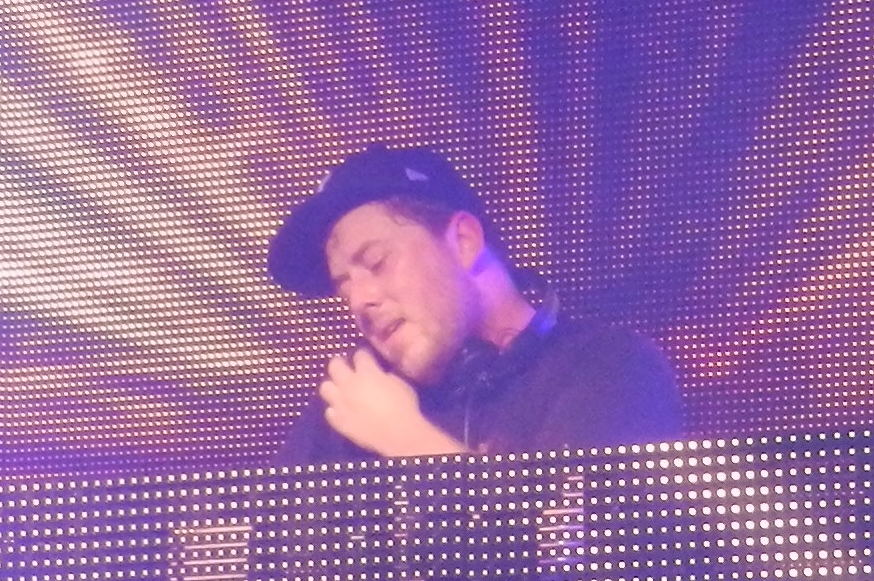
- Stanczak at the 2012 Spring Awakening Music Festival
- Studio albums: 3
- EPs: 4
- Compilation albums: 3
- Singles: 15
- Remixes: 34

This is the discography of American electronic music producer Kill the Noise. His discography consists of three studio albums, three remix albums, four extended plays, 15 singles, and 34 remixes.

== Albums ==
=== Studio albums ===
Title	Information	Peak chart positions		
Title	Information	US Dance	US Heat	US Ind.
Occult Classic	Released: 9 October 2015; Label: Owsla; Formats: Digital download, CD, vinyl	7	6	45
EMBRACƎ	Released: 31 March 2022; Label: Ophelia; Formats: Digital download, CD, vinyl	-	-	-
HOLLOW WORLD	Released: 25 August 2023; Label: Ophelia; Formats: Digital download, CD, vinyl	-	-	-

=== Remix albums ===
Title	Information	Charts
Title	Information	US Dance
Roots Remixed	Released: 24 July 2012; Label: Slow Roast Records; Formats: Digital download	—
Black Magic Remixes	Released: 3 September 2013; Label: OWSLA; Formats: Digital download	21
Alt Classic	Released: 13 May 2016; Label: OWSLA; Format: Digital download	24
"—" denotes a recording that did not chart or was not released in that territory.

== Extended plays ==
Title	Information	Peak chart positions			
Title	Information	US	US Dance	US Heat	US Ind.
Wun Nation (as Ewun)	Released: 2008; Label: Evol Intent; Formats: Digital download, vinyl	—	—	—	—
Roots	Released: 6 April 2010; Label: Slow Roast Records; Formats: Digital download	—	—	—	—
Kill Kill Kill	Released: 22 November 2011; Label: OWSLA; Formats: Digital download	—	—	—	—
Black Magic	Released: 6 November 2012; Label: OWSLA; Formats: Digital Download	172	7	4	26
"—" denotes a recording that did not chart or was not released in that territory.

== Singles ==
=== As lead artist ===
Title	Year	Peak chart positions									Album
Title	Year	AUS	CAN	CAN Dig	FRA	GER	UK	US Dance	US Dig	US Heat	Album
"Kill Kill Kill"	2008	—	—	—	—	—	—	—	—	—	Kill Kill Kill
"Lightspeed" (with Datsik)	2012	—	—	—	—	—	—	—	—	—	Non-album single
"Far Away" (with Feed Me)	2014	—	—	—	—	—	—	—	—	—	Non-album single
"Recess" (with Skrillex featuring Fatman Scoop and Michael Angelakos)	2014	47	59	30	189	79	57	13	7	15	Recess
"Louder" (with Tommy Trash featuring Rock City)	2015	—	—	—	—	—	—	—	—	—	Occult Classic
"Kill It 4 the Kids" (featuring Awolnation and Rock City)	2015	—	—	—	—	—	—	—	—	—	Occult Classic
"Dolphin on Wheels" (with Dillon Francis)	2015	—	—	—	—	—	—	—	—	—	Occult Classic
"Spitfire Riddim" (featuring twoton)	2015	—	—	—	—	—	—	—	—	—	Occult Classic
"Fuk Ur Mgmt"	2015	—	—	—	—	—	—	—	—	—	Occult Classic
"Cold Hearted" (with Seven Lions)	2017	—	—	—	—	—	—	—	—	—	Non-album singles
"Don't Give Up on Me" (with Illenium featuring Mako)	2018	—	—	—	—	—	—	—	—	—	Non-album singles
"Horizon" (with Seven Lions and Tritonal featuring Haliene)	2018	—	—	—	—	—	—	—	—	—	Non-album singles
"Shake The Ground" (with Snails featuring Sullivan King and Jonah Kay)	2018	—	—	—	—	—	—	—	—	—	Non-album singles
"The Blood" (with Seven Lions)	2019	—	—	—	—	—	—	—	—	—	Non-album singles
"Battlestations" (with Wolfgang Gartner)	2020	—	—	—	—	—	—	—	—	—	Non-album singles
"Pantheon" (with Seven Lions, Jason Ross, Trivecta, Wooli, Blastoyz, and Dimibo)	2021	—	—	—	—	—	—	—	—	—	Non-album singles
"Don't Look Back" (with Moelle)	2021	—	—	—	—	—	—	—	—	—	Embracǝ
"As Above So Below" (with Tasha Baxter and Bro Safari)	2022	—	—	—	—	—	—	—	—	—	Non-album single
"How Ya Like Me Now" (with Wolfgang Gartner featuring Ericka Guitron)	2022	—	—	—	—	—	—	—	—	—	Embracǝ
"Without You" (with Seven Lions featuring Julia Ross)	2022	—	—	—	—	—	—	—	—	—	Embracǝ
"—" denotes a recording that did not chart or was not released in that territory.

=== As featured artist ===
Title	Year	Peak chart positions									Certifications	Album
Title	Year	AUS	CAN	CAN Dig	CAN Rock	US	US Dance	US Dig	US Rap	US Rock	Certifications	Album
"Narcissistic Cannibal" (Korn featuring Skrillex and Kill the Noise)	2011	—	97	65	32	—	31	—	—	15		The Path of Totality
"Shell Shocked" (Juicy J, Wiz Khalifa and Ty Dolla Sign featuring Kill the Noise and Madsonik)	2014	14	—	67	—	84	—	45	17	—	RIAA: Gold	Teenage Mutant Ninja Turtles Soundtrack
"—" denotes a recording that did not chart or was not released in that territory.

== Guest appearances ==
Title	Year	Album
"Muscle Rollers" (Feed Me and Kill the Noise)	2010	Feed Me's Big Adventure
"Bring Out the Devil" (SOFI featuring Kill the Noise and Skrillex)	2011	Locked and Loaded: Part 2
"Fuels the Comedy" (Korn featuring Kill the Noise)	2011	The Path of Totality (Special Edition)
"Right on Time" (Skrillex with Kill the Noise and 12th Planet)	2011	Bangarang (EP)
"Burst" (12th Planet featuring Skrillex and Kill the Noise)"	2012	The End
"Dill the Noise" (Dillon Francis and Kill the Noise)	2012	Something, Something, Awesome.
"Divebomb" (Madsonik and Kill the Noise featuring Tom Morello)	2017	XXX: Return of Xander Cage Soundtrack
"Crazy Maybe" (Feed Me featuring Kill the Noise and Anjulie)	2017	Feed Me's Existential Crisis (EP)
"Ice Station Zero" (Bad Company UK, Mat Zo and Kill the Noise)	2018	Ice Station Zero

== Remixes ==
Title	Year	Original artist(s)	Album
"Circus"	2008	Britney Spears	Non-album singles
"Lo Sforzo"	2008	Ocelot	Non-album singles
"Can't Give You Up"	2008	Cryptonites	Non-album singles
"Call Me Up"	2008	Chromeo	Non-album singles
"American Boy" (featuring Kanye West)	2008	Estelle	American Boy
"Breakfast"	2008	Le Le	Breakfast (Remixes)
"All Too Vivid"	2008	VEGA	Non-album singles
"New Era"	2009	Retro Kidz	Non-album singles
"Pennies"	2009	Lady Sovereign	Non-album singles
"Mothers Talk"	2009	Tears For Fears	Non-album singles
"Right Hand Hi"	2010	Kid Sister	Right Hand Hi (Kill the Noise Remix)
"Never Will Be Mine" (featuring Robyn)	2011	Rye Rye	Never Will Be Mine (The Remixes)
"Talk Box"	2011	KOAN Sound	Funk Blaster
"Still Speedin'"	2011	Sway	Still Speedin'
"Growin' Up In the Gutter"	2011	Yelawolf	HTC X Squared #10
"Under and Over It"	2011	Five Finger Death Punch	Non-album single
"Spitfire"	2011	Porter Robinson	Spitfire
"Diplodocus"	2012	Noisia	Split the Atom (Special Edition)
"Must Be the Feeling"	2012	Nero	Must Be the Feeling (Remixes)
"Jokes on You"	2012	Kill the Noise	Roots Remixed
"Tornado" (featuring Polina)	2012	Tiësto and Steve Aoki	Tornado (Remixes)
"Ghosts In the Machine"	2013	The M Machine	Metropolis Remixed
"Thumbs Up"	2013	Kill the Noise and Feed Me	Black Magic Remixes
"NRG" (with Skrillex and Milo & Otis)	2014	Duck Sauce	NRG
"Turn Up"	2014	Gent and Jawns	Faded
"Freeway" (with Flux Pavilion)	2014	Flux Pavilion	Freeway Remixes
"Mountains and Molehills" (with Bro Safari featuring Turin Brakes)	2014	Flux Pavilion	Freeway Remixes
"Parental Advisory"	2015	GTA	Death to Genres Vol. 1.5 (Remixes)
"Propaganda"	2016	DJ Snake	Propaganda
"Drift and Fall Again" (featuring Lola Marsh)	2016	Madsonik	Criminal (Soundtrack)
"Without a Trace" (with Virtual Riot featuring Stalking Gia)	2016	Kill the Noise	Alt Classic
"I Do Coke" (with Feed Me as Snort & Leisure)	2016	Kill the Noise	Alt Classic
"Rip N Dip"	2016	Getter	Rip N Dip Remixes
"Like a Bitch"	2017	Zomboy	Neon Grave Remixed
"Only Want U"	2018	Snails and Nghtmre (featuring Akylla)	Non-album single
"Escape Room" (with Madsonik)	2019	Brian Tyler and John Carey	Escape Room (Original Motion Picture Soundtrack)
"Duality"	2019	Slipknot	Non-album singles
"Sixtysixty"	2020	Moody Good	Non-album singles
"Returning To You"	2021	Seven Lions and Andrew Bayer (featuring Alison May)	Returning To You (feat. Alison May) [Remixes]
