= Start Again (EP) =

EP by Seven Lions
- Released: August 24, 2018
- Genre: Dubstep
- Label: Ophelia Records
- Producer: Jeff Montalvo

Seven Lions chronology
Where I Won't Be Found (2017)	Start Again (2018)	Find Another Way (2019)

Start Again is the seventh extended play (EP) by American musician and record producer Seven Lions. It was released on 24 August 2018, via Ophelia Records, a label founded by Seven Lions. The extended play contains four tracks, all of which feature Australian singer-songwriter Fiora.

== Background ==
Start Again serves as Seven Lion's first solo extended play on his label Ophelia. He had previously collaborated with musician Jason Ross on Ocean, also released on Ophelia. It contains 4 tracks, each featuring Australian vocalist Fiora. The extended play's release date was revealed only a week before release, on the twenty-ninth episode of Above & Beyond's Group Therapy.

The EP features Seven Lion's signature style of melodic dubstep, as well as containing psytrance and ambient influences. "Start Again" is described as containing "sentimental, bittersweet melodies and gentle off-beat sways" by Dancing Astronaut. The EP's third track, "After Dark", was written in collaboration with Israeli producer Blastoyz.

Preceding the release of the EP, "Dreamin" and "After Dark" were released as separate singles. At the time of the EP's release, Seven Lions announced that he would be going on his The Journey 2 tour across North America. Start Again was followed by Find Another Way, which was released a year and a half later.

== Tracklist ==
No.	Title	Writer(s)	Length
1.	"Let Go" (featuring Fiora)	Jeff Montalvo	4:52
2.	"Start Again" (featuring Fiora)	Montalvo	5:34
3.	"After Dark" (with Blastoyz featuring Fiora)	Montalvo, Blastoyz	6:30
4.	"Dreamin" (featuring Fiora)	Montalvo	5:20

== Charts ==
Chart (2018)	Peak position
US Top Dance/Electronic Albums (Billboard)	8
