= MitiS =

- Born: Joseph Torre; January 16, 1991 (age 35); Media, Pennsylvania, U.S.
- Origin: Pennsylvania, U.S.
- Genres: Electronic music, melodic dubstep, trance, electro house, progressive house, future bass, drumstep
- Occupations: Music producer, DJ
- Instruments: Piano, D.A.W. (Ableton)
- Years active: 2010–present
- Labels: Ophelia, Seeking Blue
- Website: www.mitisofficial.com

Joseph Torre (born January 16, 1991), who goes by the stage name MitiS, is an American electronic dance music producer, DJ, and musician. He grew up in Pennsylvania, and trained as a classical pianist. He performed in Carnegie Hall in Manhattan, and the Kimmel Center in Philadelphia. Mitis is represented by Ophelia Records label and has also collaborated with artists such as Jason Ross and Seven Lions.

In February 2024, he released his third studio album, Unity, and is touring North America with support from EDM artists including: Blastoyz, Haliene, Nurko and Yetep.

Torre is married and has a son.

In addition to his SoundCloud account, it seems that MitiS created a side project called "Ruins". The similarity has been noticed by the listeners and not refuted by MitiS himself.

== Discography ==
=== Studio albums ===
- Til the End (2018) – reached number 4 on Billboard Dance/Electronic Album Sales chart.
- Lost (2021)
- Unity (2024)

=== Extended plays ===
- Living Color EP (2015)
- Born (2016)
- Foundations EP (2016)
- Moments (2017)
- Life of Sin Series (2019)
- Shattered (2019)
- All I Have (2020)
- Together (2022)
- Memories (2023)
