= Charlie Dodson =

Charlie Dodson can refer to:

- Charlie Dodson (motorcyclist), British racer (1901 - 1983)
- Charlie Dodson, minor character on Perry Mason (2020 TV series)
- Erwan, one of the Ganja White Night Belgian dubstep duo, real name Charlie Dodson
