= 1000 Faces =

1000 Faces may refer to:

- 1,000 Faces, an EP by Randy Montana
- 1000 Faces, an album by Jason Ross
