= Trivecta =

American dubstep producer

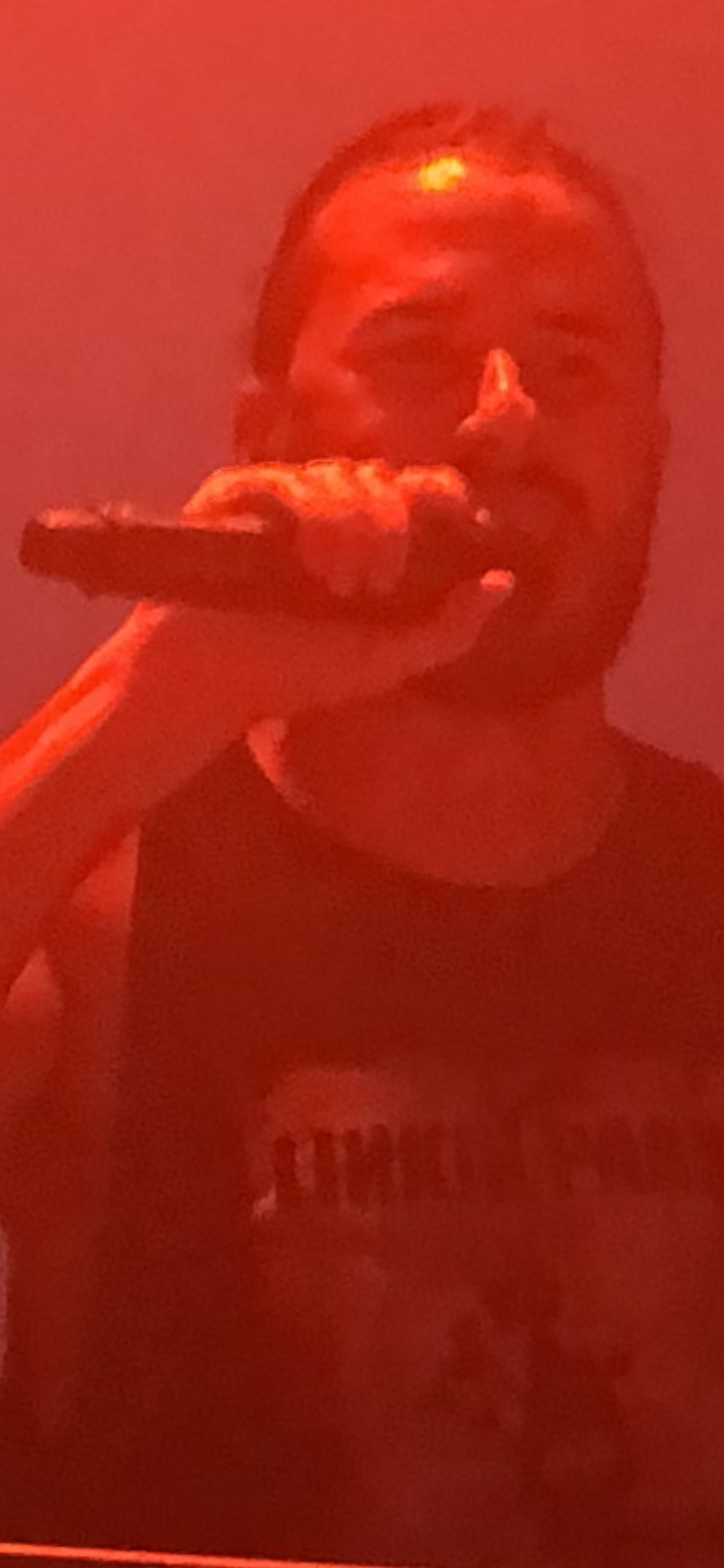
- Trivecta performing in Montreal (2022)

Background information
- Born: Sam Dobkin
- Genres: Dubstep; house; trance
- Years active: 2014-present
- Labels: Monstercat; Ophelia; Thrive Music

Samuel Harrison "Sam" Dobkin, known by his stage name Trivecta, is an electronic dance music artist and DJ from Tampa, Florida. He has worked with record labels such as Monstercat, Thrive Music, and Ophelia Records.

== Career ==
=== 2014–2016: Beginnings ===
Trivecta began his career by releasing the melodic dubstep song "One Night Only" featuring Yohamna Solange on April 7, 2014, with record label Monstercat.

In 2015, Trivecta began to release songs of other genres, with the trance song "Evaporate" featuring Aloma Steele, and the house song "Drift Away" featuring Charlotte Haining.

=== 2017–2018: Touring ===
On July 17, 2017, Trivecta released a remix of Illenium's song "Fractures". It was described by Rachel Vensand of Dancing Astronaut as a "high-energy take on Illenium’s passionate track, adding a gliding drop to the melodic original."

He toured with many artists in 2017, including Illenium, Seven Lions, Tritonal, and Kill the Noise.

On September 24, 2018, Trivecta released the melodic dubstep song "Axis" with Monstercat, described as gut wrenching, "metal crunching dubstep paired with bright synth rolls" by Chris Stack of Dancing Astronaut.

=== 2019–2020: Ophelia Records releases ===
On January 4, 2019, Trivecta released the song "Island" in collaboration with Seven Lions, Wooli, and Nevve on record label Ophelia Records, which peaked at the No. 20 position on Billboard's Dance/Electronic Digital Song Sales chart. It was described by Billboard as a "deft mix of styles and feelings" and "equal parts fantasy getaway and monstrous mood as glowing melodies soar between hard drops".

On April 24, 2020, Trivecta released his debut EP, Everyday, via Ophelia Records, which fans described as "folk bass". Rachel Kupfer of EDM.com described the extended play as an "innovative fusion of indie folk music and the melodic bass championed by the label". Harry Levin of Dancing Astronaut called it a "connection to a younger, more hopeful past" that "many people long for in their music while living through the current contemporary".

=== 2021–2022: Debut album The Way Back Up ===
On January 15, 2021, Trivecta released his first single of the year, "Twilight of the Gods", via Ophelia Records. It is a riddim dubstep song which Jessica Mao of Dancing Astronaut described as "summoning divine auras in his gargantuan coalition of stabbing synths and whipping sound design".

Two years since his last release on Monstercat, Trivecta returned to the record label on March 23, 2021 with progressive house song "Ghost in the Machine". He described the song to Dancing Astronaut as a "callback to some of the progressive house tunes I put out with Monstercat in my early years".

On June 4, 2021, Trivecta released the song "Wild and Broken" in collaboration with Seven Lions, Blanke, and RBBTS. It is Trivecta's second collaboration with Seven Lions. Matthew Meadow of Your EDM described the song with drops as "intensely happy and perfectly indicative of each artists’ ability to produce incredible, uplifting music" and an "uptempo dubstep section that chugs along to the perfect headbanging tempo".

Trivecta was featured on Ophelia Records' first tour, the Pantheon tour, on October 1, 2021 alongside artists such as Blanke, Jason Ross, Kill the Noise, and Wooli. On the same day, the record label had its 100th release, "Pantheon", a seven-artist collaboration between Blastoyz, Dimibo, Jason Ross, Kill the Noise, Seven Lions, Trivecta, and Wooli. "Pantheon" combines psytrance, riddim, and melodic dubstep, and was made over the span of a year.

On October 8, 2021, Trivecta released the song "Light Up the Sky" in collaboration with Wooli and Creed member Scott Stapp via Ophelia Records. It was described by Matthew Meadow of Your EDM as "wonderfully powerful and anthemic in every way that it should have been", and Niko Sani of EDM.com as "a story of growth and how change comes from within". It is featured on Wooli's EP Resurrection.

On February 18, 2022, Trivecta released the song "Sail Away" featuring Jay Mason, announced to be the lead single of his debut album to be released on Ophelia Records. The song was described by Stephanie Otalora of EDM Identity as an "explosive, yet beautiful track features melodic highs and gritty bass drops that are paired with the powerful, uplifting vocals of singer-songwriter, Jason May to make it truly stand out".

On March 18, 2022, Trivecta released the second single from his debut album, "Open Road" featuring Rico & Miella. Megan Schriewer of Dancing Astronaut described it as "pulling inspiration from folk music and melodic bass" and a "reflection of both Trivectas' unique production style and Rico & Miellas' grassroots background". The third and final single from the album, "Back to the Start" featuring Isaac Warburton, was released on April 8, 2022.

On May 13, 2022, Trivecta released his debut album, The Way Back Up on Ophelia Records. Niko Sani of EDM.com described the album as "encapsulating the emotive sound that helped bring him to prominence while also showcasing his ability to effortlessly flow between genres." Matthew Meadow of Your EDM described the album's genres as "the classic melodic dubstep, a bit of country/folk, some liquid drum & bass, uber wonky bass, and some heavier dubstep with psytrance." In an interview with Dancing Astronaut, Trivecta said "I didn’t actually go into it thinking, 'hey, I’m making an album'. I was just kind of like sitting around in the studio and sketching little bits of DNA, even just 15-second clips of little ideas."

== Discography ==
=== Albums and extended plays ===
Title	Details
Everyday	Released: April 24, 2020; Label: Ophelia Records; Formats: Digital download
The Way Back Up	Released: May 13, 2022; Label: Ophelia Records; Formats: Digital download
Find My Way	Released: September 27, 2024; Label: Ophelia Records; Formats: Digital download

=== Singles ===
Title	Year	Album	Label
One Night Only (featuring Yohamna Solange)	2014	Non-album single	Monstercat
Believe (featuring Connor Zwetsch)	2014	Non-album single	Monstercat
The Surface (featuring Roniitt)	2014	Non-album single	Self-released
Ease My Soul (featuring Charlotte Haining)	2015	Non-album single	The EDM Network
Evaporate (featuring Aloma Steele)	2015	Non-album single	Monstercat
Resurface (featuring Roniitt)	2015	Non-album single	The EDM Network
Drift Away (featuring Charlotte Haining)	2015	Non-album single	Monstercat
The Vale (featuring Miyoki)	2016	Non-album single	Monstercat
Into the Limelight (featuring Danyka Nadeau)	2016	Non-album single	Monstercat
Labyrinth (featuring Miyoki)	2016	Non-album single	Tiny Diamond Records
Shatterpoint	2017	Non-album single	Artist Intelligence Agency
Now You Know (with Eminence featuring Aloma Steele)	2017	Non-album single	Proximity
Feel My Love	2017	Non-album single	Thrive Music
Break Me (featuring Karra)	2017	Rocket League x Monstercat Vol. 1	Monstercat
Falling (with Wooli)	2018	Non-album single	Monstercat
Axis	2018	Non-album single	Monstercat
Ghost of a Friend (featuring Koo)	2018	Non-album single	Luminous Beings
Island (with Seven Lions and Wooli featuring Nevve)	2019	Non-album single	Ophelia Records
Standing at the Edge	2019	Non-album single	Luminous Beings
Tornado (featuring Monika Santucci)	2019	Non-album single	Monstercat
Riptide (with Amidy and Rory)	2019	Non-album single	Monstercat
Best for You (featuring Selah Ford)	2019	Non-album single	Ophelia
Talk (featuring Bright Sparks)	2019	Non-album single	Ophelia
Revelation (with Varien)	2020	Non-album single	Ophelia
Leave It All Behind (featuring Fagin)	2020	Everyday	Ophelia
You Can Be My Light (with Nurko featuring Monika Santucci)	2020	Non-album single	Ophelia
Waiting for You (with Last Heroes featuring Runn)	2020	Non-album single	Ophelia
Twilight of the Gods	2021	Non-album single	Ophelia
Ghost in the Machine (featuring RØRY)	2021	Non-album single	Monstercat
Wild and Broken (with Seven Lions and Blanke featuring RBBTS)	2021	Non-album single	Ophelia
Hear My Call (with Gem & Tauri featuring Tyler Graves)	2021	Non-album single	Ophelia
Pantheon (with Blastoyz, Dimibo, Jason Ross, Kill the Noise, Seven Lions, and Wooli)	2021	Non-album single	Ophelia
Light Up the Sky (with Wooli featuring Scott Stapp)	2021	Resurrection	Ophelia
Sail Away (featuring Jay Mason)	2022	The Way Back Up	Ophelia
Open Road (featuring Rico & Miella)	2022	The Way Back Up	Ophelia
Back to the Start (featuring Rico & Miella)	2022	The Way Back Up	Ophelia
From Ashes To Love (featuring Jason Ross and RBBTS)	2023	Non-album single	Ophelia
Leviathan (featuring Caster)	2023	Non-album single	Ophelia
Let Go (with Ravenscoon featuring Jessy Covets)	2023	Non-album single	WAKAAN
Good in Goodbye (with Frank Walker)	2023	Origin	Sony Music
A Better World (with SLANDER featuring Chris Howard)	2024	Non-album single	Heaven Sent
Feel The Vibe (with Kill the Noise and Doktor)	2024	Non-album single	Ophelia
Wreck It (with Liquid Stranger)	2026	Non-album single	WAKAAN
