= The Throes of Winter =

EP by Seven Lions
- Released: March 16, 2015
- Genre: Dubstep
- Length: 24:44
- Label: Republic; Casablanca; Universal
- Producer: Jeff Montalvo

Seven Lions chronology
Worlds Apart (2014)	The Throes of Winter (2015)	Creation (2016)

The Throes of Winter is the fourth extended play (EP) by American DJ and record producer Seven Lions. It was released on March 16, 2015, via Casablanca Records and Republic Records. The EP has charted on multiple Billboard charts such as the Billboard 200 and Dance/Electronic Albums.

Professional ratings
Review scores
Source	Rating
Deadpress	6/10 stars

== Background ==
A follow-up to Seven Lions's Worlds Apart EP, The Throes of Winter consists of six songs featuring guest vocalists such as Haliene, Lynn Gunn, Sombear and Davey Havok, and songwriters such as Matthew Koma. AllMusic described the album as "skillfully pairing emotionally charged singer/songwriter pop with hypnotic dubstep." The EP was produced after Seven Lions worked with Casablanca to find vocalists that "match the songs".

== Track listing ==
No.	Title	Writer(s)	Length
1.	"Intro (The Throes of Winter)"	Jeff Montalvo	1:28
2.	"The End" (with Haliene)	Jenn Decilveo, Montalvo, Kelly Sweet, Keith Varon	4:52
3.	"Lose Myself" (featuring Lynn Gunn)	Ryland Blackinton, Dan Keyes, Montalvo, Justin Tranter	5:12
4.	"December" (featuring Davey Havok)	Davey Havok, Montalvo	6:41
5.	"A Way To Say Goodbye" (featuring Sombear)	Matthew Koma, Montalvo	4:54
6.	"Outro (Cold Without You)"	Montalvo	1:33

== Charts ==
Chart (2016)	Peak position
US Billboard 200	143
US Top Dance/Electronic Albums (Billboard)	3
US Heatseekers Albums (Billboard)	1
US Top Album Sales (Billboard)	72
