= V2 Presents =

V2 Presents is a dance music concert production and promotion company, based in Salt Lake City, Utah.

== About ==
V2 produces several larger scale music festivals annually. V2 also produces concerts and club events in various venues throughout Utah.

== History ==
V2 Presents was founded in 2005 by partners Jeremy Moreland, and Brandon Fullmer.

After five years of promoting concerts individually, and before V2 was founded, Jeremy and Brandon collaborated on a festival together known as Versus 2, held on Saturday, August 20 in the Diamond Fork area of Spanish Fork Canyon in Utah County, Utah. Versus 2 was a fundamental part in the history of V2 due to the invasion by local SWAT team and Police who shut the festival down. Festival goers were able to capture video of the raid, and the videos went viral on the internet with worldwide exposure and controversy. After the incident, Jeremy and Brandon joined to make one production and promotion company and named it after the Versus 2 event.

== Entities ==
=== Concert and festival production ===
V2 uses sound systems, video mapping, concert lighting, CO_{2} cannons, pyrotechnics, and fireworks, as well as event security and Emergency medical technicians for their indoor/outdoor festival productions. Their largest festivals to date are hosted at The Great Saltair, in Magna, Utah. The Great Saltair has an indoor stage, and two outdoor amphitheaters with a total capacity of around 10,000 people, and open access to the Great Salt Lake beaches.

=== Acts booked ===
Deadmau5, DJ Bl3nd, Tiesto, Hardwell, Ke$ha, Kaskade, Carl Cox, Calvin Harris, Wolfgang Gartner, Paul Van Dyk, Ferry Corsten, Dada Life, Flux Pavilion, Nero, Bassnectar, Above & Beyond, Sander Van Doorn, Pretty Lights, Mac Miller, Macklemore & Ryan Lewis, Nicky Romero, Benny Benassi, Fedde Le Grand, Infected Mushroom, Seven Lions, Datsik, Excision, Feed Me, etc.

== Highlights ==
- 2012 - V2 Presents partners with Disco Donnie Presents
- 2013 - V2 Presents and Disco Donnie Presents host a music showcase at Sundance Film Festival over four days, with Nervo, Kaskade, Macklemore & Ryan Lewis, and Ke$ha.
