= Cold Skin (Seven Lions and Echos song) =

2016 future bass single

Single by Seven Lions and Echos

from the album Monstercat 029 – Havoc
- Released: 9 November 2016
- Recorded: 2016
- Genre: Future bass; melodic dubstep
- Length: 3:32
- Label: Monstercat
- Songwriters: Jeff Montalvo; Tal Richards; Lexi Norton
- Producers: Jeff Montalvo; Tal Richards; Lexi Norton

Seven Lions singles chronology
"Rush Over Me" (2016)	"Cold Skin" (2016)	"Higher Love" (2017)

"Cold Skin" is a future bass song by American musicians Seven Lions and Echos. It was released on November 9, 2016 by independent electronic music label Monstercat.

== Background ==
Speaking to Billboard about the collaboration, Lexi Norton of Echos said:

"I remember I was at dinner when Tal called me and told me that Seven Lions wanted to make a track with us. I try to not let myself get excited over much, but imagine getting a phone call saying that one of your favorite artists wants to collaborate with you. That was probably the best feeling in the world."

Jeff Montalvo, better known as Seven Lions, further stated in an interview with EDMChicago that he wanted to work on a title featuring Norton, which turned into the collaboration.

== Reception and release ==
Maggie Patinelli of Billboard said the track was "perfect for driving across the Brooklyn Bridge at night with the windows down." Matthew Meadow of YourEDM called the track "a stunning example of melodic bass music with accompanying heavenly vocals – pick your favorite sports metaphor, “hole in one,” “slam dunk,” they all fit." Rachel Steer of Earmilk praised the track, calling it "classic Seven Lions with its ethereal sound, little glimmers of bass and stunning guest vocals."

== Remixes ==
An extended play featuring six remixes of "Cold Skin" was released on June 13, 2017 on Monstercat. Landon Fleury of YourEDM praised the variety of the remixers in the EP, from familiar Monstercat personalities to two surprise entries.

No.	Title	Length
1.	"Cold Skin" (Koven Remix)	3:47
2.	"Cold Skin" (Stonebank Remix)	4:25
3.	"Cold Skin" (V!rtu Remix)	4:00
4.	"Cold Skin" (Mr FijiWiji Remix)	3:45
5.	"Cold Skin" (Mitis Remix)	3:57
6.	"Cold Skin" (Intercom Remix)	4:48
Total length:		24:42
