= Cold Hearted (Seven Lions and Kill the Noise song) =

Single by Seven Lions and Kill the Noise

from the album Monstercat Uncaged Vol. 3
- Released: 25 October 2017
- Recorded: 2017
- Genre: Dubstep
- Length: 4:32
- Label: Monstercat
- Producer(s): Jeff Montalvo; Jacob Stanczak

Seven Lions singles chronology
"Where I Won't Be Found" (2017)	"Cold Hearted" (2017)	"Calling You Home" (2018)

Kill the Noise singles chronology
"Louder" (2015)	"Cold Hearted" (2017)	"Don't Give Up on Me" (2018)

"Cold Hearted" is a song by American electronic producers Jeff Montalvo and Jacob Stanczak. Canadian record label Monstercat released it on October 25, 2017.

== Background and release ==
In March 2017, During Excision's Paradox Tour, Kill the Noise first announced a collaboration between him and California-based electronic artist Seven Lions, playing the song in almost its entirety near the end of his set. The song would later be during various live sets by both Seven Lions and Kill the Noise for more than half a year prior to the song's release. On October 22, Seven Lions announced the song as "Cold Hearted" and that the song was to be released by Canadian record label Monstercat.

The song was released alongside the debut of the North-American tour titled Horizons Tour. The tour features both Seven Lions and Kill the Noise alongside American electronic duo Tritonal. "Cold Hearted" was featured on Monstercat's thirty-third compilation album titled Monstercat Uncaged Vol. 3 released on November 10, 2017. It was the third track on the album, which also includes 29 songs by various artists and two album mixes.

== Critical reception ==
"Cold Hearted" received generally positive reviews. Florito Maniego of We Rave You praised the song, writing that it "perfectly blends their respective signature sounds together, completing an awe-inspiring and bone-chilling electronic masterpiece", further stating "consisting of such top-notch electronic sounds and production quality, 'Cold Hearted' is overall an absolute must-hear tune for any music fan." Billboard's Dove Shore wrote that it is "the kind of song you can easily put on repeat", describing both Seven Lions and Kill the Noise as "monsters in the studio." Writing for Relentless Beats, Heather Kupka described the song as a "combative voices of the two producers", calling the song "nothing short of blissful." Lauren Ikenn of This Song Slaps described the song as a "true masterpiece", complementing the general structure of the song. Writing for EDM Sauce, Jim Babaoglu praised the song and wrote that it exceeded expectations, stating "knowing the quality of both producers, this song was destined for greatness." Your EDM's Landon Fleury wrote that the song seamlessly combined and contrasted both artists style of dubstep, further writing "it might be a bit strange, but it somehow ends up working harmoniously in the end."

== Track listing ==
"Cold Hearted"

No.	Title	Length
1.	"Cold Hearted"	4:32
Total length:		4:32

== Release history ==
Region	Date	Format	Version	Label	Ref.
Worldwide	October 25, 2017	Digital download	"Cold Hearted"	Monstercat	
Worldwide	November 10, 2017	Digital download	Monstercat Uncaged Vol. 3	Monstercat	
