= Another Me (song) =

2019 song by Seven Lions

Single by Seven Lions, Excision, and Wooli featuring Dylan Matthew

from the album Evolution
- Released: 30 August 2019
- Genre: Melodic dubstep; riddim
- Length: 3:28
- Label: Ophelia
- Songwriter: Dylan Matthew
- Producers: Jeff Montalvo; Jeff Abel; Adam Puleo

Seven Lions singles chronology
| "Break The Silence" (2019) | "Another Me" (2019) | "First Time" (2019) |

Excision singles chronology
| "Gold (Stupid Love)" (2018) | "Another Me" (2019) | "Feel Something" (2020) |

Wooli singles chronology
| "Psyclone" (2019) | "Another Me" (2019) | "Nothing Left" (2019) |

"Another Me" is a song by American DJs and record producers Seven Lions and Wooli, and Canadian electronic music producer and DJ Excision, featuring American singer-songwriter Dylan Matthew. The song was released through Seven Lions' record label Ophelia on 30 August 2019.

== Background and release ==
"Another Me" was initially a collaboration between Excision and Wooli until the latter, wanting to see Seven Lions and Excision collaborate, sent it over to Seven Lions. The then-unknown song debuted during Seven Lions' DJ set at Electric Forest Festival in late-June, 2019, though no release date was confirmed. In late-August, Seven Lions announced the song as "Another Me" on Twitter.

On 30 August 2019, the song was released as a digital download on international digital stores through American record label Ophelia, as well as being released through various music streaming services. The song is part of Excision and Wooli's extended play Evolution, which was released on 13 September 2019 through Excision Music. An acoustic version of the song was released later on 13 December 2019 through Ophelia.

== Critical reception ==
"Another Me" was well-received by most critics. Various electronic music journalists noted the song's combination of melodic dubstep and riddim, with Jessica Mao of Dancing Astronaut and Matthew Meadow of Your EDM both writing, that its first drop can be more suited for fans of melodic dubstep and its second drop as being more oriented towards bass music fans, with the specific style and elements associated with each of the artists being audibly prevalent. EDMTunes' Katie Steensma stated that the song would also be pleasing to "vocal-lovers" and that the song would "no doubt" be resonating with "the established electricity of the crowd." Writing for EDM.com, Niko Sani described the song as "everything fans of each artist could want and more" and would "become a favourite in the bass music scene", praising its bass, drums, lyrics, and synths.

== Charts ==
| Chart (2019) | Peak position |
|---|---|
| US Hot Dance/Electronic Songs (Billboard) | 46 |

== Release history ==
| Region | Date | Format | Version | Label | Ref. |
|---|---|---|---|---|---|
| Various | August 30, 2019 | Digital download; streaming | "Another Me" | Ophelia | |
