= Calling You Home =

Single by Seven Lions featuring Runn
- Released: 16 February 2018
- Recorded: 2017–2018
- Genre: Melodic dubstep
- Length: 4:44
- Label: Ophelia
- Songwriter(s): Runn
- Producer(s): Jeff Montalvo

Seven Lions singles chronology
"Cold Hearted" (2017)	"Calling You Home" (2018)	"Ocean" (2018)

"Calling You Home" is a song by American electronic music producer Jeff Montalvo, featuring vocals by vocalist Runn. Montalvo's own record label Ophelia released it on February 16, 2018.

== Background and release ==
"Calling You Home" was announced to the debut release of Montalvo's own record label, Ophelia. Alongside the announcement, Montalvo released a statement regarding Ophelia, writing:

Really happy to finally announce my new record label Ophelia. I’ve been lucky enough to release on some great record labels through the years but I couldn’t be more excited to have a home base for my music now. Looking forward to showing you all that I’ve been working on. Lots of collaborations and great artwork on the horizon. The first release is called Calling You Home feat. Runn and will be out Friday.

— Montalvo speaking about the debut of his record label

Billboard Dance's Matt Medved interviewed Montalvo during Miami Music Week at SiriusXM's "House of Chill". In which, they talked about the launch of Ophelia, saying that the song was "more of like a throwback to old school Seven Lions stuff" and that the record label would be able to do "all the stuff that a bigger record label would do but with a smaller team."

On February 16, 2018, the song was released as a digital download on international digital stores through record label Ophelia, as well as being released through various music streaming services. Prior to release, Calling You Home appeared as a scarcely played ID in several of Montalvo's live sets.

Alongside the song's release, Montalvo announced Chronicles, an experimental live show that was planned to debut at the WaMu Theatre in Seattle on May 12, 2018. The show was planned to feature various artists alongside Montalvo, including Liquid Soul, Kill the Noise, and Jason Ross.

== Remixes ==
An extended play of "Calling You Home" was released on March 14, 2018; it features three remixes by two artists, including American chillout artist Direct and English house and trance musician Oliver Smith. EDMTune's William Vance described Direct's remix as one that "brings on the downtempo chill-out feels in full force. With laidback drums and dreamy vocal chops to dazzle up the soundscape, it is easy to get lost in his otherworldly take." Writing for RaverRafting, Tori Matthews noted the faster pace and trance-inspired melody in Oliver Smith's remix, writing that Smith "isn’t afraid to bring in some dark elements with that ominous synth before totally lifting us up again. And then it’s just a masterful back and forth between both moods."

== Critical reception ==
"Calling You Home" was well received by most critics. Dancing Astronaut's Farrell Sweeney wrote that the song has the "capacity to appeal to a diverse group of fans as well with its mystical vibe", stating that "Runn's vocals are a focal point of the track, but pulsing basslines with dramatic breaks and builds captivate the listener to their chore." Diana Jadd of EDM Sauce described the song as one that is "filled with stunning vocals, wonderful melodic chords and obsessively great drops" Your EDM's Karlie Powell stated the song played out "gloriously with ethereal vocals, euphoric melodies, and straight up addictive drops — all of which make this track a worthy first release for the label." Lisa-sun Nguyen of EDM Identity praised the song, describing it as a song that could be instantly recognised to be produced by Montalvo, writing that the song was "This new track is completely representative of his signature sound, which combines beautiful vocals, catchy lyrics, and dubstep for an epic track."

== Track listing ==
Digital download – Single
No.	Title	Length
1.	"Calling You Home"	4:44
Total length:		4:44

Digital download – Remixes
No.	Title	Length
1.	"Calling You Home" (Oliver Smith Remix)	2:35
2.	"Calling You Home" (Direct Remix)	4:05
3.	"Calling You Home" (Oliver Smith Extended Mix)	7:01
Total length:		13:41

== Release history ==
Region	Date	Format	Version	Label	Ref.
Worldwide	February 16, 2018	Digital download	"Calling You Home" (feat. Runn)	Ophelia Records	
Worldwide	March 14, 2018	Digital download	"Calling You Home" (feat. Runn) [Remixes]	Ophelia Records	
