= Creation (Seven Lions EP) =

EP by Seven Lions
- Released: March 25, 2016
- Genre: Melodic dubstep
- Length: 31:47
- Label: Casablanca
- Producer: Seven Lions

Seven Lions chronology
The Throes of Winter (2015)	Creation (2016)	Where I Won't Be Found (2017)

Singles from Creation
- 1. "Falling Away" Released: August 14, 2015

Creation is the fifth extended play (EP) by American DJ and record producer Seven Lions. Released on March 25, 2016, via Casablanca Records and consisting of seven songs, the EP peaked on the Top Dance/Electronic Albums chart at number one.

== Background ==
Seven Lions said about the album: "Really glad to finally get this EP out there. Some of these songs I have been working on for years. A few of these you will recognize from my recent live sets. As well as having some high energy songs for this EP I really wanted to experiment with some non-dance floor related tracks and really get back to my metal and acoustic roots."

Songs from the EP have been described as grimy, glitchy, heavy rock-inspired, and classical and metal-infused. The EP is described as an "eclectic and genre-hopping odyssey that dips and dives through drum & bass, dance, progressive house, and melodic dubstep."

The EP became Seven Lions's first number one album on the Dance/Electronic Albums chart.

== Track listing ==
No.	Title	Length
1.	"Intro"	1:36
2.	"Summer of the Occult"	5:40
3.	"Creation" (featuring Vök)	5:11
4.	"Coming Home" (featuring Mike Mains)	3:08
5.	"The Journey"	5:21
6.	"Falling Away" (featuring Lights) [Festival Mix] (Radio Edit)	3:45
7.	"Leaving Earth"	7:06

== Charts ==
Chart (2016)	Peak position
US Top Dance/Electronic Albums (Billboard)	1
