= Blanke (DJ) =

Australian DJ and producer

- Born: John Paul Orchison; 16 December 1991 (age 34); Bundaberg, Queensland, Australia
- Origin: Canberra, Australian Capital Territory, Australia
- Genres: New beat; dubstep; bass; electro; breakbeat; house; future bass; drum and bass
- Occupations: DJ; producer
- Years active: 2015–present
- Labels: Deadbeats; KLASH; Kannibalen; Dim Mak; Downright; Astralwerks; Monstercat; Etcetc; Joytime Collective; Circus; Buygore; Lowly Palace; Ophelia; Ultra

John Paul Orchison (born 16 December 1991), known professionally as Blanke (Note: Pronounced "blank"), is an Australian electronic music producer and DJ from Canberra.

== Career ==
Blanke's first release was a remix of Death Ray Shake on Ministry Of Sound's Downright Music label in 2015. After that in 2016 he released his first EP "Black Mamba/Koji" under Artist Intelligence Agency. After a year Blanke made his debut under the KLASH label with his first single "Immunity". In 2017 John introduced his second EP "Curiosity" and released few remixes. 2018 has been a very productive year for him. He released collaborations and remixes on Buygore, Dim Mak Records, Kannibalen Records, Etcetc Music, WeDidIt, Ultra Records, Joytime Collective, Circus Media. The following year he released "Mixed Signals" as a result of collaboration with electronic music producer Rezz. In 2019 his collaboration with Illenium "Gorgeous" was featured on Illenium's new album Ascend. Blanke accompanied Nick on his tour across the North America as main support for his new album. Later that year he had his first Deadbeats release "Alt.Colour//Voice In The Machine EP" and then "Change & Decay EP". In 2020 he released his follow up EP titled "Change & Decay: The Fall" on Deadbeats Records, which featured Alchemy, a record that went onto to peak at #1 most played on Australia's triple j. and 2021, Blanke made his debut on Seven Lions label Ophelia Records, release collaborations with Jason Ross, Seven Lions as well as 3 Solo singles. He performed at Lost Lands, EDC Las Vegas and many more festival throughout the North American Summer. Blanke also has a Drum and bass project named "ÆON:MODE" which was created during early 2021.

== Discography ==
=== Extended plays ===
Title	Released	Record label	Additional information
Black Mamba / Koji	2016	Artist Intelligence Agency	
Curiosity	2017	Downright Music	
Sneaky Plans	2018	Downright Music	
Alt.Colour / Voice In The Machine	2019	Deadbeats	
Change & Decay	2019	Deadbeats	with GG Magree
Change & Decay: The Fall	2020	Deadbeats	
Land of the Wayfarer	2022	Ophelia	
Emergence	2024	Monstercat	

=== Singles ===
Title	Released	Record label	Additional information
"Immunity"	2017	KLASH	included in "KLASH: Dime Pieces"
"Resistance"	2017	KLASH	
"Blue"	2017	Downright Music	with Samsaruh
"Supercharged"	2018	Dim Mak Records	with Kayoh
"Chaos"	2018	Buygore	with Zeke Beats - included in Zeke Beats "Devastate EP"
"Destiny"	2018	-	with 1788-L
"Disturbed"	2018	-	with Avance
"Artifacts"	2018	Kannibalen Records	with JayKode - included in "All I Want For Christmas Is Bass Vol.3"
"Mixed Signals"	2018	-	with Rezz
"Hacker"	2019	Kannibalen Records	with Black Tiger Sex Machine - included in Black Tiger Sex Machine "Download The Future EP"
"Contact"	2019	Downright Music	with ATLiens
"Gorgeous"	2019	Astralwerks	with Illenium and Bipolar Sunshine - included in Illenium "Ascend LP"
"Hellraiser"	2019	Dim Mak Records	with Godlands
"Flatline"	2019	Downright Music	with Calivania
"Time Travel"	2020	Kannibalen Records	with Black Tiger Sex Machine
"Fragile Violence"	2020	Downright Music	with Nevve
"Control"	2020	-	
"Flatline (Reprise)"	2020	-	
"Mystery"	2021	Downright Music	
"One More Day"	2021	Ophelia	with Jason Ross featuring Chandler Leighton
"Spark"	2021	Ophelia	with Dia Frampton
"Wild and Broken"	2021	Ophelia	with Seven Lions and Trivecta featuring Rbbts
"Survive"	2021	Ophelia	with Luma
"Boom"	2021	Ophelia	
"Breathe"	2021	Deadbeats	first track to feature his vocals
"Blackout"	2021	Insomniac Records	
"Mitosis"	2021	Deadbeats	with Deathpact
"Stuck On You"	2022	Ophelia	with Donna Tella
"Lights Out"	2022	Ophelia	with Runn
"Heaven"	2024	Monstercat	with Rival and KC
"Crashing Hard"	2024	Monstercat	with Casey Cook
"Heavy Heart"	2024	Monstercat	with Grant and your friend polly
"Everywhere, Nowhere"	2024	HypnoVizion Records	with Rezz
"State Of Mind"	2024	Deadbeats	with Friction, Lauren L'aimant and ÆON:MODE
"Revival"	2024	EARTH TO THE STARS	with RIOT
"Stop, Go"	2024	UKF	with ÆON:MODE
"Turmoil"	2024	Monstercat	with Au5

=== Remixes ===
Title	Released	Record label	Additional information
"Death Ray Shake & Scribe & Savage - Not Many If Any"	2015	Downright Music	
"Friendless featuring Dirty Hary - Actin' Up"	2016	Be Rich Records	
"Peking Duk featuring Elliphant - Stranger"	2017	Sony Music Entertainment	included in "Peking Duk featuring Elliphant - Stranger Remixes Pt.1"
"Tommy Trash featuring Daisy Guttridge - Sinners"	2017	Astrx	
"Kilter featuring Gill Bates - No Games"	2018	Etcetc	
"William Black and Rico & Miella - Here At Last"	2018	Lowly Palace	
"RL Grime - Pressure"	2018	WeDidIt	included in "RL Grime - Nova The Remixes Vol.2"
"Carmada featuring Tribes - Ready For It"	2018	Circus Media	
"Prince Fox featuring Quinn XCII - Space"	2018	Dim Mak Records	
"Steve Aoki featuring Lil Yachty & AJR - Pretender"	2018	Ultra Records	
"Jonas Blue and Jack&Jack - Rise"	2018	Positiva	
"Marshmello featuring Bastille - Happier"	2018	Joytime Collective	
"Pnau - Changa"	2018	Etcetc	
"Illenium - Pray"	2019	Astralwerks	included in "Illenium - Pray (Remixes)"
"Party Favor & EZI - Be Ok"	2019	Area 25	included in "Party Favor - Layers Remix EP"
"Cailin Russo and Chrissy Costanza - Phoenix"	2019	-	
"Crooked Colours - I C Light"	2020	SweatItOut!	
"Slander & Said The Sky featuring JT Roach - Potions"	2020	Monstercat	included in "Slander & Said The Sky feat JT Roach - Potions (Remixes)"
"Rynx featuring Kiesza - All For You"	2020	Avant Garden/Island Records	
"Dabin - Drown"	2021	Seeking Blue Records	
"Said the Sky, Illenium & Chelsea Cutler - Walk Me Home"	2022	Lowly	

=== Flips ===
Title	Released
"Virtual Self - Eon Break"	2018
"Boys Noize - Overthrow"	2018
"K?d - Zero One"	2018
"Skrillex - Reptile"	2018
"Madeon - Imperium"	2018
"Nero - Satisfy"	2019
"Paramore - Crushcrushcrush"	2019

== Awards and nominations ==
=== J Awards ===
The J Awards are an annual series of Australian music awards that were established by the Australian Broadcasting Corporation's youth-focused radio station Triple J. They commenced in 2005.

Year	Nominee / work	Award	Result	Ref.
J Awards of 2021	Blanke	Unearthed Artist of the Year	Nominated	
