= Liquid Stranger =

Swedish-American electronic musician

- Also known as: Bloatsucher, Hectopascal, Necton, Rhoca, Plantman, Slugger
- Born: Martin Johan Stääf; 13 November 1978 (age 47)
- Origin: Varberg, Sweden
- Genres: Downtempo, dubstep, brostep, drum and bass, dub
- Occupations: Disc jockey, musician, songwriter, producer, remixer, studio engineer
- Instruments: Piano, electronics, computer, softsynth, drum machine, synthesizer, percussion
- Labels: Interchill Records, Kahvi Collective, Spirit Zone Recordings, Wakaan, Sskwaan, Candy Mind records, Subnatura, Monotonik, Adversion Recordings, Six Degrees, Bleep Street, Escapi, Flexible, Sonic Walker, System Recordings, Amenorea, Rottun Recordings
- Website: liquidstranger.com

Martin Johan Stääf (born 13 November 1978), also known as Liquid Stranger, is a Swedish electronic musician and DJ, described by Generation Bass as "the epitome of Transnational Dubstep covering everything from Latin, Asian, Eastern European and Jamaican Dancehall dubs." Martin Stääf is known for his experimental approach to composition where he merges genres to create a unique style of music. Martin Woods of Chillbase describes Liquid Stranger's music as a "unique blend of Ambience, Big Band Jazz, Dubstep and Psychedelica drizzled over electronic Dub Reggae grooves." Stääf lives in Edmond, Oklahoma.

== History ==
=== Early years ===
Martin Stääf was born 13 November 1978 in Varberg on the Swedish West Coast. He started playing the piano and did classical piano concerts between the ages of 6–8. Stääf started experimenting with synthesizers in the mid 80s and abandoned the classical music world to spend the next 10 years producing his own material. Stääf states: "I never thought about releasing any of my music until I was 17. Then, all of a sudden, it was time to get a job and I realized that there was nothing else I wanted to do at that time than making music."

=== Early career: late 1990s ===
Martin Stääf worked in the commercial studio Bohus Sound Recordings 1997–1999 and engineered/produced various jazz and rock bands. During this time he also made a song for the Euro-Vision contest.

In 1997 Martin Stääf formed the music group Necton together with Patrik Olsén, mainly focusing on progressive and psychedelic trance. Necton released two full-length albums, 6 vinyl EPs, and were featured on numerous CD compilations. They were signed to Spirit Zone Recordings, Digital Structures and Spiral Trax. Necton toured extensively around the world between 1997 and 2003.

During this time, Martin Stääf released Nu Skool Breaks on labels Ministry of Sound, Sound of Habib, Muti Music, Random Recordings, Hope Recordings, and Muve Recordings under the alias Rhoca. Stääf also released funky Techno on Iboga Records, Plusquam Records, and Nanobeat Records.

=== The Liquid Stranger Project: 2003–2009 ===
Martin Stääf launched the Liquid Stranger project in 2003. His intention was to have one alias that would encompass all his musical output. Consequently, he has produced a wide variety of music under the name Liquid Stranger. At first, Stääf's plan was to keep his identity a secret. He never did interviews or showed his face on stage. Stääf states: "After a while it became quite tricky. in fact, Interchill finally ruined this idea by writing my name on the record sleeves." Liquid Stranger's creative output ranges from suggestive Ambient soundscapes to movie scores, pop, dub, infernalia, drill n bass, and electronica.

The first release under the name Liquid Stranger was the song Environmental Meltdown, featured on the compilation Global Psychedelic Chill Out – Compilation Vol. 4 by Spirit Zone Recordings.

When asked in an interview why he moved away from the trance scene, Stääf replied: "I never really switched per se, I have always made tons of different types of music. During the time I toured with Necton, I produced various stuff like Ambient, Electro and Drill n bass. What excites me is the fusing of genres. I have no fixed style that I stay with too long, I do not like boundaries."

=== Subnatura collective ===
In 2003, Martin Stääf founded the musical collective Subnatura together with Marckus Andersson. Subnatura released 12 digital Ep's and were featured on net label Monotonik and the video DVD Collectanea: First Course, released by Escapi Music.

=== Candy Mind records ===
In 2004, Martin Stääf founded the record label Candy Mind Records together with his brother Jens Stääf. Candy Mind Records released 33 digital Ep's, and one full-length CD release from Dorothy's Magic Bag. During the Candy Mind era, Martin Stääf and his brother started the duo Hectopascal. They released the full-length album Anywhere And Me on Kahvi records. The Ep's Pixels and Pixies, and Alive in Veddige were released on Candy Mind Records.

=== Interchill records ===
In 2005, Stääf got signed to Canadian label Interchill Records. The song Political Finga was featured on Earth Octave Lounge Vol. 2, and received high praise from the dub community. The song Liquid Stranger on the Run appeared on the compilation Dissolving Clouds and got frequent plays on underground radio. Rick Anderson of Allmusic wrote about Liquid Stranger "As someone who has previously worked in progressive rock, punk, techno, breakbeat, and IDM genres, Staaf brings a certain sophistication to his Interchill-style dubtronica, and there is lots to hear for those who take the trouble to listen closely: the brass and orchestral samples bubbling beneath the surface of the gently churning dub of Liquid Stranger on the Run."

The song We Meet at Last appeared on the compilation Bliminal, and was licensed by Velcrow Ripper for the film Fierce Light – Where Spirit Meets Action, released in 2008.

=== The Invisible Conquest ===
The first full-length Liquid Stranger album, The Invisible Conquest, was released by Interchill Records in 2007. A bass-heavy album with melodic bass lines, percussive grooves, tribal accents and minimal psychedelic overlays. The Invisible Conquest received high ratings and praise from critics. Properly Chilled wrote of the album "Liquid Stranger's sound has the grandeur of its peers without building an humongous ego. . .we give this record two thumbs way up and a standing ovation", and Raves.com described it as "A taste of the experimental, a chunk of tribal, all wrapped around a root of dub excellence. . .dub vibes that shoot right through to the middle of your gut." Morpeus Music describes the music of Liquid Stranger as "Bass driven atmospheric chillout. Liquid Stranger creates mostly instrumental montages with strong rhythmic content."

=== The Intergalactic Slapstick ===
The second full-length Liquid Stranger album was released by Interchill Records in 2009. This album saw Liquid Stranger moving significantly into heavier Dubstep and reggae influenced grooves. Vocalists Brother Culture, Danman, Deeyah and Warrior Queen are featured on the album. Seb Taylor from Kaya Project plays Steel Guitar on the songs His Fully Automatic Wheelbarrow, and Dew Point. Dub-connection wrote of the album "the production varies and waves between an electro-dub chill-out and powerful tracks in the limit of drum and bass with a bit of stepper to spice the sound." Morpheus Music wrote of the album "The diverse roots of Liquid Stranger's sound sprawl across electro, ambient, grime, global, breaks and garage."

=== The Private Riot ===
The third full-length Liquid Stranger album was released on Rottun Recordings on 15 March 2010. This album features 10 dark and energetic Dubstep songs, described by Music and Happy Life as "totally devastating dance-floor monsters." The album received high praise in the electronic music scene, with the song "Ripple" hitting number 1 on Beatport's top download charts for an extended period of time.

=== Mechanoid Meltdown ===
Liquid Stranger's fourth full-length album was also released on Rottun Recordings in 2010 on 29 November. The album includes Dubstep songs and two Drum and Bass tracks.

=== Balance and Smoke & Hope ===
In May 2022, the Swedish producer Liquid Stranger shared with Billboard magazine in his own words the practices that help him manage the stress of the music industry and how he can implement these strategies in his own life, this after being diagnosed with a mental health disease.

== Background information ==
=== Influences ===
Martin Stääf mentioned in an interview on BBC Radio that his main influence comes from music from vintage computer games. In an interview with Chillbase, Stääf says that he does not listen to music all that much, except when he is at concerts. In the same interview Stääf explains that he gets inspiration from movie soundtracks, dreams, and everyday life.

== Discography ==
=== Albums ===
- The Invisible Conquest (2007)
- The Intergalactic Slapstick (2009)
- Steel Trap EP (2010)
- The Private Riot (2010)
- Mechanoid Meltdown (2010)
- The Arcane Terrain (2011)
- Wetware Warfare EP (2011)
- Cryogenic Encounters (2012)
- Elemental EP (2013)
- The Renegade Crusade EP (2014)
- Anomaly: The Collection (2015)
- Weird & Wonderful EP (2017)
- Polarity EP (2018)
- Infinity LP (2019)
- Ascension EP (2020)
- Balance LP (2022)
- Unity EP (2023)

=== Singles ===
- It Came From The Dessert (2003)
- Subsonic Soil (2004)
- Pixies And Pixels (2004)
- Dead Or Alive (2005)
- Spores (2005)
- Alive in Veddige (2005)
- Banana(Electro)Split (2006)
- Monster (2009)
- Get To The Point Hydroplane (2009; with Excision)
- Steel Trap (2009)
- One (2010; with Excision)
- Dissolve (2015)
- Trigger Happy Get To The Point Hydroplane (2016)
- Hotbox (2017)
- Dragonhawks (2018; with Space Jesus)
- Gunslinger (2019; featuring Pistol)
- Burn Like Sun (2019; featuring Leah Culver)
- Ceremony (2019; with CloZee)
- Hydroplane (2019; featuring Warrior Queen and HARD KNOCK)
- Run For Cover (2021; featuring MC Shells)
- Splastic Elastic (2021; with Dion Timmer)
- Redline (2019; featuring Spear)
- Jungle Juice (2019; with Ganja White Night)
- Sunken Technology (2020; with LSDream)
- POTIONS (2021; with LSDream)
- Take a Trip (2022; with LSDream)
- Misfits (2022; with Sully)
- Flashback (2022; featuring Alexa Lusader)
- Restless (2024; with NGHTMRE featuring Mogleta)
- In My Mind (2024)
- Trailblazer (2024; with ProbCause)
- Walk to The Sun (2024; with Sully featuring Crooked Bangs)
- Hit The Wax (2024)
- Fire (2024; with EVVAN)
- Hard (2024; with Scrufizzer)
- Dynamite (2021; with Sully featuring Sukuward)
- Revolution (2025)
- Lost In The Sauce (2025; with Ganja White Night)
- Melt (2025)
- Movement (2025; with GorillaT featuring Yana Mahal)
- Wreck It (2026; with Trivecta)

=== Tracks appeared on ===
- Collectanea First Course – "Impossible Mission" (2003)
- Global Psychedelic Chill Out Vol. 4 – "Environmental Meltdown" (2003)
- Subnatural Soundscapes Vol I – "From The Sky" (2003)
- Purple Pollen – "Bismarch" (2004)
- Some Candy Before Christmas – "Ginger Bread Juice" (2004)
- Sound of Subnatura – "Onda Ögat" (2004)
- Burning Chocolate – " Den Infekterade Terminalen" (2005)
- Dissolving Clouds – "Liquid Stranger on the Run" (2005)
- Earth Octave Lounge Vol. 2 – "Political Finga" (2005)
- Promotion CD 2005 – "Velour, Bleck" (2005)
- Electromeister 1.0 – "Smeartest" (2006)
- Masters of the Green Insects – "Jakten På Guldpokalerna" (2006)
- New World Dub 01 – "Political Finga" (2006)
- A Beginning of an End – "I And I" (2007)
- Bliminal – "We Meet at Last" (2007)
- Amenorea Dubs (Volume 01) – "Zenmaniax" (2008)
- One Dub – "Welcome to My Culvert" (2009)
- dimmSummer presents: Nu Asian SoundZ – "Hexed and Perplexed featuring Deeyah" (2010)
- dimmSummer presents: SUBcontinentalBASS – "Fist of Fury" (2011)
- Bon Merde Remix EP (2012)

=== Remixes ===
- "Slem – Denri (Liquid Stranger Remix)" (2004)
- "Dorothy's Magic Bag – Ghostmachine (Liquid Stranger Laxative Remix)" (2004)
- "Hectopascal – Svälj Din Saliv (Liquid Stranger Remix)" (2004)
- "Goto80 – Wombatman (Liquid Stranger's Duplomix)(2005)"
- "Bruno Ferrari – Jean Gabin (Liquid Stranger's Duplomix)" (2005)
- "Dorothy's Magic Bag – Monster (Liquid Stranger Remix)" (2006)
- "Bombay Dub Orchestra – Journey (Liquid Stranger's Sliptrip Edit)" (2009)
- "Goto80 – Breakfast (Liquid Stranger's Gourmet Mixture)" (2009)
- "Specialist & Tru Skool – Dhaaru Pee Ke (Liquid Stranger Remix)" (2010)
- "Love Avalanche – Less Corruption (Liquid Stranger Remix)" (2010)
- "Psilodump – The Somnambulist (Liquid Stranger's Dirtnap Remix)" (2010)
- "El Diablo – Devil in the Machine (Liquid Stranger Remix)" (2011)
- "FreQ Nasty – Bon Merde (Liquid Stranger Remix)" (2012)
- "Getter – Ill Shit (Liquid Stranger Remix)" (2012)
- "Awolnation – Sail (Liquid Stranger Remix)" (2012)
- "Infected Mushroom – Never Mind (Liquid Stranger Remix)" (2012)
- "Downlink - Factory (Liquid Stranger Remix)" (2012)
- "Noisia - Friendly Intentions (Liquid Stranger Remix)" (2012)
- "Kai Wachi - Demons (Liquid Stranger Remix)" (2017)

== Record Labels ==
- Adversion Recordings
- Amenorea
- Bleep Street
- Candy Mind Records
- Escapi
- Flexible
- High Chai Recordings
- Interchill Records
- Kahvi Collective
- Monotonik
- Rottun Recordings
- Six Degrees
- Sonic Walker
- Spirit Zone Recordings
- Subnatura
- System Recordings
- Wakaan
- Sskwan
