= Wooli =

American riddim and dubstep DJ and producer

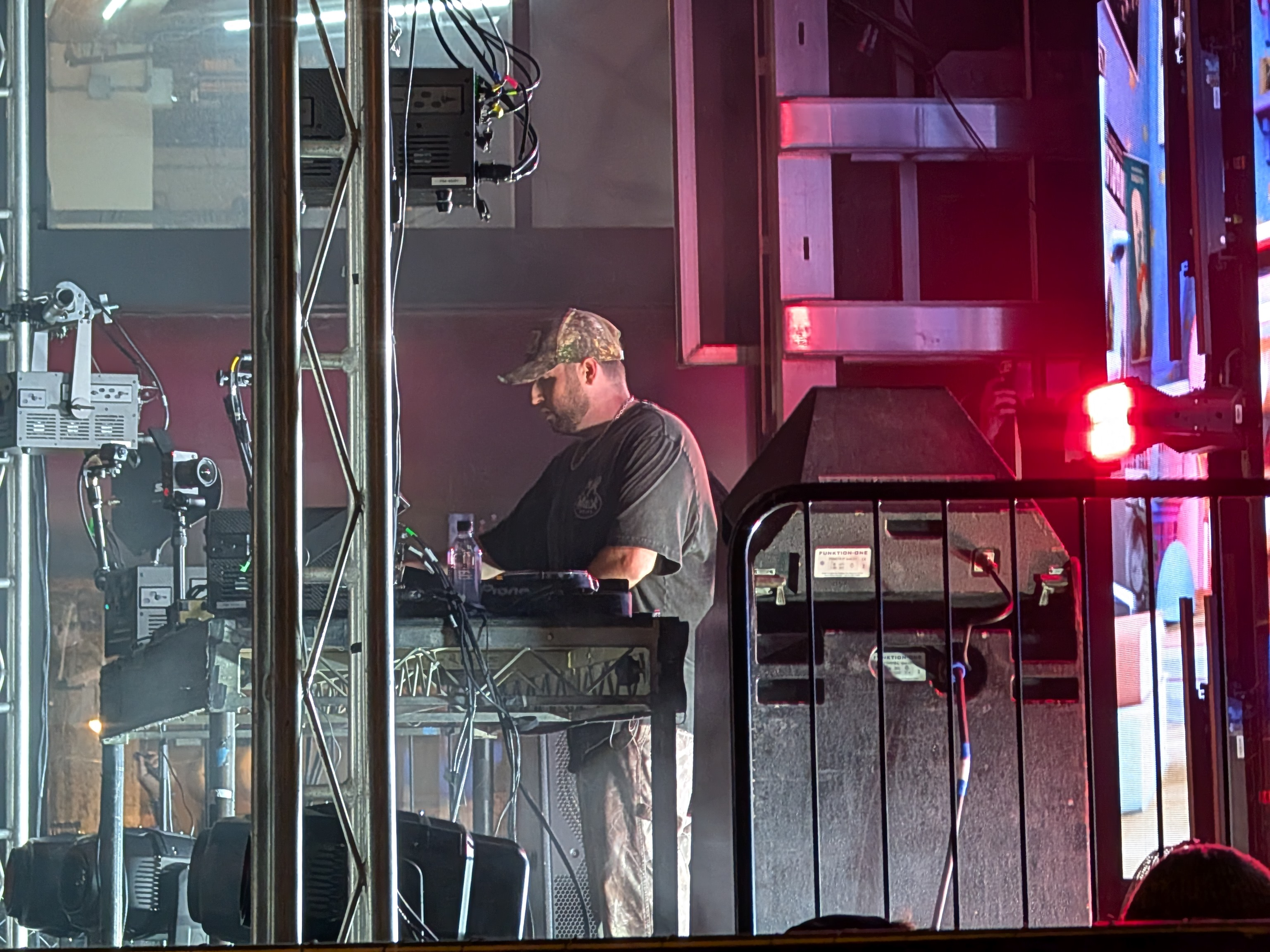
- Wooli performing at a block party on 63 Ellis Street in San Francisco 12-18-2025

Background information
- Born: Adam Louis Puleo
- Origin: Rochester, New York, U.S.
- Genres: Briddim; Riddim; dubstep; future bass
- Occupations: Disc jockey; record producer; composer
- Instrument: Digital audio workstation
- Years active: 2016–present
- Labels: Circus; Firepower; Monstercat; Never Say Die; Rottun; Ophelia; Subsidia
- Website: woolimusic.com

Adam Louis Puleo, better known by his alias Wooli, is an American briddim, riddim and dubstep DJ and producer. He is known for the songs "Island" and "Another Me", with the prior being a collaboration with American dubstep producers Seven Lions and Trivecta and the latter being a collaboration with Seven Lions and Canadian producer and DJ Excision. "Island" peaked at the No. 20 position on Billboard's Dance/Electronic Digital Song Sales chart in early 2019. "Another Me" peaked on the Hot Dance/Electronic Songs at the No. 46 position in late 2019.

== Early life ==
Puleo grew up in Rochester, New York, and was first introduced to bass music with a mix produced by English drum and bass producer Andy C. After attending several Bassnectar shows and other electronic music festivals, he considered himself a "dubstep rave kid" since 2010, attending as many shows as possible.

== Career ==
=== 2016: "Gettin That", "DayDream", and "After All" remix ===
On August 18, 2016, Puleo released his remix of the song "Gettin That" originally by Dirty Audio & Rickyxsan as a free digital download. The future bass remix originally debuted on the BBC Radio 1 radio show Diplo & Friends. Jeffrey Yau of Your EDM noted the song's "percussion kicks, synth chords, and jersey club squeaks" and described the song as an "atomic bomb coupled with a meteor strike."

On October 4, Puleo collaborated with dubstep producer Jantsen to release the song "DayDream" via Good Enuff. Run the Trap's Peach Gallagher called it a "hard-hitting anthem that will have you headbanging in no time." Writing for ThisSongSlaps, Brian Bonavoglia commented that the song is "one of the hardest-hitting tunes we’ve heard in recent months."

On December 20, a remix extended play of the song "After All" by Slander and YOOKiE was released via Never Say Die Records. Puleo, in collaboration with Los Angeles-based dubstep producer Kompany, was featured on the extended play alongside other dubstep producers Habstrakt, Laxx, and Xilent. A VIP mix of the remix was later released on March 2, 2017.

=== 2017: "Back / Like I Used To" ===
On July 7, 2017, Puleo released the single "Back / Like I Used To", featuring Eli Flynn as vocals on the latter, via Circus Records. Writing for Dancing Astronaut, Austin Evenson described "Back" as "ear-splitting", later saying that the song shined "his crisp yet thrashing drop of scraping, snarling composition." Noiseporn's Lennon Cihak talked about "Like I Used To", writing that it is smoother compared to "Back", noting it's the use of Eli Flynn's vocals and "superb guitar talents."

=== 2018: "Falling", Mammoth, and SoundCloud ===
On May 21, 2018, American music producer Trivecta collaborated with Puleo to release the song "Falling" via Monstercat. The song has been described by writers of EDM Sauce and EDMTunes as a combination of both producer's respective styles, mixing bass-focused with melodic dubstep.

On July 3, English music producer and DJ Gammer released the first part of the remixes to his song "The Drop" via Monstercat. Various electronic music producers such as 4B, NvrLeft, Skellism, Slippy, and Stonebank, alongside Puleo, were featured on the remix extended play. ThisSongSlaps' Brian Bonavoglia stated that his remix was an "explosive rendition" of the original song, also describing it as "bone-rattling".

On September 26, English dubstep and drum and bass producer FuntCase released his collaboration with Puleo as part of the compilation album FuntCase Presents: DPMO, Vol. 2. The collaboration, titled "Man Don’t Want War" and featuring vocalist Clipson, was released as the compilation album's final single before release.

On October 5, Puleo released his second extended play Mammoth via Never Say Die. The four-track extended play included the songs "Throw It Up", "Elephant March", "Need U", and "Thicc Boi". Puleo created the extended play wanting to represent who he is as a person on and off stage, with it containing both briddim and melodic dubstep that is both emotional and personal to him.

On November 14, Quebec-based "vomitstep" producer Snails collaborated with Puleo to release the song "Snailephant" via Slugz Music. The song was released as a single off of Snails' extended play Slimeageddon.

In November, various bass music and dubstep musicians and producers had most or all of their songs from online audio distribution platform and music sharing website SoundCloud for wrongful copyright claims. Puleo was among these artists who had their songs removed. Speaking through Twitter, he released a statement concerning the claims, specifically noting his collaboration with Mastadon and hoping that the claims would get resolved quickly.

=== 2019: "Island", "Another Me", Evolution EP and "Nothing Left" ===
On January 4, 2019, American DJ and record producer Seven Lions collaborated with Puleo and Trivecta to release the song "Island", featuring Nevve as vocals, via Seven Lions' record label Ophelia. Writing for Billboard, Dove Shore called it a "deft mix of styles and feelings" and called it "equal parts fantasy getaway and monstrous mood as glowing melodies soar between hard drops." Farrell Sweeney of Dancing Astronaut wrote that the song found "a way to meld blissful yet abrasive melodic dubstep elements together."

On August 30, Seven Lions collaborated with Canadian producer and DJ Excision and Puleo to release the song "Another Me" via Ophelia. Dancing Astronaut's Jessica Mao noted the song's "charged melodies, open-hearted vocals, and thundering bass" as the incorporation of each producer's respective styles. Matthew Meadow of Your EDM also noted the mix of the respective producers styles, writing that "the beautiful elements of each artist, every section of the track hits a bit different, whether on the melodic side or the downright dastardly bass-heavy side."

On September 13, Puleo released his third extended play Evolution via Never Say Die. The extended play was a collaboration between Puleo and Excision, containing four tracks, including the songs "Lockdown", "Oxygen", "Evolution", and the previously released "Another Me".

On October 25, Puleo released "Nothing Left" with William Black and RUNN via Ophelia.

2026 collaborations

In August 2026, Wooli and Crankdat released "Fux With Us", their first official studio collaboration under the name WANKDAT, featuring rapper TiaCorine.

Later that month, Wooli collaborated with Kaskade on the single "Hear Me Now", featuring Dutch singer MAXINE. The track was released through Kaskade's Arkade record label.

== Artistry ==
Puleo takes inspiration from songs outside of dubstep and riddim, such as film music, trance, and other melodic genres. He produces what he calls "briddim", a fusion subgenre of brostep and riddim that focuses on utilising heavier snares and kicks.

Various online music magazines have included Puleo in their "artists to watch" lists. Writers for Run the Trap, UKF, and EDMTunes had placed him in their lists for 2017, 2018, and 2019, respectively.

== Discography ==
=== Albums and extended plays ===
Title	Details
The Cave	Released: March 10, 2017; Label: Firepower Records; Formats: Digital download
Mammoth	Released: October 5, 2018; Label: Never Say Die; Formats: Digital download
Evolution (with Excision)	Released: September 13, 2019; Label: Self-released; Formats: Digital download
Resurrection	Released: December 3, 2021; Label: Ophelia Records; Formats: Digital download

==== As featured artist ====
Title	Details
After All (Remixes) by Slander & Yookie	Released: December 19, 2016; Label: Never Say Die; Format: Digital download
Virus: The Remixes by Excision	Released: September 12, 2017; Label: Rottun Recordings; Format: Digital download
Black Label XL 4 by Various Artists	Released: September 25, 2017; Label: Never Say Die: Black Label; Format: Digital download
Stay (The Remixes) by Delta Heavy and Dirty Audio	Released: January 24, 2018; Label: Monstercat; Format: Digital download
Black Friday Vol. 17 by Various Artists	Released: March 30, 2018; Label: Never Say Die: Black Label; Format: Digital download
Textacy (Remixes) by Dion Timmer	Released: June 26, 2018; Label: Rottun Recordings; Format: Digital download
The Drop (The Remixes Pt. 1) by Gammer	Released: July 3, 2018; Label: Monstercat; Format: Digital download
FuntCase Presents: DPMO, Vol. 2 by FuntCase	Released: September 28, 2018; Label: Circus Records; Format: Digital download
Pandora's Box by Tynan	Released: November 9, 2018; Label: Never Say Die; Format: Digital download
Slimeageddon by Snails	Released: December 7, 2018; Label: Slugz Music; Format: Digital download
Rott N' Roll Pt. 2: Remixed by Zomboy	Released: October 11, 2019; Label: Never Say Die; Format: Digital download
String Theory EP by Subtronics	Released: October 9, 2020; Label: Cyclops Recordings; Format: Digital download
Antifractals by Subtronics	Released: December 16, 2022; Label: Cyclops Recordings; Format: Digital download
Thrones of Blood by Sullivan King	Released: March 17, 2023; Label: Monstercat; Format: Digital download
Rise Up by Ganja White Night	Released: October 25, 2024; Label: SubCarbon; Format: Digital download

=== Charted singles ===
Title	Year	Peak chart positions		Album
Title	Year	US Dance Sales	US Dance	Album
"Island" (with Seven Lions and Trivecta featuring Nevve)	2019	20	—	Ophelia Volume 1
"Another Me" (with Seven Lions and Excision featuring Dylan Matthew)	2019	—	46	Evolution EP
"—" denotes a recording that did not chart or was not released.

=== Singles ===
Title	Year	Album	Label
"Contact" (with Charlie Zane)	2016	Non-album singles	Self-released
"Zip It" (with Jarvis)	2016	Non-album singles	Self-released
"DayDream" (with Jantsen)	2016	Non-album singles	Good Enuff
"Lucy In The Sky" (featuring Delaney Kai)	2016	Non-album singles	Self-released
"Give It Up" (with B-Sides and Jantsen)	2016	Non-album singles	Elysian Records
"Horns Up" (with Sunday Service)	2017	Non-album singles	Self-released
"WDGAF" (with AFK featuring Jay Fresh)	2017	Non-album singles	Self-released
"Back / Like I Used To" (featuring Eli Flynn)	2017	Non-album singles	Circus records
"Voodoo" (with Yookie)	2017	Non-album singles	Firepower Records
"Briddim Bomb" (with Kompany)	2018	Non-album singles	Circus Records
"Kong" (with Detrace)	2018	Black Friday Vol. 17	Never Say Die: Black Label
"Falling" (with Trivecta)	2018	Monstercat Uncaged Vol. 5	Monstercat
"WDGAF VIP" (with AFK)	2018	Non-album single	Self-released
"Elephant March" (with Mastadon featuring Travis Richter)	2018	Mammoth EP	Never Say Die
"Snailephant" (with Snails)	2018	Slimeageddon	Slugz Music
"Psyclone"	2019	Non-album singles	Welcome Records
"Nothing Left" (with William Black featuring Runn)	2019	Non-album singles	Ophelia
"Bussback" (with Kompany)	2020	Non-album singles	Never Say Die
"Don't Forget Me" (with Sullivan King)	2020	Non-album singles	Monstercat
"Erase You" (with Excision and Haliene)	2020	Non-album singles	Subsidia
"The Core"	2021	Non-album singles	Ophelia
"Shadows" (with Seven Lions and Amidy)	2021	Non-album singles	Ophelia
"Crazy" (with Codeko featuring Casey Cook)	2021	Resurrection EP	Ophelia
"Pantheon" (with Seven Lions, Jason Ross, Trivecta, Kill the Noise, Blastoyz, and Dimibo)	2021	Non-album single	Ophelia
"Light Up The Sky" (with Trivecta featuring Scott Stapp)	2021	Resurrection EP	Ophelia
"Crazy (Orchestral)" (with Codeko featuring Casey Cook)	2022	Non-album single	Ophelia
"Name Drop" (with Excision)	2022	Titans EP	Subsidia
"Restraint" (with Calcium)	2022	Non-album single	Hard Recs
"Let Me Go" (with Sullivan King)	2022	Thrones of Blood	Monstercat
"Titans" (with Excision)	2023	Titans EP	Subsidia
"Song of the Year" (with Kill the Noise)	2023	Non-album singles	Cyclops Recordings
"Reasons" (with Excision and The Devil Wears Prada)	2023	Non-album singles	Subsidia
"Rapid Fire" (with Ganja White Night and Excision featuring Eksman)	2024	Sprouted	SubCarbon

=== Remixes ===
Title	Year	Artist	Label
"Holdin' on to Me"	2016	Nghtmre	Self-released
"Gettin That"	2016	Dirty Audio and Rickyxsan	Self-released
"Super Saiyan"	2016	Dirt Monkey (featuring Harvey J)	Self-released
"Jotaro"	2016	Phiso	Self-released
"After All" (with Kompany)	2016	Slander and Yookie (featuring Jinzo)	Never Say Die
"After All" (with Kompany, VIP mix)	2017	Slander and Yookie (featuring Jinzo)	Never Say Die
"Her"	2017	Excision and Dion Timmer	Rottun Recordings
"Wicked Game"	2017	Ursine Vulpine	Self-released
"Stay"	2018	Delta Heavy and Dirty Audio (featuring Holly)	Monstercat
"Berzerk" (with Ivory)	2018	Dion Timmer (featuring MagMag)	Rottun Recordings
"The Drop"	2018	Gammer	Monstercat
"After Dark" (with Samplifire)	2018	Seven Lions and Blastoyz (featuring Fiora)	Ophelia
"Born to Survive" (with Ray Volpe)	2019	Zomboy (featuring Rx Soul)	Never Say Die
"Cruel Love"	2019	Kayzo (featuring Shybeast and Frank Zummo)	Ultra Records / Welcome Records
"Wasteland"	2020	Trivecta	Ophelia
"Into Pieces" (with Grabbitz)	2022	Subtronics	Cyclops Recordings
