= Ophelia Records =

American record label

- One of two official logos for Ophelia Records
- Founded: February 14, 2018; 8 years ago
- Founder: Seven Lions
- Genre: Dubstep, EDM
- Country of origin: United States
- Official website: opheliarecords.com

Ophelia Records is an American record label founded by Seven Lions in 2018. The record label releases various electronic dance music, including dubstep, psytrance, drum & bass, and melodic bass.

The label was announced on February 14, 2018, and two days later, on February 16, 2018, Ophelia Records had its first release, "Calling You Home" by Seven Lions featuring Runn. Seven Lions followed up this release with the two-track EP Ocean in collaboration with Jason Ross on March 30, 2018, and "Horizon" in collaboration with Tritonal and Kill the Noise on May 18, 2018.

Ophelia Records was Dancing Astronaut's 2021 label of the year. In an interview with Dancing Astronaut during the label's takeover of Electric Zoo in 2019, Seven Lions said, "My vision for Ophelia was just a place for me to put out my music, [But] everything changes. Within the last two or three months, our release schedule has gotten so busy that I’m struggling with where to put my [own] music."

In 2022, Seven Lions released his debut album 'Beyond The Veil' on Ophelia Records.

== Events ==
Ophelia Records hosts regular events at festivals in the United States and various concert venues.

In 2021, the label hosted its first tour "Pantheon". The tour featured Seven Lions alongside support from Blanke, Gem & Tauri, Jason Ross, Kill The Noise, Last Heroes, Trivecta, Wooli and Xavi.

Ophelia has hosted label takeovers at festivals including Electric Zoo, Imagine Music Festival, Escapade Music Festival, Nocturnal Wonderland and North Coast Music Festival.

== Artists ==
- Andrew Bayer
- Au5
- Blanke
- Feed Me
- Feint
- Jason Ross
- k?d
- Kill the Noise
- MitiS
- Seven Lions
- Trivecta
- Wooli
