= Ganja White Night =

Belgian dubstep duo

Background information
- Origin: Brussels, Belgium
- Genres: Dubstep; bass music
- Years active: 2008–present
- Label: SubCarbon
- Members: Bamby; Erwan
- Past members: LeBelgeElectrod (2008–2012)
- Website: ganjawhitenight.com

Ganja White Night is a Belgian dubstep duo formed in Mons in 2004, consisting of Benjamin "Bamby" Bayeul and Charlie "Erwan" Dodson. The duo publish music through SubCarbon Records, which they founded in 2009, and have released 12 albums starting with their self-titled debut in 2010. Ganja White Night have several animated music videos centered around the character Mr. Wobble, created by the group in 2016.

== History ==
Ganja White Night was formed in Mons, Belgium, by Benjamin "Bamby" Bayeul, Charlie "Erwan" Dodson, in 2004. François "LeBelgeElectrod" Volral joined in 2008. The group founded the digital label SubCarbon Records in 2009 and released their debut self-titled album the following year; LeBelgeElectrod left the group in 2012. Ganja White Night collaborate with a Belgian street artist known as Ebo on animated music videos centered around Mr. Wobble, the lead character of a fictional universe created by the group in 2016. In July 2019, the duo relocated to Los Angeles, California. Ganja White Night have collaborated with artists such as Subtronics, Liquid Stranger, Zeds Dead, GRiZ, Slander, Caspa, Datsik, Wooli, and Peekaboo.

== Discography ==
Studio albums

- Ganja White Night (2010)
- In The Garden (2011)
- Mystic Herbalist (2013)
- Ex Echo (2013) – with Simon Danhier
- Addiction (2014)
- Hybrid Distillery (2015)
- Mr. Wobble (2016)
- The Origins (2018)
- The One (2019)
- Dark Wobble (2021)
- Unity (2023)
- Sprouted (2025)

Extended plays / singles

- Strata (2015)
- Flava (2017) – with Boogie T
- Headband (2019) – with Subtronics
- Jungle Juice (2019) – with Liquid Stranger
- Dear Weed Man (Remix) (2020) – with Boogie T
- Ease Your Mind (2021) – with GRiZ
- Miss You (2021) – with Slander
- Ganja Tape (2024) – with Tape B
- Rise Up (2024) – with Wooli
- Who Set the World on Fire (2025) – with Stick Figure
