= Jason Ross (musician) =

American DJ and record producer (born 1989)

- Born: February 7, 1989 (age 37)
- Origin: Minneapolis, Minnesota, United States
- Genres: Progressive house; trance; dubstep; hardstyle(Since 2024); future bass
- Occupations: Disc jockey Record producer
- Years active: 2011 – present
- Labels: Anjunabeats, Ophelia
- Website: www.jasonrossofficial.com

Jason Elliot Ross (born February 7, 1989) is an American DJ and record producer. Currently living in Los Angeles, California, he is signed to UK-based record label, Anjunabeats, and Seven Lions' label Ophelia Records. He released his debut album, 1000 Faces, on January 24, 2020.

Jason Ross is best known for producing melodic bass, trance and progressive house music. In addition to originals, he has remixed Above & Beyond, Seven Lions, Illenium, SLANDER and Gryffin.

He has released singles and remixes for numerous electronic record labels. His first ever original release, ‘Nightfall’ came out on Darren Tate's trance record label Mondo Records in 2013. In 2014 Above & Beyond took notice of the budding producer and signed him to their Anjunabeats imprint, it was the label's first signing in two years. The 2014 DJMag Top 100 DJs poll included a comment from Above & Beyond mentioning Jason Ross as their breakthrough DJ / producer of 2014: “On the Anjunabeats side, Jason Ross is a real talent”. Several of his songs have been included in numerous compilation albums such as the Monster Tunes Miami 2014 and Anjunabeats Volume 12 compilations. Ross has been featured in performances by artists all across the industry, playing alongside both mainstream headliners like Tiesto and Avicii, and trance legends like Ferry Corsten, Markus Schulz, which "has allowed him to understand the art of reading crowds and always leave them wanting more."

As well as his solo releases, Ross has worked alongside other DJs and producers such as Above & Beyond, Wrechiski, Sunny Lax, and Jenaux. He has hosted a guest mix on Above & Beyond's Group Therapy Radio show which is broadcast to millions of people worldwide. Ross and Wrechiski's collaboration "Atlas" got its debut at Madison Square Garden during the Above & Beyond Group Therapy 100 event. It was described as "an instrumental record with a really powerful almost melancholic vibe" by British record producer Paul Oakenfold. On January 26, 2015, "Atlas" reached the number one spot on Beatport's trance music chart.

== Early life ==
Jason Ross grew up in Minneapolis, Minnesota. At a young age, around 12-years-old, he was introduced to electronic music for the first time. Originally trained as a classical and jazz musician, Jason switched gears early on when he heard ATB's "9PM (Till I Come)" and Darude's Sandstorm. He purchased the software, eJay and produced his first electronic album before he was a teenager. Jason attended San Diego State University where he began his first club residency at the Fluxx nightclub.

== Discography ==
=== Studio albums ===
List of studio albums
| Title | Details |
|---|---|
| 1000 Faces | Released: January 24, 2020; Label: Ophelia; Formats: Digital download |
| Atlas | Released: August 5, 2022; Label: Ophelia; Formats: Digital download |

=== Compilation albums ===
Selected compilations by Jason Ross
| Year | Compilation | Label |
|---|---|---|
| 2016 | Anjunabeats Worldwide 06 | Anjunabeats (July 29, 2016) |

=== Extended plays ===
| Title | Descriptions |
|---|---|
| Rooms | Released: 25 January 2019; Label: Anjunabeats; Format: Digital download |
| Convergence | Released: 21 May 2021; Label: Ophelia; Format: Digital download |
| See You Again (with Seven Lions) | Released: 7 January 2022; Label: Ophelia Records; Format: Digital download |

=== Singles ===
Selected original songs by Jason Ross
| Year | Title | Album | Label |
|---|---|---|---|
| 2013 | "Nightfall" | Non-album singles | Mondo Records |
| 2013 | "Augur" (with Digital Junkiez) | Non-album singles | Dubbed Records |
| 2014 | "Burma" | Non-album singles | Monster Tunes |
| 2014 | "Run Away" (featuring Kelley Jakle) | Non-album singles | Mondo Records |
| 2014 | "Good Love" (with Steve Brian) | Non-album singles | Enhanced Progressive |
| 2014 | "Elements" | Non-album singles | Anjunabeats |
| 2015 | "Atlas" (with Wrechiski) | Non-album singles | Anjunabeats |
| 2015 | "Cairo" | Non-album singles | Anjunabeats |
| 2015 | "Solaris" (with Jenaux) | Non-album singles | Anjunabeats |
| 2015 | "Ravenna" | Non-album singles | Anjunabeats |
| 2016 | "Frontier" (with Wrechiski) | Non-album singles | Anjunabeats |
| 2016 | "Coaster" | Non-album singles | Anjunabeats |
| 2016 | "Monarch" | Non-album singles | Anjunabeats |
| 2016 | "Me Tonight" (featuring Lauren Ray) | Non-album singles | Anjunabeats |
| 2016 | "Begin Again" | Anjunabeats Worldwide 06 | Anjunabeats |
| 2016 | "Amun" (with Ilan Bluestone) | Non-album singles | Anjunabeats |
| 2016 | "Meta" (with Ilan Bluestone) | Non-album singles | Anjunabeats |
| 2016 | "Valor" | Non-album singles | Anjunabeats |
| 2017 | "Higher Love" (with Seven Lions featuring Paul Meany) | Non-album singles | Anjunabeats |
| 2017 | "Onyx" | Non-album singles | Anjunabeats |
| 2017 | "I Will Be There" (featuring Lauren Ray) | Non-album singles | Anjunabeats |
| 2018 | "Through It All" (featuring Fiora) | Non-album singles | Anjunabeats |
| 2018 | "Ocean" (with Seven Lions featuring Jonathan Mendelsohn) | Non-album singles | Ophelia |
| 2018 | "The Sirens" (with Seven Lions) | Non-album singles | Ophelia |
| 2018 | "Into You" (featuring Karra) | Non-album singles | Ophelia |
| 2018 | "Many Days" | Non-album singles | Anjunabeats |
| 2018 | "Awaken" (with Cosmic Gate) | Non-album singles | Anjunabeats |
| 2018 | "East of Eden" | Rooms EP | Anjunabeats |
| 2018 | "Don't Give up on Me" (featuring Dia Frampton) | Non-album single | Ophelia |
| 2019 | "The Gorge" (with Dimibo) | Rooms EP | Anjunabeats |
| 2019 | "New Dawn" | Rooms EP | Anjunabeats |
| 2019 | "Shelter" (featuring Melanie Fontana) | Non-album singles | Ophelia |
| 2019 | "When the Night Falls" (with Fiora) | Non-album singles | Ophelia |
| 2019 | "One That Got Away" (with Dabin and Dylan Matthew) | Non-album singles | Ophelia |
| 2019 | "Known You Before" (with Seven Lions featuring Emilie Brandt) | 1000 Faces | Ophelia |
| 2020 | "1000 Faces" (with Dia Frampton) | 1000 Faces | Ophelia |
| 2020 | "For Love" | Non-album singles | Anjunabeats |
| 2020 | "Better Than Heaven" (with Slander featuring JT Roach) | Non-album singles | Gud Vibrations |
| 2020 | "One Look" (featuring Heather Sommer) | Non-album singles | Ophelia |
| 2020 | "Open Water" (featuring Heather Sommer) | Non-album singles | Ophelia |
| 2020 | "The Accord" | Non-album singles | Anjunabeats |
| 2020 | "Foolish Of Me" (with Seven Lions and Crystal Skies featuring Jonathan Mendelsohn) | Non-album singles | Ophelia |
| 2020 | "Intertwined" (featuring Runn) | Non-album singles | Ophelia |
| 2021 | "One More Day" (with Blanke featuring Chandler Leighton) | Non-album singles | Ophelia |
| 2021 | "Wild Ones" (with Nevve) | Non-album singles | Ophelia |
| 2021 | "Pantheon" (with Seven Lions, Trivecta, Wooli, Kill the Noise, Blastoyz, and Dimibo) | Non-album singles | Ophelia |
| 2021 | "After You" (with Gryffin and Calle Lehmann) | Alive | Darkroom |

=== Remixes ===
Selected remixes by Jason Ross, with label of track released
| Year | Song | Artist | Label |
|---|---|---|---|
| 2011 | "Heartbeat" | Chase Costello | Mondo Records (October 24, 2011) |
| 2013 | "Claymore" | Hydro Poison | Mondo Records (February 2, 2013) |
| 2014 | "Gravity" | Parker & Hanson | Anjunabeats (September 8, 2014) |
| 2015 | "Fly To New York" (remixed with Above & Beyond) | Above & Beyond (featuring Zoë Johnston) | Anjunabeats (September 4, 2015) |
| 2015 | "Alone Tonight" | Above & Beyond | Anjunabeats (December 16, 2015) |
| 2016 | "Creation" | Seven Lions (featuring Vök) | Casablanca Records (June 15, 2016) |
| 2016 | "Glorious" | Arty (featuring Blondfire) | Anjunabeats (July 29, 2016) |
| 2017 | "Atlas" (Jason Ross Future Edit) | Wrechiski and Jason Ross | Anjunabeats (February 17, 2017) |
| 2017 | "I Swear" | Dirty South (featuring Anima!) | Anjunabeats (June 9, 2017) |
| 2018 | "Needed You" | Illenium (featuring Dia Frampton) | Seeking Blue / Kasaya (June 18, 2018) |
| 2018 | "Dream in Color" | Haliene | Monstercat (October 10, 2018) |
| 2019 | "All You Need to Know" | Gryffin and Slander (featuring Calle Lehmann) | Darkroom / Geffen Records (June 14, 2019) |
| 2019 | "Sahara Love" | Above & Beyond (featuring Zoë Johnston) | Anjunabeats (July 9, 2019) |
| 2022 | "Rebound" | Arty and Mat Zo | Anjunabeats (January 26, 2022) |
