= Haliene =

American pop singer

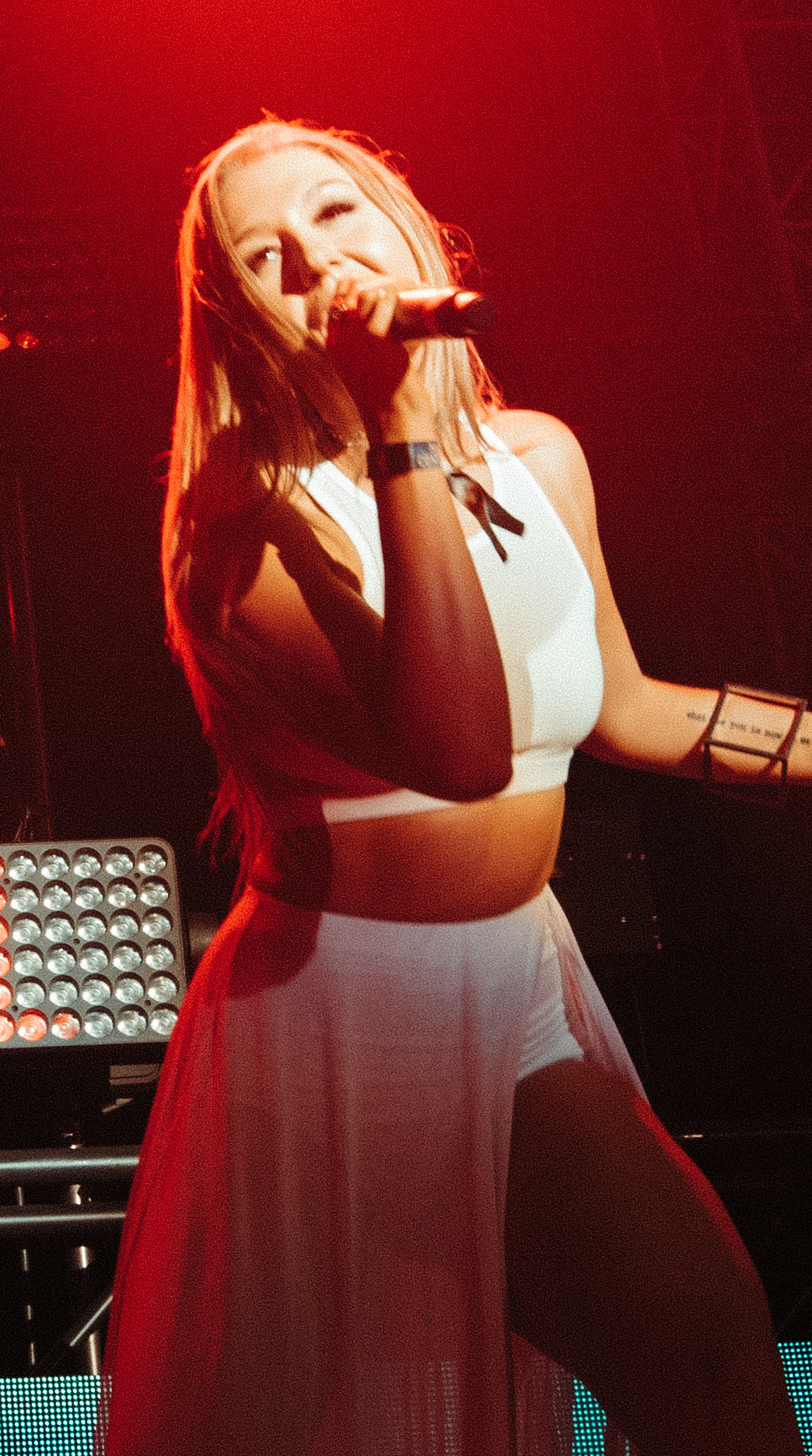
- HALIENE performing at EDC in Las Vegas 2017

Background information
- Born: Kelly Melissa Sweet; March 29, 1988 (age 38); Cape Cod, Massachusetts, U.S.
- Genres: Electropop; synth-pop; vocal trance; house; EDM; dubstep; future bass
- Occupation: Singer
- Instrument: Vocals
- Years active: 2006–2015 (as Kelly Sweet); 2015–present (as Haliene)
- Labels: Razor & Tie; Lakeshore; Enhanced; Monstercat; Armada Music; Casablanca
- Website: haliene.com

Kelly Melissa Sweet (born March 29, 1988), known professionally as Haliene (/ˈheɪliən/; stylized all caps), is an American singer of electropop and electronic dance music. She is known for her vocal collaborations with EDM artists Armin van Buuren, Seven Lions, ATB, Ferry Corsten, Aly & Fila, Da Tweekaz, and her song with Gareth Emery and Standerwick, "Saving Light", which won the A State of Trance award for "Tune of the Year".

== Early life ==
Sweet was born in Cape Cod, Massachusetts, on March 29, 1988, to pianist Jeffrey Howard Sweet and artist Candace Lynn Sweet. She was raised on the jazz standards that were part of her father's repertoire, and learned music as a child with her father's help. Her first public performance was when she was four years old at the Cape Cod Conservatory.

At the age of seven, following the divorce of her parents, Sweet and her mother moved to Kanab, Utah. She began working regularly with a vocal coach and honed her skills as a performer by singing at state fairs, county festivals, and community theatres. In the summers of 2000 and 2001, she studied musical theatre at Interlochen Center for the Arts Summer Arts Camp. Sweet and her mother eventually went on the road for two years, travelling back and forth between Kanab, Las Vegas and Los Angeles in search of performance opportunities. After hearing the 14-year-old Sweet's demo CD, the Los Angeles Lakers booked her to sing the National Anthem on three occasions.

== Career ==
In 2006, Sweet was featured in a USA Today article on up-and-coming "serious female singers." The same year, Sweet opened for Paul Simon on tour in July and October 2006, and her debut album, We Are One, was released by the Razor and Tie label on March 6, 2007. Her songs "We Are One" and "Ready For Love" have been used on episodes of two daytime dramas, the NBC TV series Passions and the ABC TV series One Life to Live, respectively. "We Are One" was also featured on the NBC series Las Vegas in the spring of 2007. She was the highest-charting indie label artist at the AC format in 2007 with airplay audience well exceeding 80 million. Remixes for "We Are One" were done by Dave Audé, Radioactive Sandwich, Matt Piso, and Electronathon. Her cover of the Aerosmith classic "Dream On" was No. 1 for six weeks in a row on the FMQB AC Chart.

Sweet's mother died from cancer on December 16, 2011. Less than six months later, June 4, 2012, her father succumbed to bone marrow cancer after eight years with the disease. Haliene was working on her second album during this difficult time and recalls, "I was 23 years old and I felt I stood amongst the ash of the dreams of my life. But, like a phoenix, I can rise again."

In August 2012, Sweet's second album, Ashes of my Paradise was released through Japan Victor Company. In 2013, she released her EP Sirens.

In January 2014, Sweet self-released a cover of the Phil Collins song "In the Air Tonight", and it was licensed by NBC Television for the promo adverts for their new show called Believe. The song was also featured in promo adverts for the Lifetime movie Petals on the Wind, an adaptation of the V.C. Andrews novel of the same name. In February 2015, the track was licensed for another NBC promo, this time for the Mark Burnett-produced A.D. The Bible Continues. The remix returned in a TV spot for the television series Gotham.

=== As Haliene ===
In 2015, Sweet changed her stage name to Haliene, releasing her first collaboration on March 3, The End with Seven Lions on Casablanca Records. She said her name was inspired from haleine, the French word for breath. She later worked with Seven Lions again on "Rush Over Me", a collaboration with Illenium and Said The Sky that reached number 50 on the Billboard Hot Dance/Electronic Songs chart.

She first performed live at Webster Hall, New York, March 5, 2015, with Seven Lions at his Throes of Winter release party. Haliene has since performed all over the world at venues such as the Red Rocks Amphitheatre, Bill Graham Civic Auditorium, Hollywood Palladium, San Jose City National Civic Arena, AFAS Live, O2 Academy, ExchangeLA, the Jakarta Colosseum and the Las Vegas Motor Speedway. In June 2017, she was the only singer to perform two times at the Electric Daisy Carnival with Illenium and Ferry Corsten at the festival which hosted over 400,000 attendees. In March 2018, she performed with Gareth Emery at Bill Graham Civic Auditorium to a sold-out crowd for his show "laserface".

Since her debut, Haliene has collaborated with many leading DJs and producers including: ATB, Blasterjaxx, Seven Lions, Illenium, Danny Avila, Slander, Project 46, Aly & Fila, Standerwick, and Ferry Corsten. Sabrina Clark from Dance & Rave named her "dance music's new favourite girl".

Haliene cites Ella Fitzgerald and Delerium as some of her inspirations, although her musical interests are "all over the place".

In November 2016, Haliene wrote the song "Saving Light" with Gareth Emery, Roxanne Emery, Karra and Matthew Steeper. It was released January 30, 2017, by the Canadian label, Monstercat. The song reached number one on the Beatport overall chart within a week of its release, becoming the first trance single to do so in 5 years. The artists partnered with the UK's largest anti-bullying charity Ditch the Label, launching a campaign titled after the song to raise money for the victims of bullying. On December 19, 2017, Armin van Buuren chose "Saving Light" as one of his top 50 tracks to comprise the 2017 trance mix album, A State of Trance 2017. van Buuren later concluded 4-hour radio show special with the announcement that Saving Light had won the "Tune of the Year" award by popular vote for his widely syndicated radio show A State of Trance. On May 26, 2017, Haliene released a collaborative science fiction-influenced trance album, Blueprint with Dutch DJ Ferry Corsten on his label Flashover Recordings. The album contains a storyline narrated by American actor Campbell Scott and illustrations from Canadian visual artist Oska. Haliene also voice-acted, contributing dialogue as the main female protagonist Vee. She collaborated with Corsten, singing on five tracks and contributed songwriting on six.

On February 2, 2018, she released Deep End, a collaboration with trance producer Standerwick on Armin van Buuren's imprint Armind Records. It was Tune of the Week on A State of Trance two weeks in a row.

Haliene released her first solo record Dream in Color, on Monstercat, April 3, 2018. This release marked Haliene as the first female artist to release a song on the label without it being a collaboration with another artist.

Her song "In My Mind", with Illenium and Excision, reached number 22 on the Hot Dance/Electronic Songs chart, and was a track on Illenium's Fallen Embers which received a Grammy nomination for Best Dance/Electronic Album.

In 2023, she was selected as the Artist of the Year (Female) at the second edition of the Electronic Dance Music Awards (EDMA) in Miami. She also won Artist of the Year (Female) at the EDMA in 2024.

== Personal life ==
Haliene is married to Matthew Steeper, who co-writes and co-produces her songs, plays piano, and manages on her tour.

== Discography ==
- Heavenly (2022)
- Eclipsed (2026)
