= Seven Lions =

American DJ (born 1987)

- Montalvo in 2015

Background information
- Also known as: DJ Sven (Psytrance alias)
- Born: Jeff Montalvo; March 31, 1987 (age 39); Santa Barbara, California, U.S.
- Genres: Melodic dubstep, electro house, progressive house, trance, glitch hop, psytrance
- Occupations: Musician, DJ, music producer
- Instruments: Drums, D.A.W. (FL Studio), turntables, synthesizer, guitar
- Years active: 2010–present
- Labels: Casablanca, Owsla, Viper Recordings, Anjunabeats, V2 Presents, Republic, Monstercat, Ophelia, Maron Music
- Website: www.sevenlions.com

Jeffrey Allen "Jeff" Montalvo (born March 31, 1987), known professionally as Seven Lions, is an American DJ, record producer, instrumentalist and remixer from Santa Barbara, California. Active musically since 2010, his music combines styles as diverse as trance, melodic dubstep, drum and bass, glitch hop, and electro house. He has released eight EPs, multiple singles, and official remixes for record labels such as Casablanca Records, Owsla, Viper Recordings, Anjunabeats, Republic Records and Monstercat.

His second EP Days to Come was mentioned by Vibe Magazine as one of their Top Electronic Albums of 2012, and it peaked at No. 10 on the Billboard Dance/Electronic Albums chart. His next EP, Worlds Apart, charted at No. 76 on The Billboard 200, and the EP's track "Don't Leave" with Ellie Goulding entered the UK Singles Chart in 2014. He tours regularly in the United States, and since 2012 has performed at festivals such as SXSW, Ultra Music Festival, Electric Daisy Carnival, Electric Zoo, and Camp Bisco. He was nominated for America's Best DJ, a competition held by DJ Times, in 2014. In 2018, Seven Lions founded Ophelia Records, an independent record label that releases various electronic dance music, including dubstep, psytrance, drum & bass, and melodic bass.

== Early life and education ==
Jeff Montalvo was born on March 31, 1987, in Santa Barbara, California. His interest in music production began at the age of 7, when his father came home with a Macintosh and keyboard. He also grew up playing bass and guitar, and after playing drums for several metal and punk-inclined bands, he eventually segued into electronic music production. Montalvo explains that accessibility was his initial reason for the shift, "because I got tired of waiting for my band all the time - I wanted to just start making music so I started composing electronic music by myself." After a friend gave him the Fruity Loops digital audio workstation, he started learning production.

In college, he developed an interest in the genre of trance after being handed an old Tiësto CD. At age twenty, he attended his first rave in 2007, which inspired him to focus on producing trance himself. Around 2010, he began releasing music under the moniker Seven Lions, mixing industrial drum beats with multiple genres. The name Seven Lions comes from the fantasy novel Soldier of the Mist by Gene Wolfe, who he names as his favorite author. Seven Lions is a character in the book.

== Musical career ==
=== 2011–2012: First remixes and EPs ===
One of his first releases was an unofficial remix of "Cosmic Love" by Florence and the Machine in March 2010. His remix was then included as part of the official single package for "Cosmic Love" by Moshi Moshi Records on July 5, 2010. Also in 2011, he released a remix of the song "Satellite" by Oceanlab. On a whim, Seven Lions entered the Above & Beyond official remix competition on Beatport in 2011, remixing their track "You Got To Go." The track sat at No. 2 on Beatport's Dubstep chart for over 6 weeks, largely underneath Skrillex’s remix of Avicii's "Levels." The track also won the remix competition, which led to Seven Lions becoming officially involved with Above and Beyond. The remix was officially released on their Anjunabeats label on December 21, 2011.

Seven Lions' first major tour started in March 2012, when he hit the UKF Tour with dubstep DJs Gemini and Koan Sound. During the tour, Seven Lions also supported Bassex. He also remixed the Above & Beyond track "On My Way To Heaven" in 2012. According to Mixmag, "His take on 'On My Way To Heaven' retained the original's euphoric opening before plunging into a maelstrom of super-sized beats and gurgling bass."

=== 2012: Polarize and Days to Come ===
His first EP Polarize was released on April 23, 2012, on the British drum and bass label Viper Recordings. The EP includes six tracks, which incorporate a blend of genres such as dubstep, drum and bass, and house. Shaz Sparks is a guest vocalist on three of the tracks. The EP was largely well-received, and his song, "Below Us" was featured as Zane Lowe’s ‘Hottest Record In The World,’ with Lowe writing about the song, "fresh sounding production marries an ethereal vocal with some clean tear out riffs." After releasing Polarize, Seven Lions had several Beatport No. 1s (four in the dubstep chart) in 2012, with remixes for artists such as Above & Beyond, Matrix & Futurebound, Paul Van Dyk and Delerium.

After Seven Lions' management passed some of his demos to the DJ Skrillex, Seven Lions was signed to release an EP on Skrillex's personal Owsla imprint. In October 2012, Seven Lions' released his Days to Come EP, with four tracks included. The title track features the vocals of Australian singer Fiora, and is the only dubstep song on the EP. Earmilk wrote that the song "pulls you in with the exquisite vocals and then hits you with that deep melodic bass." In contrast, the EP's song "The Truth" is progressive house, while "Fractals" incorporates electro house. The final track, "She Was," can be defined as glitch hop and features the band Birds of Paradise. Days to Come was mentioned by Vibe Magazine as one of their Top Electronic Albums of 2012. It peaked at No. 10 on the Billboard Dance/Electronic Albums chart and No. 13 on Heatseekers Albums chart in 2012, and landed at No. 2 on the US iTunes Dance Charts and No. 1 on Beatports' top 5 albums of the week.

=== 2013–2014: Singles ===
"Seven Lions' "Strangers" — the glitchy, peak-hour, rising-and-falling collaboration with Myon & Shane 45 [sic] — is a straight-up hit, a favorite of both bloggers and mix-show DJs."
— Rolling Stone on April 28, 2014

By late 2012, Seven Lions was receiving play by DJs such as Above & Beyond, Armin van Buuren, and Gareth Emery, among others. In May 2013, Mimi Page, Minnesota, and Seven Lions released their collaborative single "Fevers" on OWSLA. The single gained airplay on Sirius/XM BPM and Electric Area. A Seven Lions remix of the Röyksopp song "Running into the Sea" was released in July 2013. He supported Krewella on their Get Wet tour, which commenced in September 2013.

Seven Lions' collaborative single "Strangers" made its debut on the Mortal Instruments: City of Bones soundtrack. The album was released by Republic Records in stores and digital retailers on August 20, 2013, and peaked at No. 32 on the US Billboard 200. "Strangers" is a collaboration between trance DJs Myon & Shane 54, and features the vocalist Tove Lo. The song was officially released as a single on October 11, 2013, and went to No. 1 on SiriusXM BPM 51.

Seven Lions was the subject of a short documentary filmed by Jason Ano, which was released in December 2013. The video followed Seven Lions on tour and as he created music in his home studio. Throughout April and May 2014, Seven Lions toured in cities such as Austin, Calgary and San Francisco. A new version of his collaborative track "Strangers" was released on April 15, 2014, as a promo single for his upcoming EP, with Vice Media calling it "more epic and lush" than the original.

=== 2014: Worlds Apart ===
Seven Lions' Worlds Apart EP was released on April 29, 2014, on Casablanca Records. Among the EP's five tracks are "Don't Leave" with original vocals by Ellie Goulding, and "Worlds Apart" and "Keep It Close" with Estonian singer Kerli.

"[Worlds Apart goes] beyond the usual bang and boom of EDM and letting the songs wander into whatever genres they care to explore... Instrumental 'Nepenthe' wanders the most, running through Enigma-like exotica before the modern wubba-wubba of dubstep shakes the floor...
— David Jeffries of Allmusic

In an interview with Rolling Stone, Seven Lions described the EP as more experimental than his last EP, and stated that "the focus is on songwriting instead of pure dance-floor aggression." The EP combines diverse genes, with progressive house-style vocals and elements of trance, dubstep, bass music, and electro.

The EP charted at No. 76 on The Billboard 200, and No. 2 on Top Electronic Albums in the US. The single "Don't Leave" with Ellie Goulding entered the UK Singles Chart at number 141 on August 16, 2014. The EP was largely well received by critics, with Allmusic giving it a score of 3.5/5. Sputnik Music gave it a score of 4.2/5, and wrote "The painstaking care taken with every stuttered roar and every icy percussive hit is absolutely stunning."

External videos
- "Worlds Apart" Music Video feat. Kerli (Youtube, August 16, 2014)

In August 2013, also the music video for the Seven Lions and Kerli collaboration song Worlds Apart, where Kerli plays a mermaid in a story about "star crossed lovers."

=== 2014–2016: Recent projects ===
Seven Lions was the main support for Porter Robinson’s Circle Assembly tour, and since 2013 he has performed at festivals such as SXSW, Ultra Music Festival, Electric Daisy Carnival New York, and Camp Bisco, as well as headlining the Avalon Hollywood, Webster Hall New York City, and several other venues in the United States. He has a North American tour with Krewella and Candyland set for the fall of 2014. He was nominated for America's Best DJ in 2014. In the summer of 2014, he announced future projects, including an upcoming single for OWSLA, and an official remix of Röyksopp’s "Running to the Sea." In September 2014, he announced in an interview that he was working on an upcoming EP, as well as several singles.

A collaboration with Myon & Shane 54 and Tove Lo, titled "Strangers", made its debut on the Mortal Instruments: City of Bones soundtrack. Later that year, DJ Mag also revealed that he had placed No. 144th in voting for their annual Top 100 DJs poll, despite not campaigning. He also collaborated on a track with Polish producer Xilent via Owsla entitled "The Fall" which was released as a single.

He released a new EP, titled The Throes of Winter on March 3, 2015, via Casablanca Records. The EP features more guest appearances from singers than his previous releases, and features more tracks that are musically similar to his "Days To Come" EP, compared to the "Worlds Apart" EP which was a departure from his previous effort. In 2016, he released his Creation EP, which peaked at No. 1 on the Billboard Top Electronic Albums chart.

=== 2018–2019: Founding of Ophelia label and Start Again EP ===
His first dubstep single of 2019: "Island" with Wooli and Trivecta featuring Nevve, was released on January 4.

On February 14, 2018, Seven Lions announced on Twitter that he was establishing his own record label, Ophelia, which would be used as a platform to release his music. Since its launch, Ophelia has grown to include artists such as Kill the Noise, Wooli, and Jason Ross. On February 16, 2018, Seven Lions dropped single "Calling You Home" through Ophelia, making it the new label’s first release. On March 30, 2018, he released a two-track EP on Ophelia with Jason Ross titled Ocean, containing tracks "Ocean" and psy-trance-influenced "The Sirens". On May 18, 2018, Seven Lions collaborated with Tritonal and Kill The Noise to release "Horizon".

He released "Dreamin'" on July 13, 2018, which featured vocals from Australian singer Fiora. He worked again with Fiora on his next psytrance single, "After Dark", which was produced in collaboration with Israeli psytrance artist Blastoyz and released on August 10, 2018. These two songs were later featured in his four-track EP, Start Again, which was released on August 24, 2018. All four tracks on the EP featured Fiora's vocals.

On September 29, 2018, Seven Lions embarked on The Journey II Tour. Joined by the uplifting big-room sounds of Tritonal, and the dark experimental sounds of Kill The Noise, this tour delivered on a large scale of genres. These two artists helped to blend with Seven Lions' melodic sounds to create a rather diverse lineup. The second installment of the Chronicles series was also premiered on this tour, taking place at the Red Rocks Amphitheatre in Colorado.

On October 13, 2018, Seven Lions released the chillstep single "First Time" through Ophelia, which was produced together with Slander and Dabin. The song was premiered during his performance at the Bill Graham Civic Auditorium a week prior to its release.

Seven Lions and Psy-Trance duo Dimibo released their first track from their new Psy-Trance collaboration alias Abraxis on November 15, 2019, titled "Old Gods". The trio went on to perform their debut Abraxis set at Dreamstate SoCal 2019.

=== 2020-present: Find Another Way EP and Celebrating Classics ===
On March 27, 2020, Seven Lions released his first EP in 1.5 years titled Find Another Way on Ophelia Records. Working together with the likes of Au5, Crystal Skies, Tyler Graves, April Bender, and HALIENE, Seven Lions brought forth a 5-track collection of collaborations that once again pushed the bounds on his multi-genre aptitude.

On February 5, 2021, Seven Lions released his trance-influenced EP, Seven Lions: 1999 EP. This was a rather unique collection of work from Seven Lions, as it remixed many of his classic tracks into uplifting trance versions. Tracks such as "Days to Come", "Higher Love", "Rush Over Me", and "Worlds Apart" were all given an old-school trance makeover that embraced some of Seven Lions' musical influences. "Rush Over Me" and "Worlds Apart" also received extended editions. These tracks were first premiered in July 2020 during Seven Lions trance edition of his Livestream Visions.

Seven Lions' third installment of his curated events, the Chronicles series, took place on September 11, 2021, at The Gorge, Washington's famous amphitheater. Coming full circle from the first installment that took place in Seattle, this two-day immersive art and camping festival featured two stages and performances from many notable artists such as NGHTMRE, Abraxis, Jason Ross, Alpha 9, and more.

Seven Lions kicked off his Pantheon Tour on September 30, 2021. He announced this tour through a cryptic fill-in-the-blank message via his Twitter in June. The tour included the likes of Blanke, Gem & Tauri, Jason Ross, Kill The Noise, Last Heroes, Trivecta, Wooli, and Xavi, all notable Ophelia artists. They made stops at cities like Chicago, Austin, Washington, D.C., and Denver, showcasing their vast Ophelia discography along the way.

On December 22, 2021, Seven Lions teamed up with musical quartet Atlys to release the LP Opus. Continuing with his earlier trend of the year, this LP took many of Seven Lions' most popular songs and remastered them into classical orchestral performances. The idea was first introduced with Atlys performances during set intermissions at a Red Rocks show in Colorado. Upon seeing the approval from the crowd, the creation of the LP was started. The LP included orchestral remakes of "Only Now", "The Blood", "First Time", "Ocean", and more.

On June 10, 2022, Seven Lions released an album in celebration of ten years of creating music, 10 Years of Seven Lions. It features ten previously released tracks, and two new tracks, an acoustic version of "Rush Over Me" and a remix by Abraxis of "The Blood". In addition, he released a four-part documentary series to his YouTube channel.

On October 21, 2022, Seven Lions released his first album Beyond The Veil on Ophelia Records. The album release was followed by a deluxe edition and live DJ set in Lake Kachess, Washington in partnership with Amazon Music.

On December 12, 2025, Seven Lions released his second album Asleep in the Garden of Infernal Stars on Ophelia Records, consisting of 11 tracks and features that include Kerli, HALIENE and Lilly Ahlberg.

== Livestreaming ==
=== Visions ===
Seven Lions debuted his curated Livestream series Visions on May 28, 2020. The goal of these performances was to showcase Ophelia Records' talent in a method that allowed the artists to connect with fans regularly during a period in which little to no shows were being held due to the pandemic. The first of these live streams featured support performances from Ophelia's psytrance combo Dimibo, Trivecta, and Seven Lions' partner duo Gem & Tauri, as well as a main performance from Seven Lions himself.

=== The Gorge ===
On August 15, 2020, Seven Lions partnered with Insomniac Events to bring the fans a 3-hour Livestream from The Gorge, Washington's famous amphitheater. Seven Lions Chronicles series was scheduled to happen there the month before, but due to the pandemic had been canceled. This was Seven Lions' way of delivering a performance for the fans despite the situation. The Livestream included an opening set from Gem & Tauri, as well as a headlining performance from Seven Lions, both overlooking the beautiful backdrops of The Gorge.

== Style and equipment ==
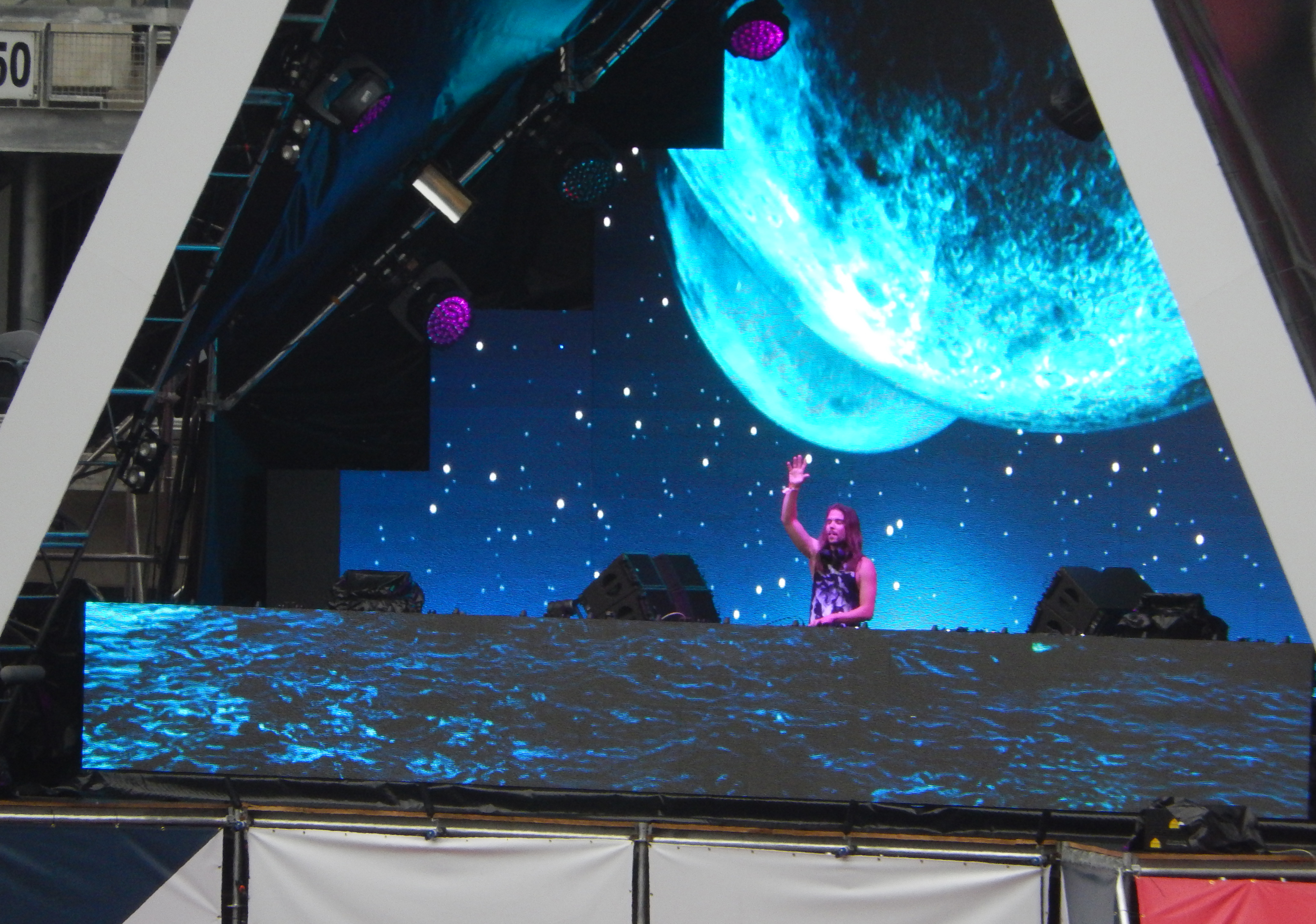
A live PA by Seven Lions at Spring Awakening in June 2015.

Seven Lions uses Image-Line's digital audio station FL Studio, and Image-Line has named him an official FL Power User. Among the analog equipment he uses as of June 2014: Dynaudio BM5A monitors.

Seven Lions' production style has been described by reviewers as trance, dubstep, bass music, and electro, though he incorporates other genres as well. When asked in 2013 how he would define his genre, he stated, "I like a little bit of everything to be honest, so I try and make a little bit of everything... I try and keep my style on what I want to do, so I have dubstep songs, glitch-hop, electro, trance."

Critics have in particular noted his blend of trance and dubstep. Thump clarified in April 2014 that "Seven Lions is currently one the biggest names in EDM, thanks to his unique and powerful brand of melodic, larger-than-life soundscapes that... mesh massive bass drops with emotional progressive-trance breakdowns." In 2014, Seven Lions' explained that "I think that whole dubstep/trance sound was basically just from having an open mind about different genres and realizing that most of the trance I liked was at 140 bpm and most dubstep I liked was at 140 bpm, so it naturally made sense."

Seven Lions' has described himself as a fan of "epic" music, and he is a long-time metal and fantasy fan, inspired by groups such as his favorite band Opeth. Although he produces electronic music, he doesn't always listen to it, unless actively looking for music to put into his DJ set. He has stated that "I’m always into Viking Metal, I like folky stuff. I like stuff that really takes you out of somewhere you are and puts you somewhere else." Among his favorite metal bands are Ensiferum, Månegarm, Opeth, and Storm Corrosion.

== Personal life ==
As of 2020, Seven Lions lives in Woodinville, Washington, with his wife Emma.

== Awards and nominations ==
Year	Award	Nominated work	Category	Result
2011	Beatport Remix Competition	"You Got To Go (Seven Lions Remix)"	Best Remix	Won
2014	America's Best DJ Competition	Seven Lions	America's Best DJ	Nominated

== Discography ==
- Beyond the Veil (2022)
- Asleep in the Garden of Infernal Stars (2025)

== See also ==
- List of dubstep musicians
- List of Republic Records artists
