= Barrio Fino World Tour =

2004–06 concert tour by Daddy Yankee

- Continental tour by Daddy Yankee
- Location: North America • South America
- Associated albums: Barrio Fino; Barrio Fino en Directo
- Start date: October 23, 2004
- End date: June 19, 2006
- Legs: 3
- No. of shows: 44 in total

Daddy Yankee concert chronology
- Barrio Fino World Tour (2004–06); The Big Boss Tour (2007–08)

The Barrio Fino World Tour was a concert tour by reggaetón singer Daddy Yankee to promote his third studio album, Barrio Fino (2004). This was his first stadium and arena tour, and his first major tour in the United States, becoming the first reggaetón act to embark on an American tour. The Barrio Fino tour visited Latin America and portions of the United States and consisted of three legs. In December 2005, Yankee released Barrio Fino en Directo, a live album of the tour; included on the compact-disc is also DVD footage of the concert filmed in Colombia, the Dominican Republic and Ecuador, and at Yankee's home shows in Puerto Rico.

== Background ==
Barrio Fino became the first reggaetón album to achieve platinum status in the United States, and would go on to selling over 1.5 million copies worldwide in its first year of release; the hit single "Gasolina", from the record, is credited with introducing reggaetón to the mainstream. To promote the album, Yankee embarked on a series of promotional presentations, and later announced his first proper world tour. This would also be his first major tour in the United States, making him the first reggaetón artist to do so.

The tour was the first arena tour by a reggaetón act in the United States, thus many high expectations were circulating prior to the beginning of the tour. Augustin Gurza from Los Angeles Times wrote and article titled "Yankee is coming, and coming strong; Daddy Yankee's solo U.S. tour could help solidify commercial appeal of reggaeton". On the article he stated. "If Yankee succeeds as a solo headline attraction, he will establish the commercial appeal of the genre. Observers say Yankee's success could open doors for other artists and encourage continued collaborations with mainstream English-language hip-hop stars, a linkage seen as crucial to reggaeton's future".

== Overview ==
The tour was, predictably, a massive success across Latin America and Spain. On December 13, 2004, Daddy Yankee Become the first music artist ever to have a concert in the Coliseo de Puerto Rico. The October 16, 2005 concert in Santo Domingo was a part of the Festival Presidente de la Música Latina (2005), with record attendance, and was televised live. Footage from both shows were used for his later live video/DVD release, Barrio Fino en Directo.

During the United States leg, the tour was renamed to the ¿Who's your Daddy? Tour. It officially kicked-off on August 27, 2005. Ticket prices were between $45 and $100. The February 17, 2006, concert in Miami, Florida, was, at the time, the first time a reggaetón concert was broadcast live in the United States, and the only one on pay-per-view. Following the success of the first portion of the tour, more dates in Latin America were added.

The February 26, 2006, concert in Valparaíso, Chile, was part of the Viña del Mar International Song Festival, and gave Daddy Yankee the distinction of being the first reggaetón artist to appear on the festival's stage. Daddy Yankee's performance at Viña del Mar, as is the festival's tradition, was broadcast live and is widely considered to be one of the best reggaetón/urbano performances in the history of the festival and genre. Yankee later returned to Viña for the 2009 and 2013 festivals as a headliner, as well. His two concerts in Honduras, a country not often visited by international musicians, had a combined attendance of over 40,000 fans, with around 25,000 in Tegucigalpa and 15,000 in San Pedro Sula, respectively, according to local media outlets and reports. Furthermore, around 90,000 fans in total attended Daddy Yankee's performance at the Evento 40 Festival (2006) in Mexico City; his own concert at the Estadio Azteca, Zapopan, saw an additional 13,000. According to some sources, 18,000 fans attended the San José, Costa Rica, concert at Saprissa Stadium. His show in Santiago de Chile was sold out with 13,000 tickets sold. In Nicaragua, another rarely-visited country by artists on tour, his show was attended by more than 20,000 fans.

The total attendance of the tour's third leg was nearly 200,000 fans.

== Set list ==
This set list is from the 10 June 2006 show at Estadio San Marcos, in Lima, Perú. It is not intended to represent every show.

1. "King Daddy"
2. "Dale Caliente"
3. "Machete”
4. "Seguroski"
5. "Yo Voy" (Zion & Lennox cover)
6. "Tu Príncipe" (with Zion & Lennox)
7. "No Me Dejes Solo"
8. "Mírame"
9. "Corazones" (Intro)
10. "Corazones"
11. "Métele con Candela"
12. "Oye Mi Canto" (with N.O.R.E. & Nina Sky)
13. "Aquí Está Tu Caldo"
14. "Machucando"
15. "Lo Que Pasó, Pasó"
16. "Rompe"
17. "Gasolina"
18. "Cochineando" (with Cochinola)
19. "Gangsta Zone" (with Snoop Dogg)

== Tour dates ==
| Date | City | Country | Venue |
Leg 1 – Americas
| October 23, 2004 | Santo Domingo | Dominican Republic | Palacio de los Deportes Virgilio Travieso Soto |
| October 27, 2004 (Note: This concert was part of the Megaton 2004) | New York | United States | Madison Square Garden |
| December 13, 2004 | San Juan | United States | Coliseo de Puerto Rico |
| December 31, 2004 (Note: This concert was part of Party of Torres de Sabanas) | Carolina | United States | Residencial Torres de Sabanas |
| April 10, 2005 (Note: This concert was part of the Megaton music festival 2005 co-headlined by Don Omar and N.O.R.E) | The Woodlands | United States | C.W. Mitchell Pavillon |
| April 16, 2005 (Note: This concert was part of El Mega Concerto 2005) | Ciudad de México | México | Zócalo |
Leg 2 – Americas
| July 30, 2005 | Dallas | United States | Annette Strauss Artist Square |
| August 27, 2005 (Note: This concert was co-headlined with Carlos Vives) | New York City | United States | Madison Square Garden |
| September 2, 2005 | Quito | Ecuador | Coliseo General Rumiñahui |
| September 3, 2005 | Guayaquil | Ecuador | Estadio Modelo Guayaquil |
| September 9, 2005 | Los Angeles | United States | Staples Center |
| September 10, 2005 | San Diego | United States | Cox Arena |
| September 23, 2005 | Boston | United States | Agganis Arena |
| September 24, 2005 | Uncasville | United States | Mohegan Sun |
| September 25, 2005 | Houston | United States | Toyota Center |
| September 30, 2005 (Note: Co-headlined by Reggeton Duo Zion & Lennox) | Fairfax | United States | Patriot Center |
| October 1, 2005 (Note: This concert was Co-Headlined by Zion & Lennox) | Orlando | United States | TD Waterhouse |
| October 2, 2005 | Dallas | United States | Smirnoff Amphitheater |
| October 7, 2005 (Note: This concert was Co-headlined by reggaeton Duo Zion & Lennox) | Miami | United States | American Airlines Arena |
| October 8, 2005 | Chicago | United States | Allstate Arena |
| October 12, 2005 (Note: This concert was part of Son Festival 2005) | Caracas | Venezuela | Estadio Olímpico |
| October 16, 2005 (Note: This concert was part of the Festival Presidente 2005) | Santo Domingo | Dominican Republic | Estadio Olimpico Felix Sanchez |
| October 22, 2005 | Bogotá | Colombia | Estadio El Campín |
| November 25, 2005 (Note: This Concert was part of the MEGATÓN 2005 Latin Music Festival) | New York | United States | Madison Square Garden |
| December 16, 2005 | San Salvador | El Savador | Anfiteatro de la Feria Internacional |
| December 23, 2005 (Note: this concert was part of Party de San Jose) | San Jose | United States | Residencial San Jose |
| December 24, 2005 (Note: this concert was part of Party of Barbosa) | Bayamon | United States | Residencial José Celso Barbosa |
Leg 3 – Americas
| February 17, 2006 | Miami | United States | American Airlines Arena |
| February 26, 2006 (Note: this concert was part of the XLVII Viña del Mar International Song Festival) | Valparaíso | Chile | Quinta Vergara Amphitheater |
| March 26, 2006 (Note: This concert was named Reggaeton Hip Hop Live Co-Headlined with Snoop Dogg) | Inglewood | United States | The Forum |
| April 5, 2006 (Note: This concert was part of the Evento Planeta 2006) | Zapopan | México | Auditorio Benito Juárez |
| April 6, 2006 (Note: This concert was part of El Evento 40 2006 festival) | Ciudad de México | México | Estadio Azteca |
| May 14, 2006 | Veracruz | México | Explanada del Auditorio Benito Juárez |
| May 16, 2006 | Ciudad de México | México | Salon 21 |
| May 17, 2006 | Ciudad de México | México | Salon 21 |
| May 18, 2006 | Torreón | México | Estadio Municipal Gómez |
| May 20, 2006 | Guadalajara | México | Plaza de Toros |
| May 21, 2006 | Monterrey | México | Anfiteatro Fundidora |
| May 24, 2006 | Guatemala | Guatemala | Estadio Mateo Flores |
| May 26, 2006 | San Salvador | El Salvador | Estadio Flor Blanca |
| May 27, 2006 | Managua | Nicaragua | Estadio Nacional Denis Martínez |
| June 8, 2006 | San José | Costa Rica | Estadio Saprissa |
| June 10, 2006 | Lima | Perú | San Marcos University Stadium |
| June 12, 2006 | Santiago | Chile | Arena Santiago |
| June 14, 2006 | Ciudad de Panamá | Panamá | Centro de Convecciones Figali |
| June 17, 2006 | San Pedro Sula | Honduras | Estadio General Francisco Morazán |
| June 18, 2006 | Tegucigalpa | Honduras | Estadio Chochi Sosa |

=== Box office data ===
| City | Country | Attendance | Box office |
|---|---|---|---|
| San Juan | United States | 6,340 / 8,580 (74%) | $367,322 |
| New York City | United States | 9,062 / 14,584 (62%) | $578,575 |
| New York City | United States | 13,820 / 14,955 (92%) | $1,023,810 |
| The Woodlands | United States | 15,731 / 15,731 (100%) | $500,980 |
| Los Angeles | United States | 7,539 / 9,582 (79%) | $585,022 |
| Fairfax | United States | 7,375 / 9,193 (80%) | $511,235 |
| Miami | United States | 8,138 / 11,464 (71%) | $483,902 |
| Orlando | United States | 7,922 / 10,749 (74%) | $493,230 |
| Inglewood | United States | 6,988 / 12,166 (57%) | $589,714 |
| Totals | | 82,915 / 106,954 (78%) | $5,133,790 |
