= Talento de Barrio Tour =

2009 concert tour by Daddy Yankee

Talento De Barrio World Tour
- Continental tour by Daddy Yankee
- Location: South America • North America
- Associated albums: Talento de Barrio
- Start date: January 31, 2009
- End date: December 15, 2009
- Legs: 2
- No. of shows: 26 in South America; 12 in North America; 39 total
- Attendance: 300,000+

Daddy Yankee concert chronology
- The Big Boss Tour (2007–08); Talento de Barrio World Tour (2009); Mundial Tour (2010–11)

The Talento de Barrio World Tour was the third concert tour by reggaeton singer Daddy Yankee to promote his album Talento de Barrio. The tour had two legs, the first in the United States and the last one in Latin America. It kick of at Viña del mar 2009 international festival and ended at Mar de Plata, Argentina on December 15, 2009.

== Background ==
By 2009, Barrio Fino, Barrio Fino en Directo and El Cartel: The Big Boss, sold over 7 million of copies worldwide and also the top selling Latin albums in the United States of 2005, 2006 and 2007. Talento de Barrio was a box office success in Puerto Rico, breaking records in attendance. The soundtrack was commercial success and was quickly certified platinum in the United States and gold across Latin America.

== Reception ==
During the first leg of the tour in the United States, Yankee performed in smaller venues than his previous tour, the Big Boss Tour, which consisted of larger arenas but received mixed responses from the audiences.

In 2009, at the concert held in Colombia with Aventura, an attendance of over 30,000 fans was reported, while in Santo Domingo, an attendance of around 60,000 fans was reported. In Cordoba, attendance was reported of over 10,000 fans. In Chile, attendance was more than 25,000 fans. In Neuquen, Argentina attendance was 18,000. In Antofagasta, Chile, was around 12,000. The overall attendance of the second leg was 300,000 fans.

== Tour dates ==
Date	City	Country	Venue
The Americas
January 31, 2009 (Note: This concert was part of Solid Festival 2009)	Caracas	Venezuela	La Rinconada Hippodrome
March 13, 2009	Atlantic City	United States	Trump Taj Mahal
March 14, 2009	Wallingford	United States	Toyota Presents the Oakdale Theatre
March 15, 2009	Washington D.C	United States	DAR Constitution Hall
March 27, 2009	New York	United States	Roseland Ballroom
March 28, 2009	Boston	United States	Orpheum Theatre Boston
May 1, 2009	Willemstad	Curacao	Hopi Bon
May 2, 2009 (Note: This concert was part of Festival de la Leyenda Vallenata)	Valledupar	Colombia	Parque de la Leyenda Vallenata
May 16, 2009 (Note: This concert was part of Music Hall 2009)	San Juan	Puerto Rico	Puerto Rico Convention Center
May 23, 2009 (Note: This concert was part of BVI Music Festival 2009)	Tortola	British Virgin Islands	Cane Garden Bay
June 12, 2009	Oranjestad	Aruba	Don Elias Mansur Ballpark
June 27, 2009	Villavicencio	Colombia	Estadio Bello Horizonte
July 1, 2009	Cordoba	Argentina	Coliseo Orfeo
July 2, 2009	Cordoba	Argentina	Coliseo Orfeo
July 4, 2009	Buenos Aires	Argentina	Estadio Diego Armando Maradona
July 5, 2009	Montevideo	Uruguay	Estadio Charrua
July 12, 2009 (Note: This concert was part of the Third edition of Cumbre de Reggaeton)	Santiago	Chile	Estadio Bicentenario de la Florida
July 14, 2009 (Note: This concert was part of Maraton de Reggaeton III)	Coquimbo	Chile	Estadio Sanchez Rumoroso
July 16, 2009	Panama City	Panama	Figali Convention Center
August 1, 2009 (Note: This performance was part of Segundo Festival Internacional de la Frontera)	Cucuta	Colombia	Estadio General Santander
August 7, 2009 (Note: This concert was co-headlined by Aventura)	Medellin	Colombia	Estadio Atanasio Girardot
August 8, 2009	Santa Cruz	Bolivia	Estadio Tahuichi Aguilera
August 9, 2009	Cochabamba	Bolivia	Estadio Felix Crapiles
August 11, 2009	La Paz	Bolivia	Estadio Hernando Siles
August 21, 2009	Monterrey	Mexico	Arena Monterrey
August 27, 2009 (Note: The Concert of August 27, 2009 was part of Yellowpass 2009)	Mayaguez	Puerto Rico	
September 26, 2009	Manugua	Nicaragua	Estadio Nacional Denis Martínez
Leg 2 - South America
October 3, 2009 (Note: This concert was part of the Idolos Latinos 2009)	Santo Domingo	Dominican Republic	Estadio Olimpico Felix Sanchez
October 10, 2009 (Note: The Concert of October 10, 2009 was part of BRAHMA URBAN DANCE 3)	Lima	Peru	Estadio Universidad San Marcos
October 11, 2009	Viña del Mar	Chile	Quinta Vergara Amphitheater
October 12, 2009	Antofagasta	Chile	Club Hipico
October 15, 2009	Copiado	Chile	Estadio Luis Valenzuela Hermosilla
November 8, 2009 (Note: This concert was co-headlined by Aventura)	Cali	Colombia	Estadio Pascual Guerrero
November 10, 2009 (Note: This concert was part of the 40 principales festival)	Ciudad de Mexico	Mexico	Estadio Azteca
November 12, 2009	Ciudad de Mexico	Mexico	Palacio de los Deportes
November 13, 2009	Guadalajara	Mexico	Foro Alterno de la UdeG
November 15, 2009 (Note: The concert of November 15, 2009 was Co-headlined Aventura)	Cartagena	Colombia	Estadio Jaime Morón
December 8, 2009	Buenos Aires	Argentina	Estadio de Ferro
December 10, 2009	Neuquen	Argentina	Casino Magic
December 11, 2009	Asuncion	Paraguay	Club Olimpia
December 13, 2009	Mendoza	Argentina	Estadio Andres Talleres
December 15, 2009	Mar Del Plata	Argentina	Estadio Polideportivo "Islas Malvinas"

=== Attendance ===
City	Attendance
Guadalajara	7,000
Managua	10,000
Santiago	20,000
Monterrey	6,600
Medellin	30,000
Cordoba	10,000+
Cochabamba	20,000
Santo Domingo	50,000
Medonza	10,000
Antofagasta	12,000
Neuquen	18,000
Total	180,000

== Cancelled shows ==
List of cancelled concerts, showing date, city, country, venue, and reason for cancellation
Date	City	Country	Venue	Reason
April 3, 2009	Miami	United States	James L. Knight International Center	Breach of Contract
April 4, 2009	Orlando	United States	House of Blues	Breach of Contract
April 5, 2009	Tampa	United States	USF Sun Dome	Breach of Contract
October 17, 2009	Maracaibo	Venezuela	Centro Comercial Lago Mall	Low ticket sales due to concerns
October 18, 2009	Caracas	Venezuela	CCTT Caracas	Low ticket sales due to concerns
October 24, 2009	Guatemala City	Guatemala	Centro Comercial Tikal Futura	Breach of contract
