= Like You (Daddy Yankee song) =

2005 single by Daddy Yankee

Single by Daddy Yankee

from the album Barrio Fino
- A-side: "Gasolina"
- Released: March 9, 2005
- Recorded: 2004
- Genre: Reggaeton; R&B; tropical
- Length: 3:22
- Label: El Cartel
- Songwriters: Raymond Ayala; Eddie Ávila
- Producer: Luny Tunes

Daddy Yankee singles chronology
| "Lo Que Pasó, Pasó" (2004) | "Like You" (2005) | "Rompe" (2005) |

"Like You" is a song by Puerto Rican rapper Daddy Yankee from his third studio and first commercially released album Barrio Fino which was highly responsible for reggaeton's mainstream exposure in 2004. It was co-written by Daddy Yankee and Eddie Ávila in the English language, and produced by Luny Tunes. The song was released as the album's sixth single internationally. In the United States, the song was successful in the mainstream market but could not rank on Latin charts due to language barriers.

== Background ==
"Like You"'s parent album, Barrio Fino, is regarded as a major factor in reggaeton mainstream exposure to English-speaking markets in 2004 along with Ivy Queen's Diva and Real and Tego Calderon's El Enemy de los Guasíbiri. Barrio Fino was named the best-selling Latin album and tropical album by Billboard of the 2000s decade. The album was also the first reggaeton album to reach number one on the Top Latin Albums chart. Daddy Yankee's "Gasolina" also from the album is attributed with being the reggaeton song that launched reggaeton into mainstream accounts gaining airplay in not only the United States, but around the world, peaking at number 32 of the Billboard Hot 100, something no other reggaeton song at the time had been able to do.

== Composition ==
On the review of the album, Jason Birchmeier of AllMusic noted "Like You"'s "English-language crossover" potential. It was written by Yankee along with Eddie Ávila. Lyrically, Yankee is explaining to his love interest that she is the only girl for him, citing the way she makes him feel as a reason why. Despite the lyrical profanity used in the form of the words "fuck" and "ass" on "Like You" and other tracks such as "Santifica Tus Escapularios", Barrio Fino was not labeled and shipped with the Parental Advisory warning sticker.

== Release and chart performance ==
The song was released in 2005 along with "Gasolina" in the United Kingdom and Belgium. "Like You" peaked at number one on the Billboard Bubbling Under Hot 100 for the issue week of June 11, 2005. On the Billboard Hot 100, the song debuted for the week of June 18, 2005, and peaked at number 78 for the week of July 2, 2005, becoming his second most successful single in the United States of 2005. On the Billboard Pop 100, the song debuted on the week of June 11, 2005, and peaked at number 59 for the week of July 30, 2005.

On the Billboard Pop 100 Airplay chart, the song debuted a week after debuting on the Pop 100 and peaked on the chart at number 32 for the week of July 30, 2005. On the Billboard Rhythmic Top 40, the song debuted for the week of June 18, 2005, and peaked at number 26 for the week of July 2, 2005. On the Billboard Rap Songs chart, the song debuted for the week of June 18, 2005, reaching its peak position of number 22 for the issue week of July 2, 2012.

== Charts ==
| Chart (2005) | Peak position |
|---|---|
| CIS (Tophit) | 52 |
| US Billboard Hot 100 | 78 |
| US Billboard Latin Rhythm Airplay | 34 |
| US Radio Songs (Billboard) | 65 |
| US Pop 100 (Billboard) | 59 |
| US Pop 100 Airplay (Billboard) | 32 |
| US Rhythmic Top 40 (Billboard) | 26 |
| US Rap Songs (Billboard) | 22 |
