= Talento de Barrio (soundtrack) =

2008 soundtrack album by Daddy Yankee

Studio album / Soundtrack album by Daddy Yankee
- Released: August 12, 2008
- Recorded: 2005; 2007–08 at El Cartel Records, Puerto Rico
- Genres: Reggaeton; hip-hop
- Length: 54:08
- Labels: Machete; El Cartel 280020
- Producers: Daddy Yankee (exec.); Los De La Nazza; Luny Tunes; Tainy; Diesel; Echo

Daddy Yankee chronology
El Cartel: The Big Boss (2007)	Talento de Barrio (2008)	Mundial (2010)

Alternative cover
- Promotional EP

Singles from Talento de Barrio
- 1. "Somos de Calle" Released: March 1, 2008; 2. "Pose" Released: May 14, 2008; 3. "Llamado de Emergencia" Released: September 23, 2008; 4. "¿Qué Tengo Que Hacer?" Released: January 19, 2009

Talento de Barrio (English: Hood Talent) is the soundtrack album to the film of the same name and the fifth studio album starring Puerto Rican reggaeton musician Daddy Yankee, who also performs the songs on the album. It was released on August 12, 2008, by Machete Music and El Cartel Records, to accompany the motion picture Talento de Barrio. The album was mainly produced by reggaeton producers Eli El Musicólogo and Menes. It received positive reviews and was nominated for Best Urban Album at the 10th Annual Latin Grammy Awards. The album was supported by four official singles: "Somos de Calle", "Pose", "Llamado de Emergencia", and "¿Que Tengo Que Hacer?"

The album was a commercial success, selling over a million copies worldwide. In the United States, the album debuted at the top of the Billboard Top Latin Albums chart, and received a double platinum (Latin Field) certification from the RIAA for selling an excess of 200,000 copies, platinum in Argentina and Central America.

.Following the success of the album, Daddy Yankee was named by CNN as the Most Influential Hispanic Artist of 2009, and was the most searched artist on Google in Argentina of 2009.To promote the album, Yankee embarked on his third official world tour, Talento de Barrio Tour

== Background ==
Daddy Yankee recorded the movie Talento de Barrio between March and June 2005. It was his first film role as the main character. In the same year, he started to record the soundtrack, recording the tracks "Somos de Calle" and "No es Culpa Mia", produced by Luny Tunes. The trailer was released on the DVD Barrio Fino en Directo on December 13, 2005. According to Yankee, the movie was set to be released in mid-2006 and was going to be distributed by Paramount Pictures. Later, he stated that the new release date of the movie would be in October 2007, along with the soundtrack. However, the movie was released on July 13, 2008, independently via separate distribution agreements in various countries.

The official recording sessions of the album started in December 2007, following the first leg of his The Big Boss Tour. According to Yankee, he was "more relaxed and without restlessness" during the production of the album, since he had total control as executive producer, unlike his last album, El Cartel: The Big Boss (2007), co-produced with Interscope.

A promotional EP was released with five tracks, including "Block Party" with Yaga & Mackie, which was leaked online before its official radio release; "Talento de Barrio" remix with De la Guetto, Randy and Arcángel; and two promotional singles, "La Fuga" and "Solido". The latter two were included on the Best Buy exclusive edition of the soundtrack.

In the same year, Yankee signed two music producers, Musicologo and Menes, to his label. Musicologo and Menes formed the duo Los de la Nazza and produced most of the album. It was recorded on Mas Flow Inc Studios, with the participation of Predikador, Tainy and Luny Tunes.

== Musical style ==
According to the artist, the album explores a wide array of musical styles. It has an overall urban-R&B vibe, and also has many different musical styles like dance music, salsa, bachata and reggaeton. The album did not follow the crossover trend of his previous album El Cartel: The Big Boss (2007), and did not include English-language tracks.

During the recording seasons, Yankee expressed his desire to record a more hardcore reggaeton album. Although all the songs on Talento de Barrio are different in musical style, they all revolve around the same subjects of the film. The film relates the struggles young people face when they try to improve their lives and break free from their troubled surroundings. The lead single, "Pose", presents a mix of hip-hop and dance, with Latin and African American rhythms. "Llamado de Emergencia" is a vallenato-pop-influenced track, "Que Tengo Que Hacer" is dancehall, and "Somos de Calle" and the title track are hip-hop.

When I'm at shows, I see almost everyone with a camera, and they're all trying to give the best pose, especially the women. It's interesting to me how we're always trying to look good. That's the inspiration for the song.

— Raymond Ayala

== Promotion ==
Several songs, including "Sólido" and "Somos de Calle", were uploaded to Daddy Yankee's Myspace profile several months before the release of the soundtrack. Released as free single downloads at the time, they were not announced as being part the soundtrack until mid-summer 2008, when promotion of the film Talento de Barrio was disclosed. The planned musical style of the soundtrack would not be recognized until May 2008, when Daddy Yankee released the soundtrack's first single "Pose". The purpose for the soundtrack was to promote the film. A planned re-release, entitled Daddy Yankee Mundial, became his next studio album.

Following the release of the album, Yankee embarked on a series of public and personal appearances, similar to the previous promo cycle of El Cartel: The Big Boss. This includes TV shows with large Hispanic audiences such as Don Francisco Presenta and El Show del Cristina. Some songs of the soundtrack, such as "Somos de Calle" and "Pose", were included in the set list of the last leg of The Big Boss Tour.

In October 2008, Daddy Yankee's cologne began being sold by Macys, and was promoted by TV ads accompanied with the music of the lead single, "Pose". In November 2008, "Pose" also aired on ABC's Ugly Betty.

== Critical reception ==
Professional ratings
Review scores
Source	Rating
AllMusic	4/5 stars
Billboard	(favorable)

Talento de Barrio received mostly positive reviews by critics. Jason Birchmeier from AllMusic compared the album favorably to Yankee's previous album and stated, "Talento de Barrio is an all-around better album than El Cartel: The Big Boss. Not only is it more stylistically consistent and more reasonably paced at 15 songs in less than an hour's time; most importantly, it sticks with what's already proven successful".

== Commercial reception ==
=== Album ===
In the United States, the album debuted at the top of the Billboard Latin Albums and Latin Rhythm Albums charts, selling 26,000 copies in the first week. The soundtrack became a major debuting success on the Billboard 200, peaking at number 13. It dropped to number 23 the week after, and eventually to number 35. Its final charting position was at number 191, as of December 13, 2008. As of April 2009, it had sold over 170,000 copies. Eventually, it was certified two times platinum (Latin Field) by RIAA for selling over 200,000 copies in the United States. It also entered in the top 5 of the Billboard Top Soundtracks chart, peaking at number 3, becoming Daddy Yankee's first entry into the top 5 of this chart. The soundtrack is also Yankee's fourth consecutive number-one album on the Billboard Top Latin Albums chart.

The album debuted with 122,000 copies worldwide. It was a commercial success across Latin America and was certified gold in Peru. In Argentina, the album debuted and peaked at number 5. It was certified platinum for selling over 40,000 copies, and was the 7th best-selling album of 2009 in the country. In Central America, Talento de Barrio was certified gold for selling over 5,000 copies and 250,000 digital downloads. In Venezuela, it debuted and peaked at number one of the retail album charts, according to Recordland. It peaked at number 28 on Mexico's album charts and number 12 in Ecuador.

=== Singles ===
The lead single, "Pose", was released digitally via Myspace on May 14, 2008, and officially released to online music stores on the day of the album's release. It is the most successful charting single from the album, peaking at number 4 on the U.S. Billboard Hot Latin Songs chart in August 2008.

A promotional single, "Somos de Calle", was released as a radio promo in mid-summer 2008. It was released online, along with its video. Though not as successful as the album's lead single, the song still gets video play on music video television networks, as well as minor airplay. The video, as well as the lyrics, is more like the film in subject matter.

The second single, "Llamado de Emergencia", was released on September 23, 2008. A vallenato-pop-influenced track, the single made a modest debut at number 26 on the Billboard Hot Latin Songs chart, and peaked at number 21. The third single, "¿Qué Tengo Que Hacer?", was released on January 19, 2009. It peaked at number 11 on the Billboard Latin Rhythm Airplay chart.

== Track listing ==
No.	Title	Length
1.	"Talento de Barrio"	3:07
2.	"Pa-Kum-Pa!!"	3:20
3.	"Temblor"	3:15
4.	"Pose"	3:37
5.	"Llamado de Emergencia"	3:59
6.	"Oasis de Fantasía"	3:05
7.	"Salgo pa' la Calle" (featuring Randy)	4:27
8.	"¿Qué Tengo Que Hacer?"	3:38
9.	"Suelta"	3:29
10.	"De la Paz y de la Guerra"	3:56
11.	"Pasión" (featuring Arcángel)	3:55
12.	"Come y Vete"	3:41
13.	"K-ndela"	3:41
14.	"Infinito"	3:16
15.	"Somos de Calle"	3:14
Total length:		54:08

Best Buy exclusive
No.	Title	Length
16.	"La Fuga"	3:28
17.	"Solido"	3:28
Total length:		61:04

Talento de Barrio promotional EP – CD promo
No.	Title	Length
1.	"Solido"
2.	"Fiel Amiga"
3.	"Block Party" (featuring Yaga & Mackie)
4.	"Talento de Barrio" (featuring Randy, Arcángel and De la Ghetto)
5.	"La Fuga"

Mundial edition
No.	Title	Length
1.	"Somos de Calle" (remix) (featuring Arcángel, De la Ghetto, Guelo Star, MC Ceja, Julio Voltio, Ñejo, Chyno Nyno, Cosculluela and Baby Rasta)	6:31
2.	"Pégalo"	2:56
3.	"La Fuga"	3:16
4.	"Quiero Decirte" (featuring Arcángel)	3:42
5.	"No Comprende"	3:30
6.	"Échale Pique"	3:10
7.	"Bailando Fue" (featuring Jowell & Randy)	4:17
8.	"Come y Vete" (bachata version)	2:58
9.	"Fiel Amiga"	3:11
10.	"Sólido"	3:32
11.	"Salgo pa' la Calle" (remix) (featuring Randy and Erre XI)	4:31
12.	"¿Qué Tengo Que Hacer?" (mambo version) (featuring Omega)	5:18
13.	"Los Buenos Tiempos"	3:20
14.	"El Ritmo No Perdona"	3:03
15.	"¿Qué Tengo Que Hacer?" (remix) (featuring Jowell & Randy)	3:22
16.	"Échale Pique" (remix) (featuring Yomo)	3:10
17.	"Mi Testamento (Más Problemas)"	2:45

== Credits and personnel ==
Credits adapted from the CD information, where Daddy Yankee is credited as Raymond Ayala instead of Ramón Ayala, and Los de la Nazza are credited as Los de la Nasa.

"Talento de Barrio"

- Ramón Ayala – vocals and lyrics
- Eliezer García – production and audio engineering
- Eduardo Lopez – production and audio engineering
- Marc Lee – audio mixing

"Pa-Kum-Pa!!"

- Ramón Ayala – vocals and lyrics
- Eduardo Lopez – production and audio engineering
- Eliezer García – audio engineering
- Marc Lee – audio mixing

"Temblor"

- Ramón Ayala – vocals and lyrics
- Eliezer García – production and audio engineering
- Eduardo Lopez – production and audio engineering
- Marc Lee – audio mixing

"Pose"

- Ramón Ayala – vocals and lyrics
- Eliezer García – production, audio mixing and audio engineering
- Eduardo Lopez – production, audio mixing and audio engineering
- José Cotto – audio mixing

"Llamado de Emergencia"

- Ramón Ayala – vocals and lyrics
- Eliezer García – production and audio engineering
- Eduardo Lopez – audio engineering
- Francisco Saldaña – arrangement
- Victor Delgado – arrangement
- Marc Lee – audio mixing

"Oasis de Fantasía"

- Ramón Ayala – vocals and lyrics
- Eliezer García – production and audio engineering
- Eduardo Lopez – production and audio engineering
- Marc Lee – audio mixing

"Salgo pa' la Calle" (featuring Randy)

- Ramón Ayala – vocals and lyrics
- Randy Ortíz – vocals
- Victor Cabrera – production and lyrics
- Francisco Saldaña – production
- Marco Masis – production
- Eliezer García – audio engineering
- Eduardo Lopez – audio engineering
- Marc Lee – audio mixing

"¿Qué Tengo Que Hacer?"

- Ramón Ayala – vocals and lyrics
- Eliezer García – production, audio mixing and audio engineering
- Eduardo Lopez – production, audio mixing and audio engineering
- Marc Lee – audio mixing
- Luis Almonte – audio engineering

"Suelta"

- Ramón Ayala – vocals and lyrics
- Eliezer García – production and audio engineering
- Eduardo Lopez – production and audio engineering
- David Pinto – vocal arrangement
- Marc Lee – audio mixing

"De la Paz y de la Guerra"

- Ramón Ayala – vocals and lyrics
- Eliezer García – production, audio engineering and arrangement
- Eduardo Lopez – audio engineering
- Elvis Crespo – arrangement
- Melvin Garriga – trumpet
- Felipe Díaz – alto saxophone and tenor saxophone
- David Pinto – chorus

"Pasión" (featuring Arcángel)

- Ramón Ayala – vocals and lyrics
- Austin Santos – vocals and lyrics
- Eliezer García – production, audio mixing and audio engineering
- Eduardo Lopez – production, audio mixing and audio engineering
- José Cotto – audio mixing

"Come y Vete"

- Ramón Ayala – vocals and lyrics
- Eliezer García – production, audio mixing and audio engineering
- Eduardo Lopez – production, audio mixing and audio engineering
- Marc Lee – audio mixing

"K-ndela"

- Ramón Ayala – vocals and lyrics
- Eliezer García – production, audio mixing and audio engineering
- Eduardo Lopez – production, audio mixing and audio engineering
- Marc Lee – audio mixing

"Infinito"

- Ramón Ayala – vocals and lyrics
- Eliezer García – production and audio engineering
- Eduardo Lopez – production and audio engineering
- David Pinto – vocal arrangement
- Marc Lee – audio mixing

"Somos de Calle"

- Ramón Ayala – vocals and lyrics
- Paul Irizarri – production and audio mixing
- Armando Rosario – production
- Eliezer García – audio engineering
- Eduardo Lopez – audio engineering

== Charts ==
Album charts

Chart (2008–2009)	Peak position
Argentina Album Chart	5
Mexican Albums (Top 100 Mexico)	28
U.S. Billboard 200	13
U.S. Billboard Top Latin Albums	1
U.S. Billboard Top Soundtracks	3
U.S. Billboard Top Rap Albums	6

Year-end charts

Chart (2008–2009)	Peak position
Argentina Annual Charts	7
U.S. Billboard Top Latin Albums	13
U.S. Billboard Top Latin Rhythm Albums	1

== Sales and certifications ==
Region	Certification	Certified units/sales
Argentina (CAPIF)	Platinum	40,000^{^}
Central America (CFC)	Gold	5,000
Central America (CFC) Digital download	Platinum	250,000
United States (RIAA)	2× Platinum (Latin)	200,000^{^}
^{^} Shipments figures based on certification alone.
