= List of number-one Billboard Top Latin Albums of 2005 =

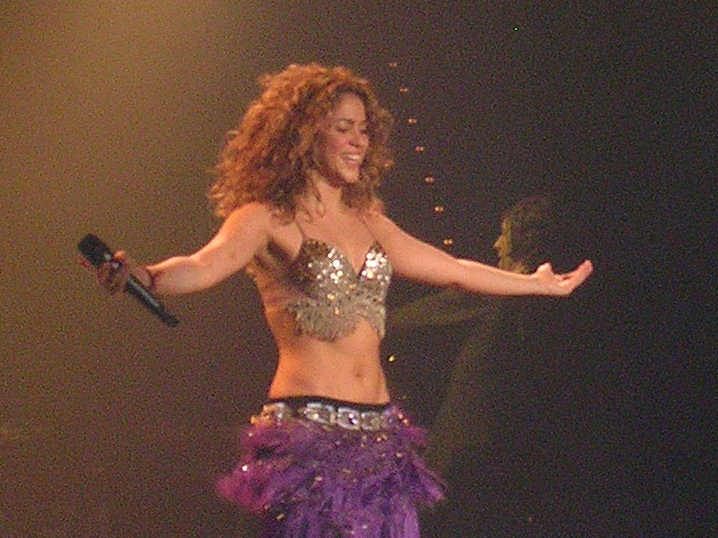
In 2005, Shakira peaked at number one for the fourth time.

The Billboard Top Latin albums chart, published in Billboard magazine, is a record chart that features Latin music sales information. This data are compiled by Nielsen SoundScan from a sample that includes music stores, music departments at electronics and department stores, Internet sales (both physical and digital) and verifiable sales from concert venues in the United States.

There were nine number-one albums in 2005, including Barrio Fino by Daddy Yankee, which peaked at the top of the chart for 25 weeks, sold nearly 900,000 copies in the United States, reached number 26 on Billboard 200, was named Reggaeton Album of the Year at the 2005 Billboard Latin Music Awards, and won a Latin Grammy Award for Best Urban Music Album. Another recording by Daddy Yankee entitled Barrio Fino en Directo was released on December 7, 2005, and reached the first spot on the chart. The album contains live tracks and five new songs, including the Hot Latin Tracks number-one single "Rompe". RBD, Don Omar, K-Paz de la Sierra, Grupo Montéz de Durango and Wisin & Yandel peaked at number one for the first time in their careers. Cautivo, the 12th studio album by Puerto Rican performer Chayanne became his third number-one set on this list.

Fijación Oral Vol. 1 by Colombian singer-songwriter Shakira spent 17 weeks at number one on the chart. Despite a ban by retail chain Ritmo Latino, the album had the largest sales week for a Spanish-language album since Nielsen SoundScan began tracking in 1991, with 157,000 copies sold, which led to a first-ever debut by a Latin album at number four on Billboard 200, surpassing Ricky Martin's Almas del Silencio, which was the previous record holder with 65,000 units in 2003. This album won five Latin Grammy Awards, including Album of the Year, and also received the Grammy Award for Best Latin Rock/Alternative Album.

== Albums ==
Chart date	Album	Artist	Reference
January 1	Barrio Fino (The Fine Neighborhood)	Daddy Yankee	
January 8	Barrio Fino (The Fine Neighborhood)	Daddy Yankee	
January 15	Barrio Fino (The Fine Neighborhood)	Daddy Yankee	
January 22	Barrio Fino (The Fine Neighborhood)	Daddy Yankee	
January 29	Barrio Fino (The Fine Neighborhood)	Daddy Yankee	
February 5	Barrio Fino (The Fine Neighborhood)	Daddy Yankee	
February 12	Barrio Fino (The Fine Neighborhood)	Daddy Yankee	
February 19	Y Sigue La Mata Dando (And We Are Still Doing It)	Grupo Montéz de Durango	
February 26	Y Sigue La Mata Dando (And We Are Still Doing It)	Grupo Montéz de Durango	
March 5	Barrio Fino	Daddy Yankee	
March 12	Barrio Fino	Daddy Yankee	
March 19	Barrio Fino	Daddy Yankee	
March 26	Barrio Fino	Daddy Yankee	
April 2	Barrio Fino	Daddy Yankee	
April 9	Barrio Fino	Daddy Yankee	
April 16	Barrio Fino	Daddy Yankee	
April 23	Barrio Fino	Daddy Yankee	
April 30	Barrio Fino	Daddy Yankee	
May 7	Barrio Fino	Daddy Yankee	
May 14	Barrio Fino	Daddy Yankee	
May 21	Barrio Fino	Daddy Yankee	
May 28	Barrio Fino	Daddy Yankee	
June 4	Barrio Fino	Daddy Yankee	
June 11	Barrio Fino	Daddy Yankee	
June 18	Barrio Fino	Daddy Yankee	
June 25	Fijación Oral Vol. 1 (Oral Fixation, Vol. 1)	Shakira	
July 2	Fijación Oral Vol. 1 (Oral Fixation, Vol. 1)	Shakira	
July 9	Fijación Oral Vol. 1 (Oral Fixation, Vol. 1)	Shakira	
July 16	Fijación Oral Vol. 1 (Oral Fixation, Vol. 1)	Shakira	
July 23	Fijación Oral Vol. 1 (Oral Fixation, Vol. 1)	Shakira	
July 30	Fijación Oral Vol. 1 (Oral Fixation, Vol. 1)	Shakira	
August 6	Fijación Oral Vol. 1 (Oral Fixation, Vol. 1)	Shakira	
August 13	Fijación Oral Vol. 1 (Oral Fixation, Vol. 1)	Shakira	
August 20	Fijación Oral Vol. 1 (Oral Fixation, Vol. 1)	Shakira	
August 27	Fijación Oral Vol. 1 (Oral Fixation, Vol. 1)	Shakira	
September 3	Fijación Oral Vol. 1 (Oral Fixation, Vol. 1)	Shakira	
September 10	Fijación Oral Vol. 1 (Oral Fixation, Vol. 1)	Shakira	
September 17	Fijación Oral Vol. 1 (Oral Fixation, Vol. 1)	Shakira	
September 24	Fijación Oral Vol. 1 (Oral Fixation, Vol. 1)	Shakira	
October 1	Fijación Oral Vol. 1 (Oral Fixation, Vol. 1)	Shakira	
October 8	Fijación Oral Vol. 1 (Oral Fixation, Vol. 1)	Shakira	
October 15	Cautivo (Captive)	Chayanne	
October 22	Más Capaces que Nunca (More Capable Than Ever)	K-Paz de la Sierra	
October 29	Fijación Oral Vol. 1	Shakira	
November 5	Nuestro Amor (Our Love)	RBD	
November 12	Nuestro Amor (Our Love)	RBD	
November 19	Nuestro Amor (Our Love)	RBD	
November 26	Pa'l Mundo (For The World)	Wisin & Yandel	
December 3	Pa'l Mundo (For The World)	Wisin & Yandel	
December 10	Pa'l Mundo (For The World)	Wisin & Yandel	
December 17	Pa'l Mundo (For The World)	Wisin & Yandel	
December 24	Da Hitman Presents Reggaetón Latino	Don Omar	
December 31	Barrio Fino en Directo (The Fine Neighborhood Live)	Daddy Yankee	
