= PhaseOne =

Australian DJ, producer, and record label executive

Background information
- Born: Graeme Duffy; 22 December 1989 (age 36)
- Origin: Sydney, New South Wales, Australia
- Genres: Bass music; Drum and bass; Dubstep; Electro house; Glitch hop; Metalstep; Briddim; Rock music; Metal music
- Instrument: Digital Audio Workstation (DAW)
- Years active: 2013–present
- Labels: Disciple; Drop Dem; Epitaph; Firepower; Kannibalen; Never Say Die; Play Me; Sounds of Mayhem; Subsidia; Welcome
- Website: www.phaseoneau.com

Graeme Duffy (born 22 December 1989) (Note: https://www.instagram.com/p/DSk7zdkExJ_/) bka PhaseOne is an Australian DJ, electronic music producer and record label executive. PhaseOne is well known for producing and releasing Metalstep music record: A subgenre within dubstep that combines Rock music & Heavy metal music with Bass music and other genres in Electronic music. PhaseOne also founded a record label called Sounds of Mayhem Recordings.

== Early life ==
Duffy grew up in Sydney, New South Wales, Australia. Prior to PhaseOne, Duffy used to be a member in several rock/metal bands, and its music is one of his main influences for every track he produces.

== Career ==
=== Releases on Firepower Records (2014–2016) ===
In November 2014, PhaseOne released his first Extended play (EP) titled "Touching The Stars" on Datsik's Firepower Records. "Six Feet Under" was remarked as being an combination between dubstep and drum and bass and Heavy metal music. The buildup on the track, in particular, was remarked as being beautiful due to its "metal power chords and double bass pedals". "Burdens" and "Initiate" also contained influences from Glitch hop (the former being purely glitch hop) whereas "Touching The Stars" was a purely Drum and bass track. One month later, PhaseOne also won a remix competition hosted Disciple Recordings where he remixed Virtual Riot's single: "We're Not Alone".

In March 2015, PhaseOne released a single in collaboration with British electronic music duo Bar9 called "Why They Need Us". The single was remarked for having an "epic intro, the lightning switches between 4/4 [beats] and halfstep, [and] those thundering drum rolls". The build up included a speech from Adam Sutler: One of the main antagonists in the 2005 film: V for Vendetta.

Four months later, PhaseOne released another single called "UFO". The track was remarked for being "grimy, intense and original" overall, its "vocal sampling bring[ing] an undeniable errie vibe, and a tension filled [buildup giving] way to a drop that is absolutely unexpected in all the best ways".

=== Releases on Disciple Records (2016–2021) ===
In January 2017, PhaseOne signed with Disciple which meant that his tracks will exclusively be released on the label for a certain period of time. His first release was his third 4-track EP titled "Origins". The EP was remarked of having the "gnarliest, most unique fusions with swarthy drum rolls, chugging guitars, deep belly roars and a whole range of wider influences." The etymology behind the EP referred to his roots in metal music and rock music.

Five months later, PhaseOne released his fourth EP titled "Dreamscape". "They Came From Within" included a sample, in the song's buildup, from the 1975 film: Shivers. The song was remarked as an equal combination from both PhaseOne's metal influences and Figure's extensive music production skills.

In May 2018, PhaseOne released his fifth EP titled "Double Up".

In May 2019, PhaseOne released his first studio album titled "Transcendency". It was remarked for its willingness to "transcend genres and bleed into other worlds" that "even hardcore purists within metal, Hip-hop, drum & bass, and beyond" can embrace.

In 2020, PhaseOne collaborated with Hydraulix to release a single called "Space Invaders". The track was remarked for its "glitched-out intro" and a "sharp bass cut[ting] the tension" between the build-up and the drop, as well as the drop that "contradicts the harshness of the basses". The track was based on the video game Space Invaders.

=== Post-Disciple releases & Sounds of Mayhem Recordings (2022–present) ===
In July 2022, PhaseOne collaborated with Australian rock band Polaris to release "Icarus" on Epitaph Records. The track was remarked for its "explosive composition that combines electronic basslines and metal instrumentation". PhaseOne initially wrote the song to be a metal music track, but then added electronic elements later on. Polaris' lyrics touches of "humanity's seemingly endless ambition and self-interest, and [its] failure to recognize or learn from the destructive ramifications of that tendency".

On June 13, 2023, PhaseOne founded a record label called "Sounds of Mayhem Recordings". The label was founded as a way to showcase unreleased music that PhaseOne and his associates produced, and to be "live in the nextus between metal and bass music". The etymology behind the name was inspired partially due to the success of his 2017 song on his "Origins" EP titled "Welcome To Mayhem". In December, PhaseOne collaborated with Nosphere to release "Brunt" which "features intense metal breakdowns with unique guitar riffs".

== Discography ==
=== Albums ===
Title	Tracklist	Details
Transcendency	1. Transcendency - Intro; 2. Mayday (with Modestep); 3. Break Em; 4. We Are The Free (feat. Thy Art Is Murder); 5. Ultima (feat. Bone Thugs-n-Harmony); 6. Crash & Burn (ft. Northlane); 7. Insanity; 8. Cadence - Interlude; 9. Digital (ft. Periphery); 10. Demon Hunter (with Subtronics); 11. Lost (ft. Koven); 12. Headstone; 13. Aurora - Outro	Released: 17 April 2019; Label: Disciple Records; Format: Digital download
Terranova	1. Terranova; 2. SOS (feat. Make Them Suffer); 3. Pulse (feat. Banks Arcade); 4. Reset (with Flowidus & Dread MC); 5. Beyond; 6. Divide (feat. Micah Martin & Intervals); 7. Ruins; 8. Lullaby (with Hvdes); 9. Redsky (feat. Future Static); 10. Shadows (with Scro)	Released: 30 May 2025; Label: Sounds of Mayhem Recordings; Format: Digital download

=== Extended Plays (EPs) ===
Title	Tracklist	Details
Touching The Stars	1. Initiate; 2. Touching The Stars; 3. Six Feet Under; 4. Burdens (feat. Aloma Steele)	Released: 11 November 2014; Label: Firepower Records; Format: Digital download
Matter Of Time	1. Extinction; 2. Nangs; 3. Matter Of Time; 4. Take My Desire	Released: 30 October 2015; Label: Firepower Records; Format: Digital download
Origins	1. Origins; 2. Welcome to Mayhem (feat. In Hearts Wake); 3. Kung Fu (feat. Virtual Riot); 4. Broken Chains	Released: 16 January 2017; Label: Disciple Records; Format: Digital download
Dreamscape	1. Dreamscape (feat. Crystal Lake); 2. They Came From Within (with Figure); 3. Circle Pit (feat. Virus Syndicate); 4. Revive (with Oolacile)	Released: 16 June 2017; Label: Disciple Records; Format: Digital download
Double Up	1. Double Up (feat. Young Buck); 2. State Of Emergency (with Yookie); 3. Decimate; 4. Welcome To Mayhem (VIP Mix) (feat. In Hearts Wake)	Released: 11 May 2018; Label: Disciple Records; Format: Digital download
Dead Line	1. Inevitable Outcome; 2. Dead Line; 3. Hanging By A Thread (feat. Micah Martin); 4. Another Breath	Released: 21 August 2020; Label: Disciple Records; Format: Digital download
The Risen	1. The Risen (with Sleep Waker); 2. Drop Bears (with HelaSex); 3. Raindrops (feat. Escape the Fate); 4. Subterrestrial (with Jiqui); 5. Into The Light	Released: 15 October 2021; Label: Disciple Records; Format: Digital download
PhaseOne x UNFD	1. Icarus (with Polaris); 2. World Unknown (with Erra); 3. Eyes Wide Shut (with Void of Vision); 4. Gangrene (with RedHook)	Released: 5 May 2023; Label: Epitaph Records; Format: Digital download
Beyond Oblivion	1. Reign Of Malice (feat. Qoiet); 2. Disrespect (with Hydraulix); 3. Run For Your Life (with Muerte)	Released: 11 August 2023; Label: Sounds Of Mayhem Recordings; Format: Digital download

=== Singles ===
Year	Title	Album	Label
2013	Take Me Away feat. Nicole Millar	Non-album release	Drop Dem Records
2015	Hit Rewind with Hydraulix	Non-album release	Play Me Too Records
2015	Why They Need Us with Bar9	Non-album release	Firepower Records
2015	Recon with Protohype	Shellshock Legends	Firepower Records
2016	UFO	Non-album release	Firepower Records
2016	No Chill with Megalodon	My Selecta EP	Never Say Die Records
2016	Area 51 feat. F3tch	Non-album release	Firepower Records
2017	Send It with 12th Planet & Barely Alive	Non-album release	Disciple Round Table
2018	Mistakes (feat. The Arcturians) with Dodge & Fuski	Non-album release	Disciple Records
2018	Slaughter Them All with 12th Planet	Disciple Alliance Vol. 4	Disciple Records
2018	Taco Bout It with 12th Planet	Non-album release	Disciple Round Table
2019	Bubzstep with 12th Planet & Barely Alive	Non-album release	Disciple Round Table
2019	The Last Stand with Dirtyphonics	Scars EP	Disciple Records
2019	Arsonist (feat. Virus Syndicate) with Barely Alive	Multiplayer EP	Disciple Records
2019	Turtle Neck with Eliminate	Disciple Alliance Vol. 5	Disciple Records
2020	Space Invaders with Hydraulix	Non-album release	Disciple Records
2020	Demise with Excision	Non-album release	Subsidia Records
2020	Make It Bump	Disciple Alliance Vol. 6	Disciple Records
2020	Death Waltz with Kai Wachi	Non-album release	Kannibalen Recods
2021	Enemy with Shane Told	Non-album release	Disciple Records
2021	Enemy (VIP Mix) with Shane Told	Disciple Alliance Vol. 7	Disciple Records
2022	Meet You In The Sound (feat. Aaron Pauley) with Kayzo	Non-album release	Welcome Records
2023	Bringer Of Death feat. In Hearts Wake	Sounds of Mayhem: The Uprising I	Sounds of Mayhem Recordings
2023	Brunt with Nosphere	Sounds of Mayhem: The Uprising II	Sounds of Mayhem Recordings
2024	Brace For Impact	Non-album release	Sounds of Mayhem Recordings
2025	Divide (Acoustic) (feat. Micah Martin & Intervals)	Non-album release	Sounds of Mayhem Recordings

=== Remixes ===
Year	Original Artist	Title	Label
2014	Apashe	Black Gold (with Hydraulix)	Kannibalen Records
2014	Virtual Riot	We're Not Alone	Disciple Records
2017	The Trickaz	OG Purp	Disquette Prod
2018	Delta Heavy & Dirty Audio	Stay	Monstercat
2018	AFK & Carbin feat. Cody Ray	Boss	Bite This!
2019	Zomboy	The Beast	Never Say Die Records
2020	In Hearts Wake	Worldwide Suicide	Epitaph Records
2022	The Upbeats (feat. Joe Dukie)	Beams	Vision Recordings
2023	Dabin & Kai Wachi feat. Lø Spirit	Hollow	Kannibalen Records
2024	RedHook	Jabberwocky	RedHook Records
2025	Fox Lake	Freestyle	Sounds Of Mayhem
2026	Sunborn (FR)	Infinity Pool	Solid State Records
