= Barrio Fino en Directo =

Live album by Daddy Yankee
- Released: December 13, 2005
- Recorded: 2004–2005
- Genres: Reggaeton; dancehall
- Length: 53:12
- Labels: Interscope; El Cartel
- Producers: Luny Tunes; Monserrate & DJ Urba; Sam "Fish" Fisher; Fido; Eliel; Echo; Diesel; Nely; Naldo

Daddy Yankee chronology
Ahora le Toca al Cangri! Live (2004)	Barrio Fino en Directo (2005)	El Cartel: The Big Boss (2007)

Singles from Barrio Fino en Directo
- 1. "Rompe" Released: September 30, 2005; 2. "Gangsta Zone" Released: October 17, 2005; 3. "Machucando" Released: January 2, 2006; 4. "El Truco" Released: May 1, 2006

Barrio Fino en Directo is the second live album by Puerto Rican rapper Daddy Yankee, released on December 13, 2005, by El Cartel Records and distributed by Interscope Records. The album is a live collection of songs from Daddy Yankee's previous album Barrio Fino recorded during his tour Barrio Fino World Tour at several locations including the United States, Dominican Republic and Puerto Rico. It was the first Daddy Yankee album to have a Parental Advisory sticker and first and only album to include a skit. It also includes a DVD featuring interviews, concerts and the making of the music videos. A re-release of the album, Tormenta Tropical, Vol. 1, was released on July 4, 2006. It includes all of the new recorded songs, and two of the live tracks from the album. The album differs from Barrio Fino en Directo because it does not include a DVD.

The album includes 16 tracks, of which five were new songs, and features guest appearances by Snoop Dogg and Paul Wall. It was supported by the release of four singles: "Gangsta Zone", "Machucando", "El Truco" and the lead single "Rompe", that peaked at the top of US Hot Latin Songs for 13 consecutive weeks and reached number 24 on the US Hot 100. Barrio Fino en Directo received mixed to positive reviews. It won several awards including the Lo Nuestro Award for Urban Album of the Year and Reggaeton Album of the Year at the 2006 Latin Billboard Music Awards. Also, it was nominated for Best Urban Music Album at the 7th Annual Latin Grammy Awards.

Barrio Fino en Directo was a commercial success. It debuted at number one on the Billboard Top Latin Albums and remained the top-selling album on the chart for 14 consecutive weeks. It was the top-selling Latin album of 2006 in the United States, following Barrio Fino in 2005 and was certified Gold by RIAA. Eventually, it was named the 13th best selling Latin album of the last 25 years in the United States. It reached the top 10 of the Mexican and Peruvian album charts and charted in Japan. Also, it was certified platinum in Mexico and gold in Japan and Colombia. To promote the new tracks of the album, Yankee expanded his Barrio Fino World Tour on a third and last leg.

== Background ==
In 2004, following the success of "Gasolina" and his third studio album Barrio Fino, Yankee embarked at the Barrio Fino World Tour to promote the album. In December 2004, Yankee performed at the Coliseo de Puerto Rico, becoming the first urban act to do so. As of July 2005, Barrio Fino had sold over 1.5 million copies worldwide. On July 27, 2005 it was revealed to the press the dates of Yankee US leg of the tour under the name Who's Your Daddy Tour including a presentation co-headlined with Carlos Vives at Madison Square Garden in New York City. Also, at the same press conference, he explained his intentions to release a DVD recorded during his concert in Puerto Rico the past year titled Barrio Fino en Directo. Other sources stated that the live album and the DVD were going to include footage of the tour along with new recorded songs, and was set to be released late that year along with the movie Talento de Barrio, and with his clothing line and shoe line with the partnership of Reebok.

On August 30, 2005, Yankee signed a distribution contract with Interescope Records. On the press note, he stated his intentions to release his new album El Cartel in November of the same year and Barrio Fino Directo in early 2006. On October 16, 2005, Daddy Yankee performed as the last act at the closure day of the Festival Presidente in Santo Domingo, Dominican Republic in front of 50,000 fans. It was the first urban act to perform at the festival. The album was set to be released in September 2005, however it was pushed back for unknown reasons. The first single, "Rompe", was released on September 30, 2005. In late November 2005, MTV announced that the release date was December 13, 2005, and the album was going to include five new tracks produced by Urba y Monserrate and Luny Tunes.

== Critical reception ==
Professional ratings
Review scores
Source	Rating
AllMusic	3.5/5 stars
The Ottawa Citizen	3/5 stars
PopMatters	5/10 stars
Rolling Stone	3/5 stars

Barrio Fino en Directo received mixed to positive reviews. Jason Birchmeier from AllMusic gave it a score of 3.5 out of 5, and stated "The new studio recordings are all promising, raising the level of anticipation for Daddy's next studio album to a ridiculous level". On the same hand, Eric Cohen from The Ottawa Citizen In a three-star review, Eric Cohen of Blender praised Barrio Fino En Directo for its energetic live atmosphere and noted that Daddy Yankee’s command of the crowd translated effectively on record. However, he also felt that listening to the album from start to finish could become repetitive, suggesting that the accompanying DVD offered a more compelling experience.

== Commercial reception ==
In the United States, the first week predictions were between 50,000 and 60,000. Barrio Fino en Directo debuted at number 24 on the Billboard 200 in the last week of 2005 with over 100,000 copies sold. It spent 13 weeks at the top of the US Billboard Top Latin Albums chart and was the best-selling Latin album of 2006 in the US with 484,000 copies sold. The album was also certified Gold by the RIAA for 500,000 copies sold. It is the 13th best-selling Latin album in the US according to Nielsen SoundScan and Billboard with 809,000 copies sold.

By the end of 2006, Daddy Yankee was recognized as the top-selling Latin artist in the United States. The album is credited with contributing to the continued commercial expansion of reggaeton within the Latin music industry. That same year, four reggaeton albums ranked among the top five best-selling Latin albums. The release achieved significant commercial success in Latin America, reaching number nine on the Mexican Albums Chart and receiving a Platinum certification for sales of 100,000 copies in Mexico. It also entered retail charts in Peru and Japan. Barrio Fino en Directo was named the third best-charting album of the 2000s on the US Top Latin Albums chart.

== Track listing ==
No.	Title	Producer(s)	Length
1.	"En Directo"	Echo	1:36
2.	"King Daddy (Live)"	Luny Tunes	2:35
3.	"Dale Caliente (Live)"	Fido; Monserrate & DJ Urba	3:17
4.	"El Empuje (Live)"	Monserrate & DJ Urba	3:28
5.	"Tu Príncipe (Live)" (featuring Zion & Lennox)	Luny Tunes	3:35
6.	"Santifica Tus Escapularios (Live)"	Luny Tunes	3:25
7.	"Corazones (Live)"	Echo; Diesel	1:37
8.	"No Me Dejes Solo (Live)"	Fido; Monserrate & DJ Urba	1:37
9.	"Lo Que Pasó, Pasó (Live)"	Luny Tunes; Eliel	3:37
10.	"Gasolina (Live)"	Luny Tunes	5:06
11.	"Rompe"	Sam "Fish" Fisher; Monserrate & DJ Urba	3:08
12.	"Machucando"	Luny Tunes	2:58
13.	"Gangsta Zone" (featuring Snoop Dogg)	Nely; Naldo	3:33
14.	"Machete Reloaded" (featuring Paul Wall)	Monserrate & DJ Urba	3:27
15.	"Como Dice Que Dijo" (Skit)	Sam "Fish" Fisher	0:41
16.	"El Truco"	DJ Urba; Sam "Fish" Fisher	3:39
Total length:			53:12

iTunes Bonus Tracks
No.	Title	Producer(s)	Length
17.	"El Caldo"	Luny Tunes	3:39
18.	"Gangsta Zone (Official Remix)" (featuring Arcángel, De La Ghetto, Héctor el Father, Yomo and Angel Doze)	Nely; Naldo	6:53
19.	"Rompe (Official Remix)" (featuring Lloyd Banks and Young Buck))	Monserrate & DJ Urba, Sam "Fish" Fisher	3:27
20.	"Rompe (Official Remix)" (featuring Lloyd Banks, Young Buck and Nelly Furtado)	Monserrate & DJ Urba, Sam "Fish" Fisher	3:27
Total length:			1:10:38

=== Tormenta Tropical ===
This was an alternative version with mostly studio songs.

Tormenta Tropical, Vol. 1
No.	Title	Writer(s)	Producer(s)	Length
1.	"Rompe"		Sam "Fish" Fisher; Monserrate & DJ Urba	3:08
2.	"Gangsta Zone" (featuring Snoop Dogg)		Nely; Naldo	3:33
3.	"Machucando"		Luny Tunes	2:58
4.	"Gasolina"		Luny Tunes	3:12
5.	"Lo Que Pasó, Pasó"	Ayala; Joan Ortiz	Luny Tunes; Eliel	3:30
6.	"Machete (Remix)" (featuring Paul Wall)		Monserrate & DJ Urba	3:25
7.	"El Truco"		DJ Urba; Sam "Fish" Fisher	3:39
8.	"Rompe (International Remix)" (featuring Lloyd Banks, Young Buck and Nelly Furtado)		Monserrate & DJ Urba, Sam "Fish" Fisher	3:27
9.	"King Daddy (Live In San Juan, Puerto Rico)"		Luny Tunes	2:35
10.	"Gasolina (Live In San Juan, Puerto Rico)"		Luny Tunes	7:39

Videos
No.	Title	Length
1.	"King Daddy (Live Video)"
2.	"Gasolina (Live Video)"
3.	"Rompe (Latin Version) (Music Video)"
4.	"Gangsta Zone (Music Video)" (featuring Snoop Dogg)

== Charts ==
=== Weekly charts ===
Chart (2005–2006)	Peak position
Japanese Albums (Oricon)	167
Mexican Albums (AMPROFON)	9
Peruvian Albums (Phantom)	5
US Billboard 200	24
US Top Latin Albums (Billboard)	1
US Latin Rhythm Albums (Billboard)	1
US Top Rap Albums (Billboard)	6

Chart (2007)	Peak position
US Top Latin Albums (Billboard)	31

Chart (2017)	Peak position
US Top Latin Albums (Billboard)	45

=== Year-end charts ===
Chart (2006)	Position
US Billboard 200	83
US Top Latin Albums (Billboard)	1
Chart (2007)	Position
US Top Latin Albums (Billboard)	62

== Certifications ==
Region	Certification	Certified units/sales
Mexico (AMPROFON)	Platinum	100,000^{^}
United States (RIAA)	Gold	809,000
^{^} Shipments figures based on certification alone.

== See also ==
- 2005 in Latin music
- List of best-selling Latin albums in the United States
- List of number-one Billboard Latin Rhythm Albums of 2005
- List of number-one Billboard Latin Rhythm Albums of 2006
