= Barrio Fino =

Studio album by Daddy Yankee
- Released: July 13, 2004
- Recorded: 2002–2004
- Studios: El Cartel Studios (San Juan, Puerto Rico); Mas Flow Studios (Carolina, Puerto Rico)
- Genres: Reggaeton; hip-hop; tropical; R&B
- Length: 66:24
- Languages: Spanish; English
- Labels: VI; El Cartel
- Producers: Daddy Yankee (exec.); Crooked Stilo; Diesel; DJ Nelson; Echo; Eliel; Fido; Luny Tunes; Monserrate & DJ Urba; Naldo; Nely; Ramsis

Daddy Yankee chronology
Los Homerun-es (2003)	Barrio Fino (2004)	Ahora le Toca al Cangri! Live (2005)

Singles from Barrio Fino
- 1. "Gasolina" Released: April 26, 2004; 2. "Lo Que Pasó, Pasó" Released: August 2, 2004; 3. "No Me Dejes Solo" Released: January 3, 2005; 4. "Like You" Released: April 25, 2005; 5. "Tu Príncipe" Released: June 13, 2005

Barrio Fino (Spanish pronunciation: [ˈbarjo ˈfino]; English: "Fine 'Hood") is the third studio album by Puerto Rican rapper Daddy Yankee, released on July 13, 2004, in the United States by VI Music and El Cartel Records and internationally by Machete Music and Polydor Records. Released two years after his previous studio album, El Cangri.com (2002), the album was recorded in Puerto Rico between 2003 and 2004. It explores themes ranging from dance, sex, romance, introspection, and protest against political corruption and violence against women. Barrio Fino was instrumental in popularizing reggaeton in the mainstream market, enhancing Daddy Yankee's career, as well as cementing his status as one of the most successful Latin artists of the 2000s. The album is reported to have sold over 8 million copies in the world.

Daddy Yankee wrote all the tracks, with co-writing credits on seven, and is credited as executive producer. Five of the 21 songs were released as singles. The first single, "Gasolina", charted within the top 10 in Denmark, Italy, Norway, Ireland, Switzerland, the United Kingdom, Germany, and Austria, while "Lo Que Pasó, Pasó" peaked at number two on the US Hot Latin Songs chart. Barrio Fino reached number one on the US Tropical Albums and the Top Latin Albums charts. It became the first reggaeton recording to debut and peak atop the latter chart. It ranked within the top 30 in the United States, Portugal, Switzerland and Spain.

The album was Daddy Yankee's first international commercial success, and garnered a Latin Grammy Award for Best Urban Music Album, while "Gasolina" became the first reggaeton song to receive a nomination for a Latin Grammy Award for Record of the Year. Barrio Fino produced two Billboard Hot 100 entries, but despite the album's success, none of its four Billboard Hot Latin Songs entries reached number one. Barrio Fino was ranked number 44 in the "Top 50 Records of 2005" list by Rolling Stone and was included in Billboard's "50 Greatest Latin Albums of the Past 50 Years" in 2015. The album received a platinum certification by the Recording Industry Association of America, denoting shipments of over one million copies in the United States, where it became the top-selling Latin album of 2005 and the 2000s decade and is the seventh best-selling Latin album of all time in the country. In 2020, Rolling Stone updated their 500 Greatest Albums of All Time list placing Barrio Fino at number 473.

Daddy Yankee appeared at the Billboard Latin Music Awards performing the "Gasolina" with a guest appearance from Sean Combs in 2005; it was recognized by Billboard as one of the best performances of the night.

== Background ==
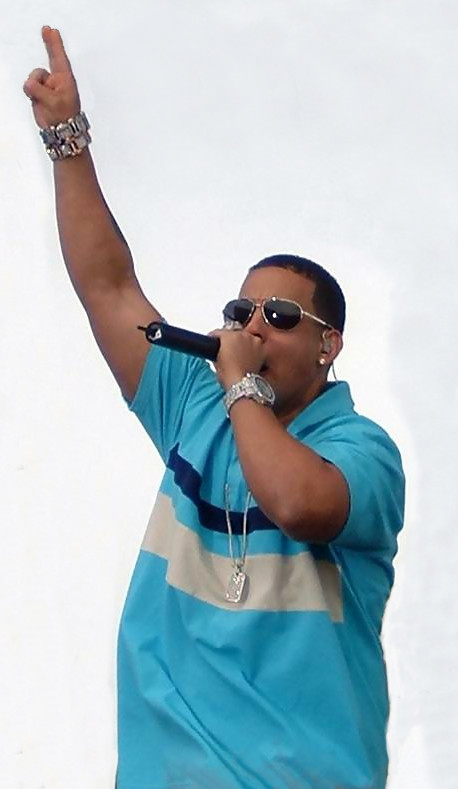
Daddy Yankee in 2006.

In 1991, Ramón Ayala (known professionally as Daddy Yankee) began his musical career on a collaborative project with Puerto Rican disc jockey and producer DJ Playero. Daddy Yankee was later featured on Playero's 37 and 38 studio albums, before releasing his first solo record titled No Mercy in 1995. At the age of 17, while taking a break from a recording session, Ayala was shot in the leg after being caught inadvertently in the middle of a shootout, ending his aspirations of becoming a professional baseball player. Following his injuries, Daddy Yankee continued working on underground reggaeton records, and released his first album as a producer, El Cartel de Yankee (1997). After the release of his 2001 independent album El Cartel II: Los Cangris, Daddy Yankee released his second studio album El Cangri.com (2002), which is cited as the record that made him well known outside his natal Puerto Rico. Prior to Barrio Fino, Daddy Yankee released a compilation album titled Los Homerun-es, which became his first record to chart within the top 10 on the US Top Latin Albums, reaching number seven. Later that year, he was featured on Dominican duo Luny Tunes' debut studio album, Mas Flow, on the track "Cógela Que Van Sin Jockey", whose outro included Daddy Yankee promoting Barrio Fino. At first, the album was supposed to be titled El Cangri.com 2: Barrio Fino with an August 2003 release; however, those plans were scrapped. By 2004, Yankee caught on and established a steady career on his home island. His previous four albums had each sold more than 100,000 copies in Puerto Rico.

== Composition ==
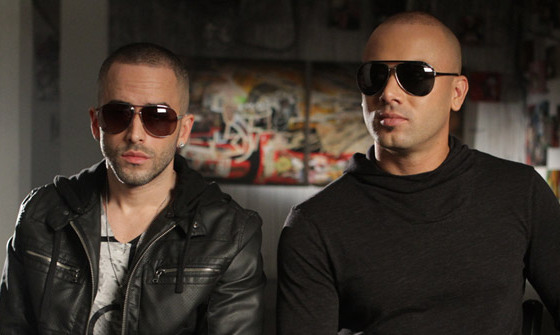
Puerto Rican duo Wisin & Yandel (pictured) provided vocals for the track "No Me Dejes Solo". Daddy Yankee credited their collaboration on Barrio Fino as the boost they needed to advance their career.

The album's lyrics explore themes ranging from dance, sex, romance, introspection, and social issues, which are recurring themes in the rapper's repertoire. The intro, performed by ex-convict poet Gavilán, is a poetic piece focusing on the humble side of Puerto Rico's poor neighborhoods or barrios. On the next track, "King Daddy", the rapper describes his career and predicts how Barrio Fino will revolutionize reggaeton music and validate his stage name as a successful Latin artist in the United States. "Dale Caliente" is a reggaeton dance song inspired by dancehall and Jamaican music, featuring backing vocals by Puerto Rican singer Glory and Jamaican artist Blacka-Nice. "No Me Dejes Solo" features lead vocals by Puerto Rican duo Wisin & Yandel and backing vocals by Glory. Its sexually suggestive lyrics are about the fears of losing a girlfriend.

"Gasolina", the album's lead single, was inspired by a Puerto Rican phrase about having a good time partying. Before the release of Barrio Fino, Daddy Yankee shared an apartment with his wife and three children in the Villa Kennedy housing project, where he occasionally heard people in the streets shouting "¡Cómo le gusta la gasolina!" ("How she likes gasoline!") at women who accepted rides from men with fancy cars. The hook "a mí me gusta la gasolina, dame más gasolina" ("I like gasoline, give me more gasoline") was born after he chanted rhythmically what he was hearing outside. He contacted his colleague and friend Eddie Dee to work with him on the song's lyrics.

"Gasolina"
Excerpt of the album's lead single and one of Daddy Yankee's signature songs, "Gasolina". The track was composed by using "rapid-fire verses, a thumping and aggressive beat, and the sound of gunning motors." Billboard cited it as "the track that internationalized reggaeton."

"Lo Que Pasó, Pasó"
"Lo Que Pasó, Pasó", a top five hit single on the US Latin chart. The song mixed reggaeton and merengue with lyrics about a breakup. It is one of the many tracks on the album to "fuse street reggaeton with other tropical rhythms."

"Like You"
Daddy Yankee's first Spanglish song, "Like You", written by him for "people who liked reggaeton but did not speak Spanish." The track is a fusion between reggaeton and R&B music, and reached number 78 in the US.

"Like You" is Daddy Yankee's first Spanglish song. Musically, it is a fusion of reggaeton and rhythm and blues, featuring backing vocals by May-Be and Raymond Acosta and guitars by Puerto Rican producer Arnaldo "Naldo" Santos. Daddy Yankee decided to write a song with English-language lyrics, so he "could be understood by people who liked reggaeton but did not speak Spanish." "Lo Que Pasó, Pasó", the album's second single, fuses reggaeton and merengue music, giving it "a Caribbean tropical sound", with lyrics about a man who breaks up with a girl he was seeing after finding out she has a boyfriend. "Tu Príncipe" is a romantic track that features Puerto Rican duo Zion & Lennox, with lyrics describing the dilemmas of falling in love with a best friend and the fears following a revelation of one's feelings. "Cuéntame" is another romantic reggaeton song recorded in order to "balance the production" by creating a similar track to "Tu Príncipe".

"Santifica tus Escapularios" is a rap recording that allowed Daddy Yankee to "vent against all spiritual evil." "Sabor a Melao" fuses reggaeton and salsa music and features Puerto Rican singer-songwriter Andy Montañez, using a chorus from his Batacumbele orchestra. "El Muro" and "El Empuje" are "classic hardcore reggaeton" tracks that were recorded in order to balance the variety of the recording's offerings. The reggaeton and R&B-blended track, "¿Qué Vas a Hacer?", features vocals from May-Be and guitars by Jeorge Salgado and focuses on violence against women. The song was written as a conversation between a man and a woman. "Salud y Vida" is a hip-hop track with Mexican banda influences with lyrics that suggest that people value materialistic objects more than their own well-being. Latin music journalist Ramiro Burr wrote that on this track, Daddy Yankee reflected on his neighborhood questioning "society's endless pursuit of material things." The song features backing vocals by American artist Norman "Notch" Howell and Marcelo Castro performing trumpet.

The interlude, performed by Gavilán, is another poem about the roughness of the barrio, serving as a prelude to the next track. "Corazones" is a socially conscious rap song that "describes how every heart in the world is different and feels different things. So intentions, emotions and even the most similar of situations are always unique to each individual." Daddy Yankee wrote the lyrics because he believes that the mass media focuses more on reporting negative news rather than positive ones. He also took notice about the needs of poor people and barrios. The track mentions politics, crime, hope and Christian spirituality. "Golpe de Estado" is a personal song featuring novice rapper Tommy Viera whose lyrics are about Daddy Yankee's, and Barrio Fino's role in the reggaeton music movement. "Dos Mujeres", performed humorously, takes the point of view of a man who secretly maintains a relationship with two women. "Saber Su Nombre" fuses reggaeton and dancehall music, and tells the story of a man who shows interest in a woman he met at a nightclub. The album's outro, titled "Historia", was written to represent the people of Puerto Rican neighborhoods. Daddy Yankee stated that he wanted to "bring them to life in a story that's very humble but full of pride."

== Production and packaging ==
Luny Tunes produced nine of the 21 tracks on Barrio Fino, including the singles "Gasolina", "Like You", and "Lo Que Pasó, Pasó". Puerto Rican production duo Monserrate & DJ Urba produced three songs, including the single "No Me Dejes Solo". Puerto Rican singer and producer Fido, one half of Alexis & Fido, and Puerto Rican pianist Eliel each produced two tracks. Puerto Rican producers Naldo, DJ Nelson, Echo, Diesel, Nely, Edgardo "Mattatracks" Matta, and Salvadoran production duo Crooked Stilo produced or co-produced one track on the album. The intro, interlude and outro were produced by Ramsis.

Barrio Fino was recorded between 2003 and 2004 at Daddy Yankee's El Cartel Studios in Villa Kennedy, San Juan, Puerto Rico and Luny Tunes' Mas Flow Studios in Carolina, Puerto Rico. The album was mixed by Luny Tunes, Paul "Echo" Irizarry and Jose "Hyde" Cotto at Mas Flow Studios and The Lab Studios. The mastering by Nestor Salomon at Digital Recording Services. The cover art features Daddy Yankee in a black-and-white aesthetic. He hired Elastic People music video director and designer Carlos Perez, who wanted to "position him as one of the founders of the movement and portray him on a sophisticated note." Daddy Yankee suggested a "monumental" black-and-white cover inspired from historical photographs involving American professional boxer and activist Muhammad Ali.

== Release ==
Barrio Fino was released on July 13, 2004. In the week ending on July 31, the record debuted at number one on the US Top Latin Albums, becoming the first reggaeton album to peak and debut at the top of that chart. It also debuted at number one on the US Tropical Albums and at number 67 on the Billboard 200, selling almost 18,000 copies in it first week. The album sold over 200,000 copies worldwide on it first two weeks. The release of "Gasolina" as the album's lead single enhanced its chart performance and it topped the Top Latin Albums chart for a second week in 2005, remaining there for another 22 non-consecutive weeks, for a total of 24 weeks at number one. It also re-entered the Billboard 200 in the week ending on December 18, 2004, and peaked at number 26 on the April 16, 2005, issue. It topped the Tropical Albums chart for 28 non-consecutive weeks. It also charted for 54 weeks on the Billboard 200, and 42 weeks on Tropical Albums. A bonus track version of Barrio Fino, which includes a salsa remix of "Sabor a Melao" and a bachata remix for "Lo Que Pasó, Pasó", was released on May 23, 2005.

In 2005, the album became the first reggaeton record to chart in Europe, peaking at number 26 in Portugal and Spain, at number 28 in Switzerland, at number 46 in Italy, at number 51 in Austria, and at number 67 in France. On May 17, 2005, the Recording Industry Association of America (RIAA) certified Barrio Fino platinum for having shipped one million copies in the United States. On March 3, 2006, it was also certified platinum by the Mexican Association of Producers of Phonograms and Videograms (AMPROFON) for sales of 100,000 units in Mexico. The album also received a platinum certification by the Argentine Chamber of Phonograms and Videograms Producers (CAPIF) on March 22, 2005, for sales of over 40,000 units. Barrio Fino was the fourth and 10th best selling album of 2005 in Venezuela and Chile, respectively, and was certified gold for selling 10,000 units across Central America. For several weeks in May and June 2005, El Nacional listed ''Barrio Fino'' as the best-selling album in Latin America.

In Canada, sales for Barrio Fino were considerably lower. Despite Daddy Yankee being one of the first reggaeton artists to receive airplay there, the album had sold only 9,300 units as of September 2005, according to Nielsen SoundScan. According to The Record, Barrio Fino shipped five million copies worldwide as of June 2006. In the United States, Barrio Fino became the best-selling reggaeton album of 2004, the best- selling tropical recording of 2004, and the best-selling Latin album of 2005 and the 2000s decade. As of October 2017, the record has sold 1,083,000 copies in the United States, making it the seventh best-selling Latin album in the country according to Nielsen SoundScan. As of July 2024, it sold over 2.2 miilon of equivalent album units in the United States. As of August 2005, Barrio Fino has sold three million of copies worldwide.

The bonus track version was re-released for digital stores and streaming platforms on July 21, 2017, under El Cartel Records and The Orchard, celebrating the album's 13th anniversary. It subsequently re-entered the US Top Latin Albums chart at number 13 on August 12, 2017. On the US Top Latin Albums chart, Barrio Fino charted for 262 non-consecutive weeks from July 31, 2004, to July 22, 2006, and from August 12, 2017, onwards.

=== Singles ===
"Gasolina" became the first of the album's singles to enter the Billboard Hot 100, peaking at number 32 on the week ending January 29, 2005. It also reached number 10 and 17 on the US Hot Rap Songs and Hot Latin Songs charts, respectively. Leila Cobo of Billboard stated that it could not pass its number 17 peak on the Hot Latin Songs chart because of the lack of urban music played on US Spanish-language radio stations at the time. Internationally, the song ranked within the top five in Denmark, Italy, Norway, Ireland and the United Kingdom. "Gasolina" did not chart in Japan, despite the track having shipped 100,000 units in the country as of September 2005.

The album's second single, "Lo Que Pasó, Pasó", peaked at number two on Hot Latin Songs and number six on the US Bubbling Under Hot 100 Singles list, where it charted for 18 weeks without entering the Hot 100. It also became Daddy Yankee's first number one on the US Tropical Airplay chart on March 12, 2005. Internationally, "Lo Que Pasó, Pasó" peaked at number 35 in Switzerland. The third single, "No Me Dejes Solo", peaked at number 32 on Hot Latin Songs and at number eight on Tropical Airplay. The fourth and final single from Barrio Fino, "Like You", peaked at number 78 on the Billboard Hot 100. "Tu Príncipe" peaked at number 35 on the US Hot Latin Songs chart on the issue dated April 8, 2006. Daddy Yankee stated in October 2014 that "Tu Príncipe" was not released as a single nor a promotional song, and that it charted "on its own, because of the fans."

== Critical reception ==
Professional ratings
Review scores
Source	Rating
AllMusic	5/5 stars
Christgau's Consumer Guide	(choice cut)
Pitchfork	9.3/10
The Record	3/5 stars
Rolling Stone	3.5/5 stars

Jason Birchmeier of AllMusic gave the album a 5 out of 5 score, praising its first half as "remarkably solid" but commenting that its final quarter "begins to grow tiresome" because of the record's length. He states that Daddy Yankee "deserves a lot of credit for the success of Barrio Fino, for his charisma, energy level, and command of the proceedings are well evident and often infectious." Birchmeier selected "Gasolina" and "Lo Que Pasó, Pasó" as the album's highlights, with minor highlights including "Dale Caliente," "No Me Dejes Solo," "Tu Príncipe," and "¿Qué Vas a Hacer?". He ended the review by saying that Barrio Fino is "a milestone reggaetón release for its time" alongside Don Omar's The Last Don.

Rolling Stone magazine's Christian Hoard gave it a 3.5 out of 5, stating that Barrio Fino is "the blingiest and most modern disc in current reggaeton" and highlighted the track "Gasolina" for its "slinky hook." The album was later ranked by the magazine as the 44th best record of 2005. On the 2005 year-end ranking of Rolling Stone Argentina, the album was ranked as the 47th best record of 2005, with the comment that "Daddy Yankee exploits a boricua version of 50 Cent's style." The magazine praised the album for its "elegant and fabulous rhythms" and ended the review by adding that "Barrio Fino is an agitated excursion to reggaeton's most rough pleasures."

Adam Webb of the BBC stated in his review that Daddy Yankee's "sheer energy" is where he "reigns supreme over the majority of his hip hop peers." He felt that the fusion of salsa, dancehall and hip-hop on "Lo Que Pasó, Pasó", "Sabor a Melao" and "Gasolina" "is like being strapped to a particularly lascivious booty." Journalist Ramiro Burr gave a positive review of the album. He said that "Gasolina" is "the engine driving this collection," describing the song as a basic reggae beat with a catchy chorus, and highlighted the dance tracks "No Me Dejes Solo" and "Like You". He also gave credit to Andy Montañez's vocals on "Sabor a Melao", which added "a soulful flavor to the track."

Kitty Empire of The Guardian wrote about "Gasolina" as a song that has "a spendidly infectious lurch." She also stated that the rest of the album "doesn't let up" by "updating the subgenre of Spanish-language hip-hop with a new swagger." An editor of the Indian music magazine The Record wrote a mixed review of Barrio Fino, stating that anyone who is not intimidated by the Spanish language barrier "will find this to be a good album," praising his "strong rhyming skills." The reviewer criticized the record because it "is not nearly as catchy or accessible as you might have expected it to be" but says that Daddy Yankee almost "lives up to the promise of the hype surrounding him." The album received a score of 3 out of 5.

=== Accolades ===
Publication	Accolade	Recipient	Year	Rank	Ref.
Rolling Stone	The Top 50 Records of 2005	Barrio Fino	2005	44	
The Guardian	50 Essential CDs From Around The World	Barrio Fino	2008	21	
Billboard	The 50 Greatest Latin Albums of the Past 50 Years	Barrio Fino	2015	—N/a	
Billboard	The 50 Greatest Latin Songs of All Time	"Gasolina"	2015	9	
Billboard	The 12 Best Dancehall & Reggaeton Choruses of the 21st Century	"Gasolina"	2017	8	
Billboard	The 50 Greatest Latin Songs of All Time (re-issue)	"Gasolina"	2017	10	
Rolling Stone	500 Greatest Albums of All Time	Barrio Fino	2020	473	
Los 600 de Latinoamérica	The 600 Albums of Latin America	Barrio Fino	2024	31	
Rolling Stone	The 250 Greatest Albums of the 21st Century So Far	Barrio Fino	2025	45	

Barrio Fino received a Latin Grammy Award for Best Urban Music Album at the 6th Annual Latin Grammy Awards. The lead single, "Gasolina", was nominated for Record of the Year, becoming the first reggaeton song to be so honored. The album also received a Billboard Music Award for Latin Album of the Year at the 16th Billboard Music Awards, ceremony where "Lo Que Pasó, Pasó" was nominated for Top Latin Song and Daddy Yankee was awarded Latin Albums Artist of the Year. Barrio Fino also received a Billboard Latin Music Award for Reggaeton Album of the Year, a Lo Nuestro Award for Urban Album of the Year, and a Latin Music Fan Award for Album of the Year.

"Gasolina" also received the Catchiest Tune award at the 2nd Premios Juventud. Its music video received a Latin Music Fan Award for Music Video of the Year and was nominated for a MTV2 Award at the 22nd MTV Video Music Awards and a MTV Video Music Awards Japan for Best Reggae Video. "Lo Que Pasó, Pasó" won an Urban Song of the Year award at the 18th Lo Nuestro Awards.

In 2006, Daddy Yankee received an ASCAP Award for Latin Songwriter of the Year for his work on "Gasolina", "Lo Que Pasó, Pasó" and "No Me Dejes Solo", among other songs. He was also awarded Artist of the Year at the 13th Billboard Latin Music Awards, and Urban Artist of the Year at the 18th Lo Nuestro Awards. He received the Premios Juventud award for Voice of the Moment and Favorite Urban Artist at the 2nd Premios Juventud awards show, and was also nominated for a Favorite Latin Artist award at the 33rd American Music Awards.

In 2015, Billboard included Barrio Fino on their unranked "50 Greatest Latin Albums of the Past 50 Years" list and, in 2017, named "Gasolina" the 10th best Latin song of all-time and the eighth best reggaeton chorus of the 21st century. On September 22, 2020, Rolling Stone updated their 500 Greatest Albums of All Time list placing Barrio Fino on the 473rd position. In 2022, Rolling Stone ranked "Gasolina" as the greatest reggaeton song of all time, while "Lo Que Pasó, Pasó" was placed at number 16.

== Legacy ==
The success of the album brought wealth to Daddy Yankee, who became the "messiah of reggaeton" according to Billboard, and inked a multi-year deal with the global athletic footwear company Reebok, launching a signature sport collection called DY in 2006. In August 2005, he signed a five-year contract with American record label Interscope Records, which distributed his subsequent albums Barrio Fino en Directo (2005), El Cartel: The Big Boss (2007) and Talento de Barrio (2008). That year, he produced and starred in his own semi-autobiographical feature film, Talento de Barrio, distributed by Paramount Pictures. The film, released in 2008, grossed $1.6 million at the box office in the United States as of November 2008.

Barrio Fino made history as the first reggaeton record to peak at number one on the US Top Latin Albums chart, as well as becoming the best-selling Latin album in the United States in 2005 and the 2000s decade. According to Billboard magazine, the commercial success of Barrio Fino "introduced Daddy Yankee to the mainstream market and made reggaeton an international [music] genre." In 2015, the magazine included the recording on its list of "50 Essential Latin Albums of the Last 50 years" (1965–2015). That same year, "Gasolina" was ranked ninth on Billboard's 50 Greatest Latin Songs of All Time, described as "the track that internationalized reggaeton" by making the genre a global phenomenon. Billboard included Daddy Yankee on its list of "The 30 Most Influential Latin Artists of All Time", citing "Gasolina" as the song that "brought the underground urban sound of the [Puerto Rican hoods] to the world."

In the United States, Latin album sales grew a startling 17.6% in the first half of 2005 in comparison to the previous year. Billboard's Leila Cobo cited that one of the reasons for this was the emergence of reggaeton and the commercial success of Barrio Fino. The commercial success of "Gasolina" in the country led to the creation of a new radio format and a Billboard chart, Latin Rhythm Airplay, in which Daddy Yankee eventually became the artist with the most total entries.

The album also enhanced Luny Tunes' production career. They were later recognized as the genre's hit-makers following the release of their studio albums Mas Flow 2 in 2005 and Mas Flow: Los Benjamins in 2006. Daddy Yankee credited Wisin & Yandel's collaboration on the track "No Me Dejes Solo" as the boost they needed to be internationally recognized. He considers "No Me Dejes Solo" as a "nightclub anthem" and "Lo Que Pasó, Pasó" a "Latin anthem" saying that both are contemporary and well received by fans. According to Leila Cobo of Billboard, the success of Barrio Fino "detonated a global reggaeton explosion that irrevocably altered the business, sound and aesthetic of Latin music."

According to Nestor Casonu, CEO of Casonu Strategic Management, "Daddy Yankee and 'Gasolina' triggered the explosion of urban Latin music worldwide." Daddy Yankee has claimed that the album's success gave impoverished children from barrios the hope of fame through a music career. Rachel Grace Amelda of Vice stated that "Daddy Yankee transcended being reduced to a one-hit wonder and started a movement that sent one resounding message to barrio kids: if Yankee can, I can too." On "I'm the Boss", a track from his 2013 mixtape King Daddy, Daddy Yankee revealed that "he is still spending his Barrio Fino money." In 2019, he celebrated the 15th anniversary of the album by posting on social media that it "changed the culture around the world, broke frontiers, and opened the doors for reggaeton music and the [urban movement] around the globe".

== Track listing ==
Barrio Fino track listing
No.	Title	Writer(s)	Producer(s)	Length
1.	"Intro"	Ramón Ayala	Ramsis	1:19
2.	"King Daddy"	Ayala	Luny Tunes	2:31
3.	"Dale Caliente"	Ayala	Monserrate & DJ Urba; Fido	3:15
4.	"No Me Dejes Solo" (featuring Wisin & Yandel)	Ayala; Juan Morera; Llandel Veguilla	Monserrate & DJ Urba; Fido	2:50
5.	"Gasolina"	Ayala; Eddie Ávila	Luny Tunes	3:12
6.	"Like You"	Ayala	Luny Tunes	3:22
7.	"El Muro"	Ayala	Monserrate & DJ Urba	2:59
8.	"Lo Que Pasó, Pasó"	Ayala; Joan Ortiz	Luny Tunes; Eliel	3:30
9.	"Tu Príncipe" (featuring Zion & Lennox)	Ayala; Felix Ortiz; Gabriel Pizzaro	Luny Tunes	3:25
10.	"Cuéntame"	Ayala	Luny Tunes; Eliel; Naldo	2:35
11.	"Santifica Tus Escapularios"	Ayala	Luny Tunes	3:19
12.	"Sabor a Melao" (featuring Andy Montañez)	Ayala; Andrés Montañez	DJ Nelson	3:43
13.	"El Empuje"	Ayala	Monserrate & DJ Urba	3:23
14.	"¿Qué Vas A Hacer?" (featuring May-Be)	Ayala	Fido	3:19
15.	"Salud y Vida"	Ayala	Crooked Stilo	3:26
16.	"Intermedio – Gavilán"	Ayala	Ramsis	1:12
17.	"Corazones"	Ayala	Echo; Diesel	3:29
18.	"Golpe de Estado" (featuring Tommy Viera)	Ayala; Dino Olavarrias	Luny Tunes; Nely	3:06
19.	"2 Mujeres"	Ayala	Luny Tunes	3:09
20.	"Saber Su Nombre"	Ayala	Edgardo Matta	3:38
21.	"Outro"	Ayala	Ramsis	5:42
Total length:				1:06:24

Bonus tracks
No.	Title	Writer(s)	Producer(s)	Length
22.	"Sabor a Melo" (Salsa Mix)	Ayala; Montañez	DJ Nelson	3:39
23.	"Lo Que Pasó, Pasó" (Bachata Mix)	Ayala; Ortiz	Luny Tunes; Eliel; Mr.G	3:49
Total length:				1:11:32

Special edition
No.	Title	Writer(s)	Producer(s)	Length
24.	"Gasolina" (Remix featuring N.O.R.E., Big Mato and Gemstar)	Ayala; Ávila; Victor Santiago	Luny Tunes	4:48
Total length:				1:16:20

== Personnel ==
Credits adapted from AllMusic and Discogs.

- Raymond Acosta – back vocals (6)
- Mark Allen – typography
- James Begera – design
- Martin Betz – photography
- Marcelo Castro – trumpet (15)
- Eddie Dee – songwriting (5)
- Diesel – producer (17)
- Echo – producer (17), mixing (all)
- Eliel – producer (8)
- Fido – producer (3, 4, 7, 14)
- Nestor Salomón - mastering
- Gavilán – lead vocals (1, 16)
- Glory – back vocals (3–5, 13)
- Hyde – mixing (all)
- Edgardo Matta – producer (20)
- May-Be – lead vocals (14), back vocals (6)
- Monserrate & DJ Urba – producer (3, 4, 7, 13, 14)
- Andy Montañez – lead vocals, songwriting (12)
- Naldo – producer (14), guitar (6)
- Notch – back vocals (15)
- DJ Nelson – producer (12)
- Nely – producer (18)
- Blacka-Nice – back vocals (3)
- Dino Olavarrias – songwriting (18)
- Joan Ortíz – songwriting (8)
- Carlos Perez – design, art direction
- Janice Quijano – wardrobe stylist
- Ramsis – producer (1, 16, 21)
- Jeorge Salgado – guitar (14)
- Sosa – producer (13)
- Crooked Stilo – producer (15)
- Luny Tunes – producer (2, 5, 6, 8–11, 19), mixing (all)
- Tommy Viera – lead vocals (18)
- Wisin & Yandel – lead vocals, songwriting (4)
- Daddy Yankee – lead vocals (all), songwriting (all), executive producer
- Zion & Lennox – lead vocals, songwriting (9)

== Charts ==
=== Weekly charts ===
Chart (2004)	Peak position
US Billboard 200	67
US Latin Albums (Billboard)	1
US Tropical Albums (Billboard)	1

Chart (2005)	Peak position
Argentina Albums Chart (CAPIF)	7
Chile Albums Chart (Associated Press)	5
Austrian Albums (Ö3 Austria)	51
French Albums (SNEP)	67
Italian Albums (FIMI)	46
Japanese Albums (Oricon)	22
Mexican Albums (AMPROFON)	8
Latin America Albums (El Nacional)	1
Portuguese Albums (AFP)	26
Spanish Albums (Promusicae)	26
Swiss Albums (Schweizer Hitparade)	28
US Billboard 200	26
US Latin Albums (Billboard)	1
US Rap Albums (Billboard)	16
US R&B/Hip-Hop Albums (Billboard)	33
US Tropical Albums (Billboard)	1

Chart (2006)	Peak position
Colombian Albums (Prodiscos)	11
Mexican Albums (AMPROFON)	8
US Latin Albums (Billboard)	9

Chart (2017)	Peak position
US Latin Albums (Billboard)	13

Chart (2018)	Peak position
US Latin Albums (Billboard)	33

Chart (2019)	Peak position
US Latin Albums (Billboard)	21

Chart (2025)	Peak position
Portuguese Streaming Albums (AFP)	179

=== Year-end charts ===
Chart (2004)	Position
US Latin Albums (Billboard)	19
US Tropical Albums (Billboard)	1

Chart (2005)	Position
Chilean Albums (FeriaDelDisco)	10
Mexican Albums (AMPROFON)	46
US Billboard 200	82
US Latin Albums (Billboard)	1
US Tropical Albums (Billboard)	1

Chart (2006)	Position
Mexican Albums (AMPROFON)	92
US Latin Albums (Billboard)	19

Chart (2017)	Position
US Latin Albums (Billboard)	63

Chart (2018)	Position
US Latin Albums (Billboard)	35

Chart (2019)	Position
US Latin Albums (Billboard)	35

Chart (2020)	Position
US Latin Albums (Billboard)	60

=== Decade-end charts ===
Chart (2000–09)	Position
US Latin Albums (Billboard)	1
US Top Latin Albums (Billboard)	9

== Certifications and sales ==
Region	Certification	Certified units/sales
Argentina (CAPIF)	Platinum	40,000^{^}
Chile	—	40,000
Italy (FIMI)	Gold	25,000^{‡}
Mexico (AMPROFON)	Platinum	100,000^{^}
United States (RIAA)	Platinum	1,083,000
Summaries
Central America	Gold	
^{^} Shipments figures based on certification alone.^{‡} Sales+streaming figures based on certification alone.

== See also ==
- 2004 in Latin music
- List of number-one Billboard Top Latin Albums of 2004
- List of number-one Billboard Top Latin Albums of 2005
- List of number-one Billboard Latin Rhythm Albums of 2005
- List of number-one Billboard Tropical Albums from the 2000s
- List of best-selling Latin albums in the United States
- List of best-selling Latin albums
