= List of Billboard Latin Rhythm Albums number ones of 2005 =

The Latin Rhythm Albums chart is a music chart published in Billboard magazine. This data is compiled by Nielsen SoundScan from a sample that includes music stores, music departments at electronics and department stores, internet sales (both physical and digital) and verifiable sales from concert venues in the United States to determine the top-selling Latin rhythm albums in the United States each week. The chart is composed of studio, live, and compilation releases by Latin artists performing in the Latin hip hop, urban, dance and reggaeton, the most popular Latin rhythm music genres.

== Albums ==
Chart date	Album	Artist(s)	Reference
May 21	Barrio Fino	Daddy Yankee	
May 28	Barrio Fino	Daddy Yankee	
June 4	Barrio Fino	Daddy Yankee	
June 11	Barrio Fino	Daddy Yankee	
June 18	Barrio Fino	Daddy Yankee	
June 25	Barrio Fino	Daddy Yankee	
July 2	Barrio Fino	Daddy Yankee	
July 9	Barrio Fino	Daddy Yankee	
July 16	Barrio Fino	Daddy Yankee	
July 23	Barrio Fino	Daddy Yankee	
July 30	Barrio Fino	Daddy Yankee	
August 6	Barrio Fino	Daddy Yankee	
August 13	Barrio Fino	Daddy Yankee	
August 20	Barrio Fino	Daddy Yankee	
August 27	Barrio Fino	Daddy Yankee	
September 3	Barrio Fino	Daddy Yankee	
September 10	Barrio Fino	Daddy Yankee	
September 17	Barrio Fino	Daddy Yankee	
September 24	Barrio Fino	Daddy Yankee	
October 1	Barrio Fino	Daddy Yankee	
October 8	Barrio Fino	Daddy Yankee	
October 15	Boy Wonder & Chencho Records Present: El Draft 2005	Various Artists	
October 22	Boy Wonder & Chencho Records Present: El Draft 2005	Various Artists	
October 29	Boy Wonder & Chencho Records Present: El Draft 2005	Various Artists	
November 5	Boy Wonder & Chencho Records Present: El Draft 2005	Various Artists	
November 12	Barrio Fino	Daddy Yankee	
November 19	Boy Wonder & Chencho Records Present: El Draft 2005	Various Artists	
November 26	Pa'l Mundo	Wisin & Yandel	
December 3	Pa'l Mundo	Wisin & Yandel	
December 10	Pa'l Mundo	Wisin & Yandel	
December 17	Pa'l Mundo	Wisin & Yandel	
December 24	Da Hitman Presents Reggaetón Latino	Don Omar	
December 31	Barrio Fino en Directo	Daddy Yankee	
