= Like You =

Like You may refer to:

- "Like You" (Bow Wow song), 2005
- "Like You" (Daddy Yankee song), 2005
- "Like You" (Kelis song), 2006
- "Like You" (Evanescence song), 2006
- "Like You (And Everyone Else)", 2010 song by Beth Hart from her 2010 album My California
