= Llamado de Emergencia =

2008 single by Daddy Yankee

- The Remixes cover

Single by Daddy Yankee

from the album Talento de Barrio
- Released: September 23, 2008
- Recorded: 2008
- Genre: Reggaeton
- Length: 3:59
- Label: Interscope; El Cartel
- Songwriter: Ramón Ayala
- Producers: Francisco "Luny" Saldaña; Predikador; Eli "El Musicólogo"

Daddy Yankee singles chronology
"Pose" (2008)	"Llamado de Emergencia" (2008)	"¿Qué Tengo Que Hacer?" (2009)

"Llamado de Emergencia" (English: "Emergency Call") is the second single by Puerto Rican reggaeton artist Daddy Yankee from the soundtrack to the motion picture Talento de barrio, released on September 23, 2008, by El Cartel Records. It is the third released promo single and second official single.

As part of Daddy Yankee's goal to experiment with different Latin musical styles, the song is a fusion of reggaeton and even Colombian styles of vallenato.

== Music video ==
The music video features Daddy Yankee waiting in a car, with his soon-to-be next single, "¿Qué Tengo Que Hacer?" playing. A woman shows up to his car, revealed to be his girlfriend, having arrived late. She and him start having an argument in a car. Soon afterwards, Yankee pulls out and gets into a car crash, leaving fatal injuries on his girlfriend. It is soon reported to 9-1-1, leaving Yankee to only reminisce about the memories he has of them spending time together, later going to her funeral to bring flowers to her body, but seeing her in a chair, crying. He then goes to see the body, and it is revealed he is the one who has died. Remembering everything, he awakes in the car that he was at the start, with her coming up to the car again, revealing it was a dream. This time he does not argue with her. The video was directed by Luis Enrique.

== Charts ==
Chart (2008–2009)	Peak position
Bolivia Airplay (Top Latino)	1
Chile Airplay (Los 40)	1
Colombia Airplay (EFE)	1
El Salvador (EFE)	9
Dominican Republic Airplay (Top Latino)	5
Honduras Airplay (EFE)	1
Mexico Airplay (Billboard)	39
Mexican Pop Airplay (Billboard)	21
Nicaragua Airplay (EFE)	3
Panama Airplay (Top Latino)	4
U.S. Billboard Hot Latin Songs	17
U.S. Billboard Latin Tropical Airplay	2
U.S. Billboard Latin Rhythm Airplay	3
U.S. Billboard Latin Pop Airplay	33
Venezuela Top 100 (Record Report)	2
Uruguay Airplay (Top Latino)	4

== Certifications ==
Region	Certification	Certified units/sales
Spain (Promusicae)	Platinum	60,000^{‡}
^{‡} Sales+streaming figures based on certification alone.
