= Pose (Daddy Yankee song) =

2008 single

Single by Daddy Yankee

from the album Talento de Barrio
- Released: May 14, 2008
- Recorded: 2008
- Genre: Reggaeton; Latin pop; electronica; electropop
- Length: 3:37
- Label: Machete; El Cartel
- Songwriter: Ramón Ayala
- Producers: Eli "El Musicólogo"; Menes

Daddy Yankee singles chronology
| "Ella Me Levantó" (2007) | "Pose" (2008) | "Llamado de Emergencia" (2008) |

"Pose" is the first single by Puerto Rico reggaeton artist Daddy Yankee from the movie soundtrack to the motion picture Talento de barrio, and was released on May 14, 2008, by Machete Music and El Cartel Records. The single was made available through online music stores on August 12, 2008. The song features different musical styles, ones that differ from Daddy Yankee's past singles. It is an electro song, which fuses other genres such as Latin pop, dance-pop, pop rap, dance, hip-hop and pop, as well as Latin and dance rhythms.

== Background ==
When I'm at shows, I see almost everyone with a camera, and they're all trying to give the best pose, especially the women. It's interesting to me how we're always trying to look good. That's the inspiration for the song.

— Ramón Ayala

== Music video ==
The music video for "Pose" was directed by Christian G. Fortes (Instagram @C_holiday40). It was released by Universal Music Group on June 26, 2008. Dance groups Jabbawockeez and Shhh! from America's Best Dance Crew make cameo appearances as well. The music video won Video of the Year at Lo Nuestro Awards 2009.

== Chart performance ==
"Pose" is the album's most successful single, peaking at number four on the Billboard Hot Latin Songs chart, as well as topping the Billboard Hot Latin Rhythm Airplay chart at number one. The single is Ayala's fifth top five single on the Billboard Hot Latin Songs chart, and his second consecutive top five single after "Ella Me Levantó". The song also peaked at number seven on the Billboard Latin Tropical Airplay chart.

== Charts ==
| Chart (2008–2009) | Peak position |
|---|---|
| Chile Airplay (EFE) | 1 |
| Mexican Pop Airplay (Billboard) | 18 |
| Mexico Airplay (Billboard) | 27 |
| Nicaragua Airplay (EFE) | 6 |
| Peru Airplay (Top Latino) | 1 |
| Hispanic American Airplay (Top Latino) | 8 |
| U.S Bubbling Under Hot 100 Singles (Billboard) | 23 |
| U.S. Billboard Hot Latin Songs | 4 |
| U.S. Billboard Latin Tropical Airplay | 7 |
| U.S. Billboard Latin Pop Airplay | 23 |
| U.S. Billboard Latin Rhythm Airplay | 1 |
| Venezuela (Record Report) | 7 |
| Venezuela Top Latino (Record Report) | 1 |

== Accolades ==
=== American Society of Composers, Authors, and Publishers Awards ===
| Year | Nominee / work | Award | Result |
|---|---|---|---|
| 2009 | "Pose" | Urban Song of the Year | Won |

== See also ==
- List of Billboard Latin Rhythm Airplay number ones of 2008
