= List of Billboard Latin Rhythm Albums number ones of 2006 =

The Latin Rhythm Albums chart is a music chart published in Billboard magazine. The data is compiled by Nielsen SoundScan from a sample that includes music stores, music departments at electronics and department stores, internet sales (both physical and digital) and verifiable sales from concert venues in the United States. The chart is composed of studio, live, and compilation releases by Latin artists performing in the Latin hip hop, urban, dance and reggaeton, the most popular Latin Rhythm music genres.

== Albums ==
| Chart date | Album | Artist(s) | Reference |
|---|---|---|---|
| January 7 | Barrio Fino en Directo | Daddy Yankee | |
| January 14 | Barrio Fino en Directo | Daddy Yankee | |
| January 21 | Barrio Fino en Directo | Daddy Yankee | |
| January 28 | Barrio Fino en Directo | Daddy Yankee | |
| February 4 | Barrio Fino en Directo | Daddy Yankee | |
| February 11 | Barrio Fino en Directo | Daddy Yankee | |
| February 18 | Barrio Fino en Directo | Daddy Yankee | |
| February 25 | Barrio Fino en Directo | Daddy Yankee | |
| March 4 | Barrio Fino en Directo | Daddy Yankee | |
| March 11 | Barrio Fino en Directo | Daddy Yankee | |
| March 18 | Barrio Fino en Directo | Daddy Yankee | |
| March 25 | Barrio Fino en Directo | Daddy Yankee | |
| April 1 | Barrio Fino en Directo | Daddy Yankee | |
| April 8 | Barrio Fino en Directo | Daddy Yankee | |
| April 15 | Barrio Fino en Directo | Daddy Yankee | |
| April 22 | Top of the Line | Tito El Bambino | |
| April 29 | Barrio Fino en Directo | Daddy Yankee | |
| May 6 | Barrio Fino en Directo | Daddy Yankee | |
| May 13 | Barrio Fino en Directo | Daddy Yankee | |
| May 20 | Barrio Fino en Directo | Daddy Yankee | |
| May 27 | Barrio Fino en Directo | Daddy Yankee | |
| June 3 | Pa'l Mundo | Wisin & Yandel | |
| June 10 | Kings of Kings | Don Omar | |
| June 17 | Kings of Kings | Don Omar | |
| June 24 | Kings of Kings | Don Omar | |
| July 1 | Kings of Kings | Don Omar | |
| July 8 | Kings of Kings | Don Omar | |
| July 15 | Hector "El Father" Present: Los Rompe Discotekas | Héctor el Father | |
| July 22 | Hector "El Father" Present: Los Rompe Discotekas | Héctor el Father | |
| July 29 | Kings of Kings | Don Omar | |
| August 5 | Kings of Kings | Don Omar | |
| August 12 | Kings of Kings | Don Omar | |
| August 19 | Kings of Kings | Don Omar | |
| August 26 | Kings of Kings | Don Omar | |
| September 2 | Kings of Kings | Don Omar | |
| September 9 | Kings of Kings | Don Omar | |
| September 16 | The Underdog/El Subestimado | Tego Calderón | |
| September 23 | The Underdog/El Subestimado | Tego Calderón | |
| September 30 | N.O.R.E. y la Familia...Ya Tú Sabe | N.O.R.E. | |
| October 7 | N.O.R.E. y la Familia...Ya Tú Sabe | N.O.R.E. | |
| October 14 | Mas Flow: Los Benjamins | Luny Tunes & Tainy | |
| October 21 | Mas Flow: Los Benjamins | Luny Tunes & Tainy | |
| October 28 | Mas Flow: Los Benjamins | Luny Tunes & Tainy | |
| November 4 | Mas Flow: Los Benjamins | Luny Tunes & Tainy | |
| November 11 | Mas Flow: Los Benjamins | Luny Tunes & Tainy | |
| November 18 | Mas Flow: Los Benjamins | Luny Tunes & Tainy | |
| November 25 | Los Vaqueros | Various Artists | |
| December 2 | Chosen Few II: El Documental | Boy Wonder | |
| December 9 | The Bad Boy | Héctor el Father | |
| December 16 | Los Vaqueros | Various Artists | |
| December 23 | Los Vaqueros | Various Artists | |
| December 30 | Los Vaqueros | Various Artists | |
