= Gangsta Zone =

2005 single by Snoop Dogg and Daddy Yankee

Single by Daddy Yankee featuring Snoop Dogg

from the album Barrio Fino en Directo
- Released: 2005
- Genre: Reggaeton; hardcore hip hop
- Length: 3:33
- Label: Interscope; El Cartel
- Songwriters: Ramón Ayala; Calvin Broadus
- Producers: Nely; Naldo

Daddy Yankee singles chronology
"Rompe" (2005)	"Gangsta Zone" (2005)	"Machucando" (2006)

Snoop Dogg singles chronology
"Real Soon" (2005)	"Gangsta Zone" (2005)	"Say Somethin'" (2006)

"Gangsta Zone" is a song by rappers Daddy Yankee and Snoop Dogg, released in 2005 as the second single from Yankee's album Barrio Fino en Directo.

== Music video ==
The music video was filmed on January 27, 2006, at locations around Torres Sabana, a public housing project in Carolina, one of the largest cities in Puerto Rico. The video is shot in grayscale, and Daddy Yankee said the video depicts "the real way we live on the island".

=== Charts ===
Chart (2006–07)	Peak position
Latin America MTV Top 20 Videos	12

== Remix ==
A remix of "Gangsta Zone" was also released, featuring reggaeton artists Héctor el Father, Yomo, Arcángel & De La Ghetto and Angel Doze. It is a diss track aimed towards Don Omar.

== Charts ==
Chart (2006–07)	Peak position
US Hot R&B/Hip-Hop Single Sales (Billboard)	37
US Latin Rhythm Airplay (Billboard)	21
US Latin Tropical Airplay (Billboard)	39
