= Tu Príncipe =

2004 single by Zion & Lennox and Daddy Yankee

Song by Daddy Yankee featuring Zion & Lennox

from the album Barrio Fino
- Released: 2005
- Genre: Reggaeton
- Length: 3:25
- Label: El Cartel; VI
- Songwriters: Ramón Ayala; Felix Ortiz; Gabriel Pizzaro
- Producer: Luny Tunes

Daddy Yankee featuring Zion & Lennox singles chronology
"Lo Que Pasó, Pasó" (2005)	"Tu Príncipe" (2005)	"Rompe" (2005)

"Tu Príncipe" (English: "Your Prince") is a song by Daddy Yankee from his album Barrio Fino, featuring Zion & Lennox.

== Charts ==
Chart (2005)	Peak position
Chile (Top 20)	19
U.S. Billboard Hot Latin Songs	35
U.S. Billboard Latin Rhythm Airplay	17
