= Somos de Calle =

2008 song performed by Daddy Yankee

Single by Daddy Yankee

from the album Talento de Barrio
- Released: March 1, 2008 (U.S. airplay); July 29, 2008 (digital download)
- Recorded: 2005–2008
- Genre: Malianteo; hip-hop
- Length: 3:34
- Label: Interscope; El Cartel
- Songwriter: Raymond Ayala
- Producers: Diesel; Echo

Music videos
- "Somos de Calle" (original) on YouTube
- "Somos de Calle" (remix) on YouTube

"Somos de Calle" (English: "We're from the Street") is a promo single by Puerto Rican reggaeton performer Daddy Yankee, released for promotion of the 2008 film Talento de barrio. It was released on July 29, 2008 by El Cartel Records.

== Music video ==
The original video features Daddy Yankee and shows his life from 1990 to 2008, showing his success over time. An official music video was released for the remix which features many artists from the reggaeton genre, with Arcángel, De la Ghetto, Guelo Star, MC Ceja, Julio Voltio, Ñejo, Chyno Nyno, Cosculluela, Baby Rasta, and Rafy Mercenario credited on the collaboration. Both original and remix videos were a major success on YouTube in terms of views, being watched over 30 million and 96 million times each, respectively.

== Charts ==
Chart (2008)	Peak position
Nicaragua Airplay (EFE)	10
U.S. Billboard Latin Rhythm Airplay	10
Venezuela Top Latino (Record Report)	1
