= ¿Qué Tengo Que Hacer? =

2009 single by Daddy Yankee

- Remix version cover

Single by Daddy Yankee

from the album Talento de Barrio
- Released: January 19, 2009; March 2009 (remix)
- Recorded: 2008
- Genre: Reggaeton; merengue
- Length: 3:38 (album version); 3:22 (remix featuring Jowell & Randy)
- Label: Interscope; El Cartel
- Songwriter: Ramón Ayala
- Producer: Musicólogo & Menes

Daddy Yankee singles chronology
"Llamado de Emergencia" (2008)	"¿Qué Tengo Que Hacer?" (2009)	"El Ritmo No Perdona (Prende)" (2009)

"¿Qué Tengo Que Hacer?" (English: "What Do I Have to Do?") is the third single by Daddy Yankee from the soundtrack Talento de Barrio released on 19 January 2009. The remix was released in March 2009; in it, Daddy Yankee and Jowell & Randy use the Auto-Tune effect in their respective verses. It received a nomination for Latin Rhythm Airplay Song of the Year at the 2010 Latin Billboard Music Awards.

== Remix ==
- "¿Qué Tengo Que Hacer?" featuring Jowell & Randy – 3:53
- "¿Qué Tengo Que Hacer?" featuring Omega "El Fuerte" (mambo version) – 5:21

== Music video ==
The music video features Daddy Yankee singing on a tropical beach in St. Thomas in the United States Virgin Islands.

== Charts ==
Chart (2009)	Peak position
Bolivia Airplay (Top Latino)	2
Colombia Airplay (EFE)	2
Chile Airplay (EFE)	2
El Salvador Airplay (Top Latino)	3
U.S. Billboard Latin Rhythm Airplay	9
U.S. Billboard Hot Latin Songs	22

== Certifications ==
Region	Certification	Certified units/sales
Italy (FIMI) "Si Te Vas" by Omega	Gold	50,000^{‡}
United States (RIAA) "Si Te Vas" by Omega	Platinum (Latin)	60,000^{‡}
^{‡} Sales+streaming figures based on certification alone.
