= Machucando =

Single by Daddy Yankee

from the album Barrio Fino en Directo
- Released: 2006
- Genre: Reggaeton
- Length: 2:59
- Label: El Cartel
- Songwriters: Eddie Ávila; Ramón Ayala
- Producer: Luny Tunes

Daddy Yankee singles chronology
"Gangsta Zone" (2006)	"Machucando" (2006)	"El Truco" (2006)

"Machucando" (English: "Crushing") is the third single by Daddy Yankee from his album Barrio Fino en Directo. Although it did not have a music video, it received much radio airplay and became one of Daddy Yankee's best-known songs. The song was written by Daddy Yankee himself and co-written by Eddie Ávila. It was produced by Luny Tunes.

== Charts ==
=== Weekly charts ===
Chart (2006)	Peak position
US Bubbling Under Hot 100 (Billboard)	7
US Hot Latin Songs (Billboard)	2
US Latin Rhythm Airplay (Billboard)	3
US Tropical Airplay (Billboard)	2
Venezuela (National-Report)	14

=== Year-end charts ===
Chart (2006)	Position
US Hot Latin Songs (Billboard)	7
