= El Truco =

2006 single by Daddy Yankee

Single by Daddy Yankee

from the album Barrio Fino en Directo
- Released: 2006
- Genre: Reggaeton
- Length: 3:39
- Label: El Cartel
- Songwriters: Ramón Ayala; Sam "Fish" Fisher; Alex Monserrate; Urbani Motta
- Producers: Monserrate & DJ Urba; Sam "Fish" Fisher

Daddy Yankee singles chronology
"Machucando" (2006)	"El Truco" (2006)	"Impacto" (2007)

"El Truco" (English: "The Trick") is the fourth and last single by Daddy Yankee from his album Barrio Fino en Directo.

== Charts ==
Chart (2006)	Peak position
U.S. Billboard Latin Rhythm Airplay	24
U.S. Billboard Latin Tropical Airplay	23
