= Papa A.P. =

- Born: Papa A.P. January 6, 1982 (age 44); Chalatenango, El Salvador
- Genres: Reggaeton
- Occupation: Singer
- Years active: 1998–present

Papa A.P. (born January 6, 1982, in Chalatenango, El Salvador) is a singer and producer of reggaeton. His biggest hits are his cover version of "Gasolina" and "Entre tu y yo (entre toi et moi)" (featuring Linda), released in 2005. He has eight brothers and sisters.

== Discography ==
=== Albums ===
| Year | Title | Chart | Certification (FR) |
| Year | Title | FR | Certification (FR) |
|---|---|---|---|
| 1998 | Renaissance | — | — |
| 2005 | Assesina | 128 | — |

=== Singles ===
| Year | Title | Chart | | | | | | Certification (FR) |
| Year | Title | FR | BEL (WA) | SWI | AUS | SP | GER | Certification (FR) |
|---|---|---|---|---|---|---|---|---|
| 2005 | "Gasolina" | 8 | 10 | 14 | 65 | 18 | 46 | Silver |
| 2005 | "Entre tu y yo (entre toi et moi)" | 12 | 12 | 30 | — | — | — | Silver |
