= The Record (music magazine) =

Monthly music magazine

- Categories: Music magazine
- Frequency: Monthly
- Founded: 1998
- Country: India
- Based in: Mumbai
- Website: The Record

The Record is a monthly music magazine in India. It was established in 1998. The magazine covers articles on pop, rock, hip-hop as well as Bollywood music reviews.

The magazine is published from Mumbai and published and edited by Sunand Bhojani. The magazine claims to have over 75,000 readers per month. In 2007 the magazine also started focussing on Indian acts who have an international appeal.
