= The Big Boss Tour =

2007–08 concert tour by Daddy Yankee

The Big Boss World Tour
- Tour by Daddy Yankee
- Location: North America • South America • Europe
- Associated album: El Cartel: The Big Boss
- Legs: 3
- No. of shows: 24 in North America; 23 in South America; 6 in Europe; 51 total

Daddy Yankee concert chronology
- Barrio Fino World Tour (2004–06); The Big Boss World Tour (2007–08); Talento de Barrio Tour (2009)

The Big Boss World Tour was a concert tour by reggaeton singer Daddy Yankee to promote his album El Cartel: The Big Boss. This was his second arena tour in the United States and his first official world tour. The tour started on August 24, 2007, at the Coliseo de Puerto Rico and was expected to end on December 8, 2007, in Cali's Estadio Pascual Guerrero. However, due to the success of his soundtrack Talento de Barrio, more dates were added and the tour extended to 2008.

== Background ==
Barrio Fino become the best selling reggaeton album of all time selling more than three million copies worldwide and was one of the few albums in Spanish to sell more than one million copies in the United States. After his Barrio Fino World Tour was concluded, he started to work on his next album. On April 16, 2007, MTV and Billboard announced the dates of the arena tour in the United States and mentioned that he would also perform 20-plus concerts in Mexico and South America through early December. In those markets, he would play both arenas and 30,000 to 40,000-capacity stadiums. Initial plans of the tour was to visited 15 countries and 40 cities in Latin America by the end of 2007. However, this plans wasn't materialized due unknown reasons.

== Overview ==
In the United States, Billboard reported that ticket prices ranged from $40 to $100. Several dates were reported as sold out, although some media outlets described the Madison Square Garden concert as drawing a modest audience. Local reports also indicated that the Houston show at Toyota Center sold only about one-third of the venue’s 18,000-seat capacity.

In his native Puerto Rico, both concerts were sold out and in Bolivia the media reported over 50,000 fans in the venue. In Torreon, Mexico, over 7,500 showed up to the concert. The 16 United States shows reported on the tour averaged about $300,000 per show with a ticket average of 5,441.

In the Dominican Republic, the media reported that both concerts were sold out. In Santo Domingo, the attendance was more than 8,000. In Maturi, Venezuela broke attendance records at the venue with more than 30,000 fans.

== Tour dates ==
Date	City	Country	Venue
The Americas
August 24, 2007	San Juan	Puerto Rico	Coliseo de Puerto Rico José Miguel Agrelot
August 25, 2007	San Juan	Puerto Rico	Coliseo de Puerto Rico José Miguel Agrelot
August 31, 2007	Chicago	United States	Allstate Arena
September 2, 2007	Grand Prairie	United States	Texas Trust CU Theatre
September 7, 2007	New York	United States	Madison Square Garden
September 8, 2007	Washington, D.C	United States	Patriot Center
September 9, 2007	Uncasville	United States	Mohegan Sun Arena
September 13, 2007 (Note: This concert was part of Ferias International of Barquisimeto)	Barquisimeto	Venezuela	Complejo Ferial Barquisimeto
September 14, 2007	Miami	United States	American Airlines Arena
September 15, 2007	Orlando	United States	TD Waterhouse
September 20, 2007	Hidalgo	United States	Dodge Arena
September 22, 2007	Laredo	United States	Laredo Entertainment Center
September 23, 2007	Houston	United States	Toyota Center
September 29, 2007	Tucson	United States	Anselmo Valencia Tori Amphitheatre
September 30, 2007	Las Vegas	United States	Orleans Arena
October 5, 2007	Mountain View	United States	Shoreline Amphitheatre
October 6, 2007	Los Angeles	United States	Gibson Amphitheatre
October 7, 2007 (Note: This concert was part of Mega Palooza)	Boqueron	Puerto Rico	TBA
October 10, 2007	Torreon	Mexico	Estadio Revolución
October 11, 2007	Tijuana	Mexico	Estadio de los Toros
October 12, 2007	Monterrey	Mexico	Arena Monterrey
October 13, 2007	Luis Potosi	Mexico	Estadio de Beisbol
October 16, 2007	Cozumel	Mexico	Estadio “Javier Rojo Gómez”
October 18, 2007	Guadalajara	Mexico	Auditorio Metropolitano
November 2, 2007	Maracaibo	Venezuela	Plaza del Buen Maestro
November 16, 2007	Cuencia	Ecuador	Estadio Alejandro Serrano de Cuenca
November 17, 2007	Guayaquil	Ecuador	Estadio Alberto Spencer de Guayaquil.
November 22, 2007	Santiago	Chile	Pista Atlética Estadio Nacional
December 1, 2007	Santa Cruz	Bolivia	Estadio Santa Cruz de la Sierra
December 6, 2007	Bogota	Colombia	Parque Simon Bolivar
December 7, 2007	Medellin	Colombia	El Estadio Atanasio Giradot
December 9, 2007	Cali	Colombia	Estadio Pascual Guerrero
December 15, 2007	Ciudad de Guatemala	Guatemala	Estadio Cementos Progreso
December 29, 2007 (Note: This concert was part of Party of Barbosa)	Bayamon	Puerto Rico	Residencial José Celso Barbosa
February 2, 2008 (Note: This concert was part of Jaco Beach Music Festival 2008)	San Jose	Costa Rica	Playa Jaco
March 22, 2008	Porlamar	Venezuela	TBA
March 27, 2008	Higuerote	Venezuela	Higuerote Airport
April 12, 2008 (Note: This concert was part of Las Justas de Ponce)	Ponce	Puerto Rico	TBA
April 19, 2008	La Paz	Bolivia	Estadio Hernando Siles
May 29, 2008	Maturín	Venezuela	Estadio Monumental de Maturin
June 6, 2008	Lima	Peru	Estadio Monumental
June 7, 2008 (Note: The concert was part Urban Dance Co-healine Tego Calderon and Sean Paul.)	Arequia	Peru	Estadio de la Universidad Nacional San Agustín
Europe
June 13, 2008 (Note: This concert was part of Son Music Festival Son 2008)	Seville	Spain	Rocío Jurado Auditorium
June 14, 2008	Rotterdam	Netherlands	Ahoy
June 15, 2008 (Note: This concert was part of Son Fan Son Music Festival 2008)	Madrid	Spain	Palacio Vistalegre
June 20, 2008 (Note: This concert was part of Son Fan Son Music Festival 2008)	Bilbao	Spain	Bilbao Exhibition Centre
June 21, 2008 (Note: This concert was part of Son Fan Son Music Festival 2008)	Benidorm	Spain	Plaza Temática Terra Mítica
June 22, 2008 (Note: This concert was part of Son Fan Son Music Festival 2008)	Barcelona	Spain	La Folie
Americas
August 16, 2008 (Note: This concert was part of Calibash 2008)	Los Angeles	United States	Staples Center
July 25, 2008	Mérida	Mexico	Estadio Carlos Iturralde
August 29, 2008	Perreira	Colombia	Estadio Hernán Ramírez Villegas
October 24, 2008	Asuncion	Paraguay	Club Olimpia
October 25, 2008	Buenos Aires	Argentina	Luna Park
October 26, 2008	Buenos Aires	Argentina	Luna Park
November 18, 2008 (Note: This concert was part of Feria de la Chinita 2008)	Maracaibo	Venezuela	Basilica of Our Lady of Chiquinquirá, Maracaibo
December 13, 2008	Puerto Ordaz	Venezuela	Polideportivo Cachamay
December 14, 2008	Valencia	Venezuela	Forum de Valencia
December 18, 2008	Santo Domingo	Dominican Republic	Palacio de los Deportes
December 20, 2008	Santiago De Los Caballeros	Dominican Republic	Gran Arena del Cibao

=== Box Office Data ===
City	Country	Attedance	Box Office
San Juan	Puerto Rico	17,990 / 21,004 (86%)	$279,647
Orlando	United States	2,474 / 6,205 (40%)	$170,088
Laredo	United States	5,099 / 7,192 (71%)	$266,804
Total		25,593 / 34,401 (74%)	$716,536

== Cancelled shows ==
List of cancelled concerts, showing date, city, country, venue, and reason for cancellation
Date	City	Country	Venue	Reason
September 2, 2007	Boston	United States	Agannis Arena	Unknown
September 16, 2007	Duluth	United States	The Arena At Gwinnett Center	Unknown
September 23, 2007	San Antonio	United States	AT&T Center	Unknown
September 28, 2007	Phoenix	United States	U.S Airways Arena	Unknown
September 30, 2007	Fresno	United States	Save Smart Arena	Unknown
October 6, 2007	Culiacán	Mexico	Estadio Banorte	Unknown
October 7, 2007	Los Angeles	United States	Gibson Amphitheatre	Unknown
October 13, 2007	Dallas	United States	American Airlines Center	Unknown
October 20, 2007	Culiacan	Mexico	Estadio Banorte	Logistic Issues
October 24, 2007	Tegucigalpa	Honduras	Estadio Chochi Sosa	Unknown
October 26, 2007	San Pedro Sula	Honduras	Estadio Francisco Morazan	Unknown
November 1, 2007	Managua	Nicaragua	Estadio Nacional Denis Martinez	Unknown
November 3, 2007	San Salvador	El Salvador		Unknown
November 7, 2007	San Jose	Costa Rica	Estadio Saprisa	Unknown
November 9, 2007	Valencia	Venezuela	Forum de valencia	Schedule Conflicts
November 17, 2007	Quito	Ecuador	Estado Olimpico Atahualpa	Schedule Conflicts
November 22, 2007	Asuncion	Paraguay	Club Olimpia	Schedule Conflicts
November 24, 2007	Lima	Peru	Estadio Monumental	Schedule Conflicts
November 25, 2007	Caracas	Venezuela	Poliedro de Caracas	Schedule Conflicts
November 29, 2007	Provincia	Chile	Estadio de la Provincia	Logistic Problems
December 5, 2007	Buenos Aires	Argentina	Luna Park	Unknown
December 22, 2007	Santo Domingo	Dominican Republic	Estadio Olimipico Felix Sanchez	Lack of Sponsorship
