= Future Static =

Australian metal core group

- Origin: Melbourne, Australia
- Genre: Metalcore
- Years active: 2016–present
- Label: Wild Thing
- Members: Amariah Cook – Lead Vocals; Kira Neil – Bass / Vocals; Ryan Qualizza – Guitar; Jack Smith – Guitar; Jackson Trudel – Drums

Future Static are an Australian metalcore band formed in 2016 in Melbourne.

In November 2026, their second studio album Ornaments & Memories became their first to enter the ARIA top 50.

== History ==
In March 2018, the group released their debut EP, Want.

In April 2020, they released their second EP, Fatalists, which Jodie Sloan from The AU Review gave it 4/5 calling it "a fury-filled home run".

The group signed with Wild Thing Records in 2021.

In March 2022, they were the Triple J UNIFY competition winners.

In 2023, they released their debut studio album Liminality.

In November 2026, the group released their second studio album Ornaments & Memories. Benedetta Baldin from Fem Metal said "Future Static's eagerly awaited second album displays a darker and more philosophical side than their debut LP Liminality, exploring internal and external conflict, growth, change and love."

== Discography ==
=== Studio albums ===
List of studio albums, with selected details
Title	Album details	Peak chart positions
Title	Album details	AUS
Liminality	Released: 24 November 2023; Label: Wild Thing	-
Ornaments & Memories	Released: 6 November 2026; Label: Wild Thing	33

=== Extended plays ===
List of EPs, with selected details
Title	EP details
Want	Released: March 2018; Format: digital; Label: Future Static
Fatalists	Released: April 2020; Format: digital; Label: Future Static
