= Talento de barrio =

2008 film directed by José Iván Santiago

- Promotional film poster
- Directed by: José Iván Santiago
- Written by: George Rivera; Ángel M. Sanjurjo; Edgar Soberón Torchia
- Produced by: George Rivera; Ángel M. Sanjurjo; Daddy Yankee
- Cinematography: Leslie Colombani Jr.
- Edited by: José Iván Santiago
- Music by: Sam FISH Fisher (under pseudonym Samuel López)
- Distributed by: Maya Entertainment
- Release date: August 14, 2008
- Running time: 106 minutes
- Country: Puerto Rico
- Language: Spanish
- Box office: $1,666,769

Talento de barrio (English: Hood Talent) is a film released on October 10, 2008, by Maya Entertainment, starring Daddy Yankee. The film was directed by José Iván Santiago, and written by George Rivera and Ángel M. Sanjurjo, with additional material by Edgar Soberón Torchia. It was also the first movie Daddy Yankee co-produced. In the United States it was a major success, although it was not launched in all the country. It was shown in the major cities like New York City, Los Angeles, and some parts of New Jersey.

In Latin America, it was shown in Puerto Rico and Dominican Republic. The DVD of the movie was released in all the countries of Latin America. Big sales went on in Central America, mostly in El Salvador.

== Plot ==
Ramón Ayala (better known as Daddy Yankee) stars as Edgar Dinero, a young man from the streets of Puerto Rico who gets tangled-up in the street life of his neighborhood. While on the wrong path, Edgar encounters corruption among his supposed crew, while simultaneously falling in love with an uptown girl, Soribel (played by Katiria Soto), from whom he must conceal his strong feelings for.

Dinero's interest in music leads to an initial studio recording session in New York City, which does not go well. It seems he is lacking energy, until Soribel, his love interest, shows up in New York. Dinero then begins to make stronger, more passionate music.

Multiple gunshot scenes occur throughout the film, taking place both in Puerto Rico and in New York City.

The movie was mostly shot in the Barriada Morales, a marginalized community, reflecting the "thug" life in Caguas, Puerto Rico. Other places where filming took place were at Puerto Nuevo, San Juan, and in New York City.

== Cast ==
- Daddy Yankee – Edgar "Dinero"
- Maestro – Jeico
- Katiria Soto – Soribel
- César Farrait – Wichy
- Angélica Alcaide – Natasha
- Norma Colón – Edgar's mother
- Norman Santiago – Matías
- Rafael Acevedo – Matías's partner
- Welmo E. Romero-Joseph – Leo
- Rey Pirín – Javier
- Pepe Fuentes – Don Joaquín
- Moncho Conde – Popó
- Gringo – Angelo
- Eric Rodríguez – Wito
- Alexandra Cheron – Carolina
- Glory – Tata
- Zojaira Martínez – Ana
- Julio Voltio – Himself
- Eddie Dee – Jay
- Friend Zone Guy – Gazoo Star "El Jamón"
- Pedro Prez
- Christian Santiago – Edger
- Federico Cardona (DjSolid) – Gatillero Oscar 2
- José López – Juan de Dios
- Kaly Cordova – Bartender

== Promotion ==
=== Soundtrack ===
A soundtrack was released, featuring music by Daddy Yankee written only for the film. The soundtrack, however, does not include the film score, composed by Sam FISH Fisher. The soundtrack features four singles "Pose", "Somos de Calle", "¿Qué Tengo Que Hacer?", and "Llamado de Emergencia". The music derives from Daddy Yankee's typical reggaeton style.

=== Home video ===
Talento de barrio was released in the United States, Canada and Puerto Rico on November 25, 2008 on DVD and Blu-ray Disc formats. The film is featured in Spanish and is subtitled in English on both the DVD and Blu-ray Disc versions.

== Reception ==
The film had positive reviews in Puerto Rico. On Rotten Tomatoes, Talento de barrio has received negative reviews, garnering 0% approval. V.A. Musetto of New York Post said in his review for the film: "Reggaeton star Daddy Yankee holds his own in his big-screen acting debut, Talento de barrio. Too bad he's saddled with a generic script, based loosely on his own life". Monika Fabian of Time Out New York said: "Just as reggaetón is a fusion of hip-hop, reggae and traditional Puerto Rican rhythms, Talento de barrio is also a mixture, albeit a woefully derivative one, of 8 Mile, Menace II Society and Carlito's Way".

== See also ==
- 2008 in film
- Crime in Puerto Rico
- List of hood films
