= Rompe =

Single by Daddy Yankee

from the album Barrio Fino en Directo
- Released: September 30, 2005
- Recorded: 2005
- Genre: Reggaeton
- Length: 3:10
- Label: El Cartel; Interscope
- Songwriters: Ramón Ayala; Colombo
- Producers: Sam "Fish" Fisher; Monserrate & DJ Urba

Daddy Yankee singles chronology
"Tu Príncipe" (2005)	"Rompe" (2005)	"Gangsta Zone" (2005)

"Rompe" (English: "Break It") is a song recorded by Puerto Rican rapper Daddy Yankee. The song held the number one spot on Billboard's Hot Latin Tracks chart for over three months and reached a peak position of number 24 on the Billboard Hot 100 chart of the same publication, showcasing an evident trend among Latin songs having great cross-over appeal among the mainstream American market (since Shakira and Alejandro Sanz's "La Tortura" entered the top 20 on the same chart). The music video was in heavy rotation on MTV becoming one of the few reggaeton videos to do so reaching the position number 10 of Billboard MTV Video Monitor in 2006.

== Remix ==
A remix of "Rompe" has been released that features G-Unit members Lloyd Banks and Young Buck. It was nominated for "Best Latin/Reggaeton Track" at the 22nd Annual International Dance Music Awards in 2007, which was ultimately won by Shakira and Wyclef Jean with their number one single "Hips Don't Lie".

== Chart performance ==
=== Weekly charts ===
Chart (2005–2006)	Peak position
Colombia (Associated Press)	8
Costa Rica (ACAN-EFE)	10
German Singles Chart	64
Peru Top 100	3
Honduras (ACAN-EFE)	1
Hispanic-American Airplay (Top Latino)	2
US Billboard Hot 100	24
US Hot Latin Songs (Billboard)	1
US Latin Urban Top 30 (Radio & Records)	1
US Tropical Top 30 (Radio & Records)	1
US Rap Airplay (Billboard)	16
US Hot R&B/Hip-Hop Songs (Billboard)	89
US Pop Airplay (Billboard)	19
US Rhythmic Airplay (Billboard)	13
Venezuela (National-Report)	9

=== Year-end charts ===
Chart (2006)	Position
US Billboard Hot 100	74
US Hot Latin Songs (Billboard)	3

=== All-time charts ===
Chart (2021)	Position
US Hot Latin Songs (Billboard)	38

== Certifications and sales ==
Region	Certification	Certified units/sales
United States (RIAA) Mastertone	Platinum	1,000,000^{*}
^{*} Sales figures based on certification alone.

== Release history ==
Release dates and formats for "Rompe"
Region	Date	Format	Label(s)	Ref.
United States	March 7, 2006	Mainstream airplay	Interscope; The Cartel	

== See also ==
- List of Billboard Latin Rhythm Airplay number ones of 2006
