= Lo Que Pasó, Pasó =

2004 single by Daddy Yankee

Single by Daddy Yankee

from the album Barrio Fino
- Released: May 16, 2004
- Genre: Reggaeton; tropical; merengue; bachata
- Length: 3:30
- Label: Machete; El Cartel; VI
- Songwriters: Joan Ortiz; Ramón Ayala
- Producers: Luny Tunes; Eliel

Daddy Yankee singles chronology
"No Me Dejes Solo" (2004)	"Lo Que Pasó, Pasó" (2004)	"Like You" (2005)

"Lo Que Pasó, Pasó" (English: "What Happened, Happened") is a single by Puerto Rican rapper Daddy Yankee from his third studio album Barrio Fino. It was released in September 2004 by Machete Music and El Cartel Records. It is known to be one of Daddy Yankee's signature songs, and also one of his most successful singles and won the Lo Nuestro Award for Urban Song of the Year.

The song became Daddy Yankee's third most successful in the United States during 2005, behind "Gasolina" (Hot 100 peak number 32) and "Like You" (Hot 100 peak number 72). The single was almost able to chart on the U.S. Billboard Hot 100, but managed to chart on the Bubbling Under Hot 100 Singles chart at number six. It was also a major success on the U.S. Billboard Hot Latin Songs chart, peaking in the top five at number two and number one on the Tropical Songs chart where it was the best-performing track of the year. Internationally, it was even able to chart on the Swiss Top 100 Singles Chart at number 35.

== Track listings and formats ==
US and UK CD single

1. "Lo Que Pasó, Pasó" (Radio Version) – 3:30
2. "Lo Que Pasó, Pasó" (Bachata Mix) – 3:47

US and UK 12-inch vinyl

1. "Lo Que Pasó, Pasó" (Radio Version) – 3:30
2. "Lo Que Pasó, Pasó" (Bachata Mix) – 3:47
3. "Sabor a Melao" – 3:43
4. "Corazones" – 3:29

== Official versions ==
- Album version – 3:30
- Bachata remix – 3:47

== Charts ==
Chart (2004–06)	Peak position
Mexico Tropical (Monitor Latino)	1
Honduras (ACAN-EFE)	4
Switzerland (Schweizer Hitparade)	35
US Bubbling Under Hot 100 (Billboard)	6
US Hot Latin Songs (Billboard)	2
US Rhythmic Airplay (Billboard)	38
Venezuela (Notimex)	2

== Certifications ==
Region	Certification	Certified units/sales
Spain (Promusicae)	2× Platinum	120,000^{‡}
^{‡} Sales+streaming figures based on certification alone.

== See also ==
- List of Billboard Latin Rhythm Airplay number ones of 2005
