= Gasolina =

2004 single by Daddy Yankee

Single by Daddy Yankee

from the album Barrio Fino
- Language: Spanish
- B-side: "Machete"
- Released: October 2004
- Genre: Reggaeton
- Length: 3:12
- Label: VI Music; UMG
- Songwriters: Ramón Ayala; Eddie Ávila
- Producer: Luny Tunes

Daddy Yankee singles chronology
"King Daddy" (2004)	"Gasolina" (2004)	"No Me Dejes Solo" (2005)

Music video
- "Gasolina" on YouTube

"Gasolina" (Spanish for "Gasoline") is a song on Puerto Rican rapper Daddy Yankee's 2004 album Barrio Fino (Nice 'Hood). Glory sings the line "dame más gasolina" ("give me more gas"), although she is not credited. The song was released as the album's lead single in October 2004 and became a hit in 2005, peaking inside the top 10 on some of the charts it entered. "Gasolina" was the first reggaeton song to be nominated for the Latin Grammy Award for Record of the Year. Also, it was the first reggaeton song to hit the Top 40 on US Hot 100 while the music video receive heavy rotation on MTV.

In 2015, the song was ranked number 22 on the "50 Greatest Latin Songs of All Time" list according to Billboard. In 2018, it was ranked number 38 on Rolling Stone's "50 Greatest Latin Pop Songs." In 2017, it was included on Billboard's "12 Best Dancehall & Reggaeton Choruses of the 21st Century" at number eight. In 2021, it was ranked number 50 on Rolling Stone's "500 Greatest Songs of All Time", and a year later it was ranked at the first place on their 2022 "100 Greatest Reggaeton Songs of All Time" list. In 2023, "Gasolina" was selected by the Library of Congress for preservation in the United States National Recording Registry as being "culturally, historically, or aesthetically significant."

== Background ==
"Gasolina" was composed in 2003 by Daddy Yankee and Eddie Dee, assisted by a production duo known as Luny Tunes. Daddy Yankee's album Barrio Fino was released in July 2004, containing the song "Gasolina". At the beginning of August, Daddy Yankee shot a video for the song in the Dominican Republic's capital city, Santo Domingo, at the Autodrómo Internacional de Las Américas motorsports track and in the historic center of town, the Zona Colonial. The song was released as a single in the US in October 2004, supported by a television appearance by Daddy Yankee on MTV's Total Request Live on November 4, when the video was introduced. By November 6, WSKQ-FM in New York City reported "Gasolina" in their top 10 rotation, and WRTO-FM in Florida said the song was their number one most-played track. It entered the US Billboard Hot 100 chart a week later, rising to number 32 on January 28, 2005. "Gasolina" was a hit in North America and the Caribbean, gaining Daddy Yankee popularity among Latino mainstream music fans. On July 4, 2005, "Gasolina" was released as a single in the UK, eventually earning a Silver certification in March 2019. Australia saw the single enter their charts in late January 2006 during their summer season, rising to number 12. Enjoying worldwide success, "Gasolina" is one of the songs attributed with opening the door for reggaeton and creating a pathway for other stars in the genre.

== Charts ==
=== Weekly charts ===
Chart (2004–2006)	Peak position
Australia (ARIA)	12
Austria (Ö3 Austria Top 40)	9
Belgium (Ultratop 50 Flanders)	13
Belgium (Ultratop 50 Wallonia)	11
Colombia Airplay (Los 40)	13
Czech Republic (IFPI)	9
Denmark (Tracklisten)	2
Europe (Eurochart Hot 100)	8
France (SNEP)	12
Germany (GfK)	7
Greece (IFPI)	2
Ireland (IRMA)	5
Italy (FIMI)	2
Netherlands (Dutch Top 40)	29
Netherlands (Single Top 100)	16
Mexico Tropical (Monitor Latino)	1
Norway (VG-lista)	4
Scottish Singles Sales (Official Charts)	8
Sweden (Sverigetopplistan)	44
Switzerland (Schweizer Hitparade)	5
UK Singles (Official Charts)	5
UK Hip Hop/R&B (Official Charts)	3
US Billboard Hot 100	32
US Hot Latin Songs (Billboard)	17
US Hot R&B/Hip-Hop Songs (Billboard)	37
US Hot Rap Songs (Billboard)	10
US Rhythmic Airplay (Billboard)	11
Venezuela (Record Report)	1

Chart (2010)	Peak Position
US Latin Digital Songs (Billboard)	18

Chart (2013)	Peak Position
US Latin Streaming Songs (Billboard)	17

Chart (2017)	Peak Position
US Latin Digital Songs (Billboard)	9

Chart (2026)	Peak Position
Greece International (IFPI)	64

=== Year-end charts ===
Chart (2005)	Position
Austria (Ö3 Austria Top 40)	52
Brazil (Crowley)	65
CIS (Tophit)	68
Europe (Eurochart Hot 100)	58
Germany (Media Control GfK)	44
Italy (FIMI)	24
Netherlands (Single Top 100)	86
Russia Airplay (TopHit)	54
Switzerland (Schweizer Hitparade)	15
UK Singles (OCC)	94
UK Urban (Music Week)	33
Venezuela (Record Report)	6

Chart (2006)	Position
Australia (ARIA)	60

== Sales and certifications ==
Region	Certification	Certified units/sales
Denmark (IFPI Danmark)	Gold	45,000^{‡}
Germany (BVMI)	Platinum	600,000^{‡}
Italy 2005 sales	—	11,000
Italy (FIMI) sales + streams since 2009	Platinum	100,000^{‡}
Japan	—	100,000
New Zealand (RMNZ)	2× Platinum	60,000^{‡}
Spain (Promusicae) sales + streams since 2015	2× Platinum	120,000^{‡}
United Kingdom (BPI)	Platinum	600,000^{‡}
United States (RIAA)	33× Platinum (Latin)	1,980,000^{‡}
Streaming
Greece (IFPI Greece)	Platinum	2,000,000^{†}
^{‡} Sales+streaming figures based on certification alone.^{†} Streaming-only figures based on certification alone.

== Release history ==
Region	Date	Format	Label	Ref.
United States	October 2004	Radio	VI Music	
Australia	January 16, 2006	CD	Universal Music Australia	

== Uses in the media and live performances ==
- During his performance at the 2005 Lo Nuestro Awards, Daddy Yankee came into the show in a red Lamborghini, which was pulled down from the roof of American Airlines Arena in Miami, while singing "Gasolina". This moment was voted as the best moment of the show by online voters at Univision's website.
- The song was used in a TV advertising for the 2006 Citroën C2, which ran through the spring and summer of 2005.
- At a campaign stop for Republican presidential nominee John McCain, Daddy Yankee endorsed McCain and performed this song live for students at Phoenix's Central High. A New York Times blogger has questioned if McCain and his campaign understood the song's double-entendres.
- Performer Bad Bunny sampled the song during the Super Bowl LX halftime show as an intro to Eoo.

== Papa A.P. version ==
"Gasolina"

Single by Papa A.P.

from the album Assesina
- B-side: "La Noche"
- Released: April 25, 2005
- Genre: Reggaeton
- Length: 3:15
- Label: EMI
- Songwriters: Ramón Ayala; Eddie Ávila
- Producer: Monello

Papa A.P. singles chronology
"Gasolina" (2005)	"Entre tu y yo (Entre toi et moi)" (2005)

Salvadoran singer Papa A.P. released a cover version of "Gasolina" in Europe in 2005. It caused some controversy for being released there prior to Daddy Yankee's version, which had been released the previous year in the United States. It was the first single from his second studio album, Assesina.

Papa A.P. said that he initially refused to release the single before Daddy Yankee but was convinced to do so by his producers. He said about his version: "I do not regret that choice because even if it's not my title, everyone has very well accepted my version, even in the hood of New York". He claims his producers "came to an arrangement" with Daddy Yankee's producers. One week after the recording, his producer proposed shooting a music video, which was eventually shot in Tunisia.

His first European hit, the song reached the top 10 in France, and also charted elsewhere around Europe.

=== Track listings ===
CD single

1. "Gasolina" (radio mix) – 3:13
2. "Gasolina" (bikes club mix) – 4:45
3. "La noche" – 3:30

CD maxi

1. "Gasolina" (radio dy bikes) – 3:15
2. "Gasolina" (club dy bikes) – 4:46
3. "La noche" – 3:30
4. "Gasolina" (video)

CD maxi – Finland

1. "Gasolina" (radio mix bikes) – 3:14
2. "Gasolina" (club mix bikes) – 4:45

12-inch maxi

1. "Gasolina" – 3:13
2. "Gasolina" (club mix) – 4:44
3. "Gasolina" (bikes club mix) – 4:45
4. "La Noche" – 3:30

=== Certifications ===
Region	Certification	Certified units/sales
France (SNEP)	Silver	100,000^{*}
^{*} Sales figures based on certification alone.

=== Charts ===
Chart (2005)	Peak position
Austrian Singles Chart	65
Belgian (Wallonia) Singles Chart	10
French SNEP Singles Chart	8
Germany (GfK)	46
Spanish Singles Chart	18
Swiss Singles Chart	14

End of year chart (2005)	Position
Belgian (Wallonia) Singles Chart	49
French Singles Chart	49

== Other cover versions and remixes ==
- The song was remixed in late 2004 by DJ Buddha, featuring Pitbull and N.O.R.E., and was also a smash hit. Later, Lil Jon mixed his own vocals to the remix, which is featured on the bonus remix disc of Crunk Juice.
- This song was also recorded by La Fabrica and released in Europe before the song's official release by Daddy Yankee. La Fabrica's version peaked at number three in Greece before the original "Gasolina" was released.
- The song was covered by Australian alternative metal/metalcore quintet Future Static in 2023. The metal cover unites the vastly different metal and reggaeton worlds of singer Amariah Cook's Barcelona upbringing in the L'Hospitalet de Llobregat district, home to a large number of people of Latin American descent, immersed in the reggaeton musical culture.
