= Billboard Latin rhythm charts =

The Billboard Latin rhythm charts began in 2005 when an album chart were introduced as Latin Rhythm Albums in the May 21 issue of the magazine. Three months later, Billboard then established Latin Rhythm Airplay, which initially rank the most-played songs played on Latin rhythm radio stations before switching to an audience-based methodology in January 2011. As the music and radio industries, as well as the technology to monitor and measure sales and airplay, have evolved, Billboard currently publishes three different Latin rhythm charts. On April 8, 2025, Billboard debuted the Hot Latin Rhythm Songs chart, which ranks the best-performing Latin rhythm songs across streaming, digital, and airplay from all radio stations in the United States.

By "Latin rhythm", Billboard generally refers to the genre as Spanish-speaking urbano music, including reggaeton and Latin hip hop/trap.

== History ==
=== Latin Rhythm Albums ===
The Latin Rhythm Albums chart was established on the issue dated May 21, 2005. Initially, its sales compiled by Nielsen SoundScan, basing it on electronic point of sale data. On January 26, 2017, Billboard updated the Latin Rhythm Albums, along with the other genre album charts, to incorporate track equivalent albums (TEA) and streaming equivalent albums (SEA) to match the current Billboard 200 methodology.

The first number-one album on the Latin Rhythm Albums chart was Barrio Fino by Daddy Yankee. According to Geoff Mayfield, the goal of the chart was not to be a reggaeton-only chart, despite the inaugural listing having all fifteen slots taken up by reggaeton titles.

=== Latin Rhythm Airplay ===
The Latin Rhythm Airplay was established on August 13, 2005, and came about as a result of radio stations tapping into the growing second and third generation Hispanic audience who wanted a Spanish-speaking or bilingual alternative to the (English-language mainstream, rhythmic, and R&B/hip-hop) formats that they felt would represent them. With the issue dated January 8, 2011, the chart's methodology was change to reflect overall airplay of Latin rhythm music on Latin radio stations. Instead of ranking songs being played on Latin-rhythm stations, rankings are determined by the amount of airplay Latin rhythm songs receive on stations that play Latin music regardless of genre.

The first number-one song on the Latin Rhythm Airplay chart was "Lo Que Pasó, Pasó" by Daddy Yankee.

=== Hot Latin Rhythm Songs ===
On the issue dated April 12, 2025, Billboard established Hot Latin Rhythm Songs which ranks the best-performing Latin rhythm songs which follows the methodology of the Billboard Hot 100 by incorporating digital download sales, streaming data, and radio airplay of Latin rhythm songs over all formats. The first number-one song on the Hot Latin Rhythm Songs chart was "DTMF" by Bad Bunny.
