= Code: Pandorum =

German musician

- Also known as: INHUMAN, Static:Reset
- Born: Sven Selka; 23 February 1996 (age 30); Anrochte, North Rhine-Westphalia, Germany
- Origin: Soest, North Rhine-Westphalia, Germany
- Genres: Deathstep; Dubstep; heavy metal; classical music
- Years active: 2011–present
- Labels: Buygore; Crowsnest Audio; Kannibalen; Subsidia, PRIME Audio

Sven Selka (born 23 February 1996), professionally known as Code: Pandorum, formerly INHUMAN and Static:Reset, is a German electronic music producer. Selka is the co-founder of Crowsnest Audio. He is credited with being one of the pioneers of "deathstep" music and the incorporation of orchestral music into dubstep.

== Early life ==
Selka first began music production in 5th grade, when a friend introduced him to FL Studio, and first began electronic music and heavy metal music, but when he discovered dubstep when he was 14, he started to take influence from the style. He was inspired by artists such as Borgore, Bratkilla, Mantis, and Sadhu.

== Music career ==
Selka began producing in the early deathstep music scene under the name Static:Reset. His first official release was in 2013; an EP titled Profanity. Then, in 2014, he changed his name to Code: Pandorum with the release of the Tears of Kali EP. In 2016, he released his debut album, GOD LP, and a later reissue called God's Army.

In 2021, he changed his name from Code: Pandorum to INHUMAN with the release of the single, "Rapture". In 2024, he reverted his name to Code: Pandorum.

Selka is also the founder and CEO of independent label Crowsnest Audio, which he co-founded with Lord Swan3x and TenGraphs. Crowsnest Audio was founded in 2016 in Germany.

== Musical style ==
While his music is typically referred to as "deathstep" and he is affiliated with the genre's music circle, Selka has stated he would not describe his music as "deathstep" due to the prevalence of melodic dubstep throughout his music, and has transitioned into more melodic dubstep after changing from Code: Pandorum to INHUMAN. His musical style is described as dark dubstep with orchestral elements, such as sampling of church choir and classical music to create pre-bass drop tension. He has stated that his music is akin to a horror film, and his music stages resemble plot stages: he creates a dark atmosphere (exposition); the bass drop approaches, (building tension); and then the bass drop initiates (climax).

== Influence ==
Selka has been a large influence on dubstep music and inspired deathstep artists such as TenGraphs, Lord Swan3x, and FaceSplit. In the early 2010s, deathstep's origin, it was an underground dubstep subgenre, but Selka popularised deathstep styles into mainstream with his albums.

== Naming ==
From 2014 to 2021, Selka's alias was Code: Pandorum, a name inspired by the film of the same name, the colon stylisation originated from Selka's 2013–2014 alias Static:Reset (on advice from fellow musician Bratkilla). There is no known meaning for the names Static:Reset or INHUMAN. In 2024, Selka reverted his name to Code: Pandorum.

== Discography ==
Code: Pandorum discography
- Studio albums: 3
- EPs: 10
- Compilation albums: 4
- Singles: 20
- Music videos: 6
- LPs: 1
- Remixes: 25

Selka has produced a total of 8 albums, 10 EPs, 20 singles, 6 music videos, and 25 remixes.

=== EPs ===
==== Released as Static:Reset ====
- Profanity (2013)
- Warriors (2013)

==== Released as Code: Pandorum ====
- 1K Likes (2014)
- Tears of Kali (2014)
- The Order (2014)
- The Order (Remixes) (2015)
- 14K (2015)
- Lunatic (2015)
- Chosen (2016)
- The Lost Files (2016)
- Inquisition (2016)
- Outclass (2018)
- Deathsquad (Remixes) (with Autodrive & Qoiet) (2019)
- Penumbra (2019)
- Road to AOTD (2020)
- Brotherhood (2020)
- Nightmare Fuel (2025)
- Mimic the Earth (with Qoiet) (2025)

==== Released as Inhuman ====
- Damnation_Tapes, Vol 1 (2022)
- Collision I (2022)
- Black_Mass (2022)
- Pandorum (2023)

=== Studio albums ===
==== Released as Code: Pandorum ====
- God (2016)
- God's Army (2016)
- The Lovecraftian Horrors (2017)
- Videodrome (2018)
- Art Of The Devil (2020)
- La Fin Absolue Du Monde (2024)
- Tales from the Blight (2026)

==== Released as Inhuman ====
- Arrival (2023)
- Re: Arrival (2024)

=== Compilation albums ===
All compilation albums are released under the name Code: Pandorum, on behalf the Crowsnest Audio record label (owned and founded by Code: Pandorum).

- Kill List (2016)
- Crowsnest Elite #1 (2017)
- Leviathan Ch. 1 (2019)
- Crowsnest Elite #2 (2019)
- Leviathan Ch. 2 (2020)
- Crowsnest Elite #3 (2020)
- Crowsnest Elite #4 (2021)

=== Singles ===
==== Released as Code: Pandorum ====
- "Reborn" (2014)
- "Deadline" (2014) (420|002)
- "Anxious" (2014) (Assassins Vol. 1)
- "Lucid Dream" (2014) (Genesis)
- "T-Rex" (with Warthog) (2014) (Mixture Volume 2)
- "Empire Of The Dead" (with Atomize) (2014) (Heavyweight)
- "Desjardin" (2014)
- "Martyrium" (with Riot Ten) (2014)
- "Crimson Peak" (with HaXim) (2015)
- "Captain Spaulding" (2015) (Prime Audio 6K Likes)
- "Extinction" (2015) (Mixture Volume 3)
- "Witchcraft" (with Mits) (2015)
- "Shibito" (2015)
- "Peoples Temple" (2015) (Return Of The Future)
- "Chosen" (2016) (God)
- "Lazarus" (2016)
- "Jason" (2016)
- "Khaimera" (2016) (Kill List Chapter 2)
- "Syndrome" (with Nasko) (2016) (Monxx 10K Followers)
- "Abduction" (with Rix Cena) (2016)
- "Senua" (2017) (Crownest Elite #1)
- "Bloodshock" (2017) (Savage Selects Vol. 2)
- "Pity" (with Oolacile) (2017)
- "FVCK RIDDIM" (with Mvrda) (2017)
- "Krampus Returns" (2017)
- "The Neon Demon" (2017)
- "Radiant" (2017)
- "Punish" (2018) (Fresh Blood Vol. 4)
- "Polaroid" (2018) (Prime 100)
- "Multitude" (2018) (Stay Rad Vol. 1)
- "Snuff Pt. 2" (2018) (Syndicate Vol. 2)
- "Run It" (2018)
- "Crusader" (2018) (Without God: Season Four)
- "Monxxed" (2019) (Crownest Elite #2)
- "The Devils" (2019)
- "Divebomb" (with Brain Palace) (2019) (Syndicate Vol. 3)
- "Panik" (with FaceSplit) (2019) (Knights Of The Round Table Vol. 3)
- "Sweet Dreams" (featuring SnoWhite) (2019)
- "Art Of The Devil" (2020) (Art Of The Devil)
- "Purpose" (2020) (Art Of The Devil)
- "Fade To Black" (featuring Vulgatron) (2020) (Art Of The Devil)
- "Streets Of Rage" (featuring Kid Bookie) (2020) (Art Of The Devil)
- "Eclipse" (featuring SnoWhite) (2020) (Art Of The Devil)
- "Sadako" (2020) (Subsidia Night Vol. 1)
- "Nigeru" (2020) (Syndicate Vol. 4)
- "Event Horizon" (2020)
- "Overlord" (with AXEN) (2020) (Crownest Elite #3)
- "Everyone's the Same" (with Qoiet) (2020) (Crownest Elite #3)
- "Burn" (with Mantis) (2020) (Fresh Blood: Royal Blood)
- "Colossus" (with FaceSplit and Adrift) (2020) (Subsidia Dusk Vol. 2)
- "The Executioner" (featuring Vulgatron) (2021)
- "Death Funk" (with Qoiet) (2024)
- "Estrondo da Morte" (with Qoiet) (2024)
- "Stack That" (with Virus Syndicate) (2024) (Bad Medic vs Crownest)
- "Violence" (featuring Original God) (2024) (Torture Torn II)
- "Nihilist" (featuring Sinizter) (2024) (La Fin Absolue Du Monde)
- "Cement Garden" (2024) (La Fin Absolue Du Monde)
- "Body of Decay" (with Ibex) (2024) (La Fin Absolue Du Monde)
- "Tulpa" (with Dealer Of Happiness featuring flowanastasia) (2024) (La Fin Absolue Du Monde)
- "Klaubauf" (2024) (La Fin Absolue Du Monde)
- "Broken Mirror" (with MARTVR) (2024) (La Fin Absolue Du Monde)
- "Last Rite (Looking Glass)" (2025)
- "Paint It Red" (with Qoiet and Snails) (2025)
- "28 Years" (2025)
- "Mimic the Earth" (with Qoiet) (2025) (Mimic the Earth)
- "Zealot" (2025)
- "Rotten Soil" (2025) (Crownest Elite VI)
- "A King's Decapitation" (2026) (Tales from the Blight)
- "The Burden" (2026) (with MIRAR) (Tales from the Blight)
- "Write Beneath" (2026) (with Sinizter and Demien Sixx) (Devil in the Flesh)
- "Wellsworn" (2026) (Tales from the Blight)
- "Theriac" (2026) (with Signs of the Swarm) (Tales from the Blight)
- "Bleeding Dahlia" (2026) (Tales from the Blight)
- "The Sun's Domain" (2026) (with Sunborn) (Tales from the Blight)

==== Released as Inhuman ====
- "Rapture" (with Omas featuring Les Gold, and SnoWhite) (2021) (Subsidia Dusk Vol. 4)
- "Vagabond" (2021)
- "Quicksand" (featuring The Anix) (2021)
- "Cycles" (with Caster) (2021) (Crownest Elite #4)
- "War" (featuring The Well Runs Red) (2022) (Collision I)
- "Bow_Down" (with Qoiet) (2022) (Collision I)
- "Deathlist" (featuring Ghostkid) (2022) (Collision I)
- "Vengeance" (with Hungry Lights) (2022) (Collision I)
- "Body_Harvest" (2022)
- "Sentinel" (2022)
- "Possesor" (with Disinety) (2023) (Torture Torn)
- "Augmented" (2023) (Arrival)
- "New_World" (featuring Wasiu) (2023) (Arrival)
- "Eternity" (2023) (Arrival)
- "Prison" (featuring Spydr FÆ) (2023) (Arrival)
- "Cutscene" (with Qoiet) (2023) (Arrival)
- "Antimatter" (2023) (Arrival)
- "Somerset" (with Orphan Planet) (2023) (Arrival)
- "Haven" (with Earhead) (2023) (Kannibals at the Beach Vol. 2)
- "Eldritch" (with Muerte) (2023) (Crowsnest Elite V)
- "Prophet" (2023) (Pandorum)
- "Halfblood" (2023) (Pandorum)
- "Scarlet" (2023) (Pandorum)

=== Remixes ===
==== Released as Code: Pandorum ====
- Kram & Static:Reset - "Polymorph" (Code: Pandorum Remix) (2014)
- Acting Damage - "Bathsheba" (Code: Pandorum Remix) (2014) (Bathsheba EP)
- Xenixa - "Suicidal Honor" (Code: Pandorum Remix) (2014) (Relentless EP)
- FuntCase - "50 Caliber" (Code: Pandorum Remix) (2014)
- Midnight Tyrannosaurus - "Basement Bitches" (Code: Pandorum Remix) (2014) (Remix Bitches)
- JPhelpz - "Biggup King" (Code: Pandorum Remix) (2014) (Biggup King Remixes)
- Kretan - "Godless" (Code: Pandorum Remix) (2014)
- Midnight Tyrannosaurus - "The Demon" (Code: Pandorum Remix) (2014)
- Acting Damage - "Monster" (Code: Pandorum Remix) (2014) (The Order EP)
- FaceSplit - "Marv" (Code: Pandorum Remix) (2014) (ANGST Free EP)
- Borgore & Sikdope - "Space Kitten Invasion" (Code: Pandorum Remix) (2014)
- Spag Heddy - "Whuck!" (Code: Pandorum Remix) (2014)
- Borgore - "Guided Relaxation Dub" (Code: Pandorum Remix) (2014)
- Lord Swan3x - "M16" (Code: Pandorum Remix) (2015) (The Armory)
- Lord Swan3x - "Deathwish" (Code: Pandorum Remix) (2015)
- Whales - "Sincerity" (featuring Ranja) (Code: Pandorum Remix) (2015)
- Midnight Tyrannosaurus - "The Man With The Strange Ring" (Code: Pandorum Remix) (2015) (Midnight Snacks Vol. 1 Remixes)
- Evilwave & Qoiet - "Atheist" (FaceSplit & Code: Pandorum Remix) (2016) (Atheist EP)
- Code: Pandorum - "Chosen" (VIP) (2019) (Chosen)
- Borgore - "#NEWGOREORDER" (featuring Malcolm McDowell) (Code: Pandorum Remix) (2016)
- Mvrda - "Gunned Down" (Code: Pandorum Remix) (2016) (Gunned Down Remixed)
- Katy Perry - "Dark Horse" (featuring Juicy J) (Code: Pandorum Remix) (2016) (The Lost Files)
- Borgore & Sikdope - "Unicorn Zombie Apocalypse" (Code: Pandorum Remix) (2016) (The Lost Files)
- Figure - "Suspiria" (Code: Pandorum Remix) (2017) (Monsters 7 Remixes)
- Yookie - "Escape" (Code: Pandorum Remix) (2017)
- Kendrick Lamar - "HUMBLE." (Code: Pandorum & Mits Remix) (2017)
- Flux Pavilion - "Pull The Trigger" (featuring Cammie Robinson) (Code: Pandorum Remix) (2017)
- Riot Ten - "Rail Breaker" (featuring Rico Act) (Code: Pandorum Remix) (2017) (Rail Breaker Remixes)
- The Prodigy - "Timebomb Zone" (Code: Pandorum Remix) (2018)
- Downlink - "Mosh Pit" (Code: Pandorum & MVRDA Remix) (2018)
- Apashe - "Lacrimosa" (Code: Pandorum, TenGraphs & Qoiet Remix) (2018) (Requiem Remix EP)
- London Nebel - "Crowls" (Code: Pandorum Remix) (2019) (Crowls EP)
- Code: Pandorum, Autodrive & Qoiet - "Deathsquad" (Code: Pandorum VIP) (2019) (Deathsquad Remixes)
- Squnto & Lord Swan3x - "Impressive" (Code: Pandorum Remix) (2019)
- Acting Damage - "Reign Of The Beasts" (Code: Pandorum Remix) (2019)
- SampliFire - "Travis" (Code: Pandorum Remix) (2019)
- Ritual Of Ether - "Left for Dead" (Code: Pandorum Remix) (2019)
- Virus Syndicate, Virtual Riot & Dion Timmer - "Gang Shit" (Code: Pandorum & Brain Palace Remix) (2019)
- Excision, Downlink & Space Laces - "Raise Your Fist" (Code: Pandorum Remix) (2019)
- ATLiens & Eddie - "Closer" (Code: Pandorum Remix) (2019) (Ghost Planet Remixes)
- Svdden Death - "Brainstorm" (Code: Pandorum Remix) (2019)
- PhaseOne - "We Are The Free" (featuring Thy Art Is Murder) (Code: Pandorum Remix) (2020) (Transcendency Remixes)
- Modestep - "Blood" (Code: Pandorum Remix) (2020) (The Remixes)
- Zardonic - "Revelation" (Code: Pandorum & Sadhu Remix) (2020) (The Become Remix Album)
- Bring Me the Horizon - "Parasite Eve" (Code: Pandorum & Caster Remix) (2020)
- Tenside - "Come Alive Dying" (Code: Pandorum Remix) (2024)
- Horror Dance Squad - "Taste The Doom" (Zardonic & Code: Pandorum Remix) (2024)
- Inhuman - "Prison" (featuring Spydr FÆ) (Code: Pandorum Remix) (2024) (Re: Arrival)
- Marshmello x Svdden Death - "Ceremony" (Code: Pandorum Remix) (2024)
- Must Die! - "Chaos" (Code: Pandorum & Crimson Scar Remix) (2025)
- Eptic & Space Laces - "Crash Out" (Code: Pandorum Remix) (2025)
- YMIR - "The Wild Hunt" (Code: Pandorum Remix) (2025) (The Fae Remixes)
- Distant - "(Un)Dying" (Code: Pandorum Remix) (2025)
- Svdden Death - "Thirst For Revenge" (Code: Pandorum Remix) (2025) (VOYD 2.5, Pt. III)
- Pythius - "In My Head" (featuring REEBZ) (Code: Pandorum Remix) (2026) (Turmoil Remixed, Pt. 3)

==== Released as Inhuman ====
- Apashe - "Good News" (Inhuman Remix) (2021) (Renaissance Remixes)
- Ghostkid - "FØØL" (Inhuman Remix) (2021)
- Krischvn - "Nova" (Inhuman Remix) (2022) (Nova)
- Kayzo - "The Sickness" (featuring Ghostkid) (Inhuman Remix) (2023) (New Breed Remixes)
- Kuadra - "SANTINO" (Zardonic & Inhuman Remix) (2023)
- Illenium - "Shivering" (featuring Spiritbox) (Inhuman Remix) (2023) (Illenium Remixes)

=== Music videos ===
All music videos have been released under the Code:Pandorum name.

- "Art of the Devil" (2020)
- "Purpose" (2020)
- "Fade to Black" (featuring Vulgatron) (2020)
- "Streets Of Rage" (featuring Kid Bookie) (2020)
- "Eclipse" (featuring SnoWhite) (2020)
- "Existence" (2020)
- "The Executioner" (featuring Vulgatron) (2021)
- "Nihilist" (featuring Sinizter) (2024)
- "Cement Garden" (2024)
- "Body of Decay" (with Ibex) (2024)
- "Tulpa" (with Dealer Of Happiness featuring flowanastasia) (2024)
- "Klaubauf" (2024)
- "Broken Mirror" (with Martvr) (2024)
