= SKisM =

British DJ, electronic music producer, and record label executive

- Official logo until 2021

Background information
- Also known as: Dash
- Born: Thomas Stephen Petais; 14 January 1982 (age 44)
- Origin: London, England, United Kingdom
- Genres: Breakbeat; Dubstep; Drumstep; Moombahcore; Bass music
- Occupations: DJ; Producer; Record Label Executive
- Instruments: Digital Audio Workstation (DAW); DJ Controller
- Years active: Mid 2000s–2021
- Labels: 720Bass (Hardcore Beats and Wicky Lindows); Never Say Die
- Formerly of: Ctrl-Z
- Website: skism.co.uk (Archived December 21, 2021)

Thomas Stephen Petais (born January 14, 1982), bka SKisM, is a retired English DJ, electronic music producer, and record label executive. Petais is the co-founder of two independent Electronic music record labels: Disciple Records and Never Say Die Records. Petais is nicknamed, by those who've professionally worked with and interviewed him, as the "DJ's DJ" because of the "technical prowess and energy on his multi deck setup" during his performances.

== Career ==
=== Etymology ===
The etymology of Petais' alias derives from the English word schism, which simply means to split or divide. Petais noted that the etymology behind the name didn't involve anything religious, "satantic or anything like that".

=== Musical style ===
Petais' tracks incorporate, according to the Ravalli Republic and Beat Magazine, a "syncopating rhythm", "bass and drum elements", "classical progressions, metal influences, ethnic samples, and break beats". Petais also draws influences from both heavy metal music and drum and bass while growing up and from breakbeat during his music school years and his years being part of Ctrl-Z.

=== Ctrl-Z as 'Dash' (Mid 2000s–2009) ===
Petais attended, and is an alumnus of, Community Music: a music school located in the East London neighborhood. Petais met Nicholas D'Silva (aka Night Shift and Pyramid), a classmate in Community Music's Creative Music Production & Business program, and both formed Ctrl-Z: a breakbeat music duo. Petais was also known as Dash and D'Silva was also known as Inch. In 2005, the duo was selected as winners for "Best Breakthrough Act" and "Best Breakthrough Producer" at the Breakspoll Awards: an award ceremony and music festival for artists and record labels that produce breakbeat tracks. In 2006, the duo received "Best Compilation Album" for their contributions to a compilation commissioned by Hardcore Beats (the label the group was signed to) called Hardwired.

=== SKisM (2009–2021) ===
In September 2009, SKisM released his first, 2-song Extended Play (EP) titled Rise Of The Idiots / Back Off. Back Off was remarked as "dirty roughened gully funk... guaranteed to sooth the soul during frustrating, testing times" while Rise Of The Idiots was remarked having "added weight an irony" than the former.

On July 17, 2009, Never Say Die Records was founded along with Nicholas Sadler (aka Mobscene). SKisM did so because he "wanted to continue making bass music and working in the industry" due to the decline of the breakbeat scene. The very first track to be released on the label was a single titled "Ruffneck '09" by Ctrl-Z and the Freestylers with vocals from reggae artist Navigator on December 7, 2009. Ctrl-Z then released a remix of Cracks (by the Freestylers) on Never Say Die eight months later.

Down With The Kids EP Album Cover (2010)

On December 6, 2010, SKisM released his second, 5-song EP titled Down With The Kids. The EP included 3 original tracks: Power, Elixir, and Rave Review and two remixes, made by FuntCase and Matta, from his first EP. Elixir was remarked for "spawn[ing] a whole range of fugly remixes". A VIP Mix was later released on 2013. Rave Review, on the other hand, was made in response and reaction to the radio playing "recycled samples and ideas coming through" and jumping all over the "future jungle type music" at a time where dubstep was starting to became popular. The song used a sample from Henry Rollins.

In 2011, SKisM collaborated with Flux Pavilion, with featuring vocals from the Foreign Beggars, to release Jump Back. The single was remarked for being "a dark, hard-hitting track" consisting of "grimy vocals" and "Flux [Pavilion]'s signature sounds".

The Division EP Album Cover (2012)

In 2012, SKisM released a 9-song EP titled The Division. The EP included 5 remixes and four original mix songs that each had a "variety of different genres and rhythms". In other words, deviating from producing what SKisM is typically known for: dubstep, Experts had a music video that depicted himself, Excision, Eptic, Skrillex, Zomboy each "battling [one-on-one] an empowered internet troll" on YouTube that often gives "so much stick online... asking where the... music is". The song used a sample recited by Phil Anselmo from heavy metal band Pantera. Kick It (with Zomboy) was made "with giddy disco samples, bird calls, and Alvin and the Chipmunks' vocal chops". At the same year, Petais' single: Like This, with featured vocals from Virus Syndicate, reached and maintained the #1 spot on Beatport's Top 100 Tracks list for one month.

In 2014, SKisM released a remix of Lazerbeam by ShockOne featuring Metrik and Kyza. The track is one of the few "record[s] outside of his predominant genre[s]" which refers to the track being a combination of both Moombahcore and Breakbeat influences.

In 2015, SKisM, Habstrakt, and Megalodon collaborated to release Jaguar. The single was initially started by both SKisM and Megalodon two years ago, but Habstrakt was brought into the project to complete the track into its final product. The track was remarked for "its ability to swarm with a kind of barely restrained violence that broods and busts through with an untouchable gangsta lean".

Since 2015, Petais has retired from producing music to focus his efforts on running the label such as "hav[ing] responsibilities for other people" and "executively produc[ing] for the artists' tracks". On October 5, 2021, Petais officially retired as a DJ and producer via a dissolution in its recent filing with the UK's Companies House.

== Personal life ==
Petais currently resides in Australia with his wife and two children.

== Discography ==
This is an incomplete list of the artist's discography. You can help complete this list by adding missing items with reliable sources.

SKisM discography
- EPs: 3
- Singles: 9
- Music videos: 1

=== EPs ===
Title	Tracklist	Details
Rise Of The Idiots / Back Off	1. Rise Of The Idiots; 2. Back Off	Released: September 2009; Label: Wicky Lindows (via 720Bass); Format: Digital download
Down With The Kids	1. Rave Review; 2. Elixir; 3. Power; 4. Rise Of The Idiots (FuntCase Remix); 5. Back Off (Matta Remix)	Released: December 6, 2010; Label: Never Say Die; Format: Digital download
The Division	1. Killer (with DC Breaks featuring Dee Freer); 2. Red Heat; 3. Experts; 4. Kick It (with Zomboy); 5. Killer (Tantrum Desire Remix); 6. Killer (CRUSH Remix); 7. Red Heat (TC Remix); 8. Experts (xKore Remix); 9. Kick It (Dirtyloud Remix)	Released: 2012; Label: Never Say Die; Format: Digital download

=== Singles & Collaborations ===
Year	Title	Label
2009	The Blank	Wicky Lindows (via 720Bass)
2011	Signs (with Tali & Do The Math)	Reign Recordings
2011	sEXisM (with Excision)	Mau5trap
2011	Jump Back (with Flux Pavilion) (feat. Foreign Beggars)	Circus Records
2012	Like This (feat. Virus Syndicate)	Never Say Die Records
2013	Elixir - VIP	Never Say Die Records
2015	Hostile (with Laxx)	Never Say Die Records
2015	Jaguar (with Habstrakt and Megalodon)	Never Say Die Records
2015	Black Hole (with Trampa)	Never Say Die Records

=== Remixes ===
Date	Original Artist	Title	Label
2010	Envy	Normal	stopstart records
2010	Excision & Datsik	Boom	Rottun Recordings
2010	Pyramid (feat. Juile Thompson)	Cruel	Funkatech Records
2010	Foreign Beggars	Get a Bit More	Dented Records
2011	RackNRuin	Dazed & Confused	Black Butter Records
2011	Porter Robinson	The State	Owsla
2011	Excision & Downlink	Heavy Artillery	S.T. Holdings Ltd.
2012	Muffler	Calling Your Name	SubHuman
2012	Hadouken!	Parasite (with Zomboy)	Ministry of Sound
2012	Far Too Loud	600 Years	Funkatech Records
2013	ShockOne (feat. Metrik & Kyza)	Lazerbeam	Viper Recordings
2014	Zomboy	Raptor (with Laxx)	Never Say Die

== See also ==
- List of dubstep musicians
- Never Say Die Records
