= Svdden Death =

American DJ and producer

- Born: Daniel James Howland; June 29, 1993 (age 33); San Jose, California, United States
- Genres: Riddim; dubstep
- Occupations: Disc jockey; record producer; composer
- Instrument: Digital audio workstation
- Years active: 2015–present
- Labels: Never Say Die; Insomniac; Bassrush; Buygore; Savage Society
- Website: svddendeath.com

Daniel James "Danny" Howland (born June 29, 1993), better known by his alias Svdden Death (stylized in all caps), is a Los Angeles DJ and producer from San Jose, California. He is known for his song "Sell Out", a collaboration with American multi-platinum artist Marshmello that peaked on Billboard's Hot Dance/Electronic Songs at the No. 36 position in early 2019. Howland makes high-energy music that falls into the genre of dubstep and riddim.

== Early life ==
Howland grew up in San Jose, listening to Kraftwerk before being introduced to dubstep in 2008, listening to such artists as Benga, Skream, and Rusko. He later moved to Los Angeles and began producing electro house, hip-hop, and big room house under a previous alias to work out his particular sound and style. He had experience playing in various metal, indie, and jazz bands, usually playing the guitar, bass, and piano.

== Career ==
=== 2017: "Prismatic" and Rott N' Roll Pt. 1: Remixed ===
On June 2, 2017, English record label Never Say Die Records released Howland's song "Prismatic" as a single for their seventh Black Friday extended play releases on their Black Label sub-label. Bianca Silva of Bassrush praised the song as "effortlessly destructive in the best way possible", marking it as a song fit for mosh pitting.

=== 2018: Junkworld EP, Voyd Vol. I, and SoundCloud ===
On February 2, 2018, Howland collaborated with San Francisco-based dubstep producer Somnium Sound to release the song "Angel Style" through the record label Buygore. Writing for T.H.E. - Music Essentials, Akshay Bhanawat described the song as a "sonic concoction" that was set to be an "instant classic in the world of dubstep" as well as the then-upcoming festival season, as the song had previously been played by various electronic music disk jockeys in their live-sets, including Dirtyphonics, Must Die!, Excision, 12th Planet, Slander, and Snails.

On February 16, Israeli electronic dance music producer and DJ Borgore collaborated with Howland to release the song "Svddengore" (a portmanteau of the two artists name) via Borgore's record label Buygore. Writing for EDM Sauce, Erik Mahal noted the song as being on the "edge of full-scale riddim" because of its various rhythmic elements as well as being a collaboration that many fans of either artist had "been dreaming about for years, and shockingly it easily lives up to the hype."

On February 26, Howland released his second extended play Junkworld via Never Say Die, featuring five songs on its tracklist. Your EDM's Matthew Meadow heavily praised the extended play, stating that it was "easily one of the strongest dubstep releases of the year so far", noting its "crazy inventive" sound design and arrangement and individually reviewing the song "Caught in a Mosh" as being "incredibly unique" in its arrangement and sounds. This Song Is Sick's Langston Thomas premiered the song "Surrender", a collaboration with riddim producer Subtronics, writing Howland had taken his sound design "to the next level" and that the style of each artist "mix perfectly" in the song.

On March 30, Dallas-based electronic music producer AFK collaborated with Howland to release the song "BZZRK" via the record label Bassrush. Bella Bagshaw of Dancing Astronaut described the song as a "screeching, chop-heavy riddim tune", in colouration to the "blast heat" vocal sample used in the song. A 5-track remix extended play for the song was later released on December 5.

On July 30, Howland self-released his third extended play Voyd Vol. I, featuring three solo tracks and two collaborations with fellow producers MVRDA and SampliFire. Jordan Mafi of Nest HQ stated that the extended play will stand as a benchmark of the dubstep sub-genre riddim, noting that the songs featured on it had been well-known dubplates that have previously only been heard by his collaborators as well as being prominently featured in his live-sets months before release.

On September 14, Quebec-based "vomitstep" producer Snails released a 10-track remix album of his album The Shell. The album featured Howland's remix of the song "Smack Up", featuring Foreign Beggars as vocals, alongside various other electronic dance music artists such as Virtual Riot, Kompany, Kill the Noise, and FuntCase.

In mid-November 2018, multiple bass music producers had most or all of their songs removed from online audio distribution platform and music sharing website SoundCloud for wrongful copyright claims. Among these producers were Howland, who had all of his tracks falsely copyright struck and removed from his account. Speaking in a statement to Your EDM, Howland spoke on the matter, stating that "SoundCloud is ruining the dubstep community by allowing anyone to claim a song as their own and remove it from existence. Until they fix their takedown policy, I will no longer be uploading songs to this platform."

On November 30, American electronic music producer and DJ Marshmello released part two of the remixes to his song "Happier", with Howland being featured as the second song on the extended play, alongside Jauz, West Coast Massive, Matt Medved, Hikeii, and Tim Gunther.

=== 2019: "Sell Out", "Ichor", and subsequent releases ===
On January 4, 2019, Howland collaborated with dubstep producers Oolacile and Ubur to release the song "Savceboys" as a free download. Bassrush's Chris Muniz called the riddim song "laser-focused and razor-sharp throughout each section" and sounds like it was not just designed to "showcase the vibe and sound of each producer but is determined to take listeners on a proper journey through the underbelly of this beast."

On February 8, Howland collaborated with Marshmello to release the riddim track "Sell Out" via the latter's record label Joytime Collective. The track was marked as Marshmello's first collaboration with a "serious" dubstep producer to make a dubstep track, with Svdden Death being known as having "some of the heaviest sets around right now" as described by a writer of Your EDM. Although the song did attract favourable reviews towards the song, such as Billboard's Kat Bein review of the song, Christina Hernandez of Dancing Astronaut gave the song a much more negative and critical review, describing its production as extremely "cookie-cutter" and that the song was simply "an easy cop-out to increase variety and maintain Marshmello’s hold over the EDM world at large."

On April 19, Howland self-released the song "Ichor" featuring American rapper Ace Savage as vocals. ThisSongSlaps' Brian Bonavoglia praised the song, stating that it served up "masterful production" and wrote that it sounded as if it was to simply "created to deliver devastating damage wherever it may make an appearance."

On June 7, American dubstep artist Space Laces released the remixes of his extended play Overdrive via Never Say Die, with Howland being featured as one of the remixers alongside various other electronic music producers such as Kompany and Gammer. Writing for EDM.com, Sarah Kocur reviewed Howland's remix of the song "Choppaz", noting it as one of the most distinctive on the extended play, writing that he gave the original song a "heavy twist for which he's known."

On August 2, Howland self-released the single "Modern Sorcery" as a digital download, with Brian Bonavoglia of ThisSongSlaps noting the song as a "coveted" within the bass music scene before its release and describing it as a "relentless chest-thumping anthem that was bred to destroy."

== Artistry ==
Howland had stated that Svdden Death was a desire to do "more advanced things with production", specifically choosing to produce dubstep as the genre is "much more technical than other genres" and gives him more freedom in his production. Originally using Ableton Live, he later switched to Reason to produce music and moving away from software synthesizers Serum and Massive to Reason's Malström as he wanted to move away from digital audio workstations and synthesizers that are commonly used by other dubstep and riddim producers.

Howland takes on a significantly darker, more metal-influenced style whenever he releases a Voyd project, leading some of his fans to see Voyd as a side-alias of Svdden Death. In an interview with Run the Trap, Howland clarified that "[Voyd is] more of a continuation of like a darker and heavier style of my music. With Svdden Death I want to branch out and do more melodic stuff. I still think Voyd is the kind of music I get into when I'm mad or really stressed."

Howland had been included in various "artists to watch" lists by several online electronic music magazines. Billboard Dance had listed Howland, alongside Elley Duhé, Detlef, Kittens, and Artbat, in their August 2018 edition of "Ones to Watch". Writers for Your EDM, Noiseporn, and EDM Sauce had included him in their respective "artists to watch in 2019" lists, placing him alongside such artists like 1788-L, Kompany, Blanke, Tynan, Fytch and Wildlyf.

== Discography ==
=== Albums and EPs ===
- Spelljam EP, June 12, 2017 (Never Say Die: Black Label) digital download
- Junkworld EP, February 26, 2018 (Never Say Die), digital download
- Voyd Vol. I, July 30, 2018 (Voyd Music), digital download
- Bzzrk Remixes (with AFK), December 5, 2018 (Bassrush), digital download
- Voyd Vol. 1.5, August 9, 2019 (Voyd Music), digital download
- Voyd Vol. II, March 18, 2022 (Voyd Music), digital download
- Harbinger, January 19, 2024 (Voyd Music), digital download
- Voyd Vol. 2.5, June 25, 2025 (Voyd Music/Create Music Group), digital download

==== As a featured artist ====
Title	Details
Buygore: Fresh Blood 2 by Various Artists	Released: May 12, 2017; Label: Buygore; Format: Digital download
Welcome to Heck by Ubur	Released: September 4, 2017; Label: Never Say Die: Black Label; Format: Digital download
Black Label XL 4 by Various Artists	Released: September 25, 2017; Label: Never Say Die: Black Label; Format: Digital download
Rott N' Roll Pt. 1: Remixed by Zomboy	Released: November 10, 2017; Label: Never Say Die; Format: Digital download
Never Say Die Vol. 5 by Various Artists	Released: December 11, 2017; Label: Never Say Die; Format: Digital download
The Shell (Remixes) by Snails	Released: September 14, 2018; Label: Slugz Music; Format: Digital download
Happier (Remixes Pt. 2) by Marshmello	Released: October 19, 2018; Label: Joytime Collective; Format: Digital download
Overdrive Remixes by Space Laces	Released: June 7, 2019; Label: Never Say Die; Format: Digital download

=== Charted singles ===
Title	Year	Peak chart positions	Album
Title	Year	US Dance	Album
"Sell Out" (with Marshmello)	2019	36	Non-album single

=== Other singles ===
Title	Year	Album	Label
"Regulate"	2015	Non-album singles	Bassweight
"Edgelords" (with Digitist)	2016	Non-album singles	Savage Society
"Oblivion"	2016	Non-album singles	Self-released
"Destiny"	2017	Non-album singles	Self-released
"Shut 'Em Down" (with Yakz)	2017	Non-album singles	Savage Society
"Prismatic"	2017	Black Friday Vol. 7	Never Say Die: Black Label
"Yokai"	2017	Syndicate Volume 1	Bassweight
"Take Ya Head Off"	2017	Non-album singles	Self-released
"Angel Style" (with Somnium Sound)	2018	Non-album singles	Buygore
"Svddengore" (with Borgore)	2018	Non-album singles	Buygore
"Bzzrk" (with AFK)	2018	Non-album singles	Bassrush
"Savceboys" (with Oolacile and Ubur)	2019	Non-album singles	Self-released
"Ichor" (featuring Ace Savage)	2019	Non-album singles	Self-released
"Modern Sorcery"	2019	Non-album singles	Self-released
"Crusade" (with Marshmello)	2020	Non-album singles	Joytime Collective
"Deathmatch" (with Snails)	2020	Non-album singles	Self-released
"Confusion Spell"	2020	Non-album singles	Self-released
"Blood On Me" (with Slander)	2020	Non-album singles	Gud Vibrations
"Utah"	2020	Halcyon Sound Vol. 1	Halcyon
"Shallow Land Burial" (Note: Originally released with the title SLB 2021.)	2021	VOYD Vol. II	Voyd Music
"Transmutation Sequence"	2021	Non-album single	Voyd Music
"Purgatory" (with ATLiens)	2022	Space Cathedral	Bassrush
"Born To Suffer"	2023	Non-album single	Voyd Music
"Pursuit of Violence" (with Sullivan King)	2023	Thrones of Blood	Monstercat
"Peanut Butter" (with Marauda)	2023	Non-album single	Malignant Music
"Harbinger"	2023	Harbinger	Voyd Music
"Don't You Dare Go Hollow" (with Hvdes)	2023	Harbinger	Voyd Music
"Mind Control" (with Wooli)	2023	Harbinger	Voyd Music
"Ten Toad Anthem"	2024	Harbinger	Voyd Music
"Forgive Forget"	2024	Harbinger	Voyd Music
"Ceremony" (with Marshmello)	2024	MELLODEATH Tapes Volume 1	Joytime Collective
"Triumphant" (with Marshmello)	2024	MELLODEATH Tapes Volume 1	Joytime Collective
"Tormento" (with Automhate)	2024	Non-album singles	Halcyon
"Midnight" (with Nimda, yvm3 and PeelingFlesh)	2025	Non-album singles	Voyd Music

=== Remixes ===
Title	Year	Album	Label
"Gunned Down"	2016	Mvrda	Prime Audio
"Biterz"	2017	Zomboy	Never Say Die
"Smack Up"	2018	Snails	Slugz Music
"Happier"	2018	Marshmello	Joytime Collective
"Choppaz"	2019	Space Laces & Getter	Never Say Die
"Losing It" (with Somnium Sound)	2019	Fisher	Self-released
