= FireFLY =

- Also known as: Jay & Seb, LifeIsGood
- Origin: Lausanne, Switzerland
- Genres: trap, Electronic, hip hop, Bass
- Occupations: Producer, DJ
- Years active: 2012–present
- Labels: MXX Music Empire, Ouroboros Records, Plenum Records, Rendez-vous Digital
- Website: lifeisgood.tv

FireFLY is a trap/bass duo (Jay & Seb) from Lausanne, Switzerland. The group was created in 2012 by hip-hop producer Jay Fase.

== History ==
In 2012, Jay started his own "producer/composer" career with his longtime music partner Seb (Maén). They created "FireFLY", a producer and DJ duo of Future/Trap/bass Music. In addition to FireFLY, Jay & Seb originate the "LifeIsGood" concept, working with the director and graphic designer Mark Angelil to find a visual identity.

Early 2014, FireFLY joined the Swiss DJ/VJ/Producers collective "Passe A La Trap", recently formed by Drin, Nazaire, HGT, PxPVisual and DJ Ozo (from Shadyvilledj's World Wide), then officiate as residents for the "Passe A La Trap" Nights at the Prestige Club (Globull, Bulle, Switzerland).

FireFLY's debut single "Maraboo" was released in September 2014 on LCD Records. Their follow-up single "Get Crunk" was released in October 2014 on Wup Records. They also have produced the club banger "Upside Down" for DJ Vincz Lee, featuring the Jamaican singers Popcaan and Cali P.

In 2014, they dropped the video-clip of their new EP "Walking (Original & Remixes), starring the SuicideGirls "Carrina Vargas", shot in California, US. The video clip was broadcast on Swiss music TV channels.

FireFLY returned in November 2015 with their EP "The Big Picture". The first single of the EP, "Homeboat" was released October 18, 2015 on Plenum Records, as well as a video clip of the second single "Dream" on November 9, 2015.

"LifeIsGood" is also a party concept which takes place at Globull Club with top charted guest stars.

After few remixes, several dates as DJ's around Switzerland, Germany and Thailand (Illuzion Club Phuket, ranked 93 on DJmag.com Top Clubs list in 2016) with their "Life Is Good" concept (alongside Yellow Claw (DJs), Walshy Fire of Major Lazer, Borgore, Baauer or Zomboy),

On April 18, 2016, the single "Feel the Street" is dropped on Ouroboros Records.

== Discography ==
=== EPs ===
- "Walking (Original and Remixes)" (2015)
- "The Big Picture - EP" (2015)

=== Singles ===
- "Boomerang (ft Shana P)" (June 2014 on Trap & Bass)
- "Maraboo" (September 2014 on LCD Records)
- "Get Crunk" (October 2014 on Wup Records)
- "Buck It" (February 2015 on Go Hard Records)
- "Upside Down (Vincz Lee ft. FireFLY, Popcaan, Riga & Cali P)" (April 2015 on Hemp Higher Productions)
- "Homeboat" (October 2015 on Plenum Records)
- "Feel The Street" (April 2016 on Ouroboros Records)
- "Popula (FireFLY x Riga x Propa Blend)" (June 2016 on Hemp Higher Records)
- "Pharaoh (FireFLY x The Hiiters)" (June 2016 on Electronyze Me Records)

=== Videos ===
- "FireFLY to the World" (November 2014, directed by ItsNow Media)
- "Walking" (May 2015, directed by Mark Angelil)
- "Dream" (November 2015, directed by Mark Angelil)
- "Live @ Illuzion, Phuket" (January 2016, directed by Cody MacFly Pictures)
