= Must Die! =

American electronic musician

MUST DIE!
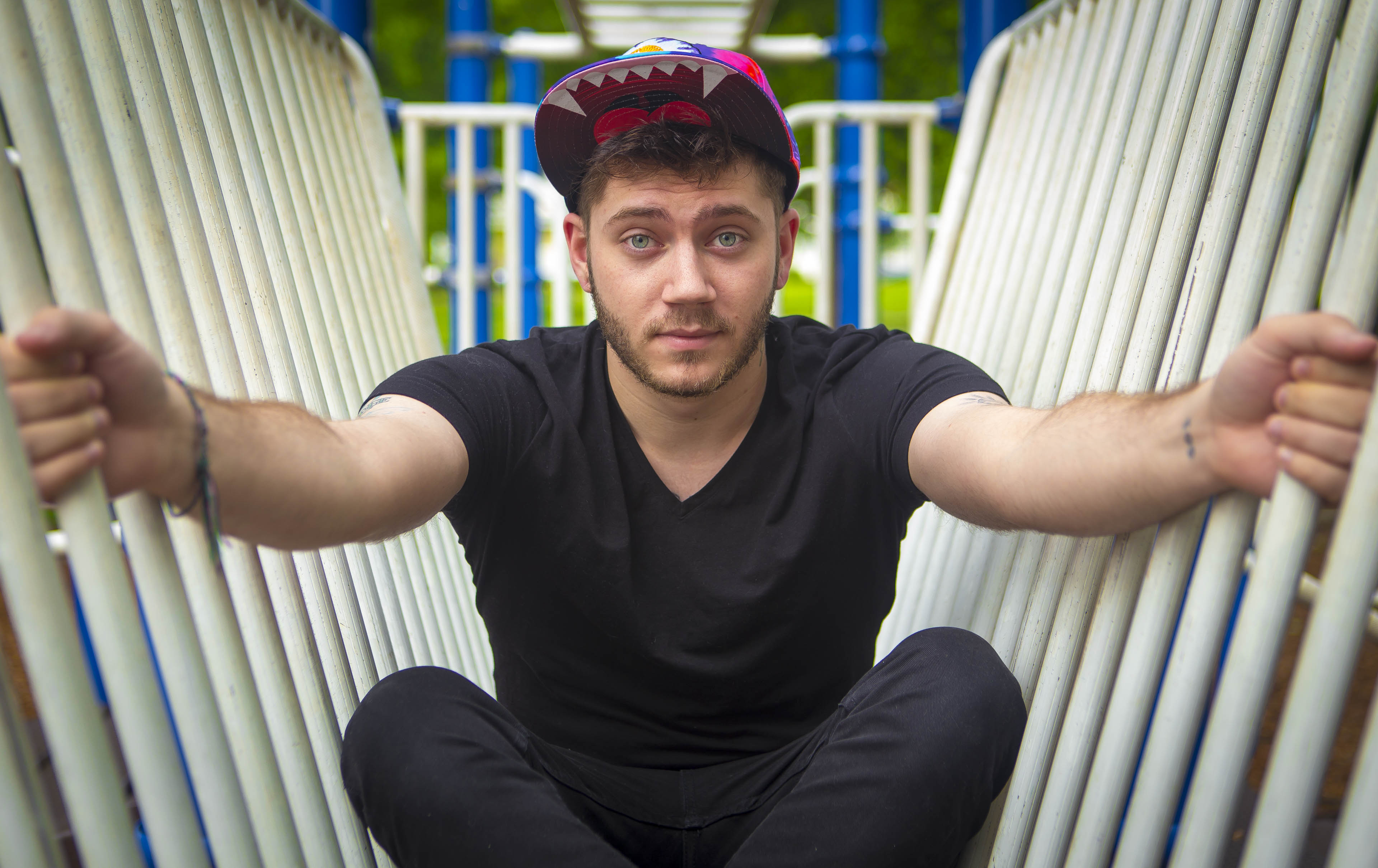
- Bates in 2013

Background information
- Born: Lee Austin Bates; July 2, 1991 (age 35)
- Origin: Houston, Texas, U.S.
- Genres: Dubstep, electro house, drum and bass
- Occupations: songwriter, producer, DJ
- Years active: 2012–present
- Labels: Never Say Die; Owsla; Dim Mak; Firepower; Kannibalen; Monstercat
- Member of: Hivemind
- Website: mustdiemusic.com

Lee Austin Bates (born July 2, 1991), better known by his alias Must Die (stylized as MUST DIE!), is an American electronic musician, DJ, and producer. Born in Houston, Bates is associated primarily for his music in the dubstep genre. Bates is known for the track "VIPs", a collaboration with American musician Skrillex, released on the label Owsla. Bates has collaborated with artists such as Skream, Eptic, Zomboy, and Boyinaband, and has produced remixes for Svdden Death, Seven Lions, Excision, and Slander, among others.

== Career ==
Bate's stage name is inspired by the title of the film John Tucker Must Die, stating that "I thought that naming myself after something terrible would be a good laugh".

Bates began releasing music under his current alias in 2012. That year, he released a remix of "The Drop" by Bro Safari. In 2013, he released a remix of Candyland's "Get Wild". Bates also produced several tracks on Dim Mak Records, including the extended play "Water Temple". He made his first release on the label Never Say Die Records with the extended play "Fever Dream", proceeding to release tracks less frequently. Bates first collaborated with English dubstep producer Zomboy on the track "Survivors", as part of Zomboy's LP "The Outbreak".

In September 2014, Bates released his first album, Death & Magic, on Skrillex's label Owsla. The opening track, "Gem Shards", is described by Mixmag as containing "giant builds, mammoth drops and piercing noises so sharp that they'll draw blood". Bates described the album as "equal parts moody and bright", saying he "wanted to weave between two vast extremes of musicality in order to show a full spectrum of diversity". A remix compilation for "Death & Magic" was released in 2015, including remixes from Ape Drums and Snails. Bates collaborated with English musician Boyinaband as part of a challenge to create an album within a day, resulting in the album "Common Drop". Bates also collaborated with Skrillex on the track "VIPs", and proceeded to produce a remix of the track in 2018.

Bates continued to release music through Never Say Die Records throughout later years. Bates released the 4-track EP "Forever Digital" in September 2017, featuring a more futuristic style of dubstep, and described as "filled with thunderous percussion and explosive synths". He also appeared in the label compilation "Hyper Future II". This was followed by a remix of Slander and Saymyname's "I Can't Escape", released through Insomniac.

In February 2019, Bates released "BLISS 2K" on Never Say Die, a dubstep track with hardstyle influences. This was continued with "CHAOS", released on May of the same year, and "EPIPHANY RUSH" in June. In August 2019, Bates produced a remix of Svdden Death's "Castles". Bates made several more notable releases throughout 2019, including "MISERY SYSTEM", and "FUNERAL ZONE". Bates collaborated with Zomboy a second time on the track "Revival" for the EP Rott & Roll Pt. 2.

In August 2020, Bates released a remix of the song "Another Me" by Seven Lions, Excision, and Wooli. Bates announced his second album, titled CRISIS VISION, in April 2021, which was released on Never Say Die Records the following month and featured increasing influences from techno and hard dance. This was preceded with several singles from the album on the label, including "NERVE DAMAGE", "HELLBURST", and "SORROW TECH". The announcement was followed by the single "LOL OK", a collaboration with dubstep producer Skream and Akeos.

In 2022, Bates collaborated with Zomboy on a track on Zomboy's EP Dead Man Walking Pt. 1. He released the single "ANGELWARE" later in March. He then made an appearance on Eptic's debut album, The End of the World, on the song Skill Check. In November of that year, he released his third album, FERAL FANTASY, through Create Music Group, which includes collaborations from producers Lil Texas, Descender, and Water Spirit. It was preceded by the singles "GRAVEBLOOM", "U SHOULD KNOW", and "KEEP U SAFE".

In 2023, Bates released the VAMPIRE WEAPON: CRIMSON EP through Create Music Group, preceded by the singles "DALLAS", "UNDERGROUND", and "ETERNALLY", the latter of which featured Bates performing his own deathcore vocals.

In 2024, Bates created the Hivemind alias alongside fellow dubstep musicians Kayzo and Space Laces. Bates made his debut release on Monstercat in 2025 with "Back 2 The Rave", a collaboration with Kayzo.

== Discography ==
=== Albums ===
Title	Details
Vines	Released: 9 November 2012
Death & Magic	Released: 10 September 2014
Common Drop (with Boyinaband)	Released: 25 December 2014
Crisis Vision	Released: 21 May 2021
Feral Fantasy	Released: 4 November 2022
Vampire Weapon: Midnight	Released: 8 November 2024

=== Extended plays ===
Year	Title
2012	Sky Child
2013	Live it Up
2013	Caffeine
2013	Kawaii Killaz (with Taste Tester)
2013	Water Temple
2013	Tokyo Police (with CRNKN)
2013	Fever Dream Part I
2013	Fever Dream Part II
2015	Neo Tokyo
2017	Forever Digital
2023	Vampire Weapon: Crimson
