= Figure (musician) =

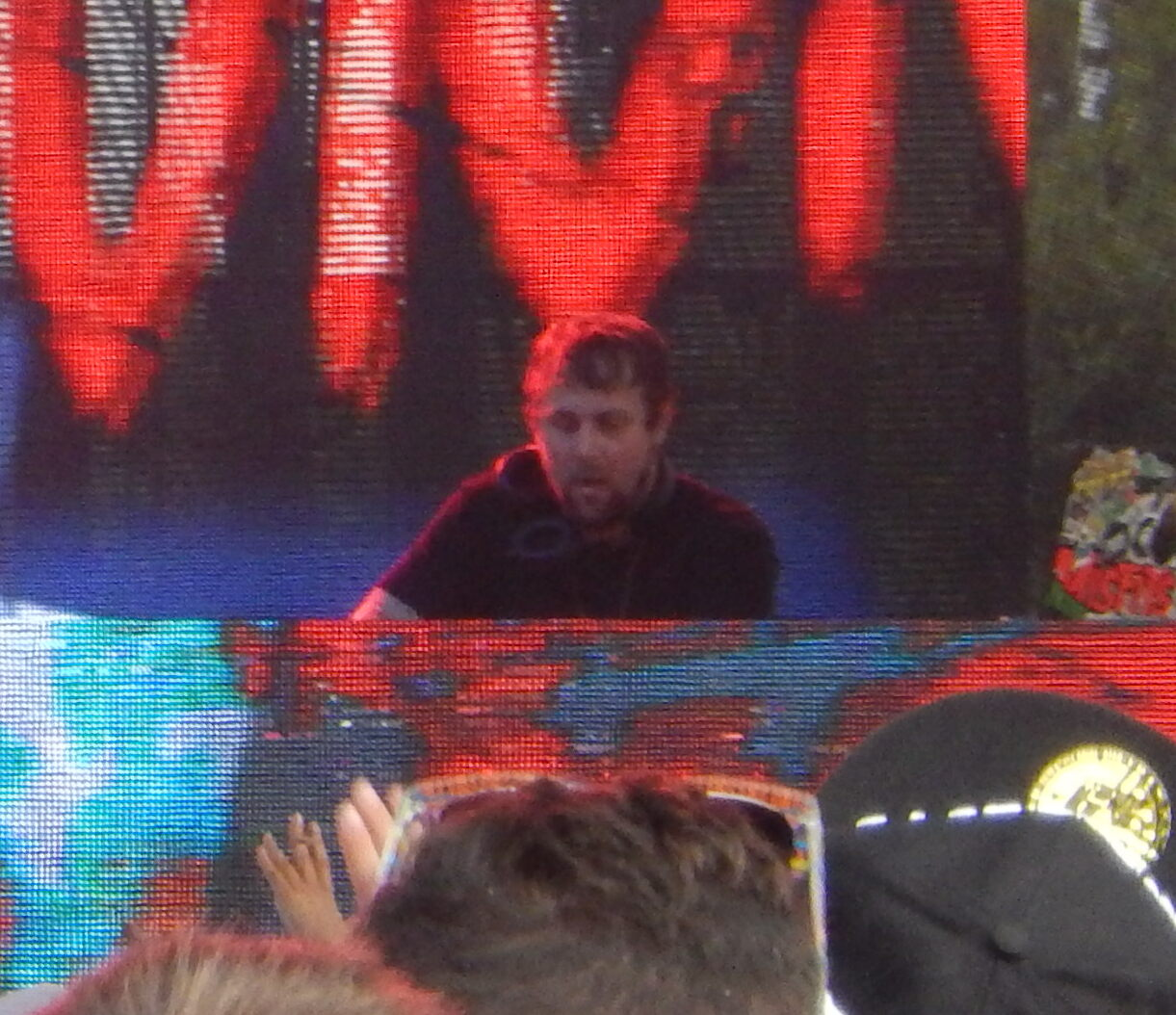
- Performing at the 2015 Spring Awakening Music Festival

Background information
- Born: Josh Gard; 22 February 1986 (age 40)
- Origin: Evansville, Indiana
- Genres: Dubstep, drumstep, electronic
- Occupations: Music producer, DJ
- Years active: 2009–present
- Labels: DOOM Music; Owsla; Never Say Die; Disciple; Rottun; SMOG; Cyclops Recordings
- Website: imfigure.com

Josh Gard, better known by his stage name Figure, is an American electronic music producer and DJ.

== Career ==
Figure is largely known for his Monsters series, which features drumstep tracks mixed with horror movie samples. As of 2025, he has released 14 volumes in the series. Since 2012 Universal Studios have enlisted him to supply the soundtrack for their annual event Halloween Horror Nights.

Besides his horror themed releases, Figure has also ventured into traditional electronic music genres. On September 10, 2013, he released an EP titled "Horns of the Apocalypse" through the record label Owsla. Further showcasing his abilities, Figure released a full-length album titled "Gravity" on August 31, 2015.

Figure's song "Monster Mania" was featured on the sixth episode of season eleven of the show, It's Always Sunny in Philadelphia.

== Discography ==
=== Albums ===
Title	Details	Tracklist
Gravity	Released: 31 August 2015; Label: DOOM Music; Formats: Digital download	1. One Million Tons of Starship; 2. Destiny Awaits; 3. Slime Station; 4. Check My Movements with Adeem & KJ Sawka; 5. Beware; 6. We Are Ready; 7. Robbin The Rich; 8. Terminated; 9. Aligned; 10. From Mars With Love (ft. Siff); 11. Stars That Never Burn Out; 12. Gravity (ft Whiskey Pete); 13. 9MM; 14. Ready For Action (ft. A Plus); 15. Who's Next; 16. Infinite Lives; 17. First Night On Planet F

=== Monsters series ===
Title	Details	Tracklist
Monsters of Drumstep, Vol. 1	Released: 28 February 2011; Label: DOOM Music; Formats: Digital download	1. Aliens; 2. Vampires; 3. Zombies; 4. Frankenstein with Kanji Kinetic; 5. Aliens (VIP Edit); 6. Zombies (VIP Edit)
Monsters of Drumstep, Vol. 2	Released: 18 October 2011; Label: DOOM Music; Formats: Digital download	1. Boogie Man; 2. Leather Face; 3. Werewolf (VIP Edit); 4. The Mummy with Gangsta Fun; 5. Mr. Hyde; 6. Monster's Revenge; 7. The Werewolf (The Killabits Remix); 8. Boogie Man (Oblivion Remix); 9. Leather Face (Captain Panic! Remix); 10. The Mummy (VIP Edit) with Gangsta Fun
Monsters, Vol. 3	Released: 16 October 2012; Label: DOOM Music; Formats: Digital download	1. The Grave Yard; 2. The Grave Yard (Dr. Ozi Remix); 3. Jack the Ripper with Bare; 4. The Corpse Grinders; 5. The Corpse Grinders (Phrenik Remix); 6. Otis; 7. Creepin (feat. Proe); 8. Creepin (feat. Proe) (Alex Sin Remix); 9. Pounds of Blood with Tommy Lee; 10. No Turning Back; 11. No Turning Back (J.Rabbit Remix); 12. Dead or Alive (feat. Messinian); 13. Michael Myers is Dead; 14. Michael Myers is Dead (Oscillator Z Remix); 15. The Werewolf (Ariok Remix)
Monsters, Vol. 4	Released: 15 October 2013; Label: DOOM Music; Formats: Digital download	1. Deaths Gospel (feat. Brawninoff); 2. The Crypt (feat. Khadfi Dub); 3. Center of Hell (feat. Helicopter Showdown); 4. Nightmares (Interlude); 5. The Giant Eyeball; 6. The Blob (feat. Dirty Deeds); 7. Symphony of the Damned (Interlude); 8. Living Dead; 9. Are You Afraid of the Dark (feat. Lexi Norton); 10. The Blob Returns (feat. Dirty Deeds); 11. Ade Due Damballa; 12. The Devil; 13. Cocytus (feat. Travis Pealer) (Outro)
Monsters Selected Remixes	Released: 13 December 2013; Label: DOOM Music; Formats: Digital download	1. Aliens (The Damn Bell Doors Remix); 2. Center of Hell (Gangsta Fun Remix); 3. The Blob (1UP Remix); 4. Michael Myers is Dead (Jack Bass Remix); 5. Are You Afraid of the Dark (Phrenik Remix); 6. Are You Afraid of the Dark (Zardonic Remix)
Monsters, Vol. 5	Released: 14 October 2014; Label: DOOM Music; Formats: Digital download	1. House on Haunted Hill (feat. CasOne); 2. Monster Mania; 3. It's Alive (feat. D Styles); 4. Friday the 13th 5. Never Sleep Again (Interlude); 6. Freddy Krueger; 7. Pumpkinhead (feat. Kool Keith); 8. Return to House on Haunted Hill; 9. Evil Dead; 10. Pennywise the Clown (feat. CasOne); 11. Jason is Dead (feat. Bitter Stephens); 12. Creature From the Black Lagoon; 13. Stay Out of the Cellar (Outro)
Selected Remixes, Vol. 2	Released: 15 January 2015; Label: DOOM Music; Formats: Digital download	1. Pumpkinhead (LUMBERJVCK Remix); 2. Freddy Krueger (Downlink Remix); 3. Evil Dead (Dack Janiels Remix); 4. The Werewolf (Midnight Tyrannosaurus Remix); 5. Pennywise the Clown (Twofold Remix); 6. It's Alive (BlackMask Remix)
Monsters 6.66	Released: 6 October 2015; Label: DOOM Music; Formats: Digital download	1. Blood Thirsty (feat. CasOne & Bitter Stephens); 2. Creatures of the Night (feat. Bitter Stephens); 3. The Witches Revenge; 4. Trick or Treat with 2FAC3D; 5. Goosebumps with Brawler; 6. Your Worst Fear with Dakota; 7. Torture and Terror with Midnight Tyrannosaurus; 8. The Man in the Hallway
Monsters 7	Released: 7 October 2016; Label: DOOM Music; Formats: Digital download	1. The Exorcist; 2. Black Magick; 3. RedRum with Code:Pandorum; 4. The Omen; 5. The Ritual with Dack Janiels; 6. Hellraiser with Bare; 7. Suspiria
Monsters 7 Remixes	Released: 3 February 2017; Label: DOOM Music; Formats: Digital download	1. Black Magick (Sudden Death Remix); 2. The Exorcist (Oolacile Remix); 3. Suspiria (Code:Pandorum Remix); 4. Black Magick (HEHVY Remix); 5. Black Magick (Ironhide Remix); 6. Hellraiser (Tempest Remix); 7. The Ritual (Dubscribe Remix); 8. The Exorcist (Dakota Remix); 9. The Ritual (SQUNTO Remix); 10. Hellraiser (Dmise Remix)
Monsters 8	Released: 13 October 2017; Label: DOOM Music; Formats: Digital download	1. The Werewolf Returns; 2. The Ring; 3. Hell House; 4. The Spider with TenGraphs; 5. Eve Of Terror (Interlude); 6. The Fog; 7. The Twilight Zone (ft. Hatch); 8. Maniac with Dmise; 9. Reverse Bear Trap (ft. Effin); 10. Phantasm; 11. Man Or Monster (Outro)
Monsters 8: The Remixes	Released: 28 November 2017; Label: DOOM Music; Formats: Digital download	1. Return of the Werewolf (Kozmoz & Zempra Remix); 2. The Ring (Sluggo Remix); 3. Reverse Bear Trap (ft. Effin) (YAKZ Remix); 4. The Spider with TenGraphs (Boogie T Remix); 5. Phantasm (Bare Remix); 6. Reverse Bear Trap (ft. Effin) (Chainlynx Remix); 7. The Spider with TenGraphs (HEHVY Remix); 8. The Twilight Zone (ft. Hatch) (Nocturne Remix); 9. The Fog (WHISKERS & LVNKY Remix); 10. Phantasm (2FAC3D Remix); 11. The Spider with TenGraphs (Kill Rex Remix); 12. The Twilight Zone (ft. Hatch) (Psykik Remix); 13. The Fog (Dubscribe Remix); 14. Phantasm (Luzcid Remix)
The Asylum (Monsters 9)	Released: 10 October 2018; Label: DOOM Music; Formats: Digital download	1. Welcome to the Asylum (ft. Don't Kill It); 2. Dr.Death with Dack Janiels; 3. Patient 138; 4. Dissociative Identity with 2FAC3D; 5. The Sound of Surgery (Binaural); 6. Lobotomy (ft. Born I); 7. The Voices (ft. Hatch); 8. Shock Therapy; 9. Schizophrenia; 10. Ear Drill Operation; 11. Sleep Paralysis; 12. The Escape (ft. Don't Kill It); 13. Uncompromising Darkness (ft. Hatch)
Monsters 10	Released: 11 October 2019; Label: DOOM Music; Formats: Digital download	1. My Monster Mansion (Intro); 2. The Phantom of the Opera with Dubscribe; 3. Poltergeist; 4. Spirits of the Dead with Graphyt; 5. The Crooked Man (feat. Lexi Norton); 6. Madhouse with Code: Pandorum; 7. Vampire Hunter; 8. Necromancy with Lev3l; 9. Monster Squad with HEHVY; 10. Dinner with Demons; 11. Candyman with Kleavr & Tantrum; 12. Riddim of the Living Dead with Point.Blank; 13. The Hearse Song (feat. Lexi Norton) with Big N Slim
XI Monstrum (Monsters 11)	Released: 2 October 2020; Label: DOOM Music; Formats: Digital download	1. The Unholy; 2. The Devils Reaper (Unreleased); 3. Welcome To Your Death with 2FAC3D; 4. Cannibal Inferno; 5. If It Bleeds (feat. Born I); 6. Lilith's Invocation; 7. Abaddon's Wrath; 8. Ravenous Flesh with Contakt; 9. Dead Shall Rise; 10. The Gates Of Hell with Point.Blank; 11. Ancient Evil with Ryan Browne
Monsters 12	Released: 15 October 2021; Label: DOOM Music; Formats: Digital download	1. They Come At Night; 2. Something Evil with ENiGMA Dubz; 3. The Boogeyman; 4. Flesh Ripper with Contakt; 5. It's Under The Bed with FLOZE; 6. Slenderman by with 2FAC3D; 7. I Eat Your Skin I Drink Your Blood; 8. The Deadly Organ; 9. The House That Dripped Blood; 10. Fright Night; 11. Dawn of the Dead with Terravita; 12. If You Dare with Slasher Dave; 13. Babadook with Contakt; 14. Zombies Ate My Ravers with MDK
Monsters 13	Released: 13 October 2022; Label: DOOM Music; Formats: Digital download	1. The Final Chapter; 2. Jason's Revenge; 3. Ghostface; 4. CreepShow; 5. Camp Terror with Contakt; 6. Zombie Chase; 7. Frankenstein's Fury; 8. Suffering And Pain; 9. The Cenobites; 10. Raver Decapitation; 11. Total Fright; 12. Night Terrors; 13. Funeral For Monsters
Monsters Undead	Released: 1 October 2024; Label: DOOM Music; Formats: Digital download	1. The Grudge with DIZZYINBLACK; 2. The Hills Have Eyes; 3. House of 1000 Corpses with Dack Janiels; 4. The Thing with Cynzo; 5. Terrifier; 6. Amityville Horror with SPLNTR; 7. Freddy vs Jason with Contakt; 8. Haunted Mansion; 9. Blair Witch (feat. Smokey); 10. Mutilator with Destryur
Monsters, Vol. 1 (15th Anniversary)	Released: 16 June 2025; Label: DOOM Music; Formats: Digital download	1. Aliens; 2. Vampires; 3. Zombies; 4. Frankenstein with Kanji Kinetic; 5. Werewolf (VIP Edit); 6. Aliens [Reprise]; 7. Super Mega Death Ray (Show Edit); 8. Aliens (Super Zeroes Remix)

=== Extended plays ===
Title	Details
In & Out of Brooklyn	Released: 25 February 2009; Label: Dirty Fabric Digital; Formats: Digital download
House On the Hill	Released: 11 September 2009; Label: Freaks Like Us Entertainment; Formats: Digital download
The Doses / War Fair	Released: 12 January 2010; Label: Copyright Control; Formats: Digital download
Show You Bass	Released: 13 December 2010; Label: Jack Knife Records; Formats: Digital download
The Phantom	Released: 18 April 2011; Label: LU10 Records; Formats: Digital download
The Destruction Series, Vol. 1	Released: 3 July 2012; Label: DOOM Music; Formats: Digital download
Horns of the Apocalypse	Released: 10 September 2013; Label: OWSLA; Formats: Digital download
Halloween Triple Feature	Released: 31 October 2017; Label: DOOM Music; Formats: Digital download
Incident 86	Released: 27 April 2018; Label: Disciple Records; Formats: Digital download
Heartbeat of Hell	Released: 13 July 2018; Label: Never Say Die Records; Formats: Digital download
The Destroyer	Released: 12 April 2019; Label: DOOM Music; Formats: Digital download
BIOPUNK	Released: 19 May 2023; Label: DOOM Music; Formats: Digital download
Dungeon of Doom	Released: 13 October 2023; Label: DOOM Music; Formats: Digital download
Frightmare with Destryur	Released: 25 October 2024; Label: NRW Records; Formats: Digital download

=== Singles ===
Title	Details	Tracklist
Cowabunga	Released: 7 July 2014; Label: Rottun Recordings; Formats: Digital download	1. Cowabunga
Traptor	Released: 14 November 2014; Label: Uplink Audio; Formats: Digital download	1. Traptor with Twofold; 2. Traptor (Trap VIP) with Twofold
Chew You to Pieces	Released: 25 May 2016; Label: SMOG Records; Formats: Digital download	1. Chew You to Pieces with Kill Rex
Death	Released: 7 July 2016; Label: DOOM Music; Formats: Digital download	1. Death with 2FAC3D
Future Retro	Released: 19 January 2024; Label: Cyclops Recordings; Formats: Digital download	1. Soundwave; 2. Old School
Raining Blood	Released: 5 April 2024; Label: Sounds of Mayhem; Formats: Digital download	1. Raining Blood with Planet Blood
