= DC Breaks =

British drum and bass production duo

- Origin: London, England
- Genre: Drum and bass
- Years active: 2006–present
- Labels: Ram Records, Viper Recordings, Frequency Recordings, DC Breaks Recordings, Restless Natives
- Members: Dan Havers; Chris Page

DC Breaks are a British drum and bass production duo made up of Dan Havers and Chris Page. After being discovered and nurtured by Scotland's DJ Kid, they went on to sign a record deal with RAM Records, run by the producer Andy C. They have produced numerous remixes for major record labels, including artists such as Tinie Tempah, I Blame Coco, Paloma Faith, Example, Esmée Denters and Rox. In April 2017, their debut album Different Breed was released on RAM Records.

== Biography ==
In 2010, they signed a record deal with RAM Records, run by the producer Andy C. DC Breaks appeared on BBC Radio 1Xtra's mix show for Crissy Criss.

They released their first EP on Viper Recordings in May 2010 which included their well-known track "Halo", and also had their tracks featured on Andy C's Nightlife compilation series and Futurebound's compilation Acts of Madmen (2009).

They have produced numerous remixes for major record labels, including artists such as Tinie Tempah, I Blame Coco, Paloma Faith, Example, Esmée Denters and Rox.

In April 2017, their debut album Different Breed was released on RAM Records.

== Discography ==
=== Albums ===
Year	Release	Label
2017	Different Breed	RAM Records
2021	DCXV	RAM Records

=== EPs and Singles ===
Year	Release	Label
2020	"We Never Slow Down" (featuring Eva Lazarus)	RAM Records
2020	"Back For More" / "Pickett Line (Technimatic Remix)"	RAM Records
2020	"Raise The Bar" / "Concrete Jungle (Skantia Remix)"	RAM Records
2020	"Club Thug"	RAM Records
2019	"Spectrum" (with Smooth)	RAM Records
2019	"Opposition" / "Higher VIP" (with Loadstar featuring Doktor)	Bassrush Records
2019	"Halo VIP" / "Mankind 2019"	Viper Recordings
2018	"Gambino (InsideInfo Remix)" / "Remember (Loadstar Remix)"	RAM Records
2018	"Never Stop (S.P.Y Remix)" / "Hustle (Synergy Remix)"	RAM Records
2018	"Vendetta (A.M.C & Turno Remix)" / "Everybody (Flowidus Remix)"	RAM Records
2018	"Infinity VIP" / "Underground (Tantrum Desire Remix)"	RAM Records
2017	"Everybody"	RAM Records
2017	"Underground"	RAM Records
2016	"Arcade" / "Creeper VIP"	RAM Records
2016	"Bambino" / "Bad Flow"	RAM Records
2015	"Breathe"	RAM Records / Virgin EMI
2015	"If This Is Love"	RAM Records / Virgin EMI
2015	"Faithless / Gambino VIP"	RAM Records / Virgin EMI
2015	"Sidewinder"	RAM Records
2014	"Lock In" / "Shakedown"	RAM Records
2013	"Gambino" / "Burning"	RAM Records
2013	"Swag" / "Proton"	RAM Records
2013	"Shaman" / "Let It Go"	RAM Records
2012	"Firez" EP	RAM Records
2012	"Snake Style" (vs. Document One)	Buygore
2011	"Creeper" / "Horror"	RAM Records
2011	"The More I Want" / "Take That"	RAM Records
2011	"Emperor"	Restless Natives
2010	"Halo" EP	Viper Recordings
2009	"Pickett Line" / "Flashback"	Frequency Recordings
2009	"Hysteria" / "Circus"	Sudden Def Recordings
2008	"Taken" / "Come Closer"	Frequency Recordings
2008	"Romper" / "Mankind"	Viper Recordings
2008	"Do You Believe VIP"	Restless Natives
2007	"Hear This" / "Cold Thing"	DC Breaks Recordings
2007	"Sicko" / "Soho"	DC Breaks Recordings
2006	"Trust Me" / "El Mariachi"	High Lite Recordings
2006	"Emperor" / "Horizon"	Restless Natives
2006	“Firez”	Restless Natives
2023	“Swag”	Restless Natives

=== Other appearances ===
Year	Release	Album / EP	Label
2015	"Sidewinder"	Free Download	RAM Records
2013	"Slugs"	Andy C: Nightlife 6	RAM Records
2012	"Snake Style" / "Take A Ride" (with Document One)	Snake Style / Take A Ride	Buygore
2012	"Breathless" (with Bassnectar and Mimi Page)	Freestyle	Amorphous Music
2012	"Killer" (with SKisM featuring Dee Freer)	Division EP	Never Say Die Records
2010	"Pickett Line (VIP Mix)"	Andy C: Nightlife	RAM Records
2010	"Rumble (Mash Up Mix)" (vs. Reso and Vent)	Rumble (Mash Up Mix)	Subway
2009	"Polar Bear"	Acts of Mad Men	Viper Recordings

=== Remixes ===
Artist	Track	Label
Alex Clare	"Treading Water"	Island Records
Bertie Blackman	"Byrds Of Prey"	EQ
Disaszt	"Together"	Mainframe Recordings
Eelke Kleijn	"Mistakes"	Spinnin' / RAM
Erik Hassle	"Hurtful"	Island Records
Example	"Won't Go Quietly"	Ministry Of Sound
Fytch, Captain Crunch & Carmen Forbes	"Raindrops"	Strictly Rhythm
Hidden Orchestra	"Vorka"	Tru Thoughts
Hold Tight	"Lounge"	Spearhead
I Blame Coco	"Spirit Golden"	Island Records
Jerome Price	"Me Minus You"	DMC
JLS	"The Club Is Alive"	Sony Records
Jupiter Ace	"Glowing In The Dark"	Big Vision Records
Koven	"More Than You"	Viper Recordings
Loadstar	"Give It To Me"	RAM Records
London Grammar	"Oh Woman Oh Man"	Ministry of Sound
Melissa Steel featuring Popcaan	"Kisses for Breakfast"	Renowned / Warner
Mindflow	"Switched"	Never Say Die Records
Misha B	"Home Run"	Relentless Records
PhaseOne	"Broken Chains"	Disciple Recordings
Professor Green featuring Tori Kelly	"Lullaby"	Virgin
Ram Trilogy	"Terminal 2"	RAM Records
Reso & Vent	"Rumble"	Subway
ROX	"My Baby"	Rough Trade Records
ROX	"No Going Back"	Rough Trade Records
Seinabo Sey	"Pretend"	RAM Records
Soft Toy Emergency	"Critical"	All Around the World Productions
Paloma Faith	"Upside Down"	Sony Records
Tinie Tempah	"Pass Out"	EMI
The Wanted	"I Found You"	Island Records
Zeds Dead & Omar LinX	"Cowboy"	Ultra Records
Zomboy	"Beast in the Belly"	Never Say Die Records

=== Production credits ===
Year	Title	Artist	Album
2011	"Never Had a Day" (co-produced by Sheldrake)	Example	Playing in the Shadows
