= Kannibalen Records =

Canadian electronic music record label

- Founded: 2011; 15 years ago
- Founder: Black Tiger Sex Machine
- Genre: Bass music; Dubstep; Drum and bass; Electro; Electro house; Future bass; Trap
- Country of origin: Canada
- Location: Montreal, Quebec, Canada
- Official website: www.kannibalenrecords.com

Kannibalen Records is a Canadian independent electronic music record label based in Montreal, Quebec, Canada. Notable artists that released on the label include Apashe, Black Tiger Sex Machine (BTSM), Dabin, Kai Wachi, and Snails.

== History ==
Prior to the record label's founding in 2011, BTSM used to throw monthly electronic music parties at Le Belmont Nightclub, located in Montreal, called "Kannibalen" (lit. 'Cannibals'). Once BTSM officially formed Kannibalen Records, the name was picked due to its homage to the parties' theme of being "gory and gruesome".

Kannibalen was founded as an in-between option that both smaller labels and the bigger labels, such as the Big three, didn't ideally offer for up-and-coming artists. BTSM wanted a record label that operates under a "free-but-focused" business philosophy. This meant two things for artists: Firstly, artists would exercise more "creative and timeline control" than what big labels typically have while simultaneously taking all the responsibility for setting and meeting their own expectations. Secondly, Kannibalen would offer benefits such as the business administration and marketing aspects of being an artist and have networking opportunities with promoters and artists in the electronic music industry; Both aspects that smaller labels lacked.

Kannibalen also releases its bi-weekly podcast called Kannibalen Radio: an hour-long DJ mix showcasing "unreleased tracks by well-known and undiscovered electronic music producers" within and outside the label.

Kannibalen also has partnerships with third-party companies in the television, movie, and advertising industries.

== Artists ==
- 2DY4
- Aglory
- Antagonïzer
- Apashe
- Atliens
- Black Tiger Sex Machine
- Blanke
- Crankdat
- Dabin
- Dead Battery
- Dion Timmer
- Draeden
- Dylan Matthew
- Famous Dex
- Feint
- Future Exit
- Fytch
- Ghastly
- Hairitage
- Heyz
- Hi I'm Ghost
- Hvdes
- I-Exist
- Izzy Vadim
- Jaykode
- Josh Teed
- Kai Wachi
- KJ Sawka
- Kompany
- Lektrique
- Lo Spirit
- Must Die!
- Nitti Gritti
- PhaseOne
- Phocust
- Riot
- Runn
- Ruvlo
- Snails
- Spag (fka Spag Heddy)
- Subtronics
- Sullivan King
- Swarm
- The Living Proof
- Vampa
- Vanic
- Vladimir Cauchemar
- Void (0)
- William Black
- Wodd
- Yookie

== Discography ==
Title	Details	Recording Type
Kannibals at the Beach	Released: May 28, 2012; Format: Digital download	Album
Kannibalen Christmas Stocking Vol. 2	Released: December 16, 2014; Format: Digital download	EP
All I Want For Christmas Is Bass	Released: December 21, 2016; Format: Digital download	EP
All I Want For Christmas Is Bass Vol. 3	Released: December 19, 2018; Format: Digital download	EP
All I Want For Christmas Is Bass Vol. 4	Released: December 20, 2019; Format: Digital download	EP
All I Want For Christmas Is Bass Vol. 5	Released: December 18, 2020; Format: Digital download	EP
All I Want For Christmas Is Bass Vol. 6	Released: December 21, 2022; Format: Digital download	EP
Kannibals at the Beach Vol. 2	Released: September 1, 2023; Format: Digital download	Album
All I Want For Christmas Is Bass Vol. 7	Released: December 22, 2023; Format: Digital download	EP
Kannibals at the Beach Vol. 3	Released: July 19, 2024; Format: Digital download	Album
All I Want For Christmas Is Bass Vol. 8	Released: December 13, 2024; Format: Digital download	Album
Kannibals at the Beach Vol. 4	Released: August 8, 2025; Format: Digital download	Album
All I Want For Christmas Is Bass Vol. 9	Released: December 19, 2025; Format: Digital download	Album

== See also ==
- List of electronic music record labels
