= Space Laces =

American electronic musician and DJ

- Also known as: cornandbeans
- Born: Ian Slider
- Origin: Louisville, Kentucky, U.S.
- Genres: Dubstep, bass house, electro house
- Occupations: songwriter, producer, DJ
- Years active: 2006–present
- Labels: Never Say Die; High Vaultage Records
- Member of: Hivemind; Masterhand
- Website: spacelaces.com

Ian Slider, better known by his stage name Space Laces, is an American electronic musician and DJ. Slider is known for his work in bass music and his releases through British record label Never Say Die Records. Slider was a frequent collaborator of Canadian dubstep producer Excision in the 2010s, including on the dubstep group Destroid. Slider first produced music under the alias cornandbeans, which he allegedly abandoned in 2008.

Slider is also known for his Vaultage series, each of which is a continuous mix of then-unreleased music. There are currently four installments. The latest, Vaultage 004, was released in December 2025. Slider is a member of the hard dance group Hivemind with fellow American dubstep producers Must Die! and Kayzo. Slider also formed dubstep group Masterhand with Eptic and Svdden Death.

== Career ==
Slider released his debut extended play (EP), Overdrive, on Never Say Die Records in 2018. One of its tracks, "Choppaz", is a collaboration with fellow American dubstep producer Getter. He later released the extended play High Vaultage on Never Say Die in 2022.

After the closure of Never Say Die in 2022, Slider founded High Vaultage Records, releasing the track "Survive" on the label in January 2023.

Slider collaborated with French record producer DJ Snake with the track "Reloaded", which was released in May 2025. Slider has also collaborated with American DJ Marshmello on multiple occasions, including on "Conquer" in February 2024, which was later followed by "Rave Repeater" in December 2024. Slider collaborated with American DJ Skrillex on "Recovery", the seventh track on Skrillex's fourth studio album, Fuck U Skrillex You Think Ur Andy Warhol but Ur Not!!.
