= Never Say Die Records =

British independent dubstep and bass music record label

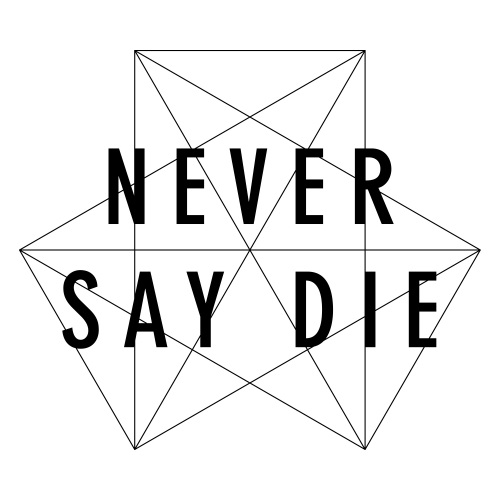
- Official logo for Never Say Die Records (since 28 July 2015)
- Founded: First stint: 17 July 2009; 17 years ago Second stint: 5 June 2026; 4 months ago
- Founder: SKisM; Nicholas "Mobscene" Sadler
- Defunct: N/A
- Status: Active (Re-emerged 2026)
- Genre: Bass music; Bass house; Breakbeat; Complextro; Dubstep; Drum and bass; Drumstep; Electro house; Future house; Glitch hop; Moombahcore; Riddim; Trap
- Country of origin: United Kingdom
- Location: Clacton-On-Sea, England, United Kingdom
- Official website: wewillneversaydie.com

Never Say Die Records is a British electronic music record label well-known for releasing bass music, dubstep, and trap music records The label is home to artists such as Dodge & Fuski, Dr. Ozi, Eptic, Habstrakt, Kompany, Megalodon, LAXX, Spag Heddy, Space Laces, Must Die!, Trampa, and Zomboy.

== History ==
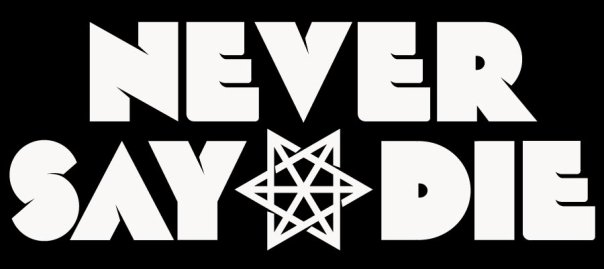
Never Say Die's first and previous logo

Never Say Die was founded and incorporated as a limited company (LTD) in London on 17 July 2009 by two dubstep artists: Thomas Petais (aka SKisM) and Nicholas "Mobscene" Sadler. Petais founded Never Say Die because he "wanted to continue making bass music and working in the industry" due to the decline of the breaks scene; a scene he used to be in. On 7 December 2009, Never Say Die released its very first single, with remixes from other artists, called Ruffneck 09 by Ctrl-Z & The Freestylers with vocals from Reggae artist Navigator.

The name "Never Say Die" is a reference to a quote "Goonies Never Say Die" from the 1985 film called The Goonies. Petais owned merchandise from the film, and selected the name for the label because of that fact.

No Tomorrow Recordings

In February 2013, Never Say Die launched its very first sublabel called No Tomorrow Recordings as "a new platform for artists wanting to reach out to other genres [outside of Never Say Die's primary genres] like electro, trap and much more".

On 6 May 2013 the label collaborated with electronic music news outlet Your EDM to set up a launch party to celebrate the release of Eptic's Mastermind EP.

In April 2014, the label won Best Label from The Bass Music Awards (BMA).

Never Say Die moved its headquarters twice: first from London to Birmingham, England in 2016 and, finally to its current location, from Birmingham to Clacton-on-Sea, England in 2021.

In 2019, Never Say Die celebrated its 10th anniversary by going having various of its artists perform at the Shrine Exposition Hall in Los Angeles, the Mission Ballroom in Denver, Electric Brixton in London, and the Eden Club in Chengdu

On 2 April 2022 Never Say Die announced and explained that it would no longer release any more tracks due to its team "achiev[ing] everything [it] set out to do (and more...)" and wanting "to move onto other things". The record label hasn't dissolved, thus making the label inactive instead.

In June 2026, Never Say Die unexpectedly announced a final compilation album, Never Say Die Vol. 7, accompanied by a mix from SKisM that spans a hundred tracks. Following the release of Vol. 7, SKisM announced the comeback of Never Say Die Records in a new formula, with infrequent releases and still the same accent put on quality control. The Legacy Album, consisting of remixes from the whole Never Say Die catalogue, was released on July 3rd, 2026.

=== Never Say Die Records: Black Label ===
Official logo of Never Say Die Records: Black Label

On 30 March 2014 Never Say Die launched a sublabel called Black Label where its darker-themed, and "simple but wonky groove[d]" tracks were released. Black Label was started because for a sound to accommodate the "new underswell of dubstep that was happening at the time". Those that were considered more melodic submissions were released on Never Say Die. In March 2021, the sublabel was discontinued due to the music, being released on both labels, sounding relatively indifferent from one another, compared to both labels' respective vision. The record label released 2,000 free NFTs via to commemorate the sublabel's legacy.

=== Controversy with Disciple Records ===
In 2013, Never Say Die's founders co-founded, along with Dodge & Fuski, Disciple Records. In 2017, Petais accused Disciple Records, via Facebook and Twitter, of "copying [Never Say Die's] marketing scheme". Disciple Records acknowledged that while Never Say Die "contributed towards early label expenses..." and "introduc[ed]. numerous contacts" to set itself up for success, it rebutted by stating that it wasn't a "marketing ploy on [Disciple's] part".

== Artists ==
- 12th Planet
- 501
- Ace Aura
- Adair
- Akeos
- Akronym
- Antiserum
- Aweminus
- Axel Boy
- Badjokes
- Badklaat
- Bar9
- Blankface
- BloodThinnerz
- Calcium
- Carbin
- Cripplingg
- Cromatik
- Codd Dubz
- Ctrl-Z
- Cutline
- Cyclops
- Datsik
- DC Breaks
- Decimate
- Definitive
- Dodge & Fuski
- Dr. Ozi
- Dubloadz
- Ecraze
- Effin
- Eh!de
- Eliminate
- Eptic
- Euphee (fka Euphorian)
- Far Too Loud
- Figure
- Foreign Beggars
- Getter
- Gentlemens Club
- Gladez
- Graphyt
- Guillotine
- Habstrakt
- Hairitage
- Hekler
- Herobust
- Hukae
- Hydraulix
- Ivory
- Jiqui
- JoeB
- Jool
- Kill Feed
- K-Nine
- Kompany
- Krimer
- Kuatari
- Laxx
- Leotrix
- L.U.X
- Marauda (fka Mastadon)
- Megalodon
- Midnight Tyrannosaurus
- Moody Good
- Moore Kismet
- Must Die!
- Mvrda
- Nazaar
- Neonix
- Nitepunk
- Oddprophet
- P0gman
- PhaseOne
- Phiso
- Pleeg
- Ponicz
- Ray Volpe
- Rickyxsan
- SampliFire
- Seed
- Sharps
- SKisM
- Skybreak
- Slander
- Soltan
- Space Laces
- Spag (fka Spag Heddy)
- Stabby
- Stoltenhoff
- Stuca
- Subtronics
- Svdden Death
- Syzy
- Tisoki
- Topi
- Trampa
- Trilla
- Trolley Snatcha
- Trvcy
- Twine
- Ubur
- Veer
- Vulgatron
- Wooli
- Xaebor
- Yakz
- Yookie
- Zomboy

== Discography ==
Never Say Die Records discography
- Compilation albums: 20
- Compilation EPs: 34

=== Compilation Albums & EPs ===
The record label released a total of 54 compilation albums and EPs on its primary label and Black Label to showcase music by its artists.

==== Never Say Die Records ====
Title	Details	Recording Type
Never Say Die (Deluxe Edition)	Released: 27 May 2012; Format: CD, Digital download	Album
Spectrasonic	Released: 5 November 2012; Format: Digital download	EP
Never Say Die, Vol. 2	Released: 21 April 2013; Format: Digital download	Album
Never Say Die Fifty	Released: 16 December 2013; Format: Digital download	Album
Never Say Die, Vol. 3	Released: 20 October 2014; Format: Digital download	Album
Never Say Die, Vol. 4	Released: 22 January 2016; Format: Digital download	Album
Never Say Die One Hundred	Released: 10 March 2017; Format: Digital download	Album
Never Say Die, Vol. 5	Released: 11 December 2017; Format: Digital download	Album
Never Say Die, Vol. 6	Released: 14 December 2018; Format: Digital download	Album
Black Ops: Enhanced	Released: 17 September 2021; Format: Digital download	Album
Never Say Die, Vol. 7	Released: 5 June 2026; Format: Digital download	Album
Never Say Die Legacy	Released: 3 July 2026; Format: Digital download	Album

==== Never Say Die: Black Label ====
Title	Details	Recording Type
Black Label Vol. 1	Released: 31 March 2014; Format: Digital download	EP
Black Label Vol. 2	Released: 12 May 2014; Format: Digital download	EP
Black Label Vol. 3	Released: 20 October 2014; Format: Digital download	EP
Black Label XL	Released: 26 January 2015; Format: Digital download	Album
Black Label XL 2	Released: 20 July 2015; Format: Digital download	Album
Black Label XL 3	Released: 28 March 2016; Format: Digital download	Album
Black Label XXL	Released: 23 September 2016; Format: Digital download	Album
Black Friday Vol. 1	Released: 16 December 2016; Format: Digital download	EP
Black Ops I	Released: 21 December 2016; Format: Digital download	EP
Black Friday Vol. 2	Released: 13 January 2017; Format: Digital download	EP
Black Friday Vol. 3	Released: 10 February 2017; Format: Digital download	EP
Black Friday Vol. 4	Released: 10 March 2017; Format: Digital download	EP
Black Ops II	Released: 20 March 2017; Format: Digital download	EP
Black Friday Vol. 5	Released: 7 April 2017; Format: Digital download	EP
Black Friday Vol. 6	Released: 5 May 2017; Format: Digital download	EP
Black Friday Vol. 7	Released: 2 June 2017; Format: Digital download	EP
Black Friday Vol. 8	Released: 30 June 2017; Format: Digital download	EP
Black Friday Vol. 9	Released: 28 July 2017; Format: Digital download	EP
Black Friday Vol. 10	Released: 25 August 2017; Format: Digital download	EP
Black Friday Vol. 11	Released: 22 September 2017; Format: Digital download	EP
Black Label XL 4	Released: 25 September 2017; Format: Digital download	Album
Black Ops III	Released: 16 October 2017; Format: Digital download	EP
Black Friday Vol. 12	Released: 20 October 2017; Format: Digital download	EP
Black Friday Vol. 13	Released: 17 November 2017; Format: Digital download	EP
Black Friday Vol. 14	Released: 24 November 2017; Format: Digital download	EP
Black Friday Vol. 15	Released: 26 January 2018; Format: Digital download	EP
Black Friday Vol. 16	Released: 23 February 2018; Format: Digital download	EP
Black Friday Vol. 17	Released: 30 March 2018; Format: Digital download	EP
Black Friday Vol. 18	Released: 27 April 2018; Format: Digital download	EP
Black Friday Vol. 19	Released: 25 May 2018; Format: Digital download	EP
Black Friday Vol. 20	Released: 29 June 2018; Format: Digital download	EP
Black Friday Vol. 21	Released: 27 July 2018; Format: Digital download	EP
Black Ops XL	Released: 27 August 2018; Format: Digital download	Album
Black Friday Vol. 22	Released: 31 August 2018; Format: Digital download	EP
Black Friday Vol. 23	Released: 28 September 2018; Format: Digital download	EP
Black Label XL 5	Released: 22 October 2018; Format: Digital download	Album
Black Friday Vol. 24	Released: 26 October 2018; Format: Digital download	EP
Black Ops IV	Released: 28 January 2019; Format: Digital download	EP
Black Ops XL II	Released: 10 May 2019; Format: Digital download	Album
Black Label XL 6	Released: 9 August 2019; Format: Digital download	Album
Black Ops V	Released: 26 August 2019; Format: Digital download	EP
Black Label XL 7	Released: 25 September 2020; Format: Digital download	EP
Black Ops XL III	Released: 4 December 2020; Format: Digital download	Album

== See also ==
- List of record labels
- List of electronic music record labels
