= Sell Out (Marshmello and Svdden Death song) =

2019 song by Marshmello and Svdden Death

Single by Marshmello and Svdden Death
- Released: 8 February 2019
- Genre: Riddim
- Length: 3:12
- Label: Joytime Collective
- Producer(s): Christopher Comstock; Danny Howland

Marshmello singles chronology
"Biba" (2019)	"Sell Out" (2019)	"Here with Me" (2019)

Svdden Death singles chronology
"Bzzrk" (2018)	"Sell Out" (2019)	"Savceboys" (2019)

"Sell Out" is a song by American electronic music producer and DJ Marshmello and Los Angeles–based riddim producer Svdden Death. It was released on February 8, 2019 by Marshmello-owned American record label Joytime Collective/Geffen Records.

== Background and release ==
On January 24, 2018, Svdden Death tweeted that he had finished a studio session with Marshmello, exclaiming his own excitement for the songs' release. Marshmello later posted a short teaser of the collaboration on Twitter, with Svdden Death following suite on Instagram. The former announced the title of the song as "Sell Out", with an expected release date as February 8. Following the announcements, a promotional photo featuring Marshmello and Svdden Death pictured together in a mansion was released on several social media websites. The teaser was followed by reactions from both Svdden Death and Marshmello, with the latter commenting about how some people doubted his ability to make dubstep.

The song was released on February 8, 2019, as a digital download and on music streaming services by Marshmello's own record label Joytime Collective.

== Critical reception ==
"Sell Out" received mixed to negative reactions by critics. Christina Hernandez of Dancing Astronaut called the song neither original nor refreshing, commenting that it sounded like if it was "thrown together on Ableton in under an hour with immensely cookie-cutter construction" and felt like the song was "long removed" from the time when dubstep acts like Skream, Mt Eden and Rusko were prominent in the dubstep scene. Hernandez finalised her review by calling the song an "easy cop-out to increase variety and maintain Marshmello’s hold over the EDM world at large—though perhaps his next foray into bass lands better." Writing for Billboard, Kat Bein called the song one of the "hardest, grimiest, wompiest mess the candy king has ever been a part of", commenting that the song should have been more obvious with the mix of the sounds from both artists, later criticising the songs' composition as "a bit disjointed in practice."

Some critics were more favourable towards the song, with Run The Trap's Nick Isasi calling the song "outrageous", writing that the song "kicks off with a bubbly intro before unleashing an onslaught of straight riddim that will instantly have you craving for more." Surej Singh of Bandwagon described the song as a response to Marshmello's previous criticisms of selling out by making commercial songs with the likes of Selena Gomez and Bastille, describing the song as one that "begins with classic Mello-esque melodies transforms from a happy and breezy track to a brutal wall of bass and headbang-worthy drops." Writing for Your EDM, Matthew Meadow stated that the song sounds like an equal blend of both artists style, writing that the bridge and intro "lean more toward Mello’s sweet and innocent, melodic style, while the drop is definitely a heavier riddim influence", although he later noted that the song has no overarching melody and would likely not get much radio play.

== Track listing ==
Digital download – Single
No.	Title	Length
1.	"Sell Out"	3:12
Total length:		3:12

== Charts ==
Chart (2019)	Peak position
US Hot Dance/Electronic Songs (Billboard)	36

== Release history ==
Region	Date	Format	Label	Ref.
Various	February 8, 2019	Digital download	Joytime Collective	
