= Decisions (song) =

2012 single by Borgore featuring Miley Cyrus

"Decisions (Bitches Love Cake)"

Single by Borgore featuring Miley Cyrus

from the album Newgoreorder
- Released: July 10, 2012
- Genre: Dubstep
- Length: 3:13
- Songwriter: Asaf Borger
- Producer: Borgore

Miley Cyrus singles chronology
| "I'm Still Good" (2010) | "Decisions (Bitches Love Cake)" (2012) | "Ashtrays and Heartbreaks" (2013) |

Music video
- "Decisions" on YouTube

"Decisions (Bitches Love Cake)" is a 2012 song by Israeli record producer Borgore featuring American recording artist Miley Cyrus. It was independently released through online music stores on July 10, 2012, with its accompanying remixes extended play (EP); it was released as a stand-alone track on February 8, 2013. Cyrus' inclusion on the song was initially not publicized, with the intention of it making its own impact separate from her reputation, although Cyrus later confirmed the collaboration. "Decisions" is a dubstep track that lyrically discusses the general desire for wealth and success, frequently mentioned as "bitches love cake" during the track.

Upon its release, the track received generally favorable reviews from music critics, who appreciated Cyrus' inclusion and its diversity from her earlier works, but were ambivalent towards its overall production. An accompanying music video for the song was filmed in Los Angeles, California, and was released on November 1, 2012. The following month, Borgore and Cyrus performed the track at the Music Box in Los Angeles; Cyrus' provocative clothing and dancing with strippers garnered media attention. The original version failed to chart on any national record charts, although the parody "Hunger Games" by TheBajanCanadian peaked at number 38 on the U.S. Billboard Dance/Electronic Songs chart. It was released to Italian radio on July 29, 2013.

== Background and composition ==
"A lot of people in life become your friends, or have interest in being around you, because you're becoming successful, because the way you look, or because you got money -- or whatever you see as 'cake'."

— Borgore describing the meaning of "Decisions".

In 2012, Borgore stated that an extended play (EP) and studio album were under development, the latter of which he tentatively planned to release in 2013. After the release of her third studio album Can't Be Tamed (2010), Cyrus originally announced plans to focus on her film career, effectively putting her musical endeavors on hiatus. She was also confirmed as a primary voice actress in the feature film Hotel Transylvania, but dropped out of the project to coordinate a musical comeback in 2012. She had first hinted at developing a new sound after collaborating with hip hop recording artists Pharrell Williams and Tyler, the Creator.

When discussing his collaboration with Cyrus, Borgore stated that "you have to understand that I grew up in Israel, and the whole Hannah Montana thing, I've never seen it. I've heard about this, but the Miley Cyrus persona you might have in America I don't have." Her involvement with "Decisions" was originally not publicly acknowledged in an attempt to "make a tune together that we're super happy about and just see people's real opinion about this." However, Cyrus unexpectedly tweeted "Yo check out Decisions me & @borgore new track" in August 2012, which Borgore commented was "super cool [that] she did it the way she did it". He added that he was impressed with her vocal abilities, elaborating that, "I thought she was made up more to be a star, but she was pretty phenomenal behind the booth."

"Decisions" is marked a musical departure from Cyrus' earlier catalog and following the increasingly popular trend towards dance music. Lyrically, Borgore stated that "the very literal meaning of the song is how much girls love eating cake but the subliminal message is how people are attracted to money and power, and in order to succeed in life you need to work hard and attract those people that are there for the right reasons". The line "bitches love cake" is repeatedly heard throughout the track; Andy Hermann from DJZ interpreted the term "bitches" to be referring to "all superficial groupies who feed off of the success, beauty, and wealth of others."

Borgore performed "Decisions" at the Music Box in Los Angeles on December 10, 2012. He had previously announced an appearance from a special guest, which was later revealed to be Cyrus. Jocelyn Vena from MTV News described it as "what might be one of her most risqué performances", having worn sexually-suggestive clothing and provocatively danced with a topless woman. In December 2013, TheBajanCanadian released a parody of "Decisions", renamed "Kings of the Hunger Games", to the iTunes Store. Its lyrics are reworked to reference The Hunger Games film series. The song charted at number 38 on the U.S. Billboard Dance/Electronic Songs component chart to the flagship Billboard Hot 100, with sales of 5,000 copies during the week of January 3, 2014.

== Critical reception ==
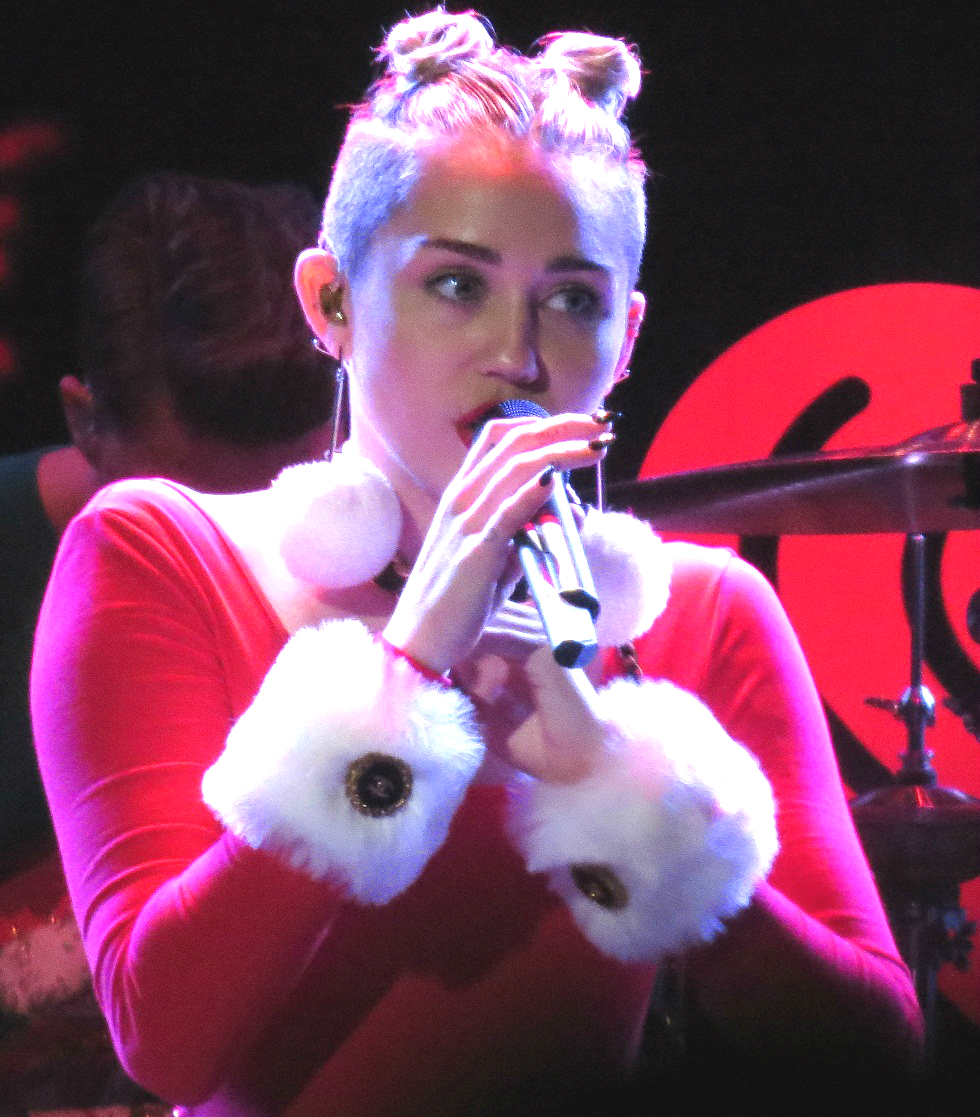
Critics spoke favorably of Cyrus' (pictured) background vocal performance.

Upon its release, "Decisions" received generally favorable reviews from music critics, who appreciated Cyrus' inclusion and its diversity from her earlier works, but were ambivalent towards its overall production. Writing for Gurl, Jessica Sager spoke favorably of Cyrus' background vocal delivery, and called it "a far cry from "Party in the U.S.A.", but it’s still pretty awesome." Jenna Hally Rubenstein from MTV Buzzworthy shared a similar sentiment; despite being disappointed with Cyrus' limited appearance on the track, Rubenstein complimented that "cool element of melodic lushness" that her voice provided. Matt Oliver of OC Weekly opined that "having [Cyrus] sing on a dubstep track is impressive", and felt that it did not come across in the "pop gimmick" fashion that Justin Bieber's EDM-inspired track "As Long as You Love Me" appeared to.

Amy Sciarretto of PopCrush called the overall track "catchy" and described the cake metaphor mentioned throughout the song to be "hilarious". However, Kia Makarechi from The Huffington Post provided a more mixed review of "Decisions", feeling that it was "neither particularly inventive nor that cathartic". Writing for YourEDM, Elliot Sachs was disappointed that Cyrus' vocals came across as "faint and minuscule in comparison to all the brouhaha that is going on at the same time." In February 2014, Chris Wood from YourEDM noted that "Decisions" became an "interesting pivot point" in Borgore's career, which "pushed [him] into the early stages of a pop icon within electronic music scene".

== Music video ==
An accompanying music video for "Decisions" was directed by Christian Lamb, and was filmed at Beacher's Madhouse in Los Angeles, California. The final product was premiered through Borgore's YouTube channel on November 1, 2012. The clip begins with in Venice Beach, where Borgore is seen bringing a large cake to an upscale party in Hollywood. Several people are seen dressed in costumes and throwing pieces of cake at one another, while Cyrus is later revealed to have been hiding in the cake. She also makes out with her then-fiancé Liam Hemsworth, who appears dressed as a unicorn. Borgore's ex-girlfriend, pornographic actress Jessie Andrews, is also featured in the video. Nate Jones from Popdust though that its entire concept was "very confusing", but said he "still wouldn’t mind hanging out in it for a while. Hillary Buss from Entertainment Weekly was surprised that Cyrus was involved in the project, stating that "if you had told me five years ago that Miley Cyrus would one day be featured on an Israeli DJ’s dubstep track, I would have scoffed and replied, 'Hannah Montana? Are you serious? Also, what’s dubstep?'"

== Track listings ==
"Decisions" – Digital download
| No. | Title | Length |
|---|---|---|
| 1. | "Decisions" (featuring Miley Cyrus) | 3:14 |
| Total length: | | 3:14 |

"Decisions" – Remixes EP
| No. | Title | Length |
|---|---|---|
| 1. | "Decisions" (featuring Miley Cyrus) | 3:14 |
| 2. | "Decisions" (Document One Remix) | 6:00 |
| 3. | "Decisions" (Thomas Sagstad Remix) | 5:30 |
| 4. | "Decisions" (Cedric Gervais Remix) | 5:46 |
| 5. | "Decisions" (Dead Audio Remix) | 4:12 |
| Total length: | | 24:42 |

== Release history ==
| Country | Date | Version | Format | Ref. |
|---|---|---|---|---|
| United States | July 10, 2012 | Remix EP | Digital download | |
| United States | February 8, 2013 | Single | Digital download | |
