= Destroid =

Dubstep supergroup

- Origin: Kelowna, British Columbia, Canada
- Genres: Live dubstep, dubstep, drum & bass, metalstep, drumstep
- Years active: 2012–2017
- Labels: Destroid Music, Firepower Records
- Past members: Excision; Downlink; KJ Sawka

Destroid were a dubstep supergroup and live dubstep band consisting of Excision (production and midi-guitars), Downlink (production and midi-guitars), and Pendulum drummer KJ Sawka, with collaboration from Space Laces and Ajapai. The band released two singles and two albums on their independent label, Destroid Music. Destroid also performed live music shows.

Destroid promoted their dubstep music with online videos, social media marketing, and online graphic novels and a web page called "The Elevated", using the tagline "elevate your existence".

== Timeline ==
Destroid was formed after several years of Excision's North American tours, as well as collaborations with Downlink for nu-metal band Korn. Excision and Downlink began work on the initial music production for Destroid, and then enlisted Pendulum's KJ Sawka to round out the line up.

In October 2012, Excision released his Shambhala 2012 DJ mix which included six Destroid songs. To promote the release, a video, The Destroid Existence Conspiracy, was created by videographer Mike Diva. The group also published on their website an eight-page graphic novel; the plot parallels events depicted in the Destroid Existence Conspiracy video. The artwork for the graphic novel was created by Steven Juliano; it was written and directed by Devin Taylor, and the cover artwork is credited to both Juliano and Taylor.

Destroid's first single, "Raise Your Fist", was released on November 15, 2012, as a free download on the band's website using a "pay with a tweet" promotion that gave fans a free MP3 in exchange for sharing the link on their Twitter or Facebook page.

On November 30, 2012, "Raise Your Fist" was released on Beatport.com and iTunes, reaching #2 on Beatport's Top Dubstep 100 Chart, and #90 on the Top 100 overall chart.

In 2013, Destroid released an album, The Invasion.

Destroid's live show premiered on May 31, 2013, in San Francisco at The Warfield. That year, the band also performed in Baltimore at the Moonrise Festival, Detroit; at the Orion Festival, New Jersey; at Electric Adventure Festival within Six Flags Great Adventure; and just outside Albany, New York, at Camp Bisco 12 (2013).

In 2014, Destroid released a follow-up album, The Invasion Remixes. Also that year, the band performed at the Safe in Sound Festival.

In 2016, the group performed at the Ultra Music Festival in Miami, Florida.

In September 2017, the group performed at Excision's first music festival, Lost Lands in Ohio. During the set, one of the two volcanos by the stage caught fire, resulting in the stage to be temporarily shut down. This was not the first time Excision has had a stage of his catch fire. This was also Destroid's final music performance.

On May 31, 2018, "Destroid 8 Annihilate" was included in the action rhythm game Just Shapes & Beats.

== Discography ==
=== Studio albums ===
- The Invasion (2013)

=== Compilation albums ===
- The Invasion Remixes (2014)

=== Singles ===
- "Destroid 1. Raise Your Fist" - Produced by Excision, Downlink, Space Laces - Destroid Music - November 30, 2012
- "Destroid 9. Blast Off" - Produced by Excision, Ajapai - Destroid Music - January 21, 2013
- "Destroid 11. Get Stupid" - Produced by Excision, Space Laces - Destroid Music - November 26, 2013

Songs appearing on the Excision Shambhala 2012 mix:

- "Destroid 1. Raise Your Fist" - Produced by Excision, Downlink, Space Laces
- "Destroid 2. Wasteland" - Produced by Excision, Downlink, Space Laces
- "Destroid 3. Crusaders" - Produced by Excision, Downlink, Space Laces
- "Destroid 4. Flip The Switch" - Produced by Excision
- "Destroid 5. Activation" - Produced by Downlink
- "Destroid 6. Put It Down" - Produced by Excision & Bassnectar
- "Destroid 7. Bounce" - Produced by Excision & Space Laces
- "Destroid 8. Annihilate" - Produced by Excision & Far Too Loud
