= Jauz =

American DJ and record producer (born 1993)

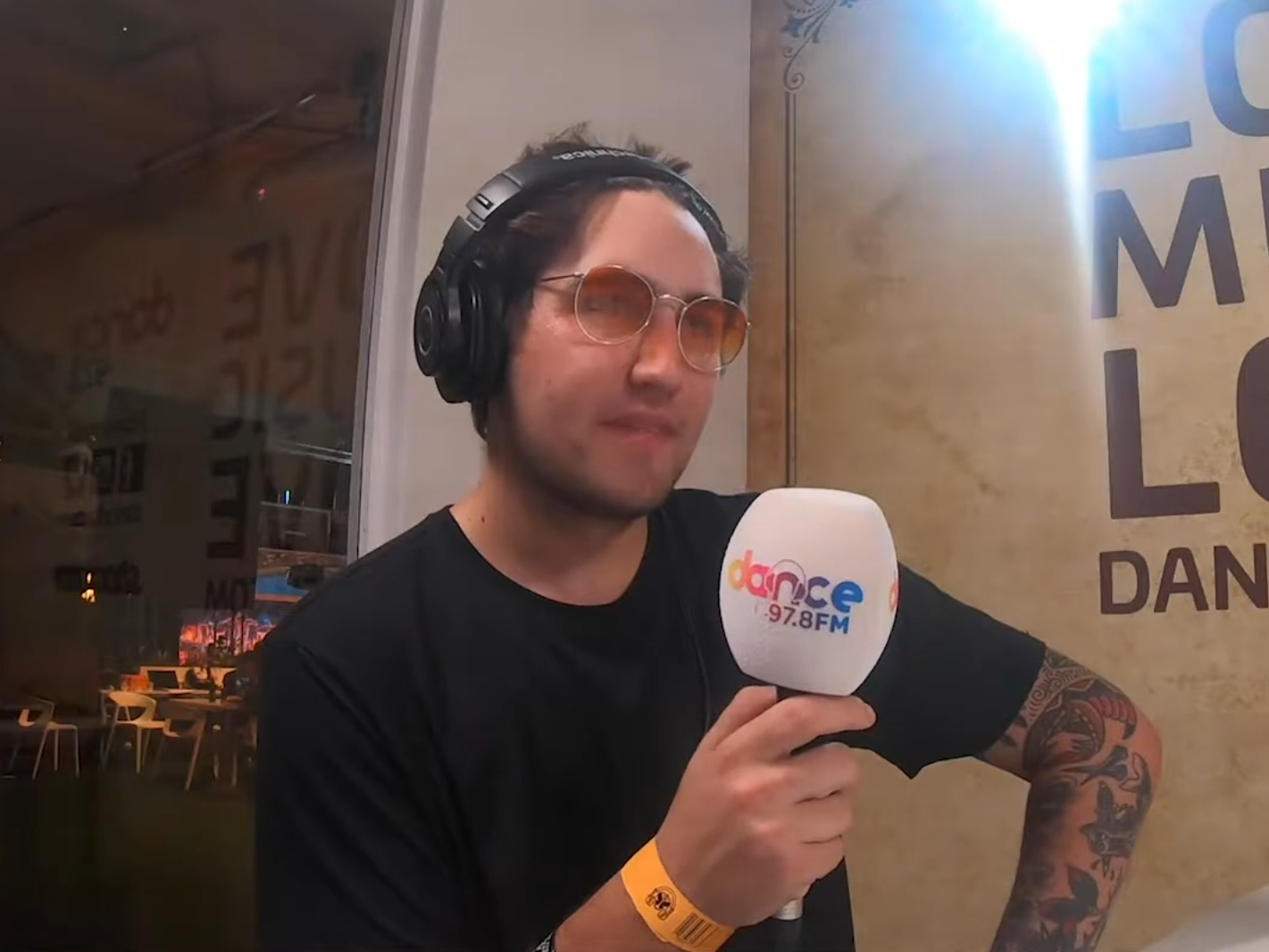
- Jauz in 2019

Background information
- Born: Samuel Reed Vogel; September 2, 1993 (age 33); San Francisco, California, U.S.
- Origin: Mill Valley, California, U.S.
- Genres: Trap; bass house; dubstep; EDM; future bass
- Occupations: DJ; record producer
- Years active: 2013–2026-hiatus
- Labels: Bite This; Mad Decent; Spinnin'; Monstercat; Buygore
- Website: jauzofficial.com

Samuel Reed Vogel (born September 2, 1993) also known by his stage name Jauz (/dʒɔːz/ JAW-z), is an American DJ and electronic music producer. He founded his own record label, Bite This, in 2017.

== Early life ==
Vogel grew up in Mill Valley, California. He began playing guitar and producing electronic music on his computer at the age of 15. He went to Icon Collective music production school. He previously went to a film school in Loyola Marymount University where he joined Kappa Sigma before deciding to pursue a musical career, prompting him to enroll in Icon Collective. He began releasing future house tracks before adopting the stage name Jauz. His career kickstarted when fellow musician Kennedy Jones had played one of his remixes. Jones also had introduced him to his manager, Moe Shalizi which helped Vogel to release music on Borgore's record label, Buygore.

== Career ==
=== 2013 ===
Before starting his professional career, he used "Escape Dubstep" as a stage name. He later used 'Jauz' because he thought it was short, simple and catchy despite hating the word. The name was also described by Vogel as a slang word for 'bullshit' and a liar. He started his career by uploading remixes. His songs caught the attention of well-known DJs such as Diplo, Skrillex and Borgore.

=== 2014 ===
He released the single "Feel the Volume" via Diplo's record label, Mad Decent.

=== 2015 ===
He collaborated with Skrillex to release the single "Squad Out!" as part of a program. He also released songs on Monstercat and Spinnin' Records. In December 2016, he collaborated with Diplo to remix MØ's song, "Final Song".

=== 2017 ===
Jauz performing in 2017

In 2017, he released singles "Claim to Be", "The Game", "I Hold Still", "Alpha" and "Ghost".

He also founded the record label Bite This on November 6, 2017.

His release "Meant To Love You (ft. Rouxn)" still was able to have a taste on the Billboard Charts attaining a no.19 peak on Dance Mix/Show Airplay.

=== 2018 ===
2018 was projectly centered about his album effort The Wise and the Wicked with single efforts "Gassed Up (with DJ Snake)" and "Diamonds (with Kiiara)." Other notable tracks from the album that may proceed as some accountable hits include "Frequency (with Adventure Club and Kyle Pavone)," "In The Zone (ft. Example)," and "Soldier (with Krewella)."

=== 2023 ===
In 2023, Jauz released his Rise Of The Wise album project, with lead single "Lights Go Out" peaking at no.17 on Billboard's Dance Mix/Show Airplay, making his currently highest attained peak on the chart from the album effort and his whole career so far.

== Musical style ==
Vogel produces chill trap, bass house and dubstep. He also incorporates heavy bass sounds similar to the styles in the 80s and 90s. Vogel uses Ableton as his digital audio workstation.

== Discography ==
- The Wise and the Wicked (2018)
- Rise of the Wise (2023)

== Singles ==
- "Rock the Party (with Ephwurd)" (2015)
- "Deeper Love" (2015)
- "Get Down (with Eptic)" (2016)
- "Magic (with Marshmello)" (2016)
- "Meant to Love You (ft. Rouxn)" (2017)
- "Oceans & Galaxies (with Haliene)" (2021)
- "Mercy (with Masked Wolf)" (2022)
