= Excision (musician) =

Canadian dubstep producer

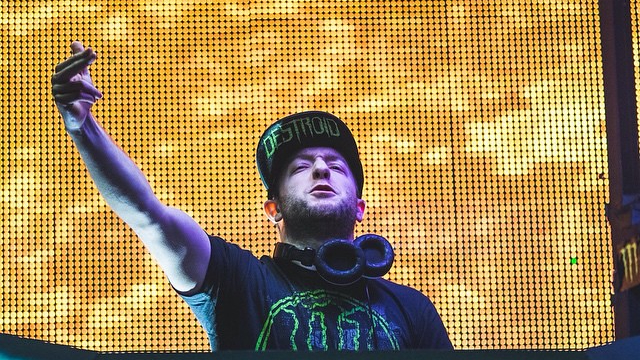
- Excision in 2015

Background information
- Born: Jeffrey Travis Abel; 29 April 1986 (age 40)
- Origin: Kelowna, British Columbia, Canada
- Genres: Dubstep; drum and bass; drumstep; trap; glitch hop; riddim
- Occupations: Music producer; DJ; performer
- Instruments: Digital audio workstation (FL Studio), Pioneer DJ
- Years active: 2006–present
- Labels: Astralwerks; Circus; Cyclops Recordings; Destroid Music; EX7; Excision Music; mau5trap; Monstercat; Never Say Die; Rottun Recordings; SubCarbon Records; Subsidia
- Website: excision.ca

Jeffrey Travis "Jeff" Abel (born 29 April 1986), better known by his stage name Excision, is a Canadian DJ and electronic dance music producer. He is the founder of Rottun Recordings and Subsidia Records. Active since 2006, his first release, "Warning", was in 2007. He released an annual "Shambhala" mix album in the third quarter of each year until 2016. He started his own music festival (Lost Lands) the following year and releases annual mixes. He is known for his tours with immense sound systems and huge visual productions.

Abel founded the record label Destroid Music. Upon its debut, Destroid released a full-length digital album titled The Invasion. The majority of tracks on the album were produced by Excision, with collaborations with other artists such as Downlink, Space Laces, Far Too Loud, Bassnectar and Ajapai. He was also part of Destroid, a dubstep supergroup and Ableton Live band alongside Downlink and KJ Sawka.

== Career ==
Abel released his first mix in 2006 titled "Darkside Dubstep", and his second mix "Ruttun Dubstep" in 2007, both consisting of various dubstep songs. Abel released his first Shambhala Mix in 2008, also compilation of dubstep songs. In 2009, Abel released his first EP titled Boom on his own label, Rottun Recordings.

In 2010, Abel released the single with DJ/Producer Downlink titled "Heavy Artillery" with rapper Messinian, which also followed up to another song which was "Reploid" featuring Downlink.

In May 2011, Abel released a Downlink collaboration EP titled Existence. In November of the same year, Abel released his debut studio album X Rated on Deadmau5's record label Mau5trap. The album's release was supported by the North American "X Tour" with Liquid Stranger and Lucky Date, in early 2012, and around that time, the debut remix version of the album X Rated titled, X Rated: The Remixes, was released in September 2012. He also formed the dubstep super group, Destroid, consisting of members Downlink and KJ Sawka. The group released their debut album, The Invasion which was released in May 2013. They also released their first single, "Destroid 11. Get Stupid" featuring Space Laces.

In January 2013, Excision unveiled the "Executioner" stage. It was a 28 ft wide, 15 ft tall, stage structure with video projection mapping and 40 lasers. He took this production on a 4-month tour of North America, with support from Vaski and Paper Diamond.

On 15 November 2013, Excision unveiled a 100,000-watt sound system at the 1st Bank Center in Broomfield Colorado for the Boomfest event. The event included a back-to-back set from Funtcase and Cookie Monsta along with Deltron 3030, Brillz, ill.Gates and Colorado locals, Robotic Pirate Monkey.

Starting in January 2014, Excision began a new tour covering North America with support from Dirtyphonics and ill.Gates. This new tour featured his "Executioner" video and light production. This time, he brought a 150,000-watt sound system from PK Sound.

In 2015, Excision released his second studio album Codename X on his own label Rottun Recordings.

2016 saw the debut of a new tour and production system, "The Paradox". The new production system made its way across North America selling out venues with the support of Bear Grillz and Figure on most dates.

On 25 October 2016, Excision released his third studio album, Virus, on Rottun Records. Virus contained 16 songs and collaborations with artists including Dion Timmer, Space Laces, Protohype, and others.

On 14 August 2018, Excision released his fourth studio album, Apex. The album took two years to make and it contains 14 songs and collaborations with artists including Dion Timmer, Sullivan King, Space Laces, Illenium and others. Excision stated that the album is a celebration of all he's accomplished in his career.

In June 2019, he announced an upcoming EP with Dutch producer Dion Timmer. This collab EP, named Breaking Through, was released on the 22 June.

In September, he announced another EP with American dubstep producer Wooli. It was named Evolution EP and released on 13 September with Seven Lions's single Another Me.

In November, after more than three years of The Paradox, Abel announced his new audio/visual concept show titled "The Evolution" along with a double-header show he called "The Thunderdome." The new production debuted on 31 January and lasted until 1 February 2020 in Tacoma Dome, Washington. The production was inevitably cut short due to COVID-19.

In 2020, Abel released his second collaboration with Illenium, titled "Feel Something". The song featured the American metalcore band I Prevail. He also followed up by another single with Downlink, his first collaboration with him after 3 years, titled "Resistance".

In September 2020, Excision announced his new record label, Subsidia Records, and launched three compilations consisting of 118 bass songs, ranging from Experimental Bass, Melodic Bass and Heavy Bass. He also released a one-and-a-half-hour long mix from his Lost Lands: Couch Lands livestream, titled Excision Subsidia Mix 2020, along with three new singles, "Necromancer" with Dion Timmer, "Demise" with PhaseOne, and "Erase You" with Wooli and HALIENE. Subsidia was named best record label of 2020 by edm.com

In 2021, Excision hosted a 2-day event at Legend Valley called Reunion. Followed by the return of Bass Canyon in August and Lost Lands in September.

In January 2022, Excision released his 5th full-length studio album titled Onyx. Onyx has 17 tracks featuring a mix of Excision original songs and collaborations with other artists.

== Festivals ==
In 2017, Excision announced the inaugural year of his own dinosaur-themed music festival, Lost Lands. Lost Lands took place at Legend Valley, Ohio 29 September through 1 October 2017. The lineup consisted of many of the top bass music DJs including Excision, Seven Lions, Rezz, Zeds Dead, 12th Planet, Destroid, Kill The Noise, and many more.

On 15 March 2018, following the success of the inaugural Lost Lands, Excision announced a west coast version of the festival, Bass Canyon, to be held 24–26 August 2018 at The Gorge Amphitheatre in George, Washington. Like Lost Lands, Bass Canyon began as a yearly camping festival featuring top bass music producers. In 2018, artists included Excision, Zomboy, NGHTMRE, Liquid Stranger, 12th Planet, and many more.

Excision then announced, on 1 August 2021, Paradise Blue, an all-inclusive destination festival that first took place at the Paradisus resort in Cancún, Mexico on 29 April to 1 May 2022.

== Discography ==
Studio albums

- X Rated (2011)
- Codename X (2015)
- Virus (2016)
- Apex (2018)
- Onyx (2022)
- Subsidia vol 8 (2023)

== Achievements ==
"Destroid 1 Raise Your Fist" peaked at number 50 on the Billboard Dance/Electronic Songs chart on 10 August 2013.

Awarded for Best Dubstep Track at the 2012 first annual DMA's (Dubstep Music Awards).
