= Eptic =

Belgian DJ (b. 1993)

Background information
- Born: Michaël Bella; 9 April 1993 (age 33); Waasmunster, Belgium
- Origin: Belgium
- Genre: Dubstep
- Occupations: Record producer, DJ
- Years active: 2008–present
- Labels: Never Say Die; Ministry of Sound; Chronos; Mau5trap; Astrofonik; Radar; Spinnin'; Monstercat
- Website: epticofficial.com

Michaël Bella (born 9 April 1993), known by his stage name Eptic, is a Belgian DJ and record producer. He is most known for his extended play Overlord, which peaked at 22 on Billboard's Top Dance/Electronic Albums chart.

Eptic began his career as a DJ at age 19. He gained notoriety in the dubstep scene after the release of his extended play Like a Boss, released on Never Say Die Records in 2012. Since then, he has collaborated with artists such as Habstrakt, DJ Snake, Valentino Khan, Jauz, and Dillon Francis.

== Discography ==
=== Albums ===
Title	Album details
The End of the World	Released: 15 April 2022; Label: Overlord Music

=== Extended plays ===
Title	Album details	Peak chart positions
Title	Album details	US Dance
Eptic	Released: 24 October 2011; Label: Chronos Records	—
Like a Boss	Released: 1 May 2012; Label: Never Say Die Records	—
Slime City	Released: 6 August 2012; Label: Never Say Die Records	—
Mastermind	Released: 6 May 2013; Label: Never Say Die Records	—
Doom	Released: 18 November 2013; Label: Never Say Die Records	—
The End	Released: 27 October 2014; Label: Never Say Die Records	—
Immortal	Released: 7 July 2015; Label: Never Say Die Records	—
Overlord	Released: 24 June 2016; Label: Never Say Die Records	22
Anti-Human	Released: 22 June 2018; Label: Never Say Die Records	—
Flesh & Blood	Released: 19 September 2019; Label: Monstercat	—
Darkstar	Released: 30 April 2025; Label: Overlord Music / Create Music Inc.	—
"—" denotes a recording that did not chart

=== Singles ===
Title	Year	Album
"Brainstorm"	2014	Non-album singles
"On the Block" (with Habstrakt)	2015	Non-album singles
"Get Down" (with Jauz)	2016	Non-album singles
"Swords & Dragons"	2016	Overlord
"Eat My Dust"	2017	Non-album single
"Let It Go" (with Dillon Francis)	2019	Flesh & Blood
"Power"	2019	Flesh & Blood
"Propane"	2020	Non-album singles
"Stop Pretending"	2021	Non-album singles
"Shadow People"	2021	Non-album singles
"Payback"	2021	Non-album singles
"Hitta" (with Marshmello and Juicy J)	2021	Shockwave (Marshmello)
"Nosebleed" (with Peekaboo)	2021	Non-album singles
"Bloodbath" (with Valentino Khan and Lil Jon)	2022	pkg (Valentino Khan)
"Wall of Death" (with Marauda)	2022	The End of the World
"Skill Check" (with Must Die!)	2022	The End of the World
"Tactix" (with Joey Valence & Brae)	2023	Non-album singles
"Witchcraft"	2023	Non-album singles
"Cyberhell"	2024	Non-album singles
"Moon Vision" (with UBUR and Neonix)	2024	Non-album singles
"Light Up" (with LYNY)	2025	Darkstar
"Alone" (with Habstrakt)	2025	Darkstar
"Crash Out" (with Space Laces)	2025	Darkstar

=== Other charted songs ===
Title	Year	Peak chart positions
Title	Year	US Dance
SouthSide (with DJ Snake)	2019	40
