= Snails (DJ) =

Canadian DJ and music producer (1988)

Background information
- Also known as: Slugz; Escargot; Dooze Jackers
- Born: Frédérik Durand; 4 May 1988 (age 38)
- Origin: Sainte-Émélie-de-l'Énergie, Quebec, Canada
- Genres: House; Dubstep; Vomitstep; Trap
- Occupations: Electronic musician, DJ
- Instrument: Digital audio workstation (Reason)
- Years active: 2012–present
- Labels: Slugz Music; Owsla; Kannibalen; Monstercat
- Website: officialsnails.com

Frédérik Durand (born 4 May 1988), professionally known as SNAILS, is a DJ and music producer from Montreal, Canada.

Durand's musical style has been described as "vomitstep", featuring "guttural bass gurgles, crushing 808s and synthesizers oscillated well past the point of absurdity" according to Billboard.

In March 2024 Durand was awarded $1.5 million in an Alberta defamation lawsuit for false accusations of sexual assault by Michaela Higgins, a resident of California who had never met him.

== Career ==
=== 2012–2016: Early career ===
Durand's first tracks, including his debut release "Bubble Gun", appeared online in 2012 through Canadian label Kannibalen Records. He began collaborating with artists such as Flux Pavilion and Jack Ü and had frequent plays from Skrillex and other notable DJs. In 2014, Snails released two singles, "Wild" and "Pump This", and made his first US concert appearances. In 2015, Durand performed at EDC Las Vegas, Ultra Music Festival and Electric Forest, and released a single titled "King Is Back". He continued releasing music through multiple labels, including several releases on Skrillex's Owsla imprint.

=== 2016–2020: Tours ===
In early 2016, Durand embarked on the North American Enter Slugz City Tour as direct support for Flosstradamus, as well as playing festival sets at Coachella, Lollapalooza and Ultra Music Festival. Durand also briefly toured Asia, performing at numerous venues and festivals in China, Japan, and Taiwan. To close out 2016, Durand toured through Australia with Jauz and Slushii on the Touch Bass traveling festival. The final Snails show of 2016 took place in Denver, Colorado at Decadence Music Festival. He hosted his own festival, Sluggtopia, at Red Rocks in October 2017.

In May 2017, Durand and Botnek collaborated on a single "Waffle House" released on Owsla, with an accompanying music video. On 29 August 2017, Snails released the song "Into the Light", and on October 20, 2017, he released his album titled The Shell. Through 2020 he was performing 125 to 150 club nights a year.

=== 2020–present ===
In 2020 an Instagram account began posting accusations of serious sexual impropriety. His income dropped from close to $3 million in 2018 to a loss of $138,000 in 2022. In 2023, he performed 15 shows. In March 2024, he won a $1.5 million defamation judgement passed by Justice Nicholas Devlin against his accuser in Alberta court.

== Discography ==
=== Albums ===
- 2017: The Shell
- 2018: Slimeageddon
- 2022: Helix

=== Extended plays ===
- 2019 World of Slime

=== Singles ===
- 2015: "Pump This" (with Herobust)
- 2016: "Deep In The Night" (with Pegboard Nerds)
- 2017: "The Serpant" (with KSHMR)
- 2018: "Snailephant" (with Wooli)
- 2018: "Follow Me" (with Adventure Club featuring Sara Diamond)
- 2019: "Jackhammer" (with Krimer)
- 2019: "RKO" (featuring Rico Act)
- 2019: "Snailclops" (with Subtronics)
- 2021: "Slime Zone"

=== Remixes ===
- 2021: Hi I'm Ghost — "Death Rail" (Snails Slime Rail Remix)
