= KJ Sawka =

- KJ Sawka in 2023

Background information
- Born: Kevin Joseph Sawka; October 10, 1977 (age 48); Seattle, Washington, U.S.
- Genres: Drum and bass, dubstep, oldschool jungle
- Occupations: Musician, record producer, DJ
- Instruments: Drums, keyboards, bass guitar, percussion
- Years active: 2005–present
- Labels: Black Hole Recordings, Wax Orchard, Beat My Drum Recordings, Impossible Records
- Spouse: Cori Carlson
- Website: kjsawka.com

Kevin Joseph "KJ" Sawka is an American musician, record producer, and DJ. He plays drums in the bands Pendulum, Destroid and All Fires.

== Career ==
KJ Sawka started his musical career at the age of twelve. At age eighteen, he developed an interest in electronic music and started producing. Citing the drumming of Phil Collins as a major influence, Sawka uses a customized drumkit configured to enable greater improvisation, tailored to the type of music he is playing.

In 2010, he became the drummer of Pendulum as the sole American member, appearing on their Immersion album. The group reunited in 2016 for a single live show at Ultra Music Festival, Miami, and subsequently went on tour in 2017.

In 2012, together with producers Excision and Downlink, Sawka founded the supergroup Destroid, of which he is the drummer. He founded the independent record label Impossible Records in 2015.

In 2021, Sawka reunited with friend and collaborator, Blake Lewis, to form the group, "The Private Language". Their first single, a cover of the Tears for Fears classic, "Everybody Wants to Rule the World" was released on Black Hole Recordings and was shortly followed up by the release of their second single, "Cali Girls".

== Discography ==
=== Solo ===
Studio albums

- 2005 – Synchronized Decompression
- 2007 – Cyclonic Steel
- 2009 – Undefined Connectivity

Live albums

- 2008 – Live at Chop Suey

=== With Pendulum ===
- 2010 – Immersion
- 2025 - Inertia

=== With Destroid ===
- 2013 – The Invasion
- 2014 – The Invasion Remixes
