= Borgore =

Israeli DJ and record producer (born 1987)

Borgore יוסף אסף בורגר
- Born: Yosef Asaf Borger; 20 October 1987 (age 38)
- Origin: Holon, Israel
- Genres: Dubstep; trap; big room house; electro house; heavy metal; death metal; deathcore; metalcore; electronic rock; jazz
- Occupations: Record producer; DJ; rapper; singer-songwriter
- Instruments: Turntables; vocals; drums; piano; saxophone; synthesizer
- Years active: 2007–present
- Labels: Buygore; Dim Mak; Spinnin'; Sumerian; Armada
- Website: Borgore

Yosef Asaf Borger (Hebrew: יוסף אסף בורגר; born 20 October 1987), known professionally as Borgore, is an Israeli EDM producer, DJ, singer-songwriter and rapper. He is the founder of the label Buygore Records.

== Biography ==
=== Personal life ===
Yosef Asaf Borger was born to a Jewish family in Holon, Israel, and was raised in Tel Aviv. He has a brother named Tax. Borger moved to Los Angeles in 2012. Borger returned to Israel in November 2023, shortly after the birth of his daughter, Ellie and now lives in Hungary with his family.

=== Career ===
He is the founder of Buygore Records and is the former drummer of Israeli deathcore band Shabira. Self-described as "Gorestep", his music includes triplet drum patterns with heavy metal influences. Songs have been sonically suggestive of horror movies, farm animal vocalizations, and sex. He has released tracks under Dim Mak Records, Spinnin' Records, Sumerian Records, Shift Recordings, and his own label, Buygore. In 2012, he released the single, Decisions, with backing vocals provided by Miley Cyrus.

== Discography ==
=== Studio albums ===
- #Newgoreorder (8 July 2014; Buygore / Dim Mak Records)
- The Art Of Gore (27 September 2019; Buygore)
- CHIAROSCURO (29 March 2024; Buygore)

=== Extended plays ===
- Gorestep: Vol. 1 (2009; Shift Recordings)
- Borgore Ruined Dubstep, Pt. 1 (2010; Buygore)
- Borgore Ruined Dubstep, Pt. 2 (2010; Buygore)
- Delicious (6 June 2011; Buygore)
- Flex (5 March 2012; Buygore)
- Decisions (18 June 2012; Buygore)
- Turn Up (8 October 2012; Buygore)
- Legend (7 June 2013; Buygore)
- Wild Out (12 November 2013; Dim Mak Records)
- The Buygore Album (13 January 2015; Buygore)
- Keep It Sexy (4 October 2015; Buygore)
- Adventures in Time (9 May 2018; Buygore)
- The Firest (12 October 2018; Buygore)
- Slaughterhouse (3 December 2021; Buygore)

=== Mixtapes ===
- Buygore Mixtape, Vol. 1 (3 April 2020; Buygore)

=== Singles ===
- "Birthday and The Black November / Ambient Dub Shit" (2010; Audio Freaks)
- "Ice Cream "12" (2010; Trillbass Records)
- "Decisions" (featuring Miley Cyrus) (10 July 2012; Buygore)
- "Incredible" (w/ Carnage) (4 February 2013; Spinnin' Records)
- "Deception" (w/ Cedric Gervais) (18 March 2013; Spinnin' Records)
- "Macarena" (w/ Kennedy Jones) (April 2013; Buygore)
- "That Lean" (featuring Carnage & DEV) (1 May 2013; Buygore)
- "Wayak" (w/ Dudu Tassa) (12 November 2013; Dim Mak Records)
- "Wild Out" (featuring Waka Flocka Flame and Paige) (15 October 2013; Dim Mak Records)
- "Illuminati" (w/ Shaygray) (4 April 2014; Dim Mak Records)
- "Unicorn Zombie Apocalypse" (w/ Sikdope) (14 April 2014; Spinnin' Records)
- "Ratchet" (27 May 2014; Dim Mak Records)
- "School Daze" (w/ Addison) (11 May 2015; Armada Music)
- "Forbes" (featuring G-Eazy) (4 September 2015; Buygore)
- "Blast Ya" (featuring Barrington Levy) (1 April 2016; Buygore)
- "100s" (10 June 2016; Buygore)
- "Daddy" (15 September 2016; Buygore)
- "Best" (4 November 2016; Buygore/Armada Music)
- "Magic Trick" (featuring Juicy J) (9 December 2016; Buygore)
- "Harder" (17 February 2017; Buygore)
- "Big Bad" (3 March 2017; Buygore)
- "Help" (20 April 2017; Buygore)
- "Domino" (featuring Mad Cobra) (2 June 2017; Buygore)
- "Savages" (4 August 2017; Armada Music)
- "Blasphemy" (20 October 2017; Buygore)
- "Salad Dressing" (featuring Bella Thorne) (3 November 2017; Buygore)
- "Coco Puffs" (19 January 2018; Buygore)
- "Svddengore" (featuring Svdden Death) (16 February 2018; Buygore)
- "Freak" (with Gentlemen's Club featuring Watson) (23 February 2018; Buygore)
- "B.Y.D." (with Benda) (2 March 2018; Buygore)
- "Reasons" (with Axel Boy featuring GG MAGREE) (9 March 2018; Buygore)
- "Jimmy's Rage" (with AFK) (16 March 2018; Buygore)
- "Elefante" (27 July 2018; Spinnin' Records)
- "Mop" (featuring Gucci Mane and Thirty Rack) (21 September 2018; Buygore)
- "Camo Diamond Rollie" (with Benda) (1 February 2019; Bassrush)
- "Gore on the Dancefloor" (with Moonboy featuring Rico Act) (17 May 2019; Buygore)
- "Summerlake" (28 June 2019; Buygore)
- "911" (featuring Abella Danger) (19 July 2019; Buygore)
- "Petty" (6 September 2019; Buygore)
- "Tetris" (13 September 2019; Buygore)
- "Forever in My Debt"(featuring Tommy Cash) (20 September 2019; Buygore)
- "RFG" (20 December 2019; Buygore)
- "Ratatata" (with Etc!Etc! and Snc) (17 March 2020; Buygore)
- "Basketball" (with Karetus and Zanova) (29 May 2020; Buygore)
- "Self Destruction" (with Diablo and Killstation) (12 June 2020; Foolish Cult / Empire)
- "Snake Shot" (with Benda) (24 July 2020; Buygore)
- "Sweet Dreams" (with Wodd) (28 August 2020; Buygore)
- "Sad B*tch" (with Tima Dee) (11 December 2020; Buygore)
- "Rockstar Sh*t" (with T-Wayne) (10 September 2021; Buygore)
- "I Don't Care" (24 September 2021; Buygore)
- "Fypm" (featuring Jonathan.) (22 October 2021; Buygore)
- "Sexy Boi" (19 November 2021; Buygore)

=== Mixtapes ===
- Ice Cream Mixtape (2009; Self-released)
- Gorestep's Most Hated (2009; Self-released)
- The Filthiest Hits...So Far (2011; Sumerian)
- Borgore's Misadventures in Dubstep (7 March 2012; Buygore)

=== Remixes ===
- Onili – "Sentimental" (Borgore Body Remix) (2007)
- Rusko – "Woo Boost" (Borgore Remix) (2008)
- Britney Spears – "Womanizer" (Borgore Remix) (2009)
- Jellybass and Brother Culture – "No Love" (Borgore and Jazzsteppa Remix) (2010)
- Passion Pit – "Sleepyhead" (Borgore Remix) (2010)
- Bring Me the Horizon – "It Never Ends" (Borgore VIP Remix) (2010)
- Neon Hitch – "Get Over You" (Borgore Remix) (2011)
- Gorillaz – "Clint Eastwood" (Borgore's Drinking is Bad Bootleg Remix) (2011)
- Asking Alexandria – "Final Episode (Let's Change The Channel)" (Borgore's Die Bitch Remix) (2011)
- M.I.A. – "Illygirl" (Borgore Illygore Remix) (2012)
- Hollywood Undead – "I Don't Wanna Die" (Borgore Remix) (2012)
- LMFAO – "Sexy and I Know It" (Borgore and Tomba Remix) (2012)
- Dev – "Kiss My Lips" (Borgore Remix) (2012)
- Cedric Gervais – "Molly" (Borgore Suck My Tit Remix) (2012)
- Waka Flocka Flame – "Rooster in My Rari" (Borgore Remix) (2013)
- Metallica – "Master Of Puppets" (Borgore Remix) (2013)
- Awolnation – "Sail" (Borgore Remix) (2013)
- Migos – "Hannah Montana" (Borgore and Protohype Remix) (2013)
- The Marvelettes – "Please Mr. Postman" (Borgore and Luke and Skywalker Remix) (2013)
- Dirtyphonics – "Hanging On Me" (Borgore and Ookay Remix) (2013)
- Jason Derulo featuring Snoop Dogg – "Wiggle" (Borgore's "Remix") (2014)
- O.T. Genasis – "Coco" (Borgore Remix) (2014)
- KSHMR and Dillon Francis featuring Becky G – "Clouds" (Borgore Remix) (2015)
- Brewski – "Niykee Heaton" (Borgore Remix) (2015)
- Selena Gomez – "Same Old Love" (Borgore Remix) (2015)
- Rihanna – "Needed Me" (Borgore Remix) (2016)
- Pink Guy – "Dumplings" (Borgore Remix) (2017)
- Borgore – "Petty" (Borgore VIP Remix) (2019)
- WHIPPED CREAM – "CRY" (Borgore Remix) (2023)

=== Production credits ===
- Yelawolf – "Animal" (Produced by Borgore and Diplo) (2011)
- Kota Banks – "Toy" (Produced by Borgore) (2019)
- Dudu Faruk – "I Cum (Giraffe)" (Produced by Borgore) (2019)

== See also ==
- Music in Israel
