= Bass music =

Umbrella term for EDM and hip hop music genres

Bass music is any of several genres of electronic dance music and hip hop music arising from the 1980s on, focusing on a prominent bass drum and/or bassline sound. As one source notes, there are "many different types of bass music to fall into, each putting a different spin on one of music's loudest elements". Typically, the bass sound is created using synthesizers and drum machines such as the influential Roland TR-808 or software synthesizers like Xfer Serum.

Electronic dance music genres of this type may include:

- Bass house
- Bassline
- Drum and bass
- Dubstep
- EDM trap
- Footwork
- Future bass
- Glitch hop
- Gqom
- Midtempo bass
- Moombahton
- Nu skool breaks
- UK bass
- UK garage
- Wave
- Wonky

Hip hop genres of this type may include:

- Miami bass
- Trap

== See also ==
- Booty bass
- Nightcore & Nightstep
