= Zomboy =

English DJ and producer

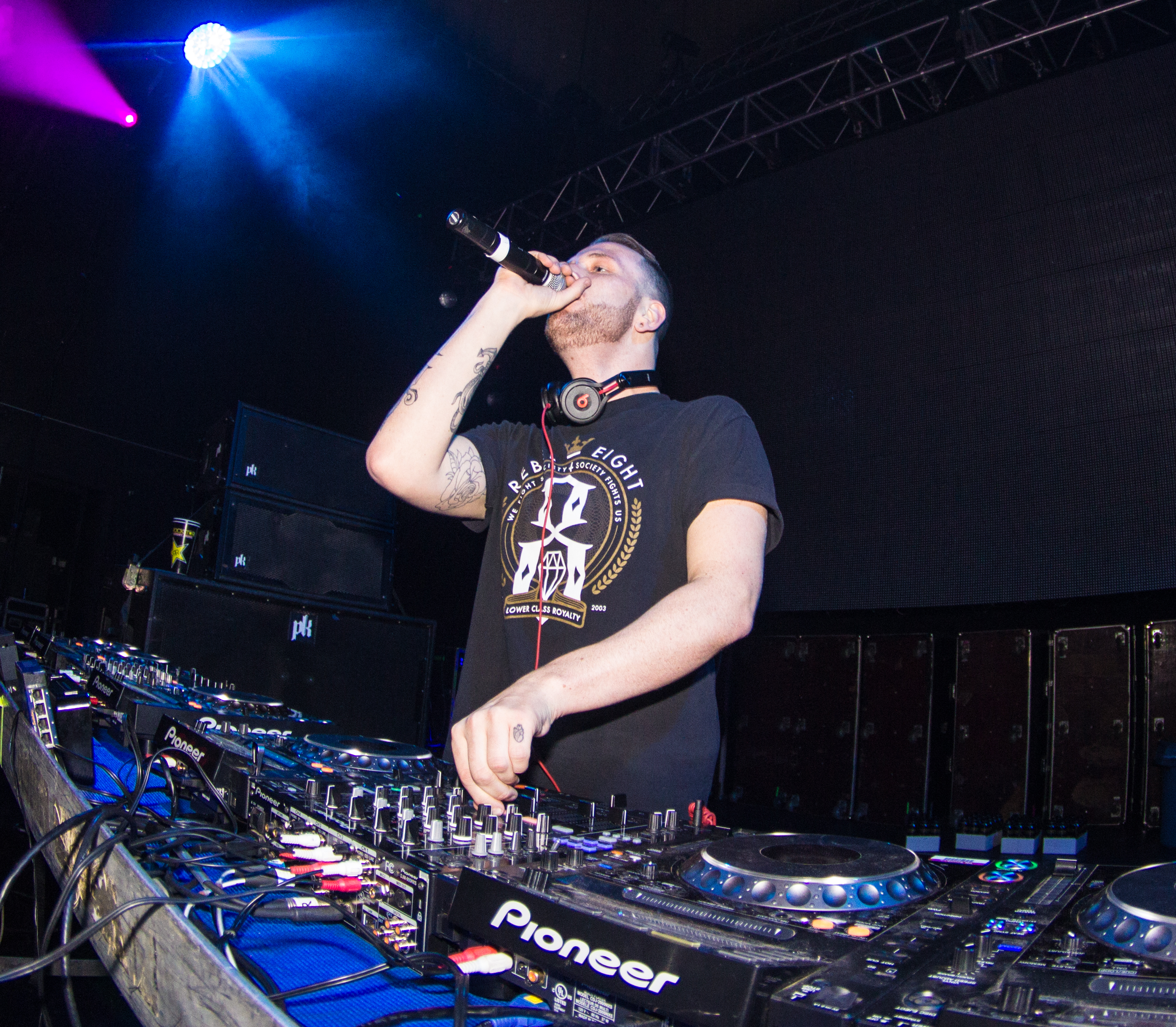
- Zomboy in 2015

Background information
- Born: Joshua Paul Jenkins; 1 June 1989 (age 37)
- Origin: Penzance, Cornwall, England
- Genres: Dubstep, drumstep, electro house, glitch hop, hybrid trap
- Occupations: Songwriter, DJ, record producer
- Works: Zomboy discography
- Years active: 2010–present
- Labels: Never Say Die; No Tomorrow Recordings; Rott N' Roll
- Formerly of: Place Your Bet$
- Website: zomboyofficial.com

Joshua Mellody (born Joshua Paul Jenkins, 1 June 1989), professionally known as Zomboy, is an English dubstep music producer, songwriter, and DJ whose mascot is a zombie.

== Biography ==
Before Joshua Mellody was active under the name Zomboy, he had an electronicore project called Place Your Bet$, under which a self-titled demo album was released in 2010.

Zomboy debuted in 2011 with the EP Game Time, which was released through his independent record label, Never Say Die Records. His debut EP was in top 5 of the Beatport dubstep charts for over eight weeks. At the end of the year, his music and remixes were licensed to compilations on labels like Warner and Ministry of Sound.

In 2012, he released his second EP, The Dead Symphonic EP. In March 2013, he released the single "Here to Stay" featuring Lady Chann on No Tomorrow Records. In September 2013, his Reanimated EP was released in two parts, of which Pt. 1 was released on Never Say Die Records & Pt. 2 on No Tomorrow Recordings. His debut album entitled The Outbreak on Never Say Die Records was released in August 2014. 2016 saw the release of the Neon Grave EP, featuring four tracks; remixes of these tracks were released in an EP in early 2017.

2022 also saw the release of an EP entitled Rott N' Roll Part 1 coinciding with a US tour; the remixes of this EP were released that November.

Zomboy cites influences such as Skrillex, Reso, Rusko and Bare Noize. He studied Music Production at the Academy of Contemporary Music in Guildford.

== Discography ==
- Game Time EP (2011)
- The Dead Symphonic (2012)
- Reanimated, Pt. 1 EP (2013)
- Reanimated, Pt. 2 EP (2014)
- The Outbreak (2014)
- Resurrected (2015)
- Neon Grave EP (2016)
- Rott N' Roll, Pt. 1 - EP (2017)
- Rott N' Roll, Pt. 2 - EP (2019)
- Dead Man Walking, Pt. 1 - EP (2022)
- Dead Man Walking, Pt. 2 - EP (2024)
