= Chime (musician) =

British electronic music producer and DJ (born 1994)

Background information
- Also known as: Dec3mber
- Born: 10 June 1994 (age 32); United Kingdom
- Origin: Leeds, West Yorkshire, England
- Genres: Colour bass; Dubstep; drum and bass; Riddim
- Occupations: Music producer; DJ
- Instrument: Digital audio workstation (Logic Pro)
- Years active: 2010–present
- Labels: Circus; Firepower; Disciple; Monstercat; Never Say Die; NCS; Ophelia; Rushdown
- Website: chimetunes.net

Freya Goldfinch (born 10 June 1994), also known by her stage name Chime, is a British electronic music producer and DJ. She is known for her work in the dubstep and bass music scenes, in particular the development of the colour bass subgenre. Chime coined the term "colour bass" to describe a style of dubstep with its focus on vibrant, bright and colourful production and sound design. Chime founded the record label Rushdown in 2016 to promote artists producing colour bass. Chime previously released music as part of Caution & Crisis and under the alias Dec3mber before adopting the alias Chime in 2015. Chime is transgender, having come out on August 2, 2026.

Chime is based in Leeds, where she lived during her childhood. She has been producing music since 2010. In addition to Rushdown, Chime has released music under a number of other labels. Between 2019 and 2021, Chime released the extended plays "Sidequest", "Interdimensional", "Our Flame", and "Tritone" on Disciple Records. Tritone was a collaboration with Franky Nuts and Oliverse. Chime debuted on Canadian electronic music label Monstercat with her remix of Tokyo Machine's "PLAY" in 2020. She has since released several singles through the label, including two collaborations with American dubstep musician Au5. Chime toured with Au5 in 2022 in The Other Side Tour. Chime released the singles "Rainbow Rave Parade" and "Bring Me Back" on Monstercat in 2022.

Chime has collaborated with numerous other dubstep artists, including Ace Aura, Dion Timmer, Doctor P, Dr. Ozi, Flux Pavilion, FuntCase, and Skybreak. In 2023, Chime released her debut album, "Aetherborne" on Rushdown. Spanning 17 tracks, the album is primarily in the colour bass style. In September 2025, Chime announced she would be shifting away from the colour bass style towards one more heavily influenced by UK garage.

== Career ==
Goldfinch began producing music as Caution & Crisis in 2010 with her cousin James Shakeshaft. The duo primarily made drum and bass, with influences from DnB producers Danny Byrd and Netsky. In 2012, Caution & Crisis released remixes of C418's tracks "Sweden" and "Cat" from Minecraft – Volume Alpha. Her remix of "Sweden" has garnered over 13 million views on YouTube.

In 2014, Goldfinch began to release music under her solo project Dec3mber. In 2015, Goldfinch adopted the alias Chime. Goldfinch decided on the name "Chime" after she came up with the idea to integrate a wind chime into her logo. The name also reflected Goldfinch's enjoyment of the sound of wind chimes. In 2018, Chime released the extended play Evolve on Circus Records.

In 2018, Chime and Ace Aura's remix of "Wet Napkin" by Ray Volpe was allegedly plagiarized by American producer thesourwarhead.

In 2023, Chime performed at an anime-themed club event in Los Angeles.

== Artistry ==
Goldfinch describes her "colour bass" style of music as a "categorisation of bass music that focuses on melody, emotion and vibrancy alongside the weight and aggression often associated with dubstep." According to Goldfinch, the subgenre aims to bridge the gap between "dark" and "light" in the dubstep scene, drawing on the best elements of both sides.

Chime cites Au5, Seven Lions, Virtual Riot, and Zomboy as influences.

== Discography ==
=== As Dec3mber ===
==== Extended plays ====
Title	Details
Incandescent	Released: 1 June 2015; Label: Crime Kitchen; Format: Digital download

=== As Chime ===
==== Studio albums ====
Title	Details
Aetherborne	Released: 25 April 2023; Label: Rushdown; Format: Digital download

==== Extended plays ====
Title	Details
Escapism	Released: 7 September 2015; Label: Daily Earfood; Format: Digital download
From Fairies to Fire	Released: 27 May 2016; Label: Firepower Records; Format: Digital download
Invincible	Released: 25 August 2017; Label: Firepower Records; Format: Digital download
Experience Points	Released: 13 April 2018; Label: Circus Records; Format: Digital download
Featherweight	Released: 25 May 2018; Label: Firepower Records; Format: Digital download
Evolve	Released: 30 November 2018; Label: Circus Records; Format: Digital download
Sidequest	Released: 27 March 2019; Label: Disciple Records; Format: Digital download
Interdimensional	Released: 31 July 2019; Label: Disciple Records; Format: Digital download
Our Flame	Released: 7 August 2020; Label: Disciple Records; Format: Digital download
Tritone (with Franky Nuts & Oliverse)	Released: 12 February 2021; Label: Disciple Records; Format: Digital download
Phosphor/Micrology	Released: 9 August 2024; Label: Disciple Records; Format: Digital download
Between	Released: 13 August 2025; Label: Monstercat; Format: Digital download
Raindrops	Released: 22 May 2026; Label: Deadbeats; Format: Digital download
