= Barely Alive =

American electronic music production and DJ duo from Great Barrington, Massachusetts

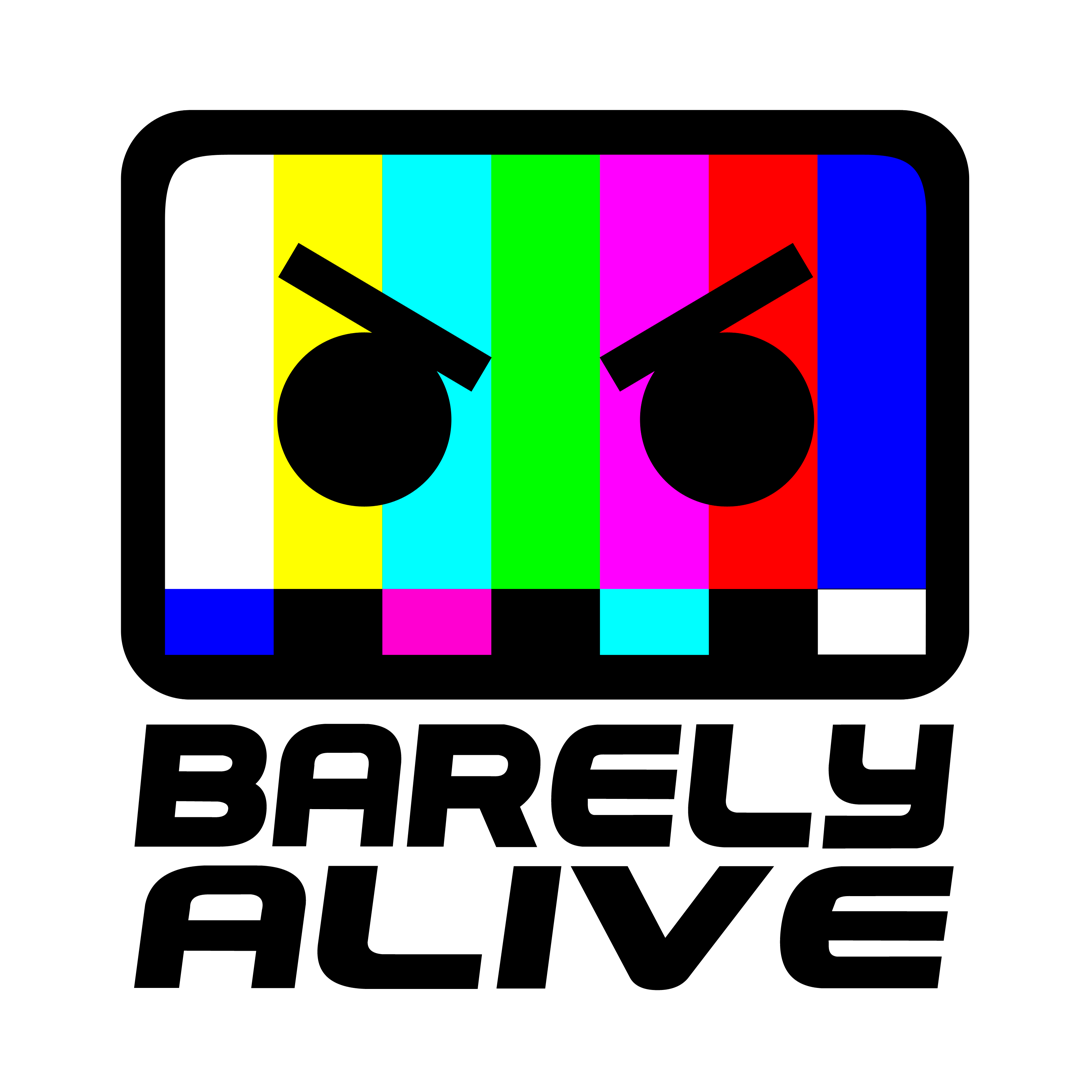
- Official Logo

Background information
- Origin: Great Barrington, Massachusetts, U.S.
- Genres: Dubstep; Riddim; Trap; Electro house; Moombahcore; Glitch-hop; Drumstep; Bass music
- Instrument: Digital Audio Workstation (DAW)
- Years active: 2013–present
- Labels: Bassrush; Disciple; Disciple Round Table; Firepower; Killed It!; Monstercat; OWSLA
- Members: Matthew Meier; William "Watt" Watkins
- Website: barelyalive.com

Barely Alive is an American electronic music production and DJ duo composed of Matthew Meier and William "Watt" Watkins founded in Great Barrington, Massachusetts, U.S. The duo is well known for their songs on British-American and Los Angeles based electronic music record label: Disciple Records.

Similar to some EDM groups such as Bassjackers and Dash Berlin, William's primary role is the headliner (as Watt) for the duo's tours whereas Matthew's primary role is the music production and "behind-the-scenes".

== History ==
Meier and Watkins both attended Monument Mountain Regional High School and participated in its music program. The duo, each, grew up with parents with a rock music background.

The duo began producing in 2013, releasing digital singles on Dirty Duck Audio and Adapted Records, and remixing other artists such as Getter, Virtual Riot, Astronaut and others. In 2014, Barely Alive signed to Disciple Recordings, releasing the four-song EP, Lost In The Internet, early in the year. The release was an immediate success on dance music retail site, Beatport (where the duo were eventually named the second best-selling dubstep artist of 2014), and they began touring the U.S and Europe along with artists such as Datsik and Trolley Snatcha.

Numerous singles and EPs followed, including collaborations with Zomboy & Splitbreed, and the duo's full-length debut album, We Are Barely Alive, surfaced on Disciple Recordings in October 2015. Since then, the duo released their OWSLA debut single, "Back To Back", a remix to SKisM’s "Experts", and their remix album, We Are Barely Alive: The Remixes.

Their OWSLA debut EP, Domain EP, was released in early February 2017. In late July, Disciple Recordings released a teaser for the duo's second album, Odyssey, which was released on August 13, 2018.

The duo released their seventh EP on Disciple Recordings, Lost In Time on February 13, 2019. After collaborating with 12th Planet & PhaseOne for the single Bubzstep on May 13, 2019, Barely Alive released their eighth EP on Disciple Recordings entitled Multiplayer on 03 Jul 2019.

In August 2026, Barely Alive launched a record label, Killed It! (formerly none hundred around 2025), which was accompanied by the 18-track compilation Killed It! Vol. 1.

=== Etymology ===
The name 'Barely Alive' came from a "random movie quote", and the logo was inspired by a test card.

== Discography ==
=== Albums ===
Title	Tracklist	Details
We Are Barely Alive	1. Hackers (feat. Armanni Reign); 2. Binary; 3. Windpipe (feat. Ragga Twins); 4. Rough and Rugged; 5. Stomp; 6. The Riddler; 7. Pooyoso (Take It Back); 8. We Are Barely Alive (Interlude); 9. Over It; 10. Scoop; 11. Poison Dart; 12. Fireflies (feat. Ewol & Espired); 13. Elephant; 14. No Time	Released: October 26, 2015; Label: Disciple Records; Format: Digital download
Odyssey	1. Odyssey; 2. Know About Me (feat. Virus Syndicate); 3. Deeper In Love (feat. Great Good Fine Ok); 4. Bad Thang (feat. Splitbreed); 5. Xenomorph; 6. Bounce Wit Me; 7. Devil's Tower; 8. New Coupe: Ride Out (feat. Iamsu!); 9. War Of The Worlds; 10. Buddy (feat. Yves Paquet); 11. Wompum; 12. Shutdown; 13. Warrior (feat. Mad Hed City); 14. Over (feat. Nah Mean)	Released: August 13, 2018; Label: Disciple Records; Format: Digital download

=== EPs ===
Title	Tracklist	Details
Lost in the Internet	1. Chasing Ghosts (with Spock & Directive); 2. Dial Up; 3. Keyboard Killer (feat. Splitbreed); 4. Chasing Ghosts (Virtual Riot Remix)	Released: March 10, 2014; Label: Disciple Records; Format: Digital download
Internet Streets	1. Cyber Bully (feat. Messinian); 2. Rifle Blow Kiss (feat. Soultrain Locomotive; 3. Candy Kids (with Datsik); 4. Cyber Bully (The Frim Remix)	Released: June 9, 2014; Label: Disciple Records/Firepower Records; Format: Digital download
Fiber Optic	1. Zombie Hunter; 2. Boston Shit; 3. Lasers Up; 4. Work It; 5. Lasers Up (Habstrakt Remix)	Released: January 26, 2015; Label: Disciple Records; Format: Digital download
Rivals(with Astronaut)	1. Rivals; 2. Bad Fellas; 3. Raga; 4. Some Kind of Monster	Released: March 30, 2015; Label: Disciple Records; Format: Digital download
Domain	1. CA$H; 2. Elastic Nightmare; 3. Kickin' In (feat. Chloe Stamp); 4. Gumby (with Habstrakt)	Released: February 10, 2017; Label: Owsla; Format: Digital download
Lost In Time	1. Wack; 2. Be Mine; 3. Our Own Way (with Modestep); 4. Rock The Beat; 5. Break Em Down; 6. My Favorite Star	Released: February 13, 2019; Label: Disciple Records; Format: Digital download
Multiplayer	1. Arsonist (with PhaseOne & Virus Syndicate); 2. Bloodshed (with Crichy Crich & MVRDA); 3. Weed Haha (with Bandlez & Rod Azlan); 4. Can't Hold Back (with SampliFire); 5. Crankin (with Eliminate)	Released: July 3, 2019; Label: Disciple Records; Format: Digital download
Head To Head Vol. 1 (with Virtual Riot)	1. Wompum (VIP Mix); 2. Odyssey (VIP Mix)	Released: August 28, 2020; Label: Disciple Records; Format: Digital download
Head To Head Vol. 2 (with Virtual Riot)	1. Weeble Wobble (VIP Mix); 2. Basement Dwellers (VIP Mix); 3. Rivals (with Astronaut) (Virtual Riot's VIP Mix)	Released: February 5, 2021; Label: Disciple Records; Format: Digital download
Computer Love	1. Computer Love; 2. Electric Lady (with Nyptane & XO ELIZA); 3. Closure (with Drew Seeley); 4. Tick Tock (with Control Freak); 5. Imagineer (with XO ELIZA)	Released: July 23, 2021; Label: Disciple Records; Format: Digital download
Feel The Panic	1. Fuck Around; 2. Let It Spin; 3. Hopped Out; 4. Crash Landing	Released: November 11, 2022; Label: Disciple Records; Format: Digital download
Casket Case	1. Big Ivan; 2. Headshot (with Mikey Ceaser); 3. Sky High (with beastboi.); 4. Double Dare	Released: December 1, 2023; Label: Bassrush Records; Format: Digital download
100% No AI	1. Overdrive (with Jesse Jacobellis); 2. Point Blank (with Edison Cole & Dani King); 3. We Set It (with Ragga Twins); 4. Lay Me Down (with Luci); 5. Leave It All Behind (with Lost Friend & Casey Cook); 6. Hunger Games (with PAV4N); 7. No Bad Parts (with TYNAN & Maddix)	Released: July 17, 2026; Label: Killed It!; Format: Digital download

=== Singles ===
Year	Title	Album	Label
2013	Killer In You	Non-album singles	Dirty Duck Audio
2013	Static Hero	Non-album singles	Adapted Records
2014	Sell Your Soul(feat. Jeff Sontag)	Non-album singles	Disciple Records
2014	Poison(with Dodge & Fuski)	Non-album singles	Disciple Records
2015	Wedabe$(feat. Splitbreed)	Non-album singles	Disciple Records
2015	The Blastaz (with Datsik)	Non-album singles	Disciple Records
2015	Smash! (with Twine)	Non-album singles	Disciple Records
2016	Back To Back	OWSLA Worldwide Broadcast	OWSLA
2016	Salty (feat. Honey C)	Non-album singles	Disciple Records
2017	Kaos(with Nonsens)	Non-album singles	Twonk
2017	Send It (with 12th Planet & PhaseOne)	Non-album singles	Disciple Records
2018	Rampage (with Virtual Riot, PhaseOne, and Myro)	Non-album singles	Disciple Records
2018	Fake U Out (with Ghastly)	Non-album singles	Haunted Haus Collective
2018	Bad Thang (feat. Splitbreed)	Non-album singles	Disciple Records
2018	Triforce (with Panda Eyes & Virtual Riot)	Non-album singles	Disciple Records
2018	Prepare To Die	Disciple X Jericho	Disciple Records
2018	By My Side (with Modestep & Virtual Riot)	Disciple Alliance Vol. 4	Disciple Records
2018	Bang Your Head (feat. Virus Syndicate)	Non-album singles	Disciple Records
2018	Mmm Good (with 12th Planet)	Swamplex Terrestrial EP	Disciple Records
2018	Bring That Back	Non-album singles	Disciple Records
2019	Bubzstep (with 12th Planet & PhaseOne)	Non-album singles	Disciple Records
2019	Here We Go (with Fox Stevenson)	Non-album singles	Disciple Records
2019	Spicy Future	Disciple 09: Dragonborn / Knights of the Round Table Vol. 3	Disciple Records
2020	Meme Graveyard (with Bandlez)	Non-album singles	Disciple Records
2020	Pray 4 Money (with Virus Syndicate)	Non-album singles	Disciple Records
2020	Know You Better (feat. XO ELIZA & Drew Seeley)	Disciple Alliance Vol. 6	Disciple Records
2021	Fusion Core (with Voltra)	Knights of the Round Table Vol. 4	Disciple Records
2021	Killer Robots	Non-album singles	Disciple Records
2021	Flak Jacket	Disciple Alliance Vol. 7	Disciple Records
2022	Power Alliance (with Samplifire)	Knights of the Round Table Vol. 5	Disciple Records
2023	T.O.A.D. (with Kompany)	Non-album singles	Disciple Records
2023	Headshot (feat. Mikey Ceaser)	Non-album singles	Bassrush Records
2024	if you wanna (feat. Skyelle)	Non-album singles	Monstercat
2025	next to me (with beastboi.)	Non-album singles	Killed It!
2025	don't stop	Non-album singles	Killed It!
2025	chicken jockey	Non-album singles	Killed It!
2025	hold me	Non-album singles	Killed It!
2025	HANDS UP	Non-album singles	Killed It!
2026	OBSCURE VIBE (with Infekt)	Non-album singles	Port Zero
2026	SPEED DEMON	Non-album singles	Monstercat
2026	Time Machine (with Zomboy)	Non-album singles	Monstercat

=== Remixes ===
Year	Original Artist	Title	Label
2013	Hellberg, Deutgen, and Splitbreed	Collide (with Astronaut)	Monstercat
2013	Astronaut	Apollo	Monstercat
2013	Getter & Datsik	Hollow Point	Firepower Records
2014	Dodge & Fuski & Nick Thayer	Playboy	Disciple Records
2014	Destroid	Destroid 2 Wasteland	Destroid Music
2014	Eptic	Like A Boss	Never Say Die Records
2014	501	Kill Your Boss	Never Say Die Records
2015	Zomboy	Resurrected	Never Say Die Records
2016	Barely Alive	Binary (with Virtual Riot)	Disciple Records
2016	L D R U (feat. Savoi)	Next To You	Ultra Records
2016	Henry Fong	Drop It Down Low	Dim Mak Records
2016	Herobust	Dirty Work	Mad Decent
2016	Mayhem & Antiserum	Sweat	Seven Deadly Sins
2016	DJ Snake	Ocho Cinco	Interscope Records
2017	Snails & Pegboard Nerds	Deep In The Night	Monstercat
2017	FuntCase (feat. Merky ACE)	4 Barz Of Fury	Circus Records
2017	Excision, Datsik, and Dion Timmer	Harambe	Rottun Recordings
2019	Dodge & Fuski	Silence Is Golden	Disciple Records
2020	PhaseOne (feat. Bone Thugs-n-Harmony)	Ultima	Disciple Records
2023	Slander	Love Is Gone	Slander Music
2025	Marshmello, TRICKSTAR, and Lil Jon	The Roots (Remixes)	Joytime Collective
