= German Engineering =

EP by Virtual Riot
- Released: 31 January 2018
- Genre: Riddim; dubstep
- Length: 21:54
- Label: Disciple
- Producer: Christian Valentin Brunn

Virtual Riot chronology
Still Kids (2017)	German Engineering (2018)	Preset Junkies (2018)

German Engineering is the thirteenth extended play by German DJ and electronic music producer Virtual Riot. It was released by American record label Disciple Recordings on 31 January 2018. It contains six songs, including a collaboration with British grime collective Virus Syndicate. It peaked at the number 11 spot on Billboard's Dance/Electronic Album Sales chart.

== Background and release ==
On 31 January 2018, the extended play was released as a digital download on international digital stores through American record label Disciple, as well as being released through various music streaming services. The SoundCloud version of the extended play also included Virtual Riot's previous song "Shindeiru" and an acapella of the Virus Syndicate collaboration "Show Up".

The extended play debuted in the Billboard Dance/Electronic Album Sales chart at the number 11 spot, marking Virtual Riot's second appearance on the chart after his Chemistry extended play, which peaked at the number 20 position in May 2016.

== Critical reception ==
German Engineering was well received by most critics. Robyn Dexter of Dancing Astronaut described it as a compilation of Virtual Riot "flexing the heavier side of his production style", writing that it would remind listeners about "just how broad his style range truly is." Your EDM's Matthew Meadow noted that the extended play consists mostly of riddim and dubstep songs and praised Virtual Riot's "impeccable sound design and engineering", stating that it was just another "fantastic EP in a long series of releases from Virtual Riot, and we wouldn’t expect anything less." Writing for EDMTunes, Nina Chiang gave it praise, saying that "Virtual Riot is going to launch his diverse range of sound into a new era of bass."

== Track listing ==
Digital download
No.	Title	Producer(s)	Length
1.	"Pray For Riddim"	Virtual Riot	3:37
2.	"Show Up" (with Virus Syndicate)	Virtual Riot; Virus Syndicate	4:27
3.	"Chop Chop"	Virtual Riot	2:40
4.	"Jump the Gun"	Virtual Riot	3:41
5.	"Komputermusik"	Virtual Riot	3:21
6.	"The Darkest Night"	Virtual Riot	4:08
Total length:			21:54

== Charts ==
Chart (2018)	Peak position
Dance/Electronic Album Sales (Billboard)	11

== Release history ==
Region	Date	Format	Label	Ref.
Worldwide	31 January 2018	Digital download	Disciple	
