= Chemistry (Virtual Riot EP) =

EP by Virtual Riot
- Released: 2 May 2016
- Recorded: 2015–16
- Genre: Dubstep
- Length: 16:51
- Label: Disciple
- Producer: Christian Valentin Brunn

Virtual Riot chronology
Machinery (2015)	Chemistry (2016)	Throwback (2017)

Chemistry is the twelfth extended play by electronic artist Christian Valentin Brunn, commonly known as his stage name, Virtual Riot. Chemistry was released on 2 May 2016, by the electronic music label, Disciple Recordings. The EP features four songs, all of which are collaborations with other artists such as Borg, a collaboration with FuntCase and Juices, a collaboration with Dubloadz.

== Background and composition ==
Chemistry was released to positive reception, with Niquemai from Stoney Roads calling the EP "one of the strongest dubstep EP's released this year thus far".

A remix EP titled Chemistry (The Remixes) was released on 29 August 2016. The remix EP features remixes from Pegboard Nerds, Downlink, Ekko & Sidetrack, and Oolacile.

== Track listing ==
=== Chemistry ===
No.	Title	Length
1.	"Borg" (with FuntCase)	4:25
2.	"Showdown" (with ShockOne)	4:02
3.	"Juices" (with Dubloadz)	4:54
4.	"Leave it behind" (with 12th Planet, featuring Ash Riser)	3:30
Total length:		16:51

=== Chemistry (The Remixes) ===
No.	Title	Length
1.	"Borg" (with FuntCase, Downlink remix)	3:55
2.	"Showdown" (with ShockOne, Ekko & Sidetrack Remix)	3:44
3.	"Juices" (with Dubloadz, Pegboard Nerds Remix)	3:45
4.	"Leave it behind" (with 12th Planet, featuring Ash Riser, Oolacile Remix)	4:24
Total length:		15:08

== Charts ==
Chart (2016)	Peak position
Top Dance/Electronic Albums (Billboard)	20
