= Virtual Riot =

German DJ and electronic music producer (born 1994)

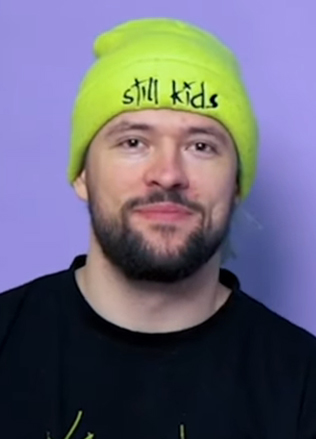
- Virtual Riot in 2025

Background information
- Also known as: Still Kids
- Born: Christian Valentin Brunn; 20 July 1994 (age 32); Marl, North Rhine-Westphalia, Germany
- Genres: EDM; electronic; dubstep; riddim
- Occupations: Music producer; DJ
- Instruments: Synthesizers; piano; digital audio workstation
- Years active: 2010–present
- Labels: Warner; Owsla; Lowly; Monstercat; Rottun; Firepower; Circus; Disciple; Never Say Die; Buygore; Slugz Music; Cyclops Recordings; FORM; SectionZ; Audiophile Live; Moving Castle; Jet Set Trash; Spirited; Phantom Hertz Recordings; Anemnesis; Bass Liberation; N-recordings
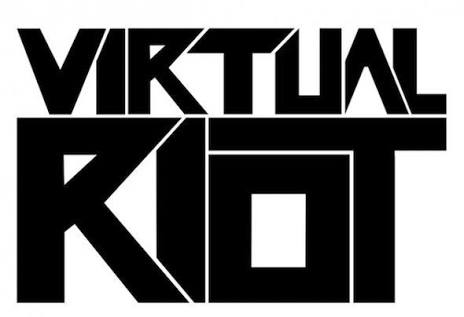

YouTube information
- Channel: Virtual Riot
- Years active: 2011–present
- Genre: Music
- Subscribers: 533 thousand
- Views: 113 million
- Last updated: 1 July 2026

Christian Valentin "Val" Brunn (born 20 July 1994), better known by his stage name Virtual Riot, is a German DJ and electronic music producer. He has released seventeen extended plays and three studio albums, most notably his 2016 extended play Chemistry, which peaked at 20 on Billboard's Dance/Electronic Albums charts and 2018's extended play German Engineering, which peaked at No. 11 on the Dance/Electronic Digital Song Sales chart. He was signed to the independent music label Disciple Recordings in 2014. On 16 April 2019, he announced a publishing deal with Skrillex's OWSLA.

== Career ==
Brunn had numerous Beatport chart hits including "One For All, All For One" with Razihel and "Cali Born" with Helicopter Showdown. Other electronic music outlets, such as Your EDM, have called his music "non-traditional" and "edgy", comparing him to artists like Savant.

Prior to producing under the alias "Virtual Riot", Brunn produced ambient dubstep and future garage music under the alias "Your Personal Tranquilizer".

Brunn released several EPs under British record label Disciple, including his charted EP, Chemistry. He produces in genres such as riddim, future bass, future garage, electro house, and both traditional and melodic dubstep.

On 9 August 2021, Brunn announced his debut studio album titled Simulation, which released on 10 September that same year on Disciple Recordings.

On 18 October 2024, Brunn released his second studio album on the label Monstercat, titled Stealing Fire.

On 9 April 2026, Brunn released his third studio album, Burning Out, also on Monstercat.

== Discography ==
=== Studio albums ===
Title	Details
Simulation	Released: 10 September 2021; Label: Disciple Recordings; Format: Digital download
Stealing Fire	Released: 18 October 2024; Label: Monstercat; Format: Digital download
Burning Out	Released: 9 April 2026; Label: Monstercat; Format: Digital download

=== Compilations ===
Title	Details
There Goes Your Money	Released: 27 May 2013; Label: Disciple Recordings; Format: Digital download
The Classics	Released: 5 May 2017; Label: Create Classics; Format: Digital download
Head to Head Vol. 1 (with Barely Alive)	Released: 28 August 2020; Label : Disciple Recordings; Format: Digital download
Head to Head Vol. 2 (with Barely Alive)	Released: 6 February 2021; Label : Disciple Recordings; Format: Digital download

=== Extended plays ===
Title	Details	Peak chart positions	
Title	Details	US Dance	US Dance Sales
From Space	Released: 25 May 2011; Label: Phantom Hertz Recordings; Format: Digital download	—	—
Transmission	Released: 4 October 2011; Label: Phantom Hertz Recordings; Format: Digital download	—	—
Drop Some	Released: 6 August 2013; Label: Bass Liberation; Format: Digital download	—	—
Sugar Rush	Released: 14 October 2013; Label: Audiophile Live; Format: Digital download	—	—
We're Not Alone	Released: 11 August 2014; Label: Disciple Recordings; Format: Digital download	—	—
100% No Bangers	Released: 27 December 2014; Label: Self-Released; Format: Digital download	—	—
Nightmare	Released: 16 February 2015; Label: Disciple Recordings; Format: Digital download	—	—
Machinery	Released: 21 September 2015; Label: Disciple Recordings; Format: Digital download	—	—
Chemistry	Released: 2 May 2016; Label: Disciple Recordings; Format: Digital download	20	—
Throwback	Released: 27 February 2017; Label: Disciple Recordings; Format: Digital download	—	—
Still Kids	Released: 10 August 2017; Label: Spirited; Format: Digital download	—	—
German Engineering	Released: 31 January 2018; Label: Disciple Recordings; Format: Digital download	–	11
Preset Junkies	Released: 24 October 2018; Label: Disciple Recordings; Format: Digital download	–	—
Save Yourself	Released: 25 September 2019; Label: Disciple Recordings; Format: Digital download	—	—
Head to Head, Vol. 1 (with Barely Alive)	Released: 28 August 2020; Label: Disciple Recordings; Format: Digital download	—	—
Head to Head, Vol. 2 (with Barely Alive)	Released: 6 February 2021; Label: Disciple Recordings; Format: Digital download	—	—
"—" denotes an extended play that did not chart or was not released.

=== As featured artist ===
Title	Details
In Love With the World (by Aura Dione)	Released: 1 January 2012; Label: Universal Music Germany; Format: Digital download
Getting Wet (by Lock N Bounce)	Released: 1 May 2013; Label: Jet Set Trash; Format: Digital download
Destination: Quantum (by Astronaut)	Released: 19 March 2014; Label: Monstercat; Format: Digital download
Emotional (Remixes) (by Flux Pavilion and Matthew Koma)	Released: 22 January 2016; Label: Circus Records; Format: Digital download
Alt Classic (by Kill the Noise)	Released: 13 May 2016; Label: Owsla; Format: Digital download
RAVEN (by Grey)	Released: 13 October 2023; Label: Lowly; Format: Digital download

=== Singles ===
Title	Year	Album	Label
"Dreaming"	2011	Transmission	Phantom Hertz Recordings
"Dance with Me"	2011	Non-album singles	Self-released
"Renegade A. I."	2011	Non-album singles	Self-released
"Cold Winds and Warm Blankets"	2011	Non-album singles	Self-released
"Nights on Fire"	2011	There Goes Your Money	Disciple Records
"The Pit"	2012	Non-album singles	Self-released
"Stargarden"	2012	Non-album singles	Self-released
"Another Way"	2012	Non-album singles	Self-released
"Energy Drink"	2013	Non-album singles	Self-released
"Evil Gameboy"	2013	There Goes Your Money	Disciple Records
"Paper Planes"	2014	Non-album singles	Self-released
"Earth & Sky"	2014	Non-album singles	Self-released
"Rampage"	2014	Non-album singles	Self-released
"Fuck Gravity"	2014	100% No Bangers	Self-released
"Lunar"	2015	Non-album singles	Disciple Records
"Mittens Is Angry"	2015	Non-album singles	Self-released
"Yonaka"	2015	Non-album singles	Self-released
"Disintegrate"	2015	Non-album singles	Spirited
"Preset Junkies"	2015	Non-album singles	Disciple Records / UKF Music
"Stay For a While"	2016	Non-album singles	Spirited
"Dragons"	2016	Non-album singles	Disciple Records
"Pixel Forest"	2017	Non-album singles	Spirited
"Basement Dwellers" (with Barely Alive)	2017	Non-album singles	Disciple Records
"Degenerates"	2017	Non-album singles	Disciple Records
"Continue"	2018	Non-album singles	Disciple Records
"By My Side" (with Modestep and Barely Alive)	2018	Non-album singles	Disciple Records
"Dog Fight"	2018	Non-album singles	Disciple Records
"How Do You Turn This On"	2018	Non-album singles	Disciple Records
"Cry Some More"	2018	Non-album singles	Disciple Records
"PN-35A"	2019	Non-album singles	Self-released
"Das Riddim" (with Infekt)	2019	Non-album singles	Disciple Records
"Spicy Riddim Drums" (with Modestep)	2020	Non-album singles	Disciple Records
"Dream Logic"	2020	Non-album singles	Disciple Records
"Heavy Bass Design, Vol. 2"	2020	Non-album singles	Disciple Records
"This Could Be Us" (with Modestep and Frank Zummo)	2021	Simulation	Disciple Records
"Chroma"	2021	Simulation	Disciple Records
"Neon Angel" (with LeKtriQue and Leah Culver)	2021	Simulation	Disciple Records
"Raven" (with Grey)	2023	Non-album singles	Lowly Records
"I heard you like polyrhythms"	2024	Non-album singles	Self-released
"Give in to you" (with Rezz and One True God)	2024	Stealing Fire	Monstercat
"Believe What You Want"	2024	Stealing Fire	Monstercat
"Scorched Earth"	2024	Stealing Fire	Monstercat
"Damage" (with DJ Diesel featuring Shaquille O'Neal)	2024	M.D.E.	Monstercat
"What U Got" (with Viperactive)	2025	Burning Out	Monstercat
"Aura Farming" (with Eliminate)	2025	Burning Out	Monstercat
"Sh*t's on F*re"	2026	Burning Out	Monstercat
"Best of Me" (with Blanke featuring Dia Frampton)	2026	Burning Out	Monstercat
"Paralyzed" (with YDG featuring Luma)	2026	Burning Out	Monstercat
"Yellow Light" (with Said The Sky and HYMNALS)	2026	Burning Out	Monstercat

=== Mashups ===
Title	Year	Album	Label
"Idols"	2013	Non-album singles	Self-released
"Superheroes" (with Panda Eyes)	2015	Non-album singles	Self-released

=== VIP (Variation In Production) mixes ===
Title	Year	Album	Label
"We're Not Alone"	2015	We're Not Alone (The Remixes)	Disciple Recordings
"Warm Ups"	2016	Disciple 03: Risen	Disciple Recordings
"In My Head" (featuring PRXZM)	2017	Free Spirits, Vol. 4	Spirited
"Purple Dragons" (Dragons VIP)	2017	Non-album singles	Self-released
"Everyday" (featuring Yosie)	2017	Non-album singles	Spirited
"Preset Junkies"	2018	Preset Junkies EP	Disciple Recordings
"Lost It" (featuring Pearl Andersson)	2019	Knights of the Round Table, Vol. 3	Disciple Round Table
"Pray for Riddim"	2020	Head to Head Vol. 1 (with Barely Alive)	Disciple Recordings
"Cry Some More"	2020	Head to Head Vol. 1 (with Barely Alive)	Disciple Recordings
"Show Up" (featuring Virus Syndicate)	2021	Head to Head Vol. 2 (with Barely Alive)	Disciple Recordings
"Weeble Wobble"	2021	Head to Head Vol. 2 (with Barely Alive)	Disciple Recordings
"Basement Dwellers"	2021	Head to Head Vol. 2 (with Barely Alive)	Disciple Recordings
"Rivals" (with Astronaut)	2021	Head to Head Vol. 2 (with Barely Alive)	Disciple Recordings
"Simulation"	2024	Simulation - The DLC	Disciple Recordings
"Neon Angel" (with LeKtriQue and Leah Culver)	2024	Simulation - The DLC	Disciple Recordings
"We're Not Alone"	2024	Simulation - The DLC	Disciple Recordings
"WHILE YOU WERE SLEEPING" (with Skrillex and Nakeesha)	2025	Fuck U Skrillex You Think Ur Andy Warhol but Ur Not!!	Atlantic Records
"Star Destroyer"	2025	Stealing Fire (Remixes)	Monstercat

=== Original compilation features ===
Title	Year	Album	Label
"Illusion Machine"	2012	Shock Therapy LP	Phantom Hertz Recordings
"Gangsters"	2014	Disciple Alliance, Vol. 1	Disciple Recordings
"Beyond"	2015	Disciple Alliance, Vol. 2	Disciple Recordings
"Dragons"	2017	Disciple Alliance, Vol. 3	Disciple Recordings
"Degenerates"	2017	Knights of the Round Table, Vol. 1	Disciple Round Table
"Continue"	2018	Disciple x Jericho	Disciple Recordings
"Dog Fight"	2018	Disciple Alliance, Vol. 4	Disciple Recordings
"How Do You Turn This On"	2018	Disciple x Miniladd	Disciple Recordings
"Cry Some More"	2018	Knights of the Round Table, Vol. 2	Disciple Round Table
"Das Riddim" ^{(with Infekt)}	2019	Disciple Alliance, Vol. 5	Disciple Recordings
"Lost It - VIP" ^{(featuring Pearl Andersson)}	2019	Knights of the Round Table, Vol. 3	Disciple Round Table
"Dream Logic"	2020	Disciple Alliance, Vol. 6	Disciple Recordings
"Don't Need You"	2021	Disciple Alliance, Vol. 7	Disciple Recordings
"All Of The Above"	2023	All Nighter Vol. 8	FORM

=== Collaborations ===
Title	Year	Collaborator(s)	Label
"Superhuman"	2012	Amba Shepherd	Quantum
"Never Let You Go"	2012	Crystal Drop & Bunjee	Bass Liberation
"Project Mayhem"	2013	Animal	Self-released
"Cali Born"	2013	Helicopter Showdown	Anemnesis
"One For All, All For One"	2013	Razihel	Monstercat
"Where Are You"	2013	Sub.Sound	Audiophile Live
"Symphony"	2014	Jonas Minor	Disciple
"Thwek"	2014	Mr. Bill	Section Z Records
"Nightmare" (featuring Splitbreed)	2015	Autodrive	Disciple
"Fatal Fist Punch"	2015	Megalodon	Never Say Die Records
"Alien"	2015	Dodge & Fuski	Disciple
"Feel The Bass"	2015	JVST SAY YES	Disciple
"Running From The Cops"	2015	Armanni Reign	Disciple
"Borg"	2016	FuntCase	Disciple
"Showdown"	2016	ShockOne	Disciple
"Juices"	2016	Dubloadz	Disciple
"Nasty"	2016	Datsik	Firepower Records
"Leave It Behind" (featuring Ash Riser)	2016	12th Planet	Disciple
"Flutter"	2016	Madi	Moving Castle
"In My Head"	2016	PRXZM	Spirited.
"Graveyard Shift"	2016	Bukez Finezt	Disciple
"Kung Fu"	2017	PhaseOne	Disciple
"Beat Dem Up"	2017	Dirtyphonics	Buygore
"Listen"	2017	The Others	Disciple
"Don't Get Spooked"	2017	Dubloadz	Disciple
"Basement Dwellers"	2017	Barely Alive	Disciple
"Warriors of the Night"	2018	Datsik	Firepower Records
"Freakuency"	2018	Datsik	Firepower Records
"Rampage"	2018	Barely Alive, PhaseOne, and Myro	Rampage
"Triforce"	2018	Panda Eyes and Barely Alive	Disciple
"By My Side"	2018	Modestep and Barely Alive	Disciple
"Guardians Of The Universe"	2018	TeddyLoid	Gan-Shin Records
"Nothing"	2019	Modestep	Disciple
"Gang Shit"	2019	Virus Syndicate and Dion Timmer	Disciple Round Table
"Das Riddim"	2019	Infekt	Disciple
"Spicy Riddim Drums"	2020	Modestep	Disciple
"This Could Be Us"	2021	Modestep and Frank Zummo	Disciple
"Neon Angel"	2021	LeKtriQue and Leah Culver	Disciple
"Teardrop"	2022	Nghtmre and Marlhy	Lowly

=== Remixes ===
Title	Year	Artist	Label
"Speaker Fuck"	2011	Basis	Phantom Hertz Recordings
"One" (featuring Holly Drummond)	2012	Submatik & Phil	Self-released
"Now That You're Gone"	2012	Nick Galea	One Eighty
"Never Let You Go"	2012	Crystal Drop, Bunjee, and Virtual Riot	Bass Liberation
"Black Light"	2012	Lisa Rowe	Self-released
"In Love With The World"	2012	Aura Dione	Universal Music Germany
"Million Miles"	2012	off/chopped	Self-released
"Stories Can Wait"	2013	Submatik	Quantum
"Bad News"	2013	Lock N Bounce	Jet Set Trash
"Where Do We Go"	2013	1OAKS	Warner Music Germany
"Arms"	2013	MNRS	Konkordski
"Work Bitch"	2013	Britney Spears	RCA/Sony
"Next Ones To Come"	2013	Claire	Polydor/Island/Universal
"Time Is Now"	2013	Youthkills	Polydor/Island/Universal
"Mistake"	2013	Teqq vs. Alive & Kicking	Modern Chap
"Can You Feel My Heart"	2013	Bring Me the Horizon	Self-released
"Get It Right"	2013	Left Boy	Self-released
"Chasing Ghosts" (featuring Spock & Directive)	2014	Barely Alive	Disciple Recordings
"Lovers On The Run"	2014	NIHILS	Self-released
"Quantum"	2014	Astronaut	Monstercat
"Fire Away"	2014	Skrillex	Self-released
"Dial Up"	2014	Barely Alive	Disciple Recordings
"Follow You"	2014	Au5	Monstercat
"Ultraviolence"	2014	Lana Del Rey	Self-released
"Together"	2014	MUST DIE!	Self-released
"Lionhearted"	2015	Porter Robinson	Self-released
"I've Got You"	2015	Animal Music	MUK Records
"True Colors"	2015	Zedd	Interscope/Universal
"Codename X"	2016	Excision	Rottun Recordings
"Emotional"	2016	Flux Pavilion and Matthew Koma	Circus Records
"Binary" (with Barely Alive)	2016	Barely Alive	Disciple Recordings
"Without a Trace" (featuring Stalking Gia) [with Kill The Noise]	2016	Kill The Noise	Owsla
"Next To You" (featuring Savoi)	2016	LDRU	Audiopaxx/Universal
"All We Know" (featuring Phoebe Ryan)	2016	The Chainsmokers	Self-released
"Talk About It" (featuring Desirée Dawson)	2017	Pegboard Nerds	Monstercat
"One" (featuring Holly Drummond)	2017	Submatik	Self-released
"Throwin' Elbows" (with Getter)	2017	Excisions and Space Laces	Rottun recordings
"WFSU" (with Snails)	2018	Snails and Waka Flocka Flame	Slugz Music
"Clarity" (featuring Foxes)	2018	Zedd	Self-released
"Blame Myself" [with Illenium]	2021	Illenium and Tori Kelly	Warner Music
"Everybody's Dead!"	2022	Underscores	Self-released
"Spacetime"	2022	Subtronics and Nevve	Cyclops Recordings
"Pleasure Seeker"	2023	Mr. Bill	Self-released
"Your Favorite Sidekick"	2023	Underscores and 8485	Self-released
"Don't Get Too Close"	2023	Skrillex and Bibi Bourelly	Self-released
"Und die Engel singen"	2025	Till Lindemann	Out of Line Music
"DIVIDE"	2025	PhaseOne, Intervals, and Micah Martin	Sounds Of Mayhem
