= Subtronics =

Background information
- Born: Jesse Kardon; December 23, 1992 (age 33); Philadelphia, Pennsylvania, U.S.
- Genre: Dubstep
- Occupations: Disc jockey; record producer; composer
- Instrument: Digital audio workstation
- Years active: 2013–present
- Labels: Cyclops; Disciple; Kannibalen; Never Say Die; Subcarbon
- Website: subtronics.net

Jesse Kardon, better known by his alias Subtronics, is an American electronic music producer and DJ from Philadelphia, Pennsylvania. He began playing drums as a child and continued through grade school, before discovering EDM in high school. He has toured internationally, headlined major festival stages, launched his own annual festivals in North America, and released multiple charting albums. In 2020, he founded his own label, Cyclops Recordings.

Subtronics' freshman album Fractals released in January 2022 and charted at No. 4 on the Dance/Electronic Albums chart and trended globally over K-pop on Twitter/X.

He is known for his song "Griztronics", a collaboration with Michigan-based electronic music artist GRiZ that peaked on Billboard's Hot Dance/Electronic Songs at the No. 9 position in late 2019. Kardon peaked at No. 10 on Billboard's Next Big Sound chart in September 2019. Kardon is married to fellow producer and dubstep DJ Sonya Broner, also known by her alias Level Up.

In 2024, Subtronics released his second album Tesseract, which peaked at No. 5 on the US Dance/Electronic Albums chart.

== Career ==
=== 2017–2020 ===
On April 28, 2017, Florida-based dubstep producer Midnight Tyrannosaurus collaborated with Kardon to release the song "Revenge Of The Goldfish" via Never Say Die Records' Black Label imprint. The song was released for free as part of Never Say Die's sixth Black Friday compilation extended play and sampled a speech originally by Klaus Heissler during an episode of the American animated sitcom American Dad.

Subtronics released a mix series called Now That's What I Call Riddim from February 2017 to January 2020. He stated the mixes are not riddim, despite the name. On April 20, 2018, Kardon released his seventh extended play Wook Laser via Never Say Die's Black Label sub-label. The 4-track extended play was well-received, with it being described as encapsulating "everything that is right in bass at the current moment" by an EDM Sauce editor.

On July 6, Canadian electronic music duo Zeds Dead and American DJ and electronic dance music producer Jauz released a remix album of their song "Lights Go Down". Kardon's remix of the song was featured on the album, alongside remixes from by Sikdope, Duke & Jones, Gentlemans Club, Jarvis, Lick, Sqwad, Awoltalk, and Spirix.

In mid-August, Kardon's SoundCloud account was hacked and as a result, had various unreleased and private songs stolen and published by the Hacker. Before, he had received a message from Los Angeles-based dubstep producer Megalodon, asking him to repost a song uploaded by an unfamiliar account. After privately messaging him, Megalodon told Kardon that he was hacked and soon blocked him. The same account later published a song by Kardon that was previously only accessible from his hard drive and private SoundCloud account. On October 19, American record producer Herobust released a remix album of his previous song "WTF". The album, titled WTF VIP + Remixes, featured Kardon as a remix artist. In November, multiple producers had most or all of their songs removed from online audio distribution platform and music sharing website SoundCloud for wrongful copyright claims. Among these producers were Kardon, who had lost 23 songs due to these claims.

In the same year, Depth Perception EP was released on SubCarbon Records, and Thermal Expansion EP on Disciple Round Table. Kardon announced his “Headline Tour: Warp Drive Tour” during the same time period. Later on, Wook Laser EP was released on “NSD: Black Label”.

On April 17, 2019, Australian dubstep producer PhaseOne released "Demon Hunter", a collaboration with Kardon, as part of his album Transcendency via Disciple. EDM.com's Phil Sclippa commented on the song whilst reviewing the album, stating that it featured Kardon's "insane sound design and electronic music elements, along with some entertaining samples." On July 7, Kardon released his ninth extended play Cyclops Army via his record label Cyclops Recordings. The four-track extended play included the songs "Cyclops Army", "Glitch Fight", "They Call Me", and "Loopholes", most of which were previewed in the fourth volume of Kardon's mixtape series Now That's What I Call Riddim. A fifth installment was released in January 2020. Kardon marked it as the last in the mix series and included songs by Skrillex, Excision, Doctor P and Boogie T. On July 23 Canadian producer and DJ Excision released a remix album based on his fourth studio album Apex. Kardon was featured on the album with his remix of the song "Vault". While reviewing the album, Jayce Ullah-Blocks of EDM Identity briefly touched on Kardon's remix, noting that he had retained elements from the original while "fully capturing Subtronics' diverse sound palate." On August 2, English dubstep producer Rusko collaborated with Kardon to release the song "Bounce" via the latter's record label Cyclops Recordings. The song debuted during Kardon's DJ set at Electric Forest Festival and Rusko's set at Camp Bisco earlier in the year.

Subtronics released the Cyclops Army EP and the Wooked On Tronics EP on Cyclops Recordings. That year, he also dropped the single GRIZTRONICS, a collaboration with GRiZ, which went viral on TikTok and climbed to No. 9 on Billboard's Hot Dance/Electronic Songs chart in late 2019. To top it off, he headlined the Up In Smoke Tour. Writing for Dancing Astronaut, Chris Stack noted the song's influence from earlier dubstep works, utilising Kardon's "stellar syncopation and sound design" alongside Rusko's "signature elated wobbles and groove." On August 14, American songwriter and electronic producer GRiZ released his second extended play Bangers[2].Zip via Deadbeats. A collaboration between GRiZ and Kardon was released as one of the three songs featured on the extended play, titled "Griztronics"; a portmanteau of the two artists names. The song debuted during Kardon's DJ set at Electric Forest Festival. Writing for Dancing Astronaut, Chris Stack described the song as appealing even to "the most stubborn of dance fans". During October, the song became popular on video-sharing app TikTok, becoming the top trending song on the platform with over 259 million views in total. The song was associated with the hashtag #tastesdifferent, a similar wording to the song's pre-drop vocal "Ooh, this shit be hittin' different".

Next, Kardon released the Scream Saver EP and the String Theory EP, both on Cyclops Recordings. In 2019, Cyclops Recordings grew into a full-service label, signing different artists. Then he began the Cyclops Invasion Tour as the year’s headline tour. On September 10, Quebec-based vomitstep producer Snails released "Snailclops", a collaboration with Kardon, via his record label Slugz Music. In the week of September 14, 2019, Kardon peaked at number 10 on Billboard's Next Big Sound chart. On October 2, Kardon released his tenth extended play Wooked on Tronics via his record label Cyclops Recordings. The extended play features 5 songs, including a collaboration with English music producer Moody Good.

=== 2021–2024 ===
In 2021, Subtronics launched his first-ever Cyclops Cove, a one-day event with a single stage, and played at Red Rocks 2021, which was the venue’s first full-capacity event following COVID-19 restrictions.

In 2022, Subtronics released his album Fractals. The album was released by his own recording label, Cyclops Recordings. The album itself encompasses several EDM genres.

Then in 2023, he released his album Antifractals. The album remixes each song from the original Fractals album and some of his prior hits. These remixes were done by both Subtronics himself as well as other artists such as Peekaboo, Sullivan King, Zeds Dead, and his wife Level Up. The album reached number 4 on the Dance Charts as well as had over 50 million streams. Then he inked a Live Nation tour deal for the sold-out Antifractal Tour and also sold out the Kia Forum in Los Angeles.

On February 16, 2024, Kardon officially released his 2nd full length album coined "Tesseract"; the album contains many collaboration with other artists, such as Excision, Rezz, Grabbitz and HOL!. The album consists of 16 songs. He launched the Tesseract tour, headlining major arenas such as Barclays Center, Cable Dahmer Arena, and State Farm Arena. Cyclops Cove expanded to a three-day event, and Subtronics was named Beatport's top-selling artist of the year. He also delivered a production at the Tacoma Dome and made his main stage debut at EDC Las Vegas. Kardon has been a winner at DJ Mag North America's 'DJ of the Year' 2023 and a three-time winner of Dubstep Artist of the Year.

=== 2025–present ===
On March 29, 2025, Kardon officially announced a two-part album on his social media platforms, Fibonacci. The first part, Oblivion, was released on April 4, 2025. The EP contained the single "Final Breath", a collaboration with English singer and artist A Little Sound.

Subtronics recently announced part one of a new album series, Fibonacci Part 1: Oblivion, during his mainstage debut at Ultra Music Festival. This was the first installment of a two-part series in the album. He also kicked off his first-ever Las Vegas residency at Wynn Las Vegas. Subtronics sold out six nights at the Shrine Expo Hall in Los Angeles, which was the second-highest number of shows ever held at the venue.

== Discography ==
=== Albums and extended plays ===
Title	Details
3K Free EP	Released: February 21, 2015; Label: Self-released; Formats: Digital download
Panic Attack EP	Released: May 4, 2015; Label: Prime Audio; Formats: Digital download
Impact	Released: January 18, 2016; Label: Blacklight Audio; Formats: Digital download
Cyclops EP	Released: December 6, 2016; Label: Prime Audio; Formats: Digital download
20K EP	Released: June 8, 2017; Label: Self-released; Formats: Digital download
Depth Perception	Released: January 15, 2018; Label: SubCarbon Records; Formats: Digital download
Thermal Expansion EP	Released: February 23, 2018; Label: Disciple; Formats: Digital download
Wook Laser EP	Released: March 4, 2018; Label: Never Say Die; Formats: Digital download
Pashmina Death Sauce EP	Released: September 26, 2018; Label: Kannibalen Records; Formats: Digital download
Cyclops Army	Released: June 7, 2019; Label: Cyclops Recordings; Formats: Digital download
Wooked on Tronics	Released: October 2, 2019; Label: Cyclops Recordings; Formats: Digital download
Scream Saver	Released: April 10, 2020; Label: Cyclops Recordings; Formats: Digital download
String Theory	Released: October 9, 2020; Label: Cyclops Recordings; Formats: Digital download
Fractals	Released: January 14, 2022; Label: Cyclops Recordings; Formats: Digital download
Antifractals	Released: December 16, 2022; Label: Cyclops Recordings; Formats: Digital download
Tesseract	Released: February 16, 2024; Label: Cyclops Recordings; Formats: Digital download
Fibonacci Part 1: Oblivion	Released: April 4, 2025; Label: Cyclops Recordings; Formats: Digital download

==== As a featured artist ====
Title	Details
Genius by JPhelpz	Released: May 19, 2014; Label: Prime Audio; Format: Digital download
20K EP by Bommer	Released: May 5, 2015; Label: Self-released; Format: Digital download
Ripper EP by Creation	Released: October 10, 2015; Label: Uplink Audio; Format: Digital download
Double U EP by Ubur	Released: June 15, 2018; Label: Never Say Die; Format: Digital download
Soul'd Out by Boogie T	Released: October 23, 2017; Label: SubCarbon Records; Format: Digital download
Junkworld EP by Svdden Death	Released: February 26, 2018; Label: Never Say Die; Format: Digital download
2KFO by Boogie T	Released: June 15, 2018; Label: Drama Club Recordings; Format: Digital download
Transcendency by PhaseOne	Released: April 17, 2019; Label: Disciple; Format: Digital download
Bangers[2].zip by GRiZ	Released: August 14, 2019; Label: Deadbeats; Format: Digital download

=== Charted songs ===
Title	Year	Peak chart positions	Album
Title	Year	US Dance	Album
"Griztronics"	2019	9	Bangers[2].Zip
"Into Pieces" (featuring Grabbitz)	2022	37	Fractals
"Tuba Demon"	2022	43	Fractals
"Womp Portal" (with Ganja White Night)	2023	33	Non-album singles
"Black Ice" (with Rezz)	2024	41	Non-album singles
"Amnesia"	2024	49	Non-album singles
"Got Away" (with Illenium featuring Royal & the Serpent)	2025	24	Non-album singles

=== Other singles ===
Title	Year	Album	Label
"Cataclysm"	2013	Non-album singles	Ordinance Records
"Citadel" (featuring Imperium (Wa))	2014	Non-album singles	Riot Audio
"Buckshot" (featuring Imperium (Wa))	2014	Non-album singles	MultiKill Recordings
"Childs Play VIP"	2015	Non-album singles	Self-released
"Suspekt" (with Dack Janiels)	2015	Non-album singles	Artist Intelligence Agency
"Madness" (with SampliFire and Zaita)	2015	Non-album singles	Artist Intelligence Agency
"Nightmare"	2016	Non-album singles	DirtySnatcha Records
"Spasm"	2016	Non-album singles	Self-released
"Astrofang"	2016	Non-album singles	Self-released
"Saw Blade" (with Ecraze)	2016	Non-album singles	Self-released
"Trendz" (with Dack Janiels, featuring GloGangTwins)	2016	Non-album singles	Self-released
"Pete's Song" (with Ubur)	2016	Non-album singles	Self-released
"Spasm VIP"	2016	Cyclops	Prime Audio
"Wonderwall"	2016	Non-album singles	Self-released
"Shredder" (with Emilian Wonk)	2016	Non-album singles	Self-released
"Skank"	2017	Non-album singles	Kill Your Ego
"Negative Space"	2017	Non-album singles	Self-released
"LDA" (with Run DMT)	2017	Non-album singles	Kill Your Ego
"Liberator VIP"	2017	Non-album singles	Self-released
"Revenge of the Goldfish" (with Midnight Tyrannosaurus)	2017	Black Friday Vol. 6	Never Say Die
"Two Faced" (with Skenz)	2017	Non-album single	Self-released
"Hallucination Dub"	2017	Loud Speaker, Vol. 1	SubCarbon Records
"Particle Meme Weapon"	2017	Non-album singles	Self-released
"Shock Value"	2017	Non-album singles	Self-released
"Thunderdome" (with Squnto)	2018	Non-album singles	Self-released
"Omega Robot" (with Space Jesus)	2018	Non-album singles	Deadbeats
"Headband" (with Ganja White Night)	2019	Non-album singles	SubCarbon Records
"Bounce" (with Rusko)	2019	Non-album singles	Cyclops Recordings
"Snailclops" (with Snails)	2019	Non-album singles	Slugz Music
"Step Aside" (with Midnight Tyrannosaurus)	2019	Non-album singles	Bassrush
"Braincase" (with Kayzo)	2019	Non-album singles	Welcome Records / Cyclops Recordings
"Bumpy Teeth" (with Zeds Dead)	2019	We Are Deadbeats Vol. 4	Deadbeats
"Nuclear Bass Face" (with Nghtmre)	2020	Non-album singles	Ultra Records
"Bunker Buster" (with Excision)	2021	Non-album singles	Subsidia Records
"Resist" (with Ace Aura)	2021	Planet Cyclops	Cyclops Recordings
"House Party" (with Marshmello)	2021	Shockwave	Joytime Collective
"Gravity" (with Slander and JT Roach)	2021	Non-album singles	Gud Vibrations / Cyclops Recordings
"Electric Noodle Soup" (with Ubur)	2021	Non-album singles	Cyclops Recordings
"Griztronics II (Another Level)" (with Griz)	2021	FRACTALS	Cyclops Recordings
"Spacetime" (featuring Nevve)	2021	FRACTALS	Cyclops Recordings
"Gassed Up" (with Zeds Dead featuring Flowdan)	2022	FRACTALS	Deadbeats / Cyclops Recordings
"Puzzle Box" (with Rezz)	2022	Non-album singles	Deadbeats / Cyclops Recordings
"Final Breath" (with A Little Sound)	2025	Fibonacci Part 1: Oblivion	Deadbeats / Cyclops Recordings

=== Remixes ===
Title	Year	Artist	Label
Brooklyn Go Hard	2013	Jay-Z	Self-released
Genius (with Obridium)	2014	JPhelpz	Self-released
Thief	2016	Ookay	Self-released
The Wonky Song	2017	Monxx and Walter Wilde	Self-released
Walls	2018	Eliminate	Disciple
2KFO	2018	Boogie T	Drama Club Recordings
Lights Go Down	2018	Zeds Dead and Jauz	Bite This & Deadbeats
WTF	2018	Herobust	Busted Records
Vault	2019	Excision	Excision Music
GodLovesUgly (with Zeds Dead)	2020	Atmosphere	Deadbeats & Rhymesayers
Do It To It	2022	ACRAZE	Thrive Music
Escape	2022	Kx5, deadmau5, Kaskade, HAYLA	mau5trap Recordings Limited
Runaway (U & I)	2022	Galantis	Big Beat Records
It's Our Destiny	2023	IMANU	Deadbeats
Black Out Days	2023	Phantogram	Universal Records
Touhou Riddim	2024	Virtual Riot	Disciple
Gas Pedal Remix (with John Summit and Tape B)	2024	Sage The Gemini	Experts Only & Darkroom Records
Fuck The Whole World	2026	Oliver Tree	Atlantic

== Awards and nominations ==
=== Accolades ===
Year	Publisher	Country	Accolade	Rank
2019	Billboard	United States	Next Big Sound	10
2023	Electronic Dance Music Awards (EDMA)	International	Dubstep Artist of The Year	1
