= Ace Aura =

American DJ and music producer

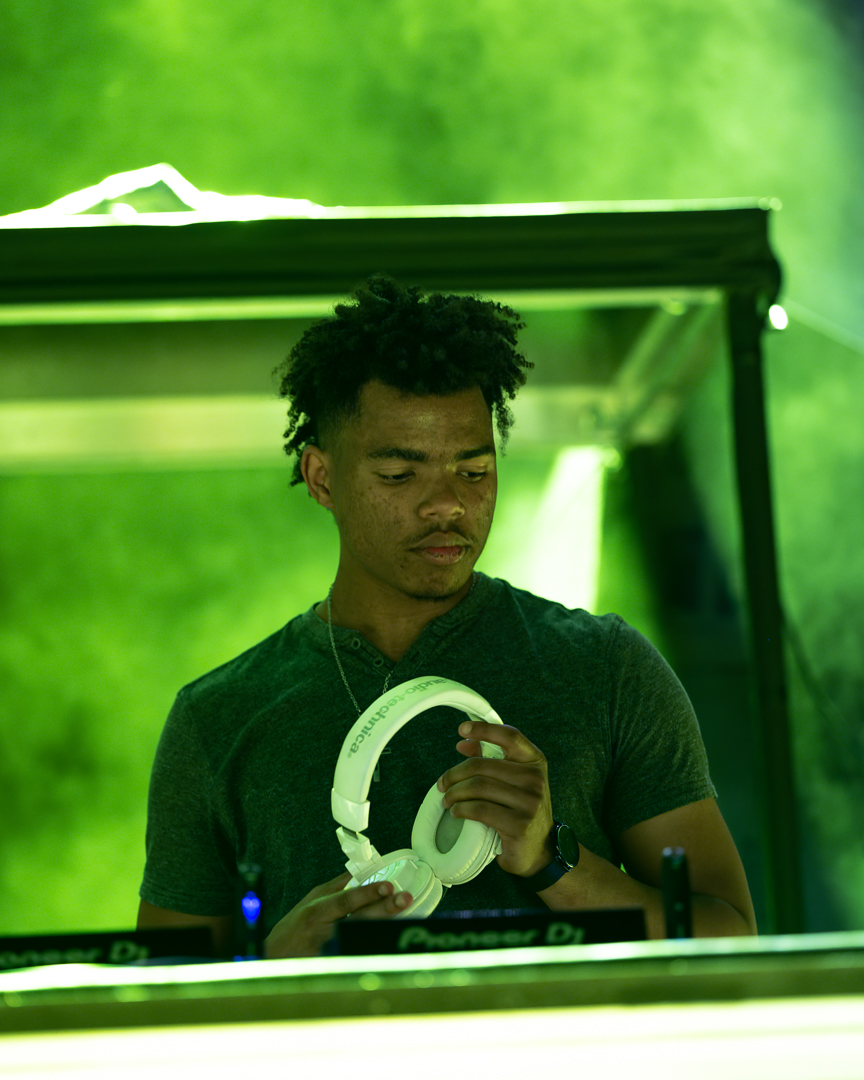
- Ace Aura in 2021

Background information
- Born: Eric Joshua Seall; September 10, 1998 (age 28); Plano, Texas, U.S.
- Origin: McKinney, Texas, U.S.
- Genres: Dubstep; riddim; brostep; trap; hardwave; hardstyle; drum and bass; bass house; electro house; CEDM
- Occupations: DJ; music producer
- Years active: 2012–present
- Labels: Monstercat; Circus; Buygore; Dim Mak; Ophelia; The Arcadium; Lowly; Bassrush; Never Say Die; Disciple; Disciple Round Table; Proximity; Cyclops Recordings; Rushdown; Ninety9Lives; Crystallize; Odio Records; Most Addictive; Stratos Union; artbyFORM; Daily Earfood; Apostle Records; Maverick's Playlist; Drop It Network

Eric Joshua Seall (born September 10, 1998), known professionally as Ace Aura, is an American DJ, music producer and remixer from McKinney, Texas. He is known as a pioneer of the melodic riddim subgenre, which is characterized by the minimalistic rhythmic elements of riddim, with a heavy emphasis on chords, melodies and experimental sounds. He has released five EPs, along with numerous singles and official remixes for record labels including Monstercat, Circus Records, Dim Mak Records, Buygore, Ophelia Records, Lowly, Disciple and Never Say Die Records. He has performed at music festivals and venues across North America and Australia, including Electric Zoo, Banc of California Stadium, Legend Valley, Red Rocks Amphitheater, Bill Graham Civic Auditorium, the Great Saltair, the Hollywood Palladium, the Mission Ballroom and the Ogden Theatre.

== Background ==
Eric Seall was born on September 10, 1998, in Plano, Texas. He was raised in a Protestant household in McKinney and attended church regularly. He started playing drums at the age of 8 and played with his church's youth group band, which was his first experience performing music publicly.

He was introduced to electronic music in eighth grade when his friend showed him the Dirtyphonics remix of "Scary Monsters and Nice Sprites" by Skrillex during lunch. This event prompted him to learn how to make dubstep, using a demo version of Pro Tools he had received for Christmas.

He is a devout Christian and has said that his faith is a central part of the way he writes music. His EP Reset_Environment is inspired by the Book of Revelation.

In 2020, he graduated from the University of Texas at Dallas with a Bachelor of Computer Science.

== Career ==
Seall posted his first song, "Rise of the Angels," to his Bandcamp page on November 18, 2012, with a PWYW digital download option. He continued to release music in that same fashion until March 9, 2016, when he self-released his single "Metamorphosis" on all streaming platforms.

In July 2017, he joined a remix competition for the song "Wait for Me" by British DJ and producer Chime, in which his entry won second place. On April 19, 2018, Seall released his debut EP Exodus on Ninety9Lives. Chime signed Seall's song "Ensnared" and EP Guided Wandering to his record label Rushdown, and collaborated with him on a remix of "Wet Napkin" by Ray Volpe in 2018. In November of the same year, Seall accused Kentucky producer Joshua Gleason of allegedly stealing the remix and releasing it as his own song under the moniker thesourwarhead, which Gleason later denied in a statement on his Facebook page.

He released his third EP Comatose on February 21, 2020. In April 2020, he collaborated with Millennial Trash on the song "Noddin'," which was placed in several editorial playlists on Spotify. On August 12, 2020, his song "Another Heart," which he produced with Skybreak and Sharks in under 24 hours, was released on artbyFORM's All Nighter Vol. 5 compilation, with all proceeds from streams and digital sales being donated to Doctors Without Borders. On August 28, 2020, he released his fourth EP Reset_Environment through Disciple Round Table, as well as a remix of the Riot Ten and Whales song "Save You" through Steve Aoki's Dim Mak Records. On November 27, 2020, he released his song "Waiting" on Borgore's Buygore imprint.

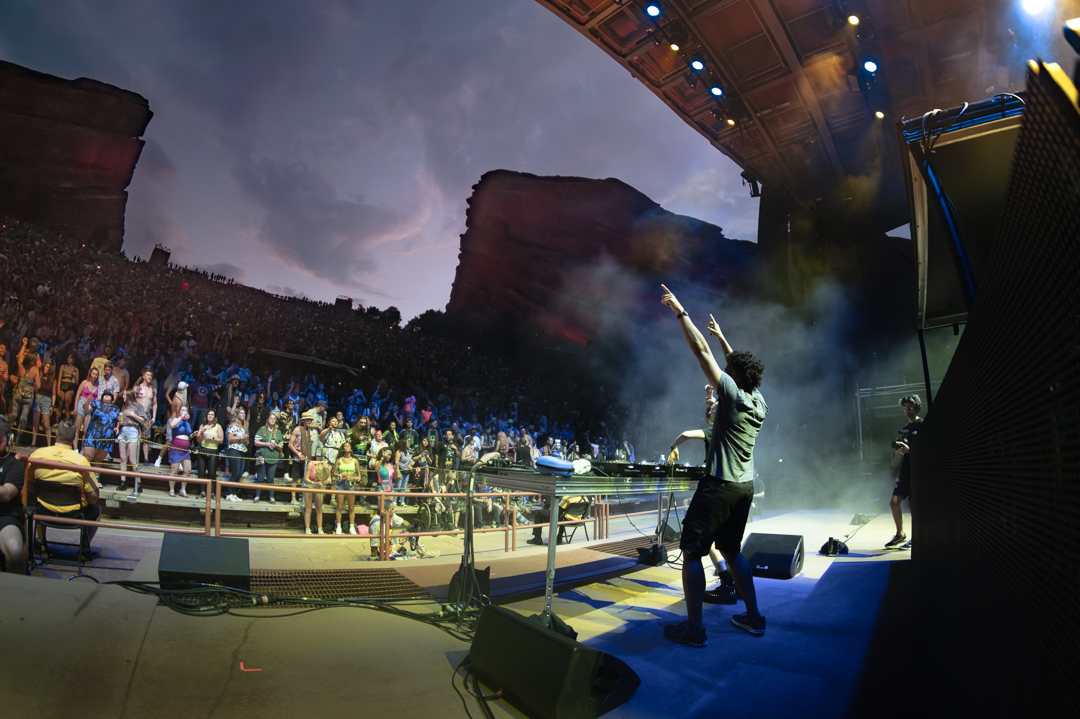
Ace Aura performing at Red Rocks Amphitheatre in 2021

He released his Monstercat debut single "Stay" with Tynan on January 11, 2021. On March 4, 2021, he released Comatose: Awakening, an album containing six remixes of songs from the Comatose EP and a new original song titled "Adrenaline." On April 9, 2021, he released another remix album titled The Noddin' Remixes No One Asked For, which featured 12 remixes of "Noddin'," along with a sequel to the song, dubbed "Noddin' 2." In May 2021, he collaborated with Chime on a Splice sample pack titled Melodic Riddim Vol. 1, which debuted at #1 on the site's "weekly top packs" chart and remained there for four consecutive weeks. On May 7, 2021, he released the song "Resist" with Subtronics. The following month, he supported Subtronics at Red Rocks Amphitheatre and performed "Resist" on stage with him. He self-released his song "Cyber Cuddle" on June 4, 2021. On June 24, 2021, he released his collaboration with Crankdat, titled "The Feeling," on Monstercat. On August 20, 2021, he released his fifth EP Gem World through Never Say Die. The EP's title track was played in DJ sets by Skrillex, Slander, Nghtmre, DJ Diesel, Flosstradamus and Valentino Khan. On September 20, 2021, he put out his first solo Monstercat release, "Destiny." On September 27, 2021, he performed at Excision's Lost Lands festival. On December 10, 2021, he released the single "Falling for You" with Slippy on Insomniac's Bassrush imprint, as well as his remix of "Just Like You" by Kompany.

On February 24, 2022, he released his fourth Monstercat single "Umbra," featuring vocals from German electronic artist Voicians. According to Seall, the song was originally a remix of "Blue Shadows" by Xilent, but it was adapted into an original so it could be released officially. He collaborated with Virus Syndicate on the song "Level" from their Resistance EP, which released on April 15, 2022. On May 13, 2022, he returned to Rushdown to release a VIP remix of "Tongues of Fire." On June 24, 2022, he debuted on Seven Lions' Ophelia imprint alongside Nytrix with the single "Echoes," a followup to their 2021 collaboration "Shattered." In July 2022, he traveled to Australia for his first international tour, performing in Sydney, Mackay, Perth and Brisbane. On July 7, 2022, he released an official remix of Boombox Cartel and Moody Good's song "Shadow" featuring Calivania. On July 17, 2022, he announced his sixth EP Revive through a substitution cipher within a cryptic video he posted to social media. The EP released on July 22, 2022, via Ophelia and included the single "Echoes," as well as three new songs. On July 29, 2022, he released a remix of the song "It Was You" by Said the Sky and We the Kings on the former's Sentiment (The Remixes) album, which also included remixes by Autograf, Elohim, We Are Fury, Blanke and Nurko.

On January 26, 2023, he released his seventh EP Crystal Coalition through Circus Records. The EP consists of four songs and was his first EP to be composed entirely of collaborations, with Beastboi, Mikesh!ft, Skybreak, SpaceYeti and Phocust all featuring on the EP.

== Discography ==
=== Extended plays ===
Title	Information
Exodus	Released: April 9, 2018; Label: Ninety9Lives; Formats: Digital download
Guided Wandering	Released: June 29, 2018; Label: Rushdown; Formats: Digital download
Comatose	Released: February 21, 2020; Label: Circus Records; Formats: Digital download
Reset_Environment	Released: August 28, 2020; Label: Disciple Round Table; Formats: Digital download
Gem World	Released: August 20, 2021; Label: Never Say Die; Formats: Digital download
Revive	Released: July 22, 2022; Label: Ophelia Records; Formats: Digital download
Crystal Coalition	Released: January 26, 2023; Label: Circus Records; Formats: Digital download
Eternal	Released: June 21, 2024; Label: Monstercat; Formats: Digital Download
Ephemeral	Released: October 18, 2024; Label: Disciple; Formats: Digital Download

=== Remix albums ===
Title	Information
Comatose: Awakening	Released: March 4, 2021; Label: Circus Records; Formats: Digital download
The Noddin' Remixes No One Asked For (with Millennial Trash)	Released: April 9, 2021; Label: Most Addictive; Formats: Digital download

=== Singles ===
Title	Year	Album	Label
"Metamorphosis"	2016	Non-album singles	Self-released
"Redemption"	2016	Non-album singles	Self-released
"Exploration"	2016	Non-album singles	Self-released
"Push and Pull"	2016	Non-album singles	Self-released
"Anthem"	2017	Non-album singles	Self-released
"Transmutation"	2017	Non-album singles	Self-released
"Ensnared"	2018	Non-album singles	Rushdown
"Baguette Bois"	2018	Non-album singles	Drop It Network
"Metamorphosis (VIP Mix)"	2018	Non-album singles	Self-released
"Kingdom" (with Kotori)	2018	Non-album singles	Self-released
"Bagel Bois"	2018	Non-album singles	Drop It Network
"Tongues of Fire"	2018	Non-album singles	Rushdown
"Desired By Demons"	2018	Non-album singles	Maverick's Playlist
"Flow"	2019	Non-album singles	Apostle Records
"Kaleidoscope"	2019	Non-album singles	Rushdown
"Nucleus"	2019	Non-album singles	Rushdown
"Stars" (with Oolacile)	2019	Non-album singles	Self-released
"Coma"	2019	Comatose	Circus Records
"Self-Love" (with Trinergy)	2020	Comatose	Circus Records
"Sum Buddy" (with Dr. Ozi)	2020	Non-album singles	Stratos Union
"Stay" (with Tynan)	2021	Non-album singles	Monstercat
"Resist" (with Subtronics)	2021	Non-album singles	Cyclops Recordings
"Cyber Cuddle"	2021	Non-album singles	Crystallize
"Destiny"	2021	Non-album singles	Monstercat
"Falling for You" (with Slippy)	2021	Non-album singles	Bassrush
"Umbra" (with Voicians)	2022	Non-album singles	Monstercat
"Echoes" (with Nytrix)	2022	Revive	Ophelia Records
"Say It" (with SpaceYeti)	2022	Crystal Coalition	Circus Records
"Speedrun" (with Skybreak)	2022	Crystal Coalition	Circus Records
"Vibrance" (with Beastboi and Mikesh!ft)	2023	Crystal Coalition	Circus Records
"I'll Be Waiting" (with NAZAAR and Dani King)	2023	Non-album single	Monstercat
"Arcadia" (with Pixel Terror)	2023	Non-album single	Monstercat
"WAIT4U" (with Deadcrow) (featuring Roniit)	2023	Non-album single	Monstercat

=== As a featured artist ===
Title	Year	Album	Label
"Battle for Eternity" by Everen Maxwell (featuring Ace Aura)	2019	Non-album singles	The Arcadium
"Interdimensional" by Chime (with Ace Aura)	2019	Interdimensional	Disciple
"Noddin'" by Millennial Trash (with Ace Aura)	2020	Losing My Mind	Daily Earfood
"Miracle" by Trinergy (with Ace Aura)	2020	Miracle / Bye	Disciple
"The Feeling" by Crankdat (with Ace Aura)	2021	Sad Robot	Monstercat
"Level" by Virus Syndicate (with Ace Aura)	2022	Resistance	Disciple
"Brand New Love" by Nghtmre (with Ace Aura) (featuring Marlhy)	2024	Unsound 2	Gud Vibrations

=== On a compilation ===
Title	Year	Album	Label
"Gamma"	2019	Untapped Vol. 2	Odio Records
"Radiate"	2019	Issue 4	Odio Records
"Lover" (with Ipsiom)	2020	Colour Bass Vol. 1	Rushdown
"Glass Cannon"	2020	Round Table Reinforcements Vol. 1	Disciple Round Table
"Another Heart" (with Skybreak and Sharks)	2020	All Nighter Vol. 5	artbyFORM
"Rise"	2020	Afterlife Vol. 1	Disciple
"Waiting"	2020	Royal Blood	Fresh Blood
"Tongues of Fire (VIP)"	2022	Rushdown 100	Rushdown

=== Remixes ===
Title	Year	Artist	Label
"Fade"	2015	Holly Drummond	Self-released
"Live for the Drop"	2016	Capital Kings	Self-released
"Hash It Out"	2016	Dicelate	Self-released
"Hold Me"	2016	Copperknob and R'embe	Self-released
"Wait for Me"	2017	Chime	Daily Earfood
"Miss You"	2017	Fox Stevenson	Self-released
"Crystallize" (featuring Ashley Apollodor)	2018	Umperia	Self-released
"It's Lit"	2018	Andy Mas and Blud Brothers	Self-released
"Wet Napkin" (with Chime)	2018	Ray Volpe	Self-released
"Flame"	2018	Copperknob	Self-released
"The Beauty & the Lazergun" (with Phocust)	2018	Panda Eyes	Self-released
"Into the Light" (featuring Sarah Hudson)	2018	Snails	Self-released
"Bzzrk"	2018	Svdden Death and AFK	Self-released
"Take a Fall"	2018	The Brig, Rob Gasser and Ashley Apollodor	Most Addictive
"Whirlwind"	2019	Chime	Rushdown
"Need U More" (featuring Sara Skinner)	2019	Ykes	Self-released
"The Great Deception"	2019	PsoGnar	Most Addictive
"Crash & Burn" (featuring Northlane)	2019	PhaseOne	Self-released
"Only Now" (featuring Tyler Graves)	2020	Seven Lions	Self-released
"Save You" (featuring Megan Stokes)	2020	Riot Ten and Whales	Dim Mak Records
"Blindspot"	2021	Nurko and Devon Baldwin	Proximity
"Habitat"	2021	12th Planet	Self-released
"Just Like You" (featuring KC)	2021	Kompany	Never Say Die
"Shadow" (featuring Calivania)	2022	Boombox Cartel and Moody Good	Create Music Group
"It Was You"	2022	Said the Sky and We the Kings	Lowly
"Can't Let You Go" (featuring Rynn)	2022	Armnhmr and Abandoned	Monstercat
"Last One Standing"	2022	Zomboy and Must Die!	Rott N' Roll Records
"Underwater" (featuring Hatsune Miku)	2023	Hylen	Crypton Future Media
"Threshold"	2023	Nghtmre	Lowly
