= 12th Planet (musician) =

American DJ and producer

Background information
- Also known as: Infiltrata
- Born: John Christopherk Dadzie; June 7, 1982 (age 44); Los Angeles County, California, U.S.
- Origin: Los Angeles, California, United States
- Genres: Dubstep, jungle, drum and bass, trap
- Occupations: DJ, record producer
- Years active: 2006 - Present
- Labels: Disciple; Disciple Round Table; Never Say Die; OWSLA; SMOG
- Website: 12thplanet.komi.io

John Christopherk Dadzie (born June 7, 1982), better known by his stage names 12th Planet and Infiltrata, is an American DJ and dubstep producer from Los Angeles (LA). He was the head A&R for SMOG Records and Disciple Records' sublabel: Disciple Round Table.

== Biography ==
Dadzie grew up in South Los Angeles, the youngest of four children. Dadzie attended and graduated from Loyola High School in 2000; Dadzie played on the school's basketball and volleyball teams. He was first introduced to the electronic music scene in high school. After forming Imperial Recordings with DJ Lith, he launched his production skills on his own terms, originally producing drum and bass under the alias Infiltrata. In 2006, he decided that he was going to make dubstep. It was then that his new alias 12th Planet was created, in reference to Zecharia Sitchin's book, 12th Planet. All production under the name 12th Planet is original. As one of the first individuals to bring the dubstep culture to the US (LA in particular), 12th Planet has frequently been cited as the "General of the Riddim Gang".

12th Planet worked frequently with Orange County producer Flinch and LA Local Skrillex (on tracks "Needed Change", "Father Said", and "Burst" along Kill The Noise). He has also collaborated with various dubstep producers including Datsik, Doctor P, Plastician, Virtual Riot and Skream. Many well-known dubstep DJs (such as Rusko, Skream, Skrillex and more) use 12th Planet's productions and remixes in their live DJ sets.

As a DJ, 12th Planet has toured globally in London, Sydney, Auckland, and across the US. He has also played at many American dance festivals such as Electric Daisy Carnival, Together As One, SXSW, Coachella Valley Music and Arts Festival, Ultra Music Festival, Nocturnal, and Beyond Wonderland. He is represented by AM Only: one of the largest agencies in the electronic music industry.

In 2007, 12th Planet helped in the relaunch and rebranding of SMOG Records, which was previously an event production company, and has since been its head. In 2009, 12th Planet was listed as one of URB.com's "Next 100", and had a special feature in their 25 Now! supplemental issue. 2010 marked the release of his music video for "Reasons", presented by Scion A/V, which was premiered and cycled on MTV 2. Diplo's label Mad Decent included 12th Planet's remix of Little Jinder's "Youth Blood" on their dubstep compilation "Blow Your Head", released in November. 12th Planet has also been described by Skrillex as Skrillex's Mentor at a show at Ultra Music.

12th Planet finished in 20th place in the 2013 America's Best DJ competition-a vote and promotion to find out the country's most popular DJ conducted by DJ Times magazine and Pioneer DJ.

In 2017, he signed with Disciple Recordings, becoming the head of the sub-label Disciple Round Table.

== Discography ==
=== Albums ===
- 2012 SMOG 023 - The End Album
- 2020 Disciple 215 - Swamplex: Next Level Album

=== Extended plays ===
- 2008 RedVolume - 28 Hours Later EP
- 2008 SMOG 001 - Smokescreen EP
- 2008 SMOG 002 - Ptera Patrick EP
- 2008 BASSHEAD 001 - Control EP (with Emu)
- 2008 SMOG 004 - 68 / Be Blatant EP
- 2008 Subconscious Recordings - Spliff Politics EP
- 2008 Argon - Element 16 (Sulfur) EP
- 2008 Noppa Recordings - Tonka EP
- 2009 10 Bag Records - C-Sick / Are Ya Feelin EP (with Emu)
- 2009 SMOG 005 - Texx Mars EP (with Datsik)
- 2010 Bullet Train Records - Reasons EP
- 2012 SMOG Records - The End Is Near EP
- 2013 SMOG 035 - Transitions EP (with Protohype)
- 2016 SMOG 074 - Gully Squad EP
- 2017 Disciple Recordings - Let Us Prey EP
- 2018 Disciple Recordings - Swamplex Terrestrial EP
- 2019 Disciple Recordings - Swamplex ExtraTerrestrial EP

=== Singles ===
- 2011 SMOG 007 - Westside Dub (with Plastician)
- 2011 Dub Police - Purple & Gold (with Antiserum)
- 2011 SMOG 009 - Lootin 92 (with SPL)
- 2011 SMOG 011 - Who Are We?
- 2013 SMOG 027 - Whoops/Murdaaa single (with Mayhem)
- 2016 SMOG 070 - Name Bran (with LUMBERJVCK)
- 2017 Knights of the Round Table Vol.1 - Send It Single (with Barely Alive and PhaseOne)
- 2018 Disciple Alliance Vol.4 - Slaughter Them All Single (with PhaseOne)
- 2018 Disciple Alliance Vol.4 - Get Lemon Single (with Barely Alive, Dodge & Fuski, Eliminate, Fox Stevenson, Hatcha, Modestep, Myro, Oolacile, Panda Eyes, PhaseOne, Truth and Virtual Riot)
- 2018 Disciple Round Table - Bongo Boi Single (with Oolacile)
- 2019 Disciple Round Table - Bubzstep Single (with Barely Alive and PhaseOne)
- 2019 Disciple Alliance Vol.5 - Rubber Band Boiz (with Bandlez)
- 2019 Disciple Alliance Vol.5 - We Don't Play Single (with INFEKT, Barely Alive, Samplifire, Bandlez, Virtual Riot, MVRDA, PhaseOne, Dodge & Fuski, 12thPlanet, Dirtyphonics, Oliverse, Eliminate, Fox Stevenson, Modestep, Terravita, Chibs)
- 2020 Disciple Alliance Vol.6 - How We Roll (with Samplifire, Modestep, Eliminate, Barely Alive, Oliverse, Virtual Riot, Bandlez, Dirtyphonics, Graphyt, Ecraze, PhaseOne, INFEKT, Chibs, MVRDA, Dodge & Fuski, Myro, Terravita, Fox Stevenson, Virus Syndicate)
- 2020 Disciple Alliance Vol.6 - Follow (with Katie Sky)

=== Mix compilations ===
- 2010 MISHKA Keep Watch Volume XXI

=== Remixes ===
- 2009 Grand Puba - Get It (12th Planet Remix) [Scion A/V]
- 2009 Dave Nada - Apocalypse Theme (12th Planet and Flinch Remix) [Tits & Acid]
- 2009 Little Jinder - Youth Blood (12th Planet and Flinch Remix) [Trouble & Bass]
- 2009 Ladybox - Cookies Fly (12th Planet and Flinch Remix) [Party Like Us]
- 2010 Villains featuring Whiskey Pete - Victims (12th Planet and Flinch Remix) [Dim Mak]
- 2010 Le Castle Vania - Nobody Gets Out Alive (12th Planet and Flinch Remix) [Always Never]
- 2010 Rusko featuring Amber Coffman - Hold On (12th Planet Remix) [Mad Decent]
- 2010 DJ Sneak - Southern Boy (12th Planet and Flinch Remix) [Scion A/V]
- 2010 Rye Rye featuring M.I.A. - Sunshine (12th Planet Remix) [Interscope]
- 2010 MSTRKRFT - Heartbreaker (12th Planet and Flinch Remix)
- 2011 Skrillex featuring Penny - All I Ask of You (12th Planet Remix)
- 2011 Echo Park - Fiber Optic (12th Planet and Flinch Remix)
- 2012 Foreign Beggars featuring Donae'o - Flying To Mars (12th Planet's Martian Trapstep Remix) [mau5trap]
- 2012 Dirtyphonics - Dirty (12th Planet Remix) [Dim Mak]
- 2013 Felguk - Slice & Dice (12th Planet Remix)
- 2013 Pretty Lights - Go Down Sunshine (12th Planet Remix)
- 2016 Pegboard Nerds - Heartbit (12th Planet Remix)
- 2018 What So Not and San Holo featuring Daniel Johns - If You Only Knew (12th Planet Remix)
- 2019 Excision and Sullivan King - Wake Up (12th Planet remix)
- 2021 AC Slater and Bleu Clair featuring Kate Wild - Green Light (12th Planet Remix)

=== Other appearances ===
- 2010 Dubsteppers for Haiti Volume 3
- 2010 SMOG Scion CD Sampler V.30

=== As featured artist ===
- 2010 Skrillex - "Needed Change" from the release Skrillex Presents Free Treats Volume 001.
- 2011 Skrillex - "Right On Time" (collaboration with Skrillex and Kill the Noise) from the EP Bangarang.
- 2011 Korn - "Way Too Far" (featured with Kill the Noise) from the album The Path of Totality.
- 2013 Protohype - "Like This" (collaboration with Protohype) from the EP Speak No Evil.
