= Ragamuffin =

Ragamuffin or Raggamuffin is a euphemism for a child of the street. The term may also refer to:

== Film ==
- The Ragamuffin, a 1916 American silent film by William C. deMille
- Ragamuffin, a 2014 film directed by David Schultz about Rich Mullins

== Music ==
- Raggamuffin music, or ragga, a reggae and dancehall subgenre
- Raggamuffin Music Festival, an annual touring festival in Australia and New Zealand
- Stephen Marley (musician) (born 1972), nicknamed Raggamuffin, Jamaican-American reggae musician
- "Raggamuffin" (song), a 2010 song by Selah Sue
- "Raggamuffin", a 2019 song by Koffee from Rapture
- Ragamuffin, a 1920 piano composition from London Pieces by John Ireland

== Other uses ==
- Ragamuffin (novel), a 2007 novel by Tobias S. Buckell
- Ragamuffin cat, a breed of domestic cat
- Ragamuffin, a series of Australian racing yachts run by Syd Fischer
- Ragamuffin, a character in the comic book series Lenore, the Cute Little Dead Girl
- Ragamuffins, an English term for the farrapos in the Ragamuffin War in Rio Grande do Sul, Brazil, 1835–1845
- Lumpenproletariat, a Marxist term for a subsection of the underclass
