= Datsik =

Datsik may refer to:

- Viacheslav Datsik (born 1980), Russian MMA fighter and neo-Nazi
- Datsik (musician) (born 1988), Canadian dubstep DJ and music producer
