= Herobust =

American electronic music producer

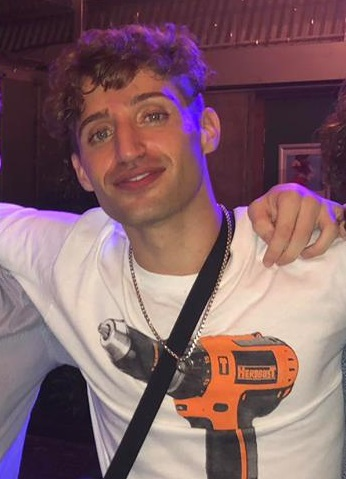
- Herobust in 2018

Background information
- Born: Hayden Jerome Kramer; July 10, 1987 (age 38); Atlanta, Georgia, U.S.
- Genres: Trap; bass; dubstep; riddim
- Occupations: DJ; producer
- Years active: 2011–present
- Labels: Busted; Mad Decent; OWSLA; Never Say Die; SATURATE!
- Website: www.herobust.com

Hayden Jerome Kramer (born July 10, 1987), better known by his stage name Herobust, is an American record producer and DJ. His hip-hop inspired bass music quickly garnered the attention of online media giants such as Rolling Stone, Vice, The Huffington Post and MTV.

== Career ==
Herobust grew up in a family of doctors and became an undergraduate at the University of Georgia. After learning that his passion in music was much more rewarding, he pursued a musical career in record production.

Herobust's first releases were on the German web-label Saturate Records.

Herobust's I'm Aloud EP peaked at #22 on the Billboard "Top Dance/Electronic Albums" on February 13, 2016.

In February 2017, Herobust released the EP Vertebreaker. Several months later, a remix EP was released, featuring remixers such as JSTJR, Protohype, Yultron, 4B, Hydraulix and Willy Joy. In July 2017, he collaborated with Monxx to release the single "Giant Squiddim". In August 2017, he released "First Person Shooter" as a single. In September 2017, he released the single "Debt N 'Eight". Rap duo Outkast has been cited as a musical influence by Herobust.

In December 2017, "Blockbuster" was released as a single by Herobust.

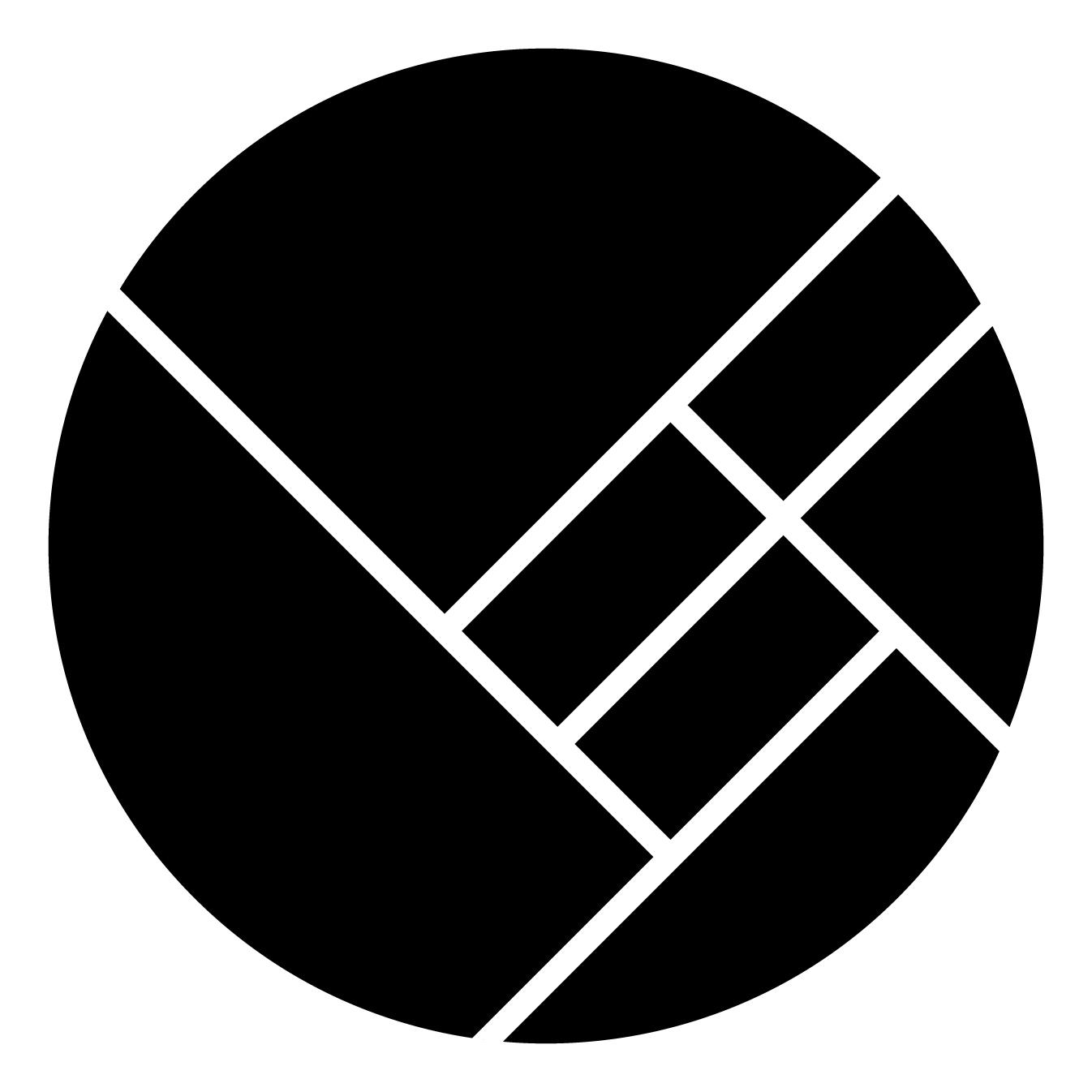

== Discography ==
=== Extended plays ===
Title	Details	Peak chart positions
Title	Details	US Dance
I'm Aloud	Released: January 22, 2016; Label: Mad Decent; Format: Digital download, CD	22
Vertebreaker	Released: February 8, 2017; Label: Mad Decent; Format: Digital download	—

=== Singles ===
2014

- "Pump This" (with Snails)
- "Party McFly"

2016

- "No Time" (with LAXX)

2017

- "Giant Squiddim" (with Monxx)
- "First Person Shooter"
- "Debt 'N Eight"
- "Blockbuster"

2018

- "WTF"

2019

- "Bruh?!"
- "Dumb Lit"
- "Smoke"

2020

- "Remember"

2021

- "Lose Your Shit"
