= Virus Syndicate =

British grime collective known for their fusion of dubstep with grime

- Origin: Manchester, Greater Manchester, England
- Genres: Grime, dubstep, horrorcore, rapcore, political hip hop, hardcore hip hop
- Instruments: Vocals, synthesiser, electric guitar
- Years active: 2002-present
- Label: Disciple
- Members: Nika D; JSD
- Past members: Goldfinger; Mark One

Virus Syndicate are a British grime collective from Manchester, centred on JSD and Nika D. They are known for their fusion of dubstep with grime, and have been lauded by The Daily Telegraph as "some of the tautest British MC-ing since the first Dizzee Rascal album."

== Music and style ==
Virus Syndicate is known for their fusion of dubstep and grime, putting dub effects on the vocals and using sub bass, common in dubstep music. On their 2015 album Symptomatic, Virus Syndicate branched out in Horrorcore and Political hip hop, with songs such a "Watch Your Back" and "Psychopath" having a theme centred on insanity and "Watch Your Back" contains graphic murder descriptions and the song "Do Suttin'" contained political lyrics rapped by Goldfinger denouncing police brutality ("Police are on the loose, they're murderin' civilians"), government corruption, and religion ("The real villains are police, religion, and the crooked politicians"). The song also encourages action in the lyrics in the chorus also rapped by Goldfinger "Do somethin', don't just sit back".

== Career ==
They often supplied the vocal accompaniment on Mark One's solo recordings, specifically on his debut LP, One Way. They have also released two of their own grime LPs, Work Related Illness and Sick Pay, both in collaboration with Mark One. The LP cover featured cartoon artwork and a comic strip about the everyday life of the members of group. They also appear on the track "Dead Man Walking" on Milanese's first album. Virus Syndicate appear on the Planet Mu record label. Additionally, they made an EP in 2015 with the Dutch Hip-Hop group Dope D.O.D. called Battle Royal EP. They next released a track called "Next Wave", a collaboration with Swedish DJ and Producer, Bossfight. In 2016, their collaboration with Buku, a track called "Worker Bees" was featured on Ubisoft Annecy's extreme snow-sport game "STEEP". Since their 2017 EP "The Mancunian Way" on Disciple Records, the group have released multiple projects on the label together with big names in the bass music world such as Virtual Riot, Dodge & Fuski, Barely Alive, Infekt and more.
