= Panda Eyes =

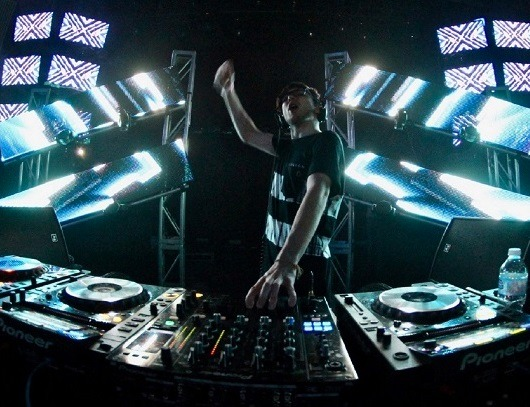
- Panda Eyes performing in Calgary, Canada in 2016

Background information
- Born: Oskar Gabriel Steinbeck; 28 May 1996 (age 30)
- Origin: Zürich, Switzerland
- Genres: Dubstep, glitch hop, drumstep, melodic dubstep, trap, future bass, drum and bass, electro, EDM
- Labels: Monstercat, Disciple, Rampage Recordings, Panda Eyes Records, Magnum Records, Ghosts & Skulls

Oskar Gabriel Steinbeck (born 28 May 1996), known by his stage name Panda Eyes or Lil Panda X, is a Swiss DJ and record producer.

== Career ==
Steinbeck started in 2013 bringing together elements of chiptune, dubstep and other genres of bass music to form his own style of glitch-hop. Recording multiple singles, he gained recognition by releasing them on YouTube and SoundCloud.

In early 2015 he released the song "Superheroes" with German producer Virtual Riot. Later that year, he worked with Brighton-based producer Teminite on their collaboration "Highscore". The song was released in the same year by Panda Eyes and Teminite, and has surpassed 62 million on streams on YouTube alone. His song "Colorblind" has surpassed 55 million views on YouTube. Ultimately he released a selection of his best recordings on iTunes and Spotify without a label in October 2015.

In 2016, Steinbeck gave his first interview to UKF.com naming Nero, Rusko and Knife Party as triggers that switched him to Dubstep and the French-Duo Justice as his main inspiration to go for electronic music. Announcing the release of "Nostalgia 64" he said "...it's the first tune when I've had an idea when I'm out with friends having a beer and I've actually recorded it down on my phone. It's the first tune I've made from a memo. I felt stupid doing it but I thought 'f**k it' and sang it in my phone."

In 2017, he released a remix of the 2012 Seven Lions song "Days To Come" with approval from Skrillex founded Owsla to release the tune for free, saying, "You know when you have these melodies in your head and you know you know it, and you know you once knew what the name of it was but you've forgotten it? Well I had that with this. I woke up from a dream and had it in my head. I was like shit! I know this! What is it? After 10 minutes of intensely interrogating my brain I remembered it was Seven Lions." In April he posted a video on Facebook, announcing that he was working on a new album. Steinbeck was diagnosed with autoimmune disease while producing his album Continue.

On 28 May 2018, Steinbeck officially signed to Disciple Records. "Disciple was definitely my first choice for a label since they seemed to care a lot about values of being a family and supporting each other and having fun while doing that." he said. "I'm very happy about the situation since a lot of the artists on Disciple are people I look up to and I adore them so it's such a pleasure to work with them." To celebrate his arrival, he also released his EP "Isolation." Steinbeck described his EP as the story of his trip to Los Angeles. He wrote the first two songs to be more introspective, which set the overall message for the EP. Steinbeck said "he's here and alive", and that he will never stop pursuing his dreams and inspirations. "The second two tracks are more uplifting melodically and particularly the collaboration with Virtual Riot and Barely Alive felt like the first step in pursuing a new journey and getting out of Isolation in Switzerland."

At the end of December 2018, Steinbeck announced his decision to leave Disciple Records to continue his independent career.

== Discography ==
=== Albums / Long plays ===
- Continue (2017)
- Journey, Pt. 2 (2021)

=== Compilations ===
- Kiko (2015)
- Nostalgia 64 (2016)
- The Lost Levels (2018)
- The Lost Levels, Pt. 2 (2022)

=== Extended plays ===
- Buckle (2013)
- Harmonic War (2015)
- Isolation (2018)
- Let's Fly (w/ Nasko) (2018)
- Society (2019)
- Journey, Pt. 1 (2019)
- Demons, Pt. 1 (2020)
- Episode 1 (as Lil Panda X) (2021)
- Orange Soda (2023)
