= Dodge & Fuski =

British DJ, electronic music producer (former duo), and record label executive

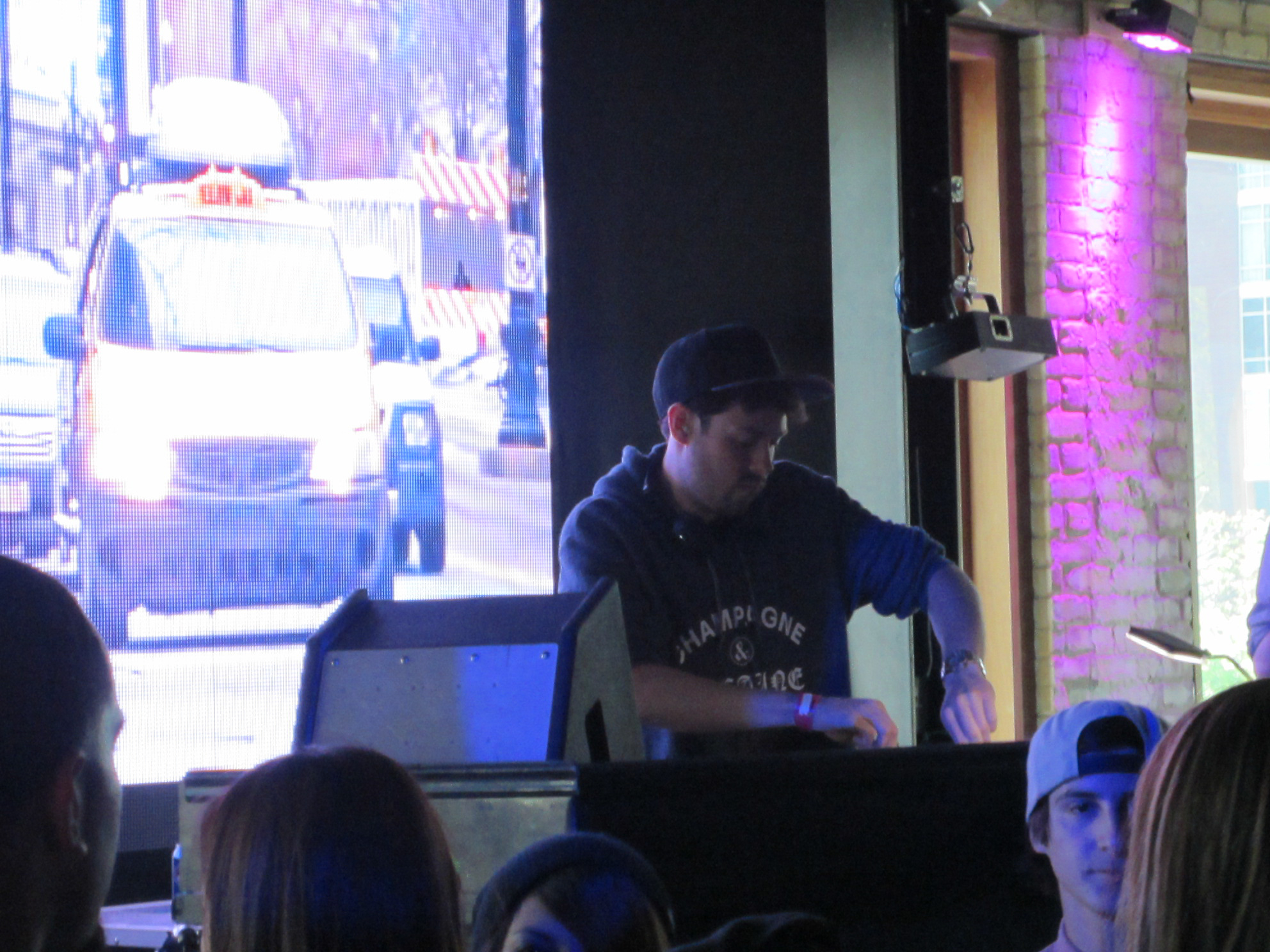
- Rob Talbott in 2016

Background information
- Also known as: Jvst Say Yes
- Born: Arthur Robin Talbott; 9 December 1984 (age 41)
- Origin: Bristol, England, United Kingdom
- Genres: Bass house; Drum and bass; Drumstep; Dubstep; Glitch hop; Moombahcore
- Instruments: Bitwig Studio; Cubase
- Years active: 2010–present
- Labels: Disciple; Eph'd Up; Monstercat; Never Say Die; Section 8
- Formerly of: Mediks
- Members: Rob Talbott (Dodge)
- Past members: Christopher Allen (Fuski)
- Website: dodgeandfuski.com

Arthur Robin "Rob" Talbott (born 9 December 1984), better known by his alias Dodge & Fuski, is an English DJ, electronic music producer, and record label executive. He is one of the co-founders of Disciple Records. Dodge & Fuski was founded as a duo until Christopher Allen's temporary departure in 2012. Allen returned to the group in March 2017 until his second departure afterwards. Talbott is also known as Jvst Say Yes primarily releasing Bass house tracks, and was also a contributor for British music technology magazine Sound on Sound in 2014.

== Early life ==
Talbott funded his university studies by buying home video game consoles such as the Master System, Super Nintendo Entertainment System, and Sega Genesis at car boot sales and then reselling them on EBay worth more than what he bought. Talbott used to run a computer company called "Headstone Computers" while studying at the University of Westminster.

== Career ==
Prior to Dodge & Fuski, Talbott was originally part of a Drum and bass trio called Mediks.

In 2013, Dodge & Fuski released his first, 3-track Extended play (EP) on Never Say Die Records titled "Sucker Punch". The "Sucker Punch" track featured "heavy growling synths and incredible melodies", "Never Let Me Go" featured "a glitched up drumstep" with astonishing vocals and orchestral segments", and "Substance Abuse" featured "unique haunted melodies and massive hitting basslines".

Talbott and Never Say Die parted ways after 2013 to then found and release on Disciple Records. In 2014, Dodge collaborated with Barely Alive to release "Poison". The track was named after a speech during the build up was from MC Mad P from the UK breakbeat group Top Buzz that described someone finding and drinking a bottle of smoke machine fluid at a rave. It reached the #1 spot on Beatport's Dubstep chart.

In 2015, Dodge collaborated with 12th Planet to release "Big Riddim Monsta": A medieval-adventure themed track inspired by the fantasy drama TV series: Game of Thrones which included 12th Planet's Kit Harington impersonation during the buildup.

== Artistry ==
Dodge & Fuski uses Bitwig Studio and Cubase to produce his/their records.

== Personal life ==
Talbott owns numerous video game consoles made by Nintendo, Sega, Xbox, Dreamcast, and the PlayStation.

== Discography ==
This is an incomplete list of the artist's discography. You can help complete this list by adding missing items with reliable sources.

=== Albums ===
Title	Tracklist	Details
The Greatest Album Of All Time	1. Intro (featuring Morgan Freemon); 2. Back With A Vengeance; 3. Mistakes (featuring The Arcturians); 4. Exposure (featuring Laura Lux); 5. Dog Eat Dog (with Ivory); 6. Hungry Hippos (with Dubloadz); 7. Little Blip; 8. Silence Is Golden; 9. Massacre; 10. Take Me Over (with Oolacile); 11. Streets Of Rage; 12. Normalitea (with Infekt); 13. Turnidup (with Protohype)	Released: March 26, 2018; Label: Disciple Records; Format: Digital download

=== EPs ===
Title	Tracklist	Details
Sucker Punch	1. Sucker Punch; 2. Never Let Me Go; 3. Substance Abuse	Released: March 25, 2013; Label: Never Say Die Records; Format: Digital download
Bad Meaning Good	1. Got 2 Come Together; 2. Bad (featuring Messinian); 3. Turn It Up!; 4. Call My Name (featuring 720)	Released: October 22, 2013; Label: Never Say Die Records; Format: Digital download
Stop What You're Doing	1. Stop What You're Doing (feat. JFB); 2. The Clap; 3. Bringing Wobble Back (feat. Splitbreed)	Released: February 10, 2014; Label: Disciple Records; Format: Digital download
Killer Bees / Vibes	1. Killer Bees; 2. Vibes	Released: October 27, 2014; Label: Disciple Records; Format: Digital download
Big Riddim Monsta	1. Big Riddim Monsta (with 12th Planet); 2. Jump	Released: June 15, 2015; Label: Disciple Records; Format: Digital download
The Pretty Good	1. Yeti; 2. Big Riddim Martian (with 12th Planet); 3. OK!; 4. Destination Terror	Released: March 14, 2016; Label: Disciple Records; Format: Digital download
All Killer No Filler	1. Big Riddim Mariachi (with 12th Planet); 2. Comeback; 3. 1-800-RIDDIM; 4. Flat Line (featuring. Virus Syndicate)	Released: March 13, 2017; Label: Disciple Records; Format: Digital download

=== Singles ===
Year	Title	Album	Label
As Dodge & Fuski
2011	Aerophobia	Non-album single	Section 8 Records
2013	F**k Dubstep	Non-album single	Never Say Die Records
2013	Vice (with Culprate)	Non-album single	Disciple Records
2014	Poison (with Barely Alive)	Non-album single	Disciple Records
As Jvst Say Yes
2018	Spin It	Non-album single	Twonk Records
2019	Stupid	Non-album single	Eph'd Up Records

=== Remixes ===
Year	Original Artist	Title	Label
2010	FunkyStepz (featuring Lily McKenzie)	For U	Safe & Sound
2012	SKisM	Rave Review	Never Say Die Records
2013	Pegboard Nerds (featuring Splitbreed)	High Roller	Disciple Records
2014	Getter (featuring Maksim)	Sinner	Firepower Records
2016	The Chainsmokers (featuring Phoebe Ryan)	All We Know	RCA Records

== Selected works ==
- Talbott, Rob (January 2014). "Dubstep Drums". Sound on Sound.
- Talbott, Rob (March 2014). "Mix Rescue: Alex Joyce". Sound on Sound.
- Talbott, Rob (May 2014). "Sounding Off". Sound on Sound.
- Talbott, Rob (June 2014). "On the Bounce". Sound on Sound.
