= FuntCase =

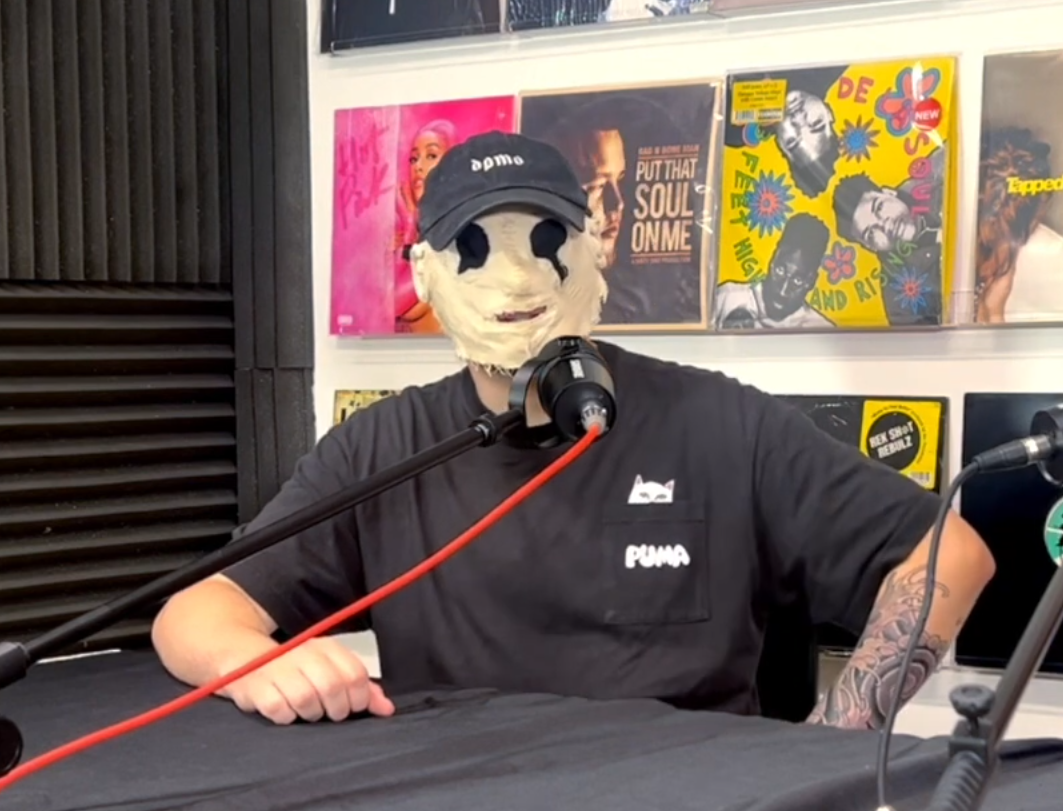
- FuntCase in 2024

Background information
- Also known as: FuntCase; DJ Dose; Haze
- Born: James Hazell; 29 July 1986 (age 40)
- Origin: Bournemouth, United Kingdom
- Genres: Dubstep; drum and bass; grime
- Occupations: Record producer; DJ
- Years active: 2009-present
- Labels: Circus; Disciple; Dubsaw; DPMO; Never Say Die; No Comply Recordings; Prime Audio
- Website: www.circus-records.co.uk/artists/funtcase

James Hazell (born 29 July 1986), better known by his stage name FuntCase, is an English dubstep and drum and bass producer and DJ, from Bournemouth, England. Hazell first released drum and bass, under the alias DJ Dose in 2007, and in 2009 released his first single under the name FuntCase.

In 2010 he was signed to Flux Pavilion and Doctor P's record label Circus Records, while also releasing music under the alias Haze. He is well known for performing wearing his signature mask.

In early 2013 he announced his largest release, the eight-track Don't Piss Me Off EP. It was also announced that he and Cookie Monsta would present the second Circus Records Showcase album "Circus Two".

== Discography ==
=== Releases (as FuntCase) ===
Year	Album/Song	Label
2009	Gorilla Flex / Make Our Day	4:20 Records
2010	Dubsteppa	No Comply Recordings
2010	Brock Out w/ Datsik	EX7 (sister label of Rottun)
2010	Fuuuuk! EP	Dubsaw Records
2010	Prime Audio 003	Prime Audio
2010	So Vexed / Mattress Punch	Circus Records
2010	Ali Love- Smoke & Mirrors (FuntCase Remix)	Back Yard
2010	Marco Del Horno - Ho! Riddim (FuntCase Remix)	Black Butter Records
2010	SKisM - Rise Of The Idiots	Never Say Die Records
2010	Crystal Fighters - Swallow (FuntCase Remix)	Zirkulo/Different
2011	50 Caliber	Circus Records
2011	Wideboys - Shopaholic (feat. Sway & Mclean)	World Wide Phonographics
2011	Crystal Clear - Levels feat. Stapleton (FuntCase Remix)	Cold Blooded Recordings
2011	Sigma - The Jungle (FuntCase Remix)	Life Recordings
2012	Voodew	Circus Records
2012	Camo & Crooked - Hot Pursuit (FuntCase Remix)	Hospital Records
2012	Karin Park - Fryngies (FuntCase Remix)	State Of The Eye
2012	Doomed EP	Circus Records
2012	Ghosts	Circus Records
2012	Plan B - ill Manors (FuntCase Remix)	679 Recordings Ltd
2013	Everybody Knows feat. Foreign Beggars, P-Money & Blacks	Circus Records
2013	Don't Piss Me Off feat. MIK	Circus Records
2013	Stomptown	Circus Records
2013	Angry Claws	Circus Records
2013	Charged Particle feat. Lewis Cutler w/ Engine EarZ Experiment	Circus Records
2013	Fail!	Circus Records
2013	Predator	Circus Records
2013	Titanium feat. Daniil Svetlov	Circus Records
2013	Let's Do It	Circus Records
2013	The Autobots & Dead Audio - Bring Back The Sound (FuntCase Remix)	Passenger
2013	Atom Bomb w/ Cookie Monsta	Circus Records
2013	Genetix - Squid Attack (FuntCase Remix)	Circus Records
2013	Flux Pavilion - Do Or Die feat. Childish Gambino (FuntCase Remix)	Circus Records/Big Beat/Atlantic
2013	Lets Do It w/ Max Headroom	Circus Records
2013	Adrenaline feat. Doctor P W/ Cookie Monsta	Circus Records
2013	Pussyoles (War Dub Skit)	Circus Records
2014	Destroid 3 Crusaders (FuntCase Remix)	Destroid Music
2015	Dirtyphonics - Power Now (FuntCase Remix)	Dim Mak Records
2015	The McMash Clan - Requiem (FuntCase 'Erebus' Remix)	Circus Records
2015	Oh Shit! w/ Eptic	Never Say Die Records
2015	Modestep - Damien feat. FuntCase	Max Records
2016	Predator VIP	Circus Records
2016	Neckbreaker w/ Dirtyphonics	Circus Records
2016	Barely Alive - Elephant (FuntCase Remix)	Disciple
2016	Scary Yikes Grrz	Circus Records
2016	Borg w/ Virtual Riot	Disciple
2017	Dubloadz & FuntCase - Weapon X	Disciple
2017	Dodge & Fuski - Big Riddim Mariachi feat. 12th Planet (FuntCase & Cookie Monsta Remix)	Disciple
2017	4 Barz Of Fury feat. Merky Ace)	Circus Records
2017	Warfare / Bad Selection w/ Trolley Snatcha)	Circus Records
2017	jPhelpz - Hench feat. Merky Ace (jPhelpz & FuntCase VIP)	Rampage Recordings
2017	Excision - The Paradox (FuntCase & Cookie Monsta Remix)	Rottun Recordings
2018	Snails & Dion Timmer - Forever feat. KLP (FuntCase Remix)	SLUGZ Music
2018	You Must Comply w/ Teddy Killerz	UKF
2018	Man Don't Want War feat. Clipson w/ Wooli	Circus Records
2018	Dead Exit - Snake (FuntCase Remix)	Circus Records
2018	Murdock & Doctrine - On A Rampage (FuntCase Remix)	Rampage Recordings
2018	Boom! w/ Teddy Killerz	Get Hype Records
2019	Malfunction w/ Crissy Criss	War on Silence
2019	Get Em w/ Flakzz	Circus Records
2019	Death Stomp w/ Versa	Circus Records
2019	Next Chapter EP	Circus Records
2019	To Death w/ Nitti Gritti	Thrive Music, LLC
2020	Wasteman w/ Ravachol and Vulgatron	Circus Records
2020	Bounce w/ Jkyl & Hyde	Circus Records
2020	FuntCase Presents: DPMO, Vol. 3	Circus Records
2020	Corruption EP	Circus Records

=== Production credits ===
Year	Song	Artist
2012	"Spanner in the Works"	Roska featuring Swindle & FuntCase
2012	"Alive"	Ayah Marar featuring P Money
2013	"Mr. Myagi"	Footsie featuring Discarda
