= Circus Records =

British record label

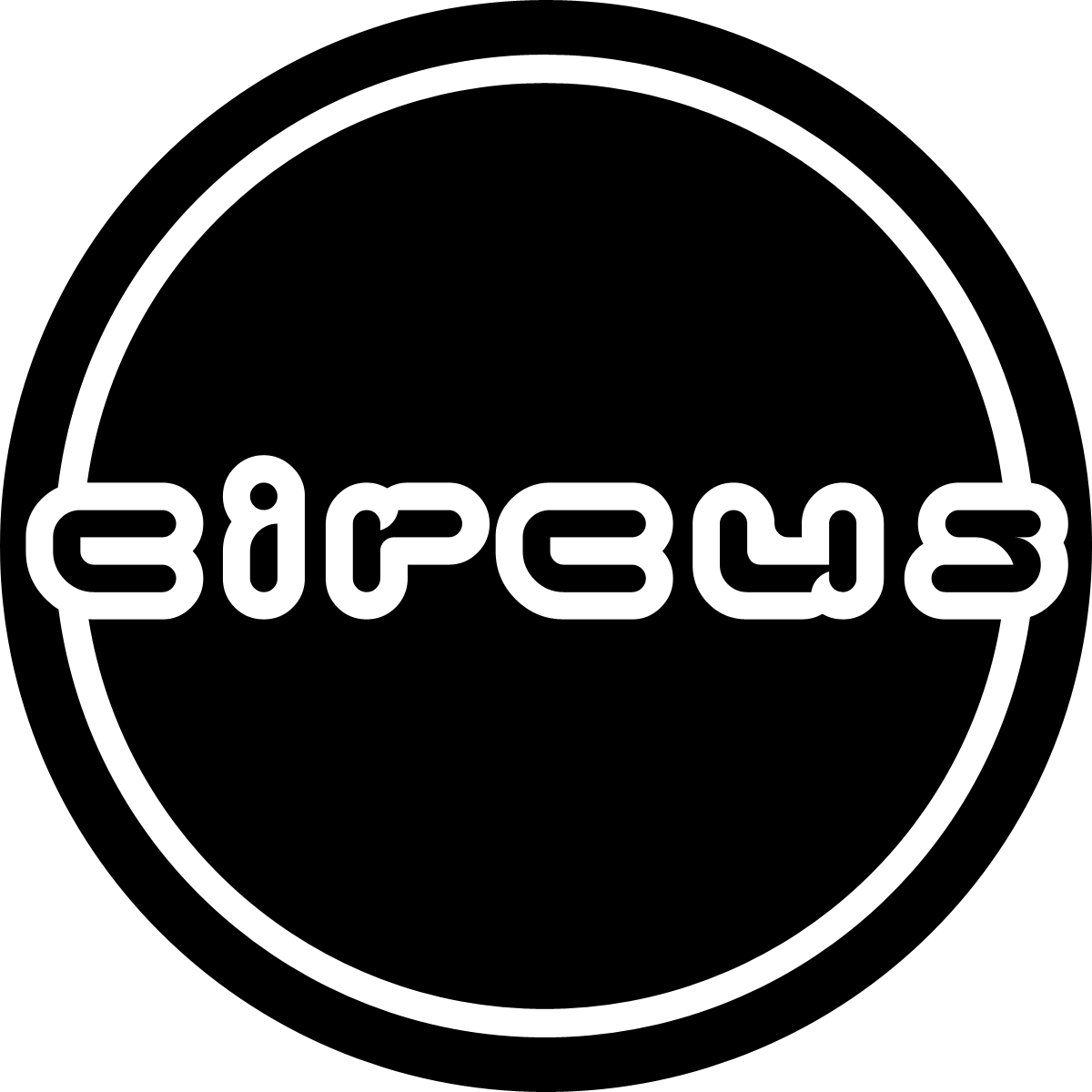
- Founded: 2009
- Founder: Flux Pavilion; Doctor P; Simon Swan; Earl Falconer
- Status: Active
- Genre: Dubstep; drum and bass; electro house; moombahcore
- Country of origin: United Kingdom
- Location: London, England, U.K.
- Official website: www.circus-records.co.uk

Circus Records is an independent record label founded by Joshua "Flux Pavilion" Steele, Shaun "Doctor P" Brockhurst, Simon Swan and Earl Falconer in 2009. Kanye West and Jay-Z sampled the Flux Pavilion song "I Can't Stop" in "Who Gon Stop Me". Steele's extended play Blow the Roof also charted at number 60 on the UK Albums Chart. The label played a role in making the dubstep genre become more appealing to a mainstream audience.

== History ==
Circus Records was founded in 2009 to release "really good dancefloor music that was also appealing to more casual listeners" and to usher the "second wave of dubstep".

In 2022, Circus Records announced a new sublabel called "Circus Electric" as a place for their more experimental, eclectic, "bold, [and] boundary-pushing" releases.

== Artists ==
- Ace Aura
- Carmada
- Chime
- Crizzly
- Conrank
- Cookie Monsta
- Cyran
- Doctor P
- Flux Pavilion
- Franky Nuts
- FuntCase
- Jessica Audiffred
- Kaos
- Koven
- Nghtmre
- Rusko
- Vampa
- Wooli

== See also ==
- List of record labels
