= Disciple Records =

British-American independent dubstep and riddim record label

- Official logo since August 18, 2017
- Parent company: Disciple Entertainment Inc. (Create Music Group)
- Founded: October 25, 2012; 14 years ago
- Founder: SKisM; Nicholas Sadler; Ross Jonathan Burr; Arthur Robin Talbott
- Genre: Bass music; dubstep; moombahcore; riddim; trap; drumstep; drum and bass; house
- Country of origin: United Kingdom
- Location: Los Angeles, California, U.S.
- Official website: disciplerecs.com (Archived April 7, 2024)

Disciple Records, aka Disciple and fka Disciple Recordings, is a British-American independent electronic music record label well known for releasing bass music, dubstep, riddim and trap music records. The record label was home to artists such as 12th Planet, Barely Alive, Dirtyphonics, Dodge & Fuski, Modestep, PhaseOne, and Virtual Riot. Disciple is currently owned by Create Music Group as early as September 2019.

== History ==
=== Early years (2013-2014) ===
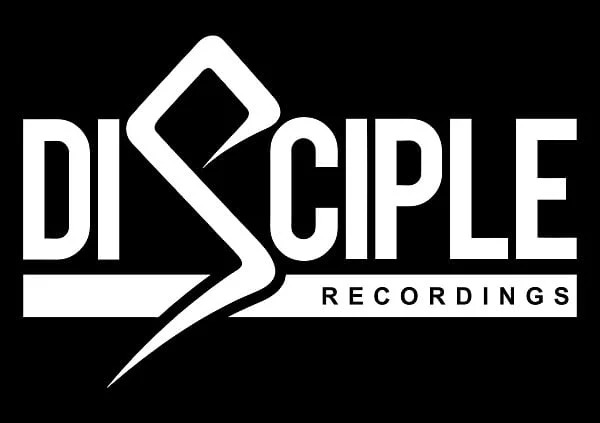
Official logo until 2017

Disciple was founded by Ross Jonathan Burr (aka Myro, and a member of Astronaut: an electro house duo) and Arthur Robin Talbott (aka JVST SVY YES, and a member of Dodge & Fuski: a dubstep duo). Burr and Talbott became friends six months before Dodge & Fuski would be dropped from Never Say Die Records. Burr had prior experience running a record label, so Talbott repeatedly asked him to create one initially as a place for Dodge & Fuski to release music. With financial backing and networking help from Never Say Die's two co-founders: SKisM and Nicholas Sadler (aka Mobscene), the label was incorporated, in London, as a limited company (LTD) on October 25, 2012.

The etymology behind Disciple's logo and brand was "drawn over a pint in the pub one day" that communicated "in a dark and sinister way" where the fan is "part of the clan for life and there's no escape" once one becomes a fan of the label.

Like notable independent record labels such as Monstercat, and unlike other notable labels like the Big 4 record labels, Disciple signs artists on a non-contractual basis which gives the artist more autonomy on releasing their music because the label "wanted a chance to prove that what the artist was committing to was worth their while" and to "create a home for an ever growing family of producers where they feel safe and their music is well looked after. Disciple also offers exclusive signings which meant that artists would have the freedom to create "whatever direction you want to go".

In 2013, the label moved locations twice: First from London to Bristol, and then from Bristol to Los Angeles. The reason for the move to the US was to capitalize on the growth of the dubstep genre in North America, a scene that was simultaneously declining in the UK. In 2014, Disciple was nominated for UKF's Label of The Year Award.

=== Peak years (2015-2020) ===
Despite Burr and Talbott emigrating to the US with "$100... and a seemingly valid US working visa", "crash[ing] on a friend's couch for about six months", and "living off of 7/11 dollar slice pizza just to survive.", the duo have built the label from the ground up. Between 2015 and 2020, the record label was at its peak such as selling out the Hollywood Palladium twice and Belasco Theater (promoted by Insomniac), andcreating a nationwide tour called "Disciple Kingdom".

On March 23, 2016, both SKisM and Sadler relinquished all shares of the label to Burr and Talbott. In December 2016, Disciple was nominated as one of the fifteen record labels, by UKF for "push[ing] hard to find new talents, sounds and ideas and encourage new perspectives and fusions." In 2018, Disciple was nominated as one of eighteen "most exciting imprint[s]" by UKF.

Disciple Round Table Official Logo

In 2017, Disciple launched a sublabel called Disciple Round Table with 12th Planet as the head A&R. The label was founded to as an outlet for underground artists to release music, while the more established, big-brand artists would release on the primary label. 12th Planet used to run his own record label called SMOG Records which used to put out bass music from bass music artists, so Disciple Round Table serves as an extension of him to "champion the artists he believe[s] in". The etymology and branding for the sublabel and its album covers were inspired by the book: King Arthur and His Knights of the Round Table.

In January 2019, Disciple filed Articles of incorporation to the California Secretary of State to become an incorporation. In September 2019, Disciple dissolved its business entity in the UK. According to an April 2024 statement of information, Founder and Chief executive officer of Create Music Group: Jonathan Strauss was listed as the CEO of the label and as one of the two employees on the statement. All this suggests that both Burr and Talbott relinquished all shares and control of the label to Create Music Group as early as September 2019.

In 2020, the record label has hosted "virtual festivals" within popular video game Minecraft due to the COVID-19 pandemic preventing in-person attendance to music festivals. Instead of participants attending and tuning into the DJ's performance in-person, the participant would join the record label's Minecraft server and partake in the identical amount of festivities there. The label advised its artists to use their own music and "only music released by [the record label]" to ensure that the label doesn't encounter any copyright problems.

== Artists ==
- 12th Planet
- Ace Aura
- Akeos
- Antiserum
- Astronaut
- Automhate
- Aweminus
- Bainbridge
- Bandlez
- Barely Alive
- Bare Noize
- Beastboi.
- Berrix
- Bizo
- Bok Nero
- Bunda
- Cactus Flower
- Calcium
- Centron
- Chime
- Christina Grimmie
- Crankdat
- Cyclops
- D3vinity
- Decimate
- Diamond Eyes
- Dino Shadix
- Dirt Monkey
- Dirtyphonics
- DJ Diesel
- DKKay
- Dr. Donk
- Dodge & Fuski
- Dr. Ushüu
- Dubloadz
- Dyatic
- Ecraze
- Eliminate
- Elle Rich
- Faytal
- Figure
- FloodDubs
- Franky Nuts
- Frantik
- Fox Stevenson
- FuntCase
- Ganon
- Graphyt
- Griefer
- Habstrakt
- HelaSex
- Hi I'm Ghost
- Hol!
- Hurtbox
- Hydraulix
- Infekt
- Jeanie
- Jvst Say Yes
- Kompany
- Kozmoz
- Layz
- Leotrix
- London Nebel
- Maahir
- Megalodon
- Modestep
- Muerte
- Mvrda
- Myro
- Nrve
- Nvaderz
- Oliverse
- Oolacile
- Oski
- The Others
- Panda Eyes
- Pegboard Nerds
- PhaseOne
- Rated R
- Ray Volpe
- Runnit
- SampliFire
- Sisto
- Sharks
- Shiverz
- Slander
- Slimez
- Sora
- Stabby
- Strocksu
- Sullivan King
- Telemist
- Twinboys
- Ubur
- Virtual Riot
- Viperactive
- Voltra
- Welon
- Xaebor
- Yookie

== Discography ==
=== Compilation albums and EPs ===
Disciple Records discography
- Compilation albums: 33
- Compilation EPs: 5

The record label released a total of 38 compilation albums and EPs on its primary label and Disciple Round Table l to showcase music by its artists.

==== Disciple Records ====
Title	Details	Recording Type
Disciple 01: Purgatory	Released: May 12, 2014; Format: Digital download	Album
Disciple Alliance Vol. 1	Released: September 17, 2014; Format: Digital download	EP
Reinforcements Vol. 1	Released: March 16, 2015; Format: Digital download	EP
Disciple 02: The Second Coming	Released: May 18, 2015; Format: Digital download	Album
Disciple Alliance Vol. 2	Released: August 24, 2015; Format: Digital download	EP
Reinforcements Vol. 2	Released: October 5, 2015; Format: Digital download	EP
Reinforcements Vol. 3	Released: February 8, 2016; Format: Digital download	Album
Disciple 03: Risen	Released: May 30, 2016; Format: Digital download	Album
Reinforcements Vol. 4	Released: August 1. 2016; Format: Digital download	Album
Disciple Alliance Vol. 3	Released: September 12, 2016; Format: Digital download	EP
Disciple 04: Apocalypse	Released: May 26, 2017; Format: Digital download	Album
Disciple X Jericho	Released: June 21, 2018; Format: Digital download	Album
Disciple Alliance Vol. 4	Released: July 16, 2018; Format: Digital download	Album
Disciple 05: Rapture	Released: September 21, 2018; Format: Digital download	Album
Disciple X Miniladd	Released: December 13, 2018; Format: Digital download	Album
Disciple 06: Mark Of The Beast	Released: March 29, 2019; Format: Digital download	Album
Disciple 07: Seven Deadly Sins	Released: July 5, 2019; Format: Digital download	Album
Disciple Alliance Vol. 5	Released: September 4, 2019; Format: Digital download	Album
Disciple 08: Resurrection	Released: October 13, 2019; Format: Digital download	Album
Disciple 09: Dragonborn	Released: December 25, 2019; Format: Digital download	Album
Disciple 10: Commandments	Released: April 24, 2020; Format: Digital download	Album
Biggest Remix Competition Of All Time (Note: https://music.apple.com/us/album/biggest-remix-competition-of-all-time/1531809736)	Released: October 2, 2020; Format: Digital download	Album
Disciple Alliance Vol. 6	Released: November 6, 2020; Format: Digital download	Album
Afterlife Vol. 1	Released: November 20, 2020; Format: Digital download	Album
Disciple 11: Chaos	Released: December 18, 2020; Format: Digital download	Album
Afterlife Vol. 2	Released: October 22, 2021; Format: Digital download	Album
Disciple Alliance Vol. 7	Released: December 10, 2021; Format: Digital download	Album
The Second Biggest Remix Competition Of All Time	Released: December 17, 2021; Format: Digital download	Album

==== Disciple Round Table ====
Title	Details	Recording Type
Knights Of The Round Table Vol. 1	Released: October 5, 2017; Format: Digital download	Album
Knights Of The Round Table Vol. 2	Released: December 31, 2018; Format: Digital download	Album
Knights Of The Round Table Vol. 3	Released: November 20, 2019; Format: Digital download	Album
Round Table Reinforcements Vol. 1	Released: July 17, 2020; Format: Digital download	Album
Knights Of The Round Table Vol. 4	Released: January 15, 2021; Format: Digital download	Album
Round Table Reinforcements Vol. 2	Released: April 30, 2021; Format: Digital download	Album
Knights Of The Round Table Vol. 5	Released: March 25, 2022; Format: Digital download	Album
Round Table Reinforcements Vol. 3	Released: August 12, 2022; Format: Digital download	Album
Knights Of The Round Table Vol. 6	Released: March 29, 2024; Format: Digital download	Album
Round Table Reinforcements Vol. 4	Released: January 21, 2025; Format: Digital download	Album

== Sample Packs ==
The record label is also known for releasing sample packs from its artists to aspiring artists and producers via Splice (platform).

Year	Title	Artist(s)
2013	Free Sample Pack Vol. 1	Astronaut, Barely Alive, The Brig, Centron, Dodge & Fuski, Habstrakt, Phesta, Splitbreed, and Xilent
2014	Disciple Recordings Xmas 2014 Sample Pack	Astronaut, Barely Alive, Dodge & Fuski, Diamond Eyes, Nick Thayer, and Virtual Riot
2020	Bass Evolution Sample Pack	Modestep
2021	Cyber Trap Vol 1	Eliminate
2021	The Greatest Dubstep Samples Of All Time	Dodge & Fuski
2021	Melodic Riddim Vol. 1	Ace Aura and Chime

== See also ==
- List of record labels
- List of record labels from Bristol
- List of independent UK record labels
- List of electronic music record labels
