= Riddim (genre) =

Genre of electronic dance music

- Stylistic origins: Riddim; dubstep; dub; reggae; dancehall; raggamuffin
- Cultural origins: Early 2010s, United Kingdom
- Typical instruments: Synthesizer; keyboard; drum machine; sequencer; sampler; turntables; personal computer
- Derivative forms: Tearout; brostep

Subgenres
- Future riddim; melodic riddim; riddim garage; sublow riddim

Other topics
- Dembow; bass house; fidget house

Riddim is a subgenre of dubstep known for its heavy use of repetitive and minimalist sub-bass and triplet percussion arrangements. It shares the same name as the Jamaican genre that influenced both it and dubstep, which originally derived from dub, reggae, and dancehall. Originating in the United Kingdom, specifically Croydon, in the early 2010s as a resurgence of the style used by early dubstep works, riddim started to gain mainstream presence in the electronic music scene around 2015.

Despite receiving criticism for its sometimes repetitive drops, it has grown in popularity due to various well-known electronic music DJs playing songs of the subgenre in their live sets as well as various well-known electronic music artists producing the genre.

== History ==
=== Origins and evolution ===
The term "riddim" is the Jamaican Patois pronunciation of the English word "rhythm". The derived genre originally stemmed from dub, reggae, and dancehall. Although the term was widely used by MCs since the early days of dancehall and garage music, it was later adopted by American dubstep producers and fans to describe what was originally referred to as "wonky dubstep". As a subgenre, riddim started to gain mainstream presence in the electronic music scene around 2015.

As all riddim works of music are dubstep, their histories and notable artists can be considered closely intertwined. Riddim can be traced back to several dubstep artists, including Jakes and Rusko. Although not considered a riddim artist, Rusko originally produced dubstep that featured riddim-esque bassline patterns. Jakes is credited by many as being the first riddim artist, and served as direct inspiration for the following wave of producers. From that wave, artists like Subfiltronik are credited for establishing what riddim is known as today.

Various other artists have been credited for having contributed to the rise of the subgenre, including Bukez Finezt, Coffi, Deemed, Blankface, Drippy, The Monsters, Coki from Digital Mystikz, and Kromestar.

=== Growth ===
In January 2018, German DJ and producer Virtual Riot released his riddim-focused extended play German Engineering, which peaked at the No. 11 spot on Billboard's Dance/Electronic Album Sales chart. In February 2019, American multi-platinum artist Marshmello collaborated with riddim producer Svdden Death to release the song "Sell Out". Although the song was criticised for being an "easy cop-out to increase variety" within Marshmello's discography, the song charted on Billboard's Hot Dance/Electronic Songs at the No. 36 position. Svdden Death's later released extended play Voyd: 1.5 debuted at the No. 8 on Billboard's Dance/Electronic Albums.

=== Branching subgenres ===
==== Melodic/future riddim ====
In the latter half of the 2010s, melodic riddim began to gain notoriety via music producers like Chime and Ace Aura. Melodic riddim is a subgenre of riddim that contains more melodic qualities, crystalline or liquid textures, and bright production. It focuses more on the melody, like regular melodic dubstep, but the synths, while having a melody, are usually a little aggressive and detuned. Like other forms of riddim, melodic riddim also has a kick and a clap instead of a single snare. Around the 2020s, the term "colour bass" began to encompass this style of production and expand upon it. Colour bass is described as a "categorisation of bass music coined by Chime that focuses on melody, emotion, and vibrancy", which "sits equidistant between supersaw-punctuated melodic dubstep and more aggressive, impact-focused dubstep – creating a world that takes the best from both sides".

In October 2020, producer Papa Khan released his Blossom EP, which was recognized by Marshmello and promoted on JOYTIME COLLECTIVE. Its opening track, "Rain" is currently the most streamed colour bass track, with 7 million streams on Spotify, 500 thousand plays on SoundCloud, and 480 thousand views on YouTube.

==== Briddim ====
Throughout riddim's history, the genre has commonly crossed over with brostep, creating the subgenre of briddim, which combines the heavier snare and kick sounds of riddim with brostep's sound design. Despite the difference in musical style, briddim is commonly still referred to just as "riddim" plain.

==== Liquid Riddim ====
Liquid Riddim is a subgenre characterized by the fusion of traditional riddim basslines with lush, melodic elements and atmospheric pads or dark atmospheres. Its sound often conveys a wide range of emotions, ranging from melancholy and sadness to moments of joy and beauty and is generally perceived to be less aggressive than standard riddim. In this respect, Liquid Riddim is similar to the relationship between Future Riddim and Riddim. Prominent labels and collectives that represent the genre include Shizuka and THORN COLLECTIVE, both of which have a diverse range of Liquid Riddim releases.

== Characteristics ==
Bommer and Crowell – "Yasuo" (2014)

Infekt – "Orgalorg" (2016)
"Yasuo" by Bommer and Crowell and "Orgalorg" by Infekt are both often cited as quintessential representations of riddim as they both follow the basic characteristics of a riddim song.

Riddim utilises repetitive, minimalistic layers and tuplet percussion arrangements in a rhythmic style. Like dubstep, riddim is often produced at a tempo of 140 to 150 beats per minute and was noted as having comparatively more "space", atmosphere, and "super dark textures" by riddim producer Infekt. Jayce Ullah-Blocks of EDM Identity characterised modern riddim with the presence of low-frequency oscillation (LFO) square waves, wide delays, and a large use of flanger and chorus filters.
