= 2024 Electronic Dance Music Awards =

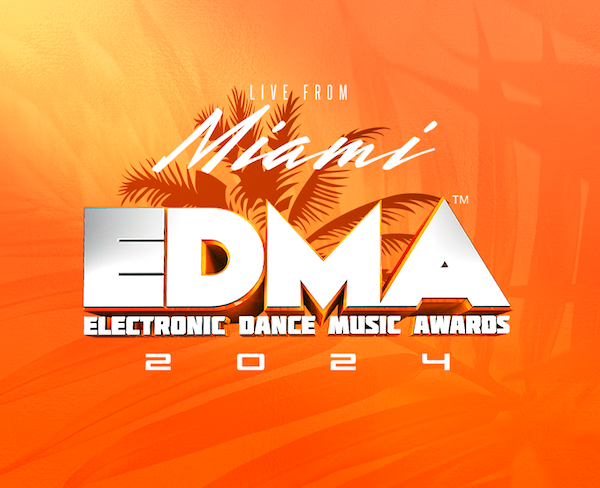
- Awarded for: excellence on the EDM scene
- Sponsored by: TravelClubIQ; Digital Music Pool
- Date: March 22, 2024
- Venue: Eden Roc Miami Beach Hotel
- Country: United States
- Hosted by: Erin Webster

Highlights
- Most awards: David Guetta (4)
- Most nominations: David Guetta (12)
- Icon Award: Mark Knight
- Legend Award: Deadmau5
- Website: edmawards.net

The 2024 Electronic Dance Music Awards ceremony was held on March 22, 2024, at the Eden Roc Hotel at the height of Miami Music Week. A bevy of the nation's top radio stations broadcast the event both on-air and online on the same day. The awards celebrated the very best songs, artists, festivals and more from the global electronic dance music scene, chosen by the public on EDMAs official website. The full list of nominees were announced on February 19, 2024. On March 21, was announced that Mark Knight was honored with the EDMA Icon Award, and on March 31, Deadmau5 was awarded with the EDMA Legend Award.

== Winners and nominees ==
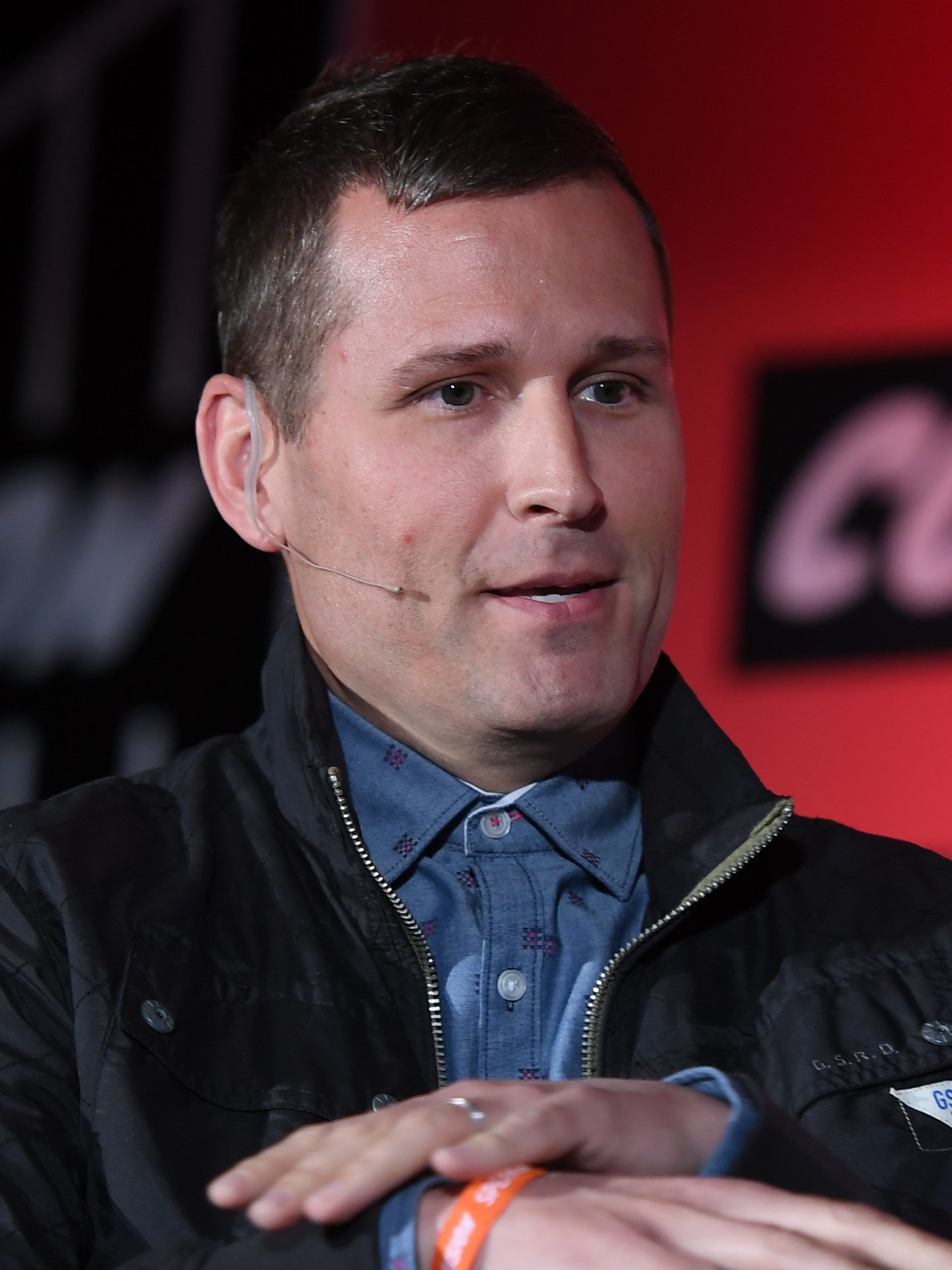
Male Artist Of The Year winner, Kaskade.

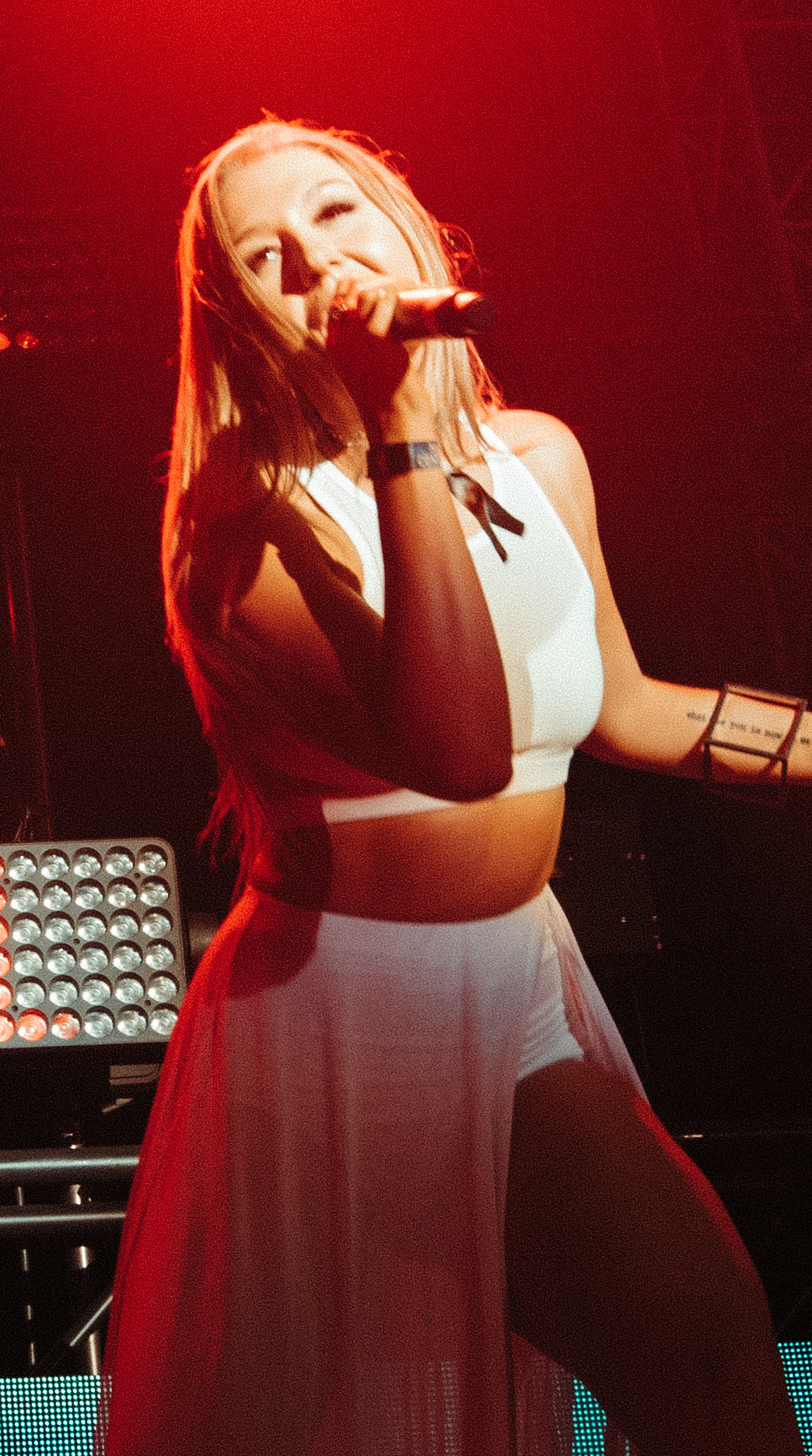
Female Artist Of The Year winner, HALIENE.

Winners appear first and highlighted in bold:

=== General ===
Male Artist Of The Year	Female Artist Of The Year
**Kaskade**; David Guetta; Dom Dolla; John Summit; Calvin Harris; Illenium; Tiësto; Alan Walker	**Haliene**; Anabel Englund; LP Giobbi; Nora En Pure; Peggy Gou; Kaleena Zanders; Hayla; Eliza Rose
Vocalist Of The Year	Album Of The Year
**Hayla**; Zara Larsson; Becky Hill; Nina Nesbitt; MKLA; Camden Cox; Eliza Rose; Ella Henderson; Au/Ra; Vera Blue	**Alan Walker – Walkerworld**; Illenium – Illenium; Skrillex – Quest for Fire; Marshmello – Sugar Papi; DJ Diesel – Gorilla Warfare; Whyte Fang – Genesis; ISOxo – kidsgonemad!; RL Grime – Play; Aluna – Mycelium; Kaskade – Kaskade Christmas Volume 2
Producer Of The Year	Music Video Of The Year
**Vintage Culture**; David Guetta; Tiësto; Dom Dolla; Rezz; Fred again..; Armin van Buuren; Amelie Lens; Fisher	**Eliza Rose & Calvin Harris – Body Moving**; Calvin Harris & Ellie Goulding – Miracle; Kylie Minogue – Padam Padam; Loud Luxury x Two Friends (feat. Bebe Rexha) – If Only I; Fisher, Aatig – Take It Off; Zara Larsson, David Guetta – On My Love; Dillon Francis, Good Times Ahead – LA On Acid; R3hab, Inna, Sash! – Rock My Body
Label Of The Year	Breakthrough Artist of the Year
**Armada Music**; Spinnin' Records; Ultra Records; Monstercat; mau5trap; Defected Records; Thrive Music; Helix Records; Cr2 Records; Toolroom Records	**Hugel**; Kenya Grace; Knock2; Gian Varela; Night Tales; Blond:ish; Luci; The BreakBomb Project; HoneyLuv; Ekonovah
Best Collaboration	Best Group
**Dimitri Vegas & Like Mike & Tiësto & Dido & W&W – Thank You (Not So Bad)**; The Chainsmokers, Illenium & Carlie Hanson – See You Again; Tiësto & R3hab – Run Free; Loud Luxury x Two Friends (feat. Bebe Rexha) – If Only I; Dom Dolla, Nelly Furtado – Eat Your Man; Calvin Harris, Ellie Goulding – Miracle; Nathan Dawe x Joel Corry x Ella Henderson – 0800 Heaven; Seven Lions and Above & Beyond (feat. Opposite The Other) – Over Now; Skrillex, Missy Elliott, & Mr. Oizo – Ratata	**Kx5**; Bonnie x Clyde; Meduza; Nervo; Loud Luxury; Artbat; Keinemusik; Cash Cash
Dubstep Artist Of The Year	Breakthrough Trance Artist of the Year
**Subtronics**; Excision; Jessica Audiffred; Nghtmre; Space Laces; Wooli; Level Up; Mersiv; Zeds Dead	**Tim Clark**; Beico; Metta & Glyde; Annabel; Super8 & Tab
Best Radio Show	Best Instrumental Non-Vocal Release
**Armin van Buuren – A State of Trance**; Nicky Romero – Protocol Radio; Oliver Heldens – Heldeep Radio; StoneBridge - #bpmMix; Vinny Vibe – Good Vibes Radio; Richard Vission – Powertools; The Chainsmokers - #Electro15; Timmy Trumpet – Sinphony Radio; Tiësto – Club Life; Mark Knight – Toolroom Radio	**Alan Walker – Dreamer**; Kx5 – Unobsidian; Markus Schulz x Paul Oakenfold – Pendulum; OneDuo – Changes; Hi-Lo & Space 92 – Arpeggio; Moojo, Da Capo – Secret ID; P.R.O.G.2 – DubVision; Alok & Pickle – Drum Machine
Best Fan Army
**Alan Walker – [Walkers]**; Illenium – [Illenials]; Deadmau5 – [The Horde]; Martin Garrix – [Garrixers]; Excision – [Headbangers]; Marshmello – [Mellogang]; Subtronics – [Cyclops Army]
Icon Award
**Mark Knight**
Legend Award
**Deadmau5**

=== Dance ===
Dance Song Of The Year	Dance Radio Song Of The Year
**John Summit & Hayla – Where You Are**; Fisher x Kita Alexander – Atmosphere; Mau P – Gimme That Bounce; Blond:ish, Eran Hersh & Darmon – Sorry (with Madonna); Peggy Gou – (It Goes Like) Nanana; James Hype – Drums (feat. Kim Petras); Acraze – Take Me Away; Fisher & Aatig – Take It Off	**David Guetta, Anne-Marie, Coi Leray – Baby Don't Hurt Me**; Kylie Minogue – Padam Padam; Loud Luxury x Two Friends (feat. Bebe Rexha) – If Only I; John Summit & Hayla – Where You Are; MK, Dom Dolla – Rhyme Dust; Bonnie X Clyde & FOMO – Need Ya; Kenya Grace – Strangers; Meduza – Phone (feat. Sam Tompkins & Em Beihold)
Dance Radio Artist of the Year	Dance / Electro Pop Song of the Year
**David Guetta**; John Summit; Tiësto; Anabel Englund; Dom Dolla; Armin van Buuren	**Frank Walker & Ella Henderson – I Go Dancing**; David Guetta, Anne-Marie, Coi Leray – Baby Don't Hurt Me; Loud Luxury x Two Friends (feat. Bebe Rexha) – If Only I; Audien & Codeko (feat. JT Roach) – Antidote; Eliza Rose & Calvin Harris – Body Moving; Tiësto – Lay Low; Cheat Codes (feat. A7S) – Location; Regard & Ella Henderson – No Sleep

=== Techno / House ===
Techno Artist of the Year	Techno Song of the Year
**Charlotte de Witte**; Anyma; Eli Brown; Indira Paganotto; Amelie Lens; Reinier Zonneveld; Nina Kraviz	**Hardwell, Maddix & Luciana – ACID**; Anyma & Chris Avantgarde – Eternity; Kevin de Vries & Mau P – Metro; &Me, Black Coffee, Keinemusik – The Rapture Pt. III; Eli Brown – Be The One; Reinier Zonneveld X Hi-Lo – Nirvana (Oliver Heldens); Amelie Lens – Feel It
Tech House Artist Of The Year	Tech House Song Of The Year
**Fisher**; Mau P; Dom Dolla; Chris Lake; Peggy Gou; James Hype; HoneyLuv; Sidepiece; Tita Lau; Cloonee	**Fisher, Aatig – Take It Off**; Mau P – Dress Code; James Hype – Drums (feat. Kim Petras); MK, Dom Dolla – Rhyme Dust; Biscits – Don't Stop; Martin Ikin – Make You Sweat
House Song Of The Year
**Noizu & Westend – Push to Start (feat. No/Me)**; Fisher, Aatig – Take It Off; Peggy Gou – It Goes Like (NaNaNa); John Summit & Hayla – Where You Are; Joel Corry x MK x Rita Ora – Drinkin’; Dom Dolla, Nelly Furtado – Eat Your Man; Goodboys & Benny Benassi – Further Away; Marten Hørger – Love All Night

=== Drum and Bass ===
DnB (Drum and Bass) Artist of the Year	DnB (Drum and Bass) Song of the Year
**Chase & Status**; Hedex; Bou; Sub Focus; Dimension	**Chase & Status, Bou – Baddadan (feat. IRAH, Flowdan, Trigga & Takura)**; Hedex – Mhitr (Semi-Automatic) (feat. Eksman); Kenya Grace – Strangers; Sub Focus – I Found You (feat. Hayla); Koven – Chase the Sun
Breakthrough Artist of the Year (Bass)
**Levity**; Crankdat; Peekaboo; Of The Trees; Jessica Audiffred

=== DJ ===
Club DJ of The Year	Nightlife DJ Of The Year
**Steve Aoki**; Mau P; LP Giobbi; Afrojack; John Summit; Diplo	**Stoon – NYC**; Mednas – Miami; Escobar – Las Vegas; Ochok – Los Angeles; Nathan Scott – Chicago; Deux Twins – Las Vegas; Dantiez – Detroit
Favorite Nightclub Residency (U.S.)	Mixshow DJ Of The Year (Top 40 / Dance) [Presented by Total Smash]
**Steve Aoki – HQ, Atlantic City**; Black Coffee – LIV Nightclub, Miami; Audien – Zouk Nightclub, Resorts World, Las Vegas; Two Friends – FWD Day + Nightclub, Cleveland; Alesso – TAO Beach Dayclub, Las Vegas	**DJ GQ (Y100 Miami)**; DJ Nurotic (103.5 Chicago); Bodega Brad (103.5 WKTU); DJ GHOST (Q102 PHILLY); DJ Triple XL (KIIS FM Los Angeles); DJ Jaime Ferreira (93.3 FLZ); DJ Sticky Boots (HyperMiXx); DJ Jay Mac (Most Requested Live)

=== Festivals ===
Main Stage/Festival Song of the Year	Favorite Festival Series (U.S.)
**Martin Garrix & Sentine (feat. Bonn) – Hurricane**; Calvin Harris, Ellie Goulding – Miracle; Alok, The Chainsmokers & Mae Stephens – Jungle; John Summit, Hayla – Where You Are; Hardwell & Afrojack (feat. Meryll) – Push It; Dimitri Vegas & Like Mike & Tiësto & Dido & W&W – Thank You (Not So Bad)	**Breakaway Festival**; Electric Daisy Carnival; Beyond Wonderland; We Belong Here Festival; Palm Tree Music Festival
Best Performance	Best B2B
**Kshmr – Untold Music Festival, Romania 2023**; Nicky Romero – Nightvision – AFAS Live, Amsterdam 2023; Kx5, Ultra Music Festival, Miami 2023; Martin Garrix – IDEM RAI, Amsterdam 2023; Charlotte de Witte – Ultra Music Festival 2023; Timmy Trumpet – Amnésia, Cap d’Agde France 2023; Gryffin – Ultra Music Festival, Miami 2023; Steve Aoki – Tomorrowland, Belgium 2023	**James Hype B2B MeduzaA – New Year's Eve, Echo Stage**; Madeon B2B San Holo – Vision and Colour Festival, China; Martin Garrix B2B Alesso – Tomorrowland, Belgium 2023; R3hab B2B W&W – Tomorrowland, Belgium 2023; Afroki (Afrojack B2B Steve Aoki), EDC Orlando 2023

=== Mashup / Remix ===
Mashup Of The Year [Presented by Digital Music Pool]	Mashup Artist Of The Year [Presented by Digital Music Pool]
**Fast Car x Drive (Switch Disco Edit) – Black Coffee vs. David Guetta vs. Dakota vs. Jonas Blue vs. Delilah Montagu**; Best of 2023 Megamashup (Djs From Mars) – Various Artist; Rock This Party (Jablonski Shakira Mashup) – Bob Sinclair FT. Big Al; Sweet Dreams x Rolling in the Deep (DJ Arman Aveiru 'Savage' Edit) – Adele vs. Eurythmics x James Hype vs. Tiesto; It Goes Like x Heads Will Roll x Seven Nation Army (Rudeejay & Da Brozz Bootleg) – Peggy Gou x Yeah Yeah Yeahs & A-Trak x The White Stripes	**Anthem Kingz**; Arman Aveiru; BeatBreaker; Danny Diggz; Switch Disco; Deville
Remix Of The Year [Presented by Digital Music Pool]	Remixer Of The Year [Presented by Digital Music Pool]
**Jain – Makeba (Ian Asher Remix)**; Kaskade and deadmau5 – Remember (John Summit Remix); Coi Leray – Players (David Guetta Remix); Calvin Harris, Ellie Goulding – Miracle (Mau P Remix); John Summit Ft. Hayla – Where You Are (Zedd Remix); Fideles Ft. Be No Rain – Night After Night (CamelPhat Remix)	**Sak Noel**; James Hype; David Guetta; Alok; Tiësto; Sam Feldt
Rising Remixer Of The Year [Presented by Digital Music Pool]	Best Down Tempo Turned Up [Presented by Digital Music Pool]
**Cheyenne Giles**; Vavo; Twinsick; Bvrnout; Dan Bravo	**Illenium & Nina Nesbitt – Luv Me A Little (Bonnie X Clyde Remix)**; Coi Leray – Players (David Guetta Remix); Kim Petras & Nicki Minaj – Alone (James Hype Remix); Sage The Gemini ft IamSu! – Gas Pedal (Kyle Watson Extended Remix); Morgan Wallen – Last Night (Vavo & Dlay Remix); Taylor Swift – Cruel Summer (LP Giobbi Remix)
Remix Rewind [Presented by Digital Music Pool]	Rising Mashup Artist of the Year [Presented by Digital Music Pool]
**Aqua – Barbie Girl (Tiësto Remix)**; Beach Boys – Fun, Fun, Fun (Steve Aoki Remix); Alice Deejay – Better Off Alone (Pickle Remix); Stardust – Music Sounds Better With You (WhO Remix); Delerium feat. Sarah McLachlan – Silence (Kryder Remix); Gloria Gaynor – I Will Survive (FÄT TONY Remix)	**Even Steve**; Jean Philippe; DJ Getdown; Rick Wonder; Lee Morrison
Best Use of Sample [Presented by Digital Music Pool]	Remake of the Year [Presented by Digital Music Pool]
**David Guetta, Anne-Marie, Coi Leray – Baby Don't Hurt Me**; James Hype – Drums (feat. Kim Petras); Jengi- Bel Mercy; Pickle – Crank That; ESSEL & James Hurr- Hit Em Up Style (Oops!); Tiësto, Tears For Fears, Niiko X Swae, Gudfella – Rule The World (Everybody)	**Cash Cash, Taylor Dayne – Tell It To My Heart**; Hypathon x David Guetta – Be My Love (Ft. La Bouche); Rita Ora – Praising You (feat. Fatboy Slim); Kevin Ruolf & Bvrnout – Let It Rock; Dimitri Vegas & Like Mike & Tiësto & Dido & W&W – Thank You (Not So Bad); Diplo & Hugel (feat. Julia Church) – Stay High; Kream X Coco Star – I Need A Miracle; R3hab, Inna, Sash! – Rock My Body
Radio Remixer Of The Year [Presented by Digital Music Pool]
**Kue**; Charlie Lane; J Bruus; Dave Audé; Colin Jay; Country Club Martini Crew

== Most wins ==
The following individuals received two or more Electronic Dance Music Awards:

4 wins

- David Guetta

3 wins

- Alan Walker

2 wins

- Anne-Marie
- Coi Leray
- Chase & Status
- FISHER
- Hayla
- Steve Aoki
- Tiësto

== Most nominations ==
The following individuals received two or more Electronic Dance Music Awards nominations:

12 nominations

- David Guetta

8 nominations

- Hayla

6 nominations

- Calvin Harris
- Coi Leray
- Mau P

5 nominations

- ILLENIUM

4 nominations

- Anne-Marie
- Bebe Rexha
- Ellie Goulding
- Ella Henderson
- Eliza Rose
- Kim Petras
- Martin Garrix

3 nominations

- Kenya Grace
- MEDUZA

2 nominations

- Diplo
- Kylie Minogue
- Nina Nesbitt
- Rita Ora
