= 2023 Electronic Dance Music Awards =

- Awarded for: excellence on the EDM scene
- Sponsored by: TravelClubIQ; Digital Music Pool
- Date: March 24, 2023
- Venue: Fontainebleau Miami Beach Hotel
- Country: United States
- Hosted by: Sean “Hollywood” Hamilton

Highlights
- Most awards: Joel Corry (3)
- Most nominations: Joel Corry (11)
- Icon Award: VASSY
- Website: edmawards.net

The 2023 Electronic Dance Music Awards (or EDMAs) celebrated the very best songs, artists, festivals and more from the global electronic dance music scene, chosen by the public on EDMAs official website. The full list of nominees were announced on February 27, 2023, and the ceremony took place at the Fontainebleau Miami Beach coinciding with the first day of Ultra Music Festival, on March 24, 2023. A bevy of the nation's top radio stations broadcast the event both on-air and online on the same day, and iHeartRadio’s Sean “Hollywood” Hamilton hosted the event. VASSY was honored with the EDMA Icon Award, becoming the first woman to receive the award. Joel Corry was the most nominated act, and the big winner of the ceremony, taking three awards out of eleven nominations.

== Winners and nominees ==
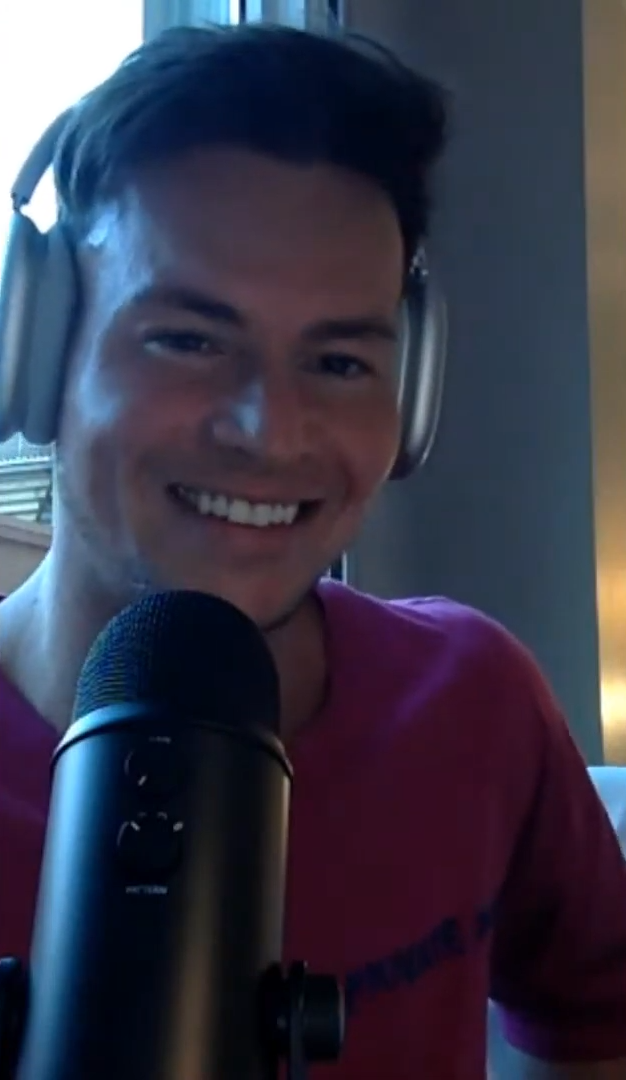
Male Artist Of The Year winner, Joel Corry.

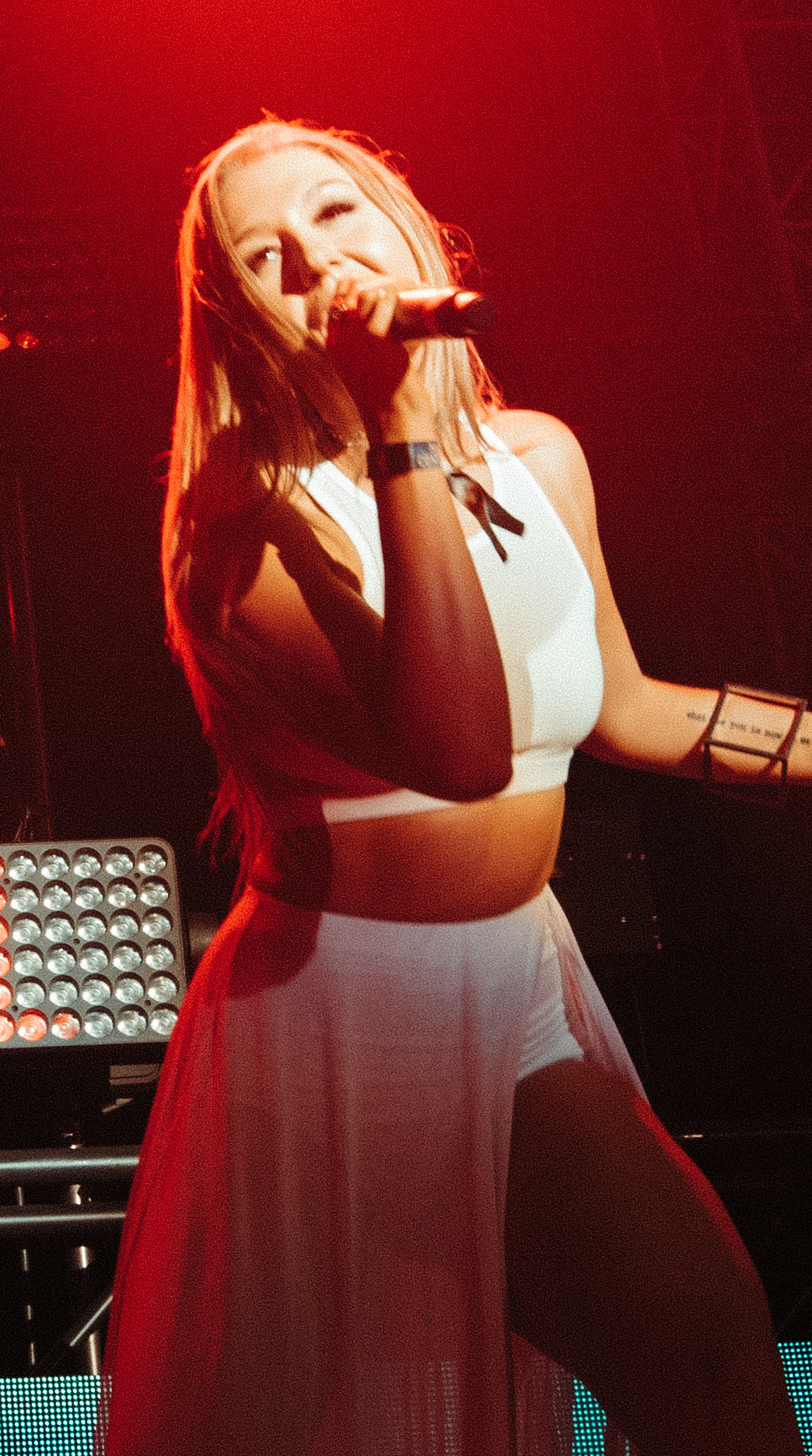
Female Artist of the Year winner, HALIENE.

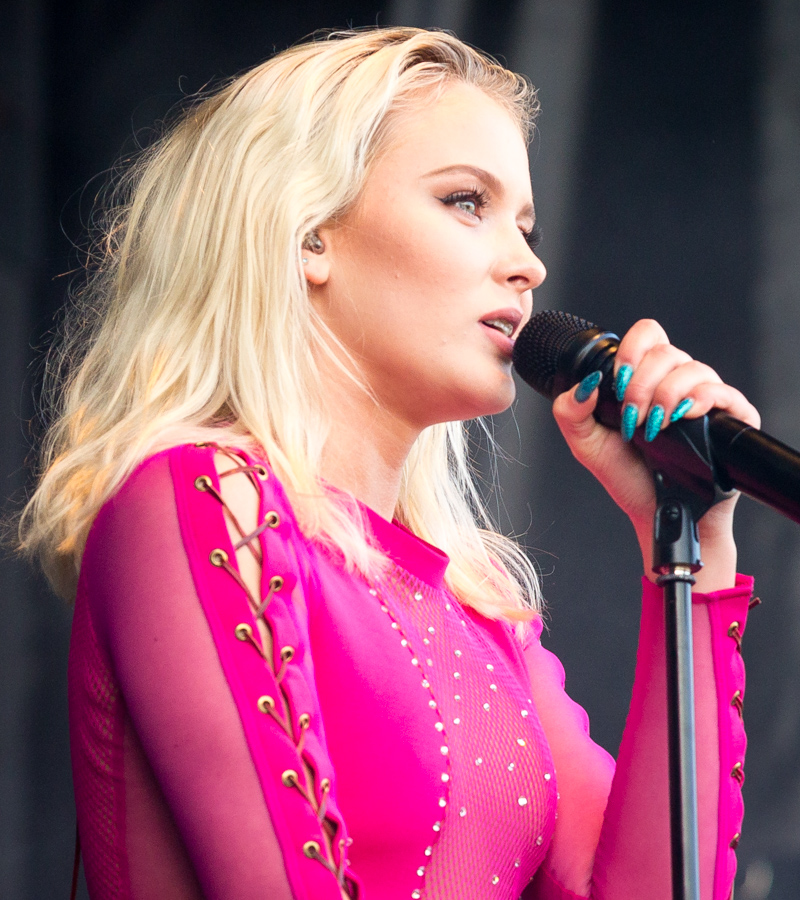
Vocalist of the Year winner, Zara Larsson.

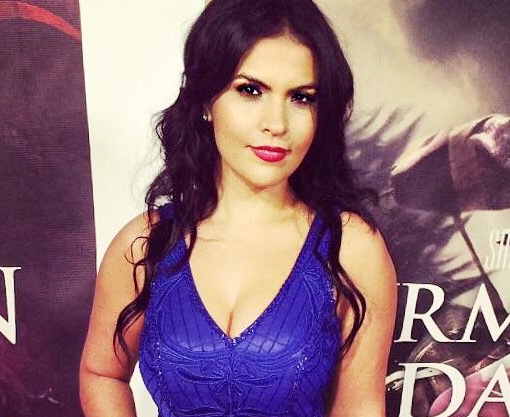
Icon Award winner, VASSY.

Winners appear first and highlighted in bold:

=== General ===
Male Artist Of The Year	Female Artist Of The Year
**Joel Corry**; David Guetta; Diplo; James Hype; Fred Again; Skrillex	**Haliene**; Ellie Goulding; Nora En Pure; LP Giobbi; Anabel Englund; Rezz; Charlotte de Witte
Vocalist Of The Year	Best New Artist
**Zara Larsson**; KIDDO; Bebe Rexha; Becky Hill; RAYE; Maia Wright	**Ray Volpe**; Fred Again; TaleOfUs; Lena Leon; TELYKast; Mau P; Issey Cross; ISOxo
Producer Of The Year	Music Video Of The Year
**ILLENIUM**; Flume; David Guetta; James Hype; Diplo; John Summit; Gryffin; Fred Again; Joel Corry	**Armin van Buuren - "One More Time" (feat. Maia Wright)**; Steve Aoki & Regard - "New York" (feat. Mazie); Oliver Tree & Robin Schultz - "Miss You"; Joel Corry & Tom Grennan - "Lionheart (Fearless)"; David Guetta & Becky Hill & Ella Henderson - "Crazy What Love Can Do"; David Guetta & Bebe Rexha - "I'm Good (Blue)"
Label Of The Year	Dubstep Artist Of The Year
**Spinnin' Records**; Armada Music; Defected Records; Mau5trap; Thrive Music; Mad Decent Records; Big Beat Records; Ultra Records; STMPD Records	**Subtronics**; Ray Volpe; Excision; Skrillex; GRiZ; Kill The Noise; Black Tiger Sex Machine
Best Collaboration	Best Group
**Martin Garrix & Zedd - "Follow" (feat. Emily Warren)**; Dillon Francis & ILLENIUM - "Don't Let Me Let Go" (feat. Evan Giia); MEDUZA & James Carter - "Bad Memories" (feat. Elley Duhe); Steve Aoki & Regard - "New York" (feat. Mazie); Afrojack & Black V Neck - "Day N Night" (feat. Muni Long); Fred Again & Swedish House Mafia - "Turn On The Lights again.." (feat. Future); Malaa & Linkin Park - "In the End" (2022 remix)	**Nervo**; Swedish House Mafia; Sofi Tukker; Loud Luxury; Kx5; The Chainsmokers
Best Fan Army
**Steve Aoki**; Loud Luxury; Two Friends; Dillon Francis; Marshmello; Armin van Buuren; ILLENIUM
Icon Award
**VASSY**

=== Dance ===
Dance Song Of The Year (Non-Radio)	Dance Song Of The Year (Radio)
**Mau P - "Drugs From Amsterdam"**; Kx5 - "Alive" (feat. The Moth & The Flame); Dom Dolla - "Miracle Maker" (feat. Clementine Douglas); Supermode - "Tell Me Why" (MEDUZA remix); Fred Again - "Danielle (smile on my face)"; John Summit - "La Danza"	**David Guetta & Bebe Rexha - "I'm Good (Blue)"**; Armin van Buuren - "One More Time" (feat. Maia Wright); Elton John & Britney Spears - "Hold Me Closer"; Joel Corry & Becky Hill - "HISTORY"; Loud Luxury - "These Nights" (feat. KIDDO); Tiësto - "10:35" (feat. Tate McRae)
Dance Radio Artist of the Year	Dance / Electro Pop Song of the Year
**Regard**; Joel Corry; David Guetta; Tiesto; Armin van Buuren; Anabel Englund	**Loud Luxury - "These Nights" (feat. KIDDO)**; Alok & Ella Eyre & Kenny Dope - "Deep Down" (feat. Never Dull); Vassy & Bingo Players & Disco Fries - "Pieces"; Lena Leon - "Spiral"; Armin van Buuren- "One More Time" (feat. Maia Wright); Alesso - "Words" (feat. Zara Larsson); Sigala & Talia Mar - "Stay The Night"; Forester - "All I Need"

=== House ===
Tech House DJ Of The Year	Bass House Song Of The Year
**Dom Dolla**; Chris Lorenzo; HUGEL; Odd Mob; James Hype; John Summit; Chris Lake; Mau P; Mark Knight	**Marten Hørger & BIJOU - "I Know"**; Cedric Gervais & Joel Corry - "MOLLY"; DJ Snake - "Nightbird"; Skrillex & Bobby Raps - "Leave Me Like This"; The Chainsmokers & Cheyenne Giles - "Make Me Feel"; Tchami & Marten Hørger - "The Calling"
House Song Of The Year
**Mau P - "Drugs From Amsterdam"**; Chris Lorenzo & COBRAH - "MAMI"; CID x Westend - "Let Me Take You"; Chris Lake - "In The Yuma" (feat. Aatig); LF SYSTEM - "Afraid To Feel"; Vintage Culture - "This Feeling"

=== DJ ===
Club DJ of The Year	Underground DJ of The Year
**GORDO**; Steve Aoki; Diplo; James Hype; John Summit; Afrojack; R3hab	**Purple Disco Machine**; Carl Cox; Mark Knight; Black Coffee; Pete Tong; Solomun; Claptone; David Penn
Mixshow DJ Of The Year	Favorite Nightclub Residency
**DJ Nurotic (103.5 Chicago / BPM)**; DJ Zog (Power 965 Miami / Globalization); Bodega Brad (103.5 WKTU / Utopia); Flipside (104.3 JAMS Chicago); N9NE (Q102 Philadelphia); Goofy White Kid (933 FLZ); Jay Mac (Most Requested Live); DJ Skillz (KC101 Connecticut); Dramos (Z100 New York); DJ Triple XL (KIIS FM Los Angeles)	**FWD Day+Nightclub - Cleveland, John Summit**; The Wynn - Las Vegas, Marshmello; Resorts World - Las Vegas, Charly Jordan; The Wynn - Las Vegas, Swedish House Mafia; HQ - Atlantic City, Steve Aoki; The Grand - Boston, Cheat Codes; Hï Ibiza, Black Coffee
Best Performance	Best Performance Arena/Festival
**Nicky Romero - 10 Years of Protocol, Escape Club, Amsterdam**; Martin Garrix - Omnia, Caesars Palace, Las Vegas, NV; Tiësto - Zouk, Resorts World, New Years Las Vegas, NV; Claptone - Masquerade, Pacha Opening, Ibiza, Spain; Afrojack - Marquuee, The Cosmopolitan, Las Vegas, NV; Swedish House Mafia, The Wynn, Las Vegas, NV	**Skrillex & Fred Again & Four Tet - MSG**; Martin Garrix - Tomorrowland, De Schorre, Boom in Belgium; Dimitri Vegas & Like Mike - Creamfields, Daresbury Estate, England; Eric Prydz - EDC, Las Vegas, NV; Above & Beyond - Group Therapy, Bank Of California Stadium, L.A.; Rüfüs Du Sol - Art Of The Wild, The Wynn, Las Vegas, NV; Boris Brejcha - Arènes de Nîmes, France for Cercle; ODESZA - Kia Forum
Best Radio Show
**Armin van Buuren - A State of Trance**; Enhanced Sessions; Above & Beyond - Group Therapy; Markus Schulz - Global DJ Broadcast; The Magician - The Magic Tape; Oliver Heldens - Heldeep Radio; The Chainsmokers - #Electro15; Vinny Vibe - Good Vibes Radio w/ Racquel Goldy, Pitbull's Globalization; Morgan Page - In The Air; The Martin Garrix Show

=== Mashup / Remix ===
Mashup Of The Year	Mashup Artist Of The Year
**Landis & Da Hool & Joel Corry x DMX - "Party Up" (Angelo The Kid "The Parade" edit)**; Lil Nas X vs Achilles - "Keep On Star Walkin" (LODATO remix); Post Malone & Mark Morrison - "Cooped Up/ Return Of Mack" (SicKick remix); Various Artist - Best Of 2022 (DJs from Mars Megamashup); French Montana & Fireboy DML & Ed Sheeran - "Unforgettable x Peru" (Switch Disco remix)	**Switch Disco**; WeDamnz; Beatbreaker; SicKick; Pat C; Two Friends; DJs from Mars; RIVAS
Remix Of The Year	Remixer Of The Year
**Elton John & Britney Spears - "Hold Me Closer" (Joel Corry remix)**; Lizzo - "About Damn Time" (Purple Disco Machine remix); Nicky Youre - "Sunroof" (Loud Luxury remix); Tiësto & Charli XCX - "Hot in It" (Tiësto remix); Kx5 & Hayla - "Escape" (John Summit remix); Sam Smith & Kim Petras - "Unholy" (Disclosure remix); Elton John & Britney Spears - "Hold Me Closer" (Dark Intensity remix)	**Vandal On Da Track**; Joel Corry; John Summit; Kream; Kue
Rising Remixer Of The Year	Best Down Tempo Turned Up
**Richastic**; eSQUIRE; Beatbreaker; Los Padres; Ziggy	**Sam Smith & Kim Petras - "Unholy" (ACRAZE remix)**; Sam Smith & Kim Petras - "Unholy" (Disclosure remix); Bad Bunny - "Titi Me Pregunto" (Vandal On Da Track remix); Meghan Trainor - "Made You Look" (Joel Corry remix); Taylor Swift - "Anti-Hero" (Kungs remix)"
Remix Rewind	Rising Mashup Artist of the Year
**Lil Wayne - "A Milli" (Sidepiece Remix)**; Bob Sinclar - "World Hold On" (Fisher remix); Supermode - "Tell Me Why" (MEDUZA remix); Bee Gees - "Stayin' Alive" (GRAYMATTER remix); Avicii & Sebastian Drums - "My Feelings for You" (Don Diablo remix)	**Arman Aveiru**; Adam B; Sir Gio; Sell Out MC; Kontrol
Best Use of Sample	Best Remake Rewind
**David Guetta & Bebe Rexha - "I'm Good (Blue)"**; James Hype & Miggy Dela Rosa - "Ferrari"; Topic & A7S - "Kernkraft 400 (A Better Day)"; Joel Corry & Jax Jones ft. Charli XCX & Saweetie - OUT OUT; Nathan Dawe & Ella Henderson - "21 Reasons"; ACRAZE ft. Goodboys - "Believe"	**Oliver Heldens - "I Was Made For Lovin’ You" (feat. Nile Rodgers & House Gospel Choir)**; LODATO & Janice Robinson - "Dreamer"; David Guetta vs. Benny Benassi - "Satisfaction"; Alok & Ella Eyre & Kenny Dope - "Deep Down" (feat. Never Dull); Imanbek & BYOR - "Belly Dancer"; Dillon Francis - "Goodies"

== Most wins ==
The following individuals received two or more Electronic Dance Music Awards:

3 wins

- Joel Corry

2 wins

- Bebe Rexha
- David Guetta
- Mau P
- Armin van Buuren

== Most nominations ==
The following individuals received two or more Electronic Dance Music Awards nominations:

11 noms

- Joel Corry

8 noms

- David Guetta

7 noms

- John Summit

6 noms

- Fred again...

5 noms

- James Hype

4 noms

- Bebe Rexha
- Mau P
- Maia Wright
- Martin Garrix
- Tiësto

3 noms

- Becky Hill
- Britney Spears
- Sam Smith
- Kim Petras

2 noms

- Anabel Englund
- ACRAZE
- Charli xcx
- Dom Dolla
- Ella Henderson
- Ella Eyre
- Zara Larsson

,
