= 2022 Electronic Dance Music Awards =

- Awarded for: excellence on the EDM scene
- Date: June 17, 2022
- Country: United States
- Formerly called: Radio Remix Awards

Highlights
- Most wins: Tiësto; Fat Tony; Rivas; (2)
- Most nominations: Diplo; Tiësto; (6)
- Website: edmawardsmiami.com

The 2022 Electronic Dance Music Awards (also known as EDMAs), celebrated the very best songs, artists, festivals and more from the global electronic dance music scene of the year. Previously known as the Radio Remix Awards, the awards re-branded themselves as a completely fan-voted award show with the name Electronic Dance Music Awards covering more EDM genres.

It was the first time since 2019, that the awards were hold following the two-year break due to the COVID-19 pandemic.

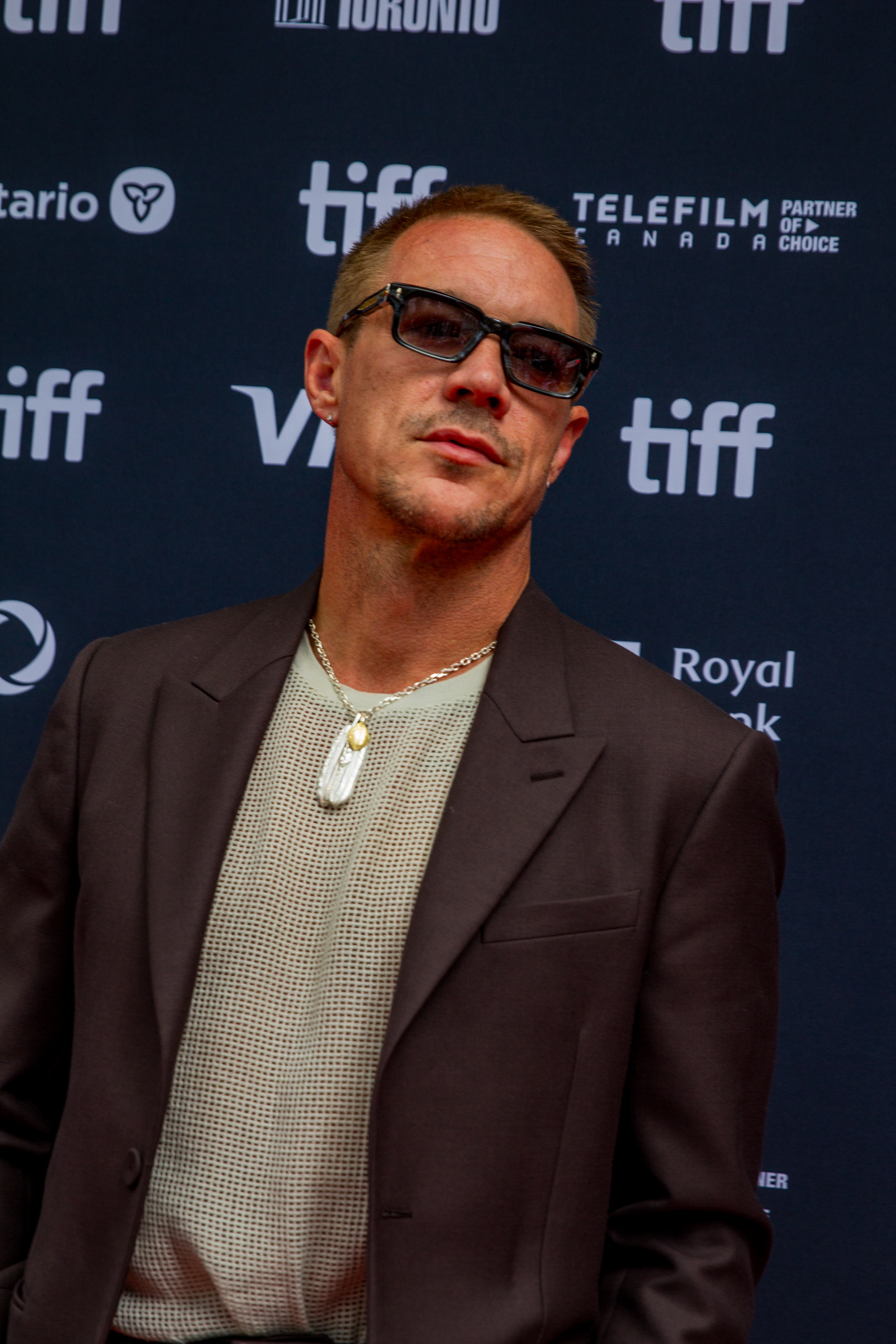
Male Artist of the Year winner, Diplo.

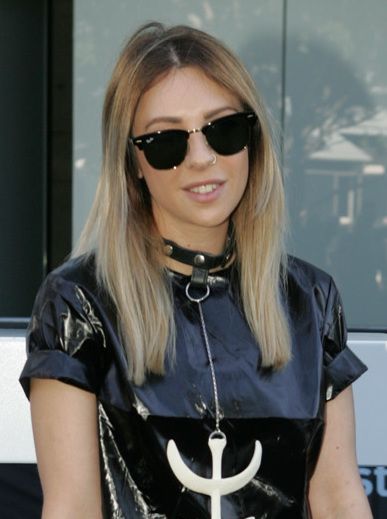
Female Artist of the Year winner, Alison Wonderland.

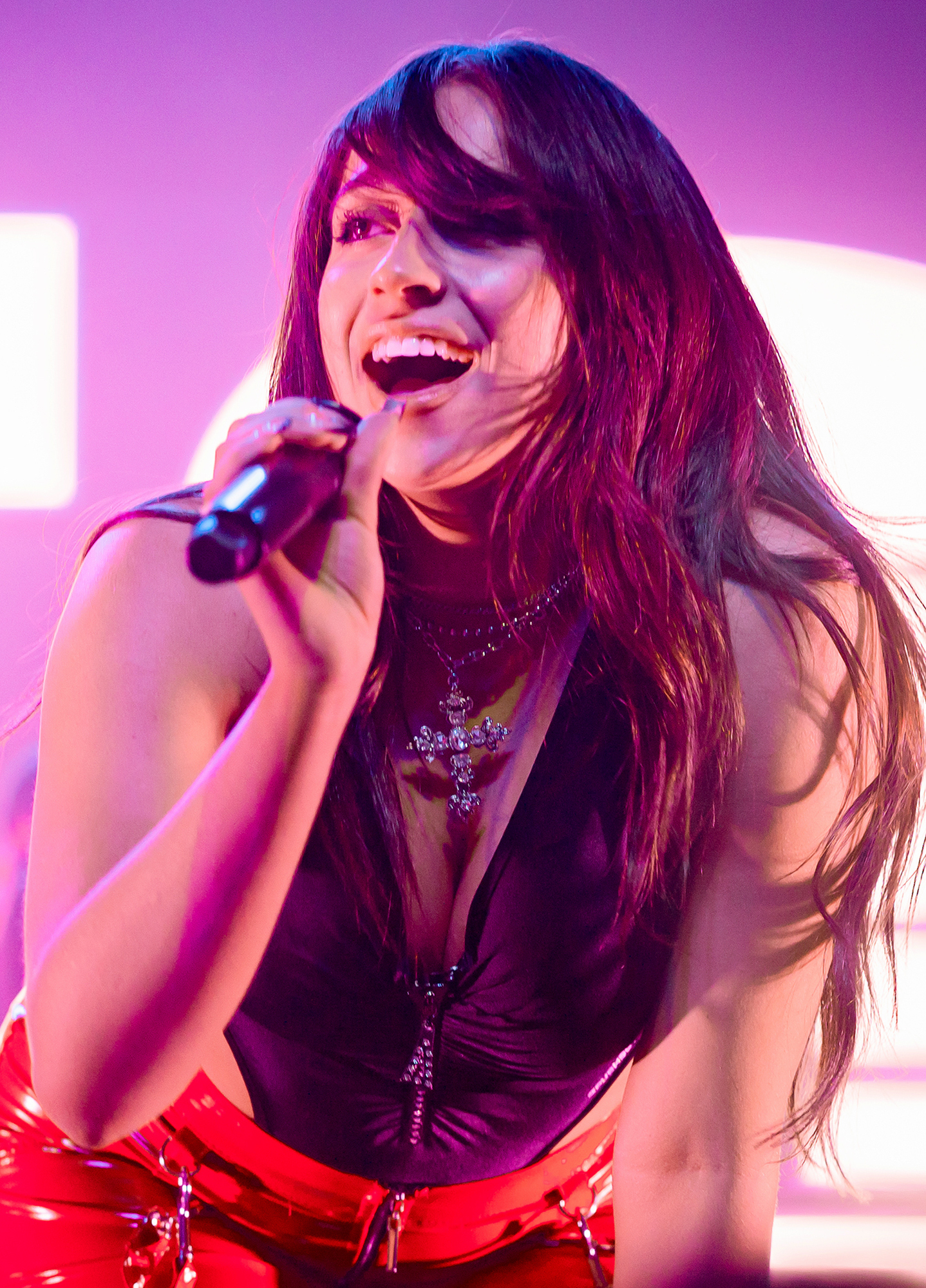
Best Vocalist winner, Tate McRae.

The winners were announced in June 2022. Tiësto, Fat Tony and Rivas were the most awarded acts of the ceremony, with two awards each, meanwhile Tiësto and Diplo were the most nominated with six nods each.

== Winners and nominees ==
Winners appear first and highlighted in bold:

=== General ===
Male Artist of the Year	Female Artist of the Year	Best Vocalist
**Diplo**; John Summit; Vintage Culture; David Guetta; Tiesto; Chris Lake	**Alison Wonderland**; REZZ; Krewella; The Blessed Madonna; BLOND:ISH; LP Giobbi	**Tate McRae**; RAYE; Becky Hill; HALIENE; MNEK; Anabel Englund
Best New Artist	Producer of the Year	Label of the Year
**ACRAZE**; ESCAPE PLAN; Kah-Lo; Fred again..; BYOR; Aviella	**Vintage Culture**; MORTEN; Oliver Heldens; David Guetta; Kryder; CID	**STMPD Records**; Spinnin' Records; Big Beat Records; Ultra Records; Armada Music; Insomniac Records; Thrive Music; Defected Records
Music Video of the Year	Best Collaboration	Best Radio Show
**ILLENIUM, Dabin & Lights – "Hearts on Fire"**; Swedish House Mafia & The Weeknd – "Moth to a Flame"; Tiësto & Karol G – "Don’t Be Shy"; Robin Schulz & Felix Jaehn – "One More Time" (featuring Alida); Steve Aoki & Yves V – "Complicated" (featuring Ryan Caraveo); Purple Disco Machine & Sophie and the Giants – "In The Dark"	**Alesso & Katy Perry – "When I’m Gone"**; Swedish House Mafia & The Weeknd – "Moth to a Flame"; Sam Feldt & Rita Ora – "Follow Me"; Joel Corry, RAYE & David Guetta – "BED"; Martin Garrix & Zedd – "Follow"; R3HAB & Lukas Graham – "Most People"	**Dombresky – Process Radio**; Tiesto – Club Life; Timmy Trumpet – SINPHONY Radio; Martin Garrix – Radio; David Guetta – Playlist; Armin van Buuren – A State of Trance
Industry Achievement
**Pasquale Rotella**

=== Dance ===
Dance Song Of The Year	Dance Radio Song Of The Year
**James Hype & Miggy Dela Rosa – "Ferrari"**; Öwnboss & Sevek – "Move Your Body"; Hardwell – "INTO THE UNKNOWN"; John Summit – "La Danza"; Fisher & Shermanology – "IT’S A KILLA"	**Kx5 – "Escape" (featuring HAYLA)**; ACRAZE – "Do It to It" (featuring Cherish); Tiësto & Ava Max – "The Motto"; Diplo & Miguel – "Don't Forget My Love"; Alan Walker x Imanbek – "Sweet Dreams"; MEDUZA – "Tell It To My Heart" (featuring Hozier)
Dance Radio Artist of the Year	Dance / Electro Pop Song of the Year
**LODATO**; John Summit; Shane Codd; ACRAZE; Regard; KREAM	**Tiësto & Ava Max – "The Motto"**; Diplo & Miguel – "Don't Forget My Love"; Regard, Troye Sivan & Tate McRae – "You"; LODATO – "Neon Lights"; Galantis, David Guetta & Little Mix – "Heartbreak Anthem"; ILLENIUM, Dabin & Lights – "Hearts on Fire"

=== Techno / Bass / House ===
Tech House Song Of The Year	House Song Of The Year
**Fisher & Shermanology – "IT’S A KILLA"**; CID – "Carnaval de Paris"; John Summit – "La Danza"; Vintage Culture & James Hype – "You Give Me A Feeling"; Chris Lorenzo – "California Dreamin" (featuring High Junx); Piero Pirupa – "We Don’t Need"	**John Summit – "Make Me Feel"**; Dom Dolla – "Pump The Brakes"; Diplo & Miguel – "Don't Forget My Love"; KREAM – "Take Control"; Gorgon City & DRAMA – "You’ve Done Enough"; Chris Lorenzo – "California Dreamin" (featuring High Jinx)
Bass House of the Year	UK House Song of the Year
**Öwnboss & Sevek – "Move Your Body"**; Chris Lake & NPC – "A Drug From God"; Imanbek & BYOR – "Belly Dancer"; Dillon Francis & VINNE – "Once Again"; Martin Garrix & Julian Jordan – "Funk"; Nitti Gritti & Marten Hørger – "Want You"	**Jax Jones – "Where Did You Go" (featuring MNEK)**; Diplo & Sonny Fodera – "Turn Back Time"; Sigala – "Melody"; Shane Codd – "Get Out My Head"; Becky Hill & Topic – "My Heart Goes (La Di Da)"

=== DJ ===
Club DJ of The Year	Underground DJ Of The Year
**Steve Aoki**; GORDO; Vinny Vibe; Diplo; James Hype; Cat Dealers	**Purple Disco Machine**; David Penn; Carl Cox; Mark Knight; Black Coffee; Pete Tong; Solomun; Claptone

=== Mashup / Remix ===
Mashup Of The Year	Mashup Artist Of The Year	
**Sean Paul vs Alex Van Diel - "Temperature" (Wedamnz & Rivas remix)**; ACRAZE vs 23 – "Squid Game & Do It To It" (Zedd remix); Farruko & Sebastian Ingrosso & Tommy Trash - "Pepas" (Angelo The Kid Tone Play remix); Shouse vs. Grenno vs. Eurythmics – "Love Tonight" (Grenno Sweet Dreams remix); The Weeknd vs Alesso & OneRepublic – "Save Your Tears" (DJs From Mars remix)	**Rivas**; DJs from Mars; Beatbreaker; Pat C; Rudeejays & Da Brozz; Switch Disco	
Remix Of The Year	Remixer Of The Year	
**Masked Wolf – "Astronaut in the Ocean" (Joe Maz remix)**; Shouse – "Love Tonight" (David Guetta remix); Elton John, Dua Lipa & PNAU – "Cold Heart" (Claptone remix); Ed Sheeran – "Bad Habits" (Meduza remix); Ed Sheeran – "Bad Habits" (Joel Corry remix); Farruko – "Pepas" (Tiesto remix)	**Country Club Martini Crew**; Joe Maz; Charlie Lane; Joel Corry; James Hype	
Best Down Tempo Turned Up	Rising Remixer Of The Year	Remix Rewind
**Adele – "Easy On Me" (Henry Himself remix)**; Megan Thee Stallion – "Body" (Joel Corry remix); Cardi B – "Up" (Zack Martino x Rich Dietz remix); Cardi B & Megan Thee Stallion – "WAP" (Ship Wrek remix); Bad Bunny & Jhay Cortez – "Dakiti" (David Guetta remix)	**Fat Tony**; Sir Gio; Vandal on da track; Gin & Sonic; HÄWK	**ABBA - "Gimme Gimme Gimme" (Fat Tony & Medun Remix)**; David Guetta & Sia - Titanium (David Guetta & MORTEN Remix); Montell Jordan - This Is How We Do It (Mahalo's 90 Baby Remix); Will Smith - Miami (Charlie Lane Remix); DMNDS - Calabria (Vavo Remix)

=== Festivals ===
Main Stage Song of the Year	Best Festival Series
**Hardwell – "INTO THE UNKNOWN"**; Timmy Trumpet & KSHMR & Mildenhaus – "Ininna Tora"; Martin Garrix & Brooks – "Quantum"; DJ Kuba & Neitan x Skytech – "I Want You"; David Guetta, MORTEN & Roland Clark – "Alive Again"	**Tomorrowland Festival**; Creamfields; Ultra Music Festival; Breakaway Music Festival; Electric Zoo; Sunburn Festival
Best Performance	Best Livestream
**Madeon – Coachella 2022**; Swedish House Mafia & The Weeknd – Coachella 2022; Hardwell – Ultra 2022; Afrojack – EDC MEXICO 2022; Eric Prydz – EDC Las Vegas 2021; Armin van Buuren – A State Of Trance 1000 Poland 2022	**Tiësto - Live from Edge New York City**; Nervo - Djakarta Warehouse Project Virtual; Nora En Pure - Arnensee, Switzerland; Two Friends - Live From The Desert (BBM Vol. 20); David Guetta - United at Home, Dubai Edition; Don Diablo - FORΞVΞR, Live in France

== Most wins ==
2 wins

- Tiësto
- Fat Tony
- Rivas

== Most nominations ==
6 noms

- Diplo
- Tiësto

5 noms

- John Summit

4 noms

- James Hype
- Martin Garrix

3 noms

- Hardwell
- Vintage Culture

2 noms

- Alesso
- Ava Max
- Joe Maz
- MNEK
- Purple Disco Machine
- Tate McRae
- Zedd
