= Camden Cox =

- Born: Camden Aimee Kraye Cox; October 1990 (age 35–36); Lincoln, England
- Genres: Drum and bass; house
- Years active: 2009–present
- Labels: RCA Records; D4 D4nce; Sign of the Times; Perfect Havoc; Cake Girl

Camden Aimee Kraye Cox (born October 1990) is an English electronic dance singer-songwriter, producer and DJ. She won an ASCAP London Award for co-writing John Summit and Hayla's "Where You Are" and earned a Grammy Award nomination for contributing to Deadmau5 and Kaskade's album Kx5 (2023).

As a solo artist, Cox signed with RCA Records in 2022. She was nominated for Vocalist of the Year at the 2024 Electronic Dance Music Awards.

== Early life ==
Cox is from Lincoln in the East Midlands. Her mother worked as a drum and bass club promoter locally in Lincoln, while her father was a drum player in Birmingham. Cox completed a BTEC National Diploma in Performing Arts at Stratford-upon-Avon College.

== Career ==
=== 2009–2021 ===
At age 18 in summer 2009, Cox auditioned for The X Factor. Cox wrote and had her first feature on the track "Running My Head" for Shirobon, which was released in 2012. Cox was then invited by RAM Records to contribute to their works as a topline songwriter. During this time, she transitioned her genre focus from drum and bass to house music.

Via Little Boots' label On Repeat Records, Cox's debut EP Kinda Like was released in 2014 along with the title track and "Disguise". She released the singles "Focus" in 2016, "Gold" and "Did You Love Me?" in 2017, followed by "Time" and "Not the One" in 2018. She featured on the tracks "Dreamin'" by Embody, "Good Vibes" by Basada and "Sincere" by House & Garage Orchestra in 2018 and "Destiny" by Kydus in 2019.

Cox released her next single "Somebody Else" in 2019 via the label Perfect Havoc and the singles "Healing" and "Apart" in 2020. "Healing" was MistaJam's Today's Dance Anthem on BBC Radio 1. That autumn, Cox performed "Under the Water", for BBC Music Introducing ahead of the song's release in 2021 via D4 Dance. Her collaborations included "Mind Control" with Joe Stone in 2020 and a vocal feature on "Burning" by Eli & Fur in 2021.

=== 2022–present ===
In 2022, Cox signed a solo record deal with RCA Records. The first tracks released under the label were "Over" and "Elevated". She also featured on "System Overload" by Quarterhead, collaborated with the likes of Kream and Idemi, and had a DJ gig for Capital Weekender.

Cox contributed to Deadmau5 and Kaskade's album Kx5 (2023). This earned Cox her first Grammy Award nomination. Cox performed at the 2023 Boardmasters Festival and Electric Daisy Carnival and supported Ellie Goulding during her comeback concert at Koko. She released the single "Touching Me" and did collaborations with artists including Guz and Biscits. Cox co-wrote John Summit and Hayla's song "Where You Are". For "Where You Are", Cox won an ASCAP London Award in 2024.

Cox was nominated for Vocalist of the Year at the 2024 Electronic Dance Music Awards and appeared on the EDM.com Class of 2024 list. Also in 2024, she performed at Lollapalooza. She released the single "Another" followed by "Ashes" and "Shivers" in 2025. Her collaborations included "Walk on Air" with Patrick Topping, "Fast Forward" with Jason Ross, and then "Destiny" with Layton Giordani.

== Artistry ==
Cox's early work received comparisons to AlunaGeorge, Sky Ferreira, Tove Lo, Banks and Sbtrkt. She has named Robyn and Deadmau5 her main influences. In 2017, she also praised Massive Attack and Alex Clare. In 2023, she mentioned Tove Lo, Camelphat, Fred Again, Bicep, Tinlicker and Róisín Murphy.

== Discography ==
=== EPs ===
- Kinda Like (2014)

=== Singles ===
- "Focus" (2016)
- "Gold" (2017)
- "Did You Love Me?" (2017)
- "Time" (2018)
- "Somebody Else" (2019)
- "Healing" (2020)
- "Apart" (2020)
- "Under the Water" (2021)
- "Over" (2022)
- "Elevated" (2022)
- "Oblivion" (2023)
- "Touching Me" (2023)
- "Another" (2024)
- "Take Me Back" (2024)
- "Ashes" (2025)
- "Shivers" (2025)

==== Collaborations ====
- "Stay the Night" (2019) with Just Kiddin
- "Without You" (2020) with Leftwing : Kody
- "Mind Control" (2020) with Joe Stone
- "Make or Break" (2020) with Future Cut
- "Something About You" (2021) with Sonny Fodera and Yeah Boy
- "Moment" (2022) with Jaded
- "Chemistry" (2022) with Kream and Idemi
- "Pouring Rain" (2023) with Guz
- "Lady Love" (2023) with Oden & Fatso
- "365" (2023) with Biscits
- "Vertigo" (2024) with Agents of Time
- "Walk on Air" (2025) with Patrick Topping
- "Surround Me" (2025) with Punctual and Shift K3y
- "Your Love" (2025) with Guchi
- "Fast Forward" (2025) with Jason Ross, Horyzon and TW3LVE
- "No Matter" (2026) with Leon Lour
- "Destiny" (2026) with Layton Giordani
- "Sun Goes Down" (2026) with Wax Motif and Zhu
- "State of Mind" (2026) with Jamie Jones

==== As featured artist ====
- "Dreamin'" (2015) by Embody
- "Good Vibes" (2018) by Basada
- "Sincere" by House & Garage Orchestra
- "Destiny" (2019) by Kydus
- "Voodoo" (2021) by Spada
- "Do You Remember" (2021) by Dombresky
- "Saving Time" (2021) by Joshwa
- "Burning" (2021) by Eli & Fur
- "Fears in the Fire" (2022) by Miane
- "System Overload" (2022) by Quarterhead
- "Hungover" (2023) by John Summit and Mathame
- "Amnesia" (2023) by Chapter & Verse

=== Select songwriting and production credits ===
Year	Artist	Song(s)	Album
2019	Example	"Click"	—N/a
2019	Headhunterz	"Orange Heart" (featuring Sian Evans	—N/a
2020	Louisa	"Like I Love Me"	—N/a
2021	Nervo	"Gotta Be You" (feat Carla Monroe)	—N/a
2021	WEISS	"Lift Me Up" (feat Sharlene Hector	—N/a
2022	Deadmau5 & Kaskade	"Escape" (feat Hayla)	Kx5
2022	Girls' Generation	"Freedom"	Forever 1
2023	Felix Cartal & Karen Harding	"Need Your Love"	—N/a
2023	Conor Maynard	"Dark Side"	+11 Hours
2023	John Summit	"Where You Are" (with Hayla)	Comfort in Chaos
2024	John Summit	"Go Back" (feat Julia Church)	Comfort in Chaos
2024	Alok & Bebe Rexha	"Deep In Your Love"	—N/a
2024	Hayden James	"Waves Out" (with Ross Collins)	We Could Be Love
2025	Gryffin & Kaskade	"In My Head" (feat Nu-La)	—N/a
2025	Hardwell	"Sanctuary"	—N/a
2025	Anabel Englund	"King Size"	—N/a
2026	Joel Corry	"Stuck in a Loop"	—N/a
