= Tim Clark =

Tim or Timothy Clark may refer to:

- Tim Clark (airline executive) (born 1949), president of the airline Emirates
- Tim Clark (comedian), British comedian, writer and presenter
- Tim Clark (golfer) (born 1975), South African golfer
- Tim Clark (jockey) (born 1986), jockey from Australia
- Tim Clark (soccer) (born 1959), retired American professional soccer player
- Tim Clark (pastor), senior pastor of the Church On The Way
- Tim Clark (artist) (born 1945), Canadian artist
- Tim Clark (physician) (1935–2020), British pulmonary physician
- Tim Clark (rugby union) (born 1979), Australian rugby union player
- Timothy J. Clark (artist) (born 1951), American painter
- T. J. Clark (art historian) (Timothy James Clark, born 1943), British art historian and writer
- Forrester Clark (born 1934), known as Tim, American politician

== See also ==
- Timothy Clarke (disambiguation)
- T. J. Clark (racing driver) (born 1962), NASCAR driver
