= Timothy Clarke (disambiguation) =

Timothy Clarke (died 1672) was an English physician.

Timothy or Tim Clarke may also refer to:

- Timothy Clarke (businessman), British businessman
- Tim Clarke (Australian footballer) (born 1982), former Australian rules footballer
- Tim Clarke (English footballer) (born 1968), English former footballer

== See also ==
- Tim Clark (disambiguation)
