= Richard Walters (singer-songwriter) =

English musician (born 1982)

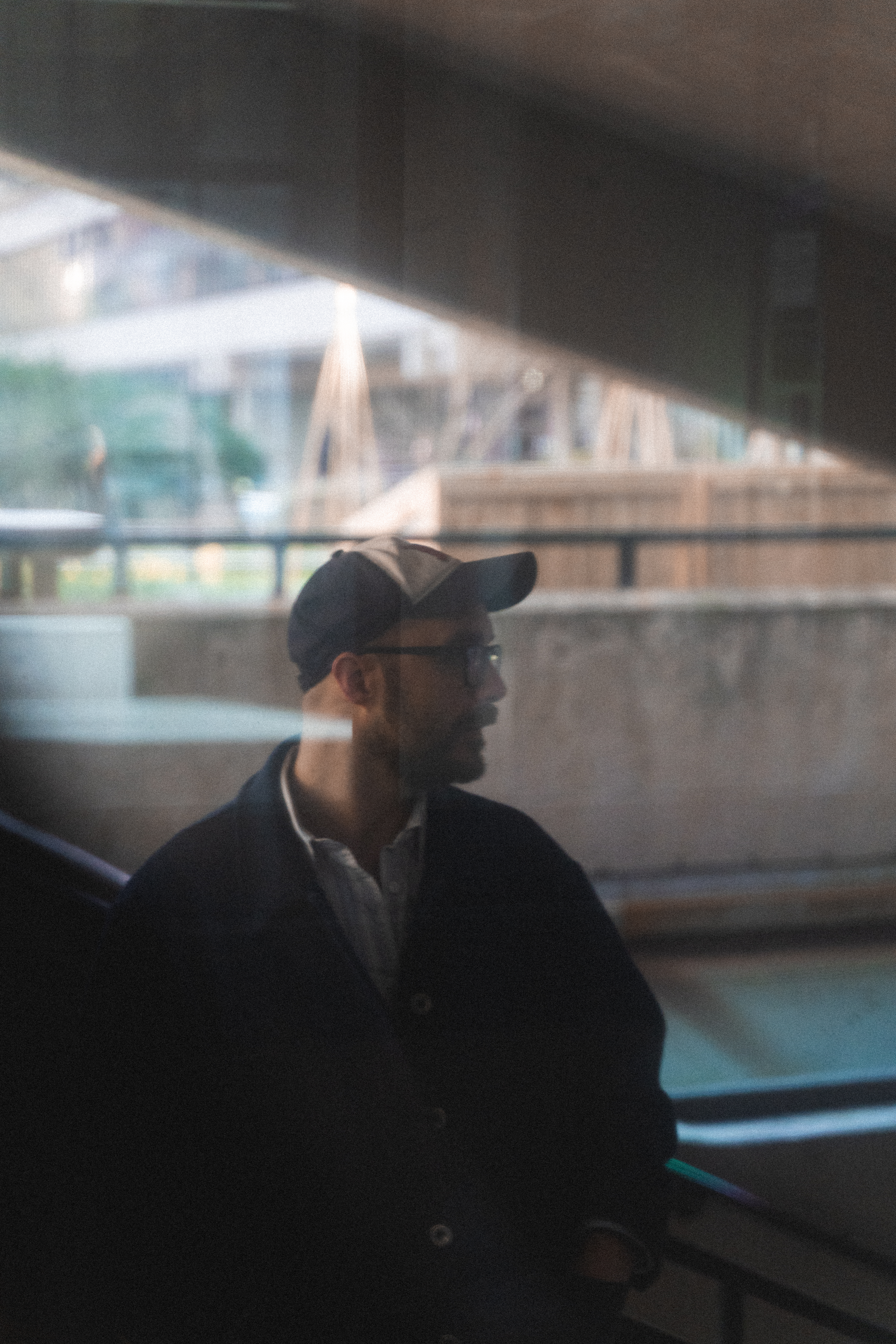
- Walters in 2023

Background information
- Born: 1982 (age 43–44); Oxford, England
- Occupations: Singer-songwriter, multi-instrumentalist
- Labels: Cooking Vinyl, Big Scary Monsters, Kartel, Pilotlights Music, Nettwerk
- Website: Official website

Richard Walters (born 1982) is an English singer, songwriter and multi-instrumentalist. He was born in Oxford. Walters received a Grammy nomination in November 2023 for his vocal performance, songwriting and production work on the Kx5 album, nominated for Best Dance/Electronic Music Album.

== Career ==
Walters was brought up in Oxfordshire and fronted a number of bands in his teens before signing to Warner Chappell Music Publishing as frontman of Theremin in 2001. The band released one double A-side single—"In the Barn/Minor Planets"—through Oxford 'singles club' label Shifty Disco in 2001, before disbanding in late 2002. Walters was then taken on as a solo artist by both Warner Chappell Music and Radiohead's Courtyard Management in 2003, recording the Umbrella Songs EP at the companies' Oxfordshire studios in 2004. The EP gained support on both sides of the Atlantic, catching the ear of KCRW presenter Nic Harcourt, who repeatedly played tracks from the EP on his Morning Becomes Eclectic show. "All at Sea", a short 2-minute piano-led track from the EP, was used in a closing scene of American television show CSI: Miami in 2005.

Walters was diagnosed with epilepsy in 2005 and took a short break from writing and recording around this time. He eventually returned to the studio in 2006 and released the resulting Guy Sigsworth (Frou Frou, Madonna, Björk) produced Pilotlights EP in 2007 on British label Big Scary Monsters.

== Solo Releases ==
=== 2008 - 2011: The Animal and Pacing ===
Walters signed with London record label Kartel in 2008, putting out several singles before releasing the (partly) David Kosten produced album The Animal in 2009. The album was met with critical acclaim and strong radio support in the United Kingdom, with several songs being placed in prominent American television shows including So You Think You Can Dance? and Grey's Anatomy. Chrysalis Music Publishing signed Walters in early 2010. Walters moved to Paris around this time.

In late summer 2010, Walters began writing with songwriter, producer and Britpop guitarist Bernard Butler (notable for co-writing the first two albums by Suede and his work with Duffy) and The Cranberries guitarist Noel Hogan, the result was the 10-track album 'Pacing' released in spring 2011 via Kartel.

=== 2011 - 2013: Young Trees, Regret Less and Two Birds ===
Moving back to the United Kingdom in early 2011, Walters began writing new songs, self-releasing a download-only EP of 'sketches' in December 2011 entitled Young Trees. A full-length album, Regret Less, was released in October 2012. The album received critical praise throughout Europe and a number of songs from the album (and EP) were placed on American TV shows including Revenge, Criminal Minds and Private Practice. Walters toured extensively in support of the album.

In August 2013, Walters released a new four track EP, Two Birds.

In late 2015, Walters recorded a cover of the Peter, Bjorn & John song 'Young Folks', which featured in the Christmas advertising campaign for Polish soft drinks brand Tymbark.

=== 2016 - 2019: A.M. ===
Walters released the 11-track album A.M. on his own label, Pilotlights Music, in October 2016. Produced by Aidan O'Brien, the album includes the song 'July Bones', which featured on an episode of US TV show Bones. The album received notable support from BBC Radio 2 DJ Dermot O'Leary and BBC 6 Music DJ Lauren Laverne. Following the album, Walters released a number of stand-alone digital singles, including 'Nervous Energy', 'This Fire', 'Already Home' & 'I Won't'. These songs featured on TV shows including Station 19, Queen Sugar, Magnum PI and Grey's Anatomy.

=== 2020 - 2022: Golden Veins, Devon or Las Vegas, Pale June ===
Walters signed to UK label Cooking Vinyl in late 2019. His fifth album Golden Veins was announced soon after, with lead single This is Where it Ends receiving a digital release in November 2019. The album was eventually released in June 2020. A track from the album, The Dawn Chorus on Tape, featured on a November 2019 episode of Grey's Anatomy. Produced by Patrick Pearson, the album title was inspired by Japanese art-form Kintsugi. An independently released 4-track EP, 'Devon or Las Vegas', was released in Spring 2021, again produced by Patrick Pearson. The 'Pale June' EP followed in early 2022.

=== 2023 - Present: Murmurate ===
Walters signed to Canadian label Nettwerk Records in early '23 and announced a new album - 'Murmurate' - for a November release. The album was preceded by several singles and music videos, a number of which gained UK radio support from Jo Whiley and Dermot O'Leary at BBC Radio 2. Walters performed a 'Sofa Session' for Jo Whiley on 20 December, which included a solo rendition of 'Silent Night'.

== Collaborations and side projects ==
Walters has collaborated with The Cranberries guitarist and songwriter Noel Hogan a number of times since 2005, first appearing on Hogan's Mono Band album, and later as part of the Arkitekt project.

In 2007, Walters co-wrote and performed the track "Cool is the Night" for the Between Voices album by Anti Atlas, a studio project by Radiohead manager Chris Hufford and classical composer Ned Bigham.

In 2010, Walters co-wrote several songs with Grammy Award-winning singer/songwriter Joe Henry, one of which – "Eyes Out For You" – featured on Henry's 2011 album, Reverie.

Walters collaborated with American house producer Morgan Page in 2011, two tracks "The Actor" and "Light Years", appearing on Page's 2012 In the Air album.

In 2014, Walters launched a new band project called Liu Bei, releasing one single ("Infatuation" b/w "Atlas World") on the British record label Transgressive. An independently released EP, 'Goodness', followed in February 2015, which included a collaboration with Slowdive's Rachel Goswell called 'Fields'. The band released one further single via Famous Friends Records in September 2015 before announcing their split. Walters has continued to use the Liu Bei alias for a number of features and collaborations, including releases with German DJ Solomun.

Walters is a member of the UK band LYR (Land Yacht Regatta), alongside current UK poet laureate Simon Armitage and producer Patrick Pearson. The band released their debut album, Call in the Crash Team, in 2020 via Decca Records imprint Mercury KX. During the COVID-19 UK lockdown in spring 2020, the band released a collaborative single with English actress Florence Pugh entitled "Lockdown", raising funds for the domestic abuse charity Refuge. In 2021, the band released a single called "Winter Solstice" which featured Wendy Smith from Prefab Sprout. The band were commissioned by Durham Brass Festival 2022 to create a new work based on the history of County Durham's 'Category D' villages. The resulting 'Firm As a Rock' EP was released and then performed live at Durham Cathedral with Easington Colliery Brass Band in July 2022. The band released a full-length studio album via Universal imprint EMI North, 'The Ultraviolet Age', in June 2023. In late 2023 the band were commissioned by The National Trust to create new work celebrating the arrival of spring and blossom season. The resulting 'Blossomise' EP was released in 2024, alongside a book of the poems by Simon Armitage. In 2025 the band were commissioned by the BBC Proms to create a new piece to celebrate the centenary of the Shipping Forecast. 'Yonderland', performed by LYR & the Ulster Orchestra, had its world premiere at The Ulster Hall, Belfast, on August 8th 2025 and was broadcast live on BBC Radio 4.

Since 2015, Walters has co-written songs with a number of artists, including 3lau, Semisonic, Alison Moyet, Way Out West, Sultan + Shepard, Apocalyptica, the Deadmau5 and Kaskade project Kx5, Ferry Corsten's FERR project, Vintage Culture, and Nora En Pure.

In November 2022, Walters and Canadian electronic artist Jeff Hartford, better known as Attlas, debuted a collaborative project called Sun Lo. The duo released their first single "Factory Gates" later that month, which was eventually followed by several other singles and a full album titled Shapes in My Head. edm.com said this of the album: "The dazzling album is the byproduct of countless online sessions throughout the pandemic and a strong collaborative spirit, which is evident in spades throughout its 10 indietronica gems. ATTLAS and Walters effortlessly combine their respective styles into a stunning latticework of aching lyricism and chill, languid downtempo music."

In May 2025 Walters was appointed 'Artist in Residence' by the Solent Seascape Project & Blue Marine Foundation, and the 'Songs From the Solent' project was announced. "The idea is that ‘Songs from the Solent’ will raise awareness of the Solent Seascape project and the environmental challenges faced by the region, as well as building an emotional connection between the public and the Solent coastline."

== Discography ==
=== Albums ===
Album Information
The Animal
- Released: October 2009
- Label: Kartel
- Format: CD, Digital
Pacing
- Released: May 2011
- Label: Kartel
- Format: Digital
Regret Less
- Released: October 2012
- Label: Beard Museum Records
- Format: CD, Digital
Lightship EP
- Released: October 2014
- Label: Self-Released
- Format: Digital
A.M.
- Released: October 2016
- Label: Pilotlights Music
- Format: CD, Digital
Golden Veins
- Released: June 2020
- Label: Cooking Vinyl
- Format: CD, Vinyl, Digital
Murmurate
- Released: November 2023
- Label: Nettwerk
- Format: Digital

==== Under side projects ====
Album Information
LYR - Call in the Crash Team
- Released 26 June 2020
- Label: Mercury KX
- Format: CD, Vinyl, Digital
Sun Lo - Shapes in My Head
- Released: 28 April 2023
- Label: Nettwerk
- Format: Digital
LYR - The Ultraviolet Age
- Released: 30 June 2023
- Label: EMI North
- Format: CD, Vinyl, Digital

=== EPs ===
Album information
Umbrella Songs
- Released: May 2004
- Label: Beard Museum Records
- Format: CD, EP
Pilotlights EP
- Released: 2007
- Label: Big Scary Monsters
- Format: CD, Digital download, EP
Young Trees
- Released: December 2011
- Label: Beard Museum Records
- Format: Digital download, EP
Two Birds
- Released: August 2013
- Label: Beard Museum Records
- Format: CD, Digital download, EP
Devon or Las Vegas EP
- Released: April 2021
- Label: Pilotlight Music/Nettwerk
- Format: Digital, EP
Pale June EP
- Released: January 2022
- Label: Pilotlights Music/Nettwerk
- Format: Digital, EP
