= Bonnie X Clyde =

American EDM duo

- Origin: Fairfax, Virginia, U.S.
- Genres: Electronic dance music; pop; trap
- Years active: 2015–present
- Labels: Insomniac; Interscope
- Members: Daniel Litman (Producer); Paige Lopynski (Producer, singer)

Bonnie X Clyde (professionally known as BONNIE X CLYDE) is an American electronic dance music duo formed in 2015 by Daniel Litman and Paige Lopynski. The duo originates from Fairfax, Virginia but started BXC in Miami, Florida, and are now based in Los Angeles. The group fuses electropop, synthpop, house and trap music in their sound. After releasing their song “Rise Above” they followed it up with their song “Bass Jam” which went #1 on Sirius XM. Their name most likely refers to Bonnie and Clyde, an American duo of bandits.

== History ==
Litman and Lopynski were high school friends who attended Robinson Secondary School in Fairfax, Virginia before getting into music. Lopynski was part of Robinson's chorus, while Litman was doing amateur DJing for local clubs and parties in the Washington, D.C. metro area. It was around this time they began collaboration in high school and college. Lopynski attended Virginia Tech while Litman attended Ithaca College for a year before transferring to University of Miami.

Both eventually settled in Miami and restarted collaborations under the pseudonym "Bonnie X Clyde". The duo began receiving shows at local music festivals before receiving their first major show at Life in Color Miami in 2016. There they had their first tour with the support of Skrillex also known as the Gunshine State Tour throughout Florida.

In late 2016, Bonnie X Clyde signed with Interscope Records and released their first EP through them and Insomniac titled Wanted on March 17, 2017.

In 2020, Bonnie X Clyde was slated to play at Bonnaroo Music and Arts Festival, but was ultimately canceled due to the COVID-19 pandemic in Tennessee.

In 2026, "What Love Can Do" became their first number-one song on the Dance/Mix Show Airplay chart.

== Discography ==
=== Studio albums ===
- Tears in Paradise (2022)
- There's No Tomorrow (2024)

=== Extended plays ===
- Wanted (2017)
- While We're Young (2018)

=== Singles ===
- "The Ride" (2015)
- "Why Do I" (2016)
- "Rise Above" (2016)
- "Where It Hurts" (2016)
- "Worth It" (with Clips x Ahoy) (2016)
- "Closer" (2016)
- "Bass Jam" (2017)
- "Torn" (2017)
- "The Unknown" (2018)
- "Do It All Over" (2018)
- "The Good Life" (2019)
- "So High" (2019)
- "Bad Behavior" (2019)
- "Curse" (2019)
- "Leave It All Behind" (2019)
- "Dirty Thoughts" (2020)
- "Atypical" (2020)
- "Love Is Killing Me" (2020)
- "Worst Enemy" (2020)
- "Too Right To Be Wrong" (2022)
- "Need Ya" (2022)
- "No Love" (with Dvbbs and Trevor Daniel) (2024)
- "What Love Can Do" (2025)
