= Timothy Clarke (businessman) =

British businessman

Timothy Clarke is a British businessman. He was chief executive officer (CEO) of Mitchells & Butlers from 2003 to 2009.

He was a partner at Panmure Gordon & Co. from 1979 to 1990. From 1992 to 1995, he was director of Bass European Hotels. He then was CEO of Six Continents from 1995 to 2000, and of Mitchells & Butlers from 2003 to 2009. He was on the board of directors of Debenhams. He is on the board of directors of Associated British Foods, Hall & Woodhouse, Timothy Taylor Brewery and the British Beer & Pub Association.

He is on the board of trustees of the Birmingham Royal Ballet.
