= Chris Lorenzo =

British DJ and music producer

- Born: Christopher Paul Lawrence; 4 July 1988 (age 38); Birmingham, England
- Genres: House, bass house
- Occupations: DJ, producer, remixer
- Instruments: Keyboards, turntables
- Label: Late Checkout
- Member of: Anti Up, Fly with Us

Christopher Lawrence (born 4 July 1988), known professionally as Chris Lorenzo, is a British house music DJ and producer. He is best known for his hit "California Dreamin'" with High Jinx. He is a member of Anti Up with Chris Lake, and a member of Fly with Us with AC Slater.

== Biography ==
=== Early life and education ===
Lawrence was born in Birmingham, England on 4 July 1988.

=== Career ===
Throughout his career, Lorenzo worked with artists like Steve Aoki and Skrillex, who helped his career flourish. Lorenzo is currently working with the labels Night Bass and Insomniac, with whom he has released singles such as "Fly Kicks" and "Nothing Better". In 2018, Lorenzo performed with Chris Lake at the EDC (Electronic Daisy Carnival) in Las Vegas.

== Discography ==
=== Albums ===
- 2016: Destroy the Image
- 2019: Late Checkout

=== Singles ===
- 2013: "Oochie Bang" (feat. Hannah Wants)
- 2013: "What I Want" (feat. Hannah Wants)
- 2014: "Girls" (feat. Hannah Wants)
- 2014: "Rhymes" (with Hannah Wants)
- 2015: "Fly Kicks" (feat. AC Slater)
- 2016: "My Own"
- 2016: "I Wanna Be" (feat. Katy B)
- 2016: "Together"
- 2017: "Nothing Better" (feat. Chris Lake)
- 2017: "Gammy Elbow" (feat. DJ Zinc)
- 2019: "Concentrate" (feat. Anti Up & Chris Lake)
- 2019: "Every Morning"
- 2019: "Take Me as I Am" (with Streets)
- 2020: "Prove 2 U" (feat. Alex Parkin)
- 2020: "Introspective"
- 2021: "Full of Love"
- 2021: "Sensational"
- 2021: "Fly with Us" (with AC Slater)
- 2021: "California Dreamin'" (with High Jinx)
- 2022: "MAMI" (with COBRAH)
- 2023: "Pump"
- 2023: "Shrine Banger" (with AC Slater)
- 2023: "Fly with Us" (with AC Slater)
- 2023: "Seismic" (with AC Slater)
- 2023: "Bongos" (with Crazy Cousinz & Calista Kazuko)
- 2024: "Ghosts" (with Eats Everything, Lily McKenzie)
- 2024: "Bota Bota" (with MC Buzzz)

=== Remixes ===
- 2014: "Delirious" (Steve Aoki and Tujamo)
