= John Summit =

American DJ and record producer (born 1994)

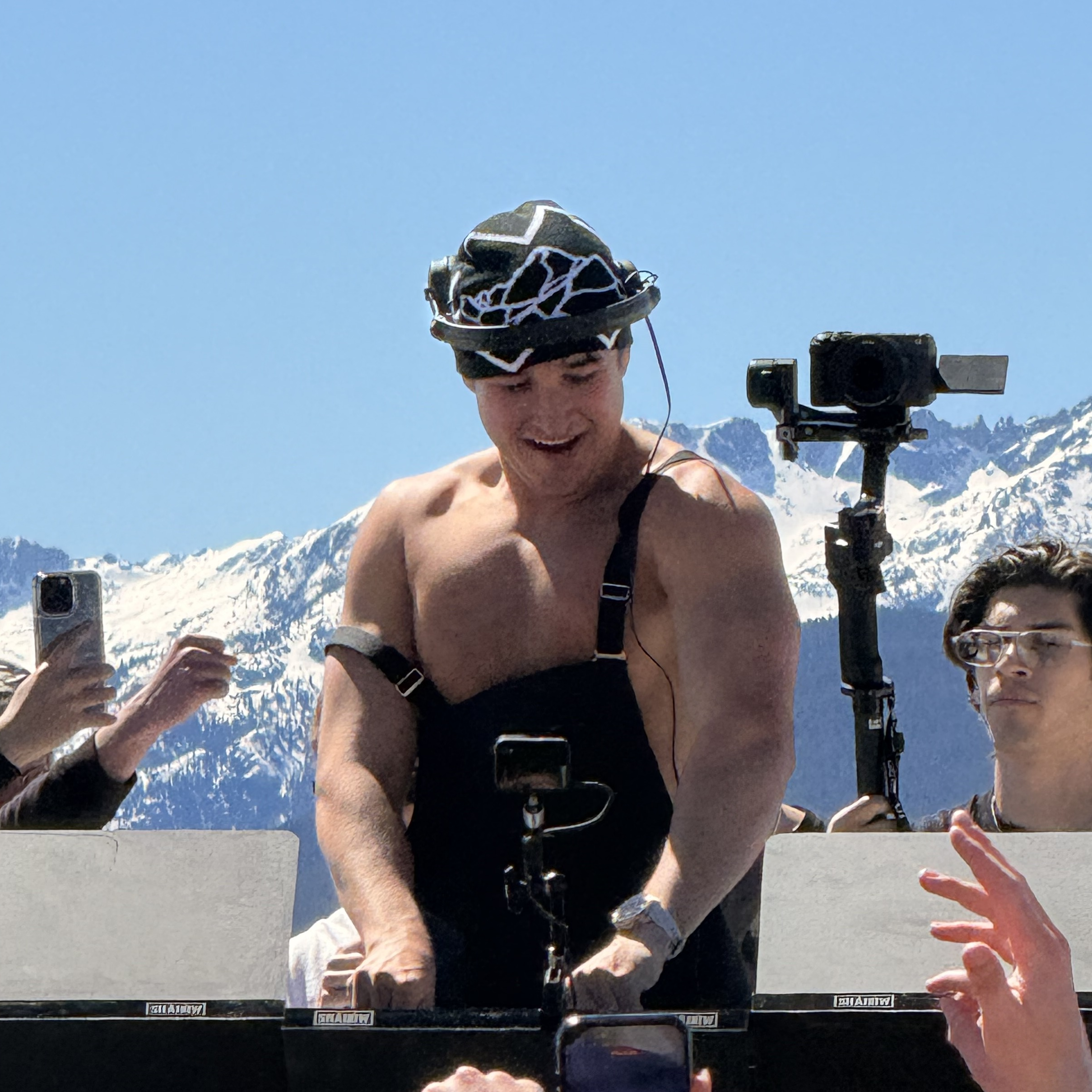
- John Summit in 2026

Background information
- Born: John Walter Schuster; July 29, 1994 (age 32); Naperville, Illinois, U.S.
- Genres: EDM; house; techno; tech house
- Occupations: Record producer; DJ
- Years active: 2017–present
- Labels: Experts Only; Defected
- Website: johnsummitmusic.com

John Walter Schuster (born July 29, 1994), better known by his stage name John Summit, is an American DJ and record producer, former accountant and current owner of the Experts Only label. His music includes original tracks and remixes, primarily focused in the genre of tech house.

Summit has been producing music since at least 2017, but rose to popularity in 2020 with his single Deep End. He released his debut studio album, Comfort in Chaos, in 2024, with his second, Ctrl Escape, released in April 2026. He has received nominations for the Billboard, American, and iHeartRadio Music Awards, and his own label, Experts Only, was SiriusXM's Powertools Awards Label of the Year for 2025.

Since 2021, Summit has toured extensively and performed at major music festivals including the Ultra Music Festival, Coachella, Lollapalooza, Tomorrowland, and Electric Daisy Carnival, among others. His arena touring has spanned The O2 Arena and Madison Square Garden, with an increased presence in smaller venues and pop-up showings. In 2024, both Variety and Rolling Stone noted Summit as an emergent influence in global electronic dance music.

== Early life and education ==
Summit was born on July 29th, 1994, in Naperville, Illinois, outside of Chicago. He graduated from Neuqua Valley High School and later attended the University of Illinois Urbana-Champaign.

== Career ==
=== 2017–2021: Early career and breakout ===
While studying accounting at the University of Illinois Urbana-Champaign, Summit was a member of the Delta Tau Delta fraternity and DJed at local venues like The Red Lion in Champaign and Canopy Club in Urbana. In 2019, he quit his position as an accountant at Ernst & Young and chose to pursue music production full-time, utilizing his personal savings. In 2020, Summit released 'Deep End' on Defected Records; the track became the longest-running Beatport No. 1 track that year.

More career growth followed in 2021 with the release of singles "Sun Came Up", a collaboration with Sofi Tukker, and "Human" (featuring Echoes), which became a No. 1 U.S. dance track. By the end of 2021, he had over 4 million listeners on Spotify, increasing to 7.8 million by September 2023. To close out 2021, Dancing Astronaut named him its Breakout Artist of the Year and he became Beatport's top-selling artist in all genres in 2021.

=== 2022–2025: Experts Only ===
In 2022 Summit toured Europe, Australia, and the United States. While on tour, he started his own label and events brand, Off the Grid, which was rebranded in 2023 to Experts Only. The name "Experts Only" reflects his love of mountains and skiing, as does his stage name (originally just "Summit"). Since its launch, the label has released music by John Summit himself and various other artists. In 2022 Summit was named 1001tracklist's #4 Producer of the Year.

In early 2023, Summit released "Where You Are" (featuring Hayla) with Experts Only in partnership with Darkroom Records. The release, which Rolling Stone called "a festival mainstay", led him to his first Billboard Top 10 in March 2023, and in June, the record hit #1 on the Mediabase U.S. Dance Radio chart.

Shortly after the inception of “Where You Are”, BBC Radio 1 aired Summit’s first BBC Radio 1 Essential Mix in February 2023. In September, Summit and fellow DJ Dom Dolla debuted a collaborative event brand called Everything Always at the Gas Works Park in Seattle, Washington. Summit's major live appearances in 2023 included Red Rocks Park and Amphitheater, The Brooklyn Mirage, and Petco Park, as well as festivals such as EDC Las Vegas, HARD Summer, Lollapalooza Brazil, Creamfields North, Hangout, and ARC Music Festival Chicago. In November 2023 Summit was named to the Forbes 30 Under 30 Music list. At the end of the year, Barack Obama named Summit's song with Hayla, "Where You Are", as one of his favorite songs of the year.

On February 14, 2024, Summit released his single "Shiver" (featuring Hayla) with Experts Only in partnership with Darkroom Records. The song led to his second top 10 on the Billboard Hot Electronic / Dance Songs chart and was described by Jon Caramanica as, "very rarely does something come along that feels like it has a pulsing heart." In April, he performed sets at Coachella, including with Dom Dolla as part of Everything Always and a solo set that saw Summit closing out the Sahara stage. On May 16, 2024, Summit teamed up with Sub Focus and Julia Church for the release of their collaboration "Go Back", which Nylon described as “an undulating house and drum and bass smasher that’ll undeniably be another hit.”

In May 2024, Summit announced his debut album Comfort in Chaos, which was released on July 12, 2024 featuring "Where You Are", "Shiver", and "Go Back". It debuted at number 2 on the U.S. Billboard Top Dance/Electronic Albums chart and number 39 on the U.S. Billboard 200 and received recognition across the world, with Forbes describing it as “a masterclass in unbound creativity.” It was nominated for Top Dance / Electronic Album at the 2024 Billboard Music Awards.

On July 7, 2025, Summit announced the inaugural Experts Only Festival NYC, scheduled for September 20-21 on Randall’s Island in partnership with Relentless Beats, EMW, and Medium Rare. He explained to The Hollywood Reporter that “New York is not only one of my favorite markets, it’s one of the biggest in the world, and there’s literally no electronic festival. There’s a glaring gap in the market, it’s a no-brainer for us to do New York.” Summit was scheduled to headline both nights, with performances by Green Velvet, Kaskade, Layton Giordani, Cassian, LP Giobbi, Kasablanca, Roddy Lima, and Ayybo among others.

Despite the mainstage sustaining fire damage before the event, Summit went on to headline the mainstage at Tomorrowland's 2025 Orbyz edition in July 2025.

Summit received an American Music Awards nomination as Favorite Dance/Electronic Artist for 2025, and his Experts Only label was named the 2025 SiriusXM Powertools Label of the Year. In 2026, he was nominated for an iHeartRadio Music Award as Dance Artist of the Year.

=== 2026-present: Ctrl Escape ===
Released on April 15, 2026, Ctrl Escape is the second studio album by John Summit. The album was conceived around Summit's transition from his former career as an accountant to becoming one of the leading names in contemporary electronic music, with the title referencing the computer shortcut "Ctrl + Escape" as a metaphor for breaking away from corporate life. Musically, the record explores a broader range of electronic styles beyond Summit's established tech house sound, incorporating melodic house, drum and bass, progressive house, and festival-oriented EDM influences. The album features tracks such as "Lights Go Out", "Shadows", "Don't Believe It", and collaborations with artists including Feid, Julia Wolf, Lavinia, and the Chainsmokers. Critics noted the autobiographical themes and stylistic experimentation throughout the project.

The album received mixed-to-positive reviews from specialized media. EDM Identity praised the project's stylistic diversity and described it as a reflection of Summit's artistic evolution, highlighting tracks such as "Sata" and "Don't Believe It" as standouts. Resident Advisor, however, offered a more critical perspective, arguing that the album prioritized large-scale festival appeal over cohesive songwriting and criticizing its reliance on mainstream EDM structures.

Summit was booked for a nine-consecutive-Monday residency at [UNVRS] in Ibiza, to take place in June and July 2026.On September 18 and 19, he returned with the second annual Experts Only Festival, welcoming more than 60,000 attendees.John Summit will embark on his biggest headline run to date, an arena tour spanning across North America and including a landmark show at LA’s Coliseum, his biggest headline show to date.

== Influences ==
John Summit has named Lady Gaga among his biggest influences, admiring her artistry and visionary performances.

== Personal life ==
Summit currently lives in Miami, Florida, where he purchased a residence in early 2023.

== Discography ==
=== Studio albums ===
Title	Details	Peak chart positions				
Title	Details	US	US Dance/ Elec.	AUS	CAN	UK Dance
Comfort in Chaos	Released: July 12, 2024; Label: Experts Only, Darkroom; Formats: Digital download, streaming	39	2	—	48	11
Ctrl Escape	Released: April 15, 2026; Label: Experts Only, Darkroom; Formats: Digital download, streaming	194	9	62	—	—

=== Charting songs ===
Title	Year	Peak chart positions			Certifications	Album
Title	Year	US Dance/ Elec.	US Dance/Mix Airplay	UK Sales	Certifications	Album
"Deep End"	2020	26	—	45	RMNZ: Gold; BPI: Silver	Non-album singles
"Human" (featuring Echoes)	2021	26	1	—		Non-album singles
"Sun Came Up" (with Sofi Tukker)	2021	34	2	—		Non-album singles
"La Danza"	2022	40	—	82		Non-album singles
"What a Life" (with Guz featuring Steve Appleton)	2022	—	37	—		Non-album singles
"In Chicago"	2022	44	—	—		Non-album singles
"Revolution"	2022	47	—	—		Non-album singles
"Show Me" (featuring Hannah Boleyn)	2022	50	—	—		Non-album singles
"Where You Are" (with Hayla)	2023	8	1	—	RIAA: Gold; ARIA: Platinum; RMNZ: Platinum; BPI: Silver	Comfort in Chaos
"Fade Out" (featuring MKLA)	2023	28	—	—		Non-album singles
"Hungover" (with Mathame featuring Camden Cox)	2023	31	—	—		Non-album singles
"Sweet Disposition" (John Summit & Silver Panda Remix)	2024	—	10	—		Non-album singles
"Shiver" (with Hayla)	2024	8	4	—	ARIA: Gold; RMNZ: Gold	Comfort in Chaos
"Eat the Bass"	2024	36	—	—		Comfort in Chaos
"Go Back" (with Sub Focus featuring Julia Church)	2024	12	6	—	ARIA: Gold; RMNZ: Platinum	Comfort in Chaos
"Resonate" (with Kaskade featuring Julia Church)	2024	35	—	—		Comfort in Chaos
"Tears" (with Paige Cavell)	2024	22	33	—		Comfort in Chaos
"Palm of My Hands" (with Venbee)	2024	20	—	—		Comfort in Chaos
"Gas Pedal Remix" (with Subtronics, Tape B, and Sage the Gemini)	2024	19	—	—		Gas Pedal
"Focus" (featuring Cloves)	2025	5	—	—		Non-album singles
"Light Years" (featuring Inéz)	2025	4	—	—		Non-album singles
"Is Everybody Having Fun?" (with Gorgon City featuring Rhys from the Sticks)	2025	21	—	—		Non-album singles
"Crystallized" (featuring Inéz)	2025	5	—	—		Non-album singles
"I Wanna Go (John Summit Remix)" (with Britney Spears)	2025	22	—	—		Non-album singles
"Lights Go Out"	2026	7	—	—		Ctrl Escape
"Shadows" (with Lavinia)	2026	9	—	—		Ctrl Escape
"With Me" (with Julia Wolf)	2026	10	—	—		Ctrl Escape
"Sata" (with Rohaan)	2026	20	—	—		Ctrl Escape
"All the Time" (with The Chainsmokers and Ilsey)	2026	3	30	—		Ctrl Escape
"Chica 305" (with Feid)	2026	11	—	—		Ctrl Escape
"Shades of Blue" (with Devault and Julia Church)	2026	8	—	—		Ctrl Escape
"Don't Believe It" (with Absolutely)	2026	7	—	—		Ctrl Escape
"—" denotes a recording that did not chart or was not released.
