= Mathame =

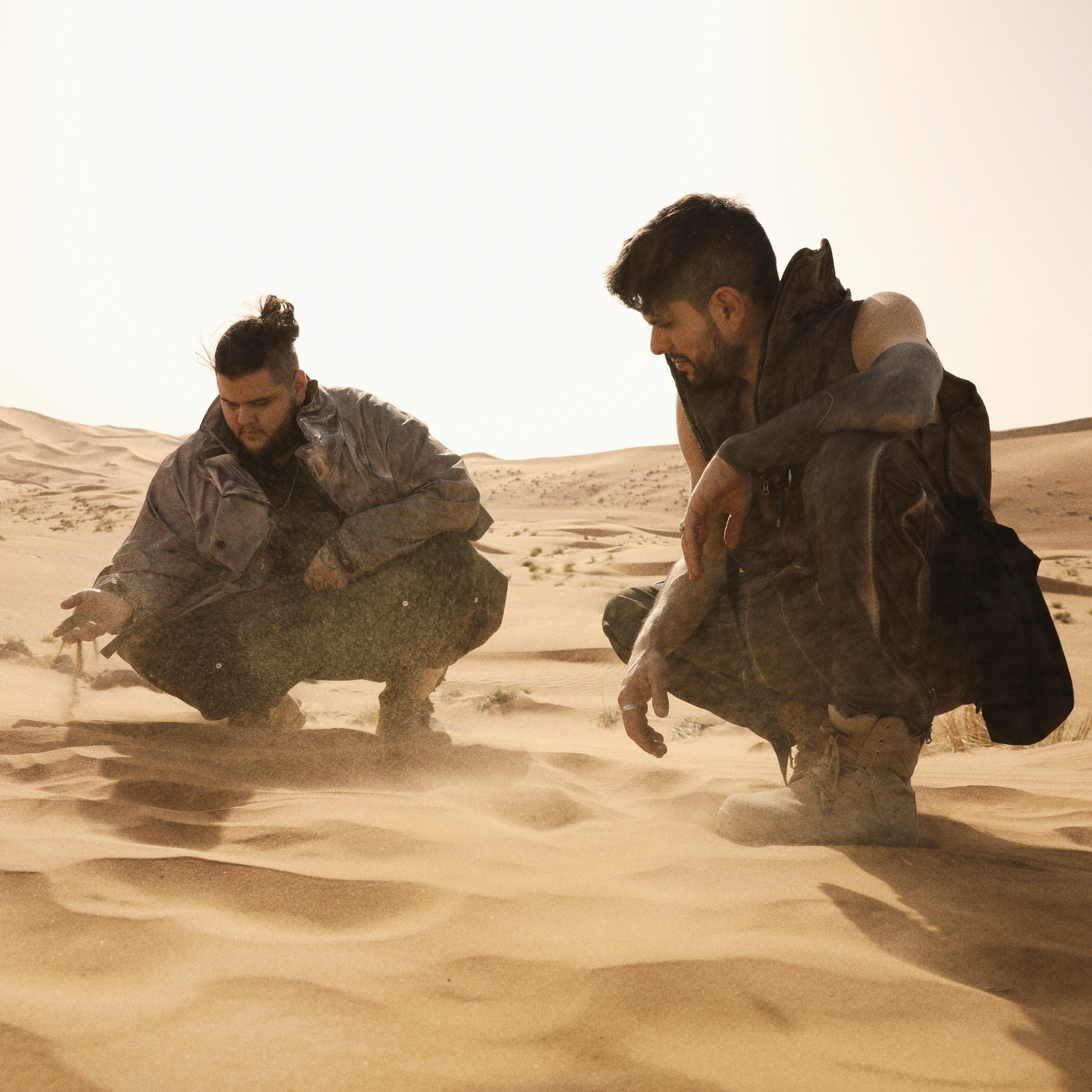

Background information
- Born: Matteo Giovanelli, Amedeo Giovanelli
- Years active: 2013-present
- Labels: Capitol/Astralwerks, Sony/B1, Afterlife
- Website: https://www.mathamemusic.com/

Mathame are an Italian DJ and production duo consisting of brothers Matteo and Amedeo Giovanelli.

== Career ==
Both brothers were trained in classical music, with Amedeo spending five years at a violin conservatory. In addition Matteo studied film, going on to work as a film director.

The brothers formed Mathame while living in Sicily at the base of the Mt. Etna volcano, helping to run their family's bed and breakfast, its isolation and unique geography influencing elements of their music. Mathame has been described as a combination of electronic music, dub techno and melodic house, taking influence from science-fiction, classical movie soundtracks, new technology and anime.

Rooted in the cinematic techno genre, Mathame's live Audio Visual (AV) show has been described as an immersive performance. Mathame also utilized AI programming in creating their show visuals, as well as some of their other artwork. Mathame tours globally, performing at locations including Coachella, Ultra Miami Resistance, Tomorrowland, Sonus Festival and others. Their work has been re-mixed by Diplo, Adriatique, and ZHU.

=== MEMO ===
Mathame released their debut album, entitled Memo, via Astralwerks on June 30, 2023. Work on MEMO began in 2019 and continued throughout the COVID-19 pandemic. The thirteen track body of work serves as a travel log of the duo's memories and emotions over a three-year period, focusing on leaving their Italian hometown, moving from lockdown, to being able to dance, then being locked down again.

Influenced by science fiction, other themes within MEMO include darkness and light, love, synthesis, and contrast. The four layers in each track are intended to be imagined as a character in a story, with the narrative within the tracklist order paying homage to Hero's Journey, a body of work by Joseph Campbell on the concept of the monomyth.

Mathame also utilized AI in their album artwork. Although they were unable to use it for the LP's visuals, due to UMG rules, it was used for the artwork of the following singles: Come for You, To Hope and the artwork and music video for So What.
