= Tim Clark (artist) =

Canadian artist

Timothy D. Clark
- Born: March 4, 1945 (age 81); Buckie, Scotland

Tim Clark (born March 4, 1945) is a Canadian multidisciplinary artist.

== Life ==
Timothy D. Clark was born March 4, 1945, in Buckie, Scotland. Clark lives in Montreal where he is a professor of studio art at Concordia University.

== Work ==
Clark is known for his work in photography, performance art and writing.
