= Kream =

Norwegian DJ duo

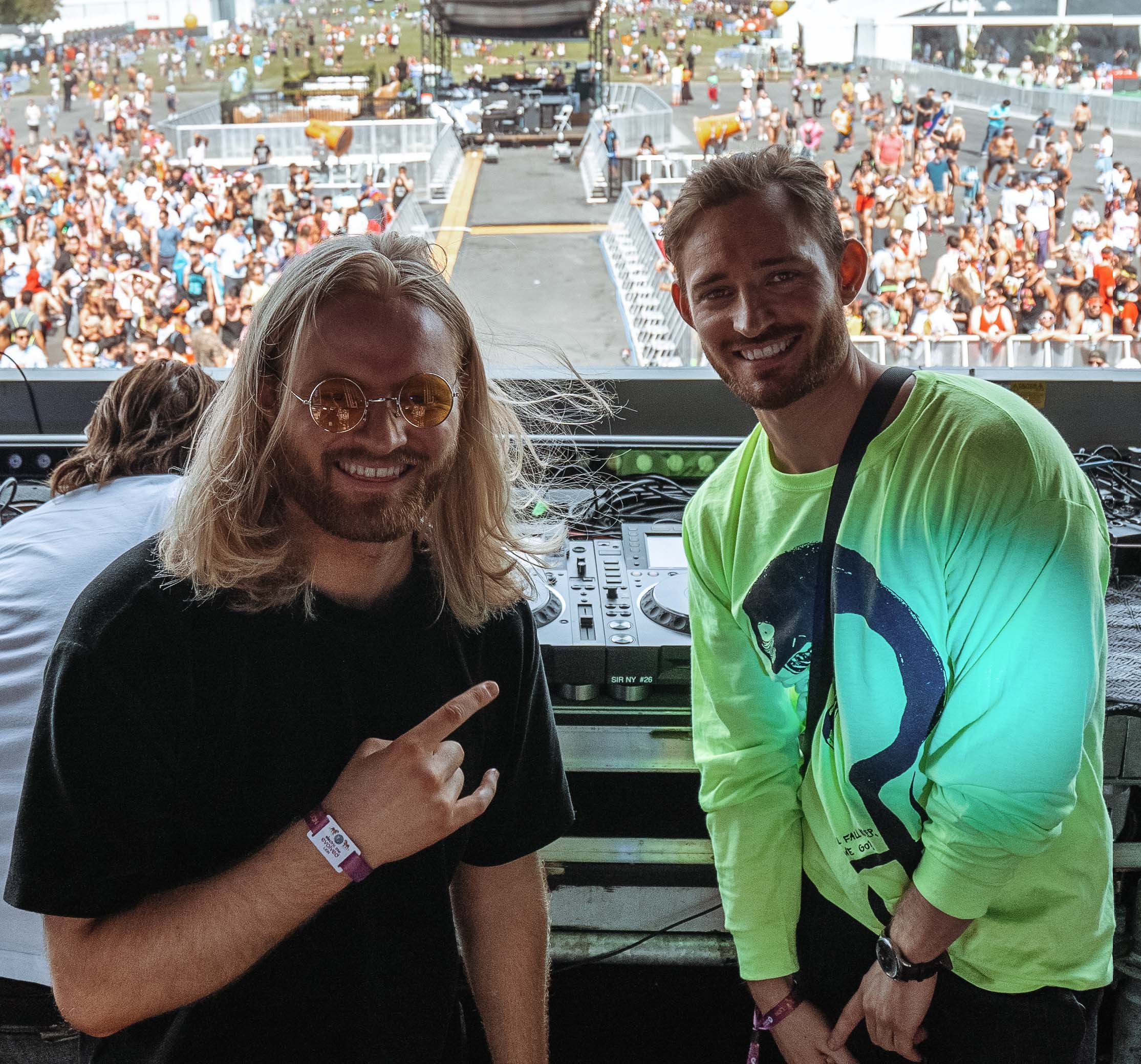

Background information
- Origin: Bergen, Norway
- Genre: Melodic techno
- Occupations: DJ; songwriter; record producer
- Instruments: Programming; piano; keyboards
- Years active: 2015–present
- Labels: Atlantic, Big Beat, Musical Freedom
- Members: Daniel Slettebakken; Markus Slettebakken
- Website: www.wearekream.com

Kream (stylised as KREAM) is a Norwegian DJ and record producer duo consisting of brothers Daniel and Markus Slettebakken, from Bergen.

== Career ==
=== 2016–2019 ===
In 2017 Kream signed with Atlantic Records / Big Beat Records and released the song "Taped Up Heart", which features vocals from Clara Mae. The song charted on Billboard's Hot/Dance Electronic Songs chart and peaked at 22. The record has as of 2024 been played nearly 100 million times on Spotify.

On 21 September 2018, Kream released the song "Decisions" featuring Maia Wright. The song reached number 39 on the Billboard Dance Chart.

=== 2020–present ===
In response to the COVID-19 pandemic of 2020, Kream started the livestream project Liqud : Lab. The shows were recorded at spectacular locations around Norway, showcasing modern architecture and scenery.

In December 2020, Kream became the first Norwegian act to reach the number one spot on 1001Tracklist.com with their single "About You"

On 9 December 2022, Kream released their first EP Reverie, featuring the previously released singles "Rendezvous" and "Chemistry".

== Discography ==
- === Singles ===
  Title	Year	Album/EP
  "Love You More"	2016	N/A
  "Another Life" (feat. Mark Asari)	2016	N/A
  "Taped Up Heart" (feat. Clara Mae)	2016	N/A
  "Drowning" (with Clara Mae)	2017	N/A
  "Know This Love" (feat. Litens)	2018	N/A
  "Deep End"	2018	N/A
  "Decisions" (feat. Maia Wright)	2018	N/A
  "Enough" (with Cazztek and Shoffy)	2018	N/A
  "Ain't Thinkin Bout You" (with Eden Prince feat. Louisa)	2019	N/A
  "Go Somewhere" (with RANI)	2019	N/A
  "Jack" (with Black Caviar)	2020	N/A
  "Choices" (with Imanos)	2020	N/A
  "Lies" (with Steve Aoki)	2020	N/A
  "Water" (feat. Zohara)	2020	N/A
  "About You"	2020	N/A
  "Take Control"	2021	N/A
  "Roads"	2021	N/A
  "Roads" (featuring Dan Caplen)	2021	N/A
  "Want You Bad" (with Punctual)	2021	N/A
  "What You've Done to Me" (with Millean featuring Bemendé)	2021	N/A
  "Pressure"	2022	Reverie
  "Chemistry" (with Camden Cox and Idemi)	2022	Reverie
  "Once Again" (with Jake Tarry)	2022	Reverie
  "Rendezvous" (feat. Marlo Rex)	2022	Reverie
  "Cold"	2022	Reverie
  "Numb"	2022	Reverie
  "Reverie"	2022	Reverie
  "I Need a Miracle" (featuring Coco Star)	2023	
  "Sweat"	2023	
  "So Hï"	2024	
  "The Switch"	2024	
  "Blur" (featuring Marlo Rex)	2024	
  "Wicked Game"	2024	
  "Where Are You Tonight"	2024	
  "Dis Side" (with Travis Scott)	2024	
  "Blue Symphony" (with Jem Cooke)	2025	
  "Arrival"	2025	
  "Paradise" (with Goodboys)	2025	
  "Weightless" (with Cadmen Cox)	2025	
  "Manta"	2025	
  "Se Que Quiere" (with RUBACK)	2025	
  "Subelo"	2025	
  "Dangerous" (with Alika)	2025	
  "The Answer"	2026	
  "Paradigm"	2026	
  "Turn Up the Dose" (with Script)	2026	
  "Annihilation" (with Korolova)	2026	
  "Serotonin" (with MORTEN)	2026	
- === Remixes ===
  Title	Year
  Tove Lo - Talking Body (KREAM Remix)	2015
  Major Lazer - Too Original (KREAM Remix)	2015
  Major Lazer - Lean On (KREAM Remix)	2015
  Duke Dumont - Need U 100% (KREAM Remix)	2015
  M-22 - Good To Be Loved (KREAM Remix)	2015
  Jess Glynne - Don't Be So Hard On Yourself (KREAM Remix)	2016
  Dua Lipa - New Rules (KREAM Remix)	2017
  Zara Larsson - Only You (KREAM Remix)	2017
  Tove Lo - Disco Tits (KREAM Remix)	2017
  Anne Marie - 2002 (KREAM Remix)	2018
  KYLE - Playinwitme (feat. Kehlani) (KREAM Remix)	2018
  Bazzi - Beautiful (KREAM Remix)	2018
  Shakka - Man Down ft. AlunaGeorge (KREAM Remix)	2018
  Ava Max - Torn - (KREAM Remix)	2019
  Michael Calfan & Martin Solveig - No Lie (KREAM Remix)	2020
  The Weeknd - After Hours (KREAM Remix)	2020
  Robin Schulz ft. Alida - In Your Eyes (KREAM Remix)	2020
  RAYE - Call On Me (KREAM Remix)	2021
  Deadmau5 & Frank Ocean - Strobe (KREAM Remix)	2021
  Swedish House Mafia - It Gets Better (KREAM Remix)	2021
  Meduza & Hozier - Tell It To My Heart (KREAM Remix)	2022
  Swedish House Mafia & The Weeknd - Moth to a Flame (KREAM Remix)	2022
  Kate Bush - Running Up That Hill (KREAM Remix)	2022
  Drake - Massive (KREAM Remix)	2022
  Rui da Silva - Touch Me (KREAM Remix)	2022
  SZA - Shirt (KREAM Remix)	2022
  KX5 ft. The Moth & The Flame - Alive (KREAM Remix)	2023
  Nina Simone - Sinnerman (KREAM Remix)	2023
  Mau P - Dress Code (KREAM Remix)	2024
  RY X - Moths (KREAM Remix)	2024
  Florence + The Machine - Spectrum (KREAM Remix)	2024
  Tiësto, Poppy Baskcomb - Drifting (KREAM Remix)	2024
  Anyma - Pictures of You (KREAM Remix)	2024
  Gordo & Drake - Healing (KREAM Remix)	2024
  The Weeknd & Playboi Carti - Timeless (KREAM Remix)	2024
  Anyma - Hypnotized ft. Ellie Goulding (KREAM Remix)	2025
  Steve Angello - Tivoli (KREAM Remix)	2025
  ILLENIUM & HAYLA - In My Arms (KREAM Remix)	2025

== Gallery ==
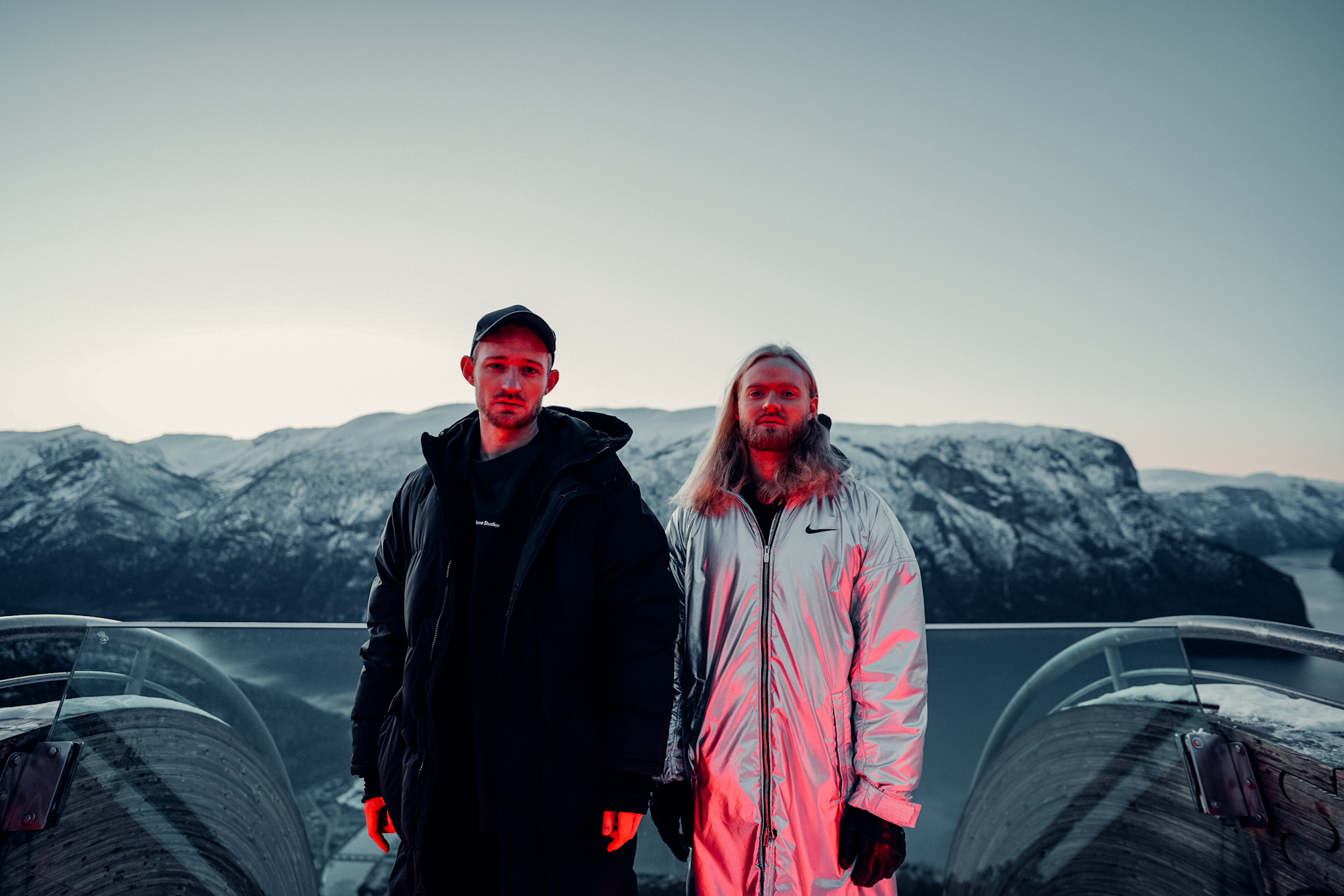
KREAM during Liquid : Lab vol. 4 at Stegastein, Norway

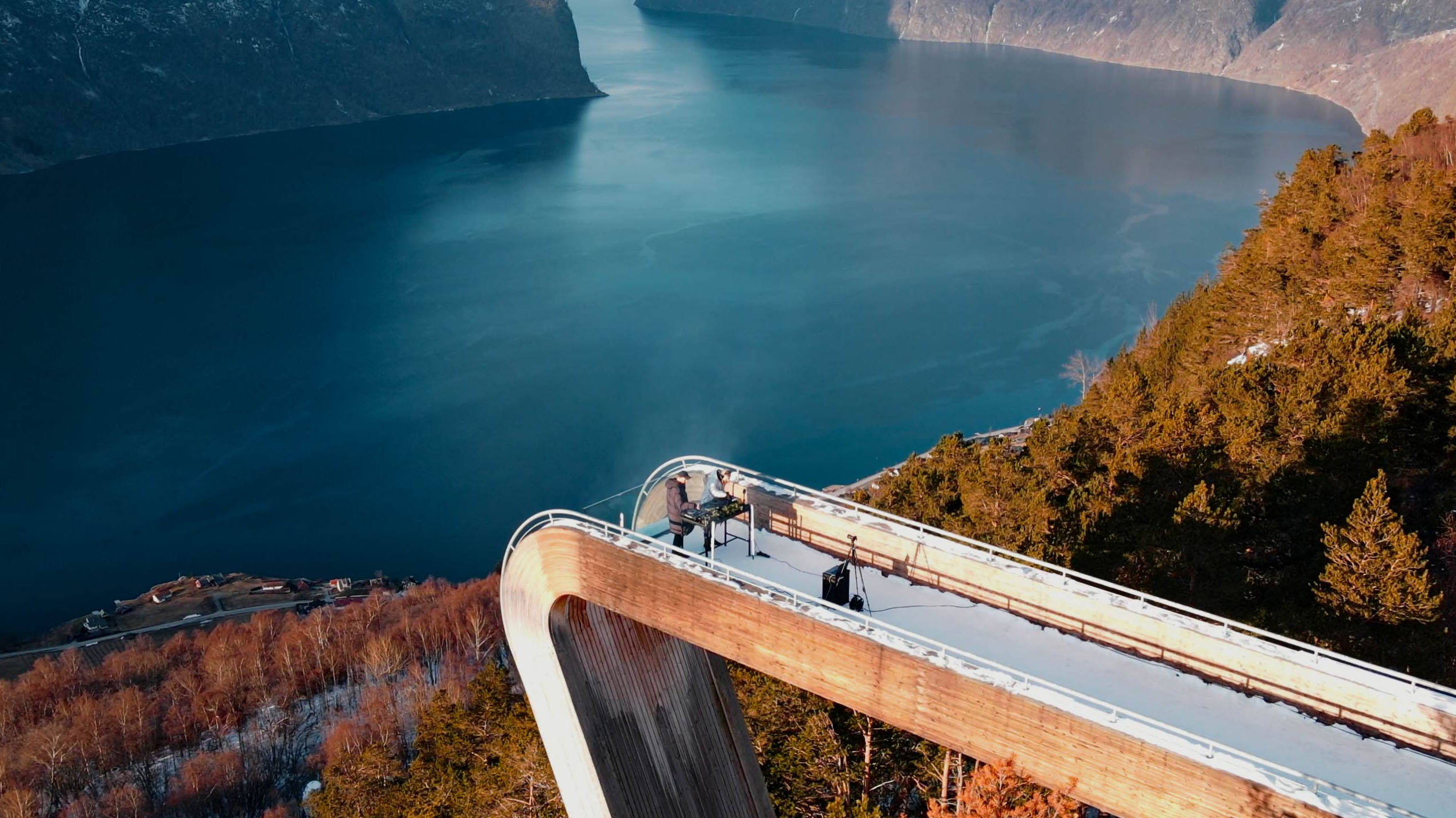
KREAM during Liquid : Lab vol. 4 at Stegastein, Norway

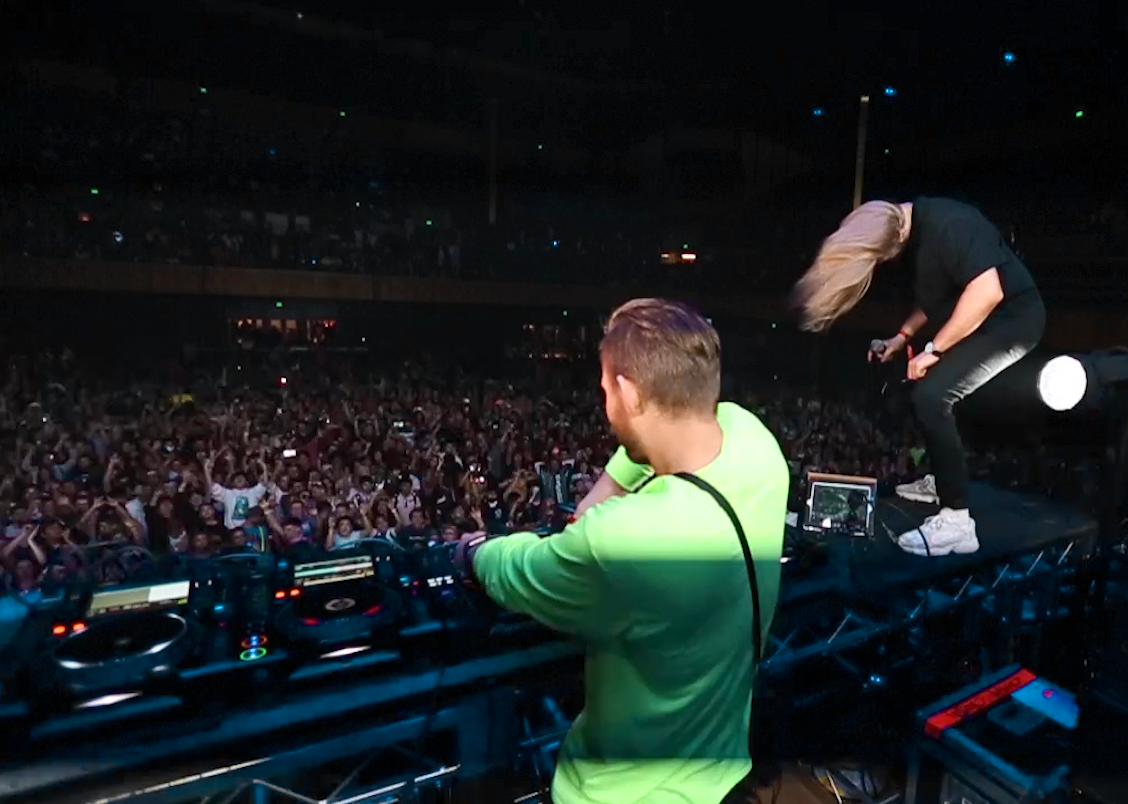
Kream in San Francisco 2020

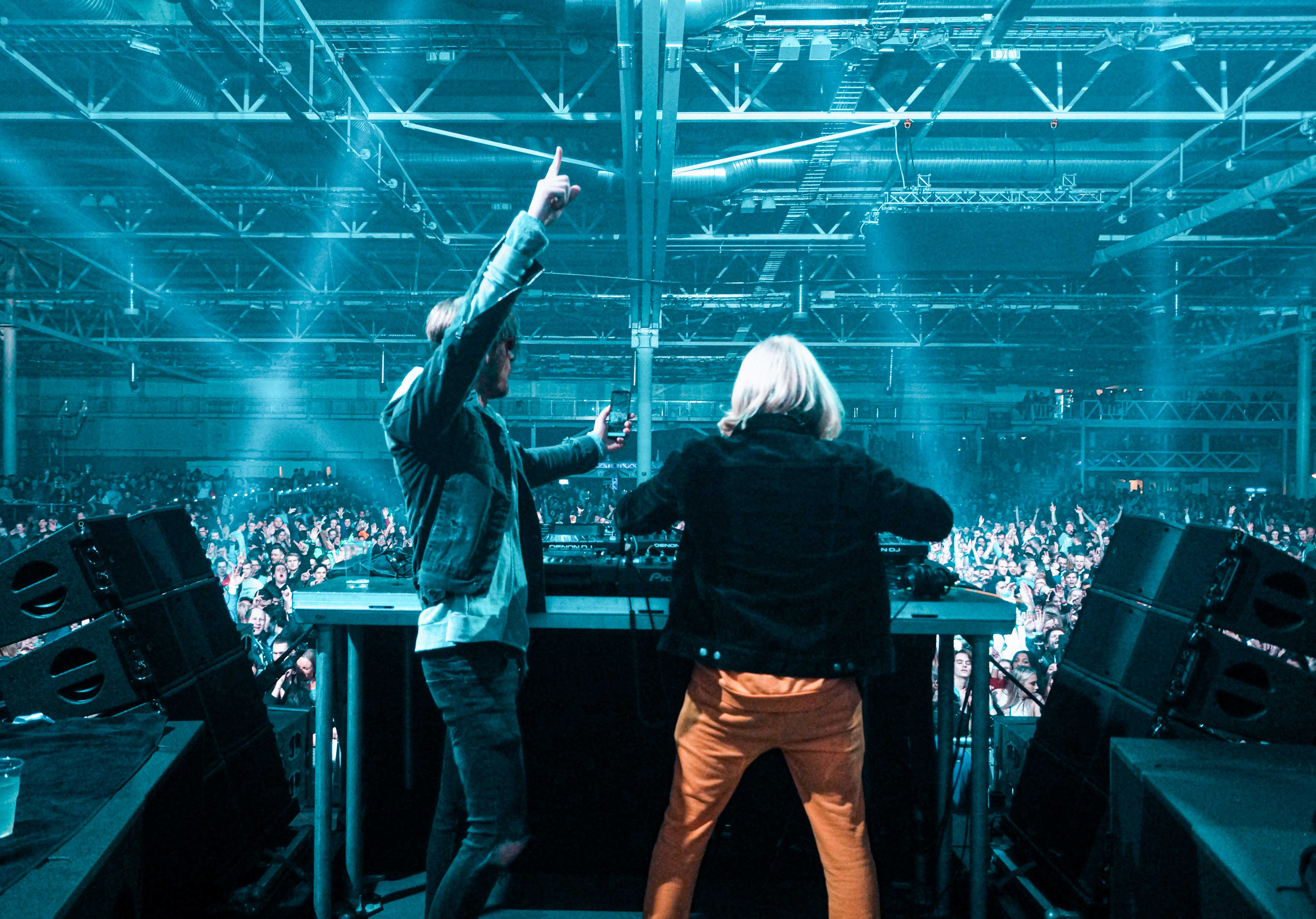
Kream in Stavanger 2018

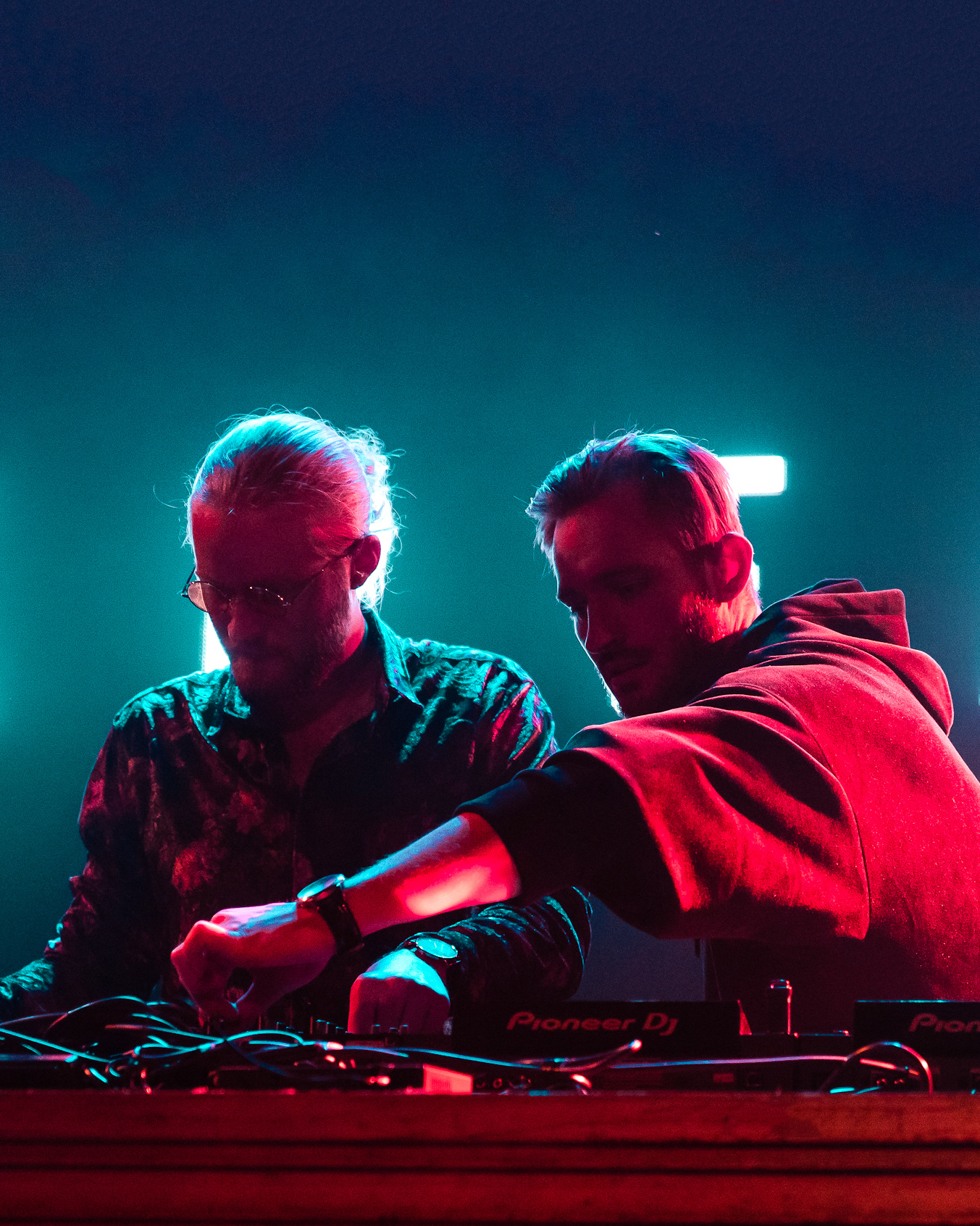
Kream in New York 2019

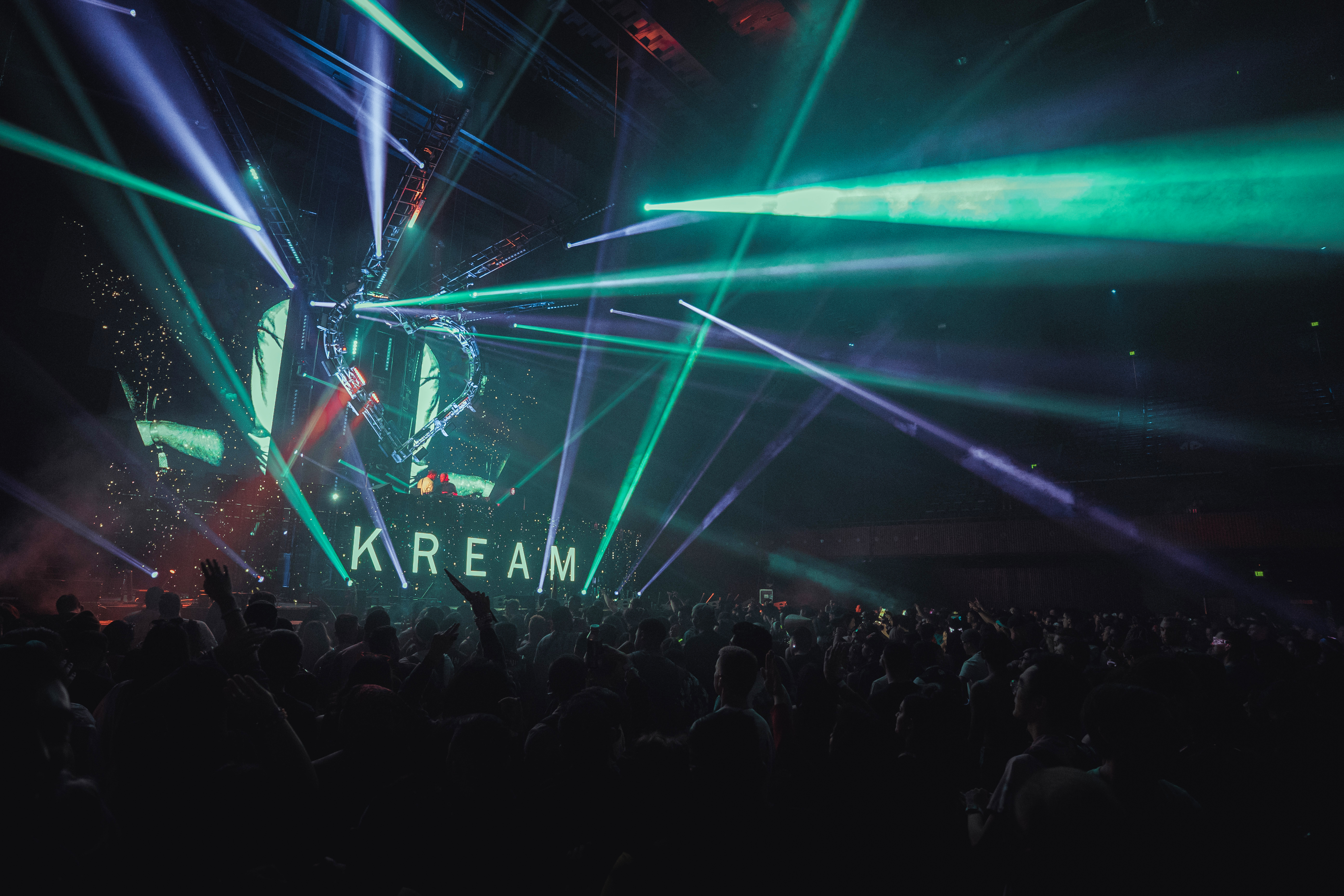
Kream in Bill Graham Civic Auditorium 2020
