= Hayla =

- Williams in 2024

Background information
- Born: Hayley Philippa Williams; 1988 (age 37–38); Formby, England
- Genres: EDM; progressive house; dance pop
- Years active: 2016–present
- Labels: Believe UK; Restless Minds Music; Good Company Records

Hayley Philippa Williams (born 1988), known professionally as Hayla, is an English singer-songwriter and producer. She has won six Electronic Dance Music Awards, including Vocalist of the Year in 2024 and Female Artist of the Year in 2025. She also earned a Grammy Award nomination for contributing to Deadmau5 and Kaskade's album Kx5 (2023).

== Early life ==
Williams is from Formby, Merseyside.

== Career ==
In 2016, Williams had her first vocal feature on DJ Katch's track "Lights Out (Too Drunk)". This was followed by collaborations with Wilkinson in 2018, The City and Mant in 2019 as well as features on the singles "Juggernaut" by Cymo and "Waiting All My Life" by PBH & JACK. She collaborated with Ben Nicky on the 2021 single "Where Were You".

Williams co-wrote the song "Escape" with Will Clarke. Initially intended for Clarke, the song was given to Deadmau5 and Kaskade. Featuring Williams, it ended up being the duo's debut single in 2022 and lead single of their album Kx5. This earned Williams her first Grammy Award nomination. The song also won Dance Radio Song for the Year at the 2022 Electronic Dance Music Awards (EDMAs).

In 2023, Williams collaborated with John Summit on the single "Where You Are". At the 2024 EDMAs, Williams won Vocalist of the Year and was nominated for Female Artist of the Year. In addition, "Where You Are" won Dance Song of the Year and was nominated in the Dance Radio, House, DnB, Festival and Remix categories.

Williams' debut album Dusk was released in 2024. Singles included "Embers" and "Freefall". She collaborated with Kygo on the single "Without You" and supported him on tour in late 2024 and early 2025, as well as Meduza on "Another World". She also reunited with John Summit for the single "Shiver". Williams won Female Artist of the Year at the 2025 EDMAs and was nominated for Vocalist of the Year. "Another World" won Dance Song of the Year, while "Shiver" won Best Remix. "Without You" and "Another World" were both nominated for Collaboration of the Year. "Shiver" was nominated for Dance Radio Song of the Year.

In 2025, Williams collaborated with Illenium on "In My Arms", the lead single on his album Odyssey, and Nelly Furtado on "Faded". "In My Arms" was nominated for an iHeart Radio Music Award in the Dance Song category. "Faded" was nominated for Best Collaboration at the 2026 EDMAs. Williams was also nominated for Vocalist and Female Artist of the Year again as well as Dance Radio Artist of the Year. In addition, Williams won Best Vocalist at the Femmy Awards. She performed at the 2025 Electric Daisy Carnival, World Pride Music Festival, Electric Forest and embarked on a tour that autumn.

William's second album Dark was released in 2026. She returned to the World Pride Music Festival and Electric Daisy Carnival, and also performed at ÎleSoniq Music Festival.

== Artistry ==
Through her parents, Williams grew up listening to Fleetwood Mac, Paul Simon, Toto, Labi Siffre, T. Rex, Vivaldi, Vanessa-Mae, Ella Fitzgerald, Billie Holiday and Celine Dion. At a young age, Williams discovered Whitney Houston through The Bodyguard, describing Houston as "my #1 idol". She discovered Björk through the album Post (1995).

When writing her debut album Dusk, Williams drew upon Portishead, Massive Attack and Bonobo. In 2024 and 2025, she also cited Imogen Heap, Romy Madley Croft and The xx, FKA Twigs, Grimes, Sia and Radiohead.

== Discography ==
=== Albums ===
- DUSK (2024)
- DARK (2026)

=== Live albums ===
- HAYLA at EDC Las Vegas 2026: Kinetic Field Stage (2026)

=== Singles ===
- "I Need" (2018) with Wilkinson
- "Better" (2019) with The City
- "Lonely Days" (2019) with MANT
- "Naked" (2020)
- "Running" (2020) with Maxinne
- "Colours" (2021)
- "Where Were You" (2021) with Ben Nicky
- "Rescue" (2021) with Friend Within
- "Treading Water" (2022)
- "Unfold" (2022)
- "Where You Are" (2023) with John Summit
- "I Found You" (2023) with Sub Focus
- "Fall Again" (2023)
- "Shiver" (2024) with John Summit
- "Embers" (2024)
- "Freefall" (2024)
- "Without You" (2024) with Kygo
- "Another World" (2024) with Meduza
- "Only I" (2024)
- "In My Arms" (2025) with Illenium
- "FADED" (2025) with Nelly Furtado
- "Heal" (2026)
- "Enough" (2026)
- "Easier" (2026)

=== As featured artist ===
- "Lights Out (Too Drunk)" (2016) by DJ Katch
- "Juggernaut" (2019) by Cymo
- "Waiting All My Life" (2019) by PBH & JACK
- "Escape" (2022) by Deadmau5 and Kaskade
