= Kx5 (album) =

2023 studio album by Kx5

Studio album by Kx5
- Released: March 17, 2023
- Genres: House; techno
- Length: 43:34
- Labels: Mau5trap; Arkade
- Producers: Richard Beynon; Finn Bjarnson; Will Clarke; Camden Cox; Maximilian Jaeger; Eddie Jenkins; Tucker Halpern; Sophie Hawley-Weld; Steven Mits; Marco Porombka; Kenneth Pyfer; Ryan Raddon; Thomas Shaw; Richard Walters; Joel Zimmerman

Singles from Kx5
- 1. "Escape" Released: March 11, 2022; 2. "Take Me High" Released: September 16, 2022; 3. "Alive" Released: October 8, 2022; 4. "Avalanche" Released: November 11, 2022; 5. "When I Talk" Released: December 9, 2022; 6. "Sacrifice" Released: February 17, 2023

Kx5 is the debut album by Kx5, the collaborative project of Canadian producer Deadmau5 and American producer Kaskade. It was released on March 17, 2023, through Mau5trap and Arkade.

== Background ==
Deadmau5 and Kaskade have collaborated several times since 2008, with previous songs including "I Remember", "Move for Me", and "Beneath with Me".

On March 11, 2022, the pair released their debut single under the name Kx5, "Escape", featuring Hayla. Deadmau5 told Dancing Astronaut that the song is a "throwback to that kind of minimalistic approach, to that melodic sing-songy house". The song peaked at number 11 on the Billboard Dance/Electronic Songs chart.

On September 6, the duo announced that they would be releasing an album, and they issued the single "Take Me High" on September 16.

The self-titled album came out on March 17.

== Track listing ==
Kx5 track listing
No.	Title	Writer(s)	Producer(s)	Length
1.	"Alive" (featuring the Moth & the Flame)	Ryan Raddon; Joel Zimmerman; Finn Bjarnson; Steven Mits; Kenneth Pyfer; Brandon Robbins; Thomas Shaw	Raddon; Zimmerman; Bjarnson; Pyfer; Shaw	5:08
2.	"Sacrifice" (with Sofi Tukker)	Raddon; Zimmerman; Richard Beynon; Bjarnson; Tucker Halpern; Sophie Hawley-Weld; Mits	Raddon; Zimmerman; Beynon; Bjarnson; Halpern; Hawley-Weld; Mits	4:39
3.	"Escape" (featuring Hayla)	Raddon; Zimmerman; Will Clarke; Camden Cox; Eddie Jenkins; Hayley Philippa Williams	Raddon; Zimmerman; Clarke; Cox; Jenkins	4:00
4.	"Bright Lights" (featuring AR/CO)	Raddon; Zimmerman	Raddon; Zimmerman	3:23
5.	"Pwdr Blu" (featuring Brother.)	Raddon; Zimmerman; Bjarnson; Collin Emery; Mits; Pyfer		3:36
6.	"When I Talk" (with Elderbrook)	Raddon; Zimmerman; Bjarnson; Maximilian Jaeger; Alexander Kotz; Mits; Brandon Santell	Raddon; Zimmerman; Jaeger	3:27
7.	"Eat Sleep" (featuring Richard Walters)	Raddon; Zimmerman; Bjarnson; Mits; Richard Walters	Raddon; Zimmerman; Bjarnson; Mits; Walters	4:30
8.	"Take Me High"	Raddon; Zimmerman; Bjarnson; Mits	Raddon; Zimmerman; Bjarnson; Mits	4:15
9.	"Avalanche" (featuring James French)	Raddon; Zimmerman; Bjarnson; Johan Brinkhuis; Mits; James Oliver; Marco Porombka	Raddon; Zimmerman; Bjarnson; Mits; Porombka	4:21
10.	"Unobsidian"	Raddon; Zimmerman	Raddon; Zimmerman	6:11
Total length:				43:34

== Reception ==
Professional ratings
Review scores
Source	Rating
AllMusic	4.5/5 stars

Kx5 was generally well-received by critics. Zach Salafia of Dancing Astronaut called the album "one of the year's best and most influential albums". Sebastian Flores Chong of EDMTunes described the album as "an unexpected, yet welcomed one". Ellie Mullins of We Rave You described the album as "mixing nostalgic dance with the expertise of production that only Kaskade and deadmau5 can keep so fresh".

Catherine Smith from MXdawn wrote: Kx5 is a great EDM album that fans of both electronic, as well as pop, will enjoy. Its foot-tapping rhythms and gritty bass tones provide this record with depth and feeling. The album manages to keep a consistent energy throughout each song, with its driving beats and heavy synthesizers. Though many of the songs on the album seem to blend together, the vocals are what help each track stand apart. Fans of EDM and pop will definitely want to listen to this new album by Kx5.

== LA Coliseum performance ==
On December 10, 2022, following their debut performance at EDC 2022, Kx5 performed a set at the LA Coliseum. The event drew more than 46,000 attendees and was reported as the largest ticketed global dance event of 2022. During the performance, a backstage generator malfunction caused a temporary power outage, briefly interrupting the show before it resumed after the issue was resolved.

== Charts ==
Chart performance for Kx5
Chart (2023)	Peak position
US Top Dance Albums (Billboard)	6
