= Illenium discography =

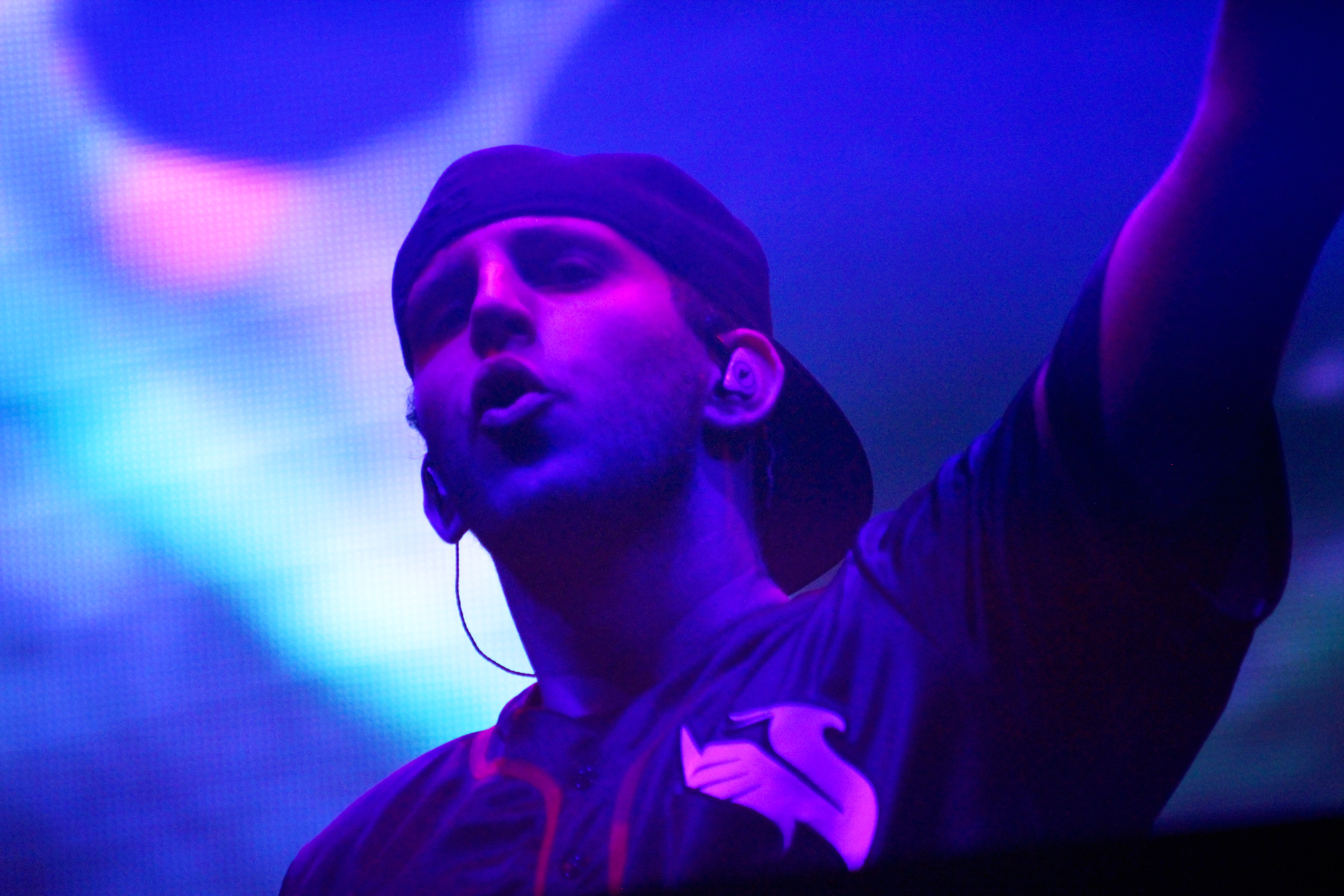
- Studio albums: 6
- EPs: 4
- Singles: 65
- Music videos: 11
- Remix albums: 5

The discography of American electronic music producer and DJ Illenium consists of six studio albums, four remix albums, four extended plays, thirty-six singles and eight music videos.

== Albums ==
=== Studio albums ===
List of studio albums, with selected chart positions and album details
Title	Details	Peak chart positions					Certifications
Title	Details	US	US Dance	US Heat	AUS	CAN	Certifications
Ashes	Released: February 15, 2016; Label: Kasaya / Seeking Blue; Format: Digital download, vinyl	—	6	19	—	—	
Awake	Released: September 21, 2017; Label: Kasaya / Seeking Blue; Format: Digital download, vinyl	106	3	7	—	92	
Ascend	Released: August 16, 2019; Label: Kasaya / Astralwerks; Format: Digital download, CD, vinyl	14	1	—	54	12	RIAA: Gold
Fallen Embers	Released: July 16, 2021; Label: Warner; Format: Digital download, streaming	49	1	—	99	49	
Illenium	Released: April 28, 2023; Label: Warner; Format: Digital download, CD, vinyl	42	1	—	—	68	
Odyssey	Released: February 6, 2026; Label: Republic; Format: Digital download, CD, vinyl	45	1	—	—	—	
"—" denotes a recording that did not chart or was not released in that territory.

=== Remix albums ===
List of remix albums, with selected chart positions and album details
Title	Details	Peak chart positions
Title	Details	US Dance
Ashes (Remixes)	Released: December 16, 2016; Label: Kasaya / Seeking Blue; Format: Digital download	—
Awake (Remixes)	Released: June 18, 2018; Label: Kasaya / Seeking Blue; Format: Digital download	—
Ascend (Remixes)	Released: May 15, 2020; Label: Astralwerks; Format: Digital download	5
Fallen Embers (Remixes)	Released: May 27, 2022; Label: Warner Records; Format: Digital download	-
Illenium (Remixes)	Released: September 29, 2023; Label: Warner Records; Format: Digital download	-
"—" denotes a recording that did not chart or was not released in that territory.

== Extended plays ==
Title	Details
Illenium	Released: May 20, 2013; Label: Prep School Recordings; Format: Digital download, streaming
Risen	Released: January 14, 2014; Label: Self-released; Format: Digital download
Painted White (with Cristina Soto and Said the Sky)	Released: July 21, 2015; Label: Gravitas Recordings; Format: Digital download
Ascend (Tour Edits)	Released: June 12, 2020; Label: Astralwerks; Format: Digital download

== Singles ==
List of singles as lead artist, with selected chart positions, showing year released and album name
Title	Year	Peak chart positions										Certifications	Album
Title	Year	US	US Dance	US Dance Dig.	US Dance Air.	US Rock	CAN	GER	NOR	NZ	SWE	Certifications	Album
"Drop Our Hearts, Pt. 2" (with Said the Sky featuring Sirma)	2014	—	—	—	—	—	—	—	—	—	—		Non-album singles
"Make Me Do"	2014	—	—	—	—	—	—	—	—	—	—		Non-album singles
"So Wrong"	2014	—	—	—	—	—	—	—	—	—	—		Non-album singles
"The Phoenix"	2014	—	—	—	—	—	—	—	—	—	—		Non-album singles
"In Your Wake" (featuring Jeza)	2014	—	—	—	—	—	—	—	—	—	—		Non-album singles
"Falling In" (with Said The Sky featuring Mimi Page)	2015	—	—	—	—	—	—	—	—	—	—		Non-album singles
"Spirals" (featuring King Deco)	2015	—	—	—	—	—	—	—	—	—	—		Ashes
"I'll Be Your Reason"	2015	—	—	—	—	—	—	—	—	—	—		Ashes
"Jester"	2015	—	—	—	—	—	—	—	—	—	—		Ashes
"Afterlife" (featuring Echos)	2016	—	—	—	—	—	—	—	—	—	—		Ashes
"Fortress" (featuring Joni Fatora)	2016	—	—	—	—	—	—	—	—	—	—		Ashes
"Bring Forth the Pressure" (with Dirt Monkey)	2016	—	—	—	—	—	—	—	—	—	—		Ashes
"Rush Over Me" (with Said The Sky and Seven Lions featuring Haliene)	2016	—	50	35	—	—	—	—	—	—	—		Non-album single
"Fractures" (featuring Nevve)	2017	—	42	—	—	—	—	—	—	—	—		Awake
"Feel Good" (with Gryffin featuring Daya)	2017	—	17	18	18	—	—	—	—	— (Note: "Feel Good" did not enter the NZ Top 40 Singles Chart but peaked at number 6 on the NZ Heatseekers chart.)	—	RIAA: Gold; RMNZ: Platinum	Awake
"Sound of Walking Away" (with Kerli)	2017	—	50	—	—	—	—	—	—	—	—		Awake
"Where the Wild Things Are" (with Zeds Dead)	2017	—	—	—	—	—	—	—	—	—	—		Non-album single
"Crawl Outta Love" (featuring Annika Wells)	2017	—	30	—	—	—	—	—	—	—	—		Awake
"Leaving"	2017	—	35	15	—	—	—	—	—	—	—		Awake
"Don't Give Up on Me" (with Kill the Noise featuring Mako)	2018	—	35	—	—	—	—	—	—	—	—		Non-album single
"Sound of Where'd You Go" (with Said The Sky, 1788-L, and Kerli)	2018	—	—	—	—	—	—	—	—	—	—		Awake (Remixes)
"Gold (Stupid Love)" (with Excision featuring Shallows)	2018	—	19	8	—	—	—	—	—	—	—		Apex
"Take You Down"	2018	—	23	7	—	—	—	—	—	—	—		Ascend
"God Damnit" (with Call Me Karizma)	2018	—	33	—	—	—	—	—	—	—	—		Non-album single
"Crashing" (featuring Bahari)	2019	—	20	14	33	—	—	—	—	—	—	RIAA: Gold	Ascend
"Pray" (featuring Kameron Alexander)	2019	—	25	8	—	—	—	—	—	—	—		Ascend
"Good Things Fall Apart" (with Jon Bellion)	2019	— (Note: "Good Things Fall Apart" did not enter the Billboard Hot 100, but peaked at number one on the Bubbling Under Hot 100 chart.)	3	2	—	— (Note: "Good Things Fall Apart" did not enter the Billboard Rock & Alternative Songs chart, but peaked at number six on the Rock & Alternative Airplay chart.)	—	—	—	— (Note: "Good Things Fall Apart" did not enter the NZ Top 40 Singles Chart, but peaked at number 38 on the NZ Hot Singles Chart.)	—	RIAA: 2× Platinum; RMNZ: Gold	Ascend
"Takeaway" (with The Chainsmokers featuring Lennon Stella)	2019	69	3	1	1	—	31	30	29	— (Note: "Takeaway" did not enter the NZ Top 40 Singles Chart, but peaked at number 3 on the NZ Hot Singles Chart.)	38	RIAA: 2× Platinum; BPI: Silver; ARIA: Platinum; BEA: Gold; BVMI: Gold; MC: Platinum; RMNZ: Platinum	Ascend and World War Joy
"Blood" (with Foy Vance)	2019	—	29	—	—	—	—	—	—	—	—		Ascend
"Hard to Say Goodbye" (with Ekali featuring Chloe Angelides)	2019	—	30	24	—	—	—	—	—	—	—		A World Away
"Feel Something" (with Excision featuring I Prevail)	2020	—	8	3	—	—	—	—	—	—	—		Non-album single
"Nightlight" (with Annika Wells)	2020	—	8	4	1	15	—	—	—	—	—		Fallen Embers
"Paper Thin" (with Tom DeLonge and Angels & Airwaves)	2020	—	10	3	—	23	—	—	—	—	—		Fallen Embers
"Hearts on Fire" (with Dabin featuring Lights)	2020	—	11	—	1	35	—	—	—	— (Note: "Hearts on Fire" did not enter the NZ Top 40 Singles Chart, but peaked at number 16 on the NZ Hot Singles Chart.)	—		Fallen Embers
"First Time" (with Iann Dior)	2021	—	—	—	—	23	—	—	—	— (Note: "First Time" did not enter the NZ Top 40 Singles Chart, but peaked at number 21 on the NZ Hot Singles Chart.)	—		Fallen Embers
"Sideways" (with Nurko featuring Valerie Broussard)	2021	—	10	—	11	—	—	—	—	— (Note: "Sideways" did not enter the NZ Top 40 Singles Chart, but peaked at number 33 on the NZ Hot Singles Chart.)	—		Fallen Embers
"Heavenly Side" (with Matt Maeson)	2021	—	12	—	—	37	—	—	—	—	—		Fallen Embers
"Wouldn't Change a Thing" (with Thirty Seconds to Mars)	2021	—	14	5	—	38	—	—	—	—	—		Fallen Embers
"Story of My Life" (with Sueco featuring Trippie Redd)	2021	—	11	—	—	—	—	—	—	—	—		Non-album single
"Walk Me Home" (with Said the Sky and Chelsea Cutler)	2022	—	—	—	—	—	—	—	—	—	—		Sentiment
"Shivering" (featuring Spiritbox)	2022	—	15	—	—	—	—	—	—	—	—		Illenium
"Don't Let Me Let Go" (with Dillon Francis and Evan Giia)	2022	—	15	—	3	—	—	—	—	—	—		This Mixtape Is Fire Too
"All That Really Matters" (with Teddy Swims)	2022	—	13	—	3	—	—	—	—	—	—	BPI: Silver; RMNZ: Platinum	Illenium
"From the Ashes" (with Skylar Grey)	2022	—	19	—	—	—	—	—	—	—	—		Illenium
"Worst Day" (featuring Max)	2022	—	16	—	—	—	—	—	—	— (Note: "Worst Day" did not enter the NZ Top 40 Singles Chart, but peaked at number 40 on the NZ Hot Singles Chart.)	—		Illenium
"Luv Me a Little" (featuring Nina Nesbitt)	2023	—	11	—	1	—	—	—	—	— (Note: "Luv Me a Little" did not enter the NZ Top 40 Singles Chart, but peaked at number 40 on the NZ Hot Singles Chart.)	—		Illenium
"Insanity" (with American Teeth)	2023	—	16	—	—	—	—	—	—	—	—		Illenium
"With All My Heart" (with Jvke)	2023	—	12	—	—	—	—	—	—	—	—		Illenium
"Eyes Wide Shut" (with Avril Lavigne and Travis Barker)	2023	—	9	—	—	27	—	—	—	— (Note: "Eyes Wide Shut" did not enter the NZ Top 40 Singles Chart, but peaked at number 24 on the NZ Hot Singles Chart.)	—		Illenium
"See You Again" (with The Chainsmokers featuring Carlie Hanson)	2023	—	13	17	—	—	—	—	—	—	—		Summertime Friends
"Zombie" (with Excision and Wooli featuring Valerie Broussard)	2023	—	28	—	—	—	—	—	—	—	—		Non-album singles
"Not Even Love" (with Seven Lions featuring Ásdís)	2024	—	14	—	2	—	—	—	—	—	—		Non-album singles
"In My Arms" (with Hayla)	2025	—	12	—	1	—	—	—	—	—	—		Odyssey
"Refuge" (with Norma Jean Martine)	2025	—	11	—	—	—	—	—	—	—	—		Odyssey
"Ur Alive" (with Wylde)	2025	—	—	—	—	—	—	—	—	—	—		Odyssey
"Still Breathing" (with Faouzia and G.E.M.)	2025	—	—	—	—	—	—	—	—	—	—		Non-album single
"Forever" (with Tom Grennan and Alna)	2025	—	6	—	1	—	—	—	—	— (Note: "Forever" did not enter the NZ Top 40 Singles Chart, but peaked at number 32 on the NZ Hot Singles Chart.)	—		Odyssey
"To The Moon" (with Alok)	2025	—	22	—	—	—	—	—	—	—	—		Odyssey
"With Your Love" (featuring Ryan Tedder)	2025	—	—	—	—	—	—	—	—	—	—		Odyssey
"Got Away" (with Subtronics featuring Royal & The Serpent)	2025	—	24	—	—	—	—	—	—	—	—		Fibonacci
"War" (featuring Lø Spirit)	2025	—	—	—	—	—	—	—	—	—	—		Odyssey
"Feel Alive" (with Dabin and Bastille)	2026	—	17	—	—	—	—	—	—	—	—		Odyssey
"Die Living" (with David Guetta and Dustin Lynch)	2026	—	9	—	—	—	—	—	—	— (Note: "Die Living" did not enter the NZ Top 40 Singles Chart, but peaked at number 31 on the NZ Hot Singles Chart.)	—		Non-album singles
"When The Light Breaks" (with Said The Sky and Heather Sommer)	2026	—	—	—	—	—	—	—	—	—	—		Non-album singles
"Close My Eyes" (with Marshmello and Sacha)	2026	—	—	—	—	—	—	—	—	—	—		Non-album singles
"—" denotes a recording that did not chart or was not released.

== Other charted songs ==
List of other charted songs, with selected chart positions, showing year released and album name
Title	Year	Peak chart positions				Certifications	Album
Title	Year	US Dance	US Dance Air.	US Dance Digital	NZ Hot	Certifications	Album
"Beautiful Creatures" (featuring MAX)	2017	32	—	13	—		Awake
"Hold On" (featuring Georgia Ku)	2019	17	—	16	—		Ascend
"That's Why" (featuring Goldn)	2019	25	—	—	—		Ascend
"All Together" (featuring Oeklin)	2019	41	—	—	—		Ascend
"Broken Ones" (featuring Anna Clendening)	2019	50	—	—	—		Ascend
"Sad Songs" (with Said the Sky featuring Annika Wells)	2019	48	—	—	—		Ascend
"In Your Arms" (with X Ambassadors)	2019	15	—	9	30	RIAA: Gold	Ascend
"Lonely" (featuring Chandler Leighton)	2019	46	—	—	—		Ascend
"Blame Myself" (featuring Tori Kelly)	2021	8	—	—	—		Fallen Embers
"Fragments" (featuring Natalie Taylor)	2021	20	—	—	—		Fallen Embers
"U & Me" (featuring Sasha Alex Sloan)	2021	18	—	—	—		Fallen Embers
"Lay It Down" (featuring Slander & Krewella)	2021	19	—	—	—		Fallen Embers
"Losing Patience" (featuring nothing,nowhere.)	2021	27	—	—	—		Fallen Embers
"In My Mind" (with Excision & Haliene)	2021	22	—	—	—		Fallen Embers
"Crazy Times" (featuring Said The Sky & Rock Mafia)	2021	30	—	—	—		Fallen Embers
"Brave Soul" (featuring Emma Grace)	2021	26	—	—	—		Fallen Embers
"Starfall"	2023	28	—	—	—		Illenium
"Lifeline" (with Jxdn)	2023	20	—	—	—		Illenium
"You Were Right" (with Wooli and Grabbitz)	2023	26	—	—	—		Illenium
"Drwn"	2023	45	—	—	—		Illenium
"Other Side" (with Said the Sky and Vera Blue)	2023	21	1	—	—		Illenium
"I Want You 2 (Stay)"	2023	44	—	—	—		Illenium
"Back to You" (with All Time Low)	2023	17	—	—	—		Illenium
"Nothing Ever After" (with Motionless in White)	2023	15	—	—	—		Illenium
"Don't Want Your Love" (with Ellie Goulding)	2026	9	1	—	30		Odyssey
"Slave to the Rithm" (with Bring Me the Horizon)	2026	18	—	—	—		Odyssey

== Remixes ==
Title	Year	Original artist(s)	Album
"Over the Love" (Note: At that time Illenium was formed by Nick Miller and Rob Finn.)	2013	Florence and the Machine	Non-album remixes
"Flipside"	2014	Lana Del Rey	Non-album remixes
"Run" (with Said The Sky)	2014	Secoya	Run
"Given The Chance"	2014	The Kite String Tangle	Non-album remixes
"Shark"	2014	Oh Wonder	Non-album remixes
"Always This Late"	2014	Odesza	Non-album remixes
"All I Want"	2015	Dawn Golden	Non-album remixes
"Mine"	2015	Phoebe Ryan	Non-album remixes
"Tonight We're Kids Again"	2015	Dada Life	Non-album remixes
"Falling" (with Said The Sky)	2015	Enkidu	Non-album remixes
"Gold Dust"	2015	Galantis	Non-album remixes
"Operate"	2015	Kill Paris featuring Imad Royal	Non-album remixes
"Disarm You"	2015	Kaskade featuring Ilsey	Non-album remixes
"Infinity"	2015	Niykee Heaton	Non-album remixes
"Don't Let Me Down"	2016	The Chainsmokers featuring Daya	Don't Let Me Down (Remixes) - EP
"Say It"	2016	Flume featuring Tove Lo	Skin: The Remixes
"Silence"	2017	Marshmello featuring Khalid	Non-album remixes
"Without Me"	2018	Halsey	Non-album remixes
"The Adventure"	2018	Angels & Airwaves	Non-album remixes
"Blame Myself" (with Virtual Riot)	2021	Illenium and Tori Kelly	Fallen Embers (Deluxe Version)
"Something In The Way"	2022	Nirvana	Non-album remixes
"Golden Hour" (with Nurko)	2022	JVKE	Non-album remixes
"Anti-Hero"	2022	Taylor Swift	Non-album remixes
"Zombie" (with Excision and Wooli featuring Valerie Broussard)	2023	The Cranberries	Non-album remixes

== Music videos ==
List of music videos, showing year released, director(s) and album
Title	Year	Director(s)	Album	Link
"Feel Good" (with Gryffin featuring Daya)	2017	Eric Kaufman and Austin Kelly	Awake	
"Crawl Outta Love" (featuring Annika Wells)	2018	Onur Senturk	Awake	
"Pray" (featuring Kameron Alexander)	2019	Joshua Lipworth	Ascend	
"Crashing" (featuring Bahari)	2019	Joshua Lipworth	Ascend	
"Good Things Fall Apart" (with Jon Bellion)	2019	Jeremi Durand	Ascend	
"Takeaway" (with The Chainsmokers featuring Lennon Stella)	2019	Jeremiah Davis	Ascend and World War Joy	
"Hard To Say Goodbye" (with Ekali featuring Chloe Angelides)	2020	Jacob Crawford	A World Away	
"Nightlight"	2020	Najeeb Tarazi	Fallen Embers	
"Paper Thin" (with Tom DeLonge and Angels & Airwaves)	2020	Kyle Cogan	Fallen Embers	
"Hearts on Fire" (with Dabin featuring Lights)	2021	Caleb Mallery	Fallen Embers	
"Don't Want Your Love" (featuring Ellie Goulding)	2026	Baby	Odyssey	
