= Fallen Embers (album) =

Studio album by Illenium
- Released: July 15, 2021
- Recorded: 2020–2021
- Genre: EDM; future bass; electropop; melodic dubstep; electronic rock; folktronica; emo rap
- Length: 54:23
- Label: Warner
- Producer: Stephen Aiello; Trevor Christensen; Jayson DeZuzio; Krewella; Dabin Lee; Jack Leech; Nicholas Miller; Joe Mulherin; Rock Mafia

Illenium chronology
| Ascend (2019) | Fallen Embers (2021) | Illenium (2023) |

Singles from Fallen Embers
- 1. "Nightlight" Released: August 28, 2020; 2. "Paper Thin" Released: October 22, 2020; 3. "Hearts on Fire" Released: December 25, 2020; 4. "First Time" Released: March 11, 2021; 5. "Sideways" Released: May 6, 2021; 6. "Heavenly Side" Released: July 1, 2021

Fallen Embers is the fourth studio album by American DJ, music producer, and musician Illenium, released on July 15, 2021, through Warner Records.

== Critical reception ==
In a mixed to positive review, Neil Yeung gave the album three stars out of five, saying "the lack of big builds and huge drops aside, the LP is emotionally engaging, often soothing, and — if this was a live set — ideal for resting and catching one's breath."

It was also nominated for the Grammy Award for Best Electronic / Dance Album.

== Track listing ==
| No. | Title | Writer(s) | Producer(s) | Length |
|---|---|---|---|---|
| 1. | "Blame Myself" (with Tori Kelly) | Nicholas Miller; Emily Warren; Steve Booker | Miller | 3:50 |
| 2. | "Heavenly Side" (with Matt Maeson) | Miller; Maeson; Jayson DeZuzio; Steph Jones | Miller; DeZuzio | 3:59 |
| 3. | "Fragments" (with Natalie Taylor) | Alejandra Alberti; Gino Borri; Matt Zara; Natalie Howard; Miller; Jonathan Howard | Miller | 3:29 |
| 4. | "Sideways" (with Valerie Broussard & NURKO) | David Arkwright; Valerie Broussard; Jack Leech; Miller; Benjamin Samama | Leech; Miller | 4:11 |
| 5. | "First Time" (with Iann Dior) | Stephen Aiello; Jordan Lutes; Miller; Michael Olmo | Aiello; Miller | 2:45 |
| 6. | "U & Me" (with Sasha Alex Sloan) | Miller; Alexandra Yatchenko | Miller | 3:33 |
| 7. | "Nightlight" (with Annika Wells) | Miller; Wells | Miller | 3:42 |
| 8. | "Hearts on Fire" (with Dabin & Lights) | Miller; Dabin Lee; Lights Poxleitner-Bokan | Lee; Miller | 3:56 |
| 9. | "Lay It Down" (with Slander & Krewella) | Derek Andersen; Scott Land; Miller; Cody Tarpley; Jahan Yousaf; Yasmine Yousaf | Andersen; Land; Miller; J. Yousaf; Y. Yousaf | 4:24 |
| 10. | "Losing Patience" (with Nothing,Nowhere) | Miller; Joe Mulherin | Miller; Mulherin | 3:50 |
| 11. | "In My Mind" (with Excision & Haliene) | Jeff Abel; Miller; Jeff Abel; Valentijn Hoogwerf; Matthew Steeper; Kelly Sweet | Miller; Abel | 5:00 |
| 12. | "Paper Thin" (with Tom DeLonge & Angels & Airwaves) | Miller; DeLonge | Colin Dieden; DeLonge; Miller; Pete Nappi; Elijah Noll; Aaron Rubin | 3:17 |
| 13. | "Crazy Times" (with Said the Sky & Rock Mafia) | Antonina Armato; Trevor Christensen; Tim James; Miller | Armato; Christensen; James; Miller | 3:50 |
| 14. | "Brave Soul" (with Emma Grace) | Grace; Miller | Christensen; Grace; Miller | 4:37 |
| Total length: | | | | 54:23 |

== Charts ==
=== Weekly charts ===
Weekly chart performance for Fallen Embers
| Chart (2021) | Peak position |
|---|---|
| Australian Albums (ARIA) | 99 |
| Canadian Albums (Billboard) | 49 |
| US Billboard 200 | 49 |
| US Top Dance Albums (Billboard) | 1 |

=== Year-end charts ===
2021 year-end chart performance for Fallen Embers
| Chart (2021) | Position |
|---|---|
| US Top Dance/Electronic Albums (Billboard) | 25 |
