= List of Billboard number-one electronic albums of 2023 =

These are the albums that reached number one on the Billboard Dance/Electronic Albums chart in 2023.

== Chart history ==
Key
†	Indicates best-performing album of 2023

List of number-one albums
Issue date	Album	Artist	Reference
January 7	Renaissance †	Beyoncé	
January 14	Renaissance †	Beyoncé	
January 21	Renaissance †	Beyoncé	
January 28	Renaissance †	Beyoncé	
February 4	Renaissance †	Beyoncé	
February 11	Renaissance †	Beyoncé	
February 18	Renaissance †	Beyoncé	
February 25	Renaissance †	Beyoncé	
March 4	Renaissance †	Beyoncé	
March 11	Renaissance †	Beyoncé	
March 18	Renaissance †	Beyoncé	
March 25	Renaissance †	Beyoncé	
April 1	Renaissance †	Beyoncé	
April 8	Renaissance †	Beyoncé	
April 15	Renaissance †	Beyoncé	
April 22	Renaissance †	Beyoncé	
April 29	Renaissance †	Beyoncé	
May 6	Renaissance †	Beyoncé	
May 13	Illenium	Illenium	
May 20	Renaissance †	Beyoncé	
May 27	Random Access Memories	Daft Punk	
June 3	Renaissance †	Beyoncé	
June 10	Renaissance †	Beyoncé	
June 17	Renaissance †	Beyoncé	
June 24	Renaissance †	Beyoncé	
July 1	Renaissance †	Beyoncé	
July 8	Renaissance †	Beyoncé	
July 15	Renaissance †	Beyoncé	
July 22	Renaissance †	Beyoncé	
July 29	Renaissance †	Beyoncé	
August 5	Renaissance †	Beyoncé	
August 12	Renaissance †	Beyoncé	
August 19	Renaissance †	Beyoncé	
August 26	Renaissance †	Beyoncé	
September 2	Renaissance †	Beyoncé	
September 9	Renaissance †	Beyoncé	
September 16	Renaissance †	Beyoncé	
September 23	Renaissance †	Beyoncé	
September 30	Renaissance †	Beyoncé	
October 7	Tension	Kylie Minogue	
October 14	Renaissance †	Beyoncé	
October 21	Renaissance †	Beyoncé	
October 28	Something to Give Each Other	Troye Sivan	
November 4	Something to Give Each Other	Troye Sivan	
November 11	Renaissance †	Beyoncé	
November 18	Sugar Papi	Marshmello	
November 25	Renaissance †	Beyoncé	
December 2	Renaissance †	Beyoncé	
December 9	Renaissance †	Beyoncé	
December 16	Renaissance †	Beyoncé	
December 23	Renaissance †	Beyoncé	
December 30	Renaissance †	Beyoncé	
