= Annika Wells =

American singer-songwriter (born 1996)

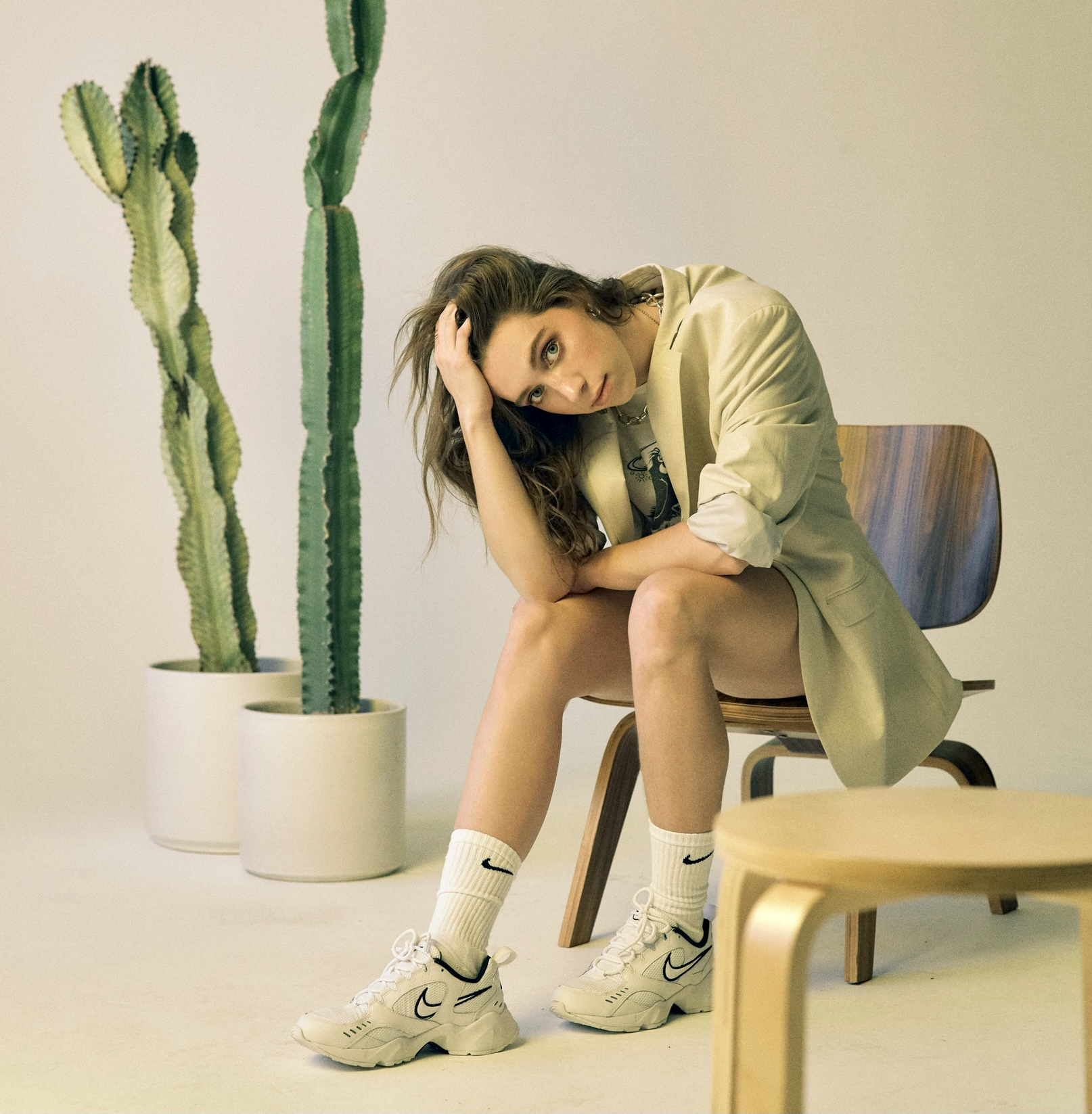

Background information
- Born: Annika Wells; February 16, 1996 (age 30); Los Angeles, U.S.
- Origin: Sleepy Hollow, Marin County, California
- Genres: Pop
- Occupation: Singer-Songwriter
- Instruments: Vocals, Piano, Guitar
- Member of: baby blue
- Website: annikawells.com

Annika Marie Wells (born February 16, 1996) is an American singer-songwriter from Sleepy Hollow, Marin County, California. After relocating to Los Angeles, Wells established herself as a prolific songwriter, collaborating with artists including BTS, the Jonas Brothers, Steve Aoki, PRETTYMUCH, ILLENIUM, Grey, Shawn Wasabi, Benjamin Ingrosso, The Chainsmokers, Hailee Steinfeld, Whethan, Emily Warren, Social House, Lennon Stella, Kennedi, Sabrina Carpenter, Tove Styrke, and Matoma, as well as songwriters Freddy Wexler and Jason Evigan. She has maintained ongoing creative partnerships with Maggie Lindemann and AJ Mitchell.

== Career ==
Shortly after moving to Los Angeles, Wells co-wrote ILLENIUM's 2017 single "Crawl Outta Love," which reached the top 30 on the Billboard Hot Dance/Electronic Songs chart and was awarded the grand prize at the International Songwriting Competition. In 2019, she joined ILLENIUM as a featured performer on his arena tour. Their continued collaboration produced "Nightlight," which reached No. 1 on Dance Radio in November 2020 and was nominated for a Grammy in 2022. Wells released her debut EP, EAT DIRT, in November 2023.

In 2025, Wells released several singles under her own name, including "what a time," "the good," and "converse," with the latter two serving as lead singles for her second EP. That October, JVKE launched a TikTok open verse challenge for his song "her"; after receiving thousands of submissions, Wells was announced as the winner on November 11, 2025, and was featured on the official release. An expanded version featuring Kaden Hawke followed on November 25, 2025. On January 29, 2026, Wells released her second EP, Into the Undergrowth, comprising seven tracks. She promoted the release with the Slumber Party Tour, a co-headlining run with Rachel Bochner supported by Lyncs, which is scheduled to visit cities across the United States in February and March 2026.

baby blue

In August 2025, Wells announced she would no longer release electronic music features as a solo artist, citing streaming algorithm challenges that limited her visibility due to the stylistic range of her catalog. Instead, she launched baby blue, an alternative electronic duo with her partner, producer James Quick. Between them, Wells and Quick have accumulated over two billion streams across platforms through their respective solo work and collaborations with artists such as BTS, the Jonas Brothers, Baynk, Tinashe, and ILLENIUM.

The duo debuted with the single "u + me" in August 2025, followed by "Monster," a collaboration with William Black released on Lost In Dreams Records. "Monster" is structured as a duet exploring themes of toxic relationships from dual perspectives. baby blue further expanded their catalog with two featured appearances on Said the Sky's acoustic album Salt & Silence (January 2026): "Let Me Fall," a track that shifts from bright vocals into darker tones, and "Wings," a contemplative piece centered on healing.

== Songwriting discography ==
Year	Artist(s)	Song	Album	Comment
2016	Annika Wells	"Break"	Break	
2017	ILLENIUM	"Crawl Outta Love"	Awake	No. 30 on Billboard Hot Dance/Electronic charts
2018	Liv Dawson	"Bedroom"	Bedroom EP	
2018	Tritonal, Lourdiz	"Love U Right"	Love U Right	
2018	Benjamin Ingrosso	"I Wouldn't Know"	Identification (Deluxe)	
2018	BTS, Steve Aoki	"The Truth Untold"	Love Yourself: Tear	
2019	Broods	"Everything Goes (Wow)"	Don't Feed The Pop Monster	
2019	BAYNK	"go with u"	Someone's EP II	Reached the No. 1 spot on New Zealand radio charts
2019	Sigma, Louisa	"Here We Go Again"	Here We Go Again	
2019	PRETTYMUCH	"Phases"	Phases - EP	
2019	ILLENIUM with Said the Sky & Annika Wells	"Sad Songs"	Ascend	No. 48 on Billboard Hot Dance/Electronic charts
2019	ILLENIUM with Anna Clendening	"Broken Ones"	Ascend	No. 50 on Billboard Hot Dance/Electronic charts
2019	Rose Villain	"Swoop!"	Swoop!	
2019	Eric Nam	"You're Sexy I'm Sexy"	Before We Begin	
2019	The Jonas Brothers	"Like It's Christmas"	Like It's Christmas	
2020	Grey	"For The Night"	For The Night	
2020	Midnight Kids with Annika Wells	"Run It"	Run It	
2020	SLANDER & William Black	"Back To U"	Back To U	
2020	Shawn Wasabi ft. Kennedi	"Lemons"	Lemons	
2020	Goody Grace	"Used to Be"	Used to Be	
2020	ILLENIUM & Annika Wells	"Nightlight"	Fallen Embers	No.1 on Dance Radio charts
2020	Stephanie Poetri	"Selfish"	AM:PM	
2020	Twice (Jihyo, Nayeon, Sana, and Chaeyoung), Bekuh Boom, and Annika Wells as K/DA Ahri	"I'll Show You"	All Out	
2021	Annika Wells	"Fuck Being Sober"	Fuck Being Sober	
2021	Maggie Lindemann	"Different"	Paranoia	
2021	Annika Wells	"Love Sucks"	Love Sucks	
2021	Annika Wells	"The Bitter End"	The Bitter End	
2021	Arty	"Take Your Time"	Take Your Time	
2021	Dabin & Trella	"Starbright"	Between Broken	
2022	Said The Sky, ILLENIUM & Chelsea Cutler	"Walk Me Home"	Sentiment	
2022	Annika Wells	"Modern Art"	Modern Art	
2022	gnash with Annika Wells	"granola bars"	granola bars	
2022	Annika Wells	"Stay High"	Stay High	
2023	ILLENIUM, Said The Sky & Vera Blue	"Other Side"	ILLENIUM	
2023	Annika Wells	"Crying Over You"	Crying Over You	
2023	Excision, Wooli & Codeko	"Don't Look Down (Hold On)"	Titans EP	
2023	Dabin & Trella	"Worlds Away"	Worlds Away	
2024	Kai Wachi & Trella	"Glow In The Dark"	Glow In The Dark	
2024	Dabin, Said The Sky & Clara Mae	"In The End"	In The End	
2024	HALIENE	"Memory Of You"	Memory Of You	
2025	Annika Wells	"what a time"	what a time - Single	
2025	Annika Wells	"the good"	Into the Undergrowth	
2025	Annika Wells	"converse"	Into the Undergrowth	
2025	JVKE feat. Annika Wells	"her"		TikTok open verse challenge winner
2025	JVKE feat. Annika Wells & Kaden Hawke	"her"		
2025	baby blue	"u + me"		Debut single as baby blue
2025	William Black & baby blue	"Monster"		Lost In Dreams Records
2026	Annika Wells	"carrot cake"	Into the Undergrowth	
2026	Annika Wells	"atom bomb"	Into the Undergrowth	
2026	Annika Wells	"into the undergrowth"	Into the Undergrowth	Title track
2026	Said the Sky feat. baby blue	"Let Me Fall"	Salt & Silence	
2026	Said the Sky feat. baby blue	"Wings"	Salt & Silence	
2026	Annika Wells	"bathwater"		
