= Jeff D'Agostino =

American actor and musician

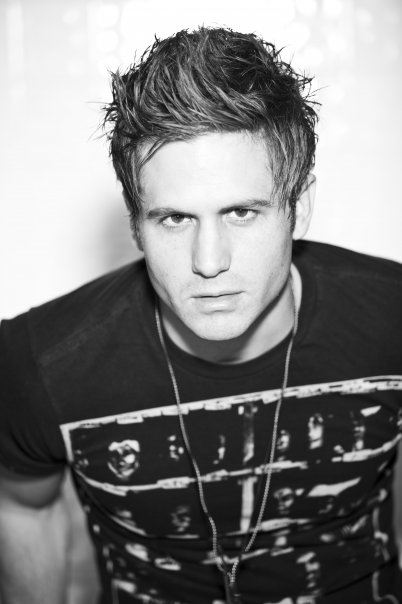

Background information
- Also known as: Oekiin
- Born: Jeffery Frank D'Agostino; September 5, 1982 (age 44); Fort Collins, Colorado, U.S.
- Genres: Electronic Rock, EDM, dubstep
- Occupations: Actor; singer; songwriter; musician
- Instruments: Vocals; guitar; electronic music production
- Years active: 2002–present (acting); 2011-present (musician)
- Labels: Interscope Records, Rock Mafia, Dilemma Music Inc.
- Website: http://www.oekiin.com

Jeff D'Agostino is an American actor, singer, songwriter, and musician; professionally known as the recording artist Oekiin (stylized as OEKIIN; pronounced "owaken" or "awaken"). After becoming an established TV and film actor, D'Agostino began a career in music. He signed to Rock Mafia Records in 2011, and was signed to Interscope Records by co-founder and former Chairman/C.E.O Jimmy Iovine in 2012. He has collaborated on songs with artist/producer Timbaland and DJ/producer Illenium.

== Early life ==
Born and raised in Fort Collins, Colorado, USA, D'Agostino started singing, acting, and performing in theater when he was eight years old. While taking local acting classes, a visiting talent agent from Los Angeles offered him representation. At age thirteen, he landed the lead role in the television pilot, Skwids. He moved to Los Angeles to pursue acting full-time at seventeen.

== Acting career ==
=== Television ===
D'Agostino has appeared in commercials and television shows including CSI, Weeds, CSI: Miami, Veronica Mars, Malcolm in the Middle, Without a Trace, Good Morning, Miami, JAG, Judging Amy, Phil of the Future, MDs, The Brothers Garcia, and Medical Investigation. Other television shows include Ghost House Pictures series Zombie Roadkill with Thomas Haden Church, ABC TV movie: The Wonderful World of Disney, and DreamWorks Television Pilot Hench at Home (2003) directed by Michael J. Fox. He was recognized for his standout performance as a series regular on David E. Kelley's The Brotherhood of Poland, New Hampshire (CBS) with co-stars Randy Quaid, Elizabeth McGovern, John Carroll Lynch, Ann Cusack, and Chris Penn.

=== Film ===
D'Agostino landed his first lead role in a feature film in 2002, playing the character Joshua "Toast" in Mary-Kate and Ashlee Olsen's Getting There. Other feature films include When Do We Eat? starring Ben Feldman (Mad Men, Silicon Valley,) Pound of Flesh with Malcolm McDowell, The Sasquatch Gang (2006) by the creators of the cult classic film Napoleon Dynamite with cast mates Justin Long, Joey Kern, and Jon Heder, and indie-horror film Underground (2011) with co-stars Christine Evangelista and Sofia Pernas.

== Music career ==
D'Agostino began writing songs as a hobby and was eventually discovered by Rock Mafia Records' Co-founder and record producer Tim James. Before working with Rock Mafia, D'Agostino was the lead singer of a pop-punk rock band. His bandmates included Jake Pitts, lead guitarist of Black Veil Brides. They toured regionally and were offered a record deal at Stand and Deliver Records. The band broke up before signing.

=== 2010–2011: Rock Mafia Records deal ===
D'Agostino wrote new material for a solo project and signed a production deal with Rock Mafia Records, Tim James, Antonina Armato, and Paul Palmer (co-founder, Trauma Records). After recording at Rock Mafia Studios in Santa Monica, CA, D'Agostino formed the live band with several friends. They toured the West Coast and built a strong fan base. Their music was a mix of rock, electronic, and hip hop.

=== 2012–2017: Interscope Records deal ===
Rock Mafia Records presented D'Agostino's music to Interscope-Geffen-A&M Chairman/CEO Jimmy Iovine. Timbaland accompanied Iovine to the meeting and loved what he heard. He asked to be featured on a song with D'Agostino, which he later recorded. After the meeting, Iovine offered D'Agostino a deal with Interscope Records. D'Agostino signed and recorded one album with the company. Timbaland and Jimmy Iovine left their roles at Interscope and the album was never released. The deal was terminated in 2017.

=== 2018–present: Oekiin, song "All Together" with DJ/EDM producer Illenium ===
D'Agostino then wrote and recorded new songs independently, which allowed him to maintain creative control and ownership of his recordings. He re-branded his artist name as Oekiin and showed Tim James at Rock Mafia his new project. James then played one of Oekiin's songs to EDM DJ/Producer Illenium (Nicholas D. Miller), whom he was working with at the time. Illenium loved Oekiin's song "All Together," and asked to add some production to the track.

Oekiin's song "All Together" was released August 16, 2019 on Illenium's third album, "Ascend," distributed by label Astralwerks/Capitol Records/Universal Music Group. "All Together" reached #41 on Billboard's Hot Dance/Electronic chart, and the album "Ascend" hit #1 on Billboard's Top Dance/Electronic albums.

Oekiin's EPs New Design and Rebel Minds are scheduled to be released in the summer of 2019 through his personal label, Dilemma Music Inc. Oekiin's music is a mix of electronic rock, dubstep, and EDM.

== Filmography ==
=== Film ===
Title	Year	Role	Notes
I Am Borderline	2016	Jeff	Short film
Searching for Katie	2014	Jeff Daniels	Feature film
Underground	2011	Eric Abercrombie	Feature film
Potter's Field	2010	Daryl Hexler	Short film
Pound of Flesh]	2010	Tom	Feature film
The Sasquatch Gang	2006	Dagan	Feature film
When Do We Eat?	2005	Shaffer	Feature film
Getting There	2002	Joshua “Toast”	Feature film

=== Television ===
Title	Year	Role	Network	Notes
Destroy the Alpha Gammas	2013	Scott	YouTube	YouTube series
Zombie Roadkill	2010	Nate	FEARnet	Series regular 6 episodes
Private High Musical	2008	Shoe	MTV, YouTube	YouTube series, MTV series pilot
CSI: Crime Scene Investigation	2005	Gerald 'Blinky' Allison	CBS	Episode "Room Service"
Weeds	2005	Bobby	HBO	Episode "Higher Education"
Veronica Mars	2005	Tad Wilson	The CW	Episode "M.A.D."
Phil of the Future	2005	Myron	Disney Channel	2 episodes
Medical Investigation	2004	Randy	NBC	Episode "Little Girl"
JAG	2004	Chris	CBS	Episode "Take It Like a Man"
Hench at Home	2003	Richie Previtt	ABC	DreamWorks TV series pilot
The Brotherhood of Poland, New Hampshire	2003	Malcom Shaw	CBS	Series regular 4 episodes
Good Morning, Miami	2003	Ty	NBC	Episode "I Second That Promotion"
The Brothers Garcia	2003	Dalton	Nickelodeon	Episode Sisters Garcia: Part 2
Judging Amy	2003	Andrew Lanteri	CBS	Episode Shock and Awe
Without a Trace	2003	Calvin Fuller	CBS	Episode "Victory for Humanity"
CSI: Miami	2002	Timmy Diehl	CBS	Episode "Camp Fear"
The Wonderful World of Disney	2002	Heavy Metal Kid	ABC	TV movie Nancy Drew
Malcolm in the Middle	2002	Student #5	FOX	Episode "Humilithon"
MDs	2002	Frat Boy	ABC	Episode R.I.P.
