= Fallen Embers =

Fallen Embers may refer to:

- "Fallen Embers" (Enya song), from the album A Day Without Rain
- Fallen Embers (album), by Illenium
