= Ascend (Illenium album) =

Studio album by Illenium
- Released: August 16, 2019
- Recorded: 2018–2019
- Genre: Future bass; rock; dance-pop; pop; dubstep
- Length: 1:00:16
- Label: Astralwerks
- Producer: Illenium; Rock Mafia; Jason Evigan; FRND; Foy Vance; Jonny Coffer; Devrim Karaoglu; John Silos; The Chainsmokers; Freedo; Erin McCarley; Jordan Stilwell; Said the Sky; Matias Mora; The Monsters and the Strangerz; Sandy Vee

Illenium chronology
| Awake (2017) | Ascend (2019) | Fallen Embers (2021) |

Singles from Ascend
- 1. "Take You Down" Released: August 3, 2018; 2. "Crashing" Released: January 25, 2019; 3. "Pray" Released: March 22, 2019; 4. "Good Things Fall Apart" Released: May 13, 2019; 5. "Takeaway" Released: July 24, 2019; 6. "Blood" Released: August 2, 2019

Ascend (stylized in all caps) is the third studio album by American DJ and music producer Illenium, released on August 16, 2019, through Astralwerks, making it his major-label debut and his only album on the label. The album features six singles.

== Background ==
Consisting of 17 songs, the album includes six previously released singles, "Take You Down", "Crashing", "Pray", "Good Things Fall Apart", "Takeaway", and "Blood". On his social media accounts, he announced the release date of the album and the following tour on June 12.

== Promotion ==
- The first single "Take You Down" was released on August 3, 2018. The song brought forth the drug abuse problem Illenium previously had.
- The second single "Crashing", featuring Bahari, was released on January 25, 2019.
- The third single "Pray", featuring Kameron Alexander, was released on March 22, 2019.
- The fourth single "Good Things Fall Apart", with Jon Bellion, was released on May 13, 2019.
- The fifth single "Takeaway", with The Chainsmokers and featuring Lennon Stella, was released on July 24, 2019.
- The sixth and last single before the album release "Blood", with Foy Vance, was released on August 2, 2019.

== Critical reception ==
Professional ratings
Review scores
| Source | Rating |
|---|---|
| PopMatters | 6/10 |

=== Accolades ===
Year-end Lists
| Publication | List | Rank | Ref. |
|---|---|---|---|
| Dance Music Northwest | Best Electronic Music Albums of 2019 | 1 | |
| The Nocturnal Times | Top Electronic/Dance Albums of 2019 | 9 | |
| Your EDM | Top 10 Albums of 2019 | 5 | |

Awards
| Year | Ceremony | Category | Result | Ref. |
|---|---|---|---|---|
| 2020 | Billboard Music Awards | Top Dance/Electronic Album | Nominated | |
| 2020 | International Dance Music Awards | Best Album | Nominated | |

== Track listing ==
| No. | Title | Writer(s) | Producer(s) | Length |
|---|---|---|---|---|
| 1. | "I Care (Intro)" | Nicholas Miller | Illenium | 0:33 |
| 2. | "Hold On" (with Georgia Ku) | Miller; Georgia Overton; Andrew Goldstein | Illenium; FRND | 3:55 |
| 3. | "Good Things Fall Apart" (with Jon Bellion) | Miller; James Abrahart; Sarah Hudson; Jason Evigan; Jonathan Bellion | Illenium; Evigan | 3:36 |
| 4. | "That's Why" (with Joshua Golden) | Miller; Tim James Price; Antonina Armato; Simon Rosen | Illenium; Rock Mafia | 4:12 |
| 5. | "Blood" (with Foy Vance) | Miller; Jonathan Coffer; Foy Vance; Johnny McDaid; Amy Wadge; Eamon Murray; Niamh Dunne; Liam Bradley; Damian McKee; Sean Graham | Illenium; Vance^{[c]}; Jonny Coffer^{[c]} | 4:08 |
| 6. | "Take You Down" | Miller; Price; A. Armato | Illenium; Rock Mafia | 3:41 |
| 7. | "All Together" (with Oekiin) | Miller; Devrim Karaoglu; Price; A. Armato; Jeff D'Agostino | Illenium; Rock Mafia; Karagolu | 3:58 |
| 8. | "Crashing" (featuring Bahari) | Miller; Julia Michaels; Justin Tranter; Price; A. Armato; Elio Armato | Illenium; Rock Mafia | 3:50 |
| 9. | "Broken Ones" (with Anna Clendening) | Miller; Annika Wells | Illenium | 3:18 |
| 10. | "Every Piece of Me" (with Echos) | Miller; John Silos; Alexandra Norton; Tal Richards; Charlie Snyder | Illenium; Silos^{[b]} | 3:43 |
| 11. | "Takeaway" (with The Chainsmokers featuring Lennon Stella) | Miller; Andrew Taggart; Alexander Pall; Fridolin Walcher; Sorana Păcurar; Samuel John Gray; Jonas Becker; Timofei Crudu; Christoph "Shuko" Bauss | The Chainsmokers; Illenium; Freedo^{[a]}; Erin McCarley^{[c]}; Jordan Stilwell^{[c]} | 3:29 |
| 12. | "Sad Songs" (with Said the Sky featuring Annika Wells) | Miller; Trevor Christensen; Wells | Illenium; Said the Sky | 3:30 |
| 13. | "Pray" (featuring Kameron Alexander) | Miller; Fransisca Hall; Matias Mora; Kameron Alexander | Illenium; Mora^{[c]} | 4:55 |
| 14. | "In Your Arms" (with X Ambassadors) | Miller; Samuel Martin; Evigan; Stefan Johnson; Jordan Johnson; Alexander Izquerdio; Samuel Nelson Harris | Illenium; Evigan; The Monsters and the Strangerz | 3:40 |
| 15. | "Gorgeous" (with Blanke featuring Bipolar Sunshine) | Miller; Sandy Wilhelm; Price; A. Armato; Adio Marchant; John-Paul Orchison | Illenium; Blanke; Rock Mafia; Sandy Vee | 4:37 |
| 16. | "Angel (Lonely Prelude)" | Miller | Illenium | 0:41 |
| 17. | "Lonely" (featuring Chandler Leighton) | Miller; Jaymes McFarland; Chandler Leighton | Illenium | 4:30 |
| Total length: | | | | 60:16 |

Notes

- ^{^[a]} signifies a co-producer
- ^{^[b]} signifies an additional producer
- ^{^[c]} signifies a vocal producer

== Charts ==
=== Weekly charts ===
| Chart (2019) | Peak position |
|---|---|
| Australian Albums (ARIA) | 54 |
| Canadian Albums (Billboard) | 12 |
| Swiss Albums (Schweizer Hitparade) | 76 |
| US Billboard 200 | 14 |
| US Top Dance Albums (Billboard) | 1 |

=== Year-end charts ===
| Chart (2019) | Position |
|---|---|
| US Top Dance/Electronic Albums (Billboard) | 18 |
| Chart (2020) | Position |
| US Top Dance/Electronic Albums (Billboard) | 8 |

== Certifications ==
| Region | Certification | Certified units/sales |
|---|---|---|
| United States (RIAA) | Gold | 500,000^{‡} |
^{‡} Sales+streaming figures based on certification alone.

== Release history ==
Release dates and formats for Ascend
| Region | Date | Format(s) | Label(s) | Ref. |
|---|---|---|---|---|
| Various | August 16, 2019 | CD; LP; digital download; streaming | Astralwerks | |
