= Crashing (Illenium song) =

2019 song by Illenium and Bahari

Single by Illenium featuring Bahari

from the album Ascend
- Released: January 25, 2019
- Genre: Crossover-pop
- Length: 3:50
- Label: Astralwerks
- Songwriters: Nicholas Miller; Julia Michaels; Justin Tranter; Timothy James Price; Antonina Armato; Elio Armato
- Producers: Illenium; Rock Mafia

Illenium singles chronology
"God Damnit" (2018)	"Crashing" (2019)	"Pray" (2019)

Bahari singles chronology
"Chasers" (2018)	"Crashing" (2019)	"Sad Face" (2019)

Music video
- "Crashing" on YouTube

"Crashing" is a song by American DJ and producer Illenium featuring American musical duo Bahari. It was released on January 25, 2019, as the second single from Illenium's third studio album Ascend.

== Background ==
According to a press release, Illenium said: "I really love how this song turned out, I heard the demo a long time ago, and it always really stuck with me. We started working together a few months later, and they played the idea for me again. I was really stoked I was able to be a part of the record with such amazing people. Working on the song felt natural, and I couldn't have asked for a better duo to work with on it."

And Bahari said in a joint statement: "This song is so close to our hearts. It's been one of our favorite songs we've ever made, and we have been waiting for the perfect time to put it out. Illenium really captured the emotion of what we were trying to portray with the lyrics. We couldn't have dreamed of a better collaboration for this song."

== Composition ==
According to River Beats Dance, the song featured "an upbeat melody, some easy on the ear synths, smooth production, and dreamy vocals".

== Music video ==
The music video for "Crashing" was released on April 18, 2019. Serving as a continuation of the "Pray" video, which focused on a car crash in the forest, the video shows the people involved in the crash intercut with Bahari singing near the crime scene.

== Charts ==
=== Weekly charts ===
Weekly chart performance for "Crashing"
Chart (2019)	Peak position
US Hot Dance/Electronic Songs (Billboard)	20

=== Year-end charts ===
Year-end chart performance for "Crashing"
Chart (2019)	Position
US Hot Dance/Electronic Songs (Billboard)	99
