= Swoop! =

Italian song (2019)

"SWOOP!"

Single by Rose Villain
- Released: 26 July 2019
- Genre: Hip hop
- Length: 3:09
- Label: Republic
- Songwriters: Rosa Luini; Annika Wells; Sidney Swift; Andrea Ferrara; Stephen Gibson; Cecil Glenn
- Producers: @iamchillpill; Sixpm

Rose Villain singles chronology
"Funeral Party" (2018)	"SWOOP!" (2019)	"Kanye Loves Kanye" (2019)

Music video
- "SWOOP!" on YouTube

"SWOOP!" is a song co-written and recorded by Italian rapper Rose Villain. The song was released on July 26, 2019, via Republic Records. The song served as her second and last single under the label, following her signing announced in March 2018. The song samples "Whoomp! (There It Is)" of the Tag Team.
