= In Your Arms (Illenium and X Ambassadors song) =

- Stripped version cover

Song by Illenium and X Ambassadors

from the album Ascend
- Released: August 16, 2019
- Genre: Future bass
- Length: 3:40
- Label: Astralwerks
- Songwriter(s): Jason Evigan; Alexander Izquierdo; Jordan Johnson; Nicholas Miller; Sam Harris; Sam Martin; Stefan Johnson
- Producer(s): Illenium; Jason Evigan; The Monsters & Strangerz

"In Your Arms" is a song by American DJ and producer Illenium and American rock band X Ambassadors. It was released on August 16, 2019, from his third studio album Ascend.

== Content ==
The song’s described a person whom the singer loves and believes is his soul mate. Even through life’s inevitable hardships, the singer knows the two will stick together.

== Live performance ==
Illenium and Sam Harris of X Ambassadors performed "In Your Arms" original version during Ascend Tour at famed LA arena Staples Center back in December 2019.

== Other versions ==
On May 1, 2020, Illenium and X Ambassadors shared "In Your Arms" Stripped version.

Norwegian music producer Alan Walker remixed the song.

== Charts ==
=== Weekly charts ===
Chart (2019–2020)	Peak position
New Zealand Hot Singles (RMNZ)	30
US Hot Dance/Electronic Songs (Billboard)	15

=== Year-end charts ===
Chart (2019)	Position
US Hot Dance/Electronic Songs (Billboard)	72
Chart (2020)	Position
US Hot Dance/Electronic Songs (Billboard)	65
