= Evan Giia =

American singer

EVAN GIIA
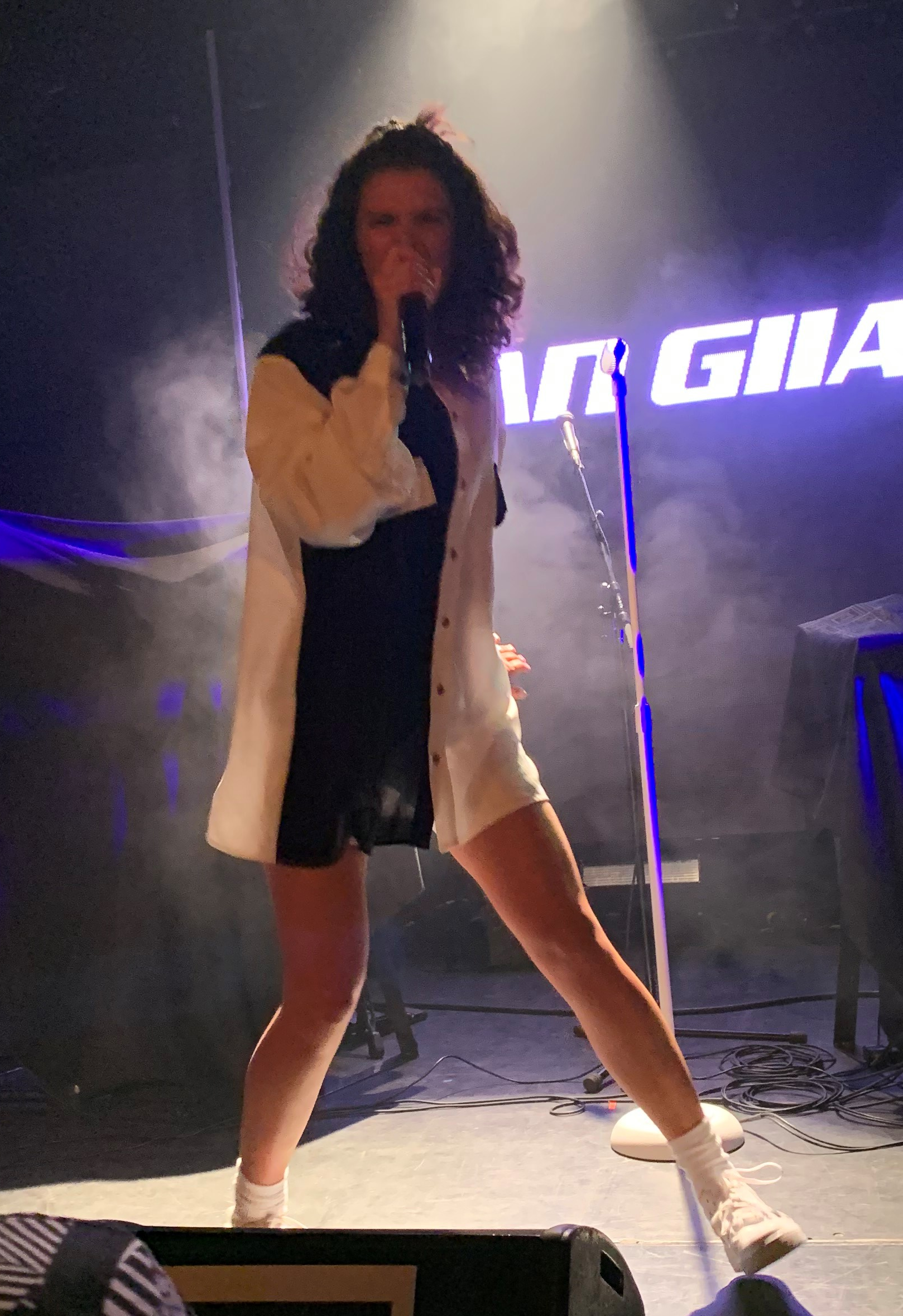
- Evan GIIA performing in 2019

Background information
- Born: Evan Giarrusso
- Genres: Electropop; EDM; future bass
- Occupation: Singer
- Years active: 2016–present
- Website: www.evangiia.com

Evan Giarrusso, better known as EVAN GIIA, is an American singer. Her first notable song was "Heat of The Moment" with music duo MEMBA, which was selected as the singles of the week by BBC Radio 1 in 2016. In September 2022, GIIA's Don't Let Me Let Go ( with Dillion Francis and Illenium) secured the number one position on US Dance Radio.

== Career ==
EVAN GIIA grew up up in Hingham, Massachusetts. She is an alumna of Berklee College of Music and trained in opera singing. Her first single was "Heat of the Moment" in 2016. Her second single, "Brave" was listed by as the top single by Hype Machine in 2017. In 2018, she dropped "Westworld", one of her most popular songs. In 2019, GIIA partnered with New York based duo MEMBA in their EP Saga-II, where she was the vocalist of the song "Walls Down". In November of the same year, her single "Sidelines" was released. In February 2020, she dropped the single "Switch Off". In April 2020, her single "Focus" was released for which she also was the songwriter. In October 2020, GIIA teamed with Gorgon City in their single "Burning", which was premiered by Billboard Dance. The song reached Billboard Dance Chart's position 7 and was two weeks in the peak. In the same month, she also launched her solo, "tiny life". In the end of 2020, she attended numerous concerts with music duo Odesza. During early 2021, she did a US tour with MEMBA. GIIA appeared in different music festivals like Elements Music Festival, Breakaway Music Festival etc.

== Discography ==
=== Extended plays ===
| Title | Details |
|---|---|
| ENDORPHINS | UMG Recordings, Inc. (August 6, 2021) |

=== Singles ===
==== As a lead artist ====
| Year | Title | Peak chart positions | Release Details |
| Year | Title | US Dance | Release Details |
|---|---|---|---|
| 2017 | "Exhale" | — | Elysian Records |
| 2017 | "Pull Up" (with MEMBA and TITUS) | — | Elysian Records |
| 2017 | "Stepping Stones" | — | KnightVision |
| 2017 | "Absolute Zero" | — | Self-Released |
| 2017 | "Crumble" (with VOLO) | — | Self-Released |
| 2018 | "DRIP" | — | Self-Released |
| 2018 | "WESTWORLD" | — | Foreign Family Collective |
| 2018 | "I DON'T LIKE UR FRIENDS" | — | Foreign Family Collective |
| 2019 | "WHAT U NEED?" | — | Foreign Family Collective |
| 2019 | "Walls Down" (with MEMBA) | — | Foreign Family Collective |
| 2019 | "For Aisha" (with MEMBA and Nooran Sisters) | — | ANTNNA |
| 2019 | "Encore" | — | UMG Recordings, Inc. |
| 2019 | "Sidelines" | — | UMG Recordings, Inc. |
| 2020 | "Switch Off" | — | UMG Recordings, Inc. |
| 2020 | "Focus" | — | UMG Recordings, Inc. |
| 2020 | "What's your temperature?" (with MEMBA) | — | ANTNNA |
| 2020 | "Burning" (with Gorgon City) | 7 | Universal Music Operations Limited |
| 2020 | "Focus (Acoustic)" | — | UMG Recordings, Inc. |
| 2020 | "tiny life" | — | UMG Recordings, Inc. |
| 2021 | "Stay Up" | — | UMG Recordings, Inc. |
| 2021 | "Mood Swings" | — | UMG Recordings, Inc. |
| 2021 | "In Motion" (with Memba featuring Reo Cragun) | — | UMG Recordings, Inc. |
| 2022 | "Blow The Roof" (with Louis the Child and Kasbo) | — | Interscope Records |
"—" denotes a recording that did not chart or was not released.

==== As featured artist ====
| Year | Title | Release details |
|---|---|---|
| 2016 | "Heat of the Moment" (MEMBA featuring EVAN GIIA and Hoosh) | Elysian Records |
| 2017 | "Brave" (MEMBA featuring Dakk and EVAN GIIA) | Elysian Records |
| 2017 | "Replay" (Brisk featuring EVAN GIIA) | Tribal Trap |
| 2019 | "MEMBA – For Aisha (Featured in "The Sky Is Pink") featuring EVAN GIIA & Nooran Sisters | |
| 2021 | "Pockets" (Devault featuring EVAN GIIA) | Ultra Records, LLC |
| 2021 | "Messin' Me Up" (What So Not featuring EVAN GIIA) | Sweat It Out! |
| 2022 | "Don't Let Me Let Go" (Dillon Francis and Illenium featuring EVAN GIIA) | Astralwerks |
