= Ashes (Illenium album) =

Studio album by Illenium
- Released: February 15, 2016
- Recorded: 2015–16
- Genre: Electronic; progressive house; future bass; dubstep; trap
- Length: 42:50
- Label: Kasaya; Seeking Blue
- Producer: Nicholas Miller; Myles Anderson; Patrick Megeath; Jacob Grant; Nathaniel Motte; Dave Audé; Anthony Howell

Illenium chronology
Ashes (2016)	Awake (2017)

Singles from Ashes
- 1. "Spirals" Released: May 17, 2015; 2. "I'll Be Your Reason" Released: June 15, 2015; 3. "Jester" Released: December 16, 2015 (promo); 4. "Afterlife" Released: February 15, 2016; 5. "Fortress" Released: February 15, 2016; 6. "Bring Forth the Pressure" Released: May 6, 2016 (promo)

Ashes is the debut studio album by American DJ, music producer, and musician Illenium, released on February 15, 2016. The album features six singles including two bonus tracks.

In an interview about the album, Illenium said, "I wanted to create something timeless. Music has this crazy way of coming into people’s lives and totally take their problems and struggles away for a moment. It lets people breathe and be in the moment while also taking them to a different reality. My hope is that this album does that and creates a bond with the listener and music forever."

== Singles ==
The first single "Spirals", a collaboration with Sound Remedy featuring King Deco, was released on May 17, 2015.

The second single "I'll Be Your Reason" was released on June 15, 2015.

The third single "Jester", a collaboration with Chilled Velvet, was released on December 16, 2015.

The fourth and fifth singles "Afterlife" featuring Echos and "Fortress" featuring Joni Fatora were released together with the album on February 15, 2016.

The sixth single "Bring Forth the Pressure", a collaboration with Dirt Monkey, was released on May 6, 2016.

== Reception ==
Alex Bruski of YourEDM.com stated "The album starts off calm, but powerful, featuring vocals from King Deco, with whom he has worked previously on the track “Spirals” that is also featured on the album. Overall I think the album is well put together with depth seemingly missing in a lot of electronic songs these days. The vocals clearly add a feeling of closeness and human connection. I hope this album reaches you in the way Nick intended when he created Ashes. This album takes me to a new world, I hope you can join me there!"

== Track listing ==
No.	Title	Length
1.	"Reverie" (featuring King Deco)	4:59
2.	"Fortress" (featuring Joni Fatora)	3:23
3.	"With You" (featuring Quinn XCII)	3:06
4.	"Sleepwalker" (featuring Joni Fatora)	4:10
5.	"It's All on U" (featuring Liam O'Donnell)	3:24
6.	"Spirals" (with Sound Remedy featuring King Deco)	6:01
7.	"Without You" (featuring SKYLR)	3:52
8.	"Only One" (featuring Nina Sung)	4:12
9.	"I'll Be Your Reason"	3:39
10.	"Afterlife" (featuring Echos)	6:04
11.	"Jester" (with Chilled Velvet) (bonus track)	3:01
12.	"Bring Forth the Pressure" (with Dirt Monkey) (bonus track)	2:45
Total length:		42:50/48:36

== Charts ==
Chart (2016)	Peak position
US Top Dance/Electronic Albums (Billboard)	6
US Heatseekers Albums (Billboard)	19
