= Kameron Alexander =

American singer/songwriter and producer

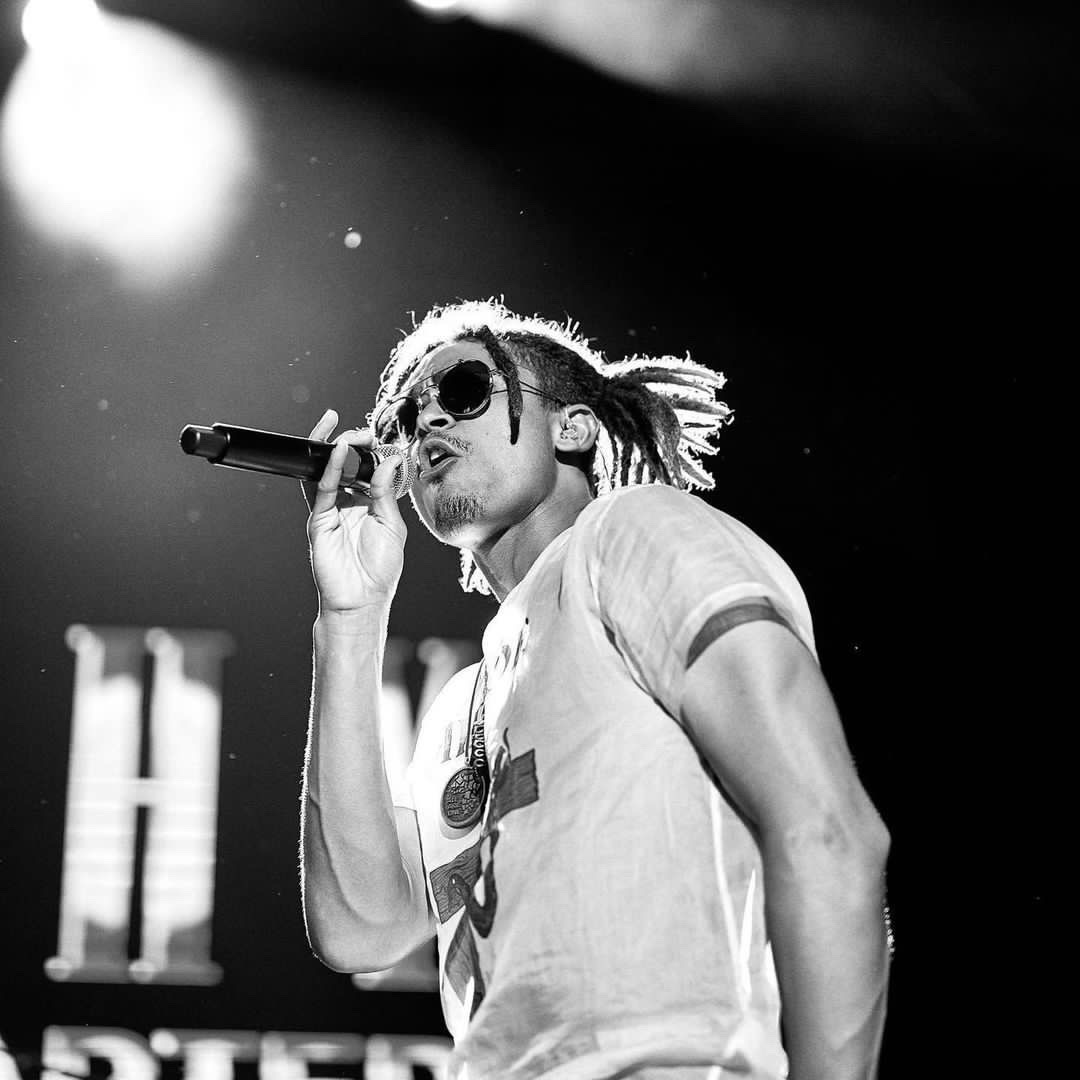
- Alexander in 2022

Background information
- Genres: Pop, R&B, soul, alternative pop, alternative hip hop, EDM, alternative rock, grunge
- Occupations: Artist, songwriter, singer, record producer, engineer, vocal producer
- Instruments: Vocalist, bass, keyboards, drum programming
- Years active: 2011–present
- Labels: Alexander Morris Group, LLC (AMG), Sony/ATV, Pick Six Records
- Website: @itskameron

Kameron Alexander is an American singer, songwriter, and record producer from Pasadena, California.

After graduating high school, Kameron went on to pursue audio engineering full-time at the Los Angeles Recording School, during which he also apprenticed under Grammy Award-winning singer, songwriter and record producer Raphael Saadiq. After spending a few years under his wing, Kameron went on to work at Larrabee Studios in North Hollywood; where, he would be mentored by world-class mixer Dave Pensado. After spending time learning from some of the best mixers and producers in the industry, Kameron began the approach of songwriting and production.

Since then, Kameron has signed a publishing deal with Sony/ATV and has worked with artists and producers such as Frank Ocean, Jacob Banks, Kelly Rowland, Little Big Town, Parson James, LP, Meghan Trainor, Malay Ho, Arlissa, No I.D., Illenium, Michael Bolton, J.R. Rotem, Frank E, A$AP Rocky, & Alan Walker, Marshmello, Alicia Keys, Kane Brown, Justin Bieber, Shy Carter, EXO, Normani, Ne-Yo, John Legend.

== Discography ==
=== Artist, writer and composer credits ===
Title	Album	Artist	Role	Single	Year
"Grand"	Different Man	Kane Brown	Writer	Yes	2022
"Nosebleed"	DISC TWO	Josh Levi	Writer/Producer	Yes	2022
"Don't They (Remix)"	DISC TWO	Josh Levi & Normani	Writer/Producer	Yes	2022
"Supernovacane"	Shockwave	Marshmello	Writer/Vocalist	Yes	2021
"Rizla"	For My Friends	Jacob Banks	Writer	Yes	2021
"Numb"	For My Friends	Jacob Banks	Writer	Yes	2021
"Healing"	Healing - Single	Arlissa	Writer/Producer	Yes	2021
"Don't They"	DISC ONE	Josh Levi	Writer/Producer	Yes	2020
"White Leather"	DISC ONE	Josh Levi	Writer/Producer	Yes	2020
"Seatbelt"	DISC ONE	Josh Levi	Writer/Producer	Yes	2020
"The Movies"	DISC ONE	Josh Levi	Writer/Producer	Yes	2020
"Drown"	Restoration	Lecrae	Background Vocalist	No	2020
"Minute"	Minute - Single	Parson James	Writer	Yes	2019
"All Night Long"	Fingerprint - EP	Ananya Birla	Writer	Yes	2019
"Wife That"	Make Shift	Marius	Writer/Artist	No	2019
"Live Fast"	Live Fast – (PUBGM)	Alan Walker & A$AP Rocky	Writer/Artist	Yes	2019
"Paint California"	Paint California - Single	Nombe	Writer	Yes	2019
"Good Thing"	Lucid	Asa Elemide	Writer/Composer	Yes	2019
"Before The Dawn"	Before The Dawn (Single)	ALPHA 9 feat. Kameron Alexander	Writer/Artist	Yes	2019
"Pray"	Ascend	Illenium feat. Kameron Alexander	Writer/Artist	Yes	2019
"Healer"	Healer - Single	JNR Williams feat. Theophilus London	Writer	Yes	2019
"Good Mornin'"	THE LOVE TRAIN	Meghan Trainor	Background Vocals	No	2019
"Dirty Money"	Dirty Money (Single)	Weathers (band)	Writer	Yes	2019
"Dream World Tour"	The First II	NEXT	Writer	Yes	2018
"Slow Up"	The Village	Jacob Banks	Writer/Composer	Yes	2018
"Know Rights"	TOXIC GARDN	TOXIC GARDN	Writer/Composer	No	2018
"Feed The Monster"	TOXIC GARDN	TOXIC GARDN	Writer/Composer	Yes	2018
"Chemical (Blue)"	Momentary	Demo Taped	Writer	Yes	2018
"Addiction"	Innocent/Addiction	PLYA	Writer	Yes	2018
"Innocent"	Innocent/Addiction	PLYA	Writer	Yes	2018
"Get Up and Dance"	Zombillennium (Original Soundtrack)	Mat Bastard feat. Kameron Alexander	Writer/Artist	No	2017
"Can't Get Enough"	N/A	V6	Writer	Yes	2017
"Beautiful War"	My Name is Earl EP	Earl St. Clair	Writer	No	2017
"Bad Love"	My Name is Earl EP	Earl St. Clair	Writer	Yes	2017
"Drivin' Around"	The Breaker	Little Big Town	Writer	No	2017
"Rhythm After Summer"	Hey Mama!	Exo (group)	Writer	No	2016
"Can't Bring Me Down"	Lotto – Ex'act repackaged album	Exo (group)	Writer	No	2016
"Waves"	Heart Miles	Jai Waetford	Writer	Yes	2016
"Stay"	Circus Avenue	Auryn	Writer	Yes	2014
"Want You"	Forward Movement Only	Demi Grace	Producer, writer	Yes	2014
"How You Want"	XOVER	MIHIRO	Writer	No	2013
"Can't Stay Away"	N/A	IM5	Writer	Yes	2013

=== Technical credits ===
Title	Album	Artist	Role	Single
"Swim Good"	nostalgia, ULTRA	Frank Ocean	Recording & Mix engineer	Yes

=== Chart performance ===
"Grand" – Kane Brown (single from album Different Man )

Chart	Peak position
US Pop Airplay (Billboard)	23

"Pray" – Illenium feat. Kameron Alexander (single from album Ascend )

Chart	Peak position
US Dance/Electronic Digital Songs (Billboard)	8
Top Dance/Electronic Albums (Billboard)	1

LOTTO – Repackaged album (Korean and Chinese versions)

Chart	Peak position	
Chart	Korean version	Chinese version
South Korean Albums (Gaon)	1	2
Japanese Albums (Oricon)	8	16

Combined versions

Chart	Peak position
US World Albums (Billboard)	2
