= Gold (Stupid Love) =

Single by Excision and Illenium featuring Shallows

from the album Apex
- Released: 17 July 2018
- Recorded: 2018
- Genre: Melodic dubstep
- Length: 4:55
- Label: Excision Music; Caption Records
- Songwriter: Shallows
- Producers: Jeff Abel; Nicholas Miller

Excision singles chronology
"Rumble" (2018)	"Gold (Stupid Love)" (2018)	"Another Me" (2019)

Illenium singles chronology
"Don't Give Up on Me" (2018)	"Gold (Stupid Love)" (2018)	"Take You Down" (2018)

"Gold (Stupid Love)" is a song by Canadian producer and DJ Excision and American musician, DJ and producer Illenium, featuring American singer-songwriter Shallows. It was released on 17 July 2018 by Abel's record label Excision Music and was distributed by Caption Records.

== Background and release ==
Near the end of March, Illenium tweeted that he and Excision were working together, with Excision teasing a project file on Instagram a month later. The song debuted during Illenium's DJ set at Electric Daisy Carnival Las Vegas in May 2018. On 10 July 2018, Excision tweeted that his collaboration with Illenium was "locked and loaded for release". Two days later, Excision announced that the collaboration was titled "Gold (Stupid Love)" and was to be released on 17 July 2018, with Illenium announcing the song later in the day.

"Gold (Stupid Love)" was featured on Abel's fourth studio album titled Apex, released on 14 August 2018. It was the fifth track on the album, which also includes 13 other songs.

== Critical reception ==
"Gold (Stupid Love)" was well received by most critics. Kierstin Rounsefell of EDM.com noted the two artists sound featured in the song, describing Illenium's as dreamy and Excision's as comparably "heavier, dirty sound to life, complete with vocal chops." Writing for Dancing Astronaut, Farrell Sweeney wrote that the song did not disappoint, and noted that Shallows' vocals "could fit into a pop track." Billboard's Kat Bein called the song's hook a "beat-heavy stomper full of mechanical texture", writing that Illenium lent the "dreamy horizons of his latest sounds" and describing Excision's style as a promise of "crunching bass." Charlie Vargas of EDMTunes noted the mix of Illenium's and Excision's styles, writing that the first drop consists of Illenium's known melodic dubstep style, with the following drop showcasing Excision's well-known style of heavy dubstep, both mixed with Shallow's lyrics that "draw you in with the relatable story of an unsure love and you get this incredible rendition of Shallow's track." Noiseporn's Brea Bone praised the song, writing that the song "artfully combines the production skills of Excision and Illenium with the vocal talents of Shallows to create a unique collaboration that is sure to be a hit." Writing for The Nocturnal Times, Ariana O'Keefe praised the song, calling it the "collaboration from heaven", writing that the song surpassed expectations and is "literally the definition of a banger."

== Track listing ==
Digital download – Single
No.	Title	Length
1.	"Gold (Stupid Love)"	4:55
Total length:		4:55

== Charts ==
Chart History	Peak position
Hot Dance/Electronic Songs (2018)	19
Dance/Electronic Digital Song Sales (2018)	8

== Credits and personnel ==
Personnel

- Lead vocals, songwriting – Shallows
- Production – Jeff Abel and Nicholas D. Miller

== Release history ==
Date	Format	Version	Label	Ref.
17 July 2018	Digital download	"Gold (Stupid Love)" [feat. Shallows]	Excision Music; Caption Records	
14 August 2018	Digital download	Apex	Excision Music; Caption Records	
