= Nightlight (Illenium and Annika Wells song) =

Single by Illenium and Annika Wells

from the album Fallen Embers
- Released: August 28, 2020
- Genre: Dance; future bass
- Length: 3:42
- Label: Warner Records
- Songwriters: Nicholas Miller; Annika Marie Wells
- Producer: Illenium

Illenium singles chronology
"Feel Something" (2020)	"Nightlight" (2020)	"Paper Thin" (2020)

Music video
- "Nightlight" on YouTube

"Nightlight" is a song by American DJ and producer Illenium and American singer Annika Wells. It is Illenium's first new single since signing with independent record label 12Tone and Warner Records.

== Background ==
Illenium said: "It's a love song, and it's a peaceful love song, where you're in the dark going through shit, and you have someone that's your light at the end of the tunnel, a way out...and hopefully, there's some news of maybe some life returning next year or something like that, and this music translates to some excitement from that, giving some more life to people who are struggling right now."

== Charts ==
=== Weekly charts ===
Chart (2020)	Peak position
US Hot Dance/Electronic Songs (Billboard)	8
US Hot Rock & Alternative Songs (Billboard)	15

=== Year-end charts ===
Chart (2020)	Position
US Hot Dance/Electronic Songs (Billboard)	30
US Hot Rock & Alternative Songs (Billboard)	74

Chart (2021)	Position
US Hot Dance/Electronic Songs (Billboard)	34

== See also ==
- List of Billboard number-one dance songs of 2020
