= Don't Give Up on Me (Kill the Noise and Illenium song) =

Single by Kill the Noise and Illenium featuring Mako
- Released: February 13, 2018
- Genre: Dubstep • Trap
- Length: 4:39
- Label: Proximity
- Songwriters: Nicholas D. Miller: Alex Seaver; Jacob Stanczak

Kill the Noise singles chronology
"Cold Hearted" (2017)	"Don't Give Up on Me" (2018)	"Horizon" (2018)

Illenium singles chronology
"Beautiful Creatures" (2017)	"Don't Give Up on Me" (2018)	"Gold (Stupid Love)" (2018)

"Don't Give Up on Me" is a song recorded by American dubstep DJs Kill the Noise and Illenium featuring American house DJ Mako, who contributed vocals. It was released on February 13, 2018, via Proximity.

== Background ==
"Don't Give Up on Me" was first leaked in the Reddit community by fans, who shared a link to the unlisted video that was published on Mako's YouTube channel. The video was immediately taken down and removed from public access.

The song is described as a genre-bending banger beginning with "a post-apocalyptic vibe" with "dark synths contrasted by layered harmonic vocals."

About the song, Illenium told Billboard "I've looked up to Kill the Noise for a while now, so it was awesome to get a chance to work on a song with him... I got the vocal from Mako and instantly fell in love with it."
