= Dabin (music producer) =

Canadian musician, DJ, and record producer

Background information
- Born: Dabin Lee; June 9, 1992 (age 34); Toronto, Ontario, Canada
- Origin: Toronto, Ontario, Canada
- Genres: EDM; future bass
- Occupations: DJ; record producer; musician
- Instruments: Guitar; synthesizers; sampler
- Years active: 2017–present
- Labels: Kannibalen; Seeking Blue
- Website: dabinmusic.com

Dabin Lee, who goes by the mononymous stage name Dabin, is a Canadian musician, DJ, and record producer. He has released three albums, the first of which was nominated for the Juno Award for Electronic Album of the Year in 2018. He has collaborated with major EDM artists including Illenium, Said the Sky, Seven Lions and Slander.

== Biography ==
Dabin was born and raised in Toronto on June 9, 1992, (Note: https://www.facebook.com/saidthesky/posts/happy-birthday-brother-how-lucky-am-i-to-do-life-with-you-dabin-to-the-moon/1295640851920928/) and is of Korean ethnicity.

His album Two Hearts was nominated for the Juno Award for Electronic Album of the Year in 2018.

Dabin collaborated with Slander and Seven Lions on the single "First Time", released on October 13, 2018.

He collaborated with Said the Sky on several songs including "Superstar" (feat. Linn) (2018) and "Hero" (feat. Olivver The Kid) (2019). The two performed together as Dab the Sky at the Digital Mirage Online Music Festival in 2020.

He was a guitarist and supporting member on Illenium's Awake (2017), Awake 2.0 (2018), and Ascend (2019) concert tours, On Christmas Day 2020, Dabin, Illenium, and Lights released the song "Hearts On Fire", which reached number 11 on the Billboard Dance/Electronic Songs chart and number 16 on the New Zealand Hot Singles (RMNZ) chart. He also participated in Illenium's Trilogy concert at Allegiant Stadium in Las Vegas on July 3, 2021. This was the stadium's first-ever music concert event since its opening.

His Into the Wild tour, which supported his second album Wild Youth, was postponed in 2020 (with some venues cancelled) because of the COVID-19 pandemic. In October 2021, he released his third studio album Between Broken and resumed his Into the Wild tour. He held a US tour to support his third album for the first half of 2022. His album single "Holding On" was featured on iHeartRadio and became the No. 1 added song of the week in mid-February 2022 after he won the iHeartRadio Future Star.

Dabin announced the Sanctuary Tour for the spring 2023 with support artists Ray Volpe, Jvna, Grabbitz, and Myrne. This includes a stop at the Red Rocks Amphitheatre, where he was reported to be the first Korean electronic music artist to headline that venue prior to cancellation of the event due to extreme weather, the Shrine in Los Angeles, and the Brooklyn Mirage / Avant Gardner.

== Dabin Presents Stay In Bloom ==
Starting in 2024, Dabin personally began curating Stay In Bloom, a two-day music festival primarily based in Stanford, California at the eponymous university's Frost Amphitheater, advertised as a "celebration of music, art, and community". The festival's name is a reference to Bloom, a song produced by Dabin in 2019 for the Wild Youth album and sung by Dia Frampton, with one of the eponymous lyrics being "Could we stay in bloom".

The idea of Stay In Bloom came when United Talent Agency approached Dabin with the idea of hosting a two-day festival at Frost Amphitheater following the success of his Sanctuary Tour in 2023. Dabin initially declined due to have never hosted a festival before nor one of such magnitude, but later agreed after giving it further thought and for his personal appreciation for the venue. Additionally, he had stated that the festival would be "a really cool way to bring my fans together and kind of celebrate being a community".

After the festival's success and conclusion, it was announced that Stay in Bloom would return for 2025, as well as make its debut in New York City and perform at the Under The K Bridge Park, Brooklyn. Unlike its California counterpart, Stay In Bloom NYC is a one-day festival.

Both festivals were announced to return in 2026. For the California festival, a community DJ contest was held for the first time with the grand prize being a live performance slot on the second day. The grand prize winner was announced on April 20, 2026.

Year	Event	Dates	Venue	Performers
2024	Dabin Presents Stay In Bloom	April 27–28, 2024	Frost Amphitheater, Stanford, California	Chyl; Dabin; Frosttop; Grabbitz; Jai Wolf; K?d; Nikademis; Noah J; Ray Volpe; Sundial; Tiffany Day; (Special Guests: Dia Frampton, Kai Wachi, Trella)
2025	Dabin Presents Stay In Bloom	April 26–27, 2025	Frost Amphitheater, Stanford, California	Audrey Nuna; Blanke; Dabin; Hoang; Johnny Chay; Max; Nikita The Wicked; Said The Sky; Tisoki; William Black; (Special Guest: Dia Frampton)
2025	Dabin Presents Stay In Bloom NYC	May 31, 2025	Under The K Bridge Park, Brooklyn	Audrey Nuna; Blanke; Dabin; Ericdoa; Jason Ross; Paper Skies; Senza; Wavedash; William Black; (Special Guest: Dia Frampton)
2026	Dabin Presents Stay In Bloom	May 1–2, 2026	Frost Amphitheater, Stanford, California	Chyl; Dabin; Demotapes; Juelz; Keenan Te; Klaxx; Louis the Child; Nurko; Slander; Yung Kai; (Special Guests: Dia Frampton, Grabbitz, Jason Ross, Senza, Trella) (Community DJ Contest Grand Prize Winner: Home By Dawn)
2026	Dabin Presents Stay In Bloom NYC	May 30, 2026	Under The K Bridge Park, Brooklyn	Armnhmr; Dabin; Illenium; Kai Wachi; Piao; Skybreak; Yung Kai

== Personal life ==
Dabin lives in Denver, Colorado.

== Discography ==
=== Albums ===
- Two Hearts (Kannibalen, 2017)
- Wild Youth (Seeking Blue, 2019)
- Between Broken (Seeking Blue, 2021)
- Aura Park (Kannibalen, 2025)

=== Extended plays ===
- Bloodless (Kannibalen, 2014)
- Wild Youth (acoustic EP, Seeking Blue, 2020)
