= Take You Down (Illenium song) =

2018 song by Illenium

Single by Illenium

from the album Ascend
- Released: August 3, 2018
- Genre: Future bass
- Length: 3:41
- Label: Astralwerks
- Songwriters: Nicholas Miller; Timothy James Price; Antonina Armato; Elio Armato
- Producers: Illenium; Rock Mafia

Illenium singles chronology
"Gold (Stupid Love)" (2018)	"Take You Down" (2018)	"God Damnit" (2018)

"Take You Down" is a song by American DJ and producer Illenium featuring uncredited vocals from Tim James of Rock Mafia. It was released on August 3, 2018, as the first single from Illenium's third studio album Ascend.

== Background ==
The song describes how Illenium's overdose on heroin nearly took his life. He wrote: "I was trapped in it, had no passion, no direction, and truly hated myself. It was such a dark time for me and my family because when it gets bad enough, hope begins to dim and there's no escaping reality." He explained how it felt to drag everyone around him down, simply because they loved him and would never give up hope.

== Music ==
Illenium wrote in the description of the music video for the song: “'Take You Down' is about my struggles with addiction and what it can do to families and loved ones. It’s more specifically about my mom, and how no matter what, she never gave up on me…To anyone struggling like I did, not just with addiction but anything in life, I hope you guys can find peace in your struggles and know that anything can be overcome. I’ve been clean since that overdose and I owe that to finding my passion and being surrounded by the most loving people I could ever ask for.”

== Charts ==
=== Weekly charts ===
Weekly chart performance for "Take You Down"
Chart (2018)	Peak position
US Hot Dance/Electronic Songs (Billboard)	23

=== Year-end charts ===
Year-end chart performance for "Take You Down"
Chart (2018)	Position
US Hot Dance/Electronic Songs (Billboard)	80
