= Crawl Outta Love =

Single by Illenium featuring Annika Wells

from the album Awake
- Released: August 7, 2017
- Genre: Future bass; melodic bass; midtempo
- Length: 4:02
- Label: Seeking Blue; Kasaya
- Songwriters: Nicholas Miller; Annika Marie Wells; Kate Morgan; Michael Biancaniello
- Producer: Illenium

Illenium singles chronology
"Where the Wild Things Are" (2017)	"Crawl Outta Love" (2017)	"Leaving" (2017)

Music video
- "Crawl Outta Love" on YouTube

"Crawl Outta Love" is a song by American DJ Illenium. Featuring singer Annika Wells, it is a single, released on August 7, 2017 via Seeking Blue/Kasaya Records, from his sophomore studio album Awake. It is the fourth single from the album.

== Background ==
The song was described as a "deep, earth-shattering" ballad with piano melodies and future bass breakdowns. Illenium told Forbes about the drop in the song: "One of my favorite parts is in the second drop when it goes into a fake drop. Playing that out to a huge crowd is one of the most incredible feelings ever."

== Composition ==
"Crawl Outta Love" is composed in the key of G Major with a tempo of 85 BPM. It has a chord progression of C–G–D–Am.

== Critical reception ==
"Crawl Outta Love" was awarded the International Songwriting Competition (ISC) grand prize, one of the most prestigious honors for songwriters. The award was split four ways, between Nick Miller (Illenium), vocalist Annika Wells, Kate Morgan and Michael Biancaniello.

== Charts ==
Chart (2017)	Peak position
US Hot Dance/Electronic Songs (Billboard)	30

== Release history ==
Region	Date	Format	Label	Ref.
Various	August 7, 2017	Digital download; streaming	Seeking Blue / Kasaya	
