= Hearts on Fire (Illenium, Dabin and Lights song) =

2020 song by Illenium, Dabin and Lights

Single by Illenium and Dabin featuring Lights

from the album Fallen Embers
- Released: December 25, 2020
- Genre: Melodic dubstep
- Length: 3:56
- Label: Warner Records
- Songwriters: Nicholas Miller; Dabin Lee; Lights Poxleitner-Bokan; Taylor Dearman
- Producers: Illenium; Dabin

Illenium singles chronology
"Paper Thin" (2020)	"Hearts on Fire" (2020)	"First Time" (2021)

Lights singles chronology
"Batshit" (2020)	"Hearts on Fire" (2020)

Music video
- "Hearts on Fire" on YouTube

"Hearts on Fire" is a song by American DJ and producer Illenium and Canadian producer Dabin featuring Canadian singer-songwriter Lights. It was released on December 25, 2020, via 12 Tone Music and Warner Records. The song was written by Illenium, Dabin, Lights, Taylor Dearman and produced by Illenium and Dabin.

== Background ==
About the song, Dabin shared in Instagram: "Nick and I always talked about making something but we could never find the right moment. With both of us being stuck at home it was the perfect opportunity to start something together and we’re so happy with how this one turned out."

== Content ==
The song told a story of difficult relationship filled with uncertainties, and the chorus pleaded for clarity, asked for a sign which the relationship was still strong.

== Composition ==
The song merges melodic dubstep, rock and pop, and it features multi instrumentalist and producer Dabin strumming out guitar riffs along with Lights' vocals. This one is more of a slow burn that progresses along with heart-wrenching vocals and swelling synths and is punctuated with spurts of powerful guitar chords and drum crashes.

== Music video ==
The music video premiered on January 14, 2021, along with the Timmy Trumpet remix. directed by Caleb Mallery and produced visual effects by Nic Torres and Fractal VFX. Two separated lovers seek out each other once more. Sparks fly when the protagonists finally find each other in a room with an alluring, glowing orb as a mysterious figure reignites their flame.

== Charts ==
=== Weekly charts ===
Weekly chart performance for "Hearts on Fire"
Chart (2021)	Peak position
New Zealand Hot Singles (RMNZ)	16
US Hot Dance/Electronic Songs (Billboard)	11
US Hot Rock & Alternative Songs (Billboard)	35

=== Year-end charts ===
Year-end chart performance for "Hearts on Fire"
Chart (2021)	Position
US Hot Dance/Electronic Songs (Billboard)	50
