= Good Things Fall Apart =

Single by Illenium and Jon Bellion

from the album Ascend
- Released: May 13, 2019
- Genre: Future bass; pop; alternative rock
- Length: 3:36
- Label: Astralwerks
- Songwriters: Nicholas Miller; James Abrahart; Jason Evigan; Jon Bellion; Sarah Hudson
- Producers: Illenium; Jason Evigan

Illenium singles chronology
"Pray" (2019)	"Good Things Fall Apart" (2019)	"Takeaway" (2019)

Jon Bellion singles chronology
"Stupid Deep" (2018)	"Good Things Fall Apart" (2019)	"Crop Circles" (2019)

Music video
- "Good Things Fall Apart" on YouTube

"Good Things Fall Apart" is a song by American EDM producer Illenium and American singer-songwriter Jon Bellion. It was released on May 13, 2019, on Astralwerks, alongside its lyric video. It serves as the fourth single from Illenium's third studio album Ascend. It became Illenium's first top ten hit on the US Dance/Electronic Songs chart, peaking at number 4.

== Background ==
The song was first teased on April 26, 2019, by Illenium and Jon Bellion via their Twitter accounts. Bellion tweeted that he missed "sadboy anthems of the Yellowcard/Dashboard Confessional/Taking Back Sunday era". Illenium then somewhat confirmed a collab by responding to Bellion's tweet, writing "Sadboi anthem incoming".

== Music video ==
The song's release was accompanied by the lyric video, followed by a music video on June 10, 2019. Directed by Jeremi Durand, the video follows two astronauts attempting to flee the planet as it is destroyed; scenes of Illenium and Bellion performing the song in military wardrobe are intercut throughout the video.

== Other uses ==
The song is available as DLC for Rock Band 4.

"Tiësto's Big Room Remix" premiered on July 12, 2019.

Travis Barker remixed the song and released it on YouTube on December 3, 2019.

== Charts ==
=== Weekly charts ===
Chart (2019–2020)	Peak position
Canada Rock (Billboard)	45
New Zealand Hot Singles (RMNZ)	38
Ukraine Airplay (TopHit)	67
US Bubbling Under Hot 100 (Billboard)	1
US Adult Pop Airplay (Billboard)	18
US Hot Dance/Electronic Songs (Billboard)	3
US Pop Airplay (Billboard)	30
US Rock & Alternative Airplay (Billboard)	6

=== Year-end charts ===
Chart (2019)	Position
US Hot Dance/Electronic Songs (Billboard)	10
US Rock Airplay (Billboard)	20
Chart (2020)	Position
US Hot Dance/Electronic Songs (Billboard)	12

== Certifications ==
Region	Certification	Certified units/sales
Brazil (Pro-Música Brasil)	Gold	20,000^{‡}
New Zealand (RMNZ)	Gold	15,000^{‡}
United States (RIAA)	2× Platinum	2,000,000^{‡}
^{‡} Sales+streaming figures based on certification alone.

== Release history ==
Region	Date	Format	Label	Ref.
Various	May 13, 2019	Digital download; streaming	Astralwerks	
