= Sideways (Illenium song) =

2021 song by Illenium

Single by Illenium, Valerie Broussard and Nurko

from the album Fallen Embers
- Released: May 7, 2021
- Genre: Melodic Dubstep
- Length: 4:11
- Label: Warner Records
- Songwriters: Nicholas Miller; Benjamin Samama; David Breadmore Arkwright; Jack Leech; Valerie Broussard
- Producers: Illenium; Nurko

Illenium singles chronology
"First Time" (2021)	"Sideways" (2021)	"Heavenly Side" (2021)

Music video
- "Sideways" on YouTube

"Sideways" is a song by American DJs and producers Illenium and Nurko, featuring singer/songwriter Valerie Broussard. It was released on May 7, 2021, as the fifth single from Illenium's fourth studio album Fallen Embers.

== Background ==
Before it was released, Illenium previewed the song at Ubbi Dubbi 2021.

Singer and songwriter Valerie Broussard described: “‘Sideways’ was written as an ode to a friend who was struggling with her mental health during COVID-19 pandemic lockdown. Having struggled similarly in my own life, I wanted her to know I would always be there for her, even when it felt like the world was falling apart.”

== Charts ==
=== Weekly charts ===
Weekly chart performance for "Sideways"
Chart (2021)	Peak position
New Zealand Hot Singles (RMNZ)	33
US Hot Dance/Electronic Songs (Billboard)	10

=== Year-end charts ===
Year-end chart performance for "Sideways"
Chart (2021)	Position
US Hot Dance/Electronic Songs (Billboard)	33
