= Said the Sky =

American DJ and producer (born 1993)

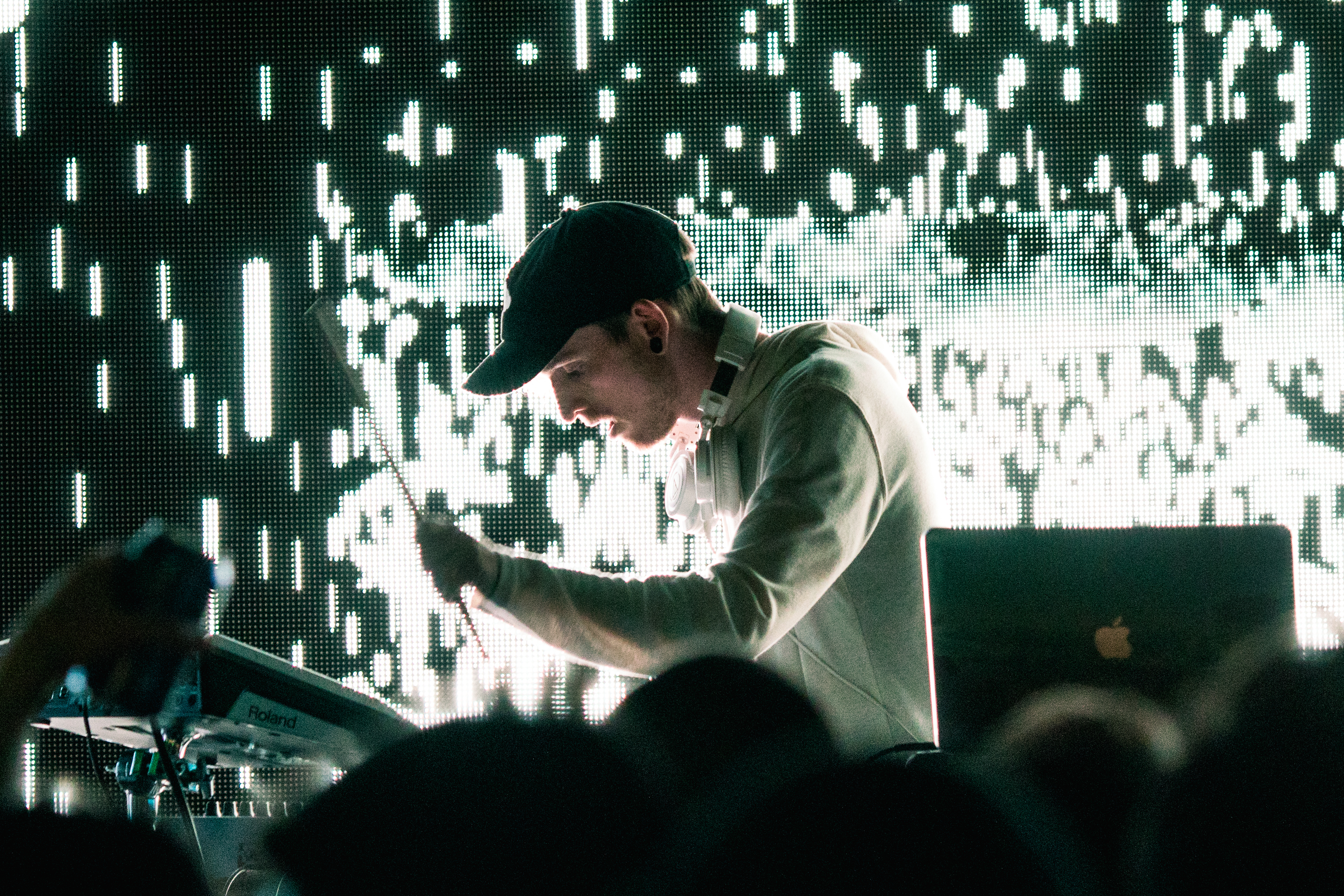
- Said The Sky performing in 2017

Background information
- Born: Trevor Christensen; May 12, 1993 (age 33); Denver, Colorado, U.S.
- Genres: Dubstep; trap; tropical house; future bass; pop-punk
- Occupations: DJ; record producer; musician
- Instruments: Keyboards; guitar; drums; percussion; sampler
- Years active: 2014–present
- Labels: Kasaya; Seeking Blue; Gravitas Recordings; Blume; Monstercat
- Website: saidthesky.com

Trevor Christensen (born May 12, 1993), known professionally as Said the Sky, is an American electronic dance music producer, DJ and musician.

== Early life ==
At the age of 8, Christensen started piano lessons, which he had disliked. He quit the lessons after several years but later rejoined it while he was in middle school, along picking up other instruments to learn. He first got into electronic dance music by learning about the production at a Digital Audio Production class in high school.

Christensen uses Ableton Live to produce music. Previously, he used Logic Pro. He attended Berklee College Of Music where he took a lot of beginner/intermediate courses such as music theory, ear training and lessons, prior to launching the 'Said the Sky' project, despite failing to participate in their production program.

== Music career ==
=== 2014: Debut extended play ===
Christensen was signed by Phase Management, who he was introduced to at a music festival in the summer of 2014. He knew and was inspired by some of the artists under Phase Management, which motivated him to sign for them.

On June 8, 2014, he self-released his debut EP Faith. Tyler Trew of YourEDM reviewed the EP stating, "He plays into both of his strengths, utilizing piano heavily throughout his productions in conjunction with superior sound design, most notably in the neuro basses that can be found in all of his singles on Faith. You get the most bass with "Everything" which starts off the EP quite perfectly and ever so celestially; piano and an inspiring vocal speech lead you into what is to come. That being some of the most beautifully epic music you are going to hear."

=== 2015: Singles ===
On July 9, 2015, Christensen released four singles including two collaborations with Illenium onto iTunes. The singles are "Falling In", "In Your Wake", "Run Away" and "Book of Us". Speaking about his collaboration and tours with Illenium, Christensen said touring with him was a 'dream come true' and he had never thought of doing so at that time in his life.

On July 17, 2015, he released "Espy" as a single and four days later, he released an EP titled Painted White with Illenium and Cristina Soto.

On July 30, 2015, he released three singles "Disciple", "For You" and "Everything" where the first two features Melissa Hayes. He released four more singles later in the year, titled "Darling", "Nostalgia", "Listen" and "Mountains". Missio features on "Darling" and "Nostalgia" whereas Diamond Eyes features on "Mountains". "Disciple", "Everything" and "Listen" are singles from his EP Faith.

=== 2016—present: Collaborations ===
On January 22, 2016, he released his first single of the year "Ares". In August 2016, it was revealed that Christensen collaborated with Illenium and Seven Lions for a song that was debuted at Das Energi Festival 2016. Christensen has supported Illenium on his headline tour across the United States.

On April 30, 2016, Christensen performed at Denver's Gothic Theatre, he also toured with Illenium, who also performed at Denver.

On October 10, 2016, he released a single with DJs Illenium and Seven Lions titled "Rush Over Me" featuring the vocals of Haliene. The song was first premiered by Illenium during a live show at Das Energi in Salt Lake City, Utah, in August.

On October 14, 2016, he collaborated with fellow DJ 3lau to release the single "Fire" featuring NÉONHÈART. Speaking in an interview, 3lau said that Christensen sent him a "fantastic piano riff, and (they) built the song out of that". All revenue generated from Christensen's and 3lau's collaborative single "Fire" will be donated to PoP, a non-profit organization that "builds schools and expands educational opportunities in the developing world." The song's genre is future bass. The song was released via 3lau's non-profit record label, Blume. An official music video was uploaded by popular music channel, Proximity, on November 14, 2016, which has garnered over 200,000 views.

On November 16, 2016, Christensen released a remix of The Chainsmokers' second song off their EP "Collage", titled "All We Know".

In 2017 he co-produced "Where'd U Go" with Illenium (available on Illenium's album "Awake").

In 2018, he released his first studio album Wide-Eyed, which has featured collaborations with Jack Newsome, Vancouver Sleep Clinic, Matthew Koma, and Dabin.

On December 13, 2021, he announced the title of his second studio album Sentiment, and an upcoming tour in 2022 including collaborations with Dabin and Matthew Koma.

On November 14, 2025, Said The Sky's third album, Closer to the Sun, was released.

== Discography ==
=== Studio albums ===
Title	Details
Wide-Eyed	Released: July 20, 2018; Label: Seeking Blue; Format: Digital download, vinyl
Sentiment	Released: February 18, 2022; Label: Lowly; Format: Digital Download
Closer to the Sun	Released: November 14, 2025; Label: Seeking Blue; Format: Digital download
Salt & Silence	Released: January 30, 2026; Label: Seeking Blue; Format: Digital download

=== Extended plays ===
Title	Details
Faith	Released: June 8, 2014; Label: Independent; Format: Digital download; Producer: Said the Sky
Painted White	Released: July 21, 2015; Label: Gravitas Recordings; Format: Digital download; Producer: Said the Sky

=== Singles ===
==== As lead artist ====
Title	Year	Peak chart positions		Album
Title	Year	US		Album
Title	Year	Digital	Hot	Album
"Falling In" (with Illenium featuring Mimi Page)	2015	—	—	Non-album singles
"In Your Wake" (with Illenium featuring Jeza)	2015	—	—	Non-album singles
"Run Away" (featuring Car)	2015	—	—	Non-album singles
"Book of Us" (featuring Mothica)	2015	—	—	Non-album singles
"Espy"	2015	—	—	Non-album singles
"Disciple" (featuring Melissa Hayes)	2015	—	—	Faith
"For You" (featuring Melissa Hayes)	2015	—	—	Non-album single
"Everything"	2015	—	—	Faith
"Darling" (featuring Missio)	2015	—	—	Non-album singles
"Nostalgia" (featuring Missio)	2015	—	—	Non-album singles
"Listen"	2015	—	—	Faith
"Mountains" (featuring Diamond Eyes)	2015	—	—	Non-album singles
"Ares"	2016	—	—	Non-album singles
"Rush Over Me" (with Seven Lions and Illenium featuring Haliene)	2016	35	50	Non-album singles
"Fire" (with 3lau featuring NÉONHÈART)	2016	—	—	Non-album singles
"Show & Tell" (featuring Claire Ridgely)	2017	—	—	Wide-Eyed
"Pray for Me" (featuring Origami)	2017	—	—	Wide-Eyed
"All I Got" (featuring Kwesi)	2017	—	—	Wide-Eyed
"Faded" (featuring FRND)	2017	—	—	Wide-Eyed
"Sound of Where’d You Go" (with Illenium and 1788-L)	2018	—	—	Awake (Remixes)
"Over Getting Over You" (featuring Matthew Koma)	2018	—	—	Wide-Eyed
"Superstar" (with Dabin featuring Linn)	2018	—	—	Wide-Eyed
"Potions" (with Slander featuring JT Roach)	2019	—	—	Non-album singles
"Already Know" (with Adventure Club featuring Caly Bevier)	2019	—	—	Non-album singles
"Hero" (with Dabin featuring Olivver the Kid)	2019	—	—	Non-album singles
"We Know Who We Are" (with Olivver the Kid)	2021	—	—	Sentiment
"Treading Water"	2021	—	—	Sentiment
"Go On Then, Love" (with The Maine)	2021	—	—	Sentiment
"Walk Me Home" (with Illenium and Chelsea Cutler)	2022	—	—	Sentiment
"Picture" (with SLANDER and Alison Wonderland)	2022	—	18	Non-album single
"Glass House" (with Terry Zhong and CVBZ)	2023	_	_	Non-album Single
"All Falls Down" (with William Black)	2024	—	—	Non-album single
"Love Let Me Go" (with Dia Frampton)	2025	_	_	Non-album Singles
"Reminisce" (with Taylor Acorn)	2025	_	_	Non-album Singles
"How To Say Goodbye" (featuring Jessica Baio)	2025	_	_	Non-album Singles
"Heavenly" (with Parson James)	2025	_	_	Closer To The Sun
"Are You With Me" (with Justin Jesso)	2025	_	_	Closer To The Sun
"Right Here"	2025	_	_	Closer To The Sun
"Dance In The Rain" (with Knox)	2025	_	_	Closer To The Sun
"Wings" (with Baby Blue)	2026	_	_	Salt & Silence
"M.I.A."	2026	_	_	Icarus & I
"Embrace The Darkness" (with RYVM)	2026	_	_	Icarus & I
"Yellow Lights" (with Virtual Riot and HYMNALS)	2026	—	—	Non-album singles
"When The Light Breaks" (with Illenium and Heather Sommer)	2026	—	—	Non-album singles
"—" denotes a recording that did not chart or was not released.

=== Guest appearances ===
List of non-single guest appearances, with other performing artists, showing year released and album name
Title	Year	Other artist(s)	Album
"Where'd U Go"	2017	Illenium	Awake
"Sad Songs"	2019	Illenium, Annika Wells	Ascend
"Crazy Times"	2021	Illenium, Rock Mafia	Fallen Embers
"I See You"	2021	Illenium	Fallen Embers (Deluxe Version)
"Other Side"	2023	Illenium, Vera Blue	ILLENIUM

=== Remixes ===
==== 2014 ====
- Secoya – "Run" (Illenium and Said the Sky Remix)
- Gemini – "A Fire Inside" (Said the Sky Remix)
- Novo Amor & Ed Tullett – "Faux" (Said the Sky Remix)
- Snow Dayy – "The Tunnel" (Said the Sky Remix)

==== 2015 ====
- Enkidu – "Falling" (Illenium & Said the Sky Remix)

==== 2016 ====
- Seven Lions featuring LIGHTS – "Falling Away" (Said the Sky Remix)
- Ellie Goulding – "Something in the Way You Move" (Said the Sky Remix)
- ATB – "Flash X" (Said the Sky Remix)
- Owl City – "Fireflies" (Said the Sky Remix)
- The Chainsmokers – "All We Know" (Said the Sky Remix)

==== 2017 ====
- Galantis – "Rich Boy" (Said The Sky Remix)

==== 2018 ====
- Selena Gomez and Marshmello – "Wolves" (Said The Sky Remix)
- RL Grime – "Atoms" (Said The Sky Remix)

==== 2021 ====
- Kane Brown and Blackbear – "Memory" (Said The Sky Remix)
