= Anna Clendening =

American singer, actor, and Internet personality

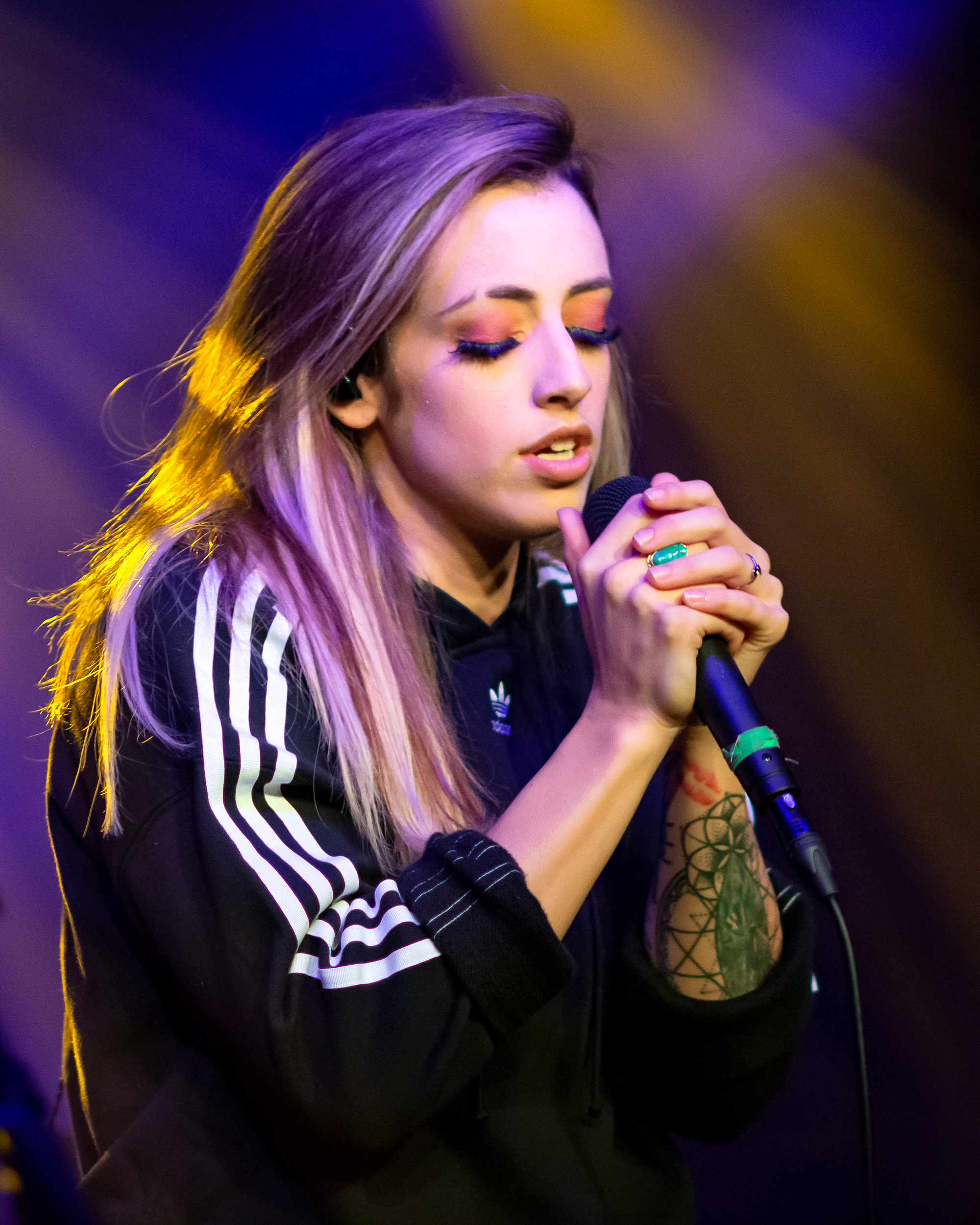
- Born: March 12, 1993 (age 33); Chapel Hill, North Carolina, U.S
- Education: University of North Carolina at Charlotte
- Occupations: Singer; actress

YouTube information
- Channel: Anna Clendening
- Years active: 2008–present
- Genres: Music; vlogs
- Subscribers: 743 thousand
- Views: 173.4 million
- Last updated: 14 July 2020
- Website: Official website

Anna Clendening (born March 12, 1993) is an American singer, actress, and Internet personality, known originally for being one of the most followed people on the now-defunct video sharing service Vine, and later as a contestant on season 9 of America's Got Talent. Now focusing primarily on her music career, Clendening has amassed over 144 million views on her YouTube channel and over 300 million streams on Spotify as of March 2022.

== Early life ==
Clendening was born in Chapel Hill, North Carolina, to parents Vickie Moore Clendening and Michael Clendening. At age 14, Anna was discovered to have severe anxiety and depression. While suffering from panic attacks due to her anxiety, Anna turned to music and began writing and performing songs in her bedroom.

== Career ==
Clendening's debut EP, "waves", was released on February 22, 2019, on the East West Records label. In April 2019, Clendening embarked on The Waves Tour, performing in eight U.S. cities.

In 2019, Clendening joined the roster at Sony/ATV's new joint venture, TwentySeven Music Publishing.

Clendening has recorded collaborations with several artists including Illenium, Matoma, Lost Kings, Gnash, Phantoms, John.k, and Vicetone.

She signed a record deal with Atlantic as of June 12, 2020 but as of 2024 beginning with "Help", her songs have been released independently.

Clendening announced on her Instagram page on February 6, 2026 that she would be touring for the first time in six years, opening for singer Alexander Stewart on his "What If?" tour.

== Personal life ==
Clendening resides in Los Angeles, California.

== Discography ==
=== Extended plays ===
Title	Details
Waves	Released: February 22, 2019; Label: East West Records; Format: Digital download, streaming
Evolve	Released: October 9, 2020; Label: Atlantic; Format: Digital download, streaming
Untitled X's	Released: September 9, 2022; Label: Atlantic; Format: Digital download, streaming

==== Singles ====
===== These releases do not include remixes or acoustic versions. =====
Title	Year	Album
"To My Parents"	2016	Non-album single
"Boys Like You"	2017	Waves
"Invisible"	2018	Waves
"Dead End"	2019	Waves
"If I'm Being Honest"	2019	Non-album single
"Get Me"	2020	Evolve
"Love Song" (with John.k)	2020	Evolve
"Girls Like You"	2022	Non-album singles
"Bare Minimum"	2022	Non-album singles
"Bad Again"	2023	Non-album singles
"See You Again" (with Vicetone)	2023	Non-album singles
"Save You"	2023	Non-album singles
"Somebody to You" (with CVBZ and teamwork.)	2024	Non-album singles
"Help"	2024	Non-album singles
"Disconnecting"	2024	Non-album singles
"Easier"	2024	Non-album singles
"Happy Ending"	2025	Non-album singles
"I'm Trying"	2025	Non-album singles
"I Feel Good" (with Easy McCoy)	2025	Non-album singles
"Heavy" (with Zachy)	2025	Non-album singles
"Leaving You Is Hard"	2026	Non-album singles

==== Selected Collaborations ====
Title	Year	Album
"Too Far Gone" (with Lost Kings)	2019	non-album single
"Say It" (with Phantoms)	2019	Disconnect
"Broken Ones" (with Illenium)	2019	ASCEND
"33 Days" (with Keenan and Gnash)	2020	non-album singles
"Let It Go" (with Matoma)	2020	non-album singles
"Feel Like This" (with Etham)	2025	Everything & Nothing

== Filmography ==
=== Television ===
Year	Title	Role	Notes
2014	America's Got Talent	Herself	5 episodes
