= Awake (Illenium album) =

Studio album by Illenium
- Released: September 21, 2017
- Genre: Future bass; melodic dubstep
- Length: 47:07
- Label: Seeking Blue; Kasaya
- Producer: Nicholas Miller; Trevor Christensen; Dan Griffith; David Pramik

Illenium chronology
| Ashes (2016) | Awake (2017) | Ascend (2019) |

Singles from Awake
- 1. "Fractures" Released: February 6, 2017; 2. "Feel Good" Released: March 3, 2017; 3. "Sound of Walking Away" Released: April 24, 2017; 4. "Crawl Outta Love" Released: August 7, 2017; 5. "Leaving" Released: September 15, 2017

Awake is the second studio album by American DJ Illenium, released via Seeking Blue/Kasaya Records on September 21, 2017.

== Background ==
Consisting of 13 songs, the album includes five previously released singles titled "Fractures", "Feel Good", "Sound of Walking Away", "Crawl Outta Love" and "Leaving". Illenium played the 12th track "Beautiful Creatures" at the Hakkasan Nightclub. He also announced the Awake tour, in which he would perform in November and December. He announced the release date of the album on August 8, 2017, in one of his internet online fan communities one day after releasing the final single from the album. He posted with the caption "Album release getting ANNOUNCED with crawl Monday. Pre order avail next week." Illenium spoke about the album's comparison to his previous one, he said "A lot of strong vocals and melodies but more recorded elements than Ashes. The new album is a split between vocal stuff and chill instrumental tracks." Illenium released the fifth single "Leaving" on September 15, 2017.

== Track listing ==
| No. | Title | Writer(s) | Producer(s) | Length |
|---|---|---|---|---|
| 1. | "Needed You" (featuring Dia Frampton) | Dia Frampton; Melanie Fontana | Illenium | 5:05 |
| 2. | "Crawl Outta Love" (featuring Annika Wells) | Nicholas Miller; Annika Wells; Kate Morgan; Michael Biancaniello | Illenium | 4:02 |
| 3. | "No Time Like Now" | Miller | Illenium | 2:03 |
| 4. | "Free Fall" (featuring RUNN) | Miller; Avena Savage | Illenium | 3:25 |
| 5. | "Where'd U Go" (with Said the Sky) | Miller; Trevor Christensen | Illenium; Said the Sky | 3:04 |
| 6. | "Fractures" (featuring Nevve) | Miller; Keeley Bumford; Henri Lanz; William Rappaport | Illenium | 4:05 |
| 7. | "Leaving" | Miller; Jonathon Ng" | Illenium | 3:54 |
| 8. | "Lost" (featuring Emilie Brandt) | Miller; Emilie Brandt; Joshua Napert; Matthew Wirnsberger | Illenium | 3:20 |
| 9. | "Sound of Walking Away" (with Kerli) | Miller; Kerli Kõiv; Brennan Strawn | Illenium | 4:13 |
| 10. | "Taking Me Higher" | Miller | Illenium | 2:44 |
| 11. | "Feel Good" (with Gryffin featuring Daya) | Dan Griffith; Miller; Grace Tandon; Tobias Gad; Nisha Asnani | Gryffin; Illenium | 4:08 |
| 12. | "Beautiful Creatures" (featuring MAX) | Robert Gillies; Jacob Hawkes; David Pramik; Charlie Snyder | Illenium | 4:00 |
| 13. | "Let You Go" (featuring Ember Island) | Miller; Alexandra Andersson; Didrik Franzén; Joakim Bergkvist | Illenium | 3:04 |
| Total length: | | | | 47:07 |

• Leaving features uncredited vocals from Eden

== Charts ==
=== Weekly charts ===
| Chart (2017) | Peak position |
|---|---|
| Canadian Albums (Billboard) | 92 |
| New Zealand Heatseekers Albums (RMNZ) | 8 |
| US Billboard 200 | 106 |
| US Top Dance Albums (Billboard) | 3 |

=== Year-end charts ===
| Year | Chart | Position |
|---|---|---|
| 2018 | US Top Dance/Electronic Albums (Billboard) | 15 |
| 2019 | US Top Dance/Electronic Albums (Billboard) | 20 |
