= Tim James (musician) =

American singer-songwriter

- Born: Timothy James Price; Marysville, Michigan, U.S.
- Origin: Apple Valley, California
- Genres: Pop
- Occupations: Singer; songwriter; record producer
- Instruments: Vocals, guitar, drums
- Years active: 2000–present
- Label: C2 Records

Timothy James Price is an American songwriter and record producer. James is the co-founder of Rock Mafia. James co-wrote the songs "Potential Breakup Song" by Aly & AJ, "Come Back to Me" by Vanessa Hudgens, "See You Again" by Miley Cyrus, "Naturally" and "Love You like a Love Song" by Selena Gomez & the Scene. James collaborates with production partner Antonina Armato. He has also worked with The Cheetah Girls. He also sang "Twist My Hips" on the show Shake It Up, which he sang with Nevermind. He provided the vocals for the League of Legends 2016 World Championship Music Video, "Ignite". James also provided vocals for the song "Take You Down" by electronic music producer Illenium.
