= Illenium =

American musician, DJ, producer, and songwriter (born 1990)

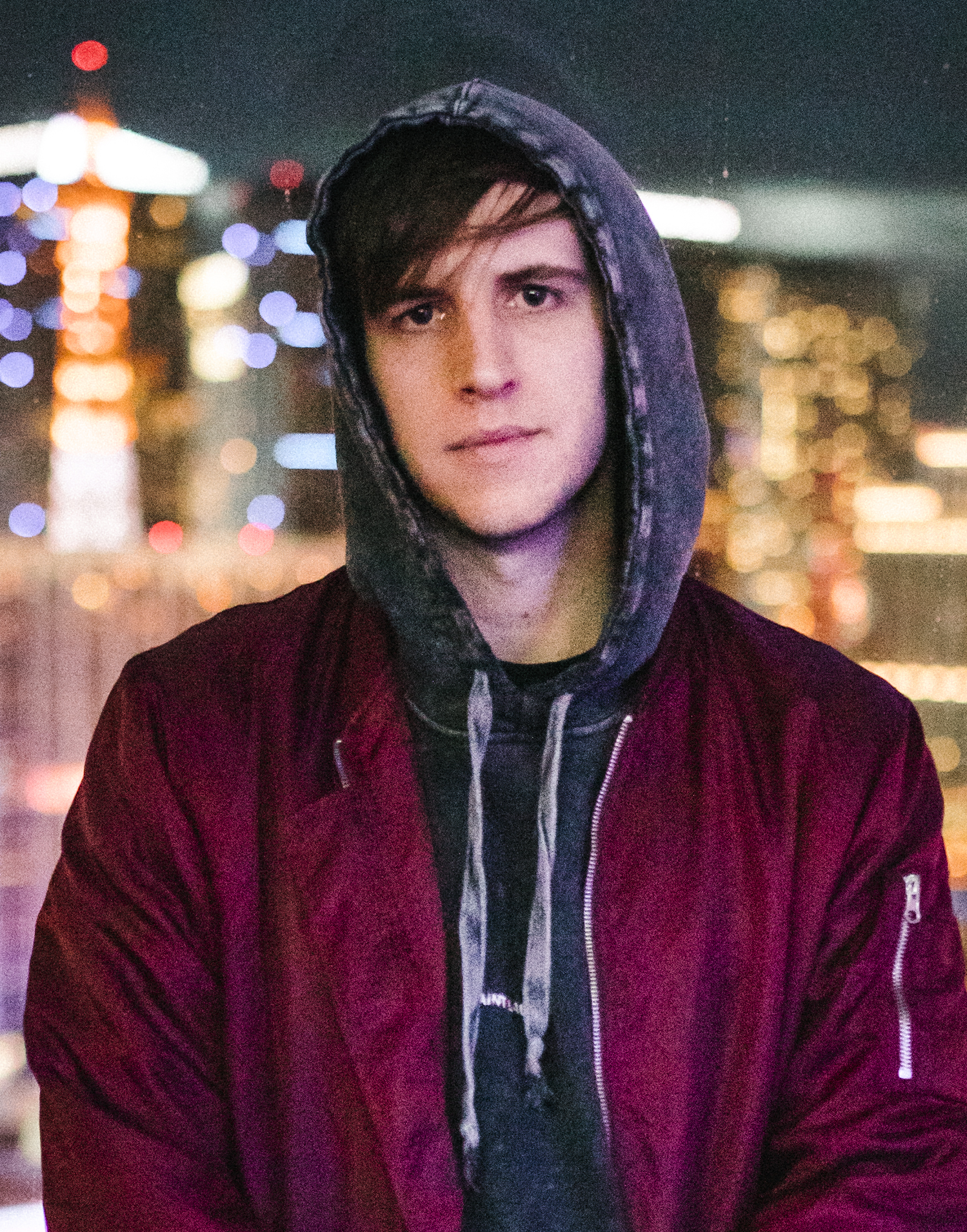
- Illenium in 2019
- Born: Nicholas Daniel Miller; December 26, 1990 (age 35); Downers Grove, Illinois, U.S.
- Occupations: DJ; record producer; songwriter
- Years active: 2008–present
- Spouse: Lara McWhorter (m. 2023)
- Musical career
- Genres: Future bass; dubstep; progressive house; electro house; pop punk; electronic rock; drum n bass
- Instruments: Keyboards; guitar; drums
- Labels: Republic; Warner; 12 Tone Music; Astralwerks; Kasaya; The EDM Network; Seeking Blue; Prep School Recordings; Gravitas Recordings; Armada Music; Owsla; Uplink Audio; Artist Intelligence Agency
- Website: illenium.com

Nicholas Daniel Miller (born December 26, 1990), professionally known as Illenium (stylized in all caps), is an American musician, DJ, music producer, and songwriter. He has released six studio albums, his most recent being Odyssey, released in February 2026. Illenium earned his first Grammy nomination following the release of his fourth studio album, Fallen Embers, released in July 2021. One of Illenium's more notable albums, Ascend, was released in August 2019 on Astralwerks. The album was Illenium's first to top the Billboard Dance/Electronic Albums chart and also reached his highest peak on the Billboard 200 at number 14.

A total of 57 of Illenium's songs have appeared on the Billboard Hot Dance/Electronic Songs chart, including two singles in 2019 that peaked at number 3: "Good Things Fall Apart" with Jon Bellion and "Takeaway" with the Chainsmokers (featuring Lennon Stella). Illenium has also worked on numerous notable remixes, including those for The Chainsmokers' "Don't Let Me Down", Taylor Swift's "Anti-Hero" and Flume's "Say It", the latter of which won the award for "Remix of the Year" at the inaugural Electronic Music Awards in 2017. He was included in the Forbes 30 Under 30 music list in 2020. His music has collectively accumulated over 1 billion streams on various platforms.

== Early life and education ==
Nicholas Daniel Miller was born in Downers Grove, Illinois on December 26, 1990. He lived in Seattle and France, eventually settling with his parents in San Francisco, where he would attend St. Ignatius College Preparatory.

In 2008, Miller began producing electronic music. In the summer of 2012, he saw Bassnectar perform at Red Rocks Amphitheatre and decided to focus more earnestly on music. In 2013, Miller moved to Denver, where he continues to reside. He also attended the University of Colorado Denver. During this period, he completed his first EP. He also coached lacrosse at Aspen High School and delivered sushi to support himself.

== Career ==
=== 2013–2015: Early career, two EPs, and collaborations ===
Illenium released his first self-titled EP in May 2013 on Prep School Recordings. That year, he also released a remix of Florence and the Machine's "Over the Love". In January 2014, he independently released his follow-up EP, Risen, which contained the song "Drop Our Hearts" featuring Sirma. He also continued releasing remixes, including those for Lana Del Rey's "Flipside" and Odesza's "Always This Late".

In 2015, Illenium released several singles, including "Chosen You", "Painted White" (with Said the Sky and Christina Soto), and "I'll Be Your Reason" (featuring Eden). The latter song was released on Skrillex's Nest HQ platform. Illenium's remixes that year included those for Galantis' "Gold Dust", Kill Paris' "Operate" featuring Royal, and Kaskade's "Disarm You" (featuring Ilsey).

=== 2016: Ashes and notable remixes ===
In February 2016, Illenium released his debut studio album, Ashes, as a free download on Seeking Blue Records and his own recently established imprint, Kasaya Records. The album featured 10 songs (12 on the bonus version) including "Reverie" (featuring King Deco), "With You" (featuring Quinn XCII), and "Fortress" (featuring Joni Fatora). The album peaked at number 6 on the Billboard Top Dance/Electronic Albums chart and at number 19 on the Heatseekers Albums chart. An album of Ashes remixes was released in December 2016, at which time Illenium embarked on the "Ashes Tour" in select cities across the United States.

Illenium also released two notable remixes in 2016: The Chainsmokers' "Don't Let Me Down" and Flume's "Say It" (featuring Tove Lo). His remix of "Don't Let Me Down" premiered in March 2016. Although the release was initially unofficial, it was later included in The Chainsmokers' official remix collection. By the end of the year, the song had accumulated over 60 million streams on SoundCloud and was still the most played remix on the platform in 2018 with over 101 million streams. Illenium's remix of "Say It" was released in September 2016. That remix would go on to win the award for "Remix of the Year" at the first Electronic Music Awards in September 2017. In October 2016, Illenium also released a collaboration with Said the Sky and Seven Lions entitled "Rush Over Me" (featuring Haliene). That song charted at number 50 on the Billboard Hot Dance/Electronic Songs chart.

=== 2017–2018: Awake and numerous appearances on Billboard charts ===
In February 2017, Illenium released the song "Fractures" featuring Nevve. He followed that with the collaborative single, "Feel Good", with Gryffin and featuring Daya in March 2017. Both songs charted on the Hot Dance/Electronic Songs chart (at number 42 and 17, respectively). In July 2017, Illenium collaborated with EDM duo, Zeds Dead, to produce the track "Where The Wild Things Are". The following month, he released the single, "Crawl Outta Love" featuring Annika Wells. The song would peak at number 35 on the Hot Dance/Electronic Songs chart and also won Illenium (and his writing partners) the top prize of the International Songwriting Competition the following year.

In September 2017, Illenium released his sophomore album, Awake, on Seeking Blue Records and Kasaya Records. The album featured 13 tracks including the aforementioned "Fractures", "Feel Good", and "Crawl Outta Love". It became Illenium's first album to chart on the Billboard 200, peaking at number 106. It also peaked at number 3 on the Top Dance/Electronic Albums chart. Beginning in November 2017, Illenium embarked on the "Awake Tour" across the country in support of the album. Throughout the tour, he was joined on stage by frequent collaborators Said the Sky and Dabin. In December 2017, an EP of official Awake piano covers was released, and, in June 2018, an album of Awake remixes dropped.

In 2018, Illenium released three collaborations that charted on the Hot Dance/Electronic Songs chart: "Don't Give Up on Me" with Kill the Noise and Mako at number 35, "Gold (Stupid Love)" with Excision and Shallows at number 19, and "God Damnit" with Call Me Karizma at number 33. He also released a remix of Halsey's "Without Me" in November 2018. That remix won the award for "Best Remix" at the International Dance Music Awards in March 2019.

=== 2019: Continued collaborations and Ascend ===
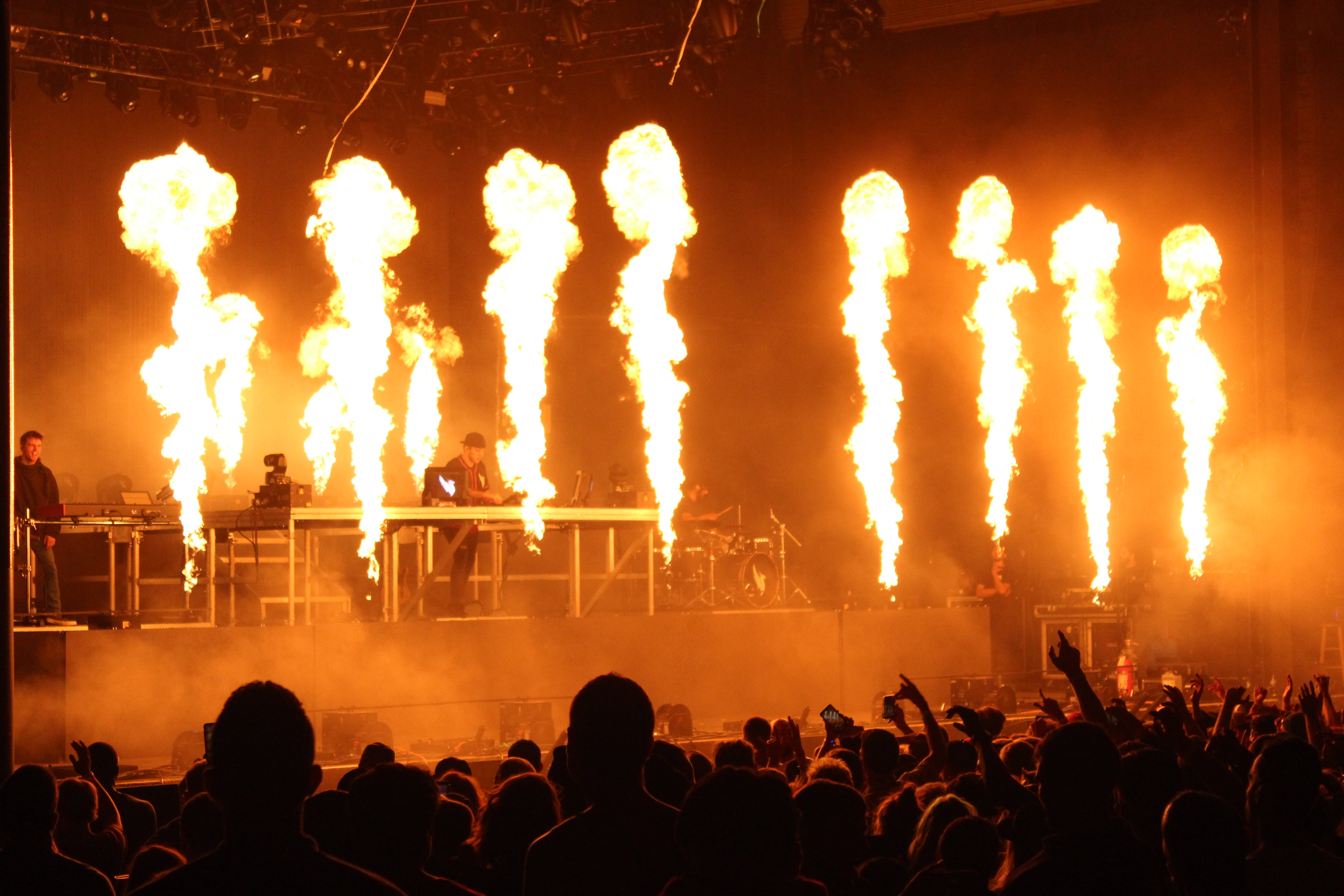
ILLENIUM On Tour

In January 2019, Illenium collaborated with electronic music duo, Bahari, on the track "Crashing". He followed that with a March 2019 collaboration with Kameron Alexander on the track "Pray". On March 31, 2019, EDM duo, The Chainsmokers, debuted a collaboration with Illenium ("Takeaway") during their set at the Ultra Music Festival. In May 2019, Illenium released a track with Jon Bellion called "Good Things Fall Apart". As of September 2019, both singles maintain Illenium's highest placement on the Hot Dance/Electronic Songs chart at number 3.

Later in May 2019, Illenium and Ekali debuted a collaborative track ("Hard to Say Goodbye") during a set at the Electric Daisy Carnival in Las Vegas. In June 2019, Illenium announced that his upcoming album, Ascend, would be released on August 16 through Astralwerks. He also announced a 30-city North American tour in support of the album. On July 24, 2019, after many months of playing at festivals, his collaboration with The Chainsmokers and Lennon Stella titled "Takeaway," along with the official music video, were officially released. The video garnered over 6 million views in the first 3 days after its release. "Takeaway" also quickly entered the top 10 on the US iTunes Sales Chart. On August 16, 2019, Illenium released his third studio album, Ascend, on Astralwerks. The album consists of 17 tracks, including the aforementioned "Take You Down", "Crashing," "Pray," "Good Things Fall Apart," and "Takeaway." The album became his first to reach number one on the Billboard Top Dance/Electronic Albums chart and also reached his highest peak on the Billboard 200 at number 14. In December 2019, Illenium was named in the Forbes 30 Under 30 2020 Music list.

=== 2020–2022: Fallen Embers ===
In the early months of 2020, Illenium released his second collaboration with Excision called "Feel Something", featuring I Prevail.

In late August, Illenium announced his debut at a new music label, 12Tone, and released his first single with the label a few weeks later, titled "Nightlight", the lead single from his upcoming fourth studio album Fallen Embers. In late October, Illenium released his second song on the 12Tone label called "Paper Thin" with Tom DeLonge and his band, Angels & Airwaves. On Christmas Day, Illenium released "Hearts On Fire" as part of a collaboration with Dabin.

On April 25, 2021, Illenium debuted three new singles during his live performance at the Ubbi Dubbi Music Festival. An unreleased collaboration with producers Slander and Krewella titled "Lay It Down" was the first to be debuted that night. A collaboration with Excision and Haliene called "In My Mind" was the next to be debuted during the performance. The song's official title was revealed originally by a tweet from Haliene. Finally, "Sideways" is a collaboration with fellow producer Nurko which also debuted that night and was released on May 6, 2021.

On May 14, 2021, it was revealed via a tweet from Illenium that Fallen Embers is scheduled to release on July 16, 2021.

During Said the Sky's set on May 29, 2021, at the Sunset Music Festival, Trevor Christensen debuted a new collaboration between him and Illenium called "Crazy Times" with vocals from Tim James (who also provided vocals for "Take You Down"). It was later confirmed by Illenium on Twitter that the song was the final product of a live stream he and Trevor conducted in 2020, and that it would appear on Fallen Embers.

On July 3, Illenium performed Trilogy at the Allegiant Stadium in Las Vegas as the venue's inaugural music concert, and online live with sets from his first three primary albums – Ashes, Awake, Ascend, and a preview of his fourth album, Fallen Embers, which he played four unreleased songs from the album.

On July 16, Illenium released his fourth album, Fallen Embers, with 14 songs, including the aforementioned singles "Nightlight", "Paper Thin", "Hearts on Fire", "First Time", "Sideways", "Heavenly Side". A remix of "Blame Myself" produced with Virtual Riot was released as part of the deluxe version of Fallen Embers on October 22, alongside several other unreleased collaborations. The album garnered Illenium his first Grammy Award nomination, in the category Best Dance/Electronic Album. It also has over 400 million streams on Spotify as of December 2021.

In December 2021, Illenium hosted the inaugural Ember Shores Festival in Cancún, Mexico. The event was sold out months in advance and featured acts like Big Gigantic, 3lau, Cosmic Gate, and others. A second edition of the event took place in December 2022, with acts like Dillon Francis, Said the Sky, and Nurko. The third Ember Shores Festival is due to take place in December 2023.

=== 2023–present: Illenium and Odyssey ===
On January 17, 2023, Illenium announced his self-titled fifth studio album, Illenium, which was released on April 28 and reached number 42 on the Billboard 200 chart. One single off the album, "Luv Me A Little" (featuring Nina Nesbitt), reached number 1 on the Billboard Dance/Mix Show Airplay chart. The album also featured the single "Eyes Wide Shut," a collaboration with Avril Lavigne and Travis Barker that reached number 9 on the Billboard Dance/Electronic Songs chart. Other guest appearances on the album included All Time Low, Teddy Swims, jxdn, Skylar Grey, Max, and others. In support of the album, Illenium embarked on the 37-date "ILLENIUM LIVE" tour in May 2023. The tour will have stops in North America, Europe, and Australia. The North American leg of the tour will have 27 shows, 13 of which will be held at open-air venues. On June 17, Illenium played a show dubbed "Trilogy: Colorado" at Denver's Empower Field at Mile High, a stadium with a capacity of over 76,000. It was his largest concert to date and the largest EDM headliner event in US history.

In April 2023, Illenium partnered with End Overdose, a non-profit organization that offers education on properly identifying drug-related overdoses and administering naloxone (a drug that reduces the effects of overdose). Volunteers from the organization will offer live training sessions at select stops on Illenium's 2023 tour.

On September 17, 2025, Illenium announced his sixth studio album Odyssey, along with a nine-show residency at the Sphere in Las Vegas to promote the album. It was released through Republic Records on February 6, 2026.

== Personal life ==
In 2012, Illenium suffered a heroin overdose; which he publicly talked about in 2018 and on his song "Take You Down", also released in 2018. He proposed to his long-time girlfriend Lara McWhorter on June 3, 2022. They married on October 2, 2023.

== Discography ==
- Ashes (2016)
- Awake (2017)
- Ascend (2019)
- Fallen Embers (2021)
- Illenium (2023)
- Odyssey (2026)

== Tours ==
- Ashes Tour (2016–2017)
- Awake Tour (2017–2018)
- Ascend Tour (2019–2020)
- Fallen Embers Tour (2021)
- Illenium Live Tour (2023)

== Awards and nominations ==
Illenium's awards and nominations
Organization	Year	Nominated work	Category	Result	Ref.
American Music Awards	2026	Himself	Best Dance/Electronic Artist	Pending	
Billboard Music Awards	2020	Ascend	Top Dance/Electronic Album	Nominated	
Billboard Music Awards	2020	Himself	Top Dance/Electronic Artist	Nominated	
Billboard Music Awards	2020	"Good Things Fall Apart"	Top Dance/Electronic Song	Nominated	
Billboard Music Awards	2022	Fallen Embers	Top Dance/Electronic Album	Won	
Billboard Music Awards	2023	Illenium	Top Dance/Electronic Album	Nominated	
DJ Mag's Top 100 DJs	2019	Himself	None	64th place	
DJ Mag's Top 100 DJs	2020	Himself	None	43rd place	
DJ Mag's Top 100 DJs	2026	Himself	None	30th place	
Electronic Music Awards	2017	"Say It" (Illenium Remix)	Remix of the Year	Won	
Electronic Dance Music Awards	2022	"Hearts on Fire" (with Dabin & Lights)	Dance/Electro Pop Song of The Year	Nominated	
Electronic Dance Music Awards	2022	"Hearts on Fire" (with Dabin & Lights)	Music Video of The Year	Won	
Electronic Dance Music Awards	2023	Himself	Producer Of The Year	Won	
Electronic Dance Music Awards	2023	"Don't Let Me Let Go" (with Dillon Francis & Evan Giia)	Best Collaboration	Nominated	
Electronic Dance Music Awards	2023	Illenials	Best Fan Army	Nominated	
Electronic Dance Music Awards	2024	Himself	Male Artist Of The Year	Nominated	
Electronic Dance Music Awards	2024	ILLENIUM	Album of the Year	Nominated	
Electronic Dance Music Awards	2024	"See You Again" (with The Chainsmokers & Carlie Hanson)	Best Collaboration	Nominated	
Electronic Dance Music Awards	2024	Illenials	Best Fan Army	Nominated	
Electronic Dance Music Awards	2024	"Luv Me A Little" [feat. Nina Nesbitt] (BONNIE X CLYDE Remix)	Best Down Tempo Turned Up	Won	
Electronic Dance Music Awards	2025	Himself	Male Artist Of The Year	Nominated	
Electronic Dance Music Awards	2025	"Not Even Love" (with Seven Lions & ÁSDÍS)	Best Collaboration	Nominated	
Electronic Dance Music Awards	2025	"Not Even Love" (with Seven Lions & ÁSDÍS)	Dance Radio Song Of The Year	Nominated	
Electronic Dance Music Awards	2025	Illenials	Best Fan Army	Nominated	
Electronic Dance Music Awards	2026	"Forever" (with Tom Grennan & Alna)	Best Collaboration	Nominated	
Electronic Dance Music Awards	2026	"Forever" (with Tom Grennan & Alna)	Pop-Dance Anthem of the Year	Won	
Electronic Dance Music Awards	2026	Illenium B2B Seven Lions (Ember Shores 2025, Cancun, MX)	Favorite B2B	Nominated	
Electronic Dance Music Awards	2026	Illenials	Best Fan Army	Nominated	
Forbes 30 Under 30	2020	Himself	30 Under 30	Included	
Grammy Awards	2022	Fallen Embers	Best Dance/Electronic Album	Nominated	
IHeartRadio Music Awards	2024	Himself	Dance Artist of the Year	Nominated	
IHeartRadio Music Awards	2026	"In My Arms" (with Hayla)	Dance Song of the Year	Nominated	
International Dance Music Awards	2019	Himself	Best Male Artist (Bass)	Won	
International Dance Music Awards	2019	"Without Me" (Illenium Remix)	Best Remix	Won	
International Dance Music Awards	2020	Ascend	Best Album	Nominated	
International Dance Music Awards	2020	Himself	Best Male Artist (Bass)	Nominated	
International Songwriting Competition	2017	"Crawl Outta Love"	None	Won	
International Songwriting Competition	2017	"Fractures"	Electronic Dance Music	Won	
