= Alison Wonderland discography =

Discography of Australian electronic dance artist Alison Wonderland

- Studio albums: 4
- EPs: 1
- Singles: 38

Australian electronic dance music producer, DJ and singer Alison Wonderland has released 4 studio albums and 1 extended play.

== Albums ==
=== Studio albums ===
List of studio albums, with selected chart positions
| Title | Details | Peak positions | | | | Certifications |
| Title | Details | AUS | NZ | US | US Dance | Certifications |
|---|---|---|---|---|---|---|
| Run | Released: 20 March 2015; Record label: EMI Music Australia | 6 | 12 | — | 1 | ARIA: Gold |
| Awake | Released: 6 April 2018; Record label: EMI Music Australia | 7 | 14 | 88 | 1 | |
| Loner | Released: 6 May 2022; Record label: EMI Music Australia | 9 | 15 | — | 3 | |
| Ghost World | Released: 5 December 2025; Record label: EMI Music Australia | 42 | — | — | 21 | |

== Extended plays ==
List of EPs, with selected details
| Title | Details |
|---|---|
| Calm Down | Released: 27 June 2014; Record label: EMI Music Australia |

== Singles ==
=== As lead artist ===
List of singles, with selected chart positions and certifications
| Title | Year | Peak positions | | | | Certification | Album |
| Title | Year | AUS | NZ Heat. | NZ Hot | US Dance | Certification | Album |
|---|---|---|---|---|---|---|---|
| "Get Ready" (featuring Fishing) | 2013 | — | — | — | — | | Non-album single |
| "I Want U" | 2014 | 38 | — | — | — | ARIA: Platinum; RMNZ: Platinum | Calm Down / Run |
| "Cold" | 2014 | — | — | — | — | | Calm Down / Run |
| "U Don't Know" (featuring Wayne Coyne) | 2015 | 63 | — | — | 29 | | Run |
| "Run" | 2015 | — | — | — | — | ARIA: Gold; RMNZ: Gold | Run |
| "Games" | 2015 | — | — | — | — | | Run |
| "Messiah" (with M-Phazes) | 2016 | — | — | — | — | | Non-album single |
| "Happy Place" | 2017 | — | — | — | — | | Awake |
| "Church" | 2018 | 54 | 5 | — | 35 | ARIA: Platinum; RMNZ: Gold | Awake |
| "No" | 2018 | — | 7 | — | 44 | | Awake |
| "High" (featuring Trippie Redd) | 2018 | — | — | — | 18 | | Awake |
| "Easy" | 2018 | — | 9 | — | — | | Awake |
| "Lost My Mind" (with Dillon Francis) | 2019 | — | — | — | 23 | | Non-album singles |
| "Peace" | 2019 | — | — | 18 | 33 | | Non-album singles |
| "Time" (with Quix) | 2019 | — | — | — | — | | Non-album singles |
| "W.W.C.B.D." (with Phem) | 2020 | — | — | — | — | | Non-album singles |
| "Bad Things" | 2020 | — | — | — | 34 | | Loner |
| "Anything" (with Valentino Khan) | 2020 | — | — | — | 35 | | Non-album single |
| "Fuck U Love U" | 2021 | — | — | — | 41 | | Loner |
| "Fear of Dying" | 2022 | — | — | 29 | 47 | | Loner |
| "New Day" | 2022 | — | — | 23 | 50 | | Loner |
| "Forever" | 2022 | — | — | 39 | — | | Loner |
| "Something Real" | 2022 | — | — | 32 | 31 | | Loner |
| "Down the Line" | 2022 | — | — | 33 | — | | Loner (vinyl edition) |
| "Picture" (with Slander and Said the Sky) | 2022 | — | — | 18 | 18 | | Non-album singles |
| "Fight of Flight" (with Memba) | 2023 | — | — | 40 | — | | Non-album singles |
| "Wake Up" (with QUIX) | 2023 | — | — | — | — | | Non-album singles |
| "Satellite" (with Dimension) | 2024 | — | — | — | — | | Non-album singles |
| "Get Started" | 2025 | — | — | 31 | — | | Ghost World |
| "Again? Fuck." | 2025 | — | — | — | — | | Ghost World |
| "iwannaliveinadream" | 2025 | — | — | — | — | | Ghost World |
| "Psycho" (with Erick the Architect, QUIX, Memba) | 2025 | — | — | — | — | | Ghost World |
| "XTC" (with Whyte Fang) | 2025 | — | — | — | — | | Ghost World |
| "Floating Away" | 2025 | — | — | — | — | | Ghost World |
| "Heaven" (with Ninajirachi) | 2025 | — | — | 20 | — | | Ghost World |
| "Keep Seeing Things" (with Memba) | 2026 | — | — | — | — | | Non-album singles |
| "Rescue U" (with WINK) | 2026 | — | — | — | — | | Non-album singles |
"—" denotes a recording that did not chart or was not released.

=== As featured artist ===
| Title | Year | Album |
|---|---|---|
| "Bummed" (Chet Porter featuring Alison Wonderland) | 2020 | Non-album single |

=== Guest appeareances ===
| Title | Year | Album |
|---|---|---|
| "Out Of Your Mind" The Presets featuring Alison Wonderland | 2018 | Hi Viz |

== As Whyte Fang ==
=== Studio Albums ===
| Title | Details |
|---|---|
| Genesis | Released: 14 April 2023; Record label: FMU Records |

=== Extended Plays ===
| Title | Details |
|---|---|
| The Version Suicides (with The Grates) | Released: 9 December 2011; Record label: Dew Process |

=== Singles ===
| Title | Year | Album |
|---|---|---|
| "Thy New Sound" | 2011 | Non-album single |
| "Say It Right" | 2011 | Non-album single |
| "Play" | 2011 | Non-album single |
| "Tides" | 2021 | Genesis |
| "333" | 2022 | Genesis |
| "24 HRS" | 2022 | Genesis |
| "Girl" | 2022 | Genesis |
| "Transport God" | 2023 | Genesis |
| "Scream" (featuring Erick The Architect) | 2023 | Genesis |
| "Genesis | 2023 | Genesis |
| "XTC" (with Alison Wonderland) | 2025 | Ghost World |

== Music videos ==
| Title | Year | Director(s) |
|---|---|---|
| "Get Ready" featuring Fishing | 2013 | Aidan Keogh |
| "I Want U" | 2014 | Prad Senanayake |
| "Lies" | 2014 | Tay Kaka |
| "Cold" | 2014 | Prad Senanayake |
| "U Don't Know" featuring Wayne Coyne | 2015 | Prad Senanayake |
| "Run" | 2015 | Tim K |
| "Take It To Reality" featuring SAFIA | 2015 | —N/a |
| "Games" | 2015 | Prad Senanayake |
| "Messiah" with M-Phazes | 2017 | Jason Bock |
| "Happy Place" | 2017 | Alison Wonderland |
| "Church" | 2018 | Bo Mirhosseni |
| "High" featuring Trippie Redd | 2018 | Jeffrey Zoss |
| "Easy" | 2018 | Bo Mirhosseni |
| "Peace" | 2019 | Gabe Fraboni |
| "Bad Things" | 2020 | Peter Don |
| "Anything" with Valentino Khan | 2021 | Marc Furmie |
| "Fear Of Dying" | 2022 | Brandon Dermer |
| "New Day" | 2022 | Peter Don |
| "Forever" | 2022 | Sam Kristofski |
| "Something Real" | 2022 | Tyler Lampe |
| "Down The Line" | 2022 | Prad Senanayake |
| "Wake Up" with QUIX | 2023 | —N/a |
| "Satellite" with Dimension | 2024 | —N/a |
| "Get Started" | 2025 | Connor Pritchard |
| "Again? Fuck" | 2025 | Connor Pritchard |
| "iwannaliveinadream" | 2025 | Connor Pritchard |
| "PSYCHO" with Erick the Architect, QUIX, and MEMBA | 2025 | Connor Pritchard |
| "XTC" with Whyte Fang | 2025 | Alison Wonderland |
| "Heaven" with Ninajirachi | 2025 | Connor Pritchard |

== Remixes ==
2012

- Ladyhawke: "Blue Eyes"
- 360: "Boys Like You"
- Little Dragon: "Shuffle a Dream"

2014

- Crooked Colours: "Come Down"

2015

- Duke Dumont: "Ocean Drive"
- Hermitude: "The Buzz"
- Justin Bieber: "What Do You Mean?"

2017

- Lido: "Crazy"
- Dua Lipa: "New Rules"

2026

- Slayyyter: Crank
