= 2026 Electronic Dance Music Awards =

American music awards

- Awarded for: excellence on the EDM scene
- Date: March 27, 2026
- Venue: Clevelander, South Beach
- Country: United States
- Hosted by: Erin Webster
- Website: edmawardsmiami.com

The 2026 Electronic Dance Music Awards (also known as EDMAs) took place on March 27, 2026, at the Clevelander staple on South Beach ahead of Ultra Music Festival during the height of Miami Music Week.

The event, once again will count with iHeart Media for their extensive coverage, and Erin Webster is set to return as the ceremony host. The awards will celebrate the best songs, artists, and festivals from the global electronic dance music scene of 2025, chosen by the public on EDMAs official website.

== Performers ==
List of performers were announced on March 20, 2026.

- Armin van Buuren
- Don Diablo
- Benny Benassi
- Alan Walker
- Laidback Luke
- Bonnie x Clyde
- Sickick
- DJ Neurotic

== Winners and nominees ==
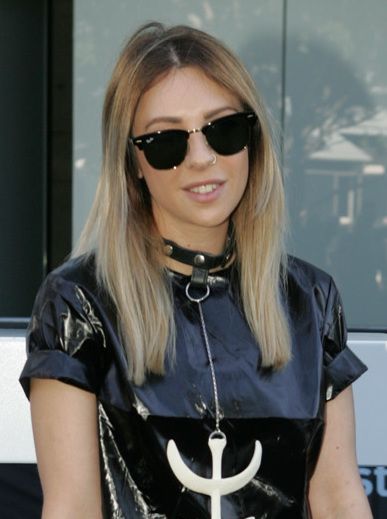
Female Artist of the Year Winner, Alison Wonderland

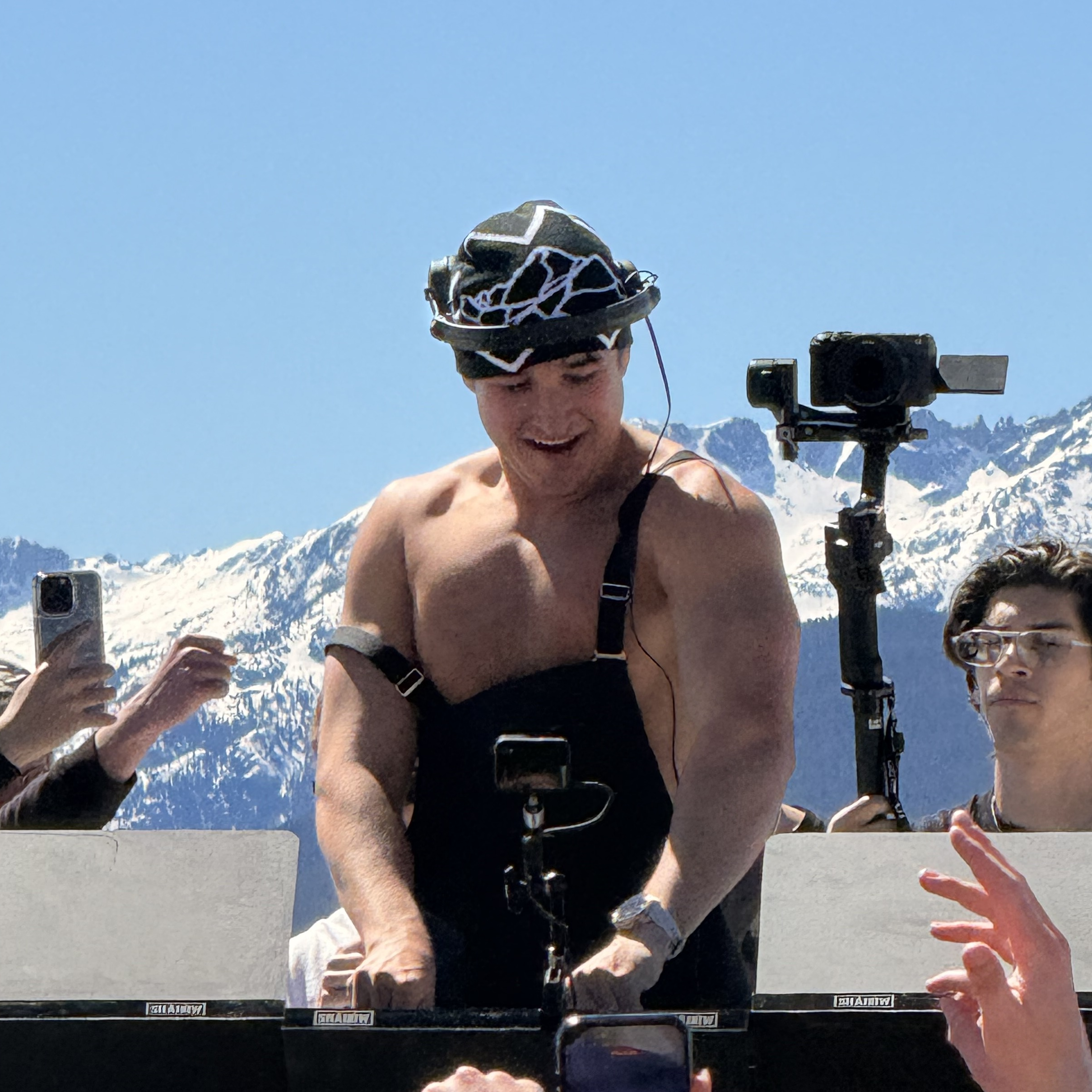
Male Artist of the Year Winner, John Summit

Vocalist of the Year Winner, Zara Larsson

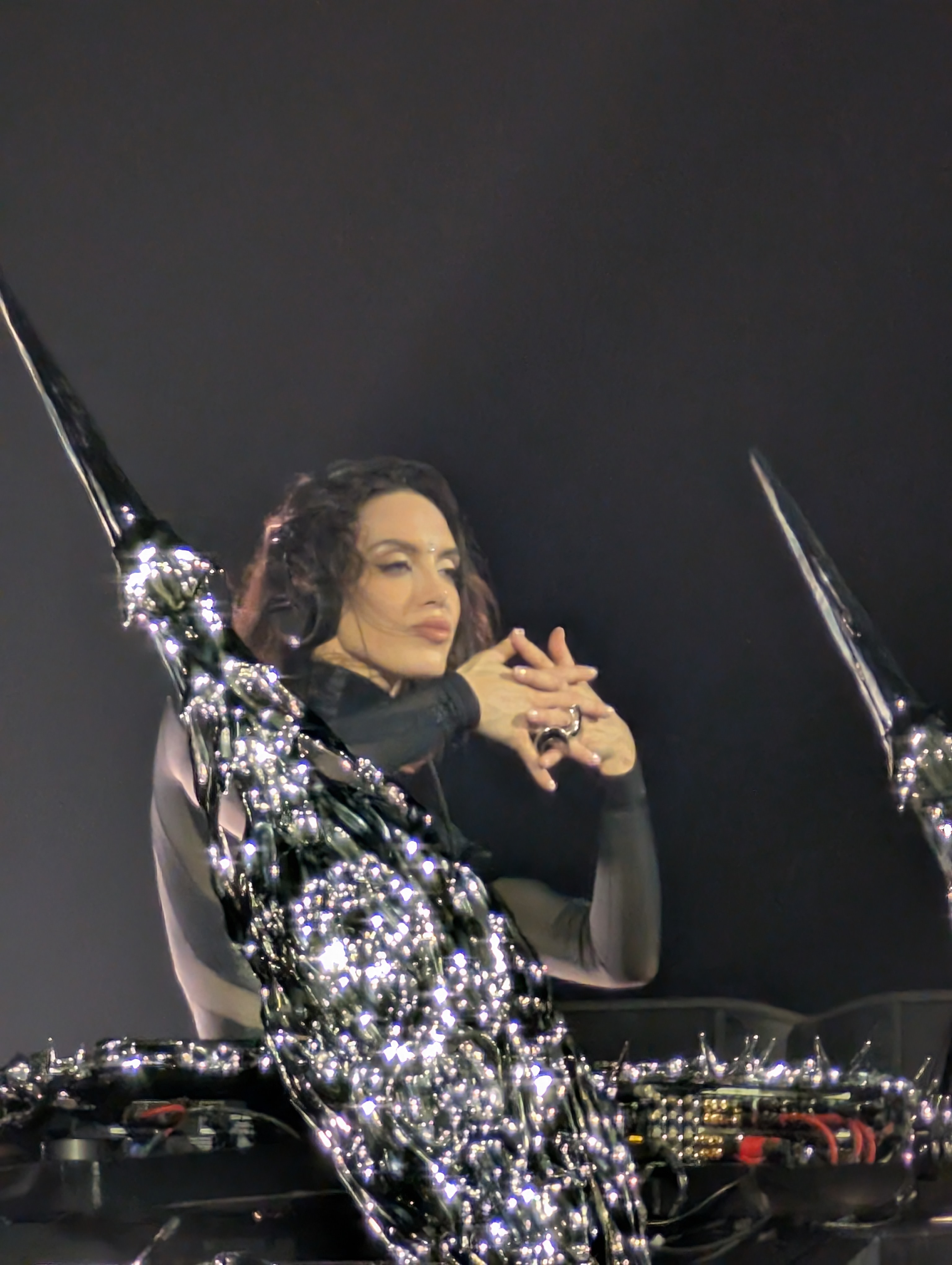
Vanguard Award recipient, Sara Landry

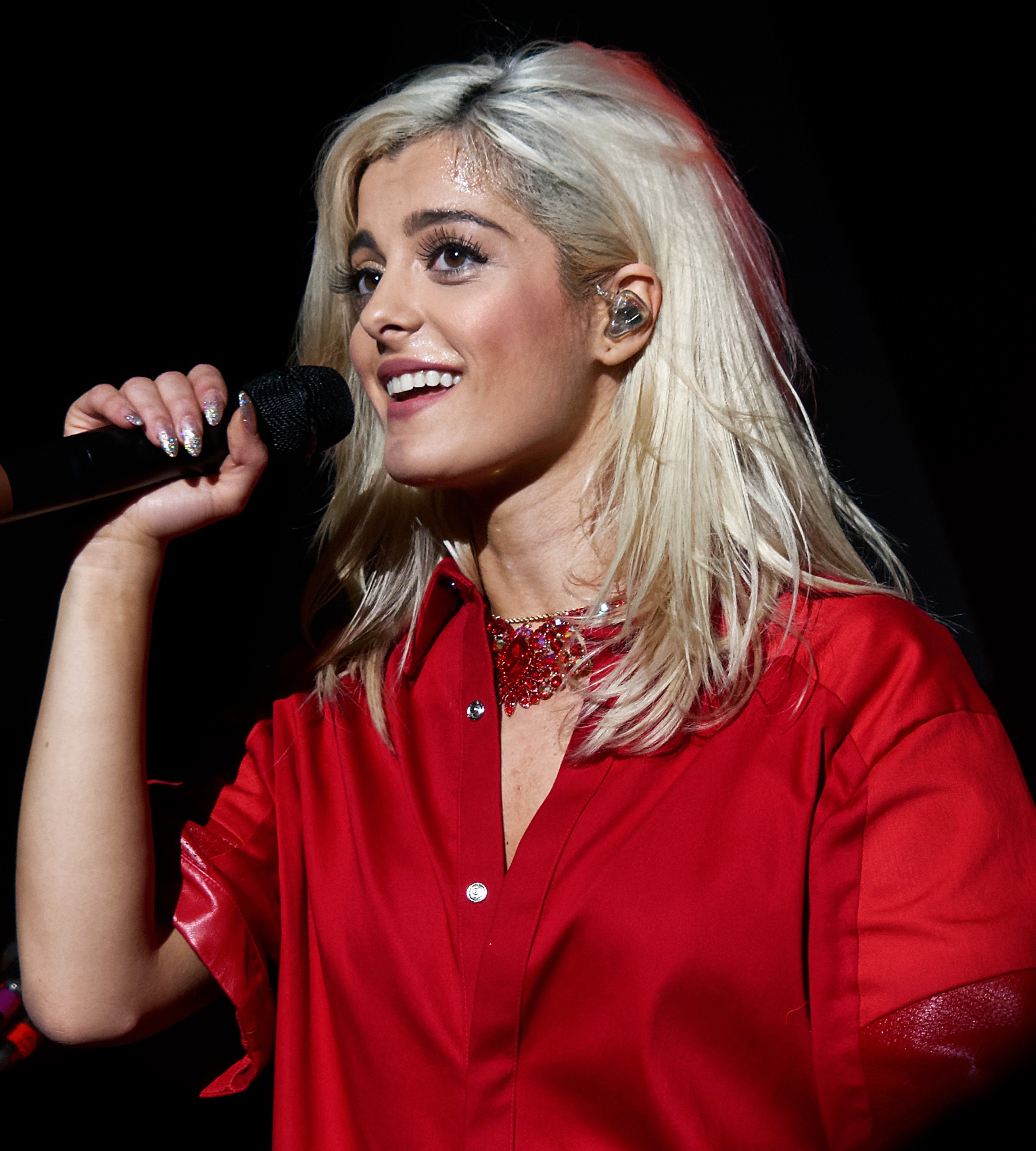
Female Icon Award recipient, Bebe Rexha

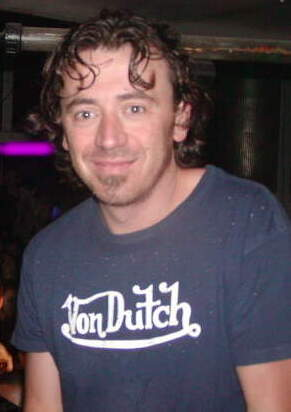
Male Icon Award recipient, Benny Benassi

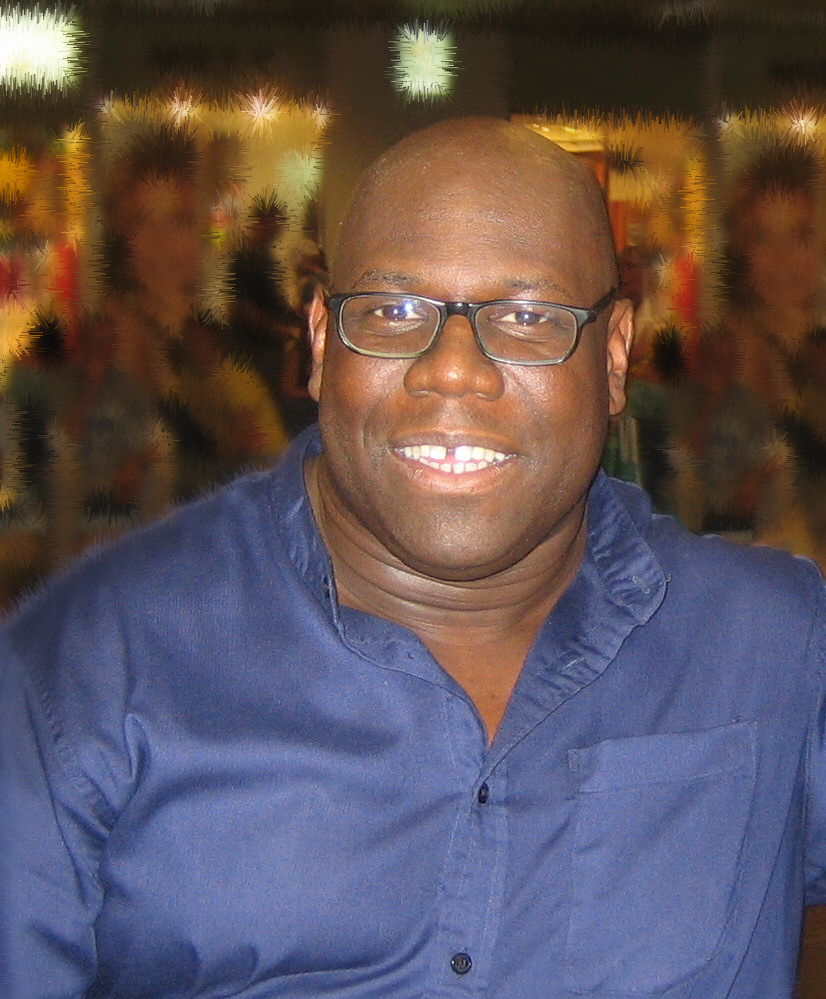
Legend Award recipient, Carl Cox

The full list of nominees for the 2026 EDMAs were announced on February 23, 2026: Winners were announced on March 23.

=== General ===
Male Artist Of The Year	Female Artist Of The Year	Vocalist Of The Year
John Summit; Subtronics; David Guetta; Dom Dolla; Anyma; Disco Lines; Diplo; Sub Focus; Cloonee	Alison Wonderland; REZZ; HALIENE; Daya; HAYLA; CloZee; Amelie Lens; Kaleena Zanders; Miss Monique; LP Giobbi; Nora En Pure; Anabel Englund	Zara Larsson; HAYLA; Linney; Becky Hill; Daya; Oaks; Aloe Blacc; Clementine Douglas; Aluna; Abi Flynn; Hayley May; Kah-lo
Music Video Of The Year	Producer Of The Year	Best Collaboration
"Too Late" (featuring Ryan Violet) — The BreakBomb Project; "MAD" — Martin Garrix, Lauv; "Lay It On Me" — Frank Walker, Josh Ross, Norma Jean Martine; "Dreamin'" (featuring Daya) — Dom Dolla; "Tonight" — PinkPantheress; "Midnight Sun" — Zara Larsson; "Hi!" — Madeon; "PSYCHO" — Alison Wonderland, Erick the Architect, QUIX, MEMBA; "F*ck My Computer" — Ninajirachi	Max Styler; Tiësto; ARTBAT; Skrillex; Anyma; REZZ; Charlotte de Witte; Knock2; Cassian; Diplo; Martin Garrix; Hugel	"Sleepless Nights" — Armin van Buuren, Martin Garrix, Libby Whitehouse; "TYPE SH*T" — Crankdat, NGHTMRE, Duke Deuce; "Welcome to Lonely Club" — Alan Walker, Steve Aoki, Lonely Club; "Forever" — Illenium, Tom Grennan, Alna; "Our Time" — Afrojack, Martin Garrix, David Guetta, Amél; "Hypnotized" — Anyma, Ellie Goulding; "Faded" — HAYLA, Nelly Furtado; "Surrender" — Alesso, Becky Hill; "Save My Love" — Marshmello, Ellie Goulding, AVAION; "In My Head" — Gryffin, Kaskade, Nu-La; "Think Of Me" — Hugel, David Guetta, Kehlani, Daecolm; "Bring The House Down" — DJ Snake, Dillon Francis, TRXGGX
Favorite Album	Favorite Group	
Seven Lions — Asleep in the Garden of Infernal Stars; Audien — First Love; Alan Walker — Quantum Beats; Alison Wonderland — GHOST WORLD; Cheat Codes – Future Renaissance; Chris Lake — Chemistry; NGHTMRE — MINDFULL; Said the Sky — Closer to the Sun; DJ Snake — Nomad; Sub Focus — Contact; Subtronics — Fibonacci; REZZ — As the Pendulum Swings	Major Lazer; MEDUZA; BONNIE X CLYDE; Loud Luxury; Two Friends; Louis The Child; TWINSICK; Levity; Łaszewo; Cheat Codes; SOFI TUKKER; The Chainsmokers	
Best New Artist	Breakout Artist of the Year	Breakout Remixer of the Year
AVELLO; Know Good; LYNY; Okayval; Ely Oaks; Luke Alexander; Arodes; Ninajirachi; Sungyoo; Maesic; Drove; Franc Fala	LEVEL UP; Zara Larsson; Alleycvt; Crankdat; Odd Mob; Jazzy; Sidepiece; CID; Disco Lines; Layton Giordani; Kettama; Cyril	AVELLO; Luke Alexander; BARTS; CHALANT; Hills; LES BISOUS
Best Radio Show	Best Fan Army	
"Hardwell On Air" — Hardwell; "Desire Radio" — Joel Corry; "HEXAGON Radio" — Don Diablo; "The Martin Garrix Show" — Martin Garrix; "JACKED Radio" — Afrojack; "Purified Radio" — Nora En Pure; "In The MOOD" — Nicole Moudaber; "Golden Era Radio" — Frank Walker; "I Am House Radio" — Crystal Waters	Alan Walker — [Walkers]; ILLENIUM — [Illenials]; deadmau5 — [The Horde]; Martin Garrix — [Garrixers]; Excision — [Headbangers]; Marshmello — [Mellogang]; Subtronics — [CYCLOPS ARMY]; Hardwell — [Hardwellers]; Seven Lions — [CODEX LEONIS]	
Male Icon Award	Female Icon Award	Vanguard Award
Benny Benassi	Bebe Rexha	Sara Landry
Legend Award
Carl Cox

=== Dance ===
Dance Song Of The Year	Dance Radio Song Of The Year
"La Noche" — Chris Lake, Skrillex, ANITA B QUEEN (TIE); "In My Head" (feat. Nu-La) — Gryffin, Kaskade (TIE); "Inside Our Hearts" — Martin Garrix, Alesso, Shaun Farrugia; "Our Time" — Afrojack, Martin Garrix, David Guetta, Amél; "I Follow Rivers" (feat. Oaks) — Tiësto; "Fancy $hit" — CID, Taylr Renee	"No Broke Boys" — Disco Lines, Tinashe; "Part of Me" — Armin van Buuren, Louis III; "Save My Love" — Marshmello, Ellie Goulding, AVAION; "Wait So Long" — Swedish House Mafia; "Won't Be Possible" — Tiësto, Odd Mob, Goodboys; "The Less I Know The Better" — Mau P; "Don’t Wake Me Up" — James Hype; "I Follow Rivers" (feat. Oaks) — Tiësto; "Never Walk Alone" — BLOND:ISH & Stevie Appleton
Dance Radio Artist of the Year	Dance / Electro Pop Song of the Year
Martin Garrix; Dom Dolla; Mau P; Calvin Harris; Tiësto; HAYLA; David Guetta; Kaskade; D.O.D; Hugel; Anabel Englund; Will Sass	"Move A Little Closer" — DVBBS, Abi Flynn; "crystallized" (feat. Inéz) — John Summit; "Inside Our Hearts" — Martin Garrix, Alesso, Shaun Farrugia; "MAD" — Martin Garrix, Lauv; "Hypnotized" (feat. Ellie Goulding) — Anyma; "Super Powers" (with Oaks) — TELYKAST; "Blessings" — Calvin Harris, Clementine Douglas; "Surrender" — Alesso, Becky Hill; "Black Out Days" — Ian Asher, Phantogram; "UH OH!" — Loud Luxury; "Smooth" — The Chainsmokers; "All I Know" — Rudimental, Khalid
Pop-Dance Anthem of the Year
"Forever" — Illenium, Tom Grennan, Alna; "Crush" — Zara Larsson; "MAD" — Martin Garrix, Lauv; "Wait So Long" — Swedish House Mafia; "Illegal" — PinkPantheress; "Destiny" — Alesso, Sacha; "Hey Son" — Sam Feldt, MC4D, VIZE, Aloe Blacc; "Move a Little Closer" — Dvbbs, Abi Flynn; "Superstar" (feat. Bryce Vine) — XANDRA

=== Techno / House / Afro ===
Tech House Artist Of The Year	Techno Song Of The Year	Afro House Song Of The Year
Cloonee; Mau P; Dom Dolla; Chris Lake; Sidepiece; Fisher; J. Worra; Max Styler; Beltran; Biscits; Tita Lau; NIIKO X SWAE	"Late At Night" — Lilly Palmer, Maddix; "One Mind" — Charlotte de Witte, Amelie Lens; "GIRLBOSS" — Sara Landry; "Desolate Lands" — Adam Beyer, Chris Avantgarde; "Eyes On Me" — Nicole Moudaber, Space 92; "Love is Gonna Save Us" — ARTBAT, Benny Benassi; "Crush" — Indira Paganotto; "Red In The Desert" — Boris Brejcha, Poppy Baskcomb; "Girls Go Freak" — Maddix, Reinier Zonneveld, Sarah de Warren	"Fire Fire" — Shimza, AR/CO, Kasango; "Think Of Me" — Hugel, David Guetta, Kehlani, Daecolm; "Life is Simple (Move Your Body)" [feat. Salomé Das] — Maesic, Marshall Jefferson; "Come With Me" (feat. Jorja Smith) — Major League Djz; "Jamaican (BAM BAM)" — HUGEL, SOLTO; "Ma Tnsani (Yalla Habibi)" — Vanco, AYA; "unfazed" — A Gira; "Positions" — Stryv, Malachiii, Adam Port; "You Go" (feat. Sebastian Rivero) — Sparrow & Barbossa
Tech House Song Of The Year	House Song Of The Year	Afro House Remix of the Year
"Dreamin'" (feat. Daya) — Dom Dolla; "How Deep Are Your Dreams?" — Cloonee; "System" — Odd Mob, OMNOM, HYPERBEAM; "I Know You Want To" — Max Styler; "Bullshit" — Matroda, KLP; "Double Dutch" (Hollywood pick) — Walker & Royce, Kyle Watson; "Toxic" — Chris Lake, Ragie Ban; "Mind Games" — Discip; "Apple Cider" — ACRAZE, Westend	"Act of God" (feat. Linney, Sarah de Warren) — Layton Giordani; "Edge of Desire" — Jonas Blue, Malive; "LA NOCHE" — Chris Lake, Skrillex, ANITA B QUEEN; "Appetite" — Chris Lorenzo; "Make Me Feel" — oskar med k; "Dior" — MK, Chrystal; "All This Time" — Sonny Fodera, Jazzy; "Waterfalls" (feat. Sam Harper, Bobby Harvey) — James Hype; "tell you straight" — jigitz	"Watch The Sunrise" (TEDDY-O Remix) — Axwell feat. Steve Edwards; "Let’s Go" (Hugel Remix) — Jaden Bojsen, David Guetta feat. Tom Enzy, Juany Bravo & Sami Brielle; "Bad Dreams" (Hugel Remix) — Teddy Swims; "Music Sounds Better With You" (Heliograph & CVLAM Remix) — Stardust; "Birthday Sex" (Levi Remix) — Jeremih; "Dame Un Grrr" (Provi Remix) — Kate Linn, Fantomel

=== Dubstep / Trance / Drum and Bass ===
Dubstep Artist of the Year	Dubstep / Bass-Heavy Song of the Year
Crankdat; Excision; NGHTMRE; LEVEL UP; DJ Diesel; Mersiv; Zeds Dead; GRiZ; Jessica Audiffred; Virtual Riot; Levity; SLANDER	Subtronics – Friends (feat. Linney); Zeds Dead – One Of These Mornings; Skrillex – VOLTAGE; Eptic & LYNY – Light Up; NGHTMRE, Blanke – Mind Full; Kai Wachi, LEVEL UP – OUT OF MY MIND; LYNY – Section; Crankdat, NGHTMRE – Type Shit; GRiZ, Wooli – Chaos Theory
Trance Song of the Year	DnB (Drum and Bass) Song of the Year
Armin van Buuren, SACHA – Set Me Free; Above & Beyond – Start A Fire (feat. Richard Bedford); Cosmic Gate – Never Erase You; KI/KI – What’s a Girl to Do in ’25; KSHMR, nilsix, Ryos – Radiate (feat. Hayley May); Ben Hemsley – Angel	"On & On" — Sub Focus, bbyclose; "Pum Pum" — Dimitri Vegas, David Guetta, Loreen; "Light That Leads Me" — Netsky, Bebe Rexha; "Maniac" — Don Diablo presents: Control Alt Delete; "Born To Fly" — Anabel Englund & Mary Droppinz; "Archangel" — Pendulum; "Rowdy (BLAOW!)" — Hedex, Eksman; "All I Know" — Rudimental, Khalid; "Give Up the Ghost" — Modestep

=== DJ / Club ===
Club DJ of The Year	Favorite Club Track
Gordo; Steve Aoki; James Hype; Disco Lines; AFROJACK; Diplo; Cloonee; Max Styler; BLOND:ISH; Black Coffee; Austin Millz; Laidback Luke	"Cash Out" — SIDEPIECE, Bobby Shmurda; "WORK" — Proppa, Rich DietZ, Smith & Sorren; "Girls MIA" (featuring Carly Gibert) — Anyma, Adam Sellouk; "Ten Out Of Ten" (featuring ROU) — R3HAB; "Globo" (featuring Blessd & Kofia) — Gordo; "No Sleep" — MEDUZA; "Bring The House Down" — DJ Snake, Dillon Francis, TRXGGX; "Nomacita" — Miss Monique, GENESI, Carl Bee; "Coke Diet" — Fallon
Favorite Nightclub Residency (U.S.)	Mixshow DJ Of The Year (Top 40 / Dance)
E11EVEN | Miami; Space | Miami; OMNIA | Las Vegas; Hakkasan | Las Vegas; HQ2 | Atlantic City; Level 8 | Los Angeles; Marquee | New York; The Summer Club | New York; Temple | Denver; SILO | Dallas	Vinny Vibe | Pitbull’s Globalization | SXM; DJ GQ | Y100 | Miami; Bodega Brad | 103.5 KTU | New York; DJ Nurotic | 103.5 Kiss FM | Chicago; DJ Ghost | Q102 | Philadelphia; DJ INZO | 106.1 KISS FM | Dallas; DJ Prostyle | 103.5 KTU | New York; DJ Oreo | 106.9 KHits | Tulsa; DJ Marc Thrasher | Channel 933 | San Diego; DJ Triple XL | 102.7 KIIS-FM | Los Angeles; DJ Skillz | KC101 | New Haven; DJ Ecto-1 | Insomniac Radio | GHR

=== Mashup / Remix ===
Best Use of Sample	Mashup Artist Of The Year
"The Less I Know The Better" — Mau P; "The Final Countdown 2025" — David Guetta, Hypaton & Europe; "Dirty Cash" (Money Talks) — PAWSA, The Adventures of Stevie V; "A New Day" — Sebastian Ingrosso featuring Céline Dion; "Toxic" — Chris Lake & Ragie Ban; "Diet Coke" — Fallon	Sickick; Dave Summer; DJs From Mars; Switch Disco; Rudeejays & Da Broz; WeDamnz
Remix Of The Year	Remixer Of The Year
"No Broke Boys" (AVELLO Remix) — Disco Lines, Tinashe; "tephanie" (HNTR Remix) — Cloonee, Young M.A, InntRaw; "The Days" (NOTION Remix) — Chrystal; "Dreamin'" (Anyma Remix) — Dom Dolla feat. Daya; "Sweet Nothing" (D.O.D 2025 Remix) — Calvin Harris featuring Florence Welch; "In the Moment" (Adriatique Remix) — RÜFÜS DU SOL	Wuki; James Hype; BLOND:ISH; HNTR; Hypaton; Anyma
Reimagined Song of the Year	Remix Rewind
"Everytime We Touch" — Steve Aoki, Cascada; "Love Parade" — Cassian; "Cry For You" — SIDEPIECE; "Get Right" — Joel Corry, Jennifer Lopez; "Life Is Simple (Move Your Body)" — Maestic & Marshall Jefferson; "How I Feel (Am I Wrong)" — Faul & Wad, Nico & Vinz, ALTEGO	"Sweet Caroline" (Two Friends Remix) — Neil Diamond; "Silence" (John Summit Remix) — Delerium, Sarah McLachlan; "Alive" (Alok Remix) — Empire Of The Sun; "At Night" (Anyma & Layton Giordani Remix) — Shakedown; "Stacy’s Mom" (BVRNOUT & Deerock Remix) — Fountains Of Wayne; "I Took A Pill In Ibiza" (BONNIE X CLYDE Remix) — Mike Posner
Radio Remixer Of The Year	YEEDM Remix of the Year
Martial Simon; Dj Dark; BVRNOUT; J Bruus; Kue; 5 Hours	"What I Want" (Disco Fries Remix) — Morgan Wallen, Tate McRae; "Happen To Me" (Steve Aoki Remix) — Russell Dickerson; "Easy To Love" (Moonlight Remix) — Dustin Lynch; "House Party" (BVRNOUT Remix) — Sam Hunt; "Thinking ‘Bout You" (MC4D Remix) — Dustin Lynch, MacKenzie Porter; "Not At This Party" (David Guetta Remix) — Dasha

=== Festivals ===
Main Stage/Festival Song of the Year	Best Performance
"Euphoria" (with Alok) — Armin van Buuren; "Won't Be Possible" — Tiësto, Odd Mob & Goodboys; "Cash Out" — SIDEPIECE, Bobby Shmurda; "Brace For Impact" (featuring Lil Jon) — Hardwell, Sub Zero Project; "light years" (featuring Inéz) — John Summit; "PSYCHO" — Alison Wonderland, Erick the Architect, QUIX, MEMBA; "Late At Night" — Lilly Palmer, Maddix; "Pretender" — KSHMR, Sam Feldt; "B2U" — Dillon Francis, Marten Hørger	Don Diablo | UNTOLD Festival | Romania | 2025; AFROJACK, David Guetta & Sia | Ultra Music Festival | Miami | 2025; Alan Walker | Tomorrowland | Belgium | 2025; deadmau5 | Red Rocks Amphitheater | Colorado | 2025; Anyma | Sphere | Las Vegas | 2025; John Summit | Experts Only Festival | New York | 2025; Nicky Romero | Tomorrowland | Belgium | 2025; Zedd, LA Philharmonic Orchestra | Coachella | California | 2025; Madeon | Countdown NYE 2025 | Los Angeles | 2025
Favorite B2B
Deadmau5 B2B Pendulum | Ultra Music Festival 2025 | Miami, FL; ILLENIUM B2B Seven Lions | Ember Shores 2025 | Cancun, MX; Leveltronics | EDC Orlando 2025 | Tinker Field, Orlando, FL; Levity B2B Crankdat B2B Tape B | Electric Forest 2025 | Rothbury, MI; John Summit B2B Dom Dolla | Ultra Music Festival 2025 | Miami, FL; Fisher B2B Chris Lake | Omnia Las Vegas 2025 | Las Vegas, NV; Kaskade B2B Cassian | Experts Only Festival 2025 | New York, NY; Skrillex B2B ISOxo | Niteharts | San Diego, CA; Martin Garrix B2B Alesso | Red Rocks | Morrison, CO

== Most nominations ==
The following individuals received four or more nominations:

9 nominations

- Martin Garrix

6 nominations

- Tiesto
- David Guetta

5 nominations

- Hugel
- Anyma

4 nominations

- Ellie Goulding
- Illenium
- HAYLA
- Cloonee
- Zara Larsson
- Disco Lines
- NGHTMRE
- John Summit
- Alan Walker
