= Calm Down =

Calm Down may refer to:

- Calm Down (EP), 2014 EP by Alison Wonderland
- "Calm Down" (Killing Heidi song), 2004
- "Calm Down" (Psapp song), 2004
- "Calm Down" (Busta Rhymes song), 2014
- "Calm Down" (Rema song), 2022
- "Calm Down", a song by All Time Low from Tell Me I'm Alive, 2023
