= Run (Alison Wonderland album) =

Studio album by Alison Wonderland
- Released: 20 March 2015
- Recorded: 2014–2015
- Genre: EDM; electropop; future bass
- Length: 42:57
- Label: EMI
- Producer: Alexandra Scholler; Djemba Djemba; Lido; Slumberjack; Goodnight Cody; AWE

Alison Wonderland chronology
Calm Down (2014)	Run (2015)	Awake (2018)

Singles from Run
- 1. "U Don't Know" Released: 11 February 2015; 2. "Run" Released: 11 June 2015; 3. "Games" Released: 9 September 2015

Run is the debut studio album from Australian electronic DJ and producer Alison Wonderland. It was released on 20 March 2015 via EMI Music Australia. The album features 3 singles; "U Don't Know" featuring Wayne Coyne, "Run" and "Games". A deluxe edition of the album featuring remixes of the four singles and her debut single "Get Ready", was released on 30 October 2015.

At the J Awards of 2015, the album was nominated for Australian Album of the Year.

== Promotion ==
Alison Wonderland toured North America in 2015, including a set at Coachella.

The Hermitude remix of "Games" and the Dre Skull remix of "Games" which features Konshens were released as promotional singles for the album. In addition, "Run" appears on the soundtrack for the 2015 reboot of Need for Speed. During a string of interviews that occurred in March and April 2015 as part of promotion for Run, Wonderland said to The Vine that the final track on the standard edition of the album titled "Already Gone" featuring Brave and Lido could not be remixed due to co-producer Lido losing the project files and only having an MP3 for Wonderland to record her vocals over.

== Singles ==
"U Don't Know" was released as the first single from Run and features Wayne Coyne from The Flaming Lips. The music video was released on 11 February 2015 which Co-Stars Christopher Mintz-Plasse. "Run", the title track of the album, was released as the second single on 11 June 2015. It was accompanied by a music video uploaded on the same day. The third and final single "Games" was released on 9 September 2015 which was accompanied with a one-take music video on the same day. A remix of "Games" by Hermitude was released for promotional purposes.

The two singles "I Want U" and "Cold" from her 2014 debut extended play Calm Down were included on the album.

While not released as an official single, a video for "Take It to Reality" featuring Safia was released in August 2015.

== Critical reception ==
Professional ratings
Review scores
Source	Rating
AllMusic	4/5 stars
The Music	4/5 stars
The Sydney Morning Herald	3/4 stars

Run received generally positive reviews from critics. Dylan Stewart from The Music gave Run 4 out of 5 stars, stating; "Alison Wonderland's take on the modern electro genre throws any concept of subtlety out the window, a blessing considering the washed-out pretence with which some of her contemporaries (BANKS, Grimes, Sky Ferreira) flirt." Another positive review was given by Krystal Spence from YourEDM stating "Not all the tracks on Run could be technically classified as trap, but there are definitely a few that standout for their production value. "I Want U" has a dreamy intro that goes well with her falsetto signing before a much harder drop. There's also "Naked" with Slumberjack, which provides great contrast against her voice as well." She also said that; "Alison Wonderland proves her ability to diversify, that she's not just a one-trick pony. She has talent, lots of talent. Overall, Run is a smart debut album, capable of casting a big enough net to grow Alison Wonderland's fan base exponentially over the next few months."

In a more negative review, Everett True of The Guardian gave Run 1 out of 5 stars, stating "There's little funk, no real purpose.' as well as ' There are no dynamics, or very few. Just a load of EDM signifiers and tropes spiralling around in need of a hook." He complimented "I Want U" for its moments of bass pounding, but countered the compliment by saying the vocals are lacking.

== Track listing ==
^{[a]} refers to a remixer

Digital download / CD version
No.	Title	Writer(s)	Producer(s)	Length
1.	"Run"	Alexandra Sholler, Andrew Swanson, Zachary Urman, Hayden Luby	Alexandra Sholler, Djemba Djemba, AWE	3:38
2.	"U Don't Know" (featuring Wayne Coyne)	Sholler, Swanson, Alexander Burnett, Mike Parvizi	Sholler, Djemba Djemba	4:03
3.	"Take It to Reality" (featuring Safia)	Sholler, Swanson, Urman, Burnett	Sholler, Djemba Djemba, AWE	3:52
4.	"Naked" (with Slumberjack)	Sholler, Fletcher Ehlers, Yee Sheng Then	Sholler, Slumberjack	3:17
5.	"Carry On" (featuring Johnny Nelson and GANZ)	Sholler, Johnny Nelson, Jordy Saämena, Brendan Picchio	Sholler, GANZ	4:01
6.	"I Want U"	Sholler, Swanson	Sholler, Djemba Djemba	3:29
7.	"Games"	Sholler, Swanson, Cody Farwell	Sholler, Djemba Djemba, Goodnight Cody	3:35
8.	"One More Hit"	Sholler, Swanson	Sholler, Djemba Djemba	3:22
9.	"Ignore"	Sholler, Urman	Sholler, AWE	3:54
10.	"Back It Up" (with AWE)	Sholler, Urman	Sholler, AWE	2:13
11.	"Cold"	Sholler, Peder Losnegård	Sholler, Lido	3:32
12.	"Already Gone" (featuring Brave and Lido)	Sholler, Maia Witika, Losnegård, Burnett, Picchio	Sholler, Lido	4:01
Total length:				42:57

Deluxe edition remixes
No.	Title	Writer(s)	Producer(s)	Length
13.	"U Don't Know" (featuring Wayne Coyne) (SLANDER Remix)	Sholler, Swanson, Burnett, Parvizi	Sholler, Djemba Djemba, SLANDER^{[a]}	4:54
14.	"U Don't Know" (featuring Wayne Coyne) (Vincent Remix)	Sholler, Swanson, Burnett, Parvizi	Sholler, Djemba Djemba, Vincent^{[a]}	3:37
15.	"I Want U" (GANZ Flip)	Sholler, Swanson	Sholler, Djemba Djemba, GANZ^{[a]}	4:12
16.	"I Want U" (DJ Hoodboi Remix)	Sholler, Swanson	Sholler, Djemba Djemba, DJ Hoodboi^{[a]}	3:42
17.	"Games" (Hermitude Remix)	Sholler, Swanson, Farwell	Sholler, Djemba Djemba, Goodnight Cody, Hermitude^{[a]}	3:18
18.	"Games" (Jimmy Edgar Remix)	Sholler, Swanson, Farwell	Sholler, Djemba Djemba, Goodnight Cody, Jimmy Edgar^{[a]}	4:53
19.	"Games" (featuring Konshens) (Dre Skull Remix)	Sholler, Garfield Spence, Swanson, Farwell, Andrew Hershey^{[a]}	Sholler, Djemba Djemba, Goodnight Cody, Dre Skull^{[a]}	3:29
20.	"Run" (Jayceeoh & B-Sides Remix)	Sholler, Swanson, Urman, Luby	Sholler, Djemba Djemba, AWE, Jayceeoh^{[a]}, B-Sides^{[a]}	3:48
21.	"Run" (Sinden Remix)	Sholler, Swanson, Urman, Luby	Sholler, Djemba Djemba, AWE, Sinden^{[a]}	6:06
22.	"Take It to Reality" (featuring SAFIA) (Justin Jay Remix)	Sholler, Swanson, Burnett, Urman	Sholler, Djemba Djemba, AWE, Justin Jay^{[a]}	6:48
23.	"Take It to Reality" (featuring SAFIA) (Ritual Remix)	Sholler, Swanson, Burnett, Urman	Sholler, Djemba Djemba, AWE, Ritual^{[a]}	3:28
24.	"Get Ready" (featuring Fishing) (Tasker (producer) & Leaderboy Remix)	Sholler, Russell Fitzgibbon, Brendan Piccio, Douglas Wright	Sholler, Brendan Piccio, Chris Colonna, Tasker (producer)^{[a]}, Leaderboy^{[a]}	3:01
Total length:				94:13

== Charts ==
=== Weekly charts ===
Chart (2015)	Peak position
Australian Albums (ARIA)	6
Australian Dance Albums (ARIA)	1
New Zealand Albums (RMNZ)	12
US Top Dance Albums (Billboard)	1

=== Year-end charts ===
Chart (2015)	Position
Australian Albums (ARIA)	72

== Certifications ==
Region	Certification	Certified units/sales
Australia (ARIA)	Gold	35,000^{‡}
^{‡} Sales+streaming figures based on certification alone.

== Release history ==
Country	Date	Format	Label	Catalogue
Australia	20 March 2015	Digital download, CD	EMI	4718397
United States	7 April 2015	Digital download	Astralwerks	2547183972
