= Claptone =

German DJ and producer duo

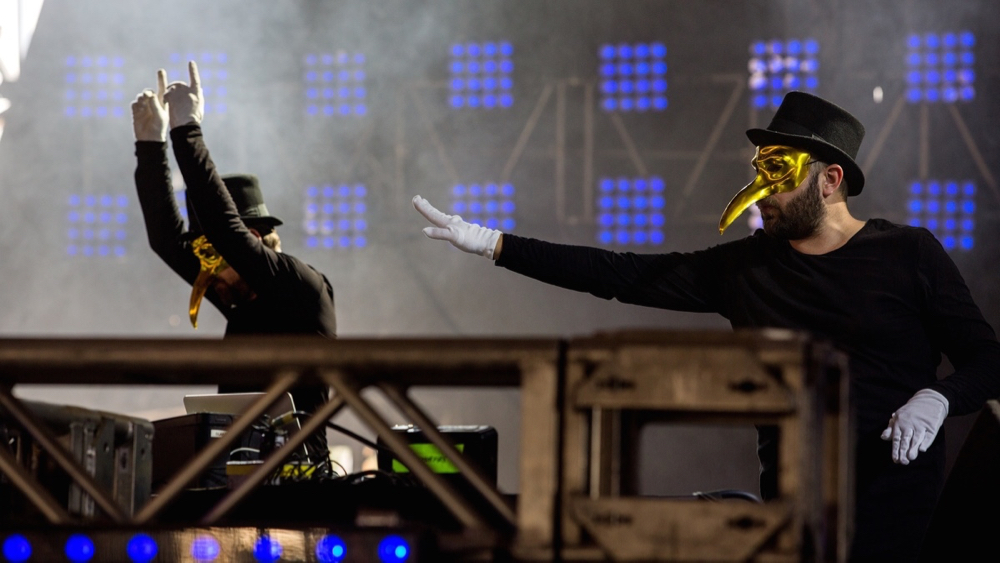
- Claptone at the Coachella Festival in 2016

Background information
- Born: Germany
- Genres: Tech house; house
- Occupations: DJ; music producer
- Website: Official website

Claptone is a German tech house producer and DJ who performs in a golden mask of the plague doctor, which serves to conceal his identity and arouses intrigue among the public.

It was widely believed that Claptone is a single person, but after the public realized that Claptone often performed at three venues at once, the rumour started to spread that Claptone was three individuals. Although more recently, Claptone only appears to have appeared at two venues on any one day. Claptone has performed at iconic venues including Hï Ibiza (formally Space), Pacha and Tomorrowland.

Claptone has been an Ibiza favourite for many years with his current residency at Chinois, Ibiza in its second year in 2026 with previous residencies on the island at Pacha for 3 years and Amnesia for one year.

== Life and career ==
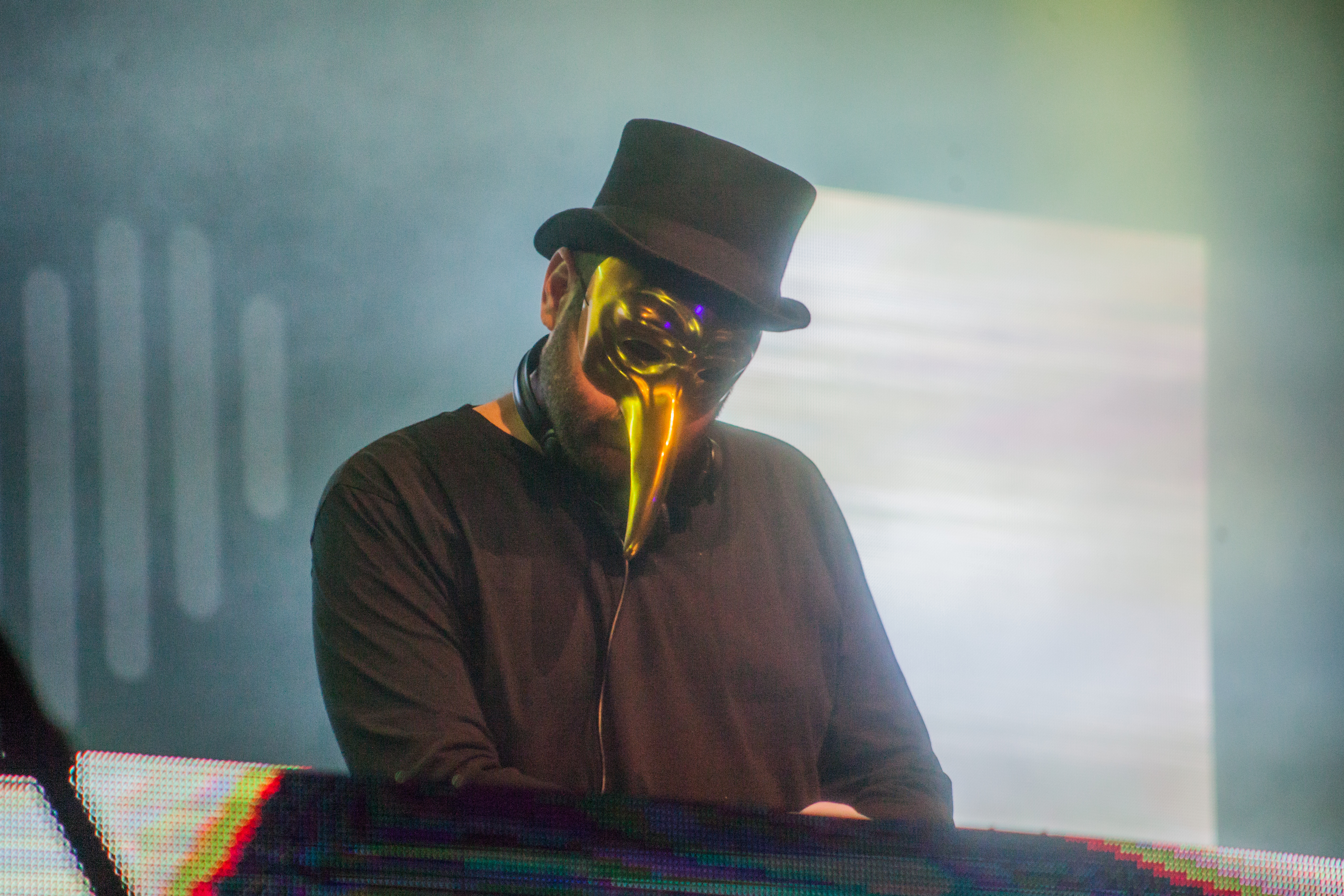
Claptone at Beats for Love festival in 2019

Claptone gained recognition in 2013 with the song "No Eyes" featuring JAW, from the electronic act dOP. He has released albums Charmer in 2015 on Different Recordings and The Masquerade Mixes in 2017.

In 2015, Mixmag described Claptone as “one of the most visible characters in the global deep house scene” and his music as “crisply produced and effortlessly infectious”. He has collaborated with a number of indie bands and singer-songwriters. Charmer included vocals from Peter Bjorn and John, JAW, Jay-Jay Johanson, and Boxer Rebellion's Nathan Nicholson, among others. Mixmag notes that Claptone's remix of Gregory Porter's Liquid Spirit from the eponymous album “has become a Beatport bestseller and one of the biggest tunes of the year” (2015).

In April 2016 Claptone performed as Claptone IMMORTAL, the 2 DJ performance. Claptone has since played a Europe version and American version of the performance; the tomorrow land persona being drastically different than the exchange LA Version.

According to the online jazz magazine The Jazz Line, the Claptone remix was in part responsible for the Porter's album success. The album achieved Gold status in the UK after the Claptone remix debuted on the Essential Mix of BBC Radio 1 and then topped the Beatport chart, prompting dance music lovers to seek out Porter's original recording.

Claptone's usual attire includes a golden beaked mask, similar to the Plague Doctor, and white gloves, so his identity remains a mystery. Little is known about Claptone's background apart from the fact that the act is based in Berlin. According to the web site Warp.la, the act is in fact two people, who sometimes perform together.

== Discography ==
=== Albums ===
- Charmer (2015)
- The Masquerade (2016)
- Fantast (2018)
- Closer (2021)
- Wanderer (2026)
