= Loner (Alison Wonderland album) =

Studio album by Alison Wonderland
- Released: 6 May 2022
- Length: 35:18
- Label: EMI Australia
- Producer: Alison Wonderland; Blush; Mark Jackson; Valentino Khan; Memba; Chet Porter; Jacob Ray; Said the Sky; Ian Brendon Scott

Alison Wonderland chronology
Awake (2018)	Loner (2022)	Ghost World (2025)

Singles from Loner
- 1. "Bad Things" Released: 24 September 2020; 2. "Fuck U Love U" Released: 2 December 2021; 3. "Fear of Dying" Released: 2 January 2022; 4. "New Day" Released: 10 March 2022; 5. "Forever" Released: 8 April 2022; 6. "Something Real" Released: 3 May 2022

Loner is the third studio album by Australian DJ and producer Alison Wonderland, released on 6 May 2022 through EMI Music Australia. It follows four years after her previous album Awake, and was preceded by the singles "Bad Things", "Fuck U Love U", "Fear of Dying", "New Day" and "Forever". She toured North America in support of the record.

== Background ==
After years of touring, Wonderland said that the COVID-19 pandemic halting events around the world in 2020 left her feeling "entirely alone" and as if she "had hit [her] rock bottom". She eventually returned to recording music as a "way to move forward", taking inspiration from her previous albums to "work out where she's going" and to no longer "be the victim" in the stories she tells. Wonderland called Loner a "rebirth" as well as her "most positive album" and hoped that the album would "empower" listeners to "feel less alone".

Wonderland initially announced a new album at the end of 2021.

== Themes ==
EDM.com called the use of blindfolds on the cover and in the singles' music videos "a motif for vulnerability and detachment".

== Critical reception ==
Professional ratings
Review scores
Source	Rating
Gigwise	8/10 stars

Nicole Otero of Gigwise complimented Loner's "intricate sounds and disarming and raw feelings supporting wickedly clever lyrics" as well as its blend of "emotional content" and "anthemic drops", calling it Wonderland's "best album to date" and writing that it will "inspire her fans to look ahead to a better tomorrow".

== Track listing ==
Loner track listing
No.	Title	Writer(s)	Producer(s)	Length
1.	"Forever"	Alexandra Sholler; James Egbert; Trevor Christensen	Alison Wonderland; Said the Sky^{[p]}; Egbert^{[a]}	3:14
2.	"Safe Life"	Sholler; Christensen	Wonderland; Said the Sky^{[p]}	3:19
3.	"Fuck U Love U"	Sholler; Christensen; Ishaan Chaudhary; William Curry	Wonderland; Memba; Said the Sky^{[a]}^{[v]}	3:10
4.	"New Day"	Sholler; Jacob Ray; Christensen; Trent Kneiss	Wonderland; Blush; Said the Sky^{[a]}^{[v]}	2:38
5.	"I'm Doing Great Now Thanks (Interlude)"	Sholler; Ray	Wonderland; Ray	1:28
6.	"Down the Line"	Sholler; Ray; Christensen; Ian Brendon Scott; Mark Jackson; Grace Pitts	Wonderland; Said the Sky^{[p]}; Ray^{[a]}	3:28
7.	"Something Real"	Sholler; Ray; Christensen	Wonderland; Said the Sky^{[p]}; Ray^{[a]}	3:49
8.	"Eyes Closed"	Sholler; Chaudhary; Curry	Wonderland; Memba; Quix^{[a]}	2:44
9.	"Bad Things"	Sholler; Chaudhary; Curry; Valentino Khan; Kneiss; Chet Porter	Wonderland; Memba^{[a]}; Blush^{[a]}; Porter^{[a]}	3:29
10.	"Thirst"	Sholler; Chaudhary; Curry	Wonderland; Memba	2:44
11.	"Cocaine"	Sholler; Khan	Wonderland; Khan	2:29
12.	"Fear of Dying"	Sholler; Scott; Jackson	Wonderland; Scott; Jackson; Said the Sky^{[a]}^{[v]}	3:07
13.	"Loner"	Sholler; Ray; Christensen; Salomon Valensuela	Wonderland; Ray; Said the Sky^{[p]}; Saloh; Kniess^{[a]}	3:07
Total length:				38:46

=== Notes ===
- "Down the Line" is not included on CD releases.
- ^{^[p]} indicates a primary and vocal producer
- ^{^[a]} indicates an additional producer
- ^{^[v]} indicates a vocal producer

== Personnel ==
Credits adapted from Tidal.

- Alison Wonderland – vocals, programming (all tracks); mixing (track 5)
- Tom Norris – mixing (1, 2, 4, 6, 7)
- Memba – mixing (3, 8–10, 13), mastering (5, 10)
- Valentino Khan – mixing (11)
- Michael Freeman – mixing (12)
- Dale Becker – mastering (1–4, 6, 7, 11, 12)
- Quix – mastering (8)
- Chris Gehringer – mastering (9, 13)
- Hector Vega – engineering (1–4, 6, 7, 11, 12)
- Katie Harvey – engineering (1–4, 6, 7, 11, 12)
- Jacob Ray – guitar (4)

== Charts ==
Chart performance for Loner
Chart (2022)	Peak position
Australian Albums (ARIA)	9
New Zealand Albums (RMNZ)	15
US Top Album Sales (Billboard)	38
US Top Dance Albums (Billboard)	3
