= Edge of Desire =

Single by Jonas Blue and Malive
- Released: 18 July 2025
- Genre: House
- Length: 2:14
- Label: Defected
- Songwriters: Guy James Robin; Leo Stannard; Mali-Koa Hood; Vinicius Pereira Lima
- Producers: Jonas Blue; Malive

Jonas Blue singles chronology
"Lifeline" (2025)	"Edge of Desire" (2025)	"Madan" (2026)

Malive singles chronology
"Onda" (2025)	"Edge of Desire" (2025)	"Lotus 72D" (2025)

"Edge of Desire" is a song by English DJ and record producer Jonas Blue and Brazilian producer Malive, released by Defected Records on 18 July 2025. The house song was written by Blue, Malive, Leo Stannard and Australian singer AR/CO, the latter also providing the vocals. Following the song's commercial success, 12-inch vinyl copies were released by Defected Records on 15 May 2026.

== Background ==
In the summer of 2024, Blue felt he no longer wanted to continue with the musical style that had brought him commercial success, and decided to return to his house music roots. This decision led him to join forces with Defected Records, the label he had signed with at the age of 18, and then came the release of "Edge of Desire" in 2025.

Blue explained that the song was one of the first tracks he had composed after moving to Miami, United States, which he described as "a complete reset" for him. Blue discovered Malive through his track "Quintal", which he heard in a DJ mix by Polish producer Adam Port, and then contacted him on Instagram to invite him to collaborate.

Blue explained to Billboard that the intention of the song was "to really touch on [his] early influences within dance music". He later told EDM Identity that although it sounds different from what audiences are used to hearing from him, the song was written in the same spirit as his previous tracks, explaining that only the production is different in style.

== Composition and lyrics ==
"Edge of Desire" is a house song incorporating vocal parts, guitar riffs and synths. The track was seen as a summery record, opening with the line "I'm going all in / Sun in the morning". The production features elements characteristic of both artists, blending Blue's "polished pop-house style" with Malive's "textured, club-ready vibe". The artistic direction of Blue was seen as a shift towards a more club-oriented sound, with an Afro house approach.

== Commercial performance and nominations ==
Commercially, "Edge of Desire" reached number one on the Beatport chart in August 2025. By the end of November 2025, the song had accumulated over 50 million streams worldwide, and had also been broadcast on major radio stations. In February 2026, the song has been nominated in the "House Track of the Year" category at the Electronic Dance Music Awards. As of May 2026, it had surpassed 200 million streams internationally. Following the song's commercial success, 12-inch vinyl copies were released by Defected Records on 15 May 2026, featuring reinterpretations from Franky Rizardo, Jazz-n-Groove and Grigoré and Serve Cold, alongside the original version.

== Track listing ==
- Digital download and streaming
1. "Edge of Desire" – 2:14
2. "Edge of Desire" (extended mix) – 4:12
- Digital download and streaming – Jazz-n-Groove club mix
1. "Edge of Desire" (Jazz-n-Groove club mix) – 3:12
2. "Edge of Desire" – 2:14
3. "Edge of Desire" (Jazz-n-Groove extended club mix) – 6:19
- Digital download and streaming – Grigoré and Serve Cold remix
1. "Edge of Desire" (Grigoré and Serve Cold remix) – 3:24
2. "Edge of Desire" (Grigoré and Serve Cold extended remix) – 5:45
- Digital download and streaming – sunrise mix
1. "Edge of Desire" (sunrise mix) – 2:42

- Digital download and streaming – remixes
1. "Edge of Desire" – 2:14
2. "Edge of Desire" (Franky Rizardo remix) – 2:59
3. "Edge of Desire" (Grigoré and Serve Cold remix) – 3:24
4. "Edge of Desire" (Jazz-n-Groove club mix) – 3:12
5. "Edge of Desire" (sunrise mix) – 2:42
6. "Edge of Desire" (extended mix) – 4:12
7. "Edge of Desire" (accapella) – 2:30
- 12-inch vinyl

Side A

1. "Edge of Desire"
2. "Edge of Desire" (Jazz-n-Groove club mix)
3. "Edge of Desire" (accapella)

Side B

1. "Edge of Desire" (Franky Rizardo remix)
2. "Edge of Desire" (Grigoré and Serve Cold remix)

== Credits and personnel ==
- Jonas Blue – composition, lyrics, production, programming; mixing engineering (sunrise mix)
- Malive – composition, lyrics, production, programming
- AR/CO – composition, lyrics, vocals
- Leo Stannard – composition, lyrics
- Julien Jabre – mixing engineering; mastering engineering (extended mix)
- Dean Mark – bass

== Charts ==
=== Weekly charts ===
Weekly chart performance for "Edge of Desire"
Chart (2025–2026)	Peak position
Australia Club Tracks (ARIA)	3
Belarus Airplay (TopHit)	54
Belgium (Ultratop 50 Flanders)	5
CIS Airplay (TopHit)	17
Croatia International Airplay (Top lista)	43
Global Dance Radio (Billboard/WARM)	14
Greece International (IFPI)	18
Hungary (Dance Top 40)	11
Ireland (IRMA)	66
Italy (FIMI)	78
Kazakhstan Airplay (TopHit)	24
Lithuania Airplay (TopHit)	58
Moldova Airplay (TopHit)	24
Netherlands (Dutch Top 40)	7
Netherlands (Single Top 100)	11
North Macedonia Airplay (Radiomonitor)	1
Portugal (AFP)	174
Romania Airplay (Media Forest)	3
Russia Airplay (TopHit)	19
Serbia Airplay (Radiomonitor)	15
Slovakia Airplay (ČNS IFPI)	47
Switzerland (Schweizer Hitparade)	97
Turkey International Airplay (Radiomonitor Türkiye)	2
UK Singles (Official Charts)	71
UK Dance (Official Charts)	18
UK Indie (Official Charts)	16
Ukraine Airplay (TopHit)	51
US Dance Airplay (Billboard)	2

=== Monthly charts ===
Monthly chart performance for "Edge of Desire"
Chart (2025–2026)	Peak position
Belarus Airplay (TopHit)	78
CIS Airplay (TopHit)	22
Kazakhstan Airplay (TopHit)	32
Lithuania Airplay (TopHit)	77
Moldova Airplay (TopHit)	34
Romania Airplay (TopHit)	14
Russia Airplay (TopHit)	25
Ukraine Airplay (TopHit)	66

=== Year-end charts ===
Year-end chart performance for "Edge of Desire"
Chart (2025)	Position
CIS Airplay (TopHit)	165
Romania Airplay (TopHit)	79

== Certifications ==
Certifications for "Edge of Desire"
Region	Certification	Certified units/sales
Portugal (AFP)	Gold	12,000^{‡}
United Kingdom (BPI)	Silver	200,000^{‡}
Streaming
Greece (IFPI Greece)	Gold	1,000,000^{†}
^{‡} Sales+streaming figures based on certification alone.^{†} Streaming-only figures based on certification alone.

== Release history ==
Release dates and formats for "Edge of Desire"
Region	Date	Format	Label	Ref.
Various	18 July 2025	Digital download; streaming	Defected	
Italy	29 August 2025	Radio airplay	Defected	
Various	15 May 2026	12-inch vinyl	Defected	
