= High (Alison Wonderland song) =

Single by Alison Wonderland featuring Trippie Redd

from the album Awake
- Released: 20 March 2018
- Genre: Bass; trap
- Length: 2:54
- Label: EMI
- Songwriters: Alexandra Sholler; Michael White II
- Producer: Alison Wonderland

Alison Wonderland singles chronology
"No" (2018)	"High" (2018)	"Easy" (2018)

Trippie Redd singles chronology
"Fuck Love" (2018)	"High" (2018)	"Bool" (2018)

Music video
- "High" on YouTube

"High" is a song by Australian DJ and producer Alison Wonderland featuring American rapper Trippie Redd. It was released on 20 March 2018 as the fourth single from her second studio album Awake.

== Content ==
Alison Wonderland said during an ABC interview: "When Redd heard this song it was very organic and he jumped in the booth and we walked out feeling that we had something special. I felt like this song had a certain spirit and wanted people to feel like they were going on a journey with us... just like when watching the music video."

== Music video ==
The music video was released on 21 March 2018, directed by Alison Wonderland herself with cinematography by Jeffrey Zoss, and animation produced by Jayme Lemperle and Evan Red Borja. The video showed the two artists sat against a backdrop of a flower bed with a glitchy trippy fold as they each smoke and roll a cigar respectively as they get "High."

== Charts ==
=== Weekly charts ===
Chart (2018)	Peak position
US Hot Dance/Electronic Songs (Billboard)	18

=== Year-end charts ===
Chart (2018)	Position
US Hot Dance/Electronic Songs (Billboard)	100
