= Church (Alison Wonderland song) =

Single by Alison Wonderland

from the album Awake
- Released: 16 February 2018
- Length: 3:04
- Label: EMI
- Songwriters: Sholler; Joel Little

Alison Wonderland singles chronology
"Happy Place" (2017)	"Church" (2018)	"No" (2018)

Music video
- "Church" on YouTube

"Church" is a song by Australian electronic DJ and producer Alison Wonderland. It was released on 16 February 2018 as the second single from Wonderland's second studio album, Awake. The song peaked at number 54 in Australia. Remixes were released on 30 March 2018.

"Church" is about breaking out of a toxic relationship and realising your own self-worth. Wonderland told Triple J "But it was the first thing that came to my mind. I felt like shouting at that person "I wish you would treat me like church! Praise me, make me feel like I'm worth something"."

The accompanying video for "Church" was shot in Los Angeles and directed by Bo Mirosseni. It depicts an ethereal Wonderland and a young gospel choir against a church backdrop.

== Reception ==
Kat Bein from Billboard said "Next time you need a pick me up, listen to Alison Wonderland's 'Church.'" saying "It's triumphant with a big, booming chorus and a beat that bounces happily in the face of anyone who wants to tear you down."

== Track listing ==
- One-track single
1. "Church" – 3:04
- Remixes
1. "Church" (Naderi remix) – 3:30
2. "Church" (The Presets remix) – 4:24
3. "Church" (Ghost Choir remix) – 2:54
4. "Church" (Party Pupils remix) – 2:55
5. "Church" (Hex Cougar remix) – 3:29

== Charts ==
Chart (2018)	Peak position
Australia (ARIA)	54
Australian Artists (ARIA)	5
Australia Dance (ARIA)	7
Australia Streaming (ARIA)	3
New Zealand Heatseekers (RMNZ)	5
US Hot Dance/Electronic Songs (Billboard)	35

== Certifications ==
Region	Certification	Certified units/sales
Australia (ARIA)	Platinum	70,000^{‡}
New Zealand (RMNZ)	Gold	15,000^{‡}
^{‡} Sales+streaming figures based on certification alone.

== Release history ==
Country	Date	Format	Label
Australia	16 February 2018	Digital download, streaming	EMI
