= Armada Music =

Dutch record label specialized in electronic dance music

- Armada Music logo since 2022
- Founded: 2003
- Founder: Armin van Buuren, Maykel Piron, David Lewis
- Genre: EDM; trance; progressive trance; electro house; house; progressive house; deep house; tech house; techno
- Country of origin: Netherlands
- Location: Amsterdam
- Official website: www.armadamusic.com

Armada Music is a Dutch independent record label that specialises in electronic dance music. The company is headquartered in Amsterdam and has offices in New York, London and Laren, Netherlands.

As of 2026, artists represented by Armada Music include Armin van Buuren, Arty, D.O.D, Eelke Kleijn, Jan Blomqvist, Joris Voorn, KI/KI, Lilly Palmer, Loud Luxury, Sunnery James & Ryan Marciano, THEMBA and Yulia Niko.

== History ==
Armada Music was founded in 2003 by Dutch producer Armin van Buuren, Dutch business executive Maykel Piron and music manager David Lewis. The name is derived from the first two letters of the founders' names: Armin, Maykel and David.

On 20 April 2023, Armada launched BEAT Music Fund, described by the company as the first dance music investment company. Its first acquisitions included the master recordings catalog of Kevin Saunderson's KMS Records and the master and publishing catalog of Arty, also known as Alpha 9.

In June 2023, BEAT Music Fund acquired New York house label King Street Sounds and the master and publishing catalog of Dutch dance duo Chocolate Puma.

In April 2024, Armada formed a new parent company, Armada Music Group, to encompass its label, publishing and investment arms. The same announcement included the acquisition of Amsterdam-based publisher Cloud 9 Music, whose publishing division was merged into Armada Music Publishing.

In September 2025, BEAT Music Fund acquired the entire master rights catalog of Mixmash Records, the label founded by Laidback Luke and Olga Heijns. The following month, Armada Music partnered with former Defected Records founder Simon Dunmore to launch NBT Records, a new label based at Armada's London creative hub. In November 2025, Armada Music acquired the worldwide rights to the entire catalog of British singer-songwriter and DJ Sonique, including "It Feels So Good".

== Sub-labels ==
Labels within Armada Music include:

- All I Need
- Armada Music
- Armada Captivating
- Armada Chill
- Armada Electronic Elements
- Armada Subjekt
- Armind
- A State of Trance
- DAYS like NIGHTS
- Delecta Records
- Flashover Recordings
- SONO Music
- Who's Afraid of 138?!
- slash
- King Street Sounds

== Awards and nominations ==
As of December 2015, the label had won the "Best Global Record Label" award for five years in a row at the International Dance Music Awards (IDMA's). Armada received two nominations at the 2014 IDMAs, and seven in 2019. The Academy of Electronic Music, a joint venture between Armada, Google, Point Blank, and DJ Mag, was the recipient of the 'People's Voice Award' at the 2014 Webby Awards. In 2016, Armada Music was one of the 21 labels nominated for the IMPALA FIVEUNDERFIFTEEN campaign shining a light on Europe's most inspiring young labels. The label received the IMPALA Young Label Spotlight Award.
