= Beats for Love =

Czech annual electronic dance music festival

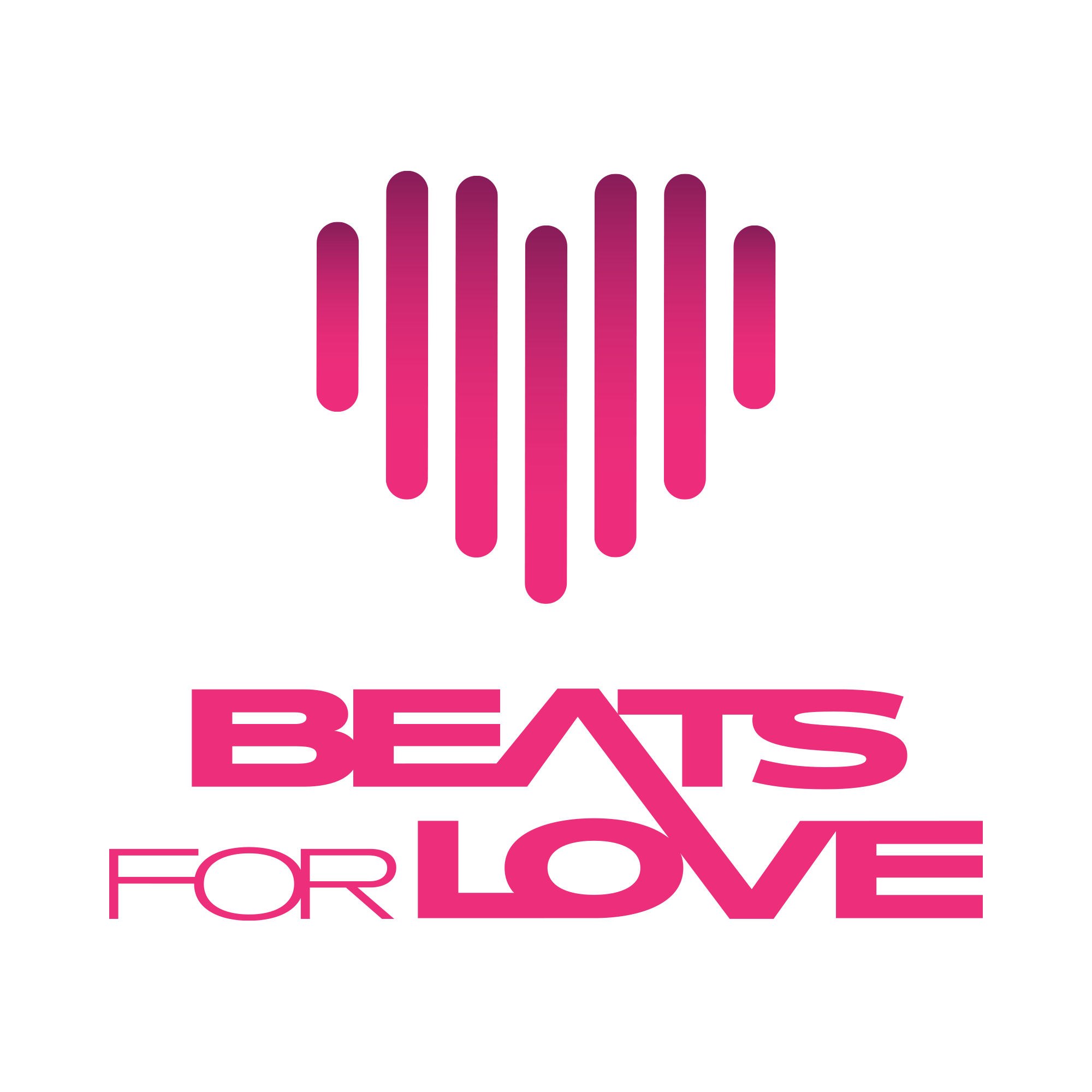
- Genre: Electronic dance music
- Dates: First weekend in July (4 days)
- Locations: Ostrava, Czechia
- Years active: 2013–present
- Founders: Kamil Rudolf
- Website: b4l.cz

Beats for Love (abbreviated as B4L) is an annual electronic dance music festival held every first weekend of July since 2013 in Lower Vítkovice, Ostrava, Czech Republic. The festival features multiple stages focused on different subgenres of electronic dance music, such as drum and bass, house, and techno.

The festival is the largest festival of electronic music in Central Europe. In 2024, the festival was ranked among the top 100 festivals by DJ Mag readers.

== History ==
The festival was founded by Kamil Rudolf as a three-day festival and first took place in 2013. In its first year, it featured 5 stages, hosted about 200 artists and attracted 25,000 people. The following year, in 2014, 35,000 people attended the festival. In 2015, the festival was extended to four days, featuring 11 stages and more than 350 artists.

In 2016, the festival announced a complete sell-out, attracting about 42,000 people, and featured English drum and bass duo Sigma and Swiss DJ Mike Candys.

In 2017, the festival introduced a new Love Stage measuring 50 × 26 meters (164 × 85.3 feet), which hosted the main headliners, English DJ Fatboy Slim, English music duo Chase & Status, and English DJ Sigala. About 40,000 people attended the festival.

In 2018, the festival sold out once again, as in 2016, and attracted about 50,000 attendees. The lineup of over 400 artists included Norwegian DJ Alan Walker, Swedish electronic music duo Galantis, and American house DJ Roger Sanchez.

In 2019, 150,000 people attended the festival, which was three times more than the previous year. The festival featured Dutch DJ Don Diablo and German DJ Robin Schulz.

In 2020, the festival was organized in a reduced format due to the COVID-19 restrictions, featuring two separate stages, each for 1,000 people. In 2021, a similar format was presented; however, the two stages were not separated and the attendance limit was increased to 5,000 people, in accordance with Czech government regulations, which permitted up to 2,000 people indoors and 5,000 outdoors.

In 2022, the festival returned as a full-scale festival without any restrictions. As the pandemic restrictions in the Czech Republic were lifted, the festival attracted 160,000 people and featured Dutch DJ Armin van Buuren, Belgian DJ Lost Frequencies, Australian DJ Timmy Trumpet, Israeli DJ duo Vini Vici, and Alan Walker, who returned after his previous performance in 2018. During the first day of the festival, a rainstorm damaged the drum and bass stage, leading to its closure for the remainder of the festival.

In 2023, 150,000 people attended the festival. The main headliners were Canadian DJ Deadmau5, Dutch DJ Hardwell, and Dutch DJ Tiësto, who attracted 40,000 people on the last day.

In 2024, the festival introduced a fully cashless payment system across the entire venue, debuted a new Captain Morgan stage, and featured 512 artists, including French DJ David Guetta, Swedish DJ Eric Prydz, Italian music group Meduza, and returning artists Lost Frequencies and Chase & Status. A total of 162,000 people attended.

In 2025, the festival area was divided into three zones – Love, Industrial and Space, each containing distinct stages. More than 500 artists performed on total of 18 stages, including Swedish DJ Axwell, English DJ Jax Jones, English DJ John Newman, and Armin van Buuren and Timmy Trumpet, both returning after previously performing there in 2022. The budget for this year was CZK 320 million. 164,000 people attended the festival.

In 2026, the festival retained the three-zone layout introduced in 2025 and featured more than 550 artists across 18 stages. The festival also introduced LoveID, a ticketing system requiring mandatory online registration, alongside facial recognition technology to prevent ticket fraud and the unauthorized reuse of tickets. Performers included Belgian DJ Dimitry Vegas, Scottish DJ Calvin Harris, Dutch-Moroccan DJ R3HAB, American DJ Marshmello, and German DJ Lilly Palmer. Festival founder and director Kamil Rudolf stated that attendance had exceeded the previous year's record, although exact figures were not disclosed. The festival's 2026 budget was reported to be approximately CZK 350 million.

== Gallery ==
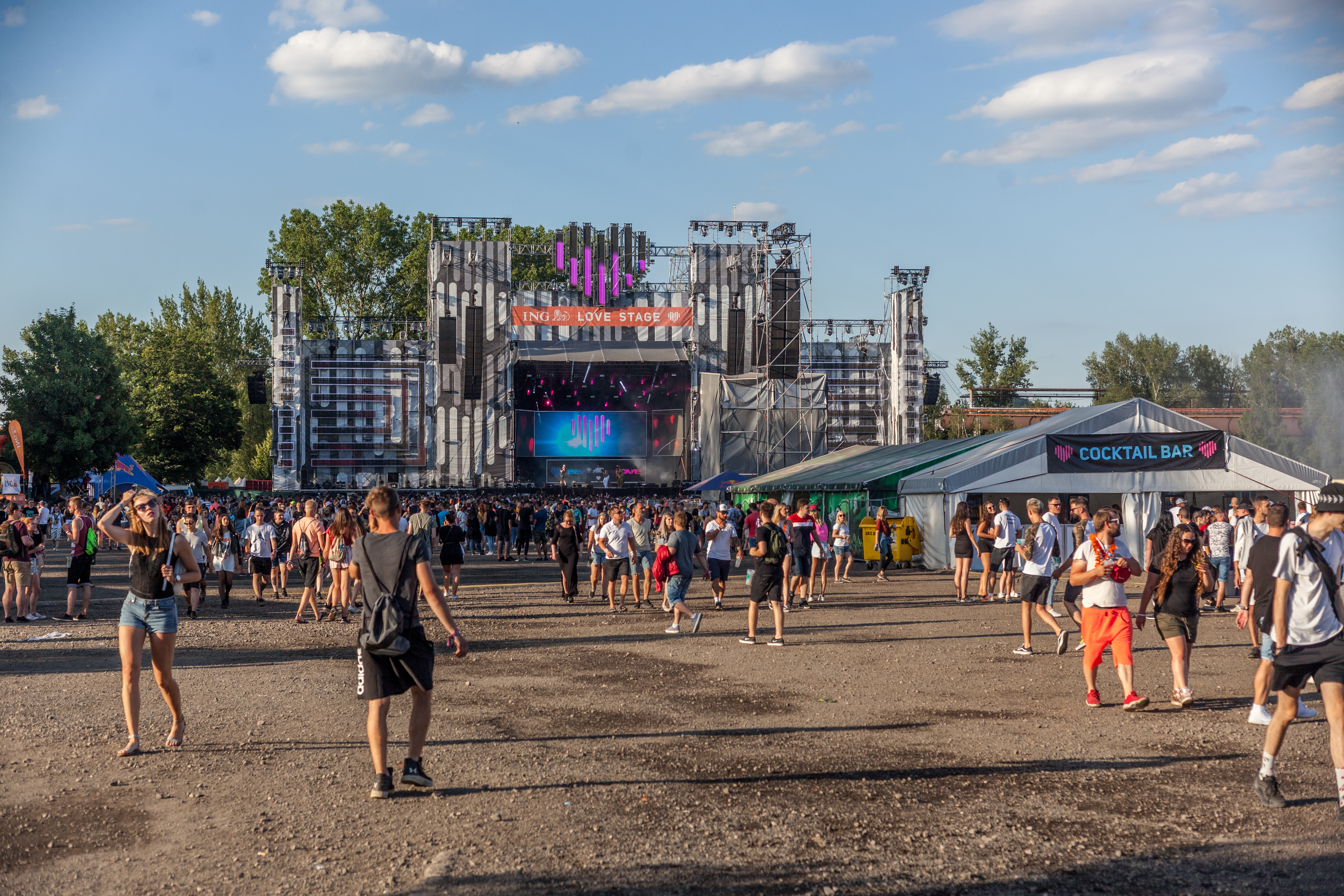
The Love Stage, main stage of the festival (2019)

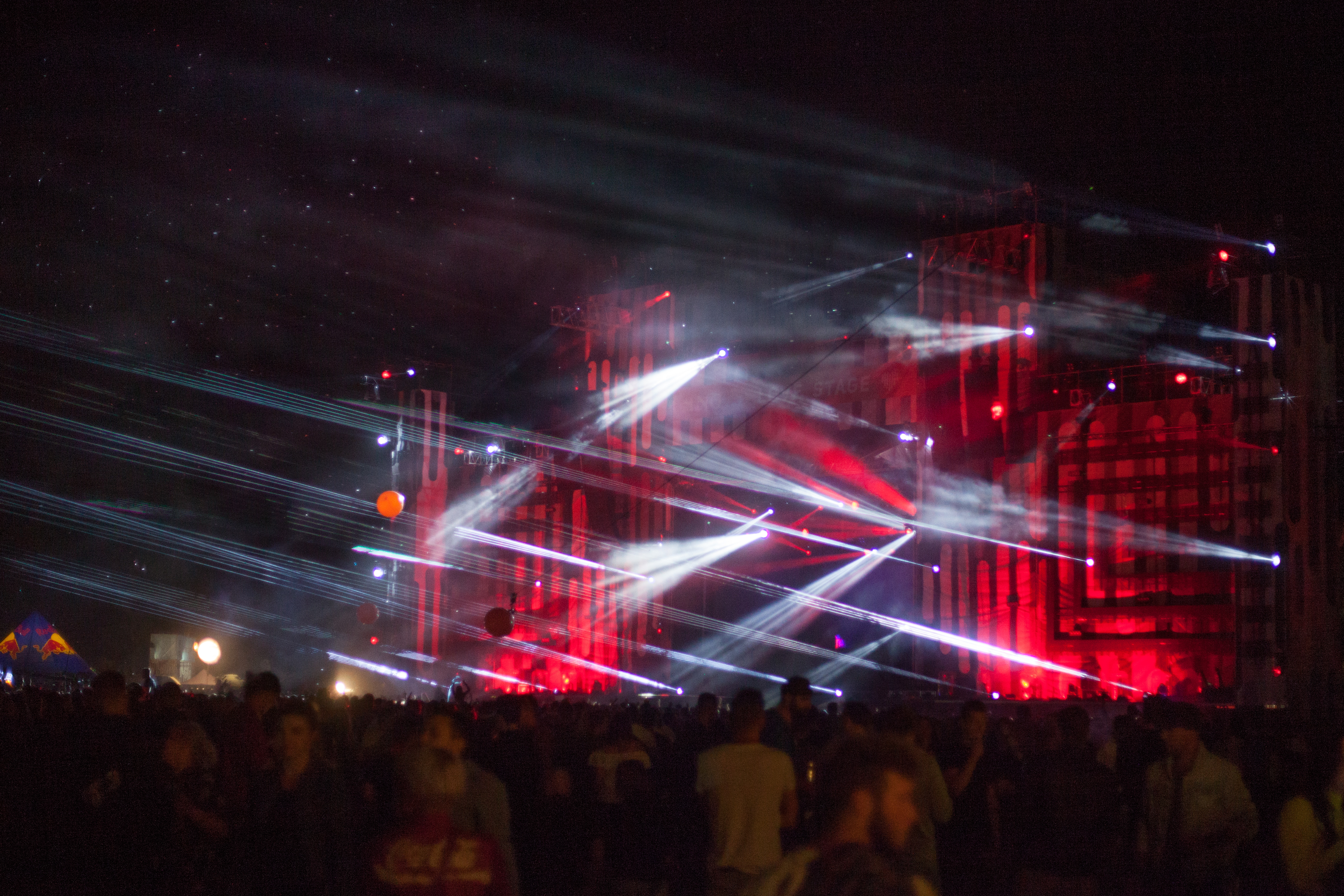
The Love Stage at night (2019)

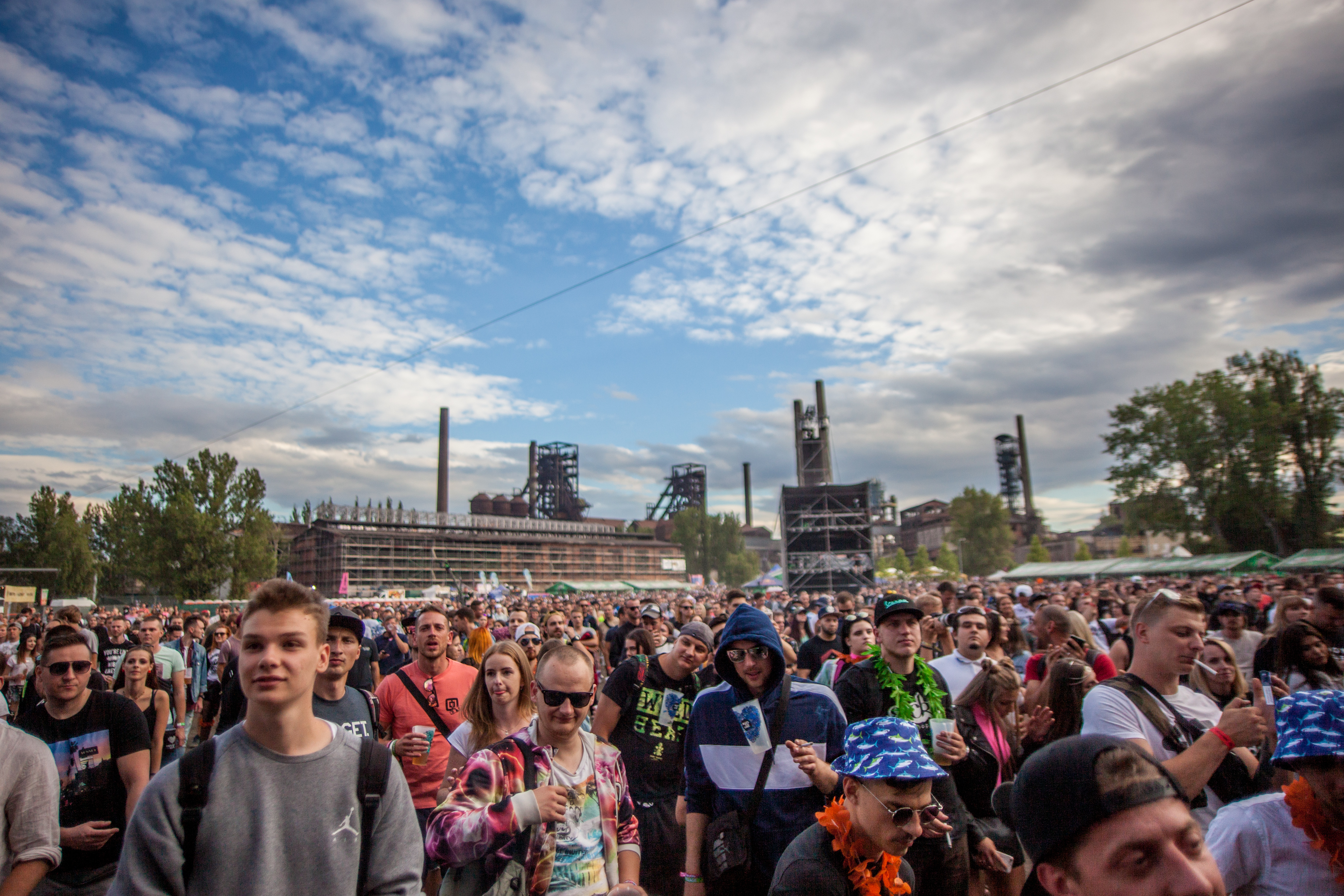
Festival visitors (2019)

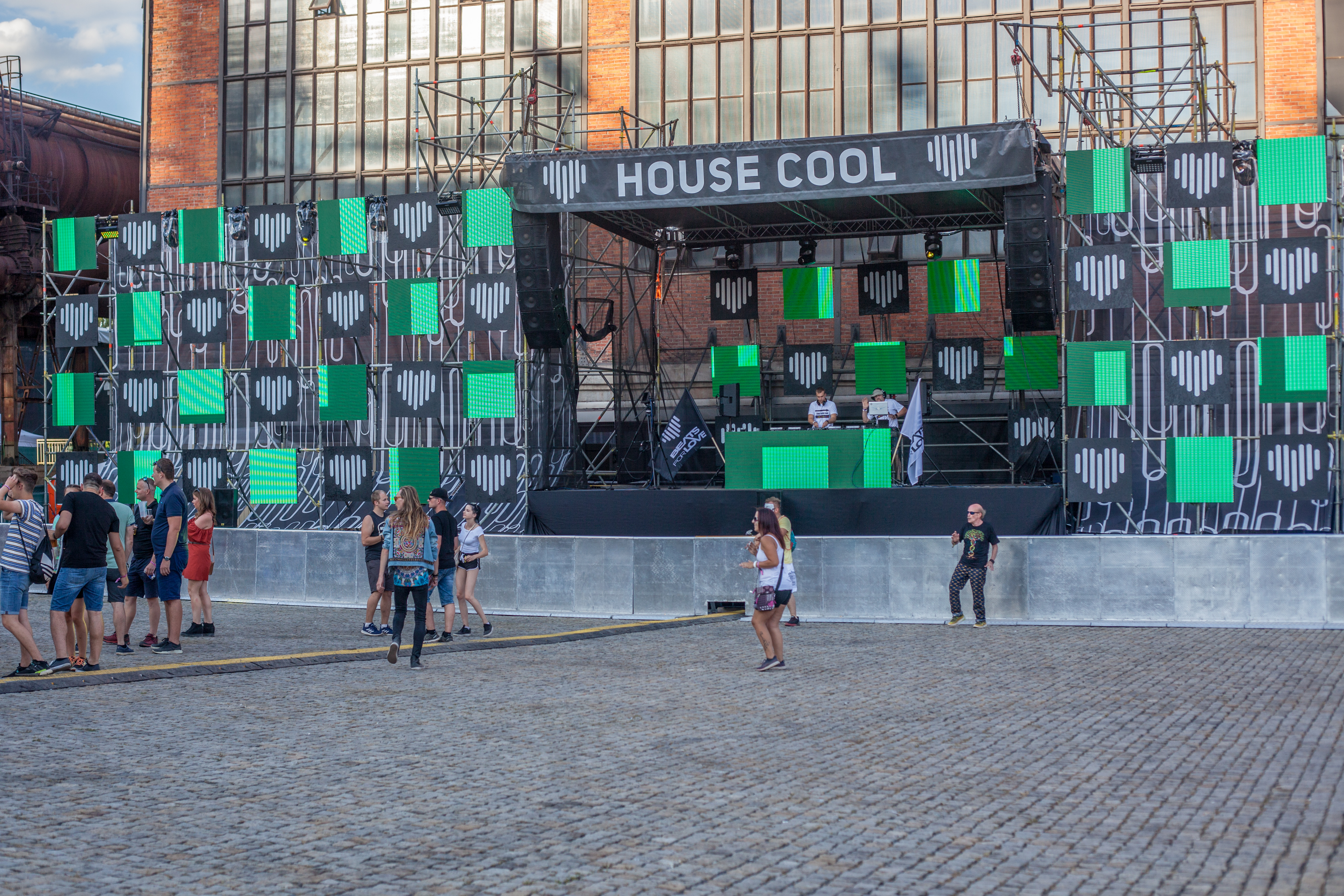
House Cool stage (2019)

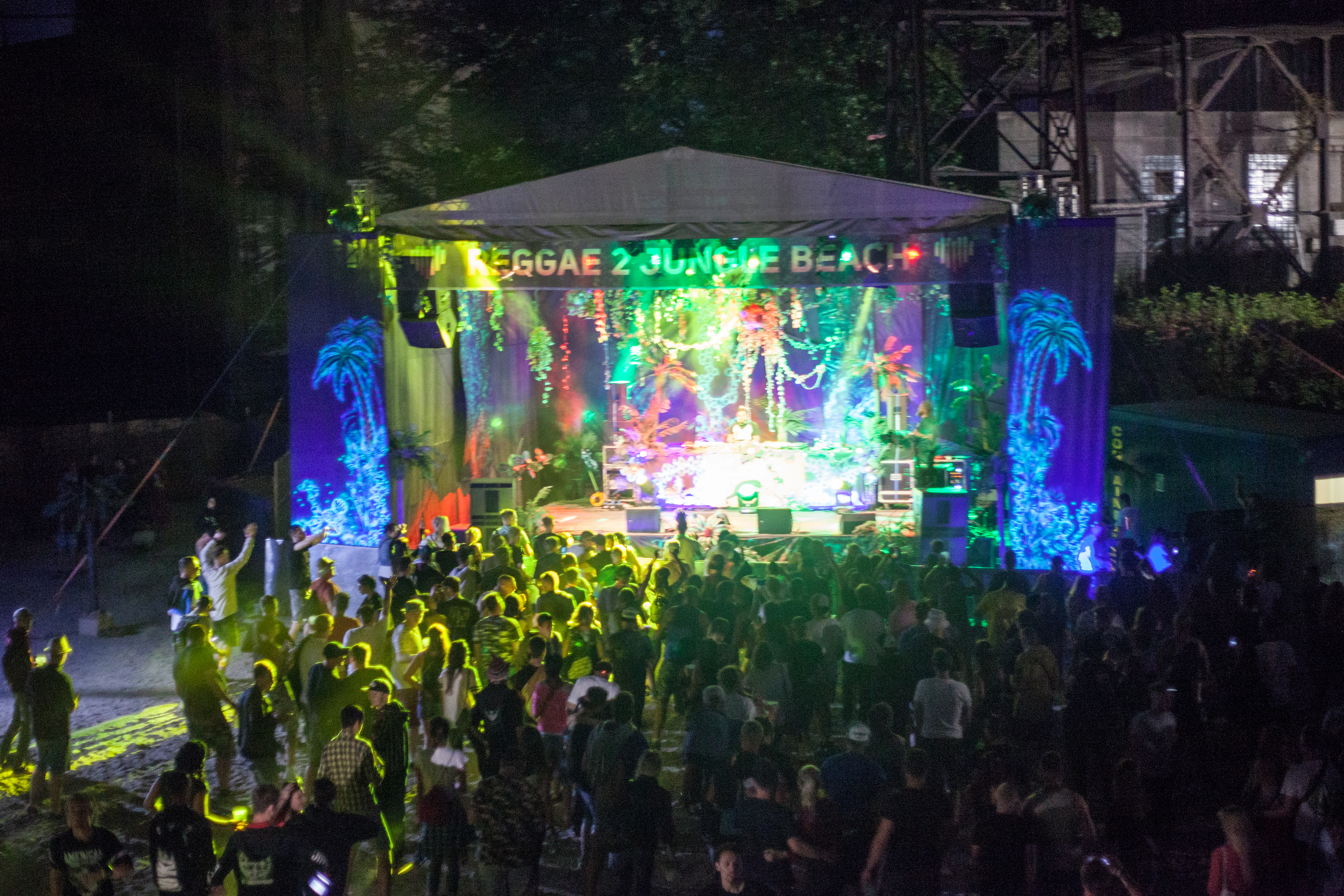
Reggae Jungle Beach stage (2019)

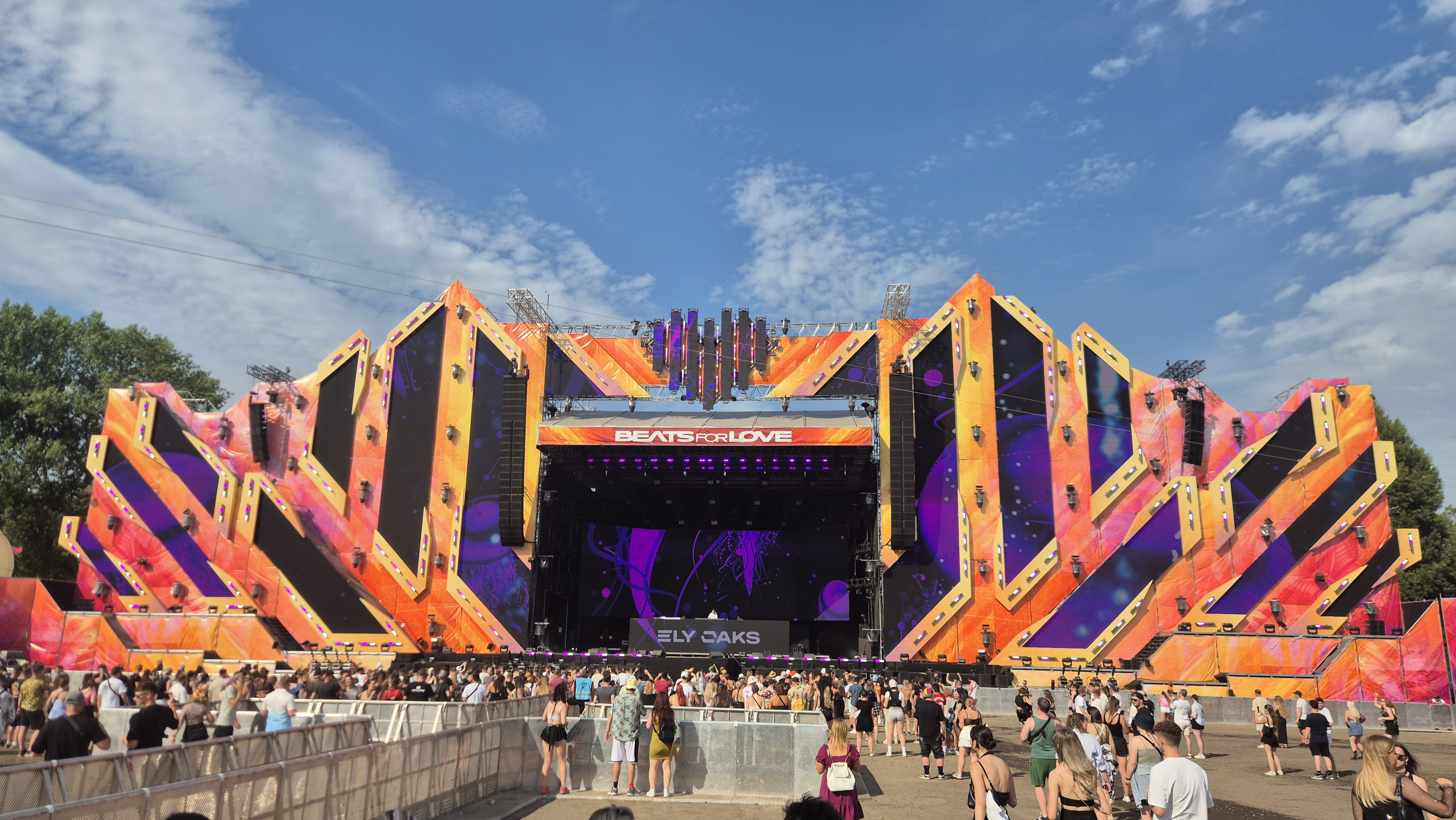
The Love Stage, main stage of the festival (2025)

The Love Stage, main stage of the festival (2026)
