= Kate Linn =

Romanian singer (born 1997)

- Born: Cătălina Ioana Oțeleanu; 27 March 1997 (age 29); Romania
- Genres: Pop
- Occupations: Singer; songwriter
- Instrument: Vocals

Cătălina Ioana Oțeleanu (born 27 March 1997), known professionally as Kate Linn, is a Romanian singer and songwriter. Her musical style combines catchy pop elements with influences from Balkan pop, Latin, and electronic music. She also regularly collaborates with other artists such as Chris Thrace, Anthony Keyrouz, and SICKOTOY.

== Biography ==
Linn was born in Romania and began her musical career as a teenager. In 2015, she made her international debut with the song "Zaynah" (feat. Chris Thrace), which charted in Romania, Bulgaria, and Turkey. In 2017, she won the Golden Palm in Turkey for "Zaynah" and a year later was awarded Best Foreign Artist. Also in 2017, she reached a wider audience in Europe and Asia for the first time with "Your Love". With the singles "Thunderlike " (2018), "Ya La" (2021, with SICKOTOY), and "Chiki Chiki" (2022), Linn established herself in the contemporary Balkan pop scene. In June 2025, her song "Dame Un Grrr" became a viral hit on TikTok; the track was used in millions of videos. The song was written in collaboration with producer Fantomel and released under Universal Music Romania.

== Discography ==
- 2015: Zaynah feat. Chris Thrace
- 2017: Your Love
- 2018: Thunderlike
- 2021: Ya La (with Sickotoy)
- 2022: Chiki Chiki
- 2023: Your Love (Slowed & Reverbed)
- 2023: Thunderlike (Slowed & Reverbed)
- 2025: Dame Un Grrr (with Fantomel)
- 2025: Dame Un Grrr (with Fantomel feat. Jason Derulo)
