= Awake (Alison Wonderland album) =

Studio album by Alison Wonderland
- Released: 6 April 2018
- Length: 44:43
- Label: EMI
- Producer: Alison Wonderland; Joel Little; Lido

Alison Wonderland chronology
| Run (2015) | Awake (2018) | Loner (2022) |

Singles from Awake
- 1. "Happy Place" Released: 9 November 2017; 2. "Church" Released: 16 February 2018; 3. "No" Released: 9 March 2018; 4. "High" Released: 20 March 2018; 5. "Easy" Released: May 2018

Awake is the second studio album from Australian electronic DJ and producer Alison Wonderland. It was released on 6 April 2018 via EMI Music Australia. The album features four singles: "Happy Place", "Church", "No" and "High". In August 2018, Wonderland announced a 4-date national tour commencing in Brisbane in November 2018.

At the ARIA Music Awards of 2018, the album was nominated for two awards; Best Female Artist and Best Dance Release.

== Critical reception ==
Matt Collar from AllMusic said: "Showcasing the Aussie DJ's brightly effusive vocals and shimmering, propulsive electronic productions, Awake is an expansive, deeply felt album."

== Singles ==
"Happy Place" was released on 9 November 2017 as the album's lead single alongside the album's announcement. She told Triple J: "I wrote it about me trying to find my 'Happy Place'." "Church" was released as the album's second single on 16 February 2018. The song has peaked at number 54 on the ARIA Singles Chart. "No" was released on 9 March 2018 and is about "fake people". "High" was released on 20 March 2018 as the album's fourth single.

== Track listing ==
| No. | Title | Writer(s) | Producer(s) | Length |
|---|---|---|---|---|
| 1. | "Good Enough" | Alexandra Sholler; Dylan Ragland | Alison Wonderland; Party Favor | 2:18 |
| 2. | "No" | Sholler; Joel Little | Wonderland; Little; King Henry | 4:01 |
| 3. | "Okay" | Sholler; Little | Wonderland; Lido; Eské^{[a]} | 3:54 |
| 4. | "Easy" | Sholler; Little | Little | 3:37 |
| 5. | "High" (featuring Trippie Redd) | Sholler; Michael White II | Wonderland | 2:55 |
| 6. | "Here 4 U" (with Blessus) | Sholler; Ragland | Blessus | 2:45 |
| 7. | "Church" | Sholler; Little | Wonderland; Illangelo | 3:04 |
| 8. | "Cry" | Sholler; Little; Simmie Sims | Wonderland; Little; Lido | 3:20 |
| 9. | "Happy Place" | Sholler; Little; Jonathan Schnell | Wonderland; Lido; Quix | 3:21 |
| 10. | "Good Girls Bad Boys" | Sholler; Sarkis Khaioian | Wonderland; Eske | 2:21 |
| 11. | "Dreamy Dragon" (featuring Chief Keef) | Sholler; Keith Cozart | Wonderland; Eské | 4:22 |
| 12. | "Hope" (interlude) | Sholler; Jonti Danilewitz | Wonderland; Lido | 1:50 |
| 13. | "Sometimes Love" (featuring Slumberjack) | Sholler; Yee Sheng Then; Fletcher Ethers | Wonderland; Slumberjack | 3:22 |
| 14. | "Awake" | Sholler; Little; Hayden James | Wonderland; Little; Lido | 3:43 |
| Total length: | | | | 44:43 |

== Charts ==
| Chart (2018) | Peak position |
|---|---|
| Australian Albums (ARIA) | 7 |
| Australian Dance Albums (ARIA) | 1 |
| New Zealand Albums (RMNZ) | 15 |
| US Billboard 200 | 88 |
| US Top Dance/Electronic Albums (Billboard) | 1 |

== Release history ==
| Country | Date | Format | Label | Catalogue |
|---|---|---|---|---|
| Australia | 6 April 2018 | Digital download, CD, vinyl | EMI | 5798808 |
