= Vincent (music producer) =

Canadian music producer

Robert Vincent Hughes, best known as Vincent and formerly known as XVII, is a Canadian music producer of trap, electronic, bass music and hip hop. He debuted in 2015 with remixes of Meek Mill & Drake's "R.I.C.O." and Alison Wonderland's "U Don't Know." Since 2020 Robert Hughes is also a part of electronic music duo known as Tiger Drool, alongside a fellow record producer, Quix.

== Early life ==
Robert Hughes grew up in Winnipeg, Manitoba and began playing the piano at the age of 4. Being trained in piano through his childhood and high school years, his musical taste evolved into digital production with the introduction of new technology. He was raised and is fully bilingual - speaking English and French - as his mother is of French Canadian descent.

=== Name change ===
According to a Twitch live stream on the night of Tuesday January 21, 2020, Hughes explained that XVII was an alias he'd produced under but was unsatisfied with. Over time, he searched for a new stage name and opted to use his middle name, Vincent.
