= Dame Un Grrr =

"Dame Un Gur, Un Que?"

Single by Ash Trevino featuring Kate Linn
- Released: 20 June 2025
- Genre: Dance-pop; Latin pop
- Length: 2:13
- Label: Creator Records; T-Series
- Songwriters: Ash Trevino; Kate Linn
- Producers: Ash Trevino; Cristian Prajescu

Music video
- "Dame Un Grrr" on YouTube

"Dame Un Grrr" (lit. 'Give Me a Grr') is a song by Romanian music producer Ash Trevino and singer Kate Linn. The song was released in June 2025 and is published by Creator Records in collaboration with T-Series

== Background and composition ==
Dame Un Grrr was released on 25 June 2025, and is the result of a collaboration between producer and composer Ash Trevino and Kate Linn, who participates as a singer and co-writer. Production, mixing, and mastering were handled by Fantomel and Cristian Prajescu.

Dame Un Grrr combines modern pop elements with Latin American rhythms. The lyrics are a mix of English and Spanish phrases and deal with the game of attraction and flirting. The chorus is marked by the repeated phrase "Dame un grr (Un qué?)", which stuck throughout the song.

== Music video ==
The official music video for Dame Un Grrr was released on 1 July 2025. It was directed by Isabella Szanto, with Nicu Dragan behind the camera.

== Commercial performance ==
Dame Un Grrr quickly became a huge hit on streaming platforms and social media, especially on TikTok, where it was used for numerous dance and lip-sync videos. As of March 2026, the song has accumulated over 19.9 million video creations on TikTok, ranking 32nd among the most-used songs on the platform worldwide.

== Charts ==
Chart performance for "Dame Un Grrr"
Chart (2025)	Peak position
Belgium (Ultratop 50 Wallonia)	47
France (SNEP)	50
Greece Foreign Airplay (IFPI)	16
Poland (Polish Airplay Top 100)	28

== Certifications ==
Region	Certification	Certified units/sales
Brazil (Pro-Música Brasil)	Gold	20,000^{‡}
France (SNEP)	Gold	100,000^{‡}
Poland (ZPAV)	Gold	62,500^{‡}
^{‡} Sales+streaming figures based on certification alone.
