= Lilly Palmer =

German disc jockey and music producer

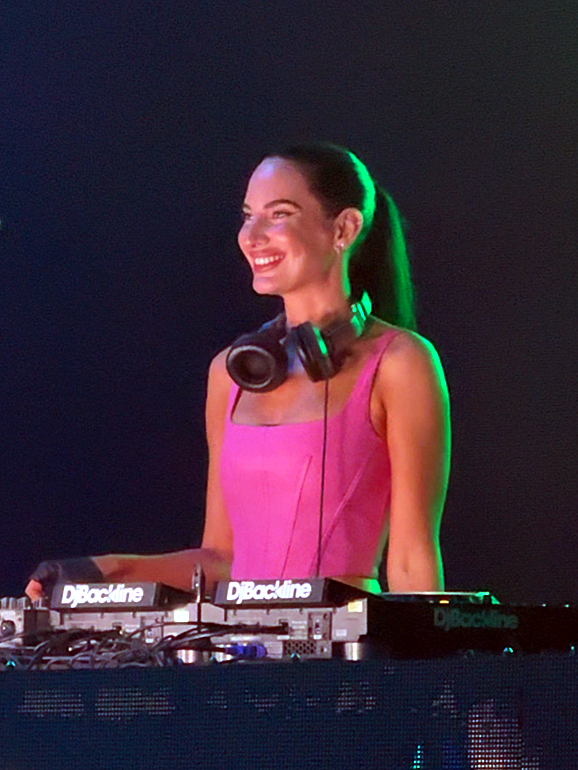
- Palmer at Ultra Miami 2026

Background information
- Born: April 5, 1989 (age 37)
- Origin: Nuremberg, Germany
- Genre: Techno
- Occupations: Record producer, DJ
- Years active: 2020-present
- Labels: Armada, Kontor Universal Music
- Website: lilly-palmer.com

Instagram information
- Page: Lilly Palmer
- Followers: 1.7M (5 April 2026)

Sonja Rauschenbach (born April 5, 1989), better known as Lilly Palmer, is a German techno DJ and record producer.

== Career ==
Palmer grew up in the Nuremberg area, and began her musical career in Zurich, working in small bars and clubs. Initially focused as a DJ playing more melodic techno and deep house, Palmer moved into playing higher tempo 150 BPM in response to the audience reaction.

In June 2022 Palmer performed a 2-hour 28-track Essential Mix on BBC Radio 1. The following year, in 2023, she performed a live set direct from a satellite testing chamber at the European Space Agency, which incorporated samples from the ESA sound archive. In 2024 she signed to Armada Music and Kontor Records, with track "Hare Ram" as the first release under the deal. In 2025, Palmer performed at events including the Sonus Festival and the Ushuaïa Ibiza Beach Hotel, and followed up with a live techno set transmitted from the DJ Mag headquarters.

Palmer has received accolades in the music press, including being called one of the "most exciting names in techno" by Mixmag magazine, and a "star" by DJ Mag. In 2023 music website EDM.com named Palmer as one of the best "producers of the year". In 2025 she ranked at number 57 in the world top 100 DJs poll.

== Discography ==
=== Album ===
- "Bigger Than Techno" (2026)
  No.	Title	Writer(s)	Length
  1.	"Bigger Than Techno"	Lilly Palmer
  2.	"Ayi Giri"	Armin van Buuren, Lilly Palmer
  3.	"Gaana Modam"	Vini Vici, Lilly Palmer feat. Shani People
  4.	"Rotterdam"	Lilly Palmer, Egbert
  5.	"Vicious Chords"	Lilly Palmer, Space 92
  6.	"Left My Morals At The Door"	Lilly Palmer, Danny Avila
  7.	"Hypnosis"	Lilly Palmer
  8.	"Rakete"	Lilly Palmer, Gregor Tresher
  9.	"Hare Ram"	Lilly Palmer
  10.	"Late At Night"	Lilly Palmer, Maddix
  11.	"Cold Blood"	Lilly Palmer
  12.	"Alternate Your Rhythm"	Lilly Palmer, Jose Bonetto
  13.	"Hype Boy"	Lilly Palmer
  14.	"Adrenaline"	Lilly Palmer
  15.	"All Eyes On Me"	Lilly Palmer
  16.	"Wind Up"	Lilly Palmer

=== Singles ===
- "Amnnesia" (2020)
- "You are my guide" (2023)
- "My fantasy" (2024)
- "Hare Ram" (2024)
- "Hype Boy" (2024)
- "Late At Night" with Maddix (2025)
- "Techy MF" (2025)
- "Ayi Giri" / "Dopamine Machine" with Armin van Buuren (2026)
