= I Want U =

Single by Alison Wonderland

from the album Calm Down
- Released: 2 May 2014
- Genre: Trap; hip hop; EDM
- Length: 3:31
- Label: EMI
- Songwriters: Andrew Swanson; Alexandra Sholler

Alison Wonderland singles chronology
"Get Ready" (2013)	"I Want U" (2014)	"Cold" (2014)

"I Want U" is a song by Australian electronic DJ and producer Alison Wonderland. It was released on 2 May 2014 as the lead single from Wonderland's debut extended play studio album, Calm Down. The song peaked at number 38 in Australia and was certified gold in 2016, then platinum in 2018. It was also featured in the video games NBA 2K17, Forza Horizon 3, and Audica. This song was then recently featured on the Netflix television show "The Haunting of Hill House".

== Reception ==
Lachlan Kanoniuk from Beat Magazine described the song as "a tidy banger that doesn't shatter new ground, but hits the crest of previous years' wave of trends." Greg Moskovitch from Music Feed said "[it's] destined to be one of the anthems of season for dance floors nationwide." Stephanie Tell from The Music said the song "is a scintillating beast with a solid, satisfying breakdown to boot." Everett True from The Guardian complemented the track for its "moments of bass pounding", but countered the compliment by saying the vocals are "lacking".

== Charts ==
Chart (2014)	Peak position
Australia (ARIA)	38

== Certifications ==
Region	Certification	Certified units/sales
Australia (ARIA)	Platinum	70,000^{‡}
New Zealand (RMNZ)	Platinum	30,000^{‡}
^{‡} Sales+streaming figures based on certification alone.

== Release history ==
Country	Date	Format	Label
Australia	2 May 2014	Digital download	EMI
