= Quix =

Musician, DJ, and music producer

- Born: Jonathan Paul Fredrick Schnell
- Genres: EDM, trap
- Instruments: DJ, record producer
- Years active: 2016–present
- Labels: Dim Mak Records, Deadbeats

Jonathan Paul Fredrick Schnell, known professionally by his stage name Quix (stylised in all caps), is a New Zealand DJ and electronic music producer.

== Personal life and career ==
Born and raised in Auckland, Schnell grew up in a Christian home. At a young age, his mother home-schooled him for a period of time. He started experimenting with music when he was 9-years-old by playing in bands, and started getting into EDM when he was 14. He adopted the moniker Quix after translating his last name, which means "fast" in German.

In 2017 he dropped his debut EP titled "Heaps Cool". One of his most popular songs is his collaboration with Boombox Cartel "Supernatural", which has received millions of plays and was released on the label Mad Decent. He also has a collab with Alison Wonderland titled "Time".

Schnell considers himself Christian due to his upbringing and currently goes to the Hillsong Church along with his wife Olivia. Since 2020, he has also been a part of the electronic music duo known as Tiger Drool, alongside fellow record producer Vincent.

== Discography ==
=== Extended plays ===
Year	Details
2017	Heaps Cool: Released: May 26, 2017; Label: Dim Mak Records
2018	Illusions: Released: November 9, 2018; Label: Dim Mak Records
2019	IDK, Vol. 1: Released: November 1, 2019; Label: Dim Mak Records
2021	IDK, Vol. 2: Released: June 11, 2021; Label: Lowly
2023	Arpeggio: Released: June 30, 2023; Label: Seedeater Records

=== Singles ===
==== As Quix ====
Year	Title	Album
2015	Sippy Cup (with Troy Kete)	Non-album singles
2015	Stacked (with Dimes)	Non-album singles
2015	House Party (with Thieves)	Non-album singles
2016	What They Want (with Jinco featuring Svnah)	Non-album singles
2016	Pokies	Non-album singles
2016	Supernatural (with Boombox Cartel featuring Anjulie)	Non-album singles
2016	The Cut	Non-album singles
2017	Riot Call (featuring Nevve)	Heaps Cool
2017	Pace (with Loudpvck)	Non-album singles
2017	Skin to Skin (with Bishu featuring Cappa)	Non-album singles
2017	Next World (with Krane)	Fallout
2017	Vision (with Slumberjack featuring Josh Pan)	Non-album singles
2018	I'll Give You the World (featuring Jvmie)	Non-album singles
2018	Lambo (with Matroda)	Non-album singles
2018	Hero (with Vincent featuring David Shane)	Illusions
2018	Giving Up (featuring Jaden Michaels)	Illusions
2019	Stronger (featuring Elanese)	Non-album singles
2019	Berserk (with Luca Lush featuring Yung Bambi)	Non-album singles
2019	Guiding Light (featuring Sanna Martinez)	Non-album singles
2019	Life Long After Death (with Adventure Club featuring BadXChannels)	Non-album singles
2019	Time (with Alison Wonderland)	Non-album singles
2019	Trying to Love (featuring Bjoern)	Non-album singles
2019	I Got Tha	Non-album singles
2020	Survive	Non-album singles
2020	Gunning for You (featuring Nevve)	Non-album singles
2020	Somebody (featuring Alex Hosking)	Non-album singles
2020	Chicane (with Juelz)	Non-album singles
2020	Heads or Tails (with Amba Shepherd)	Non-album singles
2021	Huhhh (VIP)	Non-album singles
2021	Lighthouse	IDK, Vol. 2
2021	Make Up Your Mind (featuring Jaden Michaels)	Non-album singles
2022	Enter with Caution (featuring Alix Robson)	Non-album singles
2022	Pompeii (with Cyclops featuring Crooked Bangs)	Non-album singles
2022	Waiting for the Day (with CORTR featuring Kyle Reynolds)	Non-album singles
2022	Take My Breath Away (featuring Linney)	Non-album singles
2022	Crew (with Savage)	Non-album singles
2023	Drop 'Em (with Sofi)	Non-album singles
2023	Grenade	Arpeggio
2023	Laugh	Arpeggio
2023	Trust	Non-album singles
2023	Wake Up (with Alison Wonderland)	Non-album singles
2025	Greatest (with EMWA)	Non-album singles
2025	PSYCHO (with Alison Wonderland, Erick The Architect, & MEMBA)	Ghost World
2025	Curry Goat (with Solesky)	Non-album singles
2025	Caught Between (with Elipsa)	Non-album singles
2026	Long Legs	Non-album singles
2026	FEAR	Non-album singles

==== As Fredrick ====
Year	Title	Album
2023	The River	Non-album single

==== With Tiger Drool ====
Year	Title	Album
2020	Tiger	Non-album singles
2020	Saber Tooth	Non-album singles
2024	PREY	Non-album singles
