= Calm Down (EP) =

EP by Alison Wonderland
- Released: 27 June 2014
- Length: 17:14
- Label: EMI

Alison Wonderland chronology
Calm Down (2014)	Run (2015)

Singles from Calm Down
- 1. "I Want U" Released: 2 May 2014; 2. "Cold" Released: September 2014

Calm Down is the debut extended play from Australian electronic DJ and producer Alison Wonderland. In an interview with Beat Magazine, Wonderland said, "I wrote all of those songs in a week. I had this huge burst of creativity, got really inspired and just wrote them all." It was released on 27 June 2014 via EMI Music Australia.

== Critical reception ==
Steph Payton from The AU Review gave the EP 9.7 out of 10, saying: "Before even reaching the one minute mark of the first track on Alison Wonderland's debut EP Calm Down you know this is the one you have been waiting for. Wonderland has packed everything that makes her live shows instant sell out's into five incredible songs. Powerful bass, stunning vocals and exciting samples."

Stephanie Tell from The Music gave the EP 3.5 out of 5, saying: "Drawing heavily on Flume, The Knife and M.I.A., Alison Wonderland's ultra-hip Calm Down has a split personality; straddling trashy club and clever EDM. Either way, listeners should find something to love between [the] use of adventurous, solemn strings and punchy, stop-start beats.".

Andrew Le from Renowned for Sound gave the EP 3.5 stars out of 5, calling it a "decent debut".

== Singles ==
"I Want U" was released as the first single on 2 May 2014. The song peaked at number 38 on the ARIA Charts and was certified gold. "Cold" was released as the second single in September 2014.

== Track listing ==
All tracks are written by Alex Scholler.

No.	Title	Length
1.	"Cold"	3:32
2.	"I Want U"	3:31
3.	"Lies"	3:30
4.	"Sugar High" (featuring Djemba Djemba)	3:25
5.	"Space"	3:18
Total length:		17:14

== Release history ==
Country	Date	Format	Label	Catalogue
Australia	27 June 2014	Digital download	EMI	
Australia	11 July 2014	Vinyl	EMI	3785963
United States	11 November 2014	Digital download	Astralwerks	
