= Ghost World (album) =

Studio album by Alison Wonderland
- Released: 5 December 2025
- Length: 43:16
- Label: EMI Australia
- Producer: DJ_Dave; Memba; Ninajirachi; Dylan Ragland; Jonathan Schnell; Alexandra Sholler; Whyte Fang

Alison Wonderland chronology
Loner (2022)	Ghost World (2025)

Singles from Ghost World
- 1. "Get Started" Released: 25 April 2025; 2. "Again? Fuck." Released: 27 June 2025; 3. "Iwannaliveinadream" Released: 1 August 2025; 4. "Psycho" Released: 29 August 2025; 5. "XTC" Released: 3 October 2025; 6. "Floating Away" Released: 14 November 2025; 7. "Heaven" Released: 5 December 2025

Ghost World is the fourth studio album by the Australian DJ and producer Alison Wonderland. It was announced on 1 August 2025, alongside the third single, "Iwannaliveinadream". The album was originally scheduled for release on 3 October 2025 through EMI Music Australia, but due to production delays, the album's release date was pushed to 5 December 2025.

Upon announcement Wonderland said "I often feel like I'm wandering this earth trying to find my home, both artistically and personally. I want people to know that while you're on that search, there is a place of refuge here for you, with us, in Ghost World."

== Reception ==
Triple J said "Blending euphoric beats with gritty, futuristic bass and her signature trap production, Alison goes back to her roots... and invites you into her chaotic mind."

EDM called it "her most personal project yet" saying "melding frenetic bass with fractured emotions while revisiting the heavy-hitting trap that catapulted her career. The result is a transformative album that, while explosive at times, feels intimately honest and fully lived-in."

Steve from Eat This Music said "the album is Alison Wonderland at her most confident and compositionally adventurous, sharpening threads she has teased across the years: introspection, chaos, resilience, defiance, and the relief that comes when the bass finally drops the weight you've been carrying."

== Track listing ==
Ghost World track listing
No.	Title	Writer(s)	Producer(s)	Length
1.	"Ghost World"	Alexandra Sholler; Dylan Ragland	Sholler; Ragland; Jonathan Schnell^{[a]}	2:38
2.	"Get Started"	Sholler; Kella Armitage; Ragland	Sholler; Ragland	2:54
3.	"Iwannaliveinadream"	Sholler; Ragland	Sholler; Ragland	2:45
4.	"Heaven" (with Ninajirachi)	Sholler; Ishaan Chaudhary; William Curry; Nina Wilson	Sholler; Memba; Ninajirachi	3:25
5.	"Call Me (R U Alone?)"	Sholler; Chaudhary; Curry; Genesis Mohanraj	Sholler; Memba	3:16
6.	"Lost & Found" (with Memba)	Sholler; Chaudhary; Curry	Sholler; Memba	2:34
7.	"Everything Comes In Waves"	Sholler; Chaudhary; Curry	Sholler; Memba; Ragland^{[a]}	3:10
8.	"Psycho" (with Erick the Architect, Quix, and Memba)	Sholler; Chaudhary; Curry; Erick Elliott; Mohanraj	Sholler; Schnell; Memba	3:16
9.	"Sirens"	Sholler; Chaudhary; Curry; Wilson	Sholler; Memba; Ninajirachi^{[a]}	3:18
10.	"Voices" (with DJ_Dave)	Sholler; Chaudhary; Curry; Sarah Davis; Gia Koka	Sholler; Memba; DJ_Dave	3:08
11.	"XTC" (with Whyte Fang)	Sholler	Sholler; Whyte Fang; Schnell^{[a]}	2:42
12.	"Again? Fuck."	Sholler; Ragland	Sholler; Ragland	2:50
13.	"Floating Away"	Sholler; Ragland	Sholler; Ragland; Schnell^{[a]}	4:20
14.	"Is This the End?"	Sholler; Ragland	Sholler; Ragland; Trevor Christensen^{[v]}	3:00
Total length:				43:16

=== Note ===
- ^{^[a]} indicates an additional producer.
- ^{^[v]} indicates a vocal producer.

== Personnel ==
Credits adapted from Tidal.

- Alexandra Sholler – mixing (1, 3, 6, 11)
- Jonathan Schnell – mixing (1, 11)
- Tristan Hoogland – mixing (2, 5, 7, 10), vocal engineering (2–7, 9, 10, 12, 14)
- Dylan Ragland – mixing (3)
- Memba – mixing (4, 6, 9)
- Tom Norris – mixing (8, 12, 14)
- Dale Becker – mastering

== Charts ==
Chart performance for Ghost World
Chart (2025)	Peak position
Australian Albums (ARIA)	42
