= Alison Wonderland =

Australian musician (born 1986)

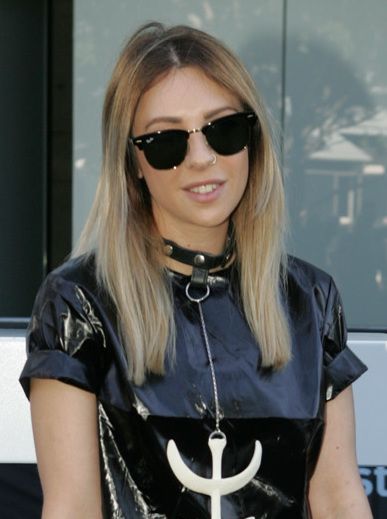
- Wonderland at the ARIA Music Awards in 2013

Background information
- Also known as: Whyte Fang
- Born: Alexandra Margo Sholler; 27 September 1986 (age 40); Sydney, New South Wales, Australia
- Genres: EDM; electropop; chillwave; trap; future bass
- Occupations: DJ; record producer; singer-songwriter
- Instruments: Vocals; bass guitar; keyboards; cello
- Years active: 2008–present
- Labels: EMI; Universal
- Website: alisonwonderland.com

Alexandra Margo Sholler (born 27 September 1986), better known as Alison Wonderland, is an Australian electronic dance music producer, DJ, and singer. Her debut album Run, released on 20 March 2015, peaked at No. 6 on the ARIA Albums Chart and was certified gold by ARIA. Her second album, Awake, debuted at No. 1 on Billboard's Top Dance/Electronic Albums chart. She was listed at No. 96 on DJ Mag's Top 100 DJs in October 2018. She is also the highest billed female DJ in Coachella history. Outside of being well known for her music, she is outspoken about her support for mental health and frequently shares her experiences with her fans.

== Early life ==
Alison Wonderland was born as Alexandra Sholler in 1986. She is of Austrian and Croatian descent. She grew up in Sydney where she trained as a classical musician, specialising in cello. She performed as a cellist with the Sydney Youth Opera and was later a bass guitarist in a few local indie rock bands.

Wonderland later recalled how she developed an interest in electronic dance music, "I went out to a club called Candy's Apartment... Someone played 'Silent Shout' by the Knife... I remember just completely zoning out... and walking over to the DJ and asking, 'What is this track?! Please tell someone what this track is, because this is amazing'." Her performance name is a pun on the Lewis Carroll novel Alice in Wonderland.

== Career ==
=== 2012–2013: Remixing and performing ===
During 2012 she worked as a remixer on Sam Sparro's "I Wish I Never Met You", which appeared as a bonus track on that artist's Japanese version of his second album, Return to Paradise (June 2012). Sneha Dave of Music Feeds observed, "[she] proves once again why she's becoming somewhat of a remix authority. Recently played by none other than Pete Tong on BBC Radio 1, [her] rendition perfectly complements Sparro's creamy vocals. Infused with a deep house sensibility, yet imprinted with original flair, this arrangement depicts exactly what a good remix should be – a tribute to the original."

Also in 2012 Wonderland toured with the Parklife Music Festival, visiting Australian city parks in September to October. Her set list included her remixes, Sparro's "I Wish I Never Met You" and Ladyhawke's "Blue Eyes (Alison Wonderland Remix)". Highlights were presented by Falcona on Vimeo, where she was also interviewed by the Bondi Hipsters. Purple Sneakers' Lauren Payne noticed, Wonderland's version of "Blue Eyes" is "a very digital remix of Ladyhawke's catchy new single. Swapping the guitar and drums for a more electronic vibe, [Wonderland] has make some techno tweaks to the single and the end product is, in true [Wonderland] style, just plain splendiferous!"

=== 2013–2014: "Get Ready" to Calm Down ===
Alison Wonderland released her debut single, "Get Ready" (featuring Fishing), in July 2013. The track was co-written by Sholler with Russell Fitzgibbon, Brendan Picchio and Douglas Wright. Fitzgibbon and Wright perform as a house music duo, Fishing. She was signed to EMI Music Australia in 2014, which is part of Universal Music Australia. As a DJ, she embarked on a national tour playing in warehouses.

On 27 June 2014 her five-track debut extended play, Calm Down, was released. It provided two singles, "I Want U" (May) and "Cold". "I Want U", which was co-written by Sholler with Andrew Swanson (also known as Djemba Djemba), peaked at No. 38 on the ARIA Singles Chart, and was certified gold by ARIA in 2016. It topped the Hype Machine charts as her biggest hit to that time.

=== 2015–2016: Run to "Messiah" ===
In February 2015, Wonderland released "U Don't Know" which featured Wayne Coyne from the Flaming Lips on guest vocals. The music video gained popularity due to Christopher Mintz-Plasse's lead role alongside Wonderland. "U Don't Know" peaked at No. 63 on the ARIA Singles Chart. In March, Wonderland released her debut studio album Run. For the album Wonderland used fellow Australian artists, Slumberjack and SAFIA as well as various producers, Djemba Djemba, Awe, and Lido. It peaked at No. 6 in Australia and No. 12 in New Zealand. K Spence from YourEDM.com praised the album due to its diversity and her involvement in the album, as she was credited as a writer, vocalist and producer. The title track was issued as a single on 11 June, along with its music video. The music video peaked at No. 6 in Australia which made it her biggest hit to date. "Run" had over two-million streams on Spotify as of 20 January 2016.

On 4 August 2015 a video for the album track "Take It to Reality" featuring SAFIA was released On 4 September 2015 Run was released in the United Kingdom. The third and final single, "Games", was issued on 9 September, and was praised by Spence for its lack of trap elements, in which most of Wonderland's music incorporates. The music video was released on the same day and was a one-take scene of Wonderland performing many sports including Grid Iron, Martial Arts and Chess. A deluxe edition of Run was released on 30 October, which included remixes of the singles, "U Don't Know", "I Want U", "Games", "Run" and "Get Ready".

Alison Wonderland was nominated for awards in two categories at the ARIA Music Awards of 2015, Best Dance Release for the single, "Run"; and Best Video for "U Don't Know" featuring Wayne Coyne. The latter was in a category that was publicly voted. She was one of eight nominees to gain exactly two nominations.

Her song "Run" was listed on Triple J Hottest 100, 2015 at No. 59. On 6 February 2016 she previewed a track, "Messiah", at a show, which incorporated more pop elements compared to her earlier material. It was released as a single late in 2016 with Australian hip-hop producer, M-Phazes.

=== 2017–2019: "Happy Place" to Awake ===
On 22 September 2017 Alison Wonderland was named New Artist of the Year at the Electronic Music Awards. On 21 October 2017 she was ranked No. 89 on British magazine, DJ Mag's Top 100 DJs list. On 9 November 2017 she released a track, "Happy Place", ahead of her second album, Awake. Kat Bein of Billboard felt, "[it] purposely plays on the wild ups and downs of mental illness. It opens with airy strings and grounding chimes as Wonderland sings about her struggles to remain in sunny spaces. Tensions grows as the build leads to a jungle gym of clashing noise, landing in one of Wonderland's wildest creations to date." Towards the end of 2017, Alison Wonderland embarked on the "Wonderland Scarehouse Project" local tour, a warehouse show tour through Brisbane, Melbourne, Sydney, and Auckland with support from Lido, Lunice, Party Favor, and A$AP Ferg among others.

On 6 April 2018, Alison Wonderland released her second studio album titled Awake, which debut at #1 on the Billboard Dance/Electronic charts in the USA. That same week she played at Coachella on the Sahara stage, billed as the highest female DJ to date.

In 2019 Alison Wonderland toured extensively in the US, Europe and Australasia, this included headline slots in at huge festivals like EDC Las Vegas and selling out venues like Red Rocks Amphitheatre in Colorado multiple times. She was given an honorable mention in the 2019 Forbes list of richest DJs, the first time for a female.

=== 2020–2024: Loner and Whyte Fang revival ===
She is profiled in the 2020 documentary film Underplayed.

On 23 September 2020, Wonderland released "Bad Things", the first single from her third studio album, Loner. The album was released on 6 May 2022.

In 2021, she revived her side project Whyte Fang, which had been conceived in 2011. The debut album Genesis was released in 2023 through her independent label FMU Records.

=== 2025: Ghost World ===
On 1 August 2025, Wonderland announced her fourth studio album Ghost World would be released in October 2025. It was later delayed to 5 December 2025. The album peaked at number 42 on the ARIA charts.

== Personal life ==
=== Mental health ===
In 2018, Alison Wonderland revealed that she had been struggling with depression and suicidal thoughts, caused by an abusive relationship. She had completely lost her appetite for food and social interaction with others, and attempted suicide at one point. Writing the lyrics for her 2017 album Awake was therapeutic. In 2019, she decided to cancel multiple shows in Europe to focus on her mental health after consulting her managers and personal doctors, with overwhelming support from both numerous fellow DJs, EDM artists and fans alike.

=== Relationships ===
In June 2023, Alison Wonderland gave birth to a son with the American filmmaker Ti West. On Halloween in 2024 she married West in Las Vegas.

On 7 August 2025, she announced via Instagram that she was pregnant with her second child. During a Billboard interview in November 2025, she revealed that she had suffered a miscarriage the previous December.

== Discography ==
- Run (2015)
- Awake (2018)
- Loner (2022)
- Ghost World (2025)

== Awards and nominations ==
=== ARIA Music Awards ===
The ARIA Music Awards is an annual awards ceremony that recognises excellence, innovation, and achievement across all genres of Australian music.

Year	Nominee / work	Award	Result	Ref.
2025	"U Don't Know" (directed by Prad Senanayake)	Best Video	Nominated	
2025	"Run"	Best Dance Release	Nominated	
2018	Awake	Best Female Artist	Nominated	
2018	Awake	Best Dance Release	Nominated	

=== Electronic Dance Music Awards ===
The Electronic Dance Music Awards (also known as the EDMAs) is an annual music award event focusing across most all electronic dance music genres. It commenced in 2022.

Year	Nominee / work	Award	Result	Ref.
2022	Herself	Female Artist of the Year	Won	
2025	"Satellite" (with Dimension)	Music Video of the Year	Nominated	
2025	"Satellite" (with Dimension)	Drum and Bass Song of the Year	Nominated	
2026	Herself	Female Artist of the Year	Won	
2026	"Psycho" — Alison Wonderland, Erick the Architect, QUIX, MEMBA	Music Video of the Year	Nominated	
2026	"Psycho" — Alison Wonderland, Erick the Architect, QUIX, MEMBA	Main Stage/Festival Song of the Year	Nominated	
2026	Ghost World	Favourite Album	Nominated	

=== J Awards ===
The J Awards are an annual series of Australian music awards that were established by the Australian Broadcasting Corporation's youth-focused radio station Triple J. They commenced in 2005.

Year	Nominee / work	Award	Result	Ref.
2015	Run	Australian Album of the Year	Nominated	

=== National Live Music Awards ===
The National Live Music Awards (NLMAs) are a broad recognition of Australia's diverse live industry, celebrating the success of the Australian live scene. The awards commenced in 2016-2020, 2023 and 2026.

Year	Nominee / work	Award	Result	Ref.
2016	Herself	Live Electronic Act (or DJ) of the Year	Nominated	

=== Rolling Stone Australia Awards ===
The Rolling Stone Australia Awards are awarded annually in January or February by the Australian edition of Rolling Stone magazine for outstanding contributions to popular culture in the previous year. It ran from 2010-2015 and 2021-2025

Year	Nominee / work	Award	Result	Ref.
2023	Alison Wonderland	Rolling Stone Global Award	Nominated	

== See also ==
- List of female electronic musicians
