= Genesys II =

2024 studio album by Anyma

Studio album by Anyma
- Released: March 29, 2024
- Genre: Melodic techno
- Label: Afterlife; Interscope
- Producer: Anyma

Anyma chronology
Genesys (2023)	Genesys II (2024)	The End of Genesys (2025)

Genesys II is the second studio album by Italian-American electronic music producer and DJ Anyma (Matteo Milleri). It was released on 29 March 2024 through Afterlife and Interscope Records. Serving as the second installment in his Genesys trilogy, the project follows his highly successful 2023 debut album, Genesys. The album is structured as a conceptual double project, with the first disc featuring brand-new original productions and the second disc consisting of remixes of tracks from the original Genesys album by various prominent electronic artists.

== Background and production ==
Following the commercial success and massive touring schedule surrounding his debut album, Anyma continued to expand his immersive audiovisual universe revolving around the humanoid character "EVA" and themes of artificial intelligence. Genesys II was conceptualized not only as a continuation of this narrative but also as a bridge between his original works and the broader electronic music community.

The first half of the album focuses on new melodic techno tracks, featuring collaborations with artists such as Chris Avantgarde, Rebūke, Argy, and PARISI. Notable singles from this section include "Pictures of You" and "Higher Power". The second half serves as a remix album, bringing in heavyweights of the techno and house scenes—including Eric Prydz, Amelie Lens, Kölsch, and Adriatique—to reinterpret Anyma's previous hits like "Consciousness", "Welcome To The Opera", and "Syren".

== Release ==
Genesys II was officially released on 29 March 2024. Alongside standard digital streaming and download formats, a special limited edition 4-LP vinyl set was made available through the Interscope and Anyma webstores. The release coincided with Anyma's growing presence at major global festivals and set the stage for his subsequent residency at the Sphere in Las Vegas, where tracks from Genesys II were prominently featured alongside his signature CGI visuals.

== Track listing ==
Disc 1: Original Tracks
No.	Title	Writer(s)	Producer(s)	Length
1.	"Sacrifice" (with PARISI)	Matteo Milleri, Giampaolo Parisi, Marco Parisi	Anyma, PARISI	3:00
2.	"Now Or Never"	Matteo Milleri	Anyma	3:15
3.	"The Light"	Matteo Milleri	Anyma	3:10
4.	"Simulation" (with Chris Avantgarde)	Matteo Milleri, Christian Vornweg	Anyma, Chris Avantgarde	3:33
5.	"Pictures Of You"	Matteo Milleri	Anyma	3:15
6.	"Higher Power" (with Argy and MAGNUS)	Matteo Milleri, Argyris Theofilis, Magnus Klausen	Anyma, Argy	3:34
7.	"F.T.L."	Matteo Milleri	Anyma	3:00
8.	"Hear Me Now" (with Rebūke and Karin Park)	Matteo Milleri, Reuben Keeney, Karin Park	Anyma, Rebūke	3:20
9.	"Exodus" (with Adam Sellouk)	Matteo Milleri, Adam Sellouk	Anyma, Adam Sellouk	3:33
10.	"After Love" (featuring Delilah Montagu)	Matteo Milleri, Delilah Montagu	Anyma	3:20

Disc 2: Remixes
No.	Title	Writer(s)	Producer(s)	Length
1.	"Eternity" (Massano Remix)	Matteo Milleri, Christian Vornweg	Anyma, Chris Avantgarde, Sam Massano	4:44
2.	"Pictures Of You" (Cassian Remix)	Matteo Milleri	Anyma, Cassian Stewart-Kasimba	4:05
3.	"The Sign" (Kevin de Vries Remix)	Matteo Milleri, Dave Whelan, Mike Di Scala	Anyma, CamelPhat, Kevin de Vries	4:30
4.	"Welcome To The Opera" (Adriatique Remix)	Matteo Milleri, Claire Boucher	Anyma, Adrian Shala, Adrian Schweizer	4:10
5.	"Syren" (Adam Sellouk Remix)	Matteo Milleri, Reuben Keeney	Anyma, Rebūke, Adam Sellouk	4:06
6.	"Save Me" (Goom Gum & Stylo Remix)	Matteo Milleri, Sevda Alizadeh	Anyma, Goom Gum, Nir Ovadia	4:10
7.	"Consciousness" (Eric Prydz Remix)	Matteo Milleri, Christian Vornweg	Anyma, Chris Avantgarde, Eric Prydz	5:45
8.	"Save Me" (Kölsch Remix)	Matteo Milleri, Sevda Alizadeh	Anyma, Rune Reilly Kölsch	5:20
9.	"Syren" (Amelie Lens Remix)	Matteo Milleri, Reuben Keeney	Anyma, Rebūke, Amelie Lens	4:30
10.	"Welcome To The Opera" (Kobosil 44 Symbiont Mix)	Matteo Milleri, Claire Boucher	Anyma, Max Kobosil	4:45
