= Anyma =

Italian and American DJ and producer (born 1988)

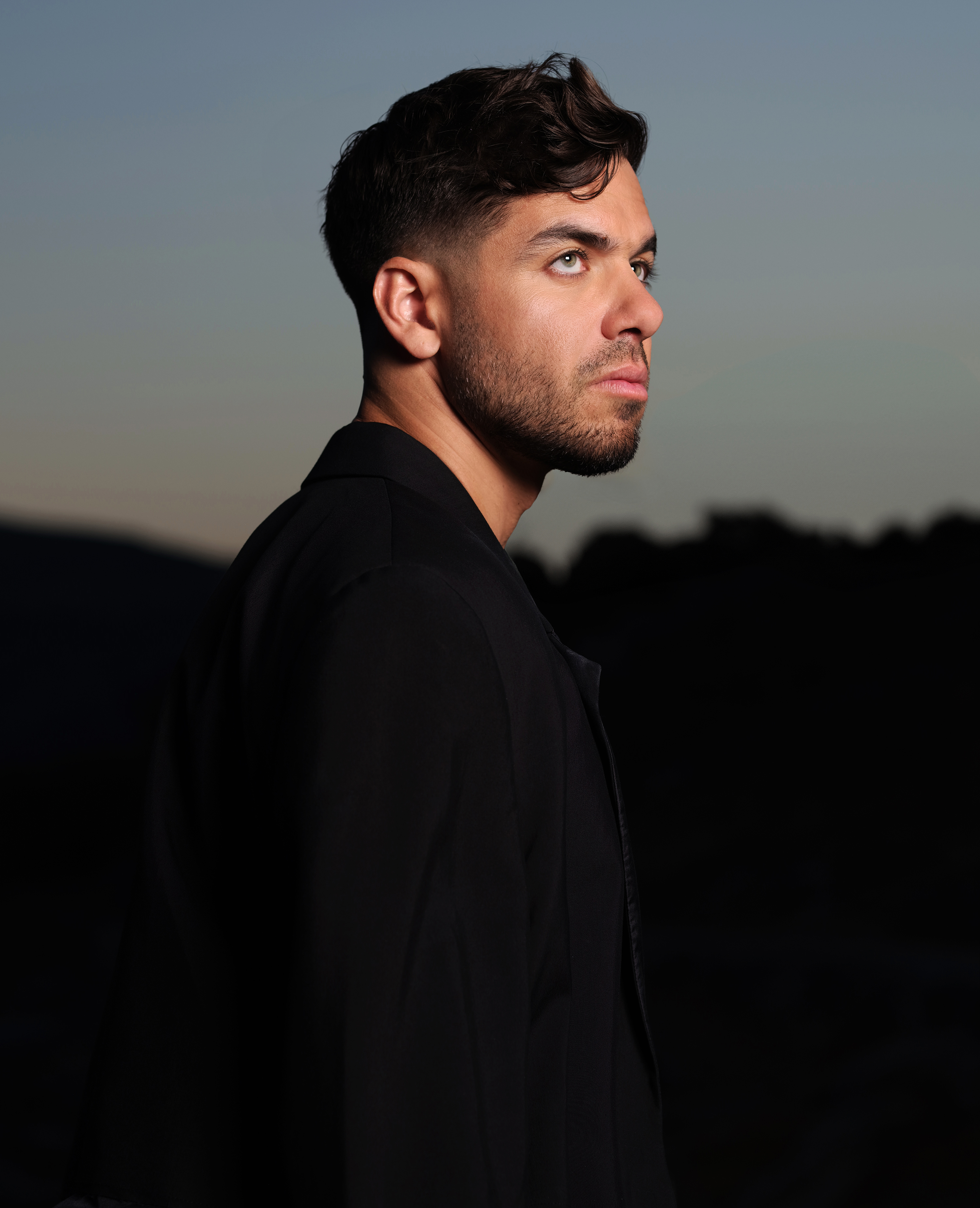
- Matteo Milleri in 2021

Background information
- Born: Matteo Milleri; May 19, 1988 (age 38); New York City, U.S.
- Origin: Berlin, Germany
- Genres: Melodic techno; melodic house; progressive house
- Occupations: Music producer; DJ
- Years active: 2011–present
- Labels: Afterlife Recordings; Interscope
- Member of: Tale of Us
- Spouse: Vittoria Ceretti (m. 2020; div. 2023)
- Partner: Grimes (2024–2025)
- Website: anyma.com

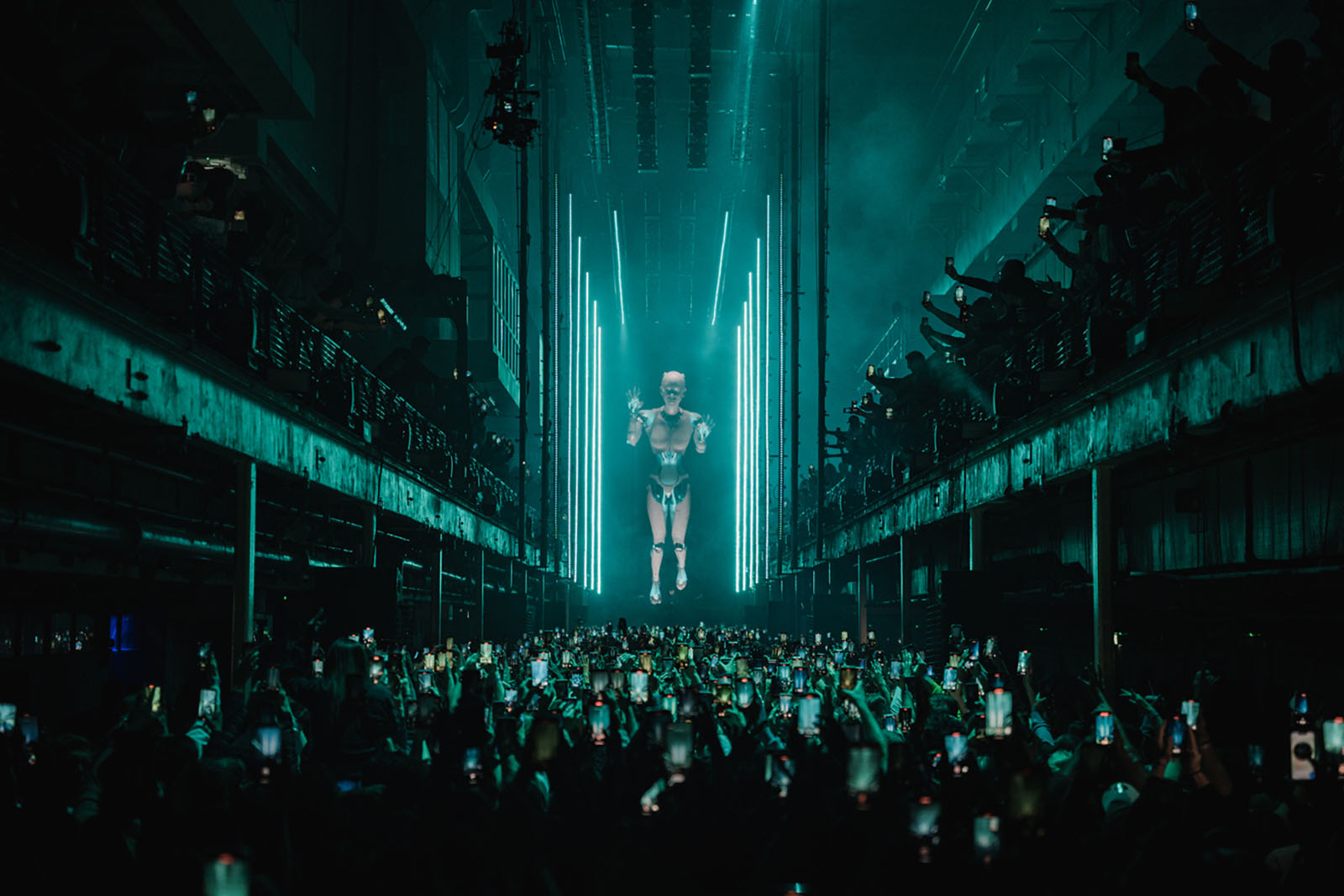
Afterlife projection, November 2022

Matteo Milleri, known as Anyma, is an Italian-American DJ, electronic music producer, and artist. His music is associated with melodic techno. He is a member of the duo Tale of Us and co-founder of the music platform Afterlife.

Anyma's debut EP, Sentient, was released in June 2021 by Afterlife. The following month, he released the EP Claire through Rose Avenue Records. His debut album, Genesys, was released in 2023; the trilogy was continued with Genesys II in 2024 and concluded with The End of Genesys in 2025. Anyma has collaborated with artists including Grimes, Sevdaliza, Ellie Goulding, Yeat, Lana Del Rey, FKA Twigs, and GEM.

== History ==
=== Tale of Us ===
Milleri rose to prominence in electronic music as one half of the Italian-American DJ and production duo Tale of Us, formed with Carmine Conte, known professionally as MRAK. The two met while studying music production at the SAE Institute in Milan and later settled in Berlin.

The duo made their debut in 2011 with the EP Dark Song, released by Visionquest, and went on to release music through labels including M_nus and R&S Records. In 2016, Milleri and Conte founded Afterlife, initially as an event series launched in Barcelona that later developed into a record label.

In 2017, Tale of Us released their debut studio album, Endless, through Deutsche Grammophon. The album incorporated elements of ambient and classical music into the duo's electronic sound.

In August 2023, Afterlife entered into a partnership with Interscope Records focused on the distribution and international development of the label's releases.

=== 2021: Solo debut ===
In May 2021, Matteo Milleri introduced Anyma, his solo electronic music and digital art project.

The project's debut EP, Sentient, was released on June 4, 2021, by Afterlife Records. The EP consists of four tracks, including "Reminding", featuring German singer Rosa Anschütz.

On July 16, 2021, Anyma released his second EP, Claire, through Rose Avenue Records. The release contains three tracks and features collaborations with Janus Rasmussen and Delhia de France on the title track. The title track was accompanied by a high-definition NFT music video created by Berlin-based artist Marigoldff in collaboration with the studio IOR50.

=== 2022–2023: Genesys ===
The project's first full-length album, Genesys, was released on 11 August 2023. It consisted of 14 tracks and featured guest artists such as Grimes, Sevdaliza, Chris Avantgarde, Rebūke, and CamelPhat. Exploring themes of artificial intelligence, humanity, and their coexistence, the concept album became highly successful, making Anyma the number-one selling artist on Beatport in 2023. The record also achieved international chart success, peaking at number five on the UK Official Dance Albums Chart. Several singles from the album became hits within the melodic techno scene, particularly "Consciousness", "Eternity", and "Welcome to the Opera", a collaboration with Grimes released in June 2023.

Anyma integrated CGI and digital art into his live sets, collaborating with visual artist Alessio De Vecchi to expand the narrative of "EVA", a humanoid robot character that became the visual centerpiece of his shows. The artist's 2023 live appearances included a set on Tomorrowland's Freedom Stage, in Belgium.

=== 2024–2025: Genesys II, The End of Genesys, and Sphere residency ===
On 29 March 2024, Anyma published his second studio album, Genesys II, on Afterlife/Interscope Records. The 21-track release included collaborations with PARISI, Karin Park, and others, as well as remixes from Eric Prydz, Kölsch, Amelie Lens, Daniel Avery, and up-and-coming artists from the Afterlife label.

Anyma's live appearances in 2024 included Coachella, Tomorrowland, Always Live in Melbourne, Australia, and Ataköy Marina Arena in Istanbul, Turkey.

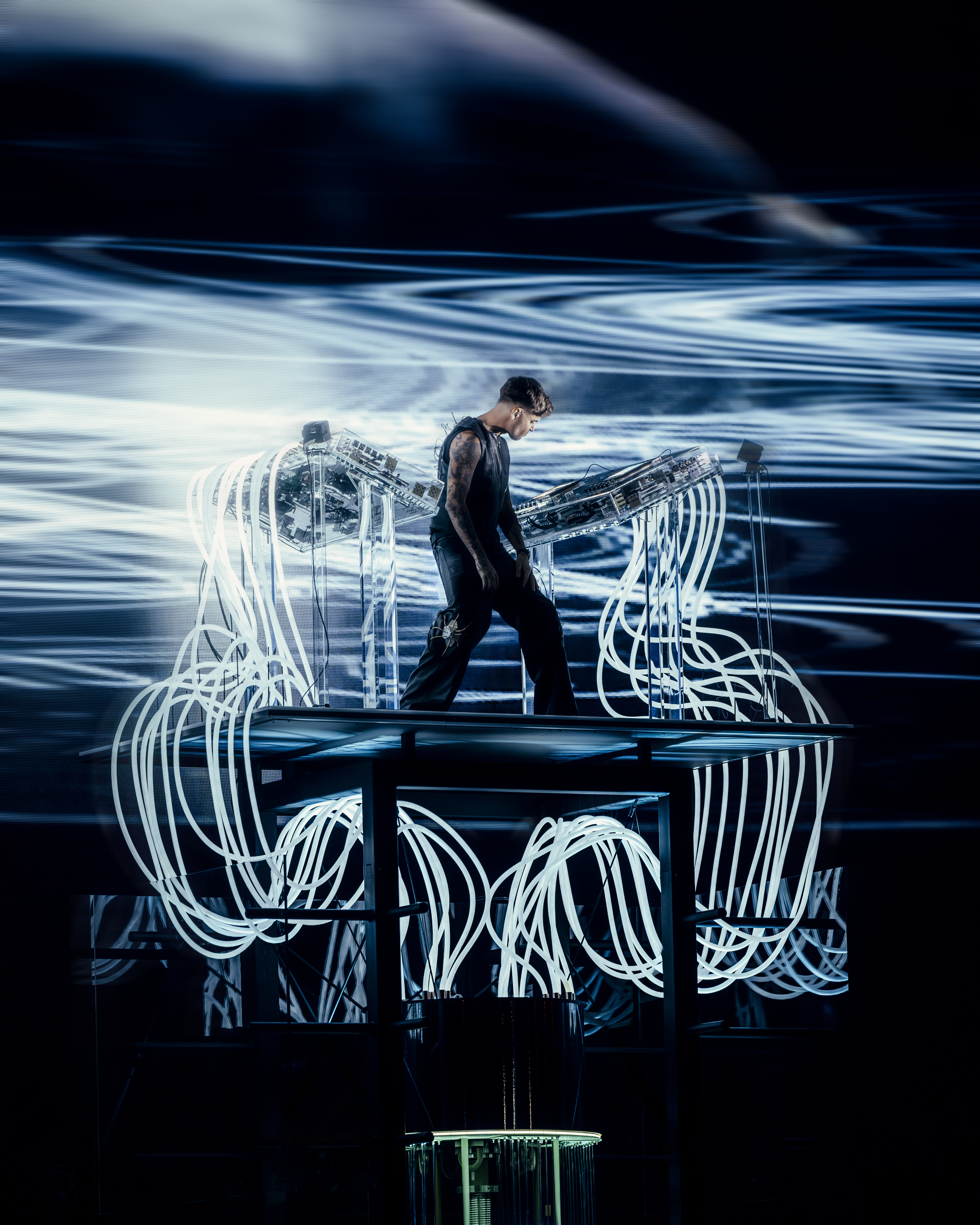
Anyma at Las Vegas Sphere, 2024

On 15 July, it was announced that Milleri would be heading a residency, "Afterlife presents Anyma: The End of Genesys", at Sphere in Las Vegas, from late December to early 2025. He was the first electronic artist ever booked at the venue. 100,000 tickets for the first six shows were reported to have sold in 24 hours.

Four shows in February and March 2025 were added to the original eight-day run.

Guest artists at the residency included Ellie Goulding, FKA Twigs, John Summit, Grimes, Luke Steele, and Yeat, whose appearance was the first by a rapper at the venue.

On 10 January 2025, Anyma released "Hypnotized", a collaboration with Ellie Goulding, as the lead single from his upcoming third studio album. The track was met with widespread acclaim from critics. "Hypnotized" reached No. 1 on the Dance/Mix Show Airplay chart, becoming Anyma's first No. 1 single on any Billboard chart. On 14 February, he released "Voices in My Head" with Argy and Son of Son, as the album's second single. During the last show of his residency, Milleri confirmed that his upcoming album would be titled The End of Genesys and would come out on 23 May. On 25 March, it was reported that Milleri had signed a global publishing deal with Kobalt Music Group.

Anyma performed back-to-back sets with Solomun at Ultra Music Festival's 25th edition in March 2025, and appeared with Yeat at Coachella 2025. Other 2025 bookings have included Tomorrowland, the Sziget Festival in Budapest, Hungary, Zurich Open Air in Switzerland, and Rock en Seine in France.

In 2025, Anyma was listed in the top ten of DJ Mag's Top 100 DJs list for the first time. He also performed at the 2025 League of Legends World Championship final in China, where he served as a co-director of the opening ceremony. Anyma provided a remix of the tournament's official song, "Sacrifice", performed by G.E.M. during the event.

=== 2026: ÆDEN ===
On 11 February 2026, Anyma officially announced the ÆDEN World Tour, his new global tour, which was described by his publicists as a fusion of science-fiction futurism and ancient mythology, marking a creative evolution beyond the Genesys era. The tour was set to debut with his closing performances at Coachella before visiting twelve countries across Asia, the Middle East, Australia, and Europe, concluding in Paris in December. Alongside the tour, a new summer residency at [UNVRS] in Ibiza, also titled ÆDEN, was confirmed for Tuesdays between June and September, following a sold-out 2025 season.

On 3 April 2026, Anyma released "Beautiful", a collaboration with singer Joji through Interscope Records. The track is built around synthesized textures and explores themes of digital intimacy, memory, and fleeting love. Days later, on 8 April, he released "Bad Angel", a collaboration with Lisa of Blackpink, also through Interscope. It was described as a melodic techno-pop track about autonomy and transformation. According to Anyma, the collaboration emerged from conversations in which the two artists "found common ground" between their musical and visual worlds.

The debut performance of the ÆDEN show was scheduled for the first weekend of Coachella 2026 on 17 April, but was cancelled hours beforehand due to strong winds that prevented the stage from being assembled safely. Anyma instead performed a last-minute DJ set at the Do LaB stage. The show was rescheduled for the festival's second weekend, when ÆDEN made its world premiere on the main stage. The performance combined elaborate stage production with classically inspired imagery, including digital columns that collapsed and reassembled, animated sculptures, and Medusa-like serpent figures. It featured guest appearances by Lisa, performing "Bad Angel"; Joji, performing "Beautiful"; Swae Lee; and Matt Bellamy of Muse. Billboard described the show as "an expansion of the considerable world-building Anyma has already accomplished".

Discussing the concept behind ÆDEN, Anyma told DJ Mag that the project follows "an intelligence sent to the digital cloud, which I call ÆDEN, in search of immortality, to see whether it is possible to upload the mind and remain human". He described the work as a reflection on the "synergy or symbiosis between humans, machines and nature".

The ÆDEN World Tour's first date outside Coachella took place on 2 May 2026 at Sunland Boundless Park in Shanghai. The event drew approximately 25,000 attendees and was described by the specialist press as the largest electronic-music headline show ever held in China. The tour subsequently visited Brussels on 6 June; London on 27 and 28 June at Silverworks Island; Beirut on 10 July; Gdańsk on 7 and 8 August; Mexico City on 22 August; Vancouver on 29 August; Istanbul on 12 September; Milan on 19 September; Madrid on 26 September; Sydney on 17 October; Athens on 31 October; and Mumbai on 21 November.

Alongside the tour, Anyma resumed his summer residency at [UNVRS] in Ibiza with the ÆDEN show, held on Tuesdays from 9 June to 15 September 2026, following the sold-out 2025 season.

On 14 August 2026, Anyma announced the launch of his own record label, ÆDEN Records, distributed by Interscope/Virgin. The label was introduced with the single "Other Dimension", a collaboration with Brazilian producer Volkoder. According to Anyma, "building a community of artists and creatives has always been an important goal" throughout his artistic career.

On 28 August 2026, the label released its debut compilation album, ÆDEN: Digital Renaissance Vol. I, featuring 15 tracks and collaborations with Argy & 7 Skies, Stylo, Q.U.A.K.E, Eli & Dani, Jast, Kevin de Vries & Platero, Volkoder, Massano & Humans Musik, Skuro & Final Request, Pacs & Moonphazes, SLVR, Colyn, 19:26 & Baset, and Goom Gum. It also included tracks by Anyma himself, including the opening song "Atoma" and a remix of the Prodigy's "No Good" with Stylo. Beatportal described the project as "a focused snapshot of the sound and philosophy that will guide ÆDEN", quoting Anyma as saying that it is "broad and multi-genre, but always with a melodic core at its heart".

== Artistry ==
Anyma's sound is influenced by melodic house and techno, with elements of ambient, electronica, and classical music.

His live performances are designed to create a sonic and visual landscape that allows the audience to interact with the digital art and music.

=== Visual arts and fashion ===
In 2023, Milleri collaborated with the Milan fashion collective 44 Label Group on a "capsule collection" meant to reflect "the seamless synergy between music and fashion". In 2024, he was the visual creative director for the Weeknd's One Night Only concert in São Paulo, Brazil, with Alessio De Vecchi serving as art director for the visuals.

== Personal life ==
Matteo Milleri was born in New York City and spent part of his youth in Italy. He is the son of Italian businessman Francesco Milleri, chairman and chief executive officer of EssilorLuxottica.

Milleri met Carmine Conte in Milan while studying music production at the SAE Institute. They later formed the electronic music duo Tale of Us.

On June 1, 2020, Milleri married Italian model Vittoria Ceretti in Ibiza. Their separation was later discussed by Ceretti in an interview with Vogue Italia.

In March 2024, Milleri publicly confirmed his relationship with musician Grimes. In August 2025, People reported that the couple had separated but remained friends and continued to collaborate professionally.

In 2026, Milleri was reported to be in a relationship with Northern Irish model Stella Maxwell. Maxwell also appeared as part of the visual presentation associated with Anyma's ÆDEN project.

== Discography ==
=== Studio albums ===
- Genesys (2023)
- Genesys II (2024)
- The End of Genesys (2025)

=== EPs ===
Title	Details	Ref.
Sentient	Released: 4 June 2021; Label: Afterlife Recordings; Format: Digital download, streaming	
Claire	Released: 16 July 2021; Label: Afterlife Recordings; Format: Digital download, streaming	

=== Singles ===
Title	Year	Peak chart positions										Album
Title	Year	US Dance Air.	US D/E	CIS Air.	EST Air.	LAT Air. (Note: Both Latvian Music Producers Association and TopHit provides airplay charts for Latvia. Since 2023, LaIPA airplay chart has only 20 positions, for this reason the peaks below Top 20 are taken from TopHit Latvian airplay chart.)	LTU Air.	NZ Hot	RUS Air.	UKR Air.	UK Down.	Album
"Claire" (with Janus Rasmussen featuring Delhia De France)	2021	—	—	—	—	—	—	—	—	—	—	Claire
"Lightning Over Heaven" (with Amelie Lens)	2021	—	—	—	—	—	—	—	—	—	—	Non-album singles
"Walking"	2021	—	—	—	—	—	—	—	—	—	—	Non-album singles
"Running" (with Meg Myers)	2021	—	—	—	—	—	—	—	—	—	97	Non-album singles
"Welcome to the Opera" (with Grimes)	2022	—	35	—	—	—	—	—	—	—	—	Genesys
"Consciousness" (with Chris Avantgarde and Eric Prydz)	2022	—	—	—	—	—	—	—	—	—	—	Genesys
"The Sign" (with CamelPhat)	2022	—	—	—	—	—	—	—	—	—	—	Genesys
"Eternity" (with Chris Avantgarde)	2023	—	—	—	—	—	—	—	—	—	—	Genesys
"Explore Your Future"	2023	—	—	—	—	—	—	—	—	—	—	Genesys
"Syren" (with Rebūke)	2023	—	—	—	—	—	—	—	—	—	—	Genesys
"Higher Power" (with Argy and Magnus)	2023	—	—	—	—	—	—	—	—	—	—	Genesys II
"Simulation" (with Chris Avantgarde)	2023	—	—	—	—	—	—	—	—	—	—	Genesys II
"Pictures of You"	2024	—	—	—	—	—	—	—	—	—	—	Genesys II
"Angel in the Dark" (with Massano and Nathan Nicholson)	2024	—	—	—	—	—	132	—	—	—	—	The End of Genesys
"Hypnotized" (with Ellie Goulding)	2025	1	5	56	4	10	7	12	108	54	25	The End of Genesys
"Voices in My Head" (with Argy and Son of Son)	2025	—	—	—	—	—	—	—	—	—	—	The End of Genesys
"Neverland (from Japan)" (with Baset)	2025	—	—	—	—	—	—	—	—	—	—	The End of Genesys
"Work" (with Yeat)	2025	—	—	—	—	—	—	—	—	—	—	The End of Genesys
"Out of My Body" (featuring Ejae)	2025	16	—	24	—	89	—	—	21	31	—	The End of Genesys (Deluxe)
"Beautiful" (with Joji)	2026	—	13	—	—	—	32	14	—	66	—	Non-album singles
"Bad Angel" (with Lisa)	2026	—	8	—	—	—	—	21	—	—	85	Non-album singles
"Other Dimension" (with Volkoder)	2026	—	—	—	—	—	—	—	—	—	—	Non-album singles
"Prophecy" (with 19:26 and Baset)	2026	—	—	99	—	—	—	—	—	79	—	Non-album singles
"Atoma"	2026	—	—	—	—	—	—	—	—	61	—	Non-album singles
"—" denotes a recording that did not chart or was not released in that territory.

=== Remixes ===
Title	Year	Peak chart positions		Album
Title	Year	LTU Air.	UKR Air.	Album
"My Only Love" (Moby; Tale of Us and Anyma Remix)	2020	—	—	Non-album single
"Running Up That Hill (A Deal with God)" (Kate Bush; Anyma Remix)	2021	—	—	Non-album single
"Alive" (Rüfüs Du Sol; Anyma Remix)	2021	—	—	Surrender
"My City's on Fire" (Jimi Jules; Anyma and Cassian Remix)	2023	—	—	Non-album singles
"Say Yes to Heaven" (Lana Del Rey; Anyma Remix)	2023	—	—	Non-album singles
"Time's a Fantasy" (Portugal. The Man and Jeff Bhasker; Anyma Remix)	2023	52	55	Non-album singles
"Black Dress" (070 Shake; Anyma Remix)	2023	—	—	Non-album singles
"Last Night" (Loofy; Anyma and Layton Giordani Remix)	2024	—	—	Non-album singles
"Eusexua" (FKA Twigs; Anyma Remix)	2024	—	—	Eusexua
"Move" (Adam Port, Stryv and Malachiii; Anyma & Cassian Remix)	2025	—	—	Non-album singles
"Dreamin'" (Dom Dolla and Daya; Anyma Remix)	2025	—	—	Non-album singles
"—" denotes a recording that did not chart or was not released in that territory.
