= Rampa (DJ) =

German DJ and record producer (born 1982)

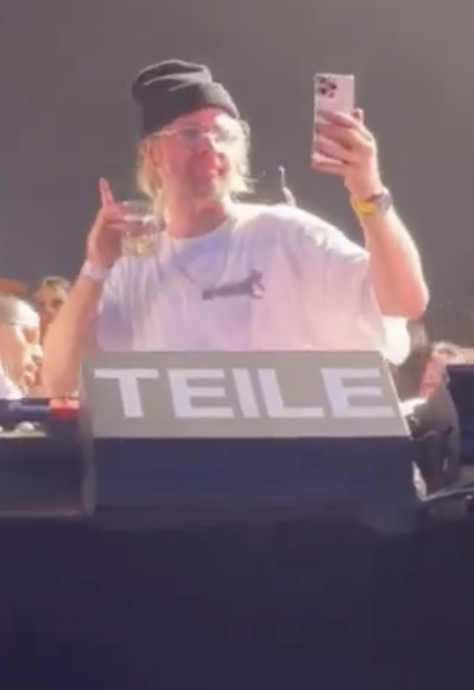
- Sütterlin in 2025

Background information
- Born: Gregor Sütterlin; 25 July 1982 (age 44); Freiburg im Breisgau, Germany
- Genres: Afrobeats; melodic house; melodic techno
- Occupations: DJ; record producer
- Years active: 2009—present
- Label: Keinemusik

Gregor Sütterlin (born 25 July 1982), better known as Rampa, is a German DJ and record producer based in Berlin. He is a founding member of the Keinemusik collective.

== Biography ==
Gregor Sütterlin was born on 25 August 1979, in Freiburg im Breisgau, in the southwestern foothills of the Black Forest in Germany. He started playing drums and then got into DJing when he was 12, with the help of his best friend's older brother. By the time Sütterlin turned 15, he started making his own music in Fruity Loops on his Microsoft desktop.

In 2004, Sütterlin relocated to the country's capital, Berlin, and in 2009, he co-founded the independent record label and collective Keinemusik, alongside &Me, Adam Port, David Mayer, Reznik, and Monja Gentschow. He thought of the record label as "his own little d.i.y.-cosmos."

At the peak of his live career, in 2016, Sütterlin took a six-month hiatus due to "creative burnout and a lack of enthusiasm", and spent more time in the studio. That same year, Sütterlin, along with collaborator Benjamin Hughes, founded Teile, a company dedicated to designing and building analogue effects units for DJs and producers. After his hiatus, he started playing no more than four shows a month, saying, "I'm taking a slower approach, focusing on 'less is more'. Maybe that's what people are hearing."

In 2026, Sütterlin collaborated with French-Swiss conceptual artist Julian Charrière, and French musician and former member of Daft Punk, Thomas Bangalter, to present Warehouse Artefacts, an art installation that took place during Art Basel at Messe Basel. The collaboration integrated the experience into the broader cultural agenda of the fair, linking modern art with electronic music in a common environment. During the daytime, the installation was staged as a deconstructed dance floor that "brings together transmissions from both political history and underground culture." The installation unfolded into a rave at night, with a DJ set led by Sütterlin and a "special guest", whom of which was Bangalter.

== Musical style ==
Sütterlin's musical style blends Afrobeats, house, techno, and disco, and is characterized by warm, vocal-centric grooves, heavy percussion, and unpredictable breaks.

== Discography ==
=== Studio albums ===
- 2010: Inside
- 2012: My Life
- 2017: You Are Safe (with Adam Port & &Me)
- 2022: Send Return (with Keinemusik)

=== EPs ===
- 2016: Trust
- 2019: They Will
- 2022: Send Return Remixes Pt. 1 (with u. a. &Me, Adam Port, Keinemusik)
- 2023: Send Return Remixes Pt. 2 (with u. a. &Me, Adam Port, Keinemusik)
- 2023: Send Return Remixes Pt. 3 (with u. a. &Me, Adam Port, Keinemusik)

=== Singles ===
- 2009: "Wife & Man"
- 2011: "Our Thing"
- 2011: "Feet"
- 2012: "The Track"
- 2013: "Enemy"
- 2014: "Keep House"
- 2015: "Good Times Roll"
- 2015: "Potty"
- 2016: "Spoken For"
- 2017: "The Touch"
- 2017: "Hall of Violence"
- 2017: "Doppelgänger 01" (with &Me & Adam Port)
- 2018: "Sunday"
- 2021: "Abu Simbel"
- 2021: "The Church"
- 2021: "Discoteca" (with &Me, Adam Port & Sofie Royer)
- 2021: "Before the Flood" (with &Me, Adam Port & Cubicolor)
- 2021: "Confusion" (with &Me, Adam Port & Ali Love)
- 2021: "Saving My Love" (with &Me, Adam Port & Little Dragon)
- 2022: "Everyday"
- 2024: "Thandaza" (with &Me, Adam Port, Alan Dixon & Arabic Piano)
- 2024: "Say What" (with Adam Port, &Me, chuala & Keinemusik)
- 2025: "See You Again" (with &Me, Adam Port, Keinemusik & Sevdaliza)
