= Marzec =

Marzec is a Polish surname meaning "March".

Notable people with the surname include:

- Luke Marzec, British musician
- Mateusz Marzec, Polish footballer
- Piotr Marzec (born 1971), Polish rapper and politician
- Ryszard Marzec (1931–1972), Polish field hockey player
