= Hypnotized (Anyma and Ellie Goulding song) =

2025 single

Single by Anyma and Ellie Goulding

from the album The End of Genesys
- Released: 10 January 2025
- Genre: Dance-pop; melodic techno
- Length: 3:00
- Label: Interscope
- Songwriters: Ellie Goulding; Jack Rochon; Scott Harris; Matteo Milleri; Cassian Stewart-Kasimba
- Producers: Cassian Stewart-Kasimba; Matteo Milleri

Anyma singles chronology
"Eusexua" (remix) (2024)	"Hypnotized" (2025)	"Voices in My Head" (2025)

Ellie Goulding singles chronology
"I Adore You" (remix) (2024)	"Hypnotized" (2025)	"Save My Love" (2025)

Music video
- "Hypnotized" on YouTube

"Hypnotized" is a song by Italian-American electronic musician and DJ Anyma and English singer-songwriter Ellie Goulding. It was released on 10 January 2025 under Afterlife, a division of Interscope Records. Anyma debuted the track during his set at the Sphere residency in Las Vegas, which included visuals of Goulding's face projected in the sphere. The performance gained attraction, and the song release became highly anticipated.

== Background and composition ==
In an interview with Rolling Stone, Anyma said that the entire making process of the song felt "so natural" thanks to Goulding's "voice" and "creativity" input, despite this being the first time they work together. Goulding expressed admiration for Anyma for being able to understand "the nuances of my vocals and how I wanted to approach the track".

"Collaborating on 'Hypnotized' with Anyma has been an incredibly enriching and wildly exciting ride" ... "He is a creative visionary with an unmatched ability to marry sound and visual art in a way no one else can. ... Joining him at the Sphere in Las Vegas to bring the song to life felt like an immersive fever dream that I won't soon forget."

— Goulding on working with Anyma, via Rolling Stone

Christian Eede of DJ Mag stated that the track is a "melodic techno cut", describing the lyrical content as a showcase of fighting with our "internal feelings for someone", only for those feelings "to grow stronger" as we attempt to hide them. "Hypnotized" was written by Goulding, Jack Rochon, Scott Harris, Anyma, and Cassian Stewart-Kasimba, with the last two producing the track.

== Release and promotion ==
The pair performed "Hypnotized" live on stage for the first time during Anyma's second night at his Sphere residency. The visuals used at Anyma's show were released alongside the song on January 10, on Anyma's YouTube channel. DJ and producer, John Summit started teasing a remix for the song the day after its release, with Goulding reposting Summit teasers on her social media accounts. The official remix was released on February 28. The live performance at the Sphere was officially released on January 24, on Goulding's YouTube channel.

== Commercial performance ==
In Europe, "Hypnotized" entered inside the top ten on airplay in four countries: Estonia, Czech Republic, Lithuania, and Latvia, peaking at number four, eight, nine and ten, respectively. In the United States, the song debuted at twenty-nine on the Dance/Mix Show Airplay for the week dated February 1, 2025, eventually reaching the top spot on the week dated March 8, 2025; it became Anyma's first and Goulding's eight number-one hit. Furthermore, it made Goulding the second female artist with most chart-toppers on the chart, behind Rihanna with twelve, and the fifth among all artists. The song also reached the top ten on the Hot Dance/Electronic Songs, and the Dance Digital Song Sales charts at five and nine, respectively.

== Reception ==
Upon release, "Hypnotized" received universal critical acclaim from electronic media outlets and music critics alike, with many critics highlighting Ellie Goulding's vocal performance, calling it "ethereal", "mesmerizing", and "captivating".

Jason Heffler of EDM.com wrote that the song "doesn't just describe hypnosis, but administers it, leaving listeners happily trapped in its dreamlike soundscapes", he went further praising the duo artistic partnership, stating that: "the marriage of Anyma's brooding techno production and Goulding's ethereal delivery creates something properly hypnotic, like being slowly pulled into a dancefloor of quicksand." FOTISM of Hit Channel defined the song as a "significant moment in the crossover between pop and dance music" thanks to the "groundbreaking" collaboration between the "emotional depth of Goulding's artistry with the innovative soundscapes crafted by Anyma.", and highlighted the "ethereal vocals" of Goulding and the "immersive electronic production" of Anyma. Jordi Bardají of Jenesaispop described "Hypnotized" sound as a "powerful future disco, techno and house production" that "fits Goulding's ethereal voice like a glove", describing Goulding's performance as "beautiful". The site also highlighted 'Hypnotized" as their "Song of the Day", with Bardají calling it another hit for Goulding, made to tear up the dance-floor.

Writing for Rolling Stone, Tomás Mier included the track in the magazine section "Songs You Need To Know" which highlights the best music released of the week, and dubbed 2025, as "the year of Ellie Goulding‘s comeback." Katie Bain of Billboard also included the song in the magazine "best new dance tracks of the week" playlist, as well praised Anyma for "clocking one of the splashiest new music rollouts in recent memory", complimented Goulding's "captivating" contributions, and dubbed the song as an "urgent dance-pop earworm".

=== Accolades ===
List of awards and nominations
Year	Award	Category	Result	Ref.
2026	Electronic Dance Music Awards	Dance/Electropop Song of the Year	Nominated	
2026	Electronic Dance Music Awards	Best Collaboration	Nominated	
2026	International Dance Music Awards	Best Song (Dance)	Nominated	

=== Year-end lists ===
Critics' rankings
Publication	Year	List	Rank	Ref.
Billboard	2025	The 50 Best Dance Songs of 2025	11	
EDM House Network	2025	The Best EDM Songs of 2025	13	
EDM Lab	2025	Top 10 Chart of 2025	5	
EDM Sauce	2026	Top EDM Collaborations of 2026	8	
EDM Sauce	2026	Top 50 Festival Anthems of 2026	5	
Magnetic Magazine	2025	The 15 Best Melodic Techno Tracks of 2025	Included	

== Personnel ==
Credits were adapted from Apple Music.

- Ellie Goulding – performer, composer, vocals
- Matteo Milleri – performer, composer, producer, keyboards, drum programming
- Jack Rochon – composer
- Scott Harris – composer
- Cassian Stewart-Kasimba – composer, producer, mixing engineer, mastering engineer

== Charts ==
=== Weekly charts ===
Chart (2025)	Peak position
Belarus Airplay (TopHit)	75
Belgium (Ultratop 50 Flanders)	12
CIS Airplay (TopHit)	56
Czech Republic Airplay (ČNS IFPI)	8
Estonia Airplay (TopHit)	4
Japan Hot Overseas (Billboard Japan)	12
Latvia Airplay (LaIPA)	10
Lithuania Airplay (TopHit)	8
Moldova Airplay (TopHit)	151
New Zealand Hot Singles (RMNZ)	12
Poland (Polish Airplay Top 100)	25
Russia Airplay (TopHit)	108
Slovakia Airplay (ČNS IFPI)	15
Ukraine Airplay (TopHit)	54
UK Singles Sales Chart (OCC)	30
US Dance Airplay (Billboard)	1
US Dance Digital Song Sales (Billboard)	9
US Hot Dance/Electronic Songs (Billboard)	5

=== Monthly charts ===
Chart (2025)	Peak position
Belarus Airplay (TopHit)	95
CIS Airplay (TopHit)	71
Czech Republic (Rádio Top 100)	45
Estonia Airplay (TopHit)	8
Lithuania Airplay (TopHit)	23
Slovakia (Rádio Top 100)	28

=== Year-end charts ===
Chart (2025)	Position
Belgium (Ultratop 50 Flanders)	21
Estonia Airplay (TopHit)	58
Lithuania Airplay (TopHit)	58
US Hot Dance/Electronic Songs (Billboard)	40

== Release history ==
Region	Date	Format	Label	Version	Ref.
Various	10 January 2025	Digital download; streaming	Interscope Records; Afterlife	Original	
Various	28 February 2025	Digital download; streaming	Interscope Records; Afterlife	John Summit remix	
Various	20 June 2025	7in Vinyl	Interscope Records; Afterlife	Original + remix	

== See also ==
- List of songs recorded by Ellie Goulding
- List of Billboard number-one dance songs of 2025 § Airplay chart
