= Keinemusik =

German electronic music record label

- Founded: 2009
- Founder: Adam Port, Rampa, andme , Reznik
- Genre: Electronic, house, Afro house
- Country of origin: Germany
- Location: Berlin
- Official website: keinemusik.com

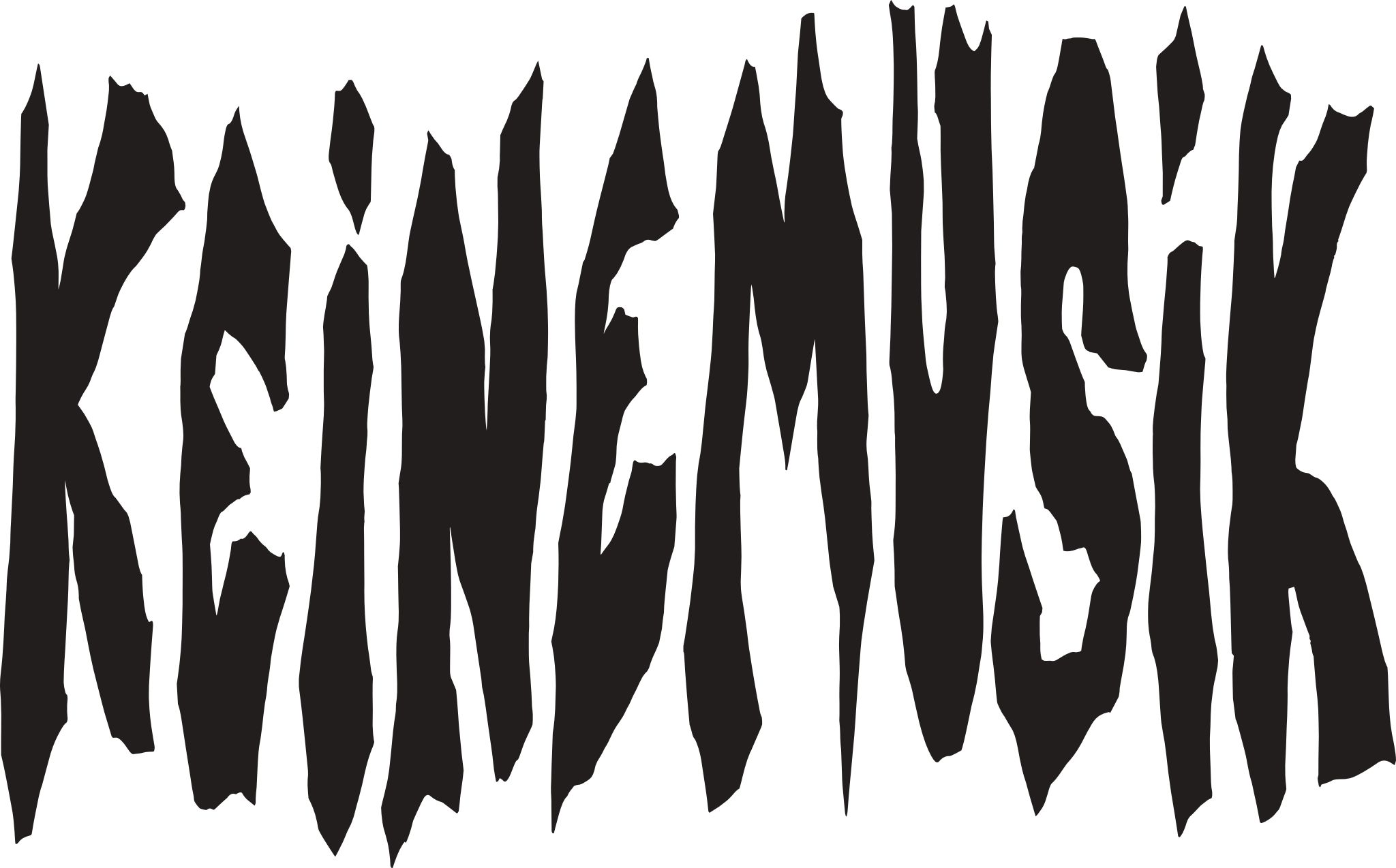
Current Keinemusik logo

Keinemusik is a Berlin based electronic music record label founded in 2009 by DJs and music producers Adam Port, &ME, Rampa, Reznik, alongside visual artist and designer Monja Gentschow. Known for its distinctive artwork and a sound that blends deep house, techno with Afro-inspired rhythms, Keinemusik has earned a global following through its releases and performances leaving an indelible mark on the evolution of Afro house.

== History ==
Keinemusik was founded in Berlin in 2009. So far more than 60 releases have been published. 2017 saw the release of the debut album You Are Safe, produced and written by Adam Port, &Me and Rampa, and featuring guests Chiara Noriko, Nomi Ruiz and Jennifer Touch. In November 2021 a new album "Send Return" was released, with collaborations e.g. with Solomun, RY X and Little Dragon.

Keinemusik is known internationally and throughout Germany in the field of electronic music (house). The members of the record label have had international appearances as DJs, including appearances at Boiler Room Berlin, 2019 at Fusion or 2021 at Tomorrowland. The music label contributed a mix for the BBC Essential Mix series and Groove magazine in 2021 and was part of the Arte United We Stream program on 30 April 2020.

In December 2020, The Cayo Perico Heist update added Keinemusik to the video game Grand Theft Auto Online. The group performs in a virtual club in the fictional city of Los Santos, as well as on the tropical island of Cayo Perico. The game had previously featured artists such as Dixon, Solomun, and Tale of Us.

In 2022, &Me and Rampa were involved in the songs "Falling Back" and "A Keeper" on Honestly, Nevermind, the seventh studio album by Canadian rapper Drake.

In March 2024, the label released "Thandaza" by &Me, Rampa, Adam Port, Alan Dixon and Arabic Piano. In June 2024, the label released Adam Port, Stryv and Orso's song featuring Malachiii, "Move".

In 2026, the label released a new song, "Be The One", produced by Adam Port and SG Lewis.

== Releases ==
Catalogue #	Artist(s)	Title	Year
KM001	David Mayer	Nacktenordner EP	2009
KM002	&Me	F.I.R. EP	2009
KM003	Rampa	Wife & Man EP	2009
KM004	Adam Port	Chemistry EP	2009
KM005	Various Artists	Workparty One	2010
KM006	David Mayer	Crime EP	2010
KM007	&Me	One Day EP	2010
KM008	Rampa & Re.You	Work EP	2011
KM009	Adam Port & Ruede Hagelstein	Corrosive Love EP	2011
KM010	Various Artists	Workparty Two	2011
KM011	David Mayer	Moment EP	2011
KM012	&Me	Purple Rain EP	2011
KM013	Adam Port	Someone To Love EP	2012
KM014	Rampa	So Many EP	2012
KM015	Various Artists	Workparty Three	2012
KM016	David Mayer	Celsius EP	2012
KM017	NR& (Nomi, Rampa, &Me)	Enemy EP	2013
KM018	Adam Port & Here Is Why	Our Fate EP	2013
KM019	&Me	Shallow EP	2013
KM020	Various Artists	Workparty Four	2013
KM021	David Mayer	Sunhole EP	2014
KM022	Rampa	Keep House EP	2014
KM023	&Me	After Dark EP	2014
KM024	Adam Port	Shifter EP	2014
KM025	Various Artists	Workparty Five	2014
KM026	Rampa	Good Times Roll EP	2015
KM027	Adam Port	I Never Wear Black EP	2015
KM028	&Me	Trilogy EP	2015
KM029	Rampa	Newborn Soul EP	2015
KM030	David Mayer	Jaded EP	2016
KM031	NR&	Spoken For EP	2016
KM032	Rampa	Trust EP	2016
KM033	Adam Port	Sonnenfinsternis EP	2016
KM034	&Me feat. Fink	One On One EP	2016
KM035	Rampa	The Touch EP	2017
KM036	Adam Port	Ganesha Song EP	2017
KM037	&Me	Avalon EP	2017
KM038	Various Artists	Doppelgänger 01	2017
KM039	Keinemusik (&Me, Rampa, Adam Port)	You Are Safe LP	2017
KM040	Keinemusik / Various Artists	You Are Safe Remixes Vol.1	2018
KM041	Keinemusik	Muyè (Black Coffee Remix)	2018
KM042	Keinemusik / Various Artists	You Are Safe Remixes Vol.2	2018
KM043	Keinemusik / Various Artists	You Are Safe Remixes Vol.3	2018
KM044	Adam Port	Do You Still Think Of Me? EP	2018
KM045	Rampa	Sunday EP	2018
KM046	&Me	The Rapture Pt.II EP	2018
KM047	Various Artists	Hand In Hand EP	2019
KM048	Adam Port feat. DJ Assault	XXXX EP	2019
KM049	&Me feat. Atelier	1995 EP	2019
KM050	Rampa vs. &Me	Terrace / Garden	2019
KM051	Rampa	Version EP	2020
KM052	Adam Port	White Noise Romantica EP	2020
KM053	Reznik & Good Guy Mikesh	Human Factor EP	2020
KM054	Westbam feat. Richard Butler	You Need The Drugs (&Me Remix)	2020
KM055	Keinemusik feat. Sofie	Discoteca	2021
KM056	Keinemusik feat. Cubicolor	Before The Flood	2021
KM057	Keinemusik feat. Ali Love	Confusion	2021
KM058	Keinemusik feat. Little Dragon	Saving My Love	2021
KM059	Keinemusik	Send Return LP	2021
KM060	Keinemusik / Various Artists	Send Return Remixes Pt.1	2022
KM061	Adam Port & Alan Dixon	Forms Of Love	2022
KM062	Rampa feat. chuala	Les Gout EP	2022
KM063	Reznik & Good Guy Mikesh	One More EP	2022
KM064	Keinemusik / Various Artists	Send Return Remixes Pt.2	2023
KM065	Keinemusik / Various Artists	Send Return Remixes Pt.3	2023
KM066	&Me & Black Coffee	The Rapture Pt.III / L.I.F.E.	2023
KM067	Moderat	More Love (Rampa &Me Remix)	2023
KM068	Keinemusik, Alan Dixon feat. Arabic Piano	Thandaza	2024
KM069	Adam Port, Stryv & Orso feat. Malachii	Move	2024
KM070	Uncle Waffles	Tanzania (Rampa Remix)	2024
KM071	Keinemusik feat. chuala	Say What	2024
KM072	Reznik & Mikesh	One And Only EP	2025
KM073	Keinemusik & Boys Noize feat. Vinson	Crazy For It	2025
KM074	Keinemusik feat. Sevdaliza	See You Again	2025
KM075	Adam Port & SG Lewis	Be The One	2026

== See also ==
- List of record labels
