= The End of Genesys =

Studio album by Anyma
- Released: May 30, 2025
- Genre: Melodic techno
- Label: Afterlife; Interscope
- Producer: Anyma; Cassian; Gino Nano; Argy; Son of Son; Baset; VADAKIN; Stryv; Chris Avantgarde; Sapjer; Y do I; MAGNUS; SCRIPT; Rezz; Massano; Toby Scott; Klahr; Mac Felländer-Tsai; Tom Schaeferdiek

Anyma chronology
Genesys II (2024)	The End of Genesys (2025)

Singles from The End of Genesys
- 1. "Angel in the Dark" Released: December 27, 2024; 2. "Hypnotized" Released: January 10, 2025; 3. "Voices in My Head" Released: February 14, 2025; 4. "Neverland (from Japan)" Released: March 28, 2025; 5. "Work" Released: April 4, 2025; 6. "Entropy" Released: May 29, 2025

The End of Genesys is the third studio album by Italian-American electronic music producer and DJ Anyma. It was released on May 30, 2025, through Anyma's record label Afterlife as the final installment of his Genesys trilogy, following 2023's Genesys and 2024's Genesys II.

A deluxe edition of the album was released on 31 December 2025, featuring additional appearances from acts, including Ejae and Bipolar Sunshine.

== Background and promotion ==
Anyma promoted the album with his residency of the same name, at the Sphere venue, where he played the album tracks live and invited artists from the album to perform live with him, including Grimes, Ellie Goulding, and Sevdaliza.

The music producer announced the album during his last show on the Sphere with the release date of May 23. In May 15, Anyma shared the pre-save link for the album, with a new date of release, May 30. The full-list of featuring artists, alongside the album cover and tracklist were revelead the same day.

=== Singles ===
The album spawned five singles before its release, including: "Angel in the Dark" which was released on December 27, 2024, and served to kick-off the start of Anyma's Sphere residency. The track is a collaboration between DJ Massano and singer-songwriter Nathan Nicholson from the band, The Boxer Rebellion.

The album second single "Hypnotized" featuring electropop singer Ellie Goulding was released on January 10 to both critical and commercial success, becoming Anyma's first charting single on many territories, scoring his first top ten hit on four countries, and peaking at number-one on the US Dance/Mix Show Airplay chart. The song also received huge support from music critics who praised the track vocals, and the duo artistic partnership.

The following track, a collaboration with DJs Argy and Son of Son, titled "Voices in My Head", was released as the album third single on February 14, to generally favorable reviews. "Neverland (from Japan)", a collaboration with Egyptian record producer Baset, was released on March 28 as the album fourth single.

The fifth single, "Work" featuring rapper Yeat, was released alongside its own music video on April 4.

== Reception ==
The End of Genesys was met with generally positive reviews from music critics and electronic music outlets, with critics highlighting its cohesive sound, Anyma's singular artistic vision, and the features' contributions.

Writing for This Song Is Sick, JD Scribner praised the record calling it a perfect closer to trilogy, dubbing it as a "cinematic" and "stunning" album. On his review, Scribner highlighted the tracks: "Taratata", "The End Of Genesys", and "Human Now".

Similarly, Ansh Talim of EDM.com also praised the record for its cinematic production, describing it as an "ambitious collection" of tracks. Talim, also praised Anyma's "bold artistic vision", calling the album his most "impactful" album to date.

Mark Mancino of DJ Life Magazine stated that with The End of Genesys, Anyma solidifies his place as a "distinct and visionary force, capable of delivering genre-defying experiences that transcend the DJ booth". Mancino also said that the album "its a cinematic, emotional, and philosophical statement about what electronic music can be when boundaries are pushed and art takes center stage." Concluding that Anyma "isn’t just closing a trilogy, he’s opening the door to a new era."

== Track listing ==
The End of Genesys - Standard edition
No.	Title	Writer(s)	Producer(s)	Length
1.	"Lucente"	Matteo Milleri	Anyma	1:53
2.	"Voices In My Head" (with Argy and Son of Son)	Milleri; Argy Theofilis; Alec Eklöw	Anyma; Argy; Son of Son	2:26
3.	"Hypnotized" (with Ellie Goulding)	Milleri; Cassian Stewart-Kasimba; Ellie Goulding; Scott Harris; Jack Rochon	Anyma; Cassian	3:00
4.	"Taratata" (with Grimes)	Milleri; Stewart-Kasimba; Adam Sellouk; Claire Boucher	Anyma; Sellouk^{[c]}	3:22
5.	"Neverland (From Japan)" (with Baset)	Milleri; Omar Baset	Anyma; Cassian; Baset	3:10
6.	"Fortuna" (featuring Sevdaliza)	Milleri; Stewart-Kasimba; Andrea Mangiamarchi; Megan Bulow; Nate Campany; Kyle Shearer; Tobias Wincorn; Sara Schell; Daniel Grossman; Sevda Alizadeh; Nina Minguez; Elijah Weinkauf	Anyma; Cassian; VADAKIN; Stryv	2:39
7.	"Atmosphere" (with Chris Avantgarde)	Anyma; Chris Avantgarde	Anyma; Avantgarde	3:43
8.	"Work" (featuring Yeat)	Milleri; Gino Nano; Jasper Levering; Noah Smith	Anyma; Nano; Sapjer	2:54
9.	"The End Of Genesys" (with Y do I)	Milleri; Amos Chalfon; David Semo	Anyma; Y do I	3:21
10.	"Leave A Mark" (with MAGNUS)	Milleri; Stewart-Kasimba; Euan Allison	Anyma; Cassian; MAGNUS	4:15
11.	"In My Mind" (with SCRIPT)	Milleri; Noah Ramsey	Anyma; SCRIPT	3:30
12.	"Entropy" (with Rezz featuring fknsyd)	Milleri; Isabelle Rezazadeh; Alexander Healey; Sydney Fisher	Anyma; Rezz	3:04
13.	"Angel In The Dark" (with Massano and Nathan Nicholson)	Milleri; Sam Rosbotham-Williams; Nathan Nicholson; Toby Scott	Anyma; Massano; Scott	3:19
14.	"Human Now" (featuring Luke Steele)	Milleri; Stewart-Kasimba; Allison; Conor Ross; Luke Steele	Anyma; Cassian	3:10
15.	"Joke’s On You" (featuring 070 Shake)	Milleri; Nano; Johannes Klahr; Danielle Balbuena; Mac Felländer-Tsai; Tom Schaeferdiek	Anyma; Nano; Klahr; Felländer-Tsai; Schaeferdiek	4:20

Deluxe edition
No.	Title	Writer(s)	Producer(s)	Length
16.	"Quantum" (with Chris Avantgarde)	Milleri; Avantgarde	Anyma; Avantgarde	3:31
17.	"Out of My Body" (featuring Ejae)	Milleri; Kim Eun-jae; Jonathan Bach; Dallas Koehlke	Anyma; DallasK; JBach	2:39
18.	"First Time" (with Kevin de Vries)	Milleri; Kevin de Vries	Anyma; de Vries	3:02
19.	"Girls MIA" (with Adam Sellouk featuring Carly Gibert)	Milleri; Sellouk; Lilian "Lita" Caputo; Ryan Hawken; Carla Gibert-Font	Anyma; Sellouk	2:13
20.	"Dreams" (with HILLS)	Milleri; David Schmitt; Thomas Cooperman; Alberto Gelati; Luigi Bordi	Anyma; HILLS	2:32
21.	"Till I Die" (with Solomun featuring Claudia Valentina)	Milleri; Nano; Mladen Solomun; Claudia Cooney	Anyma; Solomun; Nano	3:23
22.	"Giza" (with 19:26)	Milleri; Raffaele Sorrentini	Anyma; 19:26	4:59
23.	"Abyss"	Milleri	Anyma	3:00
24.	"Love Hurt" (featuring Bipolar Sunshine)	Milleri; Reuben "Rebūke" Keeney; Adio Marchant; Cass Lowe; Thomas Barnes; Peter Kelleher; Benjamin Kohn	Anyma; Rebūke	3:14
25.	"Neo-Consciousness" (with Chris Avantgarde)	Milleri; Avantgarde	Anyma; Avantgarde; Argy; Omnya; Y do I	3:48
26.	"Simulation" (with Chris Avantgarde) (SCRIPT Remix)	Milleri; Avantgarde	SCRIPT	2:53
27.	"Neverland (From Japan)" (with Baset) (HNTR Remix)	Milleri; Baset	HNTR	3:01

Notes

- Anyma is credited as a composer with his real name on streaming services, and under his stage name as a producer.

== Personnel ==
Credits adapted from Apple Music.

- Matteo Milleri (Anyma) — performer, producer, composer, programming
- Cassian Stewart-Kasimba (Cassian) — producer, composer, mixing engineer, mastering engineer
- Argy Theofilis (Argy) — producer, composer (track 2)
- Alec Eklöw (Son of Son) — producer, composer (track 2)
- Ellie Goulding — performer, vocals, composer (track 3)
- Jack Rochon — composer (track 3)
- Scott Harris — composer (track 3)
- Omar Baset (Baset) — performer, producer, composer (track 5)
- Gino Nano — producer, composer (track 8)
- Noah Smith (Yeat) — performer, composer (track 8)
- Jasper Levering (Sapjer) — producer, composer (track 8)
- Nathan Nicholson — performer, vocals, composer (track 13)
- Sam Rosbotham-Williams (Massano) — performer, producer, composer (track 13)
- Toby Scott — producer, composer (track 13)

== Charts ==
Chart performance for The End of Genesys
Chart (2025)	Peak position
Belgian Albums (Ultratop Flanders)	149
UK Dance Albums (Official Charts)	4

== Release history ==
The End of Genesys release history
Region	Date	Format(s)	Label	Ref.
Various	May 30, 2025	Digital download; streaming; vinyl LP	Afterlife; Interscope	

== See also ==
- List of 2025 albums
