= Marko Meko =

Egyptian DJ and music producer

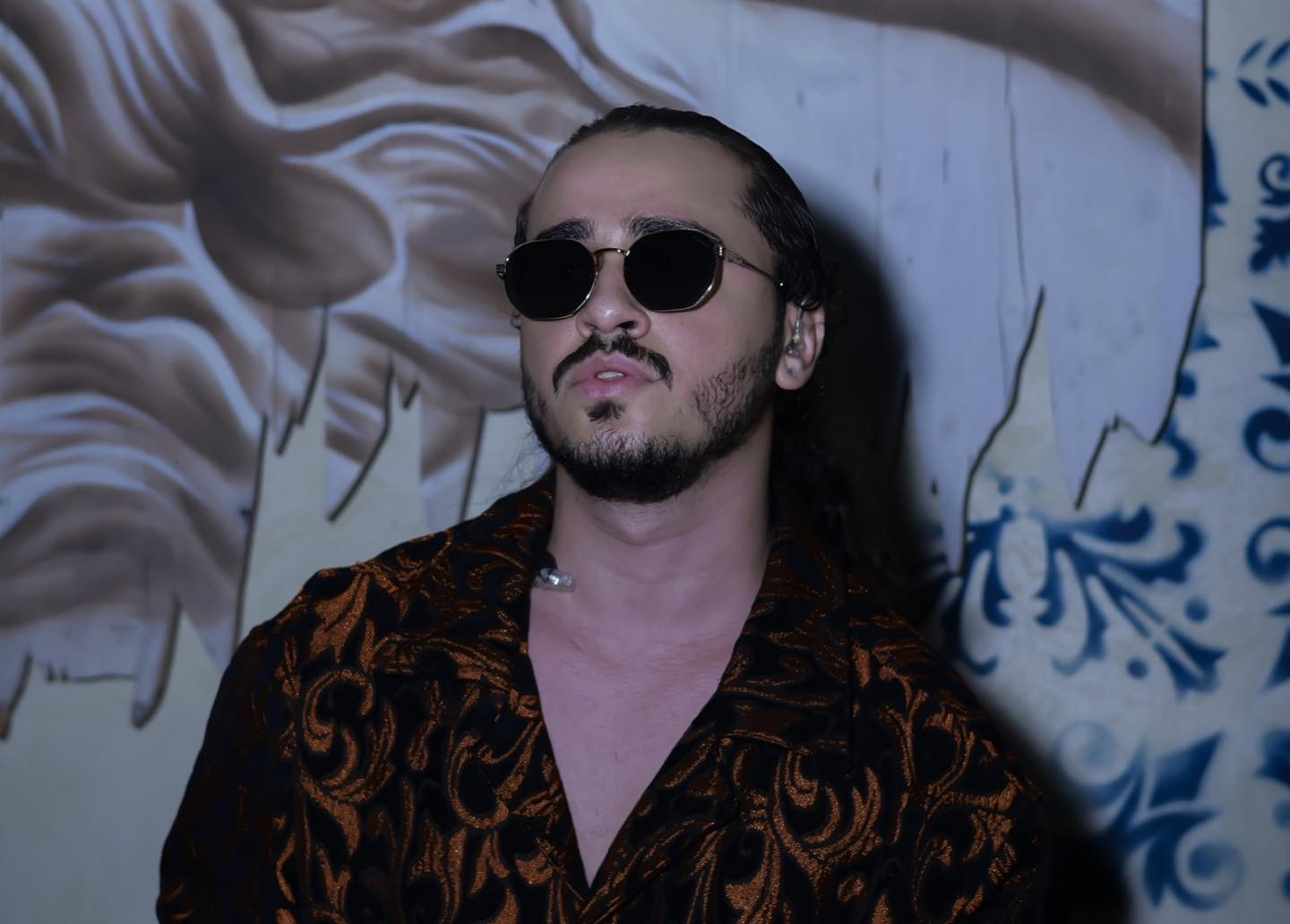

Background information
- Born: Mark Maged Riad; 28 January 2002 (age 24); Moharam Bek, Alexandria, Egypt
- Origin: Hurghada, Egypt
- Genres: Melodic techno, Melodic house
- Occupations: DJ, Record producer
- Years active: 2022–present
- Label: YALLA EDM Records
- Website: https://www.markomeko.com/

Mark Maged Riad (born 28 January 2002), known professionally as Marko Meko, is an Egyptian DJ and record producer. He is associated primarily with melodic house and melodic techno and is the founder of YALLA EDM Records.

== Early life ==
Mark Maged Riad was born on 28 January 2002 in Moharam Bek, Alexandria, Egypt. He attended Saint Vincent de Paul School. His family later moved to Hurghada, where he became interested in DJing after observing DJs working in hotels and entertainment venues.

Meko began experimenting with DJing using VirtualDJ software on a laptop. While working in Marsa Alam, he observed a DJ performing with a controller and laptop, which encouraged him to pursue DJing professionally. He subsequently began working as a resident DJ.

== Career ==
Meko began performing as a DJ in Egypt before developing an interest in music production. His early work included performances in Hurghada, El Gouna and Marsa Alam, after which he expanded his activity to international performances.

His musical style developed around melodic house and melodic techno. He has also incorporated elements of Egyptian musical heritage into electronic music, including a techno remix of Umm Kulthum's song "Enta Omri", which received attention on social media.

In 2023, Meko performed outside Egypt for the first time in Dubai. He subsequently performed in Bahrain and Serbia during 2024. In February 2025, he performed in Dubai and Bahrain as part of an international tour.

In 2025, Meko performed at venues and events in Egypt and Romania. Resident Advisor lists performances including Sounds of Buddha in Hurghada on 25 June 2025, and Kayo Club in Bucharest on 20 September 2025. He also appeared at Cairo Tech Heights in November 2025.

== YALLA EDM Records ==
Meko is the founder of YALLA EDM Records, an electronic music record label based in Egypt. The label focuses on electronic dance music, including melodic house and melodic techno, and has released music by Meko and other artists.

Meko discussed the label's development and its focus on supporting emerging artists in interviews with L'Officiel Arabia and Danceland. YALLA EDM has also been listed by Resident Advisor as a record label, with Meko among its associated artists.

In 2026, Meko continued releasing music and performing internationally. He participated in the International Music Summit in Ibiza, where he was listed as an artist, DJ and producer representing YALLA EDM Records. L'Officiel Arabia reported on his participation in IMS Ibiza and his selection among the Top 50 associated with the Pete Tong DJ Academy.

Meko also released an official remix of ReMan's "Tatakita" through Reveria Records in April 2026.

In May 2026, Resident Advisor listed Meko among the artists performing at Channel 4, an electronic music event held at TBA District 5 by Marakez in Egypt.

Meko was subsequently selected as the Pete Tong DJ Academy's Future Talent DJ of the Month for June 2026. Beatportal announced the selection on 18 June 2026 and identified him as an Egyptian DJ, producer and founder of YALLA EDM Records.

A DJ set by Meko filmed in front of the Great Pyramids of Giza was also reported by L'Officiel Arabia and later by DJ Mag Latinoamérica. The project combined an electronic music performance with footage of the Giza pyramids and was presented as a project connecting Meko's Egyptian background with his electronic music work.

On 28 August 2026, Meko released "Brand New" through YALLA EDM. The track was classified by Beatport as melodic house and techno and was released as an original mix. DJ Mag Latinoamérica subsequently published an article about the release on 2 September 2026, also reporting on Meko's Pyramids DJ set and his forthcoming appearance on Ibiza Live Radio.

== Discography ==
=== Singles and EPs ===
Velarix— Mauro and Marko Meko (YALLA EDM, 2025)

Electric Dreams — Marko Meko (Lelantus Records, 2025)

Skadi — Avity and Marko Meko (YALLA EDM, 2025)

Sin Prisa EP — Marko Meko (Eleven Records (ofc), 2025)

On My Own

"Reverie" featuring Nishaz MK

Tatakita (Marko Meko Remix) — ReMan (Reveria Records, 2026)

Brand New — Marko Meko (YALLA EDM, 2026)

== Television and film ==
Meko has also received screen credits in addition to his music work. IMDb lists him as appearing in the 2025 Egyptian film Project X in the role of a gangster.[18] IMDb also credits him as a music producer on the Egyptian television series Ward w Shokolata in 2025.

== Notable performances and appearances ==
Sounds of Buddha, Hurghada — 25 June 2025

Kayo Club, Bucharest — 20 September 2025

Cairo Tech Heights — 6 November 2025

Le Lac du Tech, Cairo — 26 March 2026

Channel 4, TBA District 5 by Marakez, Egypt — 14 May 2026

International Music Summit, Ibiza — 2026

DJ set filmed at the Great Pyramids of Giza — 2026
