= Adam Port =

Polish DJ and record producer (born 1979)

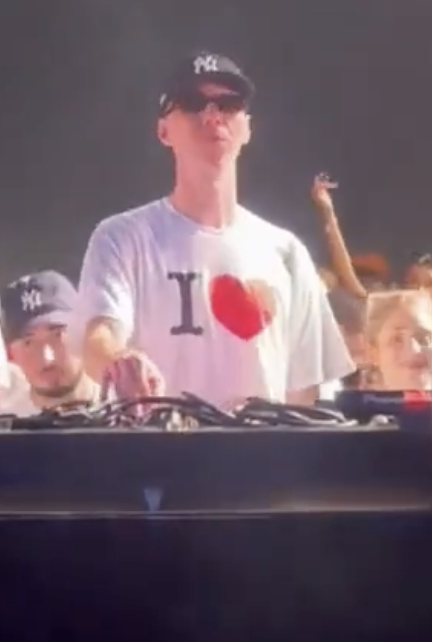
- Polaszek performing in 2025

Background information
- Born: Adam Polaszek; 25 August 1979 (age 47)
- Genres: House; Afrobeats; melodic house
- Occupations: DJ; record producer
- Years active: 2009—present
- Label: Keinemusik

Adam Polaszek (born 25 August 1979), better known as Adam Port, is a German DJ and record producer. He is a founding member of the Keinemusik collective.

== Biography ==
Adam Polaszek was born on 25 August 1979. Musically, he first grew up in the hardcore punk scene before discovering hip-hop, then turntablism and DJing. Through this musical exploration, Polaszek eventually discovered techno and house music. In 2009, he founded the independent label and collective Keinemusik with his friends Rampa, &Me, Reznik, and Monja Gentschow. As a DJ, Polaszek has played at Coachella, Circoloco, Lost Village, Burning Man, Tomorrowland, and Time Warp, among others. As a resident DJ, he worked in various clubs in Berlin.

Polaszek is best known for his 2024 breakout hit single "Move" featuring Stryv, Keinemusik, Orso, and Malachiii. The song became massively successful on TikTok and Spotify. It was later re-released with Camila Cabello, among others.

== Musical style ==
Polaszek blends house music with elements of African music to create Afro house. His tracks also incorporate elements of jazz, soul, and funk, merging into what is known as deep house. His songs are created both solo and collectively.

== Discography ==
=== Studio albums ===
- 2017: You Are Safe (with Rampa & &Me)
- 2022: Send Return (with Keinemusik)

=== Compilation albums ===
- 2012: Faze #04: Adam Port (DJ-Set, Faze Magazin)

=== EPs ===
- 2011; Basement
- 2013: Black Noise Remixes
- 2014: Shifter EP
- 2015: This Time EP (with Jennifer Touch)
- 2017: Changes (with Stereo MCs)
- 2018: Planet 9 EP
- 2022: Send Return Remixes Pt. 1 (with u. a. &Me, Rampa, Keinemusik)
- 2023: Send Return Remixes Pt. 2 (with u. a. &Me, Rampa, Keinemusik)
- 2023: Send Return Remixes Pt. 3 (with u. a. &Me, Rampa, Keinemusik)

=== Singles ===
- 2009: "Boogie Bass"
- 2009: "Chemistry"
- 2011: "Corrosive Love" feat. Ruede Hagelstein
- 2011: "Snatch014"
- 2011: "Weekend"
- 2012: "Sally"
- 2013: "Our Fate" (with Here Is Why)
- 2015: "I Never Wear Black"
- 2016: "Sonnenfinsternis"
- 2017: "I Love You"
- 2017: "Ganesha Song"
- 2017: "Anyway/Vanessa" (with Santé)
- 2017: "Doppelgänger 01" (with &Me & Rampa)
- 2018: "Do You Still Think of Me?"
- 2019: "XXXX" (with DJ Assault)
- 2020: "White Noise Romantica"
- 2021: "Discoteca" (with &Me, Rampa & Sofie Royer)
- 2021: "Before the Flood" (with &Me, Rampa & Cubicolor)
- 2021: "Confusion" (with &Me, Rampa & Ali Love)
- 2021: "Saving My Love" (with &Me, Rampa & Little Dragon)
- 2022: "Forms of Love" (with Alan Dixon & Keinemusik)
- 2023: "Point of No Return" (with Monolink)
- 2023: "The Dream" feat. Martina Camarago (with Theus Mago & Keinemusik)
- 2024: "Thandaza" (with &Me, Rampa, Alan Dixon & Arabic Piano)
- 2024: "Move" (with Stryv, Keinemusik, Orso & Malachiii)
- 2024: "All I Got" (with Masšh, Keinemusik & Ninae)
- 2024: "Move" feat. Camila Cabello (with Stryv, Keinemusik, Orso & Malachiii)
- 2024: "Say What" (with Rampa, &Me, chuala & Keinemusik)
- 2025: "Positions" (with Stryv & Malachiii)
- 2025: "See You Again" (with &Me, Rampa, keinemusik & Sevdaliza)
