= Coachella 2019 =

Edition of music festival

- Dates: Weekend 1: April 12, 2019–April 14, 2019; Weekend 2: April 19, 2019–April 21, 2019
- Locations: Empire Polo Club, Indio, California, United States
- Previous event: Coachella 2018
- Next event: Coachella 2022
- Website: coachella.com

The 2019 Coachella Valley Music & Arts Festival took place across two weekends: April 12 to 14 and 19 to 21 at the Empire Polo Club, Indio, California, United States. The three headlining acts were Childish Gambino on Friday, Tame Impala on Saturday, and Ariana Grande on Sunday. The 2019 edition was the twentieth anniversary of the festival.

== Background ==
The full lineup and date was announced on January 3, 2019, featuring headliners Childish Gambino, Tame Impala, Ariana Grande and second-line performers Janelle Monáe, The 1975, DJ Snake, Diplo, RÜFÜS DU SOL and Blackpink on Friday, Solange, Kid Cudi, Weezer, Aphex Twin, J Balvin, Billie Eilish and Bassnectar on Saturday, and Khalid, Zedd, Gesaffelstein, Bad Bunny, Dillon Francis, CHVRCHES, and YG on Sunday. A week prior to the festival, Solange cancelled her performance due to "major production delays". Rapper Kanye West was due to be announced as a headliner, but was ruled out due to an impractical last minute request for a custom-built dome stage. He instead held his Easter Sunday Service performance at the venue's campgrounds on April 21.

The festival was livestreamed on YouTube during both weekends for the first time.

== Line-up ==
Headline performers are listed in boldface. Artists listed from the latest to earliest set times.

=== Coachella Stage ===
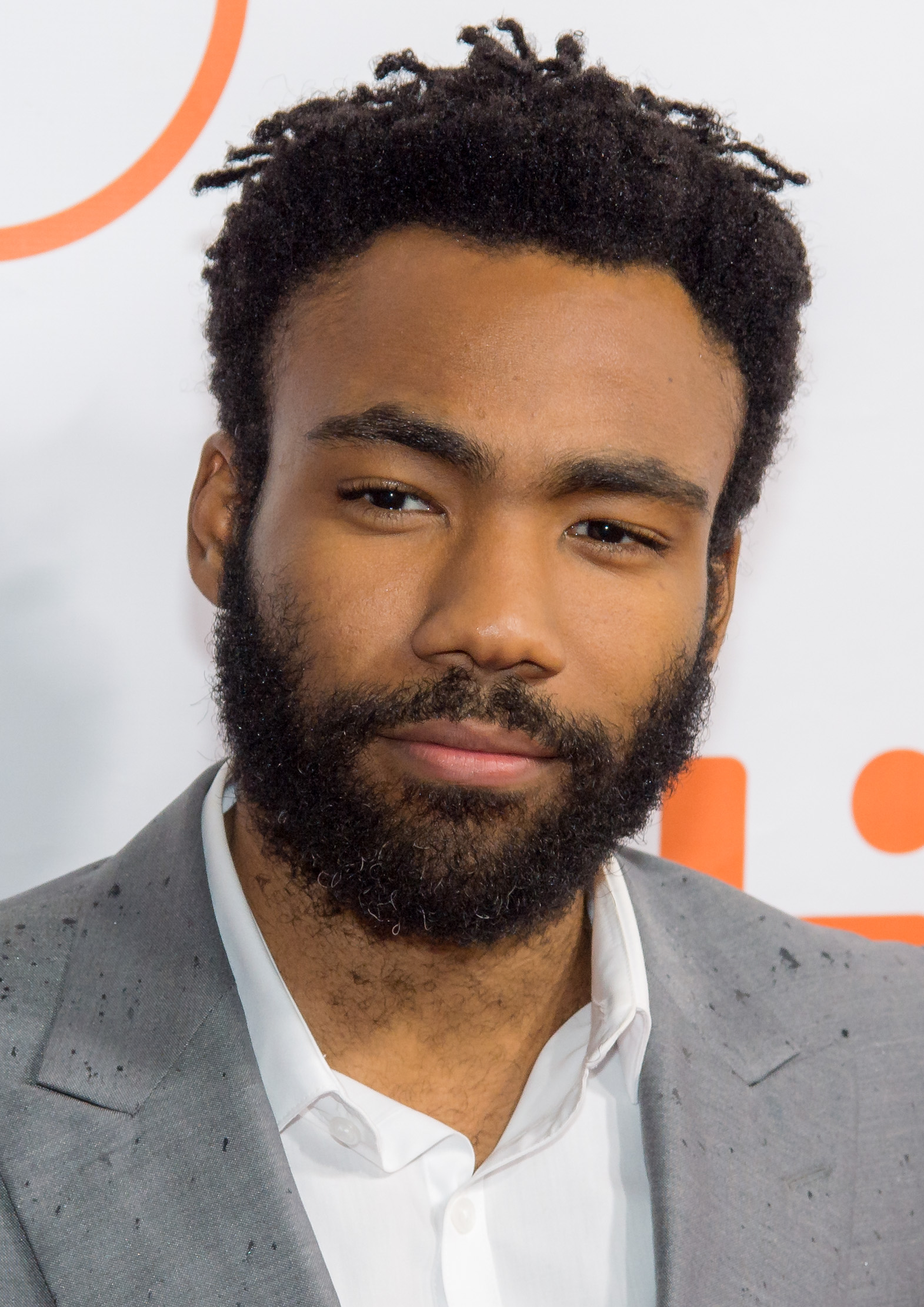
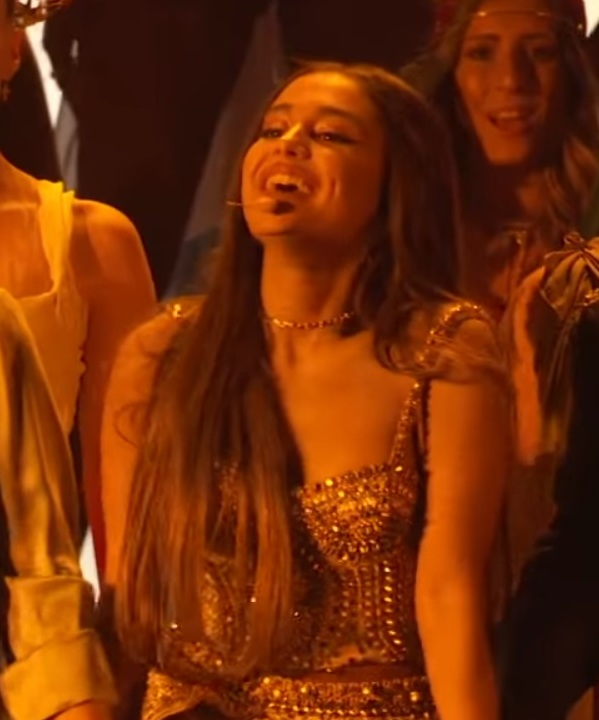
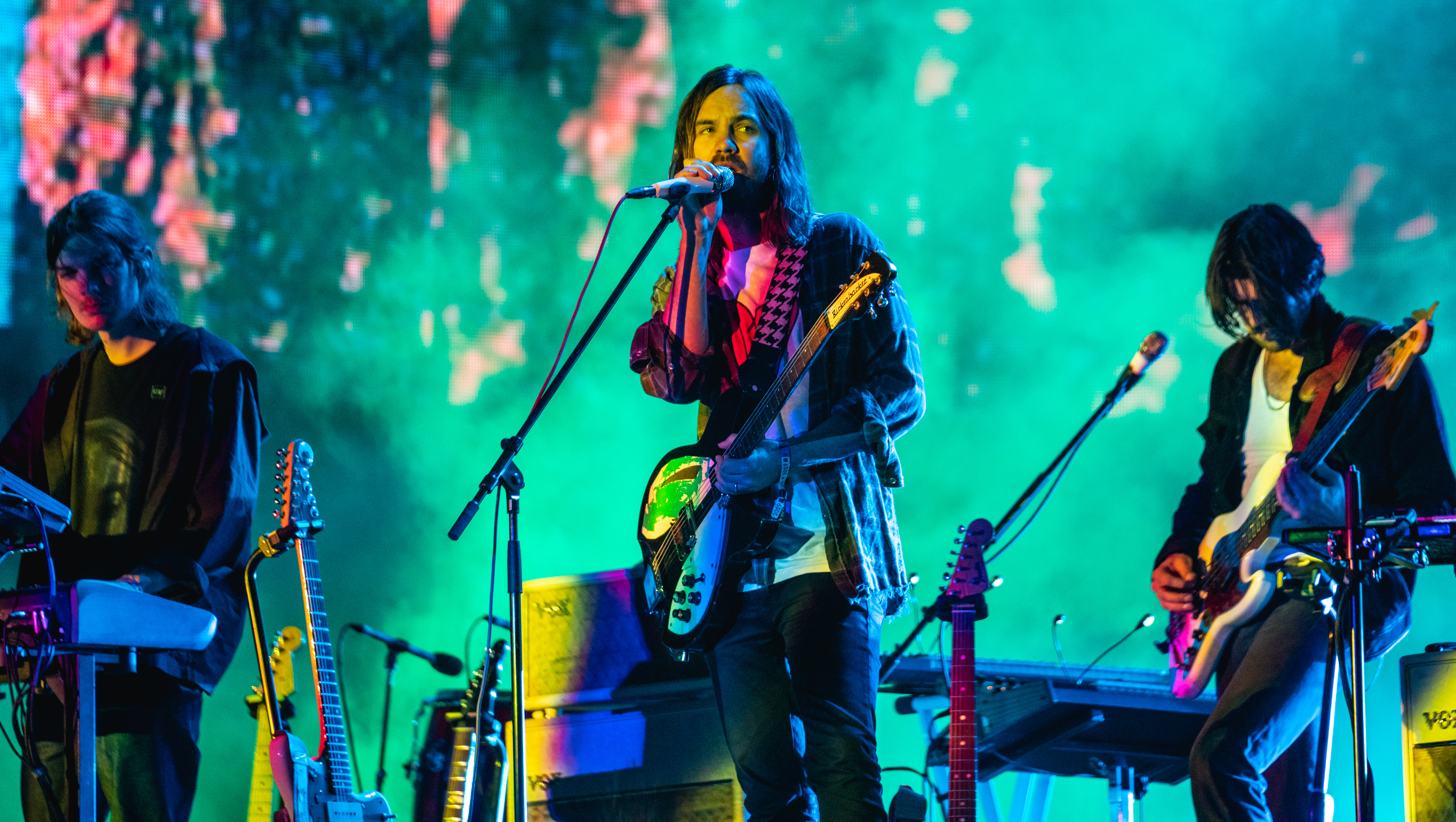
The 2019 festival headliners Childish Gambino, Ariana Grande and Tame Impala.

Friday	Saturday	Sunday
**Childish Gambino**; Janelle Monáe^{[A]}; The 1975^{[B]}; Anderson .Paak & The Free Nationals^{[C]}; Kacey Musgraves; Mon Laferte; Los Tucanes de Tijuana	**Tame Impala**^{[D]}; Weezer^{[E]}; J Balvin^{[F]}; Bazzi^{[G]}; Sabrina Claudio; Mr Eazi; ARIZONA; Gabe Real (Weekend 1); More Fire Mondays (Weekend 2)	**Ariana Grande**^{[H]}; Khalid^{[I]}; Zedd^{[J]}; Bad Bunny^{[K]}; Pusha T; Burna Boy; Alf Alpha (Weekend 1); Ugly Primo (Weekend 2)

- A. Janelle Monáe was joined by Lizzo and Tierra Whack during the first weekend set.
- B. The 1975 was joined by No Rome during both weekends sets.
- C. Anderson .Paak & The Free Nationals were joined by Brandy and Jay Rock during the second weekend set.
- D. Tame Impala was joined by A$AP Rocky during the second weekend set.
- E. Weezer was joined by Chilli of TLC and Tears for Fears during the first weekend set.
- F. J Balvin was joined by Rosalía and Sean Paul during both weekends sets.
- G. Bazzi was joined by Ty Dolla $ign during the first weekend set.
- H. During the first weekend set, Ariana Grande was joined by JC Chasez, Chris Kirkpatrick, Joey Fatone and Lance Bass of NSYNC, P Diddy, Mase and Nicki Minaj. She was joined by Justin Bieber during the second weekend set.
- I. During the first weekend set, Khalid was joined by Billie Eilish, Halsey, Normani and Marshmello. During the second weekend set, he was joined by John Mayer.
- J. During the first weekend set, Zedd was joined by Katy Perry. He was joined by Alessia Cara and Maren Morris during the second weekend set.
- K. Bad Bunny was joined by J Balvin during the first weekend set.

=== Outdoor Theatre ===
Friday	Saturday	Sunday
DJ Snake^{[A]}; RÜFÜS DU SOL; Ella Mai; Gorgon City; JPEGMAFIA; 88Glam^{[B]}; Jimbo Jenkins (Weekend 1); Big Game (Weekend 2)	Bassnectar; Billie Eilish^{[C]}; Christine and the Queens; Bob Moses; Mac DeMarco; The Interrupters^{[D]}; Ty Segall & White Fence; Nostradahm	H.E.R.; Gesaffelstein; Blood Orange^{[E]}; Unknown Mortal Orchestra; Social House; Tiffany Tyson

- A. DJ Snake was joined by Ozuna, Selena Gomez and Cardi B during the first weekend.
- B. 88Glam was joined by Nav during the first weekend.
- C. Billie Eilish was joined by Vince Staples during both weekend sets.
- D. The Interrupters were joined by Tim Armstrong during the first weekend set.
- E. Blood Orange was joined by Tei Shi and Lil Yachty during the first weekend set.

=== Sonora Tent ===
Friday	Saturday	Sunday
U.S. Girls; The Frights; Still Woozy; Kero Kero Bonito; RAT BOY; Turnstile; Las Robertas; Tomasa del Real; COOL ERA	Superorganism; The Garden; Turnover; Hop Along; shame; Javiera Mena; The Messthetics; The Red Pears; Jim Smith	Ocho Ojos; HYUKOH; Soccer Mommy; Men I Trust; Iceage; Cola Boyy; Razorbumps; Easy Life; Mr. 5y10

=== Gobi Tent ===
Friday	Saturday	Sunday
Yves Tumor; Charlotte Gainsbourg; Khruangbin; Polo & Pan; dvsn; Calypso Rose; Beach Fossils; Hurray for the Riff Raff; Let's Eat Grandma	Little Simz; Parcels; Smino; Maggie Rogers; SiR^{[A]}; JAIN; SALES; Steady Holiday; Jambinai; CPTN KIRK (Weekend 1); Fundido (Weekend 2)	Jon Hopkins; Perfume; 070 Shake; Dermot Kennedy; Alice Merton; boy pablo; Emily King; Record Safari

- A. SiR was joined by Schoolboy Q during the first weekend set.

=== Mojave Tent ===
Friday	Saturday	Sunday
Nina Kraviz; SOPHIE; Rosalía; Tierra Whack; SG Lewis; King Princess; Yellow Days; Vickki Acuna	Aphex Twin; Four Tet; Virgil Abloh; Soulection; FKJ^{[A]}; serpentwithfeet; Wallows; CHON; Yeti Out (Weekend 1); Lealani (Weekend 2)	Kaytranada^{[B]}; CHVRCHES^{[C]}; Sofi Tukker^{[D]}; Clairo^{[E]}; Lizzo; Dennis Lloyd; Rico Nasty; Mansionair; Ericalandia (Weekend 1); Subsuelo (Weekend 2)

- A. FKJ was joined by Masego during the first weekend set.
- B. Kaytranada was joined by Anderson .Paak during the first weekend set.
- C. Chvrches was joined by Marshmello during the first weekend set.
- D. Sofi Tukker was joined by Pabllo Vittar during the first weekend set.
- E. Clairo was joined by Cuco during the first weekend set.

=== Sahara Tent ===
Friday	Saturday	Sunday
Kayzo; Nora En Pure; Diplo; Blackpink; Jaden Smith^{[A]}; FISHER; Jauz; Anna Lunoe; Murda Child; Loboman	Kid Cudi^{[B]}; Wiz Khalifa^{[C]}; Juice WRLD^{[D]}; Gryffin; CloZee; Sheck Wes; Murda Beatz; Ookay; BearTraxx B2B Special Guest (Weekend 1); John Beaver + DJ Durty (Weekend 1); Alf Alpha (Weekend 2); Jimbo Jenkins (Weekend 2)	NGHTMRE^{[E]}; Dillon Francis; Gucci Gang^{[F]}; YG^{[G]}; Playboi Carti; SOB X RBE; Shallou; R3LL (Weekend 1); Cre-8 (Weekend 2)

- A. Jaden Smith was joined by WILLOW, Jordyn Woods and Will Smith during the first weekend.
- B. During the first weekend set, Kid Cudi was joined by Chip tha Ripper. He was joined by Kanye West, 070 Shake, Ty Dolla $ign and Chip tha Ripper during the second weekend set.
- C. Wiz Khalifa was joined by Ty Dolla $ign and Chevy Woods during the first weekend set.
- D. Juice WRLD was joined by Roddy Ricch during the first weekend set.
- E. NGHTMRE was joined by Slander, Lil Jon and A$AP Ferg during the first weekend set.
- F. Gucci Gang consisted of rappers Gucci Mane, Lil Pump and Smokepurpp.
- G. YG was joined by Tyga, DJ Mustard, 2 Chainz and Big Sean during the first weekend set. During the second weekend set, he was joined by 2 Chainz and A$AP Rocky.

=== Yuma Tent ===
Friday	Saturday	Sunday
Hot Since 82 B2B Lauren Lane B2B Nic Fanciulli; Nicole Moudaber; Chris Lake; Kölsch; Amelie Lens; CamelPhat; Walker & Royce; Ross from Friends; Blond:ish; Dave P	Stephan Bodzin; Idris Elba; Tale of Us; Deep Dish; Âme; Adriatique; Lee Burridge; Agoria; Heidi Lawden	Cirez D; Guy Gerber; Maya Jane Coles Presents: Nocturnal Sunshine; Charlotte de Witte; Dusky; Yotto; Patrice Bäumel; Jan Blomqvist; Tara Brooks

== Incidents ==
On April 6, 2019, Christopher Griffin, 49, the festival lead rigger of twenty years, died on the festival campgrounds after sustaining fatal injuries. Griffin fell from the stage scaffolding while working on the festival setup.

On April 22, 2019, The Daily Beast published a report of the alleged "inhumane treatment" of the festival security guards, citing poor tent conditions, insufficient food and water, long hours in the harsh sun, minimum wages and poor coordination between the organizers and the subcontracting security firms.
