= Orso =

Orso is the Italian word meaning "bear", and is a common given name and surname in Italy.

Given name

- Orso of Benevento (died 892), Prince of Benevento
- Orso Ipato, Doge of Venice, 726–737
- Orso I Participazio (died 881), Doge of Venice
- Orso II Participazio (died 932), Doge of Venice, 912–932
- Orso Maria Guerrini (born 1943), Italian actor
- Orso Mario Corbino (1876–1937), Italian physicist and politician

Surname

- Anna Orso (1938–2012), Italian actress
- Michel Orso (born 1936), French singer-songwriter
- Mike D'Orso (born 1953), American journalist

== Other ==
- Örsö, an island in the Stockholm archipelago, Sweden
- Orso (band), a US-based band
- Sant'Orso, name in Italian of the Collegiate church of Saint Ursus in Aosta, Italy

== See also ==
- Edda Dell'Orso (born 1935), Italian singer
- L'orso bruno, a 1975 album by Antonello Venditti
