= Genesys (album) =

Studio album by Anyma
- Released: August 11, 2023
- Genre: Melodic techno
- Length: 55:47
- Label: Interscope, Afterlife
- Producer: Anyma; Chris Avantgarde; Cassian; CamelPhat; Grimes; Stylo; Eryka; Rebūke; Innellea

Anyma chronology
Genesys (2023)	Genesys II (2024)

Singles from Genesys
- 1. "Welcome To The Opera" Released: 24 May 2022; 2. "Consciousness" Released: 17 August 2022; 3. "The Sign" Released: 28 October 2022; 4. "Eternity" Released: 10 February 2023; 5. "Explore Your Future" Released: 23 March 2023; 6. "Syren" Released: 28 July 2023

Genesys is the debut solo album by Italian-American DJ and record producer Anyma, member of the music duo Tale of Us.

It was executive produced by Anyma and includes collaborations with Chris Avantgarde, Cassian, CamelPhat, Delhia de France, Grimes, Rebuke, Innellea, Poppy Baskcomb, and Sevdaliza. It was released on August 11, 2023, by Interscope Records and Afterlife, to generally positive reviews.

== Background and release ==
The album includes 14 tracks, 9 of which are collaborations with other artists, such as Grimes, CamelPhat, Innellea, Rebūke, and Sevdaliza. According to The album title refers to the genesis of a new musical and artistic vision, as well as to the theme of human-machine interaction that runs throughout the album.

The album is accompanied by a series of audiovisual shows and NFT artworks that depict the story of Eva, a humanoid character who represents the embodiment of Anyma's music and philosophy. Eva is a digital being who seeks to transcend her artificial nature and connect with her human emotions and spirituality.

To promote the record, several singles were released: The album's lead single, "Welcome to the Opera" was released on May 24, 2022, and marked the first collaboration between Anyma and Grimes. The track is a fusion of opera, techno, and pop, and features vocals by Grimes.

A remix made by Eric Prydz of Consciousness, was promoted as the album second single.

"The Sign" with CamelPhat was released as the third single from the record, and it saw commercial success, reaching the top ten on the UK Dance Chart and the Billboard Dance/Electronic Songs chart. "Eternity" and "Explore Your Future" were released as the fourth and fifth singles of the record. "Syren" with Rebuke was released as the sixth and final single from the album on July 28, 2023.

== Reception ==
Genesys received positive reviews from music critics, who highlighted the album's diversity, creativity, and emotional perspective.

The album was described as "an exercise in dystopian storytelling" by EDM.com, and as "a unique sonic experience that invites the listener to journey into the inner realms of the self" by EDM Identity. The album also received recognition for its use of technology and visuals, especially the NFT artworks that were sold on the blockchain platform SuperRare. The NFTs featured Eva in various scenarios and environments, such as a futuristic opera, a desert landscape, and a cosmic space.

Michael Premier of Premier EDM praised the record, describing it as a "cohesive" and "thought-provoking concept album that feels increasingly rare in the current music climate". Premier called the tracks “Consciousness”, “Eternity”, and “The Sign” as some of the "most iconic songs of the year", and highlighted “Chordial”, “The Pact”, “Unearth”, “Explore Your Future” and “The Answer” as his personal favorites. The Groove Cartel

Writing for We Rave You, Milan Zeisler praised Anyma's artistic vision, stating that the record "brilliantly illuminates Anyma’s path, elevating his career with its ingenious craftsmanship." Maria Clinton of EDM Identity said that the record provides clarity on who Anyma is as a solo artist, praising him for having "what it takes to dominate all on his own". She also called “Consciousness,” “Eternity,” “The Sign,” and,“Syren” as tracks that "will forever be locked in history as timeless works of art".

== Track listing ==
Genesys track listing
No.	Title	Music	Producer(s)	Length
1.	"Eternity" (with Chris Avantgarde)	Matteo Milleri; Christian Vornweg	Anyma; Chris Avantgarde	3:06
2.	"Welcome to the Opera" (with Grimes)	Christian Vornweg; Claire Boucher; Matteo Milleri	Anyma; Avantgarde; Cassian; Grimes	4:05
3.	"Chordial"	Christian Vornweg; Matteo Milleri	Anyma; Avantgarde	3:42
4.	"Samsara" (with Sevdaliza)	Cassian Stewart Kasimba; Christian Vornweg; Matteo Milleri; Nir Sadoun; Sevda Alizadeh	Anyma; Cassian; Avantgarde; Stylo	4:23
5.	"Explore Your Future"	Matteo Milleri	Anyma; Cassian	3:40
6.	"Syren" (with Rebūke)	Matteo Milleri; Reuben Keeney	Anyma; Rebūke	3:17
7.	"Save Me" (with Cassian and Poppy Baskcomb)	Poppy Baskcomb; Toby Scott; Bailey Small; Cassian Stewart Kasimba; Christopher Hall; David Hall; Joshua Field; Matteo Milleri; Paul Harris; Sacha Marie Taylor	Anyma; Cassian	3:09
8.	"Unearth"	Christian Vornweg; Matteo Milleri	Anyma; Avantgarde	4:15
9.	"Walking With A Ghost" (with Delhia de France)	Christian Vornweg; Delhia De France; Matteo Milleri	Anyma; Avantgarde	4:29
10.	"The Answer"	Cassian; Christian Vornweg; Matteo Milleri	Anyma; Avantgarde	4:05
11.	"The Sign" (with CamelPhat)	Christopher Hall; David Hall; David Whelan; Joshua Field; Katie Foulkes; Matteo Milleri; Mike Di Scala	Anyma; CamelPhat; Eynka	3:33
12.	"Angel 1" (with Innellea)	Matteo Milleri; Michael Miethig	Anyma; Innellea	5:46
13.	"Consciousness" (with Chris Avantgarde)	Christian Vornweg; Matteo Milleri	Anyma; Avantgarde	4:34
14.	"The Pact"	Cassian Stewart Kasimba; Matteo Milleri	Anyma; Cassian	3:36
Total length:				55:47

== Charts ==
Chart (2023–24)	Peak position
UK Album Downloads (OCC)	63
UK Dance Albums (OCC)	5

== Release history ==
Release dates and formats for "Genesys"
Region	Date	Format	Label	Ref.
Various	11 August 2023	Digital download; streaming	Afterlife; Interscope Records	
