= &Me (DJ) =

German DJ and record producer

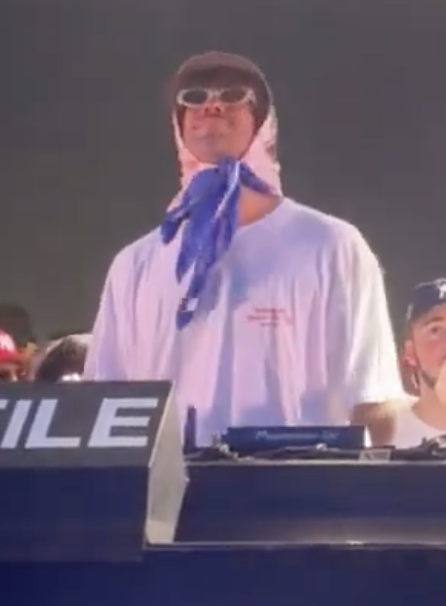
- Boadu in 2025

Background information
- Born: André Boadu
- Genres: House; techno
- Occupations: DJ; record producer
- Years active: 2009—present
- Label: Keinemusik

André Boadu, better known as &Me, is a German electronic dance music producer and DJ from Berlin. His music falls under the genres of techno and house. He is a co-founder of the record label Keinemusik.

== Biography ==
André Boadu has Ghanaian roots and has been active as a music producer and DJ since the 2000s, including with Terranova starting in 2007. Since 2009, he has been a part of the Berlin-based record label Keinemusik along with Rampa, Reznik, and Adam Port.

Boadu has performed at festivals such as Burning Man, Zamna Tulum, Coachella, the Stuttgart Electronic Music Festival, Electro Magnetic, Parookaville, Electric Zoo, the Sonus Festival, Mayday, and Time Warp. Together with his labelmates Rampa and Adam Port, Boadu was featured in the "Cayo Perico Heist" update for the games Grand Theft Auto V and Grand Theft Auto Online, both by the American video game developer Rockstar Games.

In 2022, Boadu, along with Rampa, collaborated with Canadian rapper Drake on the songs "Falling Back" and "A Keeper" from his seventh studio album Honestly, Nevermind.

== Discography ==
=== Albums ===
- 2017: You Are Safe (with Adam Port, Rampa)
- 2022: Send Return (with Adam Port, Rampa)

=== Singles & EPs ===
- 2007: Diskotecktonik/Black Palms (with Fetisch)
- 2008: The Calling/Useless Man (with Fetisch)
- 2009: "F.I.R."
- 2009: "Bleed"
- 2009: "On"
- 2010: "One Day"
- 2011: "Purple Rain"
- 2011: Red Flag/Clamb
- 2012: Matters & Ashes EP
- 2013: Blitz EP
- 2014: "After Dark"
- 2015: Trilogy EP
- 2016: "Shadows"
- 2017: Avalon EP
- 2018: "In Your Eyes"
- 2018: "The Rapture Pt.II"
- 2019: "1995"
- 2021: Terrace / Garden (with Rampa)
- 2023: "The Rapture Part. III" (with Black Coffee)
