= Move (Adam Port and Stryv song) =

Single by Adam Port and Stryv featuring Malachiii
- Released: 7 June 2024
- Genre: Afrobeats; melodic house
- Length: 2:57
- Label: Keinemusik
- Songwriters: Adam Polaszek; Hamid Bashir; Malachi Cohen
- Producers: Adam Port; Stryv

Adam Port singles chronology
"Thandaza" (2024)	"Move" (2024)	"All I Got" (2024)

Stryv singles chronology
"Move" (2024)

Malachiii singles chronology
"Before We Die" (2024)	"Move" (2024)	"She Said She's My Bitch" (2024)

Audio video
- "Move" (extended version) on YouTube

Visualizer
- "Move" (feat. Camila Cabello) on YouTube

"Move" is a song by German DJ Adam Port and Pakistani-American producer Stryv featuring singer Malachiii. It was released on 7 June 2024, through Keinemusik. The song went viral on social media after being played at several Keinemusik events. A remix version of the song was released with the addition of the American singer Camila Cabello. The song topped the charts in Switzerland, Portugal, Luxembourg, Malta, Moldova, Hungry, Greece, and Belgium.

== Background and release ==
"Move" was released on 7 June 2024 through the German record label Keinemusik, being viral on social media due to Keinemusik's events. The remixed version of the song, featuring American singer Camila Cabello, was released on 11 October 2024.

== Reception and composition ==
"Move" was met with widespread acclaim, with Rebecca Besnos of When We Dip describing it as "irresistible, lilting Afrobeats meets melodic house feel", and Milan Zeisler of We Rave You as "follow[ing] the Afro House trail".

== Commercial performance ==
The song reached number one in the Flanders region of Belgium, Portugal and Switzerland, and the top 10 in Austria, Germany and the Netherlands. The song reached the top 10 in the UK, following the release of the Camila Cabello remix.

== Charts ==
=== Weekly charts ===
Weekly chart performance for "Move"
Chart (2024–2025)	Peak position
Australia (ARIA)	98
Austria (Ö3 Austria Top 40)	5
Belarus Airplay (TopHit)	50
Belgium (Ultratop 50 Flanders)	1
Belgium (Ultratop 50 Wallonia)	4
Bulgaria Airplay (PROPHON)	1
Canada (Canadian Hot 100)	55
Canada CHR/Top 40 (Billboard)	38
Colombia Anglo Airplay (National-Report)	4
CIS Airplay (TopHit)	21
Croatia (Billboard)	18
Czech Republic Singles Digital (ČNS IFPI)	62
Estonia Airplay (TopHit)	23
France (SNEP)	19
Germany (GfK)	3
Global 200 (Billboard)	24
Greece International (IFPI)	1
Hungary (Dance Top 40)	1
Hungary (Single Top 40)	29
Ireland (IRMA)	15
Italy (FIMI)	18
Israel (Mako Hitlist)	14
Latvia Airplay (LaIPA)	2
Latvia Streaming (LaIPA)	14
Lebanon (Lebanese Top 20)	2
Lithuania (AGATA)	9
Luxembourg (Billboard)	1
Malta Airplay (Radiomonitor)	2
Moldova Airplay (TopHit)	1
Netherlands (Dutch Top 40)	4
Netherlands (Single Top 100)	2
New Zealand Hot Singles (RMNZ)	26
North Macedonia Airplay (Radiomonitor)	3
Norway (VG-lista)	21
Poland (Polish Airplay Top 100)	30
Poland (Polish Streaming Top 100)	80
Portugal (AFP)	1
Romania (Billboard)	9
Romania Airplay (UPFR)	3
Romania Airplay (Media Forest)	1
Russia Airplay (TopHit)	63
Serbia Airplay (Radiomonitor)	6
Slovakia Airplay (ČNS IFPI)	47
Slovakia Singles Digital (ČNS IFPI)	20
Spain (Promusicae)	65
Suriname (Nationale Top 40)	5
Sweden (Sverigetopplistan)	36
Switzerland (Schweizer Hitparade)	1
Turkey International Airplay (Radiomonitor Türkiye)	3
Ukraine Airplay (TopHit)	95
UAE (IFPI)	5
UK Singles (Official Charts)	10
UK Indie (Official Charts)	2
US Hot Dance/Electronic Songs (Billboard)	4
US World Digital Song Sales (Billboard)	3

Weekly chart performance for "Move" featuring Camila Cabello
Chart (2024)	Peak position
Estonia Airplay (TopHit)	23
Greece International (IFPI)	7
Romania Airplay (TopHit)	68
Romania TV Airplay (Media Forest)	8
San Marino Airplay (SMRTV Top 50)	10

=== Monthly charts ===
Monthly chart performance for "Move"
Chart (2024)	Peak position
Belarus Airplay (TopHit)	64
CIS Airplay (TopHit)	29
Czech Republic (Singles Digitál Top 100)	65
Estonia Airplay (TopHit)	39
Lithuania Airplay (TopHit)	23
Moldova Airplay (TopHit)	3
Romania Airplay (TopHit)	2
Russia Airplay (TopHit)	93
Slovakia (Rádio Top 100)	47
Slovakia (Singles Digitál Top 100)	23

Monthly chart performance for "Move featuring Camila Cabello"
Chart (2024)	Peak position
Estonia Airplay (TopHit)	77
Romania Airplay (TopHit)	77

=== Year-end charts ===
2024 year-end chart performance for "Move"
Chart (2024)	Position
Austria (Ö3 Austria Top 40)	39
Belgium (Ultratop 50 Flanders)	21
Belgium (Ultratop 50 Wallonia)	37
CIS Airplay (TopHit)	110
Estonia Airplay (TopHit)	148
France (SNEP)	101
Germany (GfK)	38
Global 200 (Billboard)	177
Hungary (Dance Top 40)	70
Israel (Mako Hitlist)	39
Italy (FIMI)	83
Netherlands (Dutch Top 40)	24
Netherlands (Single Top 100)	19
Romania Airplay (TopHit)	20
Switzerland (Schweizer Hitparade)	14
UK Singles (OCC)	82
US Hot Dance/Electronic Songs (Billboard)	25

2025 year-end chart performance for "Move"
Chart (2025)	Position
Austria (Ö3 Austria Top 40)	27
Belgium (Ultratop 50 Flanders)	38
Belgium (Ultratop 50 Wallonia)	34
CIS Airplay (TopHit)	176
Germany (GfK)	24
Global 200 (Billboard)	75
Hungary (Dance Top 40)	6
Italy (FIMI)	85
Moldova Airplay (TopHit)	1
Netherlands (Single Top 100)	27
Romania Airplay (TopHit)	7
Switzerland (Schweizer Hitparade)	9
US Hot Dance/Electronic Songs (Billboard)	10

== Certifications ==
Certifications for "Move"
Region	Certification	Certified units/sales
Belgium (BRMA)	Platinum	40,000^{‡}
Brazil (Pro-Música Brasil)	Platinum	40,000^{‡}
France (SNEP)	Diamond	333,333^{‡}
Italy (FIMI)	Platinum	100,000^{‡}
New Zealand (RMNZ)	Platinum	30,000^{‡}
Spain (Promusicae)	Platinum	60,000^{‡}
United Kingdom (BPI)	Platinum	600,000^{‡}
Streaming
Greece (IFPI Greece)	Diamond	10,000,000^{†}
Greece (IFPI Greece) Camila Cabello version	Gold	1,000,000^{†}
^{‡} Sales+streaming figures based on certification alone.^{†} Streaming-only figures based on certification alone.
