= Luke Marzec =

British musician

Luke Marzec is an English singer-songwriter, producer, and multi-instrumentalist. He released his debut EP, Chances, in 2018, and subsequently released two further EPs. His debut album is titled Something Good Out of Nothing, released in August 2025.

== Early life and education ==
Luke Marzec was born in England. His father is a set designer, who later worked in industrial theatre, designing large events in the late 1990s. His mother was from Gdańsk in Poland, and encouraged his musical development. He started playing violin at seven years old, saxophone at ten, and piano soon afterwards. During his childhood he spent a lot of time practising or performing music. In Year 5, he wrote his first song - a Christmas carol, for a school concert, written for an organ, with two vocal lines. He won a place at the Junior Department of the Royal College of Music in London aged 11, where he studied classical and jazz saxophone under Mornington Lockett. He was at the same time a member of the National Youth Wind Ensemble of Great Britain. By the time he left secondary school, he had led a number of classical and jazz bands, ensembles, and orchestras.

He studied philosophy at University of York in York, and while there, formed his first band, The Marzec Group. While living in the north, he played sax in several bands, playing different styles of music, including jazz, psychedelic, indie, and brass bands.

Marzec earned a scholarship to study a master's degree at the Trinity Laban Conservatoire of Music and Dance in London, but did not complete it, choosing instead to concentrate on a solo music career.

== Career ==
Marzec released his debut EP, Chances, in 2018, and released two further EPs.

He began to gain wider attention by 2019, mainly through YouTube, where he appeared in videos directed by Harry Lindley. At that time he was sharing a studio in London with two other musicians, and working on songs to make into an album.

He has collaborated with Irish musician Maverick Sabre, VC Pines, German DJ/producer collective Jazzanova, and English singer-songwriter Benjamin Francis Leftwich. He was featured on German musician Johannes Brecht's track "Voicing Something", from his 2022 Live and Love EP, which was later remixed by Swiss duo Adriatique.

His first single was "I Can't Get You Out of My Mind", which explores the emotional complexities brought about by a relationship break-up, and was inspired by tracks from Amy Winehouse's Back To Black and Arctic Monkeys' AM. This was followed by "Growing Up With You" in February 2025. The track features live drums by David Beauchamp, along with bass by Marzec, and was recorded in his home studio in Buckfastleigh, Devon. This was followed in July by "Broken Promises". The music video for this single was directed by Alice Carfrae, and filmed at various towns along the coast of England.

Marzec's debut album is titled Something Good Out of Nothing, released in August 2025 by Swift Half Records, both on vinyl and digitally. The album was launched on 8 August at a music venue in Totnes called The Barrel House, where he afterwards gained a residency. It comprises two distinct halves: Side A focuses on memory and nostalgia, while the themes of the songs on Side B are those of "resistance and possibility". During the residency, Marzec continued his live project, Luke Marzec and the Neighbours (with David Beauchamp on drums; Sam Keene on bass; and Will Tyler on electric guitar)..

Marzec is billed as a "soul-experimentalist". He has been involved in a number of projects simultaneously. One of these is the curation of a music collective or ongoing "jam session" in London called Headroom, which includes electronic and jazz musicians. As of 2025 he is also part of an experimental group called Lazy H and the Loose Cables, who released their debut album Rotary Perception in 2024.

== Reception ==
Marzec's music has won praise from music blog Earmilk, BBC Introducing ("our very own answer to Teddy Swims"), and Radio 2's DJ Spoony. His music has also been played by BBC Radio 6 Music and KCRW in Los Angeles. He won critical acclaim for his 2018 debut EP Chances, and the track "I Can't Get You Out Of My Mind" was selected for Spotify's Retro Soul playlist.

As of July 2025 his music had had over 15 million streams on Spotify.

"Record of the Day" website called "Broken Promises" "a natural fit for Radio 2 spins and mellow/soulful DSP playlists. Quietly brilliant".

His album Something Good Out of Nothing was described in the Dartmouth Chronicle as "showcasing Marzec's signature blend of soul-rooted songwriting, richly layered instrumentation, and experimental production".

== Live performances ==
Marzec performed at The Social in London in September 2019.

He played at Henley Festival in July 2025. In August 2025 he launched his album at The Barrel House, and did a set at the Boardmasters Festival in Cornwall, playing for an hour and a half. On 1 May 2026, he performed at the Moor Imagination Centre in Buckfastleigh, with his band Big Soul Band, showcasing his new music to a home crowd. He also performed at the We Out Here festival, and at the Sidmouth Jazz & Blues Festival in May 2026.

In early 2026 Marzec performed as lead singer and saxophonist with former Dire Straits drummer Pick Withers' band, Pick's Pocket, at PizzaExpress Live Chelsea, at The Pheasantry in King's Road. His live project, Luke Marzec and The Neighbours, is scheduled to appear at the same venue on 7 November 2026.

== Personal life ==
For some years before 2019, and then through the COVID-19 pandemic, Marzec lived on a narrowboat on London canals, after a friend left it to him when he left the country. He later relocated to Devon.
