= Örsö =

Island in Österåker Municipality, Sweden

Coordinates: 59°26′N 18°36′E

Örsö is an island located in the Stockholm archipelago in Sweden.

The island is located south of Ljusterö and north of Värmdö. It neighbours popular island Grinda.
