= Adriatique =

Swiss electronic music producer and DJ duo

- Adriatique in 2026 at the Montreux Jazz Festival

Background information
- Origin: Zürich, Switzerland
- Genres: Melodic techno; house
- Occupations: Record producer; DJ
- Years active: 2009–present
- Labels: Afterlife; Siamese; X Recordings; Diynamic; Ultra
- Members: Adrian Schweizer; Adrian Shala
- Website: https://www.adriatique.ch/

Adriatique is a Swiss electronic music producer and DJ duo consisting of Adrian Shala and Adrian Schweizer. They first met in 2008 and have been producing and playing electronic music as Adriatique since 2009, mainly house and techno.

== Career ==
=== 2009–2011: Formation and Early Releases ===
The two met around 2008 within the local club scene and quickly identified shared musical affinities, deciding to collaborate on productions and live performances as a duo. The name “Adriatique” derives from the fact that both members are named Adrian, reflecting the project’s joint identity.

Their first releases came in 2011, including the tracks “The L. Way” and “Deep In The Three”, followed by the EP Playground, which helped introduce the duo to the European underground scene. During this early period, Adriatique also began performing in local clubs across Switzerland and nearby cities, gradually developing their signature style characterized by melodic elements and deep atmospheres within house and techno music.

2012–2016: Global Recognition and Early EPs

After gaining recognition in 2012, Adriatique became affiliated with Diynamic Music, the label founded by DJ Solomun. In 2016, they launched their own label, Siamese, which serves both as a platform for emerging artists and as a creative outlet for the duo’s own productions. In 2017, Adriatique recorded an Essential Mix for BBC Radio 1. The duo also won three awards at the Swiss Nightlife Awards.

2016–2018: Nude Album

Adriatique also signed with the labels Diynamic and Afterlife (the label founded by Tale Of Us). Their debut album and, to date, only full-length studio album, Nude, was released on September 11, 2018, through Afterlife. The album represented a milestone in the duo’s career, expanding their musical style and receiving critical acclaim.

Previous works include EPs released through the Cityfox and Culprit labels, as well as remixes for Moby, DJ Hell, M.A.N.D.Y., Marc Romboy, and Stephan Bodzin.

2019–2021: X EP

In 2019, Adriatique released the EP X through Siamese, celebrating ten years of their career. The release was accompanied by an expansion of the label’s activities, which also evolved into a multidisciplinary platform for artists. During this period, the duo maintained a steady output, including tracks such as “Home” (2020), in addition to remixes and collaborations. Siamese established itself as a relevant label within the melodic techno scene.

2022–present

In 2022, the Adriatique duo was invited to remix tracks by several artists, including RÜFÜS DU SOL and the collaboration between Swedish House Mafia and The Weeknd. In December of the same year, they launched "X", a new event series aimed at expanding their international presence and establishing a platform for new musical releases. Throughout 2023, the project held editions in Zurich, Tel Aviv, Ibiza, Beirut, New York, São Paulo, and Amsterdam. Also in 2023, Adriatique performed at the Temple of Hatshepsut, in Luxor, Egypt, during an event organized by the Cercle platform.

Between 2024 and 2026, the duo consolidated its presence on the global festival circuit and expanded its proprietary brand "X". During this period, the duo performed at internationally renowned events such as Coachella and the Ultra Music Festival in 2026, in addition to recurring appearances at Tomorrowland (Belgium and Brazil), Awakenings, and Time Warp. The "X" project expanded to cities such as Rio de Janeiro in 2025 and São Paulo in both 2025 and 2026. In terms of recorded productions, the duo released singles such as "Like A Dream" (2024) and "Lost In The Woods" (2026), as well as official remixes for renowned artists, maintaining their position among the leading names in global melodic techno.

== Awards ==
- Mixmag Awards (2013)
- Swiss Nightlife Award (2014)
- Swiss Nightlife Award (2015)
- Swiss Nightlife Award (2018)
- Electronic Dance Music Awards (EDMAs) (2026)

== Discography ==
Albums
Artist	Album title	Release year	Record label	Comments
Adriatique	FAZE #28: Adriatique	2014	DJ Series	Curated album
Adriatique	Nude	2018	Afterlife Recordings	
Adriatique	Nude (Remixes)	2019	Afterlife Recordings	Remix album

Singles
Artist	Song title	Release year	Record label	Comment
Adriatique	The L. Way	2011	2DIY4	
Adriatique	Deep In The Three	2011	Diynamic Music	
Adriatique	Trigger Dance	2012	Culprit	
Adriatique	Son Of A Cheater	2012	Cityfox	
Adriatique	Roads	2012	Diynamic Music	
Adriatique	Life Is A Pitch	2012	Cityfox	
Adriatique	All The Ladies	2012	Wolf & Lamb	
Adriatique	Catch The Light	2013	Diynamic Music	
Adriatique	Space Knights	2014	Cityfox	
Adriatique	Jekaterinenburg	2016	Diynamic Music	Part of 10 Years Diynamic Compilation album
Adriatique	Something In Between	2017	Siamese	Part of Siamese Anthology I
Adriatique	Grinding Rhythm	2018	Siamese	Part of Siamese Anthology II
Adriatique ft. Marino Canal & Delhia De France	Home	2020	Siamese	
Adriatique	Arcade Mode	2022	DGTL	
Adriatique & Eynka	Beyond Us (Hatshepsut Version	2023	Cercle Records	
Adriatique & Marino Canal	Desire	2023	Siamese	
Adriatique & WhoMadeWho	Miracle	2023	Rose Avenue	
Adriatique & Gordo	With You	2023	Ultra Records	

EPs
Artist	EP title	Release year	Record label
Adriatique	Playground	2011	Suruba
Adriatique	Feeling Good	2012	OFF Recordings
Adriatique	Ain't Nobody	2012	Hive Recordings
Adriatique	Face To Face	2012	Culprit
Adriatique	Bodymovin'	2012	Wolf & Lamb
Adriatique	Lophobia	2013	Diynamic Music
Adriatique	Midnight Walking	2014	Culprit
Adriatique	Rollox	2014	Diynamic Music
Adriatique	Soul Valley	2016	Cityfox
Adriatique	Patterns of Eternity	2016	Siamese
Adriatique	Ray	2018	Afterlife Recordings
Adriatique	X	2019	Siamese
Adriatique	All I Ever Wanted	2022	Siamese
Adriatique	Live and Love	2022	Siamese

Remixes
Artist	Song title	Release year	Record label
Nhan Solo	I Wanna Be High (Adriatique Remix)	2012	Mother
Finnebassen	Footsteps (Adriatique Remix)	2012	Supernature
Daniel Kyo	All I Want (Adriatique Remix)	2012	Drumpoet
Kraak & Smaak	The Future Is Yours (Adriatique Illusion Rework)	2013	Jalapeño
M.A.N.D.Y. & Lopazz	Feel It In Your Brain (Adriatique Remix)	2013	Cityfox
Gorje Hewek & Ishevski	Voltiger (Adriatique Remix)	2013	Highway Rec
Edu Imbernon	Fayer (Adriatique Remix)	2013	Culprit
Thyladomid ft. Mâhfoud	The Real Thing (Adriatique Remix)	2014	Diynamic Music
Flowers & Sea Creatures	Very Next Day (Adriatique Remix)	2014	My Favourite Robot
WhoMadeWho	Dreams (Adriatique Remix)	2015	Fayer
Of Norway ft. Linnea Dale	Spirit Lights (Adriatique Remix)	2015	Connaisseur
Butch ft. Hohberg	The Spirit (Adriatique's 7am Remix)	2015	Watergate
Moby	Wait For Me (Adriatique Remix)	2016	2DIY4
Marc Romboy & Stephan Bodzin	Atlas (Adriatique Remix)	2016	Systematic Recordings
Tale Of Us, Vaal	Monument (Adriatique Remix)	2017	Afterlife Recordings
Andre Lodemann	Birth (Adriatique Remix)	2017	Best Works Records
Mathame	Never Give Up (Adriatique Remix)	2020	B1 Recordings GmbH
Howling, RY X & Frank Wiedemann	Need You Now (Adriatique Remix)	2020	Counter Records
Matthew Dekay	Heimreise (Adriatique Remix)	2020	Siamese
Shiffer	Memento (Adriatique Remix)	2021	Siamese
WhoMadeWho	Silence & Secrets (Adriatique Remix)	2022	Embassy One
Stephan Bodzin	River (Adriatique Remix)	2022	Herzblut Recordings
Johannes Brecht & Luke Marzec	Voicing Something (Adriatique Remix)	2022	Siamese
RÜFÜS DU SOL	On My Knees (Adriatique Remix)	2022	Rose Avenue Records
Swedish House Maffia & The Weeknd	Moth To A Flame (Adriatique Remix)	2022	SSA Recordings
Nuage & Benjamin Yellowitz	Orbit (Adriatique & Ae:ther Remix)	2022	House of Youth
Elderbrook	I Need You (Adriatique	2023	Mine Recordings
