= Sofie Royer =

- Born: August 9, 1991 (age 35)
- Origin: Vienna, Austria
- Genres: Synth-pop; pop
- Years active: 2016–present
- Label: Stones Throw
- Website: sofie.info

Sofie Fatouretchi Royer (born August 9, 1991), aka Sofie Royer, is an Austrian artist and musician signed to Stones Throw.

== Biography ==
Born to Iranian and Austrian parents in California, Royer began her studies in violin and viola at the Vienna Conservatoire. She withdrew from the institution to live between New York, London and Los Angeles, while she held a key role at Boiler Room in creative direction and business development, and was an NTS Radio resident DJ. During her time in Los Angeles, she worked at Stones Throw and brought artists including Mndsgn and Stimulator Jones to the label, as well as releasing her compilation Sofie's SOS Tape in 2016.

In 2020, Sofie Royer released her self-produced debut album Cult Survivor, a collection of leftfield pop songs, on Stones Throw. In 2022, Sofie announced her second album for Stones Throw, Harlequin, with the single “Feeling Bad Forsyth Street”. The album blends Sofie's nostalgia for early aughts reality television and American mall punk subculture, with her passion for her native city Vienna's opera, ballet traditions and medieval performances. For the release, she collaborated on two music videos with Eugene Kotlyarenko who directed the satirical black comedy film Spree. Harlequin was released on 23 September 2022.

In 2022, Sofie Royer featured on Toro y Moi’s album Mahal, and has previously collaborated with other musicians including MISS WORLD, Onoe Caponoe, &ME and others.

In addition to her work in music, Sofie also studies Philosophy, Psychology and English at the Universitaet Wien, as well as painting at the University of Applied Arts, and plays violin with the Wiener Akademische Philharmonie. As an active artist, she has exhibited her work at L Art Galerie in Salzburg and at Pina in Vienna.

== Discography ==
=== Studio albums ===
Title	Album details
Sofie's SOS Tape	Released: 16 December 2016; Label: Stones Throw; Format: Digital download | Vinyl
Cult Survivor	Released: 26 June 2020; Label: Stones Throw; Format: Digital download | Vinyl
Harlequin	Released: 23 September 2022; Label: Stones Throw; Format: Digital download | Vinyl
Young-Girl Forever	Released: 15 November 2024; Label: Stones Throw; Format: Digital download | Vinyl
before/after	Released: 4 September 2026; Label: Stones Throw; Format: Digital download | Vinyl

=== Singles ===
List of Singles
Title	Album details
99 Glimpses	Released: 3 December 2019; Label: Stones Throw; Format: Digital download
Asleep	Released: 22 April 2020; Label: Stones Throw; Format: Digital download
Try to Reach Me	Released: 18 May 2020; Label: Stones Throw; Format: Digital download
Guest	Released: 24 June 2020; Label: Stones Throw; Format: Digital download
In The Park	Released: 14 August 2020; Label: Public Possession; Format: Digital download
Melody (with Peanut Butter Wolf and MISS WORLD)	Released: 15 December 2020; Label: Stones Throw; Format: Digital download
Leave (with Speckman)	Released: 28 July 2021; Label: Public Possession; Format: Digital download
Schweden Espresso	Released: 3 May 2022; Label: Stones Throw; Format: Digital download
Baker Miller Pink	Released: 22 June 2022; Label: Stones Throw; Format: Digital download
Feeling Bad Forsyth Street	Released: 26 July 2022; Label: Stones Throw; Format: Digital download
Cheerleader (Club Mix) (with Speckman)	Released: 16 August 2022; Label: Public Possession; Format: Digital download
Mio	Released: 10 May 2023; Label: Stones Throw; Format: Digital download
Paris is burning (with Alexander Dexter Jones)	Released: 19 March 2024; Label: Stones Throw; Format: Digital download
I Forget (I'm So Young)	Released: 21 August 2024; Label: Stones Throw; Format: Digital download
Young-Girl (Illusion)	Released: 24 September 2024; Label: Stones Throw; Format: Digital download
