= Tale of Us =

Italian musical duo

- Origin: Milan, Italy
- Genres: Techno; house; ambient
- Years active: 2008–present
- Labels: Barraca Music; Visionquest; Life and Death; Minus; R&S Records; Afterlife; Deutsche Grammophon/Universal Classics
- Members: Carmine Conte (MRAK); Matteo Milleri (Anyma)

Tale of Us is an Italian electronic music production and DJ duo consisting of Carmine Conte (MRAK) and Matteo Milleri (Anyma). Formed in Milan in 2008 and subsequently based in Berlin, Germany, the duo rose to international prominence in the 2010s with a melodic, emotionally charged approach to techno and house music.

After early releases on labels such as Visionquest, Life and Death, Minus, and R&S Records, the duo signed with the classical label Deutsche Grammophon and published their debut album, Endless, in 2017. In 2016, they founded Afterlife, a record label and event series. Tale of Us appeared in the Grand Theft Auto Online update After Hours in 2018 and performed at the Coachella festival in 2019 and 2023.

Since 2021, both members have led solo projects, Milleri as Anyma and Conte as MRAK. The duo have not performed together since January 2025, and later that year, the Afterlife brand was relaunched as a standalone festival series whose stages are curated separately by the two members.

== History ==
=== Formation and early years (2008–2012) ===
Carmine Conte was born in Toronto, Canada, and Matteo Milleri in New York City. They both moved to Italy at a young age and met in Milan in 2008 while studying sound engineering at the SAE Institute. They took the name Tale of Us from the Supermayer song "Two of Us" and relocated to Berlin in 2009 to concentrate on music, releasing their first EP, Upon a Time, on the label Barraca Music, in early 2010.

The duo attracted wider attention in 2010 with their remix of Thugfucker's "Disco Gnome", the first release on the Life and Death label, which they ran together with Thugfucker's Greg Oreck and Manfredo Romani (DJ Tennis). Around the same time, Milleri met the American DJ Seth Troxler at the Florence club Tenax, a meeting that led to the Tale of US EP Dark Song, released in 2011 on Troxler's label Visionquest.

=== Breakthrough (2013–2015) ===
In 2013, Tale of Us issued the EP Another Earth on Richie Hawtin's label Minus, a release Conte later described as the starting point of the duo's turn toward a more melodic style of techno. The same year, they issued the split EP Fresh Water with the German band the/Das on Life and Death, mixed an edition of the Renaissance: The Mix Collection series, and scored a club hit with their remix of Mano Le Tough's "Changing Days".

Tale of Us became internationally in-demand DJs, holding a residency at the Ibiza club DC10 and producing remixes for artists including Caribou, Gui Boratto, and Plastikman. The split EP Concor, with Vaal, followed in 2014, and in 2015, they released North Star / Silent Space on R&S Records and the single "Astral" with Mind Against on Life and Death. In December 2015, Mixmag named Tale of Us its DJs of the year.

=== Afterlife and Endless (2016–2019) ===
In 2016, the duo launched a party series called Afterlife at the Ibiza club Space, with guests including Dixon, Recondite, Âme, Marcel Dettmann, and DJ Harvey, and founded a record label of the same name, which began releasing music in July. The label's early output included the Realm of Consciousness compilation series.

In 2017, Tale of Us signed with Deutsche Grammophon and released their debut album, Endless, a largely beatless, piano-based ambient record that has been described as the first album of original material issued by the classical label from a club act. It was followed the same year by Endless Remixes and by the split EP Monument, with Vaal. In February 2018, the duo mixed fabric 97, the 97th instalment of the mix series of the London club fabric.

In 2018, Tale of Us was featured in an update for Grand Theft Auto Online called After Hours, and DJ Mag named them one of the top 100 alternative DJs of the year. In 2019, they performed at the Coachella festival, and they returned for another performance at the 2023 event. The duo also held multiple summer residencies with Afterlife at Hï Ibiza.

=== Solo projects and later years (2020–2024) ===
In 2020, Tale of Us, credited alongside Milleri's Anyma alias, remixed Moby's "My Only Love". In 2021, they released the single "Nova Two" on Afterlife.

The same year, Milleri launched Anyma, a solo project combining music with digital art, while Conte began releasing solo material as MRAK, whose EPs One (2021) and Manifesto (2023) were issued on Afterlife. Conte debuted his MRAK live show, We Don't Follow, at the London venue Printworks, in November 2022.

Tale of Us continued to headline major festivals, appearing at Tomorrowland every year from 2017; Afterlife later hosted the festival's Freedom Stage across both weekends. In August 2023, Afterlife entered a partnership with Interscope Records, and in October of that year, the brand organized two shows at Los Angeles State Historic Park, closed by Tale of Us, which also featured Anyma's Genesys show and MRAK's We Don't Follow. Milleri's solo career grew increasingly prominent following the release of his albums Genesys (2023) and Genesys II (2024).

=== Hiatus and Afterlife restructuring (2024–present) ===
In July 2024, it was announced that Milleri would headline Afterlife presents Anyma: The End of Genesys, a residency at the Sphere in Las Vegas, which made him the first electronic music act to headline the venue; around 100,000 tickets for the first six shows were reported sold in less than 24 hours. The residency concluded in March 2025.

Tale of Us performed at an Afterlife event in Abu Dhabi in December 2024 and at Afterlife Tulum, held at the Zamna venue in Tulum, Mexico, in January 2025. In early 2025, several dance-music outlets noted that the duo had not released original material since 2021 and had no further joint bookings, and they reported growing speculation about the project's future. As of early 2025, neither member had publicly commented on the status of Tale of Us.

In February 2025, Afterlife announced its first standalone festivals, planned for Mexico City and Barcelona, with each festival day curated individually by Anyma or MRAK.

== Musical style ==
Tale of Us's early productions have been characterised as restrained but highly emotive tech house, later evolving toward melodic techno. Conte has cited Another Earth (2013) as the beginning of the duo's more melodic direction. With Endless (2017), the pair moved into ambient and modern classical territory, building the album around piano and orchestral textures. Their DJ sets and Afterlife shows place a strong emphasis on atmosphere and visual production.

== Discography ==
Studio albums

- Endless (2017)

Remix albums

- Endless Remixes (2017)

Mix albums

- Renaissance: The Mix Collection (2013)
- fabric 97 (2018)

EPs

- Upon a Time (2010)
- Dark Song (2011)
- Another Earth (2013)
- North Star / Silent Space (2015)

Split EPs

- Fresh Water (with the/Das) (2013)
- Concor (with Vaal) (2014)
- Monument (with Vaal) (2017)

Singles

- "Astral" (with Mind Against) (2015)
- "Monument Remixes" (with Vaal) (2017)
- "Nova Two" (2021)

Selected remixes

- Thugfucker – "Disco Gnome (Tale of Us Remix)" (2010)
- Mano Le Tough – "Changing Days (Tale of Us Remix)" (2013)
- Moby – "My Only Love (Tale of Us & Anyma Remix)" (2020)

Compilations curated

- Realm of Consciousness series (Afterlife)
