= Melodic techno =

Subgenre of electronic music

- Stylistic origins: Techno; minimal techno; progressive house; trance; ambient; deep house
- Cultural origins: Late 2000s and early 2010s, Europe (primarily in Germany)
- Typical instruments: Synthesizer; drum machine; sequencer; electronic drums; personal computer; digital audio workstation

Subgenres
- Melodic progressive techno; cinematic techno; atmospheric techno

Fusion genres
- Tech house; progressive house; trance; ambient house; downtempo

Local scenes
- Berlin; Cologne; Milan; Amsterdam; London; São Paulo

Other topics
- Afterlife; Innervisions; Diynamic; Beatport; ARTBAT; Tale of Us

Melodic techno is a subgenre of techno, characterized by the combination of repetitive rhythmic structures with a greater emphasis on melodies, harmonic progressions, and immersive atmospheres. Developed primarily in Europe between the late 2000s and the early 2010s, the genre incorporates influences from progressive house, trance, and ambient music, distinguishing itself by blending the structural foundation of techno with a more emotional and cinematic sonic approach.

The genre established itself internationally during the second half of the 2010s, driven by artists such as Tale of Us, ARTBAT, Stephan Bodzin, and Âme, alongside record labels like Afterlife and Innervisions. Today, it is considered one of the most popular streams of contemporary electronic music, with a strong presence at international festivals and across major specialized digital platforms.

== Characteristics ==
Melodic techno is characterized by the combination of the repetitive and hypnotic rhythmic structure of techno with a greater emphasis on harmonic progressions, melodic development, and atmospheric construction. Although its structural foundation derives directly from techno, particularly in its constant four-on-the-floor pulse and the use of minimalist percussive patterns, the genre distinguishes itself through its focus on extended sonic narratives, emotional textures, and arrangements that favor gradual evolution over abrupt changes.

Compositions typically feature a tempo ranging between 120 and 128 beats per minute (BPM), with deep and continuous basslines, multi-layered synthesizers, sequenced arpeggios, atmospheric pads, and the frequent use of reverberation, delay, and filter automation to create a sense of spatial depth. Melodic elements are usually constructed in minor scales or musical modes that reinforce an introspective, melancholic, or cinematic aesthetic, frequently drawing from ambient, progressive house, and trance influences.

When mixing for live performances and DJ sets, melodic techno typically favors long, gradual transitions between tracks, often based on harmonic mixing and the overlapping of melodic layers to preserve emotional continuity and tonal coherence throughout the performance. In contrast to more aggressive or percussion-oriented techno styles, mixing within the genre frequently emphasizes narrative construction, progressive dynamics, and atmospheric immersion, with DJs commonly utilizing additional effects, loops, and the real-time manipulation of equalization and filters.

A production is generally categorized as melodic techno when it retains the characteristic rhythmic foundation of techno—marked by repetition, minimalism, and dancefloor functionality—while incorporating a prominent melodic and emotional focus as central elements of the composition. This interplay between mechanical precision and musical expressiveness is frequently cited as the genre's primary defining characteristic, positioning it between the structural tradition of techno and the more emotive, cinematic approaches of contemporary electronic music.

== History ==
Melodic techno emerged as an evolution of contemporary techno, consolidating between the late 2000s and early 2010s, primarily in Europe, particularly Germany, as a result of the progressive incorporation of melodic, harmonic, and atmospheric elements into the traditional rhythmic structure of techno. While its structural foundations remain linked to the Detroit techno tradition, European artists began exploring a more emotional and cinematic approach, drawing the genre closer to influences from progressive house, trance, and ambient. Record labels such as Kompakt and Innervisions were instrumental in shaping this early aesthetic by promoting releases that combined rhythmic minimalism with greater melodic depth. Among the pioneering artists of the genre are Âme, Stephan Bodzin, Tale of Us, Mind Against, and Adriatique, who are frequently credited with consolidating the sonic language that would define modern melodic techno.

The commercial consolidation of melodic techno occurred during the second half of the 2010s, especially following the creation of the Afterlife record label in 2016 by the DJ duo Tale of Us. The label became one of the primary platforms for spreading the genre, pairing its sonic identity with immersive audiovisual performances and a futuristic aesthetic that significantly expanded the style's international popularity. Concurrently, other record labels such as Innervisions, Diynamic, and Upperground contributed to diversifying and expanding the genre's reach.

The Ukrainian duo ARTBAT is frequently cited as one of the key figures responsible for the global popularization of melodic techno. Since their formation in 2014, the duo achieved international prominence and established themselves among the most influential names in the genre, repeatedly topping the charts on specialized platforms like Beatport, where several of their tracks remained among the top sellers for multiple weeks.> Their success contributed significantly to broadening the commercial visibility of melodic techno and introducing the genre to wider audiences and major international festivals.

In the 2020s, a new wave of artists began updating the genre and expanding its stylistic boundaries. Notable names include Anyma (one half of Tale of Us), Kevin de Vries, Massano, CamelPhat, Mats Kedrren, Chris Avantgarde, and Adam Sellouk. Beyond artists primarily dedicated to the genre, several producers traditionally linked to other electronic music styles have also released tracks classified as melodic techno, including Solomun, Maceo Plex, Yotto, and Boris Brejcha, highlighting the aesthetic permeability of the style.

The genre's growth can also be observed on specialized platforms like Beatport, where the "Melodic House & Techno" category became one of the most popular in the digital electronic market during the 2020s, frequently recording high commercial performance from melodic techno artists. Tracks released by artists such as ARTBAT, Anyma, and Tale of Us have repeatedly featured among the platform's top-selling releases, reflecting the growing global demand for the genre.

Among the main festivals and events associated with melodic techno are the Afterlife showcases, Tomorrowland, Awakenings, Time Warp, and the Zamna Festival, where the genre occupies a central space in line-ups and large-scale audiovisual productions. The association between music, visual storytelling, and technology has become one of the primary elements responsible for the contemporary identity of melodic techno, contributing to its consolidation as one of the most influential streams of global electronic music.
