= Krewella discography =

Discography

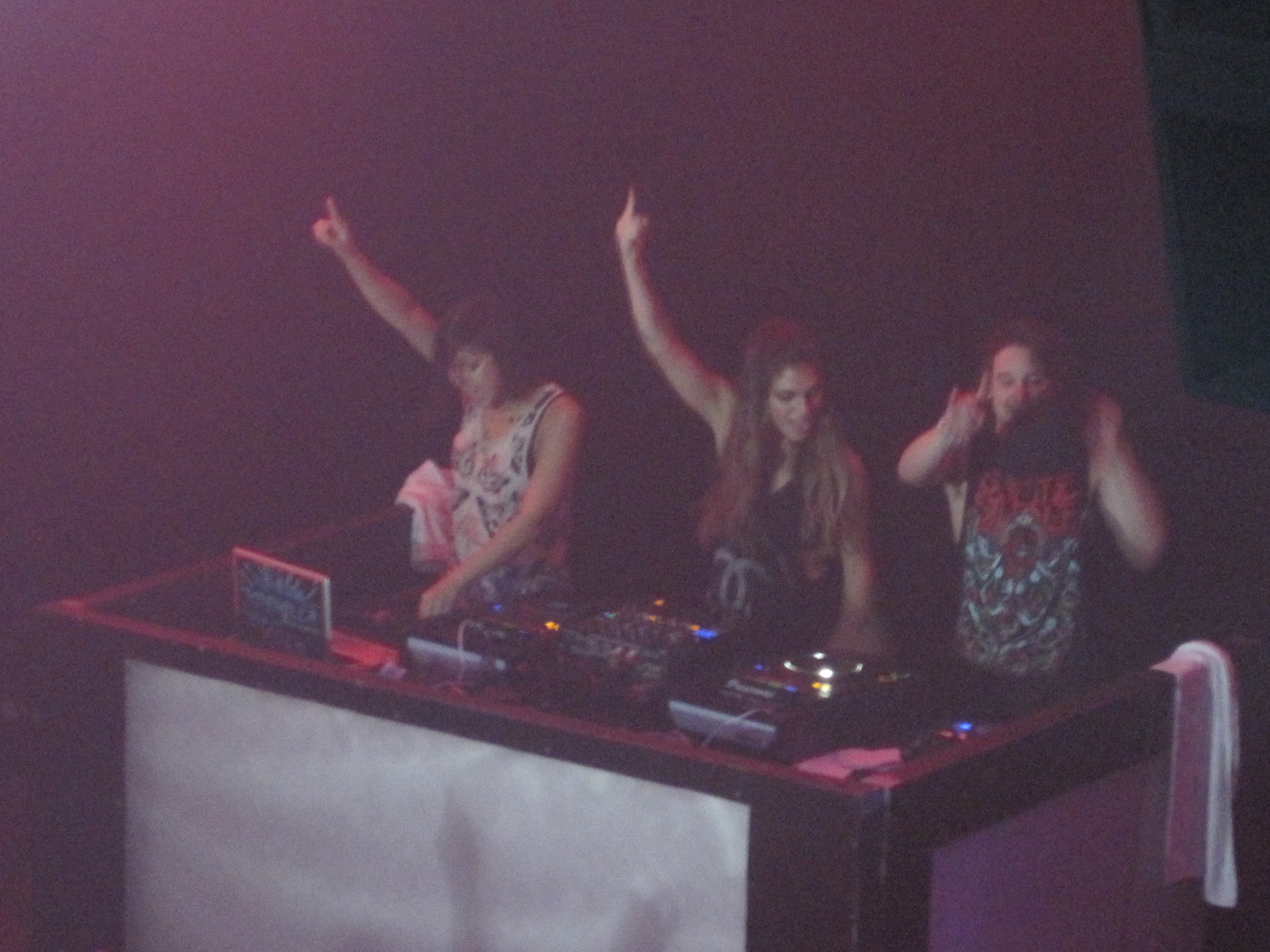
- Krewella in 2012.
- Studio albums: 4
- EPs: 3
- Singles: 44
- Music videos: 31

This is the discography for American electronic dance music band Krewella.

== Studio albums ==
List of studio albums, with selected chart positions
Title	Details	Peak chart positions						
Title	Details	US	US Dance	AUS	CAN	JPN	NZ	UK
Get Wet	Released: September 24, 2013; Label: Columbia Records; Formats: CD, digital download	8	1	45	14	55	40	179
Zer0	Released: January 31, 2020; Label: Mixed Kids Records; Formats: Vinyl, digital download, streaming	—	23	—	—	—	—	—
The Body Never Lies	Released: March 4, 2022; Label: Mixed Kids Records; Formats: Vinyl, digital download, streaming	—	—	—	—	—	—	—
PEAK	Released: September 4, 2026; Label: Mixed Kids Records; Formats: Vinyl, digital download, streaming	—	—	—	—	—	—	—
"—" denotes a recording that did not chart or was not released.

== Extended plays ==
List of extended plays, with selected chart positions
Title	Details	Peak chart positions	
Title	Details	US Dance	US Heat.
Play Hard	Released: June 18, 2012; Label: Krewella Music, LLC.; Formats: CD, digital download	6	2
Ammunition	Released: May 20, 2016; Label: Columbia Records; Formats: Vinyl, Digital download	2	—
New World Pt. 1	Released: June 8, 2017; Label: Mixed Kids Records; Formats: Vinyl, Digital download	25	—
"—" denotes a recording that did not chart or was not released in that territory.

== Singles ==
=== As lead artist ===
List of singles as lead artist, with selected chart positions, showing year released and album name
Title	Year	Peak chart positions							Certifications	Album
Title	Year	US	US Dance	AUS	BEL (WA) Tip	CAN	FRA	NLD	Certifications	Album
"Life of the Party" (Note: Free release) (featuring S-Preme)	2011	—	—	—	—	—	—	—		Non-album singles
"Strobelights"	2011	—	—	—	—	—	—	—		Non-album singles
"One Minute"	2011	—	34	—	—	—	—	—		Play Hard
"Killin' It"	2012	—	—	—	—	—	—	—		Play Hard and Get Wet
"Come & Get It"	2012	—	41	—	—	—	—	—		Play Harder and Get Wet
"Alive"	2012	32	5	—	22	50	159	81	RIAA: Platinum	Play Hard and Get Wet
"Live for the Night"	2013	100	11	87	—	96	—	—		Get Wet
"Legacy" (with Nicky Romero)	2013	—	—	44	—	—	—	—		Non-album singles
"Party Monster"	2013	—	—	—	—	—	—	—		Non-album singles
"Watercolour" (Note: Original by Pendulum) (featuring Evan Duffy)	2013	—	—	—	—	—	—	—		Non-album singles
"Enjoy the Ride"	2013	—	29	84	19	—	—	—		Get Wet
"Say Goodbye"	2014	—	—	—	—	—	—	—		Non-album singles
"Somewhere to Run"	2015	—	—	—	—	—	—	—		Non-album singles
"Beggars" (with Diskord)	2016	—	33	—	—	—	—	—		Ammunition
"Broken Record"	2016	—	—	—	—	—	—	—		Ammunition
"Team"	2016	—	26	—	—	—	—	—		New World, Pt. 1
"Be There"	2017	—	—	—	—	—	—	—		New World, Pt. 1
"Love Outta Me"	2017	—	—	—	—	—	—	—		New World, Pt. 1
"New World" (with Yellow Claw featuring Taylor Bennett)	2017	—	29	—	—	—	—	—		Non-album singles
"dead af"	2017	—	—	—	—	—	—	—		Non-album singles
"Alarm" (with Lookas)	2017	—	—	—	—	—	—	—		Lucid
"Ain't That Why" (with R3hab)	2017	—	23	—	—	—	—	—		The Wave
"Angels Cry"	2018	—	—	—	—	—	—	—		Non-album singles
"New World" (with Yellow Claw featuring Vava)	2018	—	—	—	—	—	—	—		Non-album singles
"Alibi"	2018	—	—	—	—	—	—	—		Non-album singles
"Bitch of the Year" (Note: For International Women's Day)	2018	—	—	—	—	—	—	—		Non-album singles
"Runaway"	2018	—	—	—	—	—	—	—		Non-album singles
"Gold Wings" (with Shaun Frank)	2018	—	—	—	—	—	—	—		Non-album singles
"Mine" (Note: Original by Bazzi) (featuring BKaye)	2018	—	—	—	—	—	—	—		DisCovered, Vol. 1
"Bad Liar"	2018	—	—	—	—	—	—	—		Non-album singles
"Runaway" (Note: For Coke Studio Pakistan) (with Riaz Qadri and Ghulam Ali Qadri)	2018	—	—	—	—	—	—	—		Non-album singles
"Mana"	2019	—	—	—	—	—	—	—		Zer0
"Ghost"	2019	—	—	—	—	—	—	—		Zer0
"Good on You" (with Nucleya)	2019	—	—	—	—	—	—	—		Zer0
"Greenlights"	2020	—	21	—	—	—	—	—		Zer0
"Goddess" (with Nervo featuring Raja Kumari)	2020	—	—	—	—	—	—	—		Non-album singles
"Rewind" (with Yellow Claw)	2020	—	—	—	—	—	—	—		Non-album singles
"Never Been Hurt" (with BEAUZ)	2021	—	—	—	—	—	—	—		The Body Never Lies
"No Control" (with MADGRRL)	2021	—	—	—	—	—	—	—		The Body Never Lies
"I'm Just a Monster Underneath, My Darling"	2022	—	—	—	—	—	—	—		The Body Never Lies
"Drive Away"	2022	—	48	—	—	—	—	—		The Body Never Lies
"Crying On The Dancefloor"	2025	—	—	—	—	—	—	—		PEAK
"Eternal"	2025	—	—	—	—	—	—	—		PEAK
"Without You"	2026	—	—	—	—	—	—	—		PEAK
"Moondance" (with MERCY.MERCY.MERCY.)	2026	—	—	—	—	—	—	—		Non-album single
"Something Sacred"	2026	—	—	—	—	—	—	—		PEAK
"the blueprint"	2026	—	—	—	—	—	—	—		PEAK
"One Life" with Manila Killa	2026	—	—	—	—	—	—	—		Non-album single
"—" denotes a recording that did not chart or was not released in that territory.

=== As featured artist ===
List of singles as featured artist, with selected chart positions, showing year released and album name
Title	Year	Peak chart positions	Album
Title	Year	RO	Album
"Rise & Fall" (Adventure Club featuring Krewella)	2012	—	Non-album singles
"United Kids of the World" (Headhunterz featuring Krewella)	2013	—	Non-album singles
"Lights & Thunder" (Gareth Emery featuring Krewella)	2014	—	Drive (Note: Also featured as a bonus track on Get Wet for iTunes)
"Superstar" (Pegboard Nerds and NGHTMRE featuring Krewella)	2016	—	Non-album singles
"Another Round" (Pegboard Nerds featuring Krewella)	2017	—	Non-album singles
"No Regrets" (KSHMR and Yves V featuring Krewella)	2019	84	Non-album singles
"Next Life" (Adventure Club and Crankdat featuring Krewella)	2019	—	Love // Chaos
"—" denotes a recording that did not chart or was not released in that territory.

=== Guest appearances ===
List of non-single guest appearances, with other performing artists, showing year released and album name
Title	Year	Peak chart positions	Album
Title	Year	US Dance	Album
"Set Yourself Free" Tiësto featuring Krewella	2014	—	A Town Called Paradise
"Soldier" Jauz & Krewella	2018	—	The Wise and the Wicked
"Lay It Down" Illenium, Krewella & SLANDER	2021	19	Fallen Embers

=== Remixes ===
List of remixes, showing year released and original artists
Title	Year	Original artist(s)
"Breathe" (Note: Based on a demo of Summit)	2011	Skrillex
"Fire Hive"	2012	Knife Party
"Rise & Fall"	2012	Adventure Club featuring Krewella
"Alone Together"	2013	Fall Out Boy

== Music videos ==
Title	Year	Director(s)
"Killin' It"	2012	Laine Kelly
"Feel Me"	2012	Miles Evert
"Alive"	2012	Bryan Schlam
"Live For The Night"	2013	Aggressive
"Legacy" with Nicky Romero	2013	Kyle Padilla
"United Kids of the World" Headhunterz featuring Krewella	2013	Robby Starbuck
"Human"	2014	Miles Evert
"Enjoy The Ride"	2014	K Tanch
"Party Monster"	2014	MIXED MEDIA
"Somewhere To Run"	2015	Rory Kramer
"Beggars" with DISKORD	2016	Laine Kelly & Brandon Parker
"Superstar" Pegboard Nerds & NGHTMRE featuring Krewella	2016	Anthony Sylvester
"Broken Record"	2016	John Curtis
"Team"	2016	Nathan Lim
"Be There"	2017	Brandon Parker
"Fortune" featuring DISKORD	2017	MIXED MEDIA
"Ain't That Why" with R3HAB	2017	—N/a
"New World" with Yellow Claw featuring Vava	2018	Pako
"Alibi"	2018	MIXED MEDIA
"BITCH OF THE YEAR"	2018	Brandon Parker
"Runaway"	2018	Blunt Action
"Alarm" with Lookas	2018	Melted Face Production
"No Regrets" KSHMR & Yves V featuring Krewella	2019	—N/a
"Mana"	2019	Gabyo
"Ghost"	2019	Andrew Sandler & Lauren Dunn
"Good On You" with Nucleya	2019	Daniel Malikyar & Karl Jungquist
"Greenlights"	2020	Karl Jungquist & Lucas MK
"Rewind" with Yellow Claw	2020	Yudhistira Israel
"Never Been Hurt" with BEAUZ	2021	—N/a
"No Control" with MADGRRL	2021	Olivia Van Rye
"Drive Away"	2022	MOM
"Moondance" with MERCY. MERCY. MERCY.	2026	Devin Oliver

== Remix compilations ==
- Play Harder (2012)
- Come & Get It (The Remixes) (2013)
- Live For The Night (Remix EP) (2013)
- Legacy (The Remixes) (2013)
- Enjoy The Ride (The Remixes) (2014)
- Broken Record (Remixes) (2016)
- Ammunition: The Remixes (2016)
- New World Pt. 1: The Remixes (2017)
- Alibi & Runaway (Remixes) (2018)
- Mana (Remixes) (2019)
- zer0 (The Remixes, pt. 1) (2020)
- zer0 (The Remixes, pt. 2) (2020)
- Never Been Hurt (Remixes) (2022)
- Drive Away (The Remixes) (2022)

== DJ Mixes ==
Troll Mixes

- 2012 Troll Mix Vol. 1: Fuck Finals Edition
- 2013 Troll Mix Vol. 2: Road to Ultra
- 2013 Troll Mix Vol. 3: Makeout Edition
- 2013 Troll Mix Vol. 4: Get Ripped or Die Trying
- 2013 Troll Mix Vol. 5: Get Wet Edition
- 2013 Troll Mix Vol. 6: Trick or Troll Edition
- 2013 Troll Mix Vol. 7: Jingle Troll Rock
- 2013 Troll Mix Vol. 8: Happy Krew Year
- 2014 Troll Mix Vol. 9: Just The Tip *Valentine's Day Edition*
- 2014 Troll Mix Vol. 10: Pre-Game Edition
- 2014 Troll Mix Vol. 11: Road to Coachella
- 2014 Troll Mix Vol. 12: To 150 BPM & Beyond
- 2014 Troll Mix Vol. 13: Sex on the Dance Floor
- 2015 Troll Mix Vol. 14: Return of the Trolls
- 2016 Troll Mix Vol. 15: Sweatbox Edition
- 2017 Troll Mix Vol. 16: Winter Remedy Mix
- 2017 Troll Mix Vol. 17: Weekend Warriors
- 2017 Troll Mix Vol. 18: Troll Mix & Chill
- 2017 Troll Mix Vol. 19: New World Tour Pre-game Mix
- 2017 Troll Mix Vol. 20: dead af edition
- 2019 Troll Mix Vol. 21: Spooky Season 2019
- 2020 Troll Mix Vol. 22: Quarantine Vibe Check
- 2021 Troll Mix Vol. 23: Only Trolls Fall In Love

== As Yyousaf ==
In October 2026, Yasmine of Krewella unveiled a solo project under the name Yyousaf.

Singles
Title	Year
"Bodies in the Club"	2026
"LAST NAME" with MERCY.MERCY.MERCY.	2026
