= Zer0 (album) =

zer0

Studio album by Krewella
- Released: January 31, 2020
- Genres: Electronic, EDM, trap, future bass, moombahton, electropop
- Length: 35:14
- Label: Mixed Kids Records

Krewella chronology
New World Pt. 1 (2017)	zer0 (2020)	The Body Never Lies (2022)

Singles from zer0
- 1. "Mana" Released: August 22, 2019; 2. "Ghost" Released: October 18, 2019; 3. "Good On You" Released: December 3, 2019; 4. "Greenlights" Released: January 17, 2020

Zer0 (stylized as zer0) is the second studio album by American electronic dance music duo Krewella. It was released on January 31, 2020, on their independent label Mixed Kids Records. It was Krewella's first album since their debut album Get Wet in 2013, and their first since the departure of Kris "Rain Man" Trindl in 2014. It was preceded by four singles, "Mana", "Ghost", "Good On You" (with Nucleya) and "Greenlights".

== Background ==
Krewella's previous body of work was an extended play titled "New World Pt. 1" released on June 8, 2017. The second part was initially set to release later that year, and various singles were released in the following months, including the titular "New World" with Yellow Claw.

The first single "Mana" was released on August 22, 2019, alongside a music video created by French creator Gabyo. The second single, "Ghost", was released on October 18.

On December 3, 2019, alongside the release of the album's third single "Good On You", Krewella announced their sophomore album "zer0" set to release on January 31, 2020. In an interview with Billboard, they stated that the album had evolved from the initial New World pt. 2 concept, with Jahan stating that they "ended up going above and beyond what a Pt. II EP would seem like. It felt like something bigger or more meaningful."

The fourth and final single "Greenlights" was released on January 17, 2020, two weeks before the album's release. The song was also used in a campaign for fitness brand Orangetheory.

They also explain the concept of "zero", describing it as the place in between extreme emotions, and finding balance in their careers;

"It's been extremely high highs to extremely low lows. It's taking so much time out of our lives to go tour, and then go back to a lonely hotel room. It's all these crazy things existing together, and that place that Jahan is talking about in the middle, that place called zero, is what we've tried to dig out of ourselves; where the pendulum has stopped swinging from left to right and settles in the middle."

The album draws heavily on the members' Pakistani and multi-cultural heritage. They stated they wanted to "scour the globe for influences for collaborators"; the album includes collaborations with Indian producer Nucleya, Pakistani singer Asim Azhar, American rapper Baby Tate, Venezuelan singer Alaya, and American singer Arrested Youth.

A headline tour was announced for the album, set to begin in April 2020 and included 13 shows across the United States, however it was cancelled due to the COVID-19 pandemic. They partnered with Insomniac Events to create the "zer0 Live Concert Experience" on November 27, 2020; it consisted of a live-streamed live DJ set from Krewella and featured support from SHIVARASA and REAPER.

== Track listing ==
All tracks are written by and produced by Jahan Yousaf, Yasmine Yousaf, & Cody Tarpley.

No.	Title	Writer(s)	Producer(s)	Length
1.	"zer0"			3:47
2.	"Mana" (Extended Mix)	Nicholas Awad	Nicholas Awad	2:58
3.	"Good On You" (with Nucleya)	Udyan Manu Sagar; Dan Henig	Udyan Manu Sagar	2:39
4.	"Anxiety" (featuring Arrested Youth)	Ian Michael Johnson		3:56
5.	"Paradise" (featuring Asim Azhar)	Asim Azhar; Dan Henig		3:34
6.	"Like We" (featuring Baby Tate & Alaya)	Tate Sequoya Farris; Gabriella Micalizzi; Omar Tavarez; Sebastian Jacome; Viktoria Hansen		3:12
7.	"Scissors"	Michael Lindgren; Melanie Fontana	Michael Lindgren	3:37
8.	"Ghost"	Lucas Rego; Dan Henig	Lucas Rego	3:06
9.	"Martyr"			2:37
10.	"Overboard"			3:02
11.	"Greenlights"			2:42

Vinyl Deluxe Edition
No.	Title	Length
12.	"Lay It Down"

=== Remix compilations ===
Two remix compilations for the album were released on March 13 and April 10 2020.

zer0 (The Remixes, Pt. 1)
No.	Title	Length
1.	"Good On You (MOTi Remix)"	2:36
2.	"Like We (Reaper Remix)"	3:25
3.	"Ghost (Lit Lords Remix)"	3:37
4.	"Greenlights (MADGRRL Remix)"	3:12
5.	"Mana (Slippy Remix)"	3:32
Total length:		16:23

zer0 (The Remixes, Pt. 2)
No.	Title	Length
1.	"Anxiety (Prince Fox Remix)"	3:34
2.	"Greenlights (Toneshifterz Remix)"	3:35
3.	"Like We (BEAUZ Remix)"	2:48
4.	"Good On You (SHIVARASA Remix)"	3:19
5.	"Paradise (Futuristic Polar Bears Remix)"	3:29
Total length:		16:46

== Charts ==
=== Album ===
Chart	Peak position
US Top Dance Albums (Billboard)	23

=== Singles ===
Title	Year	Peak chart positions
Title	Year	US Dance
"Greenlights"	2020	21
