= Dan Henig =

American singer-songwriter

- Genres: Pop, rock, acoustic, country
- Occupation: Songwriter
- Instruments: Guitar, piano
- Years active: 2011–present
- Label: Management: TH3RD BRAIN Publishing: And The Melody Is / Kobalt
- Website: www.danhenig.com

Dan Henig is a songwriter from Ann Arbor, Michigan, who resides in Los Angeles, California. He moved to Nashville to write country music in 2014, and moved to Los Angeles in 2015 to pursue writing pop music. He started working with TH3RD BRAIN Management in 2016 after remaining independent for the beginning of his songwriting career. He signed with Ross Golan and Jaime Zeluck's publishing company And The Melody Is in 2019.

He has written songs for Zayn, G-Eazy, Noah Cyrus, 24kGoldn, Chelsea Collins and Conor Matthews, among others.

Henig was the Indie First Place Winner of the American Songwriter 2023 Song Contest.

== Artist/writing discography ==
Year	Artist	Title	Album
2016	Dan Henig	"Hostage"	Paper Planes & Hurricanes
2016	Dan Henig	"Crash & Burn"	Paper Planes & Hurricanes
2016	Dan Henig	"Habit"	Paper Planes & Hurricanes
2016	Dan Henig	"Tell Me"	Paper Planes & Hurricanes
2016	Dan Henig	"Paper Plane"	Paper Planes & Hurricanes
2016	Krewella	"Team"	New World EP Pt. 1
2017	Krewella	"TH2C"	New World EP Pt. 1
2017	Krewella	"Parachute"	New World EP Pt. 1
2017	Lauren Duski	"Deja Vu" (#43 Billboard Hot 100)	Deja Vu (Single)
2017	Chelsea Cutler	"You Make Me"	You Make Me (Single)
2017	Krewella & Yellow Claw ft. Taylor Bennett	"New World"	New World (Single)
2017	Grace VanderWaal	"Insane Sometimes"	Just the Beginning
2018	Krewella	"Alibi"	Alibi (Single)
2018	Krewella	"Runaway"	Runaway (Single)
2018	ZHU feat. Chris Lee	"Privacy"	Privacy (Single)
2018	Jauz & Krewella	"Soldier"	The Wise & The Wicked
2018	Shaylen	"El Dorado"	El Dorado (Single)
2018	Thutmose feat. Desiigner	"OkOk"	OkOk (Single)
2018	KEY feat. Crush	"One of Those Nights"	FACE – The 1st Album
2018	Austin Brown	"In Betweenin'"	In Betweenin' (Single)
2018	Star	"Don't You Look At Me"	Don't You Look At Me (Single)
2019	Krewella	"Ghost"	zer0
2019	Krewella & Nucleya	"Good On You"	zer0
2019	Monsta X feat. French Montana	"Who Do U Love"	Who Do U Love (Single)
2019	Steve Aoki & Backstreet Boys	"Let It Be Me"	Let It Be Me (Single)
2019	ITZY	"CHERRY"	IT'z ICY
2019	Royal & the Serpent	"Weddings & Funerals"	Weddings & Funerals (Single)
2020	Noah Cyrus	"Liar"	THE END OF EVERYTHING
2020	G-Eazy feat. Goody Grace	"Years To Go"	The Beautiful & Damned
2020	Chelsea Collins feat. 24kGoldn	"Water Run Dry"	Water Run Dry (Single)
2020	Steve Aoki feat. Desiigner & AGNEZ MO	"GIRL"	Neon Future IV
2020	Conor Matthews	"Anyone's But Mine"	Balloons
2020	Conor Matthews	"Drunk"	Heartbreak in the Hills
2020	Conor Matthews	"Loves Me Lonely"	fool's elegy
2020	Colton Dixon	"Not Goodbye"	Colton Dixon
2020	Noah Cunane	"Call Him"	Call Him (Single)
2020	John K	"Learning How To Love"	love + everything else
2020	John K	"Days Like This"	love + everything else
2021	ZAYN	"Unfuckwitable"	Nobody Is Listening
2021	CL	"My Way"	Alpha
2021	Grentperez	"Cherry Wine"	single
2021	Weird Genius feat. Violette Wautier	"Future Ghost"	single
2021	Jeris Johnson	"Going Ghost"	single
2021	Brynn Elliott	"How Dare You" & "Without You"	Can I Be Real?
2021	DJ D-Sol feat. Ryan Tedder	"Learn To Love Me"	single
2021	Loud Luxury feat. Thutmose	"Red Handed"	single
2021	Naïka	"Sauce"	single
