= Hotel Rock Bottom =

Studio album by Frankie Grande
- Released: June 27, 2025
- Genre: Dance pop
- Length: 40:38
- Label: Casablanca
- Producers: Nico Fabito; Novodor; Prince Fox; Slush Puppy; Blake Straus

Singles from Hotel Rock Bottom
- 1. "Rhythm of Love" Released: March 14, 2025; 2. "Boys" Released: May 16, 2025; 3. "Hotel Rock Bottom" Released: July 11, 2025

Hotel Rock Bottom is the debut studio album by American singer, dancer and actor Frankie Grande. It was released on June 27, 2025, by Casablanca Records. Grande co-wrote all the songs on the album except for the first track, and its production was handled by Prince Fox, and Kate Morgan who served as the album executive producer, and additional producer, respectively. The album spawned three singles: "Rhythm of Love", "Boys", and a remix of "Hotel Rock Bottom" featuring Ariana Grande.

== Background ==
The album is inspired by Grande's journey through sobriety and his quest to find clarity, healing, and joy again, both during and after the process. He revealed that the terrorist attack at his sister Ariana Grande's concert in 2017, his inability to support his family after the events due to his addiction, and the homophobic comments he faced on social media during his appearance on Big Brother in 2014, all contributed to his deeper spiral into addiction, ultimately leading him to hit rock bottom. In an interview with Sabrina Shahryar of Crucial Rhythm, Grande revealed that the hotel is real and located in London, where he made the decision to enter rehab.

"It’s where I locked myself after the One Love Manchester concert. It was definitely one of the darkest and worst moments in my whole life. (...) Hotel Rock Bottom truly is about my rock bottom moment where I made the decision to leave, check out and get sober. So it's a real place."

— Frankie Grande explaining the album title, via Crucial Rhythm

== Promotion and release ==
The album was promoted with the release of Grande's debut single "Rhythm of Love", which came out on March 14.

The album second single "Boys" was released on May 16, alongside the album announcement. An accompanying homoerotic music video was released alongside the song. To promote the song, Grande performed it on The Tonight Show Starring Jimmy Fallon, and on various events during Pride Month, such as the OUTLOUD Music Festival at WeHo Pride, A remix by German DJ Felix Jaehn was released on June 18

In July, Grande announced that the title track would serve as the album third single, and it would be a remix with his sister, Ariana Grande. The song was released on July 11, alongside four new tracks for the album deluxe edition, including collaborations with Big Freedia, Felix Jaehn, and Salina EsTitties, among others.

== Track listing ==
Hotel Rock Bottom track listing
No.	Title	Writer(s)	Producer(s)	Length
1.	"Rhythm of Love"	Alex Chapman; Adam Novodor; Molly Irvine; Neil Ormandy; Sam Lassner	Prince Fox; Novodor; Curtis Douglas^{[v]}	3:06
2.	"Messy"	Frankie Grande; Kate Morgan; Ross Golan; Lassner	Prince Fox; Morgan^{[a]}	2:18
3.	"Sex Shop"	Grande; Morgan; Lassner; Ferras Alqaisi; Bonnie McKee	Prince Fox; Alqaisi^{[a]}; Morgan^{[a]}	1:58
4.	"Hotter Than Hell"	Grande; Morgan; Lassner; Dan Henig; Blake Straus	Prince Fox; Straus; Morgan^{[a]}	3:09
5.	"Let Me Live"	Grande; Morgan; Lassner; McKee	Prince Fox; Morgan^{[a]}; Douglas^{[v]}	3:36
6.	"Hotel Rock Bottom"	Grande; Morgan; Lassner; Malia Civetz	Prince Fox; Morgan^{[a]}; Douglas^{[v]}	3:18
7.	"Cognitive Dissonance"	Grande; Morgan; Lassner; Alqaisi	Prince Fox; Alqaisi^{[a]}; Morgan^{[a]}; Douglas^{[v]}	3:00
8.	"Boys"	Grande; Morgan; Lassner; Gino Borri; Tiffany Gia; Robert Hazard	Prince Fox; Morgan^{[a]}	2:34
9.	"I Feel Like I'm Billy Idol"	Grande; Billy Idol; Tony James	Slush Puppy; Nico Fabito; Morgan^{[a]}	2:33
10.	"Glitter Jesus"	Grande; Slush Puppy	Prince Fox; Slush Puppy	2:06
11.	"My Guy"	Grande; Morgan; Lassner; Alma Goodman	Prince Fox; Morgan^{[a]}	2:01
12.	"Revive"	Grande; Morgan; Lassner; Marcus Lomax	Prince Fox; Morgan^{[a]}	2:41
13.	"Oasis"	Grande; Morgan; Lassner; Alqaisi; McKee	Prince Fox; Alqaisi^{[a]}; Morgan^{[a]}	3:05
14.	"Music or the Noise"	Grande; Morgan; Lassner	Prince Fox; Morgan^{[a]}	2:48
15.	"2U"	Grande; Morgan; Lassner; Borri; Alqaisi	Prince Fox; Alqaisi^{[a]}; Morgan^{[a]}	2:19
Total length:				40:38

Hotel Rock Bottom (Deluxe) bonus tracks
No.	Title	Writer(s)	Producer(s)	Length
16.	"Messy" (featuring Big Freedia)	Grande; Morgan; Lassner; Golan	Prince Fox; Morgan^{[a]}	2:44
17.	"Hotel Rock Bottom" (featuring Ariana Grande)	Grande; Morgan; Lassner; Civetz	Prince Fox; Morgan^{[a]}; Douglas^{[v]}	3:15
18.	"My Guy" (featuring Salina EsTitties)	Grande; Morgan; Lassner; Goodman	Prince Fox; Morgan^{[a]}	2:56
19.	"Rhythm of Love" (Detox Remix)	Chapman; Novodor; Irvine; Ormandy; Lassner	James Dietrichson; Douglas^{[v]}	2:57
20.	"Boys" (Felix Jaehn Remix)	Grande; Morgan; Lassner; Borri; Gia; Hazard	Felix Jaehn; Junkx; Morgan^{[a]}	2:57
Total length:				55:29

=== Notes ===
- ^{^[a]} signifies an additional producer
- ^{^[v]} signifies a vocal producer

== Personnel ==
Credits adapted from Tidal.

- Frankie Grande – lead vocals (all tracks), background vocals (tracks 2, 16)
- Curtis Douglas – mixing (1–18, 20)
- Randy Merrill – mastering (1–18, 20)
- Kate Morgan – background vocals (1–4, 6–8, 11, 13–20)
- Adam Novodor – background vocals (1, 8, 19)
- Molly Irvine – background vocals (1, 19)
- Neil Ormandy – background vocals (1, 19)
- Ferras Alqaisi – background vocals (3, 7, 13, 15)
- Bonnie McKee – background vocals (5, 13)
- Sam Lassner – background vocals (6, 8, 14, 15, 17, 20)
- Malia Civetz – background vocals (6, 17)
- Al Cleveland – drums (6)
- Gino Borri – background vocals (8, 20)
- Tiffany Gia – background vocals (8, 20)
- James Dietrichson – mixing, mastering (19)
- Augusto Sanchez – immersive mixing (19)
- Sammy Druker – immersive mixing (19)

== Release history ==
Release dates and formats for Hotel Rock Bottom
Region	Date	Format	Label	Version	Ref.
Various	June 27, 2025	Digital download; streaming; vinyl	Casablanca Records	Standard	
Various	July 11, 2025	Digital download; streaming	Casablanca Records	Deluxe	
