= Happiness, Guaranteed. =

2022 album by Mansionair

Studio album by Mansionair
- Released: 29 April 2022
- Recorded: August 2019–October 2021
- Length: 52:10
- Label: Liberation Music

Mansionair chronology
Shadowboxer (2019)	Happiness, Guaranteed. (2022)	The Sahā Sessions (2022)

Singles from Happiness, Guaranteed.
- 1. "Guillotine" Released: 13 November 2020; 2. "More" Released: 26 February 2021; 3. "Don't Wait" Released: 11 June 2021; 4. "Right Into You" Released: 15 October 2021; 5. "Strangers" Released: 19 November 2021; 6. "Next High" Released: 11 March 2022; 7. "Empty Promise" Released: 1 April 2022; 8. "Shallow Water" Released: 15 April 2022

Happiness, Guaranteed. is the second studio album by Australian indie electronic trio, Mansionair. The album was announced in March 2022 and released on 29 April 2022.

Mansionair said, "This album is about wrestling with the idea of happiness. That it is not a destination that we ultimately arrive at. Reframing contentment and learning how to navigate ourselves in a world so geared toward success and arriving." The album was created in two writing trips outside of Sydney, while the second album feature collaborations.

== Reception ==
Christine Sloman from Melodic Mag said "Overall, Happiness, Guaranteed. is a gripping exploration of life's many cycles. It is definitely possible to find happiness, but as much as we would love to keep it forever, it cannot always stay with us. Mansionair have beautifully shown that life is a never-ending adventure, filled with moments that make us appreciate what we have, but also encourage us to go after more. As long as we evolve, the quest for happiness will also evolve, guaranteed."

Steph Wanderling from EDM Identity said "There really is a lot to listen to in the album, more than the beat. The lyrics speak to you on a spiritual level, and we've all been in positions where at least one song can fit the mood. So if you're in the mood for something other than the electronic dance music that is constantly being put out, this is a wonderful change of pace."

== Track listing ==
Happiness, Guaranteed. disc 1 track listing
No.	Title	Writer(s)	Length
1.	"More"	Mansionair	2:39
2.	"Happy Now"	Mansionair, James Terence Canty	3:53
3.	"The Trouble with Us"	Mansionair	3:43
4.	"Mirror Me"	Mansionair, Carl Vine	4:10
5.	"Adeline"	Mansionair	0:55
6.	"Rapture"	Mansionair	3:36
7.	"A Little Lost"	Mansionair	3:22
8.	"Facedown Domino"	Mansionair	4:24
9.	"Shallow Water"	Mansionair	4:41

Happiness, Guaranteed. disc 2 track listing
No.	Title	Writer(s)	Length
1.	"Strangers" (with Dom Dolla)	Mansionair, Kaelyn Behr, Dominic Matheson	3:37
2.	"Empty Promise" (with Vandelux)	Mansionair, Evan James Cameron White	3:51
3.	"Don't Wait" (with Yahtzel)	Mansionair, Max Armata (pka Yahtzel)	3:51
4.	"Next High" (with Kim Tee)	Mansionair, Hayley Briasco, Koby Berman	3:29
5.	"Right into You" (with Clapton and Like Mike)	Mansionair, Claptone, Michael Thivaios	3:13
6.	"Guillotine" (with NoMBe)	Mansionair, Noah McBeth	2:46
