= New World Pt. 1 =

EP by Krewella
- Released: June 8, 2017
- Recorded: 2016–17
- Genre: EDM
- Length: 23:07
- Label: Mixed Kids Records
- Producers: Krewella; Cody Tarpley; Diskord; Jayson Martinovich; Lookas

Krewella chronology
Ammunition (2016)	New World Pt. 1 (2017)	zer0 (2020)

Singles from New World Pt. 1
- 1. "Team" Released: December 9, 2016; 2. "Be There" Released: May 10, 2017; 3. "Love Outta Me" Released: May 31, 2017

New World Pt. 1 is the third extended play by American electronic dance music band Krewella. It was released on June 8, 2017, by Mixed Kids Records, an independent record label founded by Krewella, on streaming and digital download music services. New World Pt. 1 was preceded by the release of three singles, the lead single "Team" was released on December 9, 2016, followed by "Be There" and "Love Outta Me" which were both released in May 2017.

== Commercial performance ==
In the week ending June 17, 2017, New World Pt. 1 reached No. 15 on the Billboard Top Dance/Electronic Albums Chart. Its lead single, "Team", reached No. 26 on the Hot Dance/Electronic Songs Chart in the week ending December 31, 2016.

== Track listing ==
=== New World Pt. 1 ===
No.	Title	Writer(s)	Length
1.	"Calm Down"	Jahan Yousaf; Yasmine Yousaf	3:10
2.	"TH2C"	J. Yousaf; Y. Yousaf	3:11
3.	"Fortune" (featuring Diskord)	J. Yousaf; Y. Yousaf; Diskord	3:09
4.	"Love Outta Me"	J. Yousaf; Y. Yousaf	3:29
5.	"Team"	J. Yousaf; Y. Yousaf; Dan Henig; Cody Tarpley	3:06
6.	"Be There"	J. Yousaf; Y. Yousaf	3:19
7.	"Parachute"	J. Yousaf; Y. Yousaf	3:43

=== Remix EP ===
A remix compilation titled New World Pt 1: The Remixes was released on August 14 2017.

No.	Title	Length
1.	"TH2C (Dyro Remix)"	4:01
2.	"Parachute (Justin Caruso Remix)"	3:32
3.	"Calm Down (Havok Roth Remix)"	3:32
4.	"Be There (Spag Heddy Remix)"	3:45
5.	"Be There (Vice City Remix)"	4:54
6.	"Love Outta Me (Pierce Remix)"	3:42

== New World Pt. 2 & zer0 ==
The second part of the New World EP was expected to be released before the end of 2017, with its lead single "New World" (with Yellow Claw featuring Taylor Bennett) being released on September 18, 2017.

Other singles, such as "Alibi", "Runaway" and "Bad Liar", were released in 2018. In 2019, Krewella announced the upcoming release of their second studio album Zer0 which evolved from the initial Pt.2 EP.

== Charts ==
Chart (2017)	Peak position
US Top Dance Albums (Billboard)	25
