= Just Call =

Just Call may refer to:

- "Just Call", a song by Delta Goodrem from the 2016 album Wings of the Wild
- "Just Call", a song by John Butler Trio from the 2018 album Home
- "Just Call", a 2017 song by Prince Fox featuring Bella Thorne
