= Ammunition (disambiguation) =

Ammunition is the material fired, scattered, dropped, or detonated from any weapon or weapon system.

Ammunition may also refer to:

- Ammunition (Chamillionaire EP), 2012
- Ammunition (Krewella EP), 2016
- "Ammunition" (1994 song), a song by All Good Children, from the album Fetish Fetish (1994)
- "Ammunition" (Switchfoot song), a song by Switchfoot, from the album The Beautiful Letdown (2003)
- "Ammunition", a song by Morrissey, from the album Maladjusted (1997)
