= Mansionair =

Australian indie rock band

- Origin: Sydney, Australia
- Genres: Electronic; alternative; indie
- Years active: 2014–present
- Labels: Glassnote; Liberation Music
- Members: Jack Froggatt; Lachlan Bostock; Alex Nicholls
- Website: mansionair.com

Mansionair is an Australian indie electronic trio formed in 2014. They signed with Glassnote Records in 2015. Their single "Astronaut – Something About Your Love" peaked on the Billboard Rock Airplay charts.

In 2017, their collaboration with Odesza and WYNNE, "Line of Sight", charted on the US Alternative Songs and Dance/Electronic Songs charts. Their first full-length album, Shadowboxer, was released on 1 March 2019.

Mansionair's second studio album, Happiness, Guaranteed., was released on 29 April 2022.

In December 2022, the group released the live EP The Sahā Sessions.

In May 2025, they issued the single "Lose Yourself Again", from their upcoming third studio album.

== Discography ==
=== Studio albums ===
Title	Album details	Peak chart positions
Title	Album details	AUS
Shadowboxer	Released: 1 March 2019; Formats: CD, 2×LP, digital download, streaming; Label: Glassnote, Liberation	37
Happiness, Guaranteed.	Released: 29 April 2022; Formats: CD, 2×LP, digital download, streaming; Label: Liberation	–
Some Kind of Alchemy	Released: 10 October 2025; Formats: CD, digital download, streaming; Label: Mansionaire, Sony	–

=== EPs ===
Title	Details
Hold Me Down	Released: 2014; Formats: 12" LP, CD, digital download, streaming; Label: Goodbye Records
Pick Me Up	Released: 2 October 2015; Formats: CD, digital download, streaming; Label: Glassnote
The Sahā Sessions	Released: 14 December 2022; Formats: Digital download, streaming; Label: Liberation

=== Singles ===
Title	Year	Peak chart positions	Certifications	Album
Title	Year	US Rock Airplay	Certifications	Album
"Hold Me Down"	2014	—		Hold Me Down / Pick Me Up
"Speak Easy"	2015	—		Pick Me Up
"Pick Me Up"	2015	—		Pick Me Up
"Easier"	2016	—	ARIA: Gold	Shadowboxer
"Astronaut (Something About Your Love)"	2017	44	ARIA: Gold	Shadowboxer
"Violet City"	2018	—		Shadowboxer
"Technicolour"	2018	—		Shadowboxer
"Falling"	2018	—		Shadowboxer
"Shadows"	2019	—		Shadowboxer
"We Could Leave"	2019	—		Shadowboxer
"Guillotine" (featuring NoMBe)	2020	—		Happiness, Guaranteed.
"More"	2021	—		Happiness, Guaranteed.
"Don't Wait" (featuring Yahtzel)	2021	—		Happiness, Guaranteed.
"Right Into You" (with Clapton and Like Mike)	2021	—		Happiness, Guaranteed.
"Strangers" (with Dom Dolla)	2021	—		Happiness, Guaranteed.
"Next High" (with Kim Tee)	2022	—		Happiness, Guaranteed.
"Empty Promise" (with Vandelux)	2022	—		Happiness, Guaranteed.
"Shallow Water"	2022	—		Happiness, Guaranteed.
"Lose Yourself Again"	2025	—		Some Kind of Alchemy
"Atlas"	2025	—		Some Kind of Alchemy
"The Way You Move in Me"	2025	—		Some Kind of Alchemy
"Eraser"	2025	—		Some Kind of Alchemy
"—" denotes a recording that did not chart or was not released.

=== As featured artist ===
Title	Year	Peak chart positions		Certifications
Title	Year	US Alt.	US Dance	Certifications
"Line of Sight" (Odesza featuring WYNNE and Mansionair)	2017	23	37	ARIA: Gold
"Wake Up Call" (Manila Killa featuring Mansionair)	2018	—	—	
"twice as tough" (upsidedownhead featuring Mansionair)	2020	–	–	
