= Ammunition (Krewella EP) =

EP by Krewella
- Released: May 20, 2016
- Recorded: 2013–16
- Genre: EDM
- Length: 21:27
- Label: Columbia
- Producers: Diskord; Oliver Lord; Andrew Goldstein; Don Gilmore; Pegboard Nerds; Stephen Swartz

Krewella chronology
Get Wet (2013)	Ammunition (2016)	New World Pt. 1 (2017)

Singles from Ammunition
- 1. "Beggars" Released: April 28, 2016; 2. "Broken Record" Released: May 10, 2016

Ammunition is the second extended play by American electronic dance music band Krewella. It was released on May 20, 2016 by Columbia Records on streaming and digital download music services. Ammunition was preceded by the release of the single "Beggars", on April 28, 2016, shortly followed by the promotional single "Broken Record", which was released on May 10, 2016. It is a six-track extended play, and the duo's first major release since the departure of former member Kris Trindl. It is also their first major release since their debut album Get Wet.

== Background ==
Just over a year after the release of their debut album "Get Wet" in 2013, Kris Trindl publicly announced a lawsuit, suing them $5 million for against Yasmine and Jahan Yousaf claiming they kicked him out of Krewella to gain high profits after he sobered up out of his alcohol addiction. The sisters then followed up with a counter lawsuit which disputed his sobriety and stated that he resigned from the group himself. In August 2015 a settlement was reached, but the verdicts were not released to the public. The situation eventually led to Deadmau5 siding with Kris, causing Krewella to receive a large amount of internet hatred.

The band announced in 2015 that they had been working on a new extended play, intended to be completed in time for a 2016 tour. From that time out prior to the release there were many snippets of upcoming music including the songs "Broken Record", "Helter Skelter", "Beggars" (with Diskord), "Louder Than Bombs", "Friends", "Superstar" (which featured Pegboard Nerds and NGHTMRE) and "Marchin On". Only three of them made the final track listing, with "Superstar" later being released as a non-album single.

Before the liberation of the EP, two songs were released: "Say Goodbye" on November 24, 2014 and "Somewhere to Run" on March 25, 2015 respectively.

== Singles ==
"Beggars" was released as the lead single from the EP on April 28, 2016, which featured electronic duo Diskord. The music video was released on the same day.

=== Promotional singles ===
"Broken Record" was teased before the release of the extended play on May 10, 2016. A music video was later released on June 8, 2016 as a part of their celebrations for the day in which the duo (at the time a trio) abandoned other studies to become full-time musicians.

== Promotion ==
On April 29, 2016 Krewella released a 30-second video of Yasmine rapping to the tune of Kanye West's song "I Love Kanye" stating "F**k tomorrow, we'll show you the new Krewella" prior to the release of the single "Beggars" with Diskord. The music video for the song was released at the same time.

On the last few days before the release, teasers for "Surrender the Throne", "Marching On", "Beggars", "Broken Record", "Ammunition", and "Can't Forget You" were released, with the latter being released one day before Ammunition's release.

Krewella embarked on a headline tour later in 2016, spanning across 16 dates in North America and Canada and featured new music and their entire live band.

== Commercial performance ==
On the week ending June 11, 2016 Ammunition reached no. 2 on the Billboard Top Dance/Electronic Albums chart and sold 3,000 copies in its debut week. Its lead single, Beggars reached No.24 on the top Dance/Electronic Digital Songs chart and No.33 on the Hot Dance/Electronic Song chart.

== Track listing ==
=== Ammunition ===
No.	Title	Writer(s)	Producer(s)	Length
1.	"Beggars" (with Diskord)	Jahan Yousaf; Yasmine Yousaf; Matt Squire; Edward Klosok; James Logan	Diskord	3:48
2.	"Broken Record"	J. Yousaf; Y. Yousaf; Oliver Lord; John Thomas Roach; Klosok; Logan	Diskord; Oliver Lord	3:28
3.	"Marching On"	J. Yousaf; Y. Yousaf; Nick Furlong; Andrew Goldstein	Goldstein	3:59
4.	"Surrender The Throne"	J. Yousaf; Y. Yousaf	Don Gilmore; Pegboard Nerds	3:15
5.	"Ammunition"	J. Yousaf; Y. Yousaf	Goldstein	3:26
6.	"Can't Forget You"	J. Yousaf; Y. Yousaf; Roach	Stephen Swartz	3:31

=== Ammunition: The Remixes ===
A remix compilation was released on September 2 2016.

No.	Title	Length
1.	"Ammunition (Corporate Slackrs Remix)"	3:37
2.	"Ammunition (Snavs Remix)"	3:12
3.	"Marching On (Nitti Gritti Remix)"	4:37
4.	"Can't Forget You (FKYA Remix)"	4:29
5.	"Beggars (ZATOX Remix)"	4:22
6.	"Can't Forget You (3LAU Remix)"	3:24
7.	"Can't Forget You (Kayzo Remix)"	2:28
8.	"Broken Record (Chaz Jackson Remix)"	2:57
9.	"Broken Record (Shady Moves Remix)"	3:20
10.	"Marching On (Twofold Remix)"	3:26
11.	"Marching On (Blasterjaxx Remix)"	4:17
12.	"Can't Forget You (Halogen Remix)"	2:49
13.	"Marching On (Carter Cruise Remix)"	2:48
Total length:		45:00

== Charts ==
Chart (2016)	Peak position
US Top Dance Albums (Billboard)	2
