= Live for the Night =

2013 single by Krewella

Single by Krewella

from the album Get Wet
- Released: July 2, 2013
- Recorded: 2011−2013
- Genre: Electropop; electro house; dubstep; complextro
- Length: 3:26
- Label: Columbia
- Songwriters: Yasmine Yousaf; Jahan Yousaf; Kris Trindl; Jean Paul Makhlouf; Alex Makhlouf; Samuel Frisch; Nicholas Ditri; Daniel Boselovic
- Producer: Cash Cash

Krewella singles chronology
"Alive" (2012)	"Live for the Night" (2013)	"Enjoy the Ride" (2013)

"Live for the Night" is a single by American electronic dance music band Krewella. The song was released on July 2, 2013 for digital download and streaming. It is the fourth single from their debut album Get Wet, the first of which did not appear in one of their previous extended plays Play Hard or Play Harder. The song was written by band members Kris Trindl, Yasmine Yousaf and Jahan Yousaf, along with Nicholas Ditri and Daniel Boselovic, whilst production was handled by the electronic music trio Cash Cash, who also assisted in writing the song. It reached number one on Billboard's Dance Club Songs chart in its October 19, 2013 issue.

== Background ==
Krewella's debut album Get Wet was released on September 20, 2013. It spawned three singles prior to the release of "Live for the Night" these being "Killin' It", "Alive", and "Come & Get It".

== Promotion ==
A set of remixes by Pegboard Nerds, Xilent, Dash Berlin, W&W, Danny Avila & Deniz Koyu was released on November 4, 2013.

== Music video ==
The audio and lyric videos were released on the same day as the single's release, with the audio video being released via Proximity and the lyric video being released via KrewellaMusicVEVO, both on YouTube. The music video was released on August 1, 2013. The music video features Krewella cutting off the power to a town and luring the people to a secret concert at the power plant where they are no longer slaves to the various electronic devices that distract them all day long.

== Live performances ==
Krewella performed "Live For The Night" on Good Morning America as part of their Halloween broadcast on October 31, 2013.

== Charts ==
=== Weekly charts ===
Chart (2013–2014)	Peak position
Canada Hot 100 (Billboard)	96
Japan Hot 100 (Billboard)	10
US Billboard Hot 100	100
US Dance Club Songs (Billboard)	1
US Hot Dance/Electronic Songs (Billboard)	14

=== Year-end charts ===
Chart (2013)	Position
US Dance Club Songs (Billboard)	11
US Hot Dance/Electronic Songs (Billboard)	32

== Release history ==
Release dates and formats for "Live for the Night"
Region	Date	Format	Label(s)	Ref.
United States	July 9, 2013	Mainstream airplay	Columbia	
