= Thutmose (musician) =

- Born: Umar Ibrahim; August 4, 1995 (age 31); Lagos, Nigeria
- Origin: Brooklyn, New York
- Occupations: rapper; singer; songwriter
- Website: thutmosemusic.com

Umar Ibrahim (born August 4, 1995), known better by his stage name Thutmose, is a Nigerian-American rapper, singer, and songwriter based in Brooklyn, New York.

== Early life and education ==
Ibrahim grew up in a small city outside of Lagos, Nigeria. Shortly after the Lagos armoury explosion in 2002, at age 7, Ibrahim and his family moved to New York. Ibrahim went to Alfred State College for a year studying computer science, but dropped out to pursue music full-time.

== Career ==
Thutmose first gained attention in 2017 after releasing a freestyle to the Kendrick Lamar single "Humble".

On October 16, 2017, Thutmose released the single "WuWu" (short for "what's up with you?") through Pigeons and Planes. Speaking about the track, Ibrahim said, "Especially with dark times in the world, I hope this song serves as a reminder that there's still a lot of love in the world."

On April 30, 2018, Thutmose released a track titled "Run Wild" featuring NoMBe. Originally intended for an upcoming debut album, the track was released alongside the trailer for EA Sports' FIFA 18 as its theme music. This was followed by the collaborative EP Run Wild released on August 8, 2018.

Thutmose released his debut solo mixtape Man on Fire on October 24, 2018.

Thutmose was included in the soundtrack album Spider-Man: Into the Spider-Verse, released on December 14, 2018, for the 2018 animated film of the same name.

On November 10, 2019, Thutmose was part of the song "Giants" by virtual hip-hop group True Damage, created to promote League of Legends. The group debuted during the 2019 League of Legends World Championship. The rapper plays Ekko, a playable character in League of Legends. The group also includes Keke Palmer, Soyeon, Becky G and Duckwrth.

On December 12, 2020, Thutmose was part of the song "Run It" with Cal Scruby.

On January 8, 2021, a collaboration between Thutmose, American DJ Steve Aoki and South Korean band A.C.E, titled "Fav Boyz", was released.

== Discography ==
=== Mixtapes ===
List of mixtapes, with release date and label shown
| Title | Details |
|---|---|
| Man on Fire | Released: October 24, 2018; Label: TH3RD BRAIN; Formats: Digital download, streaming |

=== EPs ===
List of extended plays, with release date and label shown
| Title | Details |
|---|---|
| Run Wild (with NoMBe) | Released: August 8, 2018; Label: TH3RD BRAIN; Formats: Digital download, streaming |
| Don't Wake Me EP | Released: November 5, 2019; Label: King Thut LLC/EMPIRE; Format: Digital download, streaming |
| Best of Both Worlds: Side A | Released: September 30, 2020; Label: King Thut LLC/EMPIRE; Format: Digital download, streaming |
| Best of Both Worlds: Side B | Released January 29, 2021; Label: King Thut LLC/EMPIRE; Formats: Digital download, streaming |

=== Singles ===
| Title | Year | Album |
|---|---|---|
| "Red Handed" (with Loud Luxury) | 2021 | Holiday Hits |
