= NoMBe =

German-American musician (born 1991)

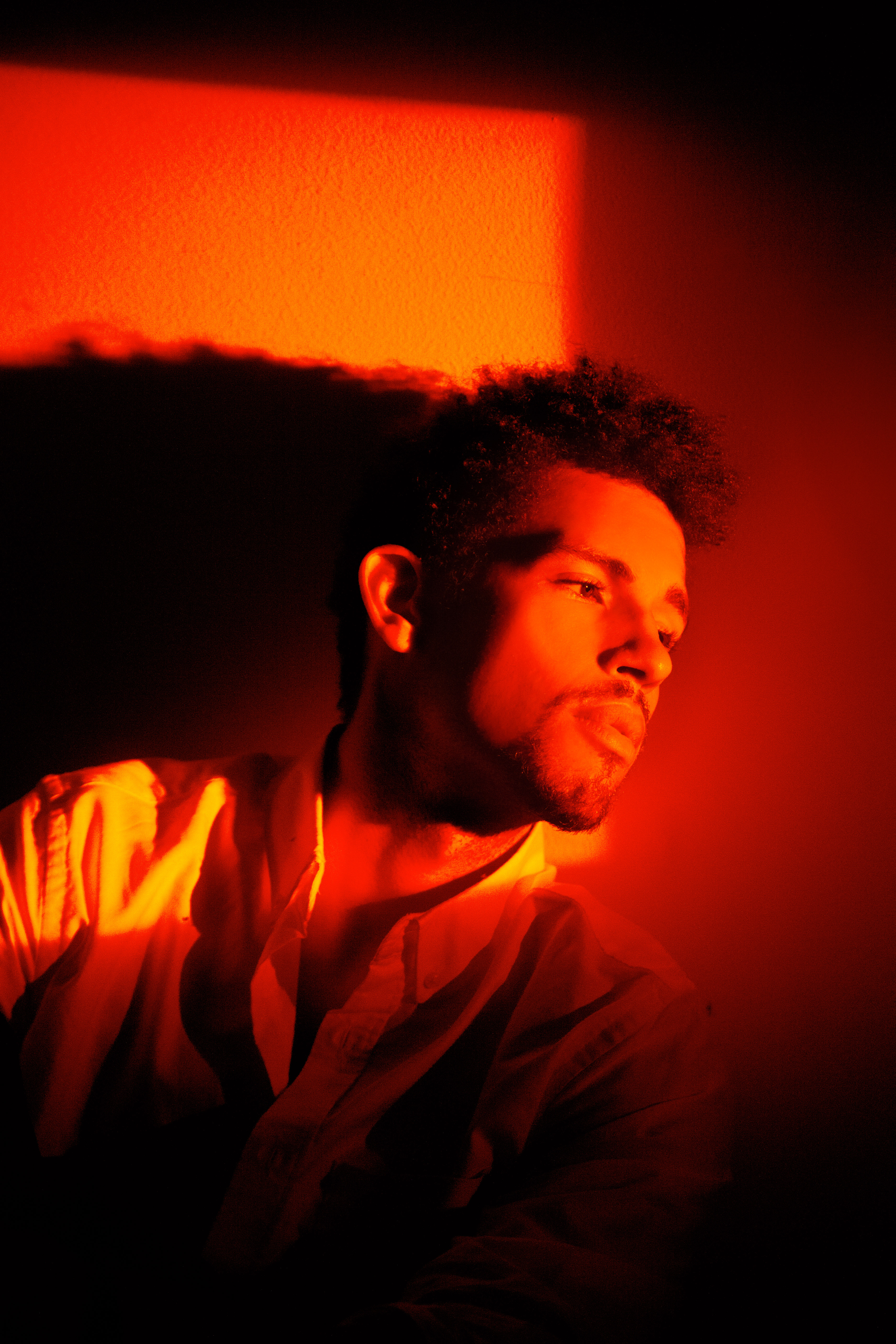
- NoMBe photographed by Lissy Elle Laricchia

Background information
- Born: April 27, 1991 (age 35); Heidelberg, Germany
- Origin: Los Angeles, California, US
- Genres: Soul; alternative; chillwave; psychedelia; R&B
- Instruments: guitar, piano, drums, bass, synthesizer, sampler
- Years active: 2012–present
- Labels: TH3RD BRAIN, Interscope, Republic Records, Virgin Records
- Website: nombemusic.com

Noah McBeth (born April 27, 1991), better known by his stage name NoMBe, is a German-American recording artist, multi-instrumentalist, composer and record producer. NoMBe refers to his music as "Electric Soul", combining elements of Indie, Chillwave and modern day Soul music. He holds both German and United States citizenship while splitting his time between Los Angeles and Hawaii.

== Life and career ==
Noah was born and raised in Heidelberg, Germany. He is the son of former fashion model and author Mary McBeth and former music manager Christoph Mittmann. He is of Trinidadian, African-American and native Blackfoot on his mother’s side and German-French on his father's. He was primarily raised by his paternal grandparents and began studying classical piano under Russian concert pianist Tatjana Worm at a young age. After graduating high school in 2010, he left Germany to study music in New York City and Miami, eventually settling in Los Angeles. He is the godson of soul singer Chaka Khan.

Before adopting the NoMBe moniker, McBeth produced music under the name Rookie (The Cook). By December 2010, his track "L'Ange Dans Le Ciel" had appeared on Bob42jh's One Moment in Time compilation. The track was subsequently included on Bob42jh's Flowers for Jun, a Nujabes tribute compilation published in February 2011. Later that year, Rookie's track "Azure" appeared on the first Friends and Family compilation from Cult Classic Records, a label launched by Bob42jh and Thomas Prime.

In February 2018, it was announced that NoMBe was selected to Sirius XM's Alt Nation's Advanced Placement Tour, along with Mikky Ekko and Mansionair, which ran from April to May 2018 in eighteen North American cities.

NoMBe released his 18-track debut album They Might’ve Even Loved Me, in March 2018 under TH3RD BRAIN Records. The album earned praise from NPR, Billboard, Afropunk, WWD, Complex, and Flaunt Magazine. Ones to Watch referred to it as "one of the best albums of 2018", while Atwood Magazine rated it a perfect 10 out of 10. His song "Wait" premiered worldwide on the popular Australian radio station Triple J. Multiple songs gained airplay around the world, including "Man Up", "Wait", "Freak Like Me", "Drama", and "Milk & Coffee".

A year later, NoMBe re-wrote, re-tracked, and re-produced They Might’ve Even Loved Me, releasing They Might’ve Even Loved Me (Re:Imagination).

In July, NoMBe released an EP with fellow TH3RD BRAIN musician Thutmose. The two previously collaborated to create the 2018 EP Run Wild. The title track was selected as EA Sports FIFA 18's official "World Cup" commercial track.

Rolling Stone Australia dedicated a 2020 article to him and his song “Weirdo”.

In 2020, his US tour was canceled due to concerns over COVID-19. Despite this, he used the time to creatively realign himself. During 2020, he rented an animal farm in Sunland, California, where he recorded his second album Chromatopia (stylized in all caps), released in 2021. The album garnered acclaim from PAPER magazine, American Songwriter, and Ones to Watch.

As of August 2023, NoMBe's releases have surpassed a combined 600 million streams across streaming platforms.

== Influences ==
In an interview with Billboard magazine, NoMBe cited Daft Punk and Gorillaz as major influences on his approach to music production. He has also mentioned a wide variety of influences including Red Hot Chili Peppers, Henri Mancini, Bill Withers, N.E.R.D., Stevie Wonder, RJD2, Bonobo, Marvin Gaye, MGMT, Al Green, the Beatles, Radiohead, Toro y Moi, Unknown Mortal Orchestra, Nile Rodgers, Pete Rock, Quantic, Tame Impala & George Clinton.

== Personal life ==
In July 2020, shortly after the murder of George Floyd by former police officer Derek Chauvin, McBeth was involved in sheltering a group of young protesters after police had opened fire using rubber bullets and teargas at a nearby Hollywood intersection. NoMBe, who had been held at gunpoint by police days prior, allowed the protestors to utilize his studio and spend the night. The resulting investigation by the West Hollywood Police Department prompted an eviction from his commercial music studio.

In early 2021, NoMBe moved to Hawaii, where he operates a recording studio music studio.

In 2022 he dated actress Sulem Calderon.

== Reception and use in popular culture ==
Elton John featured him in Rocket Hour, and Pharrell Williams championed him on OTHERTONE and selected “Can’t Catch Me” as the theme for his HBO documentary series Outpost. In April 2018, NoMBe released “Can’t Catch Me”, which was selected to be the theme for Pharrell Williams' HBO docuseries Outpost. NoMBe has had multiple songs featured in the TV series Ballers. Other songs followed on Shameless, Ozark, The Mighty Ducks: Game Changers, Marvel’s Cloak & Dagger, The Resident, Ballers, and in Kylie Jenner’s Life of Kylie.

== Awards and nominations ==
=== Berlin Music Video Awards ===
The Berlin Music Video Awards is an international festival that promotes the art of music videos.

Year	Nominated work	Award	Result	Ref.
2025	"Pleasure Chasers"	Best Cinematography	Nominated	
2026	"Ipanema (Cafuné)"	Best Song	Nominated	
