= Shadowboxer (album) =

2019 album by Mansionair

Studio album by Mansionair
- Released: 1 March 2019
- Recorded: August 2015–August 2018
- Studio: Squirrel Dr, Twin Peaks, Hercules Street Studios, Stanley's Room, Forbes Street Studios, Studios 301
- Label: Glassnote, Liberation

Mansionair chronology
Pick Me Up (2015)	Shadowboxer (2019)	Happiness, Guaranteed. (2022)

Singles from Shadowboxer
- 1. "Easier" Released: 11 November 2016; 2. "Astronaut (Something About Your Love)" Released: 27 October 2017; 3. "Violet City" Released: 4 May 2018; 4. "Technicolour" Released: 6 July 2018; 5. "Falling" Released: 14 September 2018; 6. "Shadows" Released: 25 January 2018; 7. "We Could Leave" Released: 15 February 2019

Shadowboxer is the debut studio album by Australian indie electronic trio, Mansionair. The album was released on 1 March 2019 and debuted and peaked at number 37 on the ARIA Chart.

The group recorded and produced the album over three year and in between touring. Prior to release, Mansionair said Shadowboxer is "a record about deciding to lift our gaze from the darkness and acknowledge the light that shapes us. It bookends our first years of discovering who we are and what we wanted Mansionair to be, as we pushed through insecurities, uncertainties and moments of relief. It's as much a diary of our first three years working together as friends as it is about making every mistake possible together."

== Reception ==
Cyclone Wehner from The Music said "Shadowboxer chronicles Mansionair bonding, surmounting self-doubt, and achieving life balance. But, in fact, the musicians explore relatable matters of psychic wellbeing, coming of age, and personal epiphany."

Al Newstead from Triple J said "At 16 tracks, it's clear the band struggled to balance four years' worth of old and new, but the 'more is more' approach has somewhat diluted the key theme of the record." Newstead concluding with saying, "Shadowboxer punches above its weight and is the work of a group who may yet deliver a total knock out in their career."

Malvika Padin from Clash Music said "Sleek electro-pop that sonically tells the story of love – love found, and love lost – is the best way to describe indie-pop trio Mansionair's debut album Shadowboxer".

Athena Kam from When the Horn Blows said "Whilst some other bands use their debut album to find a sound they can hone[sic] in on in subsequent albums, Mansionair are clearly already comfortable in their shoes as they release a well-crafted debut that leaves no question about what the band are doing with their music and who they are. It is clear that every note, every beat, and every word has been thought out to accurately reflect the journey of the band thus far, as they grapple with the problems thrown up by life.”"

== Track listing ==
Shadowboxer track listing
No.	Title	Writer(s)	Length
1.	"Est"	Mansionair	0:13
2.	"Alibi"	Mansionair	3:39
3.	"Easier"	Mansionair	4:33
4.	"Technicolour"	Mansionair, Dann Hume	3:20
5.	"Heartbeat"	Mansionair	2:40
6.	"Astronaut (Something About Your Love)"	Mansionair	3:23
7.	"Violet City"	Mansionair, Jakob Erixson, Michael Poleman, Red One, Batzorig Vaanchig	3:34
8.	"We Could Leave"	Mansionair	4:26
9.	"Shadows"	Mansionair, Hume	3:30
10.	"Waiting Room"	Mansionair, Hume	3:10
11.	"Falling"	Mansionair, Alexander Burnett, Hume	3:23
12.	"Sierra (interlude)"	Mansionair	1:22
13.	"Harlem"	Mansionair	3:47
14.	"Best Behaviour"	Mansionair	4:30
15.	"I Won’t Take No for an Answer"	Mansionair	2:11
16.	"Heriloom"	Mansionair, Matt Hales	4:33

== Charts ==
Weekly chart performance for Shadowboxer
Chart (2019)	Peak position
Australian Albums (ARIA)	37
