= The Body Never Lies =

Studio album by Krewella
- Released: March 4, 2022
- Genres: Electronic music, EDM, trap, drum and bass, house, future bass, trance
- Length: 36:41
- Label: Mixed Kids Records

Krewella chronology
zer0 (2020)	The Body Never Lies (2022)	PEAK (2026)

Singles from The Body Never Lies
- 1. "Never Been Hurt" Released: November 19, 2021; 2. "No Control" Released: December 17, 2021; 3. "I'm Just A Monster Underneath, My Darling" Released: January 28, 2022

The Body Never Lies is the third studio album by American electronic dance music duo Krewella. It was released on March 4, 2022, on Krewella's independent label Mixed Kids Records. Three singles were released from the album: "Never Been Hurt" (with BEAUZ), "No Control" (with MADGRRL), and "I'm Just a Monster Underneath, My Darling".

== Background ==
The first single of the album, "Never Been Hurt" in collaboration with BEAUZ, was released on 19 November 2021, alongside a music video. The second single "No Control" was released in collaboration with MADGRRL on 17 December 2021.

The third single, "I'm Just a Monster Underneath, My Darling" was released on 28 January 2022, alongside a lyric video. When discussing the song, Krewella stated it's "a story told from dual perspectives: both the victim and antagonist, the predator and prey." With this release, they announced their third studio album "The Body Never Lies", which released on March 4, 2022. The album cover, alongside the single covers and lyric videos for "No Control" and "I'm Just a Monster Underneath, My Darling", were created by American designer Olivia Van Rye. A music video for "Drive Away" was released alongside the album.

The album title "The Body Never Lies" appears as lyrics in two tracks on the album. In an interview with We Rave You, they stated the line is about "feeling, remembering, and being in our distinct vessels that encapsulate our soul and memories", and that it had been inspired by an exert from Jahan's notebook. They also discussed the experience of writing the album primarily during lock-downs of the COVID-19 pandemic.

Krewella embarked on a headline tour featuring 23 dates across the United States, commencing on April 1. They also played at several major music festivals in the wake of the album, including Ultra Music Festival and Tomorrowland. Following the conclusion of the tour, Krewella went on an indefinite hiatus, eventually returning to releasing music in June 2025 with "Crying On The Dancefloor".

== Track listing ==
All tracks written and produced by Jahan Yousaf and Yasmine Yousaf. All songs mixed by Prince Fox with the exception of Never Been Hurt and No Control.

No.	Title	Writer(s)	Producer(s)	Length
1.	"ashes to ashes, dust to dust (Intro)"			1:44
2.	"Traces"			3:46
3.	"No Control" (with MADGRRL)	Sabrina Santiago	Sabrina Santiago	2:43
4.	"In The Water"	Cody Tarpley		4:02
5.	"War Forever"	Cody Tarpley; Rachel Kanner		4:37
6.	"You Don't Even Have To Try"	Cody Tarpley; Sam Lessner		4:33
7.	"Never Been Hurt" (with BEAUZ)	Bernie Yang; Johan Yang; Viktoria Hansen	Bernie Yang; Johan Yang	3:15
8.	"Drive Away"	Sam Lassner; Akil King; Vincent van den Ende	Sam Lassner; Vincent van den Ende	4:00
9.	"6 Feet"			3:48
10.	"I'm Just A Monster Underneath, My Darling"			4:10

== Charts ==
=== Singles ===
Title	Year	Peak chart positions
Title	Year	US Dance
"Drive Away"	2022	48
