= Frankie Grande =

American actor, singer and dancer (born 1983)

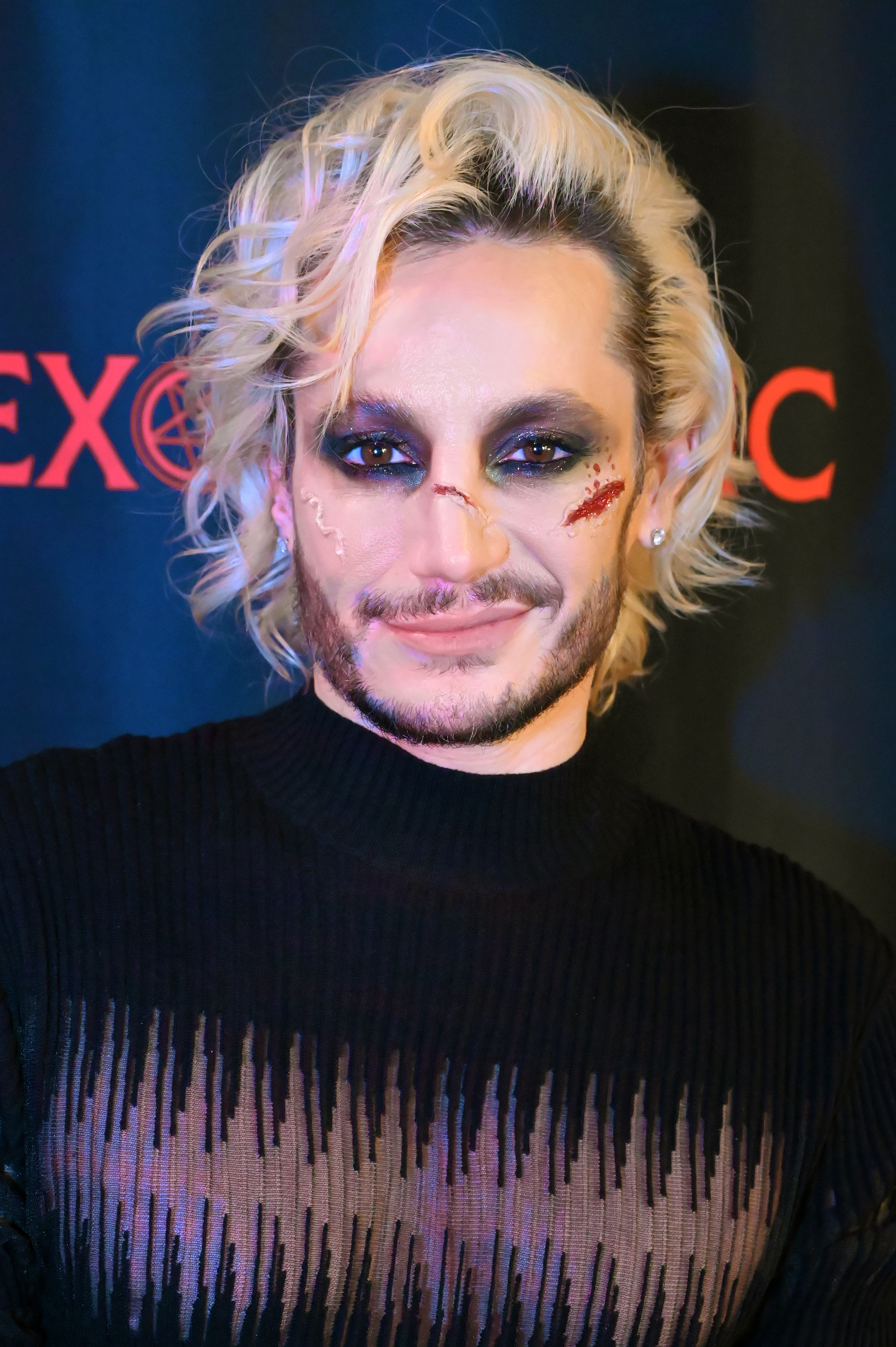
- Grande at Exorcistic Opening Night, 2025
- Born: Frank James Michael Grande Marchione; January 24, 1983 (age 43); New York City, U.S.
- Education: Muhlenberg College
- Occupations: Actor; singer; dancer
- Years active: 2007–present
- Spouse: Hale Leon (m. 2022)
- Relatives: Ariana Grande (half-sister)
- Website: https://frankiegrande.com/

Frank James Michael Grande Marchione (born January 24, 1983) is an American actor, singer and dancer. He has performed on Broadway as Franz in the musical Rock of Ages (2014–2015) and as Victor Garber in Titanique (2026); he also appeared in Mamma Mia! from 2007 to 2010 and has played roles Off-Broadway, in regional theatre productions and on tour. He has produced Broadway shows and both produced and appeared in cabaret acts, including his own one-man show. He has played the villain Frankini recurrently, since 2017, in several TV comedy series, including Henry Danger and Danger Force, and in Henry Danger: The Movie.

In 2014, he was a contestant on the American reality television series Big Brother 16, and in 2023, he was a contestant on Big Brother: Reindeer Games. Grande was a judge on the 2015 season of America's Best Dance Crew. From 2016 to 2017, he co-hosted Style Code Live, a live Amazon fashion and shopping show that streamed on weeknights, from which he took off time to compete on the British reality show Celebrity Big Brother 18 in mid-2016. His philanthropic work includes co-founding the non-profit arts organization "Broadway in South Africa" and work for buildOn. He is the older half-brother of Ariana Grande.

== Life and career ==
=== Early years and producing ===
Frankie Grande was born in New York City, the son of Victor Marchione, a physician, and Joan Grande, chief executive officer of telephone and alarm system company Hose-McCann Communications. He grew up in Englewood, New Jersey, and moved with his mother to Boca Raton, Florida, at age 10, where he later attended Pine Crest School. He began performing in musicals in the fifth grade. His maternal half-sister is singer and actress Ariana Grande, and he has a paternal half-brother, James Marchione. He graduated from Muhlenberg College in Pennsylvania in 2005, having triple-majored in biology, theatre and dance. He considered medical school but decided to take a year off to pursue theatre.

Grande began his professional performing career by 2007, when he appeared as Boots the Monkey in a national tour of Dora the Explorer Live! (Dora's Pirate Adventure) and in regional theatre productions, including the title role in George M!, Mike Costa in A Chorus Line and Lewis in Pippin, among others. Later in 2007, he joined the Broadway cast of the musical Mamma Mia!, in the ensemble and as understudy for Eddie, in which he performed for three years.

Grande produced shows on and off Broadway, including Broadway productions of Hamlet (2009) starring Jude Law and revivals of La Bête (2010–2011) starring David Hyde Pierce and Born Yesterday (2011) starring Jim Belushi. He also produced Brooke Shields' one-woman cabaret show in 2011. Grande has performed in cabaret acts in New York City, including at Birdland Jazz Club and 54 Below. Grande was named "Mr. Broadway" in the "Mr. Broadway 2007" charity benefit. In 2013, he starred as Bobby in a summer theatre production of the musical Crazy for You. He also presented his own show in New York, Livin' la Vida Grande, at the Laurie Beechman Theatre.

=== 2014–2016 ===
In February 2014, Grande played Consuela Off-Broadway in a revival of the musical Pageant. In June of that year, he performed at DigiFest NYC. In mid-2014, Grande appeared on the American reality television series Big Brother 16. MTV called his 12 weeks on the show "controversial ... peppered with some powerful, outrageous, and downright impressive moments". Grande placed 5th out of 16 contestants.

Grande returned to Broadway in November 2014 as Franz in the musical Rock of Ages for a two-month engagement. He appeared on Good Day New York and performed "Hit Me With Your Best Shot". The same month, he co-hosted the red carpet pre-show of the American Music Awards. In 2014, TV Guide called Grande one of "Our Favorite YouTube Stars". He was featured in a 2014 ABC Nightline segment about entertainers who use social media to boost their success. Writing in The New York Times in 2014, Michael Musto termed Grande "friskily ambitious". Another reporter called him "unabashedly enthusiastic about life."

In 2015, Billboard included Grande in its list of "32 of the top social media stars on the Internet today." In January 2015, Grande again performed his one-man cabaret show at 54 Below. In February, he appeared in a music video for Lance Bass and modeled for Malan Breton at New York Fashion Week. In March, Grande was an Entertainment Tonight interviewer at the 2015 Kids' Choice Awards. He also appeared in the documentary short film, "Malan Breton: A Journey to Taiwan", which won the 2015 New York City International Film Festival award for "Best Short Documentary". In June he appeared at DigiFest NYC, and the following month he served as a judge for the #JoeyShine Video Contest. Grande was a judge on the 2015 reality TV series America's Best Dance Crew All-Stars: Road to the VMAs, on MTV in 2015. He hosted a TV special on the Oxygen channel in August 2015 called Worst.Post.Ever: With Frankie Grande about social media faux pas. The following month, he made a guest appearance on Big Brother 17. He co-hosted the red-carpet pre-show of the American Music Awards again in 2015. Throughout the year, he also regularly performed a number in his sister's The Honeymoon Tour. Grande was nominated for a 2016 People's Choice Award.

Grande revived his autobiographical one-man show, Livin' La Vida Grande, in Los Angeles in January 2016. The same month, he and his sister launched a unisex fragrance named "Frankie by Ariana Grande". Beginning March 2016, Grande co-hosted Amazon.com's live show, Style Code Live (SCL), which covers celebrity trends as well as fashion and beauty news and tips. The show allows viewers to shop for the items discussed and to ask questions interactively. It streams live each weeknight. A review in The Washington Post called the show "something of a mash-up between QVC and E! News". Grande performed his cabaret act, Livin' la Vida Grande, at The Box in New York City over a weekend in June 2016. He was also a guest panelist on Logo TV's Gay for Play Game Show Starring RuPaul in a 2016 episode. In July and August, Grande appeared on the British reality TV show Celebrity Big Brother 18, finishing in 6th place. He recorded a segment on fashions in the Celebrity Big Brother house for SCL, and returned to co-hosting SCL full-time in September 2016 Grande continued to host SCL until May 2017.

=== 2017–2023 ===
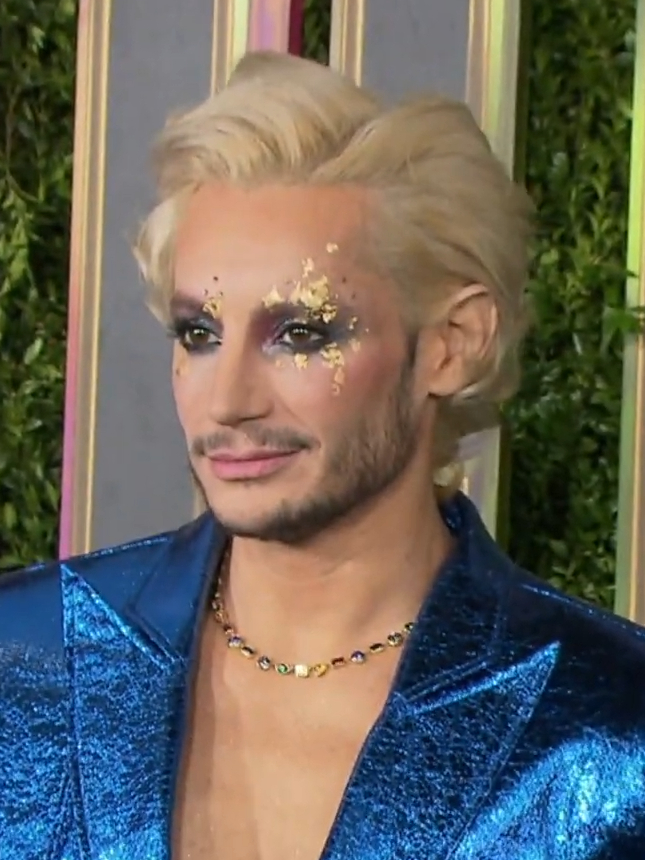
Grande in 2024

Together with Olivia Culpo, he critiqued the 2017 Golden Globes fashions on The Today Show. Grande modeled for Propaganda by Richie Rich, and again for Breton, at Madison Square Garden during New York Fashion Week in February 2017. In May 2017, he released a music single, "Queen", and an accompanying music video, about his inspiration by '70s glam rock icons. He launched an app partnership, YouCam Make-up, in June, which ties in to the single. "Queen" ranked number 35 on the Billboard Twitter Top Tracks chart for the week dated July 15, 2017. In July, Grande competed on the CBS TV game show Candy Crush. The following month, he appeared on the Vimeo web series Indoor Boys; for this he was nominated for a Best Actor award at the 2018 Indie Series Awards. He guest-starred in September 2017 in a two-part episode of Nickelodeon's sitcom Henry Danger, Season 3, "Live & Dangerous", in the role of Frankini. In October 2017 Grande appeared in the season 2 finale of the Netflix television series Haters Back Off as a fictionalized version of himself. In December, he appeared on Trivial Takedown on Fuse TV.

In January 2018, Grande starred in The Unauthorized Musical Parody of: Rocky at Rockwell Table and Stage in Los Angeles. The following month, he hosted the red carpet and performed at the Make-Up Artists and Hairstylists Guild Awards in Los Angeles. Grande played Frank-n-Furter in The Rocky Horror Show in Los Angeles and then joined the cast of the off-Broadway show Cruel Intentions: The Musical at (Le) Poisson Rouge as Blaine in March 2018. In May 2018, Grande reprised the role of Frankini in a fourth season episode of Henry Danger titled "Captain Man-kini", and also guest-starred on RuPaul's Drag Race. In July he returned for another guest appearance on Indoor Boys. He starred as Finch in a July 2018 Muhlenberg production of How to Succeed in Business Without Really Trying. A reviewer wrote: "His Finch is utterly charming and has an adorable innocence that belies the manipulative techniques he employs to get ahead." In August, he played Captain Victor Garber in New York City in a parody jukebox musical, based on the music of Céline Dion, called Titanique. He also appeared in the show's return engagement later in the year. He continued to perform in Titanique in pop-up concert engagements in Los Angeles and New York during the COVID-19 pandemic and in a live version of the show carried on the streaming platform Stellar on May 2, 2021.

Grande also continued to perform his one-man show at nightclubs. He returned as Frankini for a musical episode of Henry Danger in July 2019 titled "Henry Danger: The Musical", in which he places a curse on Swellview that forces everyone to sing instead of speak. He reprised his role of Franz in a Los Angeles production of Rock of Ages in late 2019. Grande played the role of Richard in the 2020 film Spree He starred in the 2021 Macy Gray video of "Undone". and played Frankini in several episodes of Danger Force from 2020 to 2022. Since 2021, together with Hector Navarro, he has been hosting the Nickelodeon podcast SpongeBob BingePants. Around Halloween in 2021 and 2022, he played the Nerd in Horror Camp: A Musical Massacre at the Bourbon Room in Los Angeles. In April 2022, Grande reprised the role of Frankini in a crossover episode of Side Hustle, and from June to September, he reprised the role of Victor Garber in an off-Broadway engagement of Titanique at The Asylum Theatre. In 2023, Grande played Nico in the film Summoning Sylvia. He returned to Big Brother later in the year to compete in the holiday spin-off season Big Brother: Reindeer Games. He reached the finale and finished in 3rd place.

=== 2024–present ===
In 2024, Grande returned to Titanique and later in the year reprised the role of Frank-N-Furter in The Rocky Horror Show at the Bucks County Playhouse in Pennsylvania. He appeared as Frankini in the 2025 film Henry Danger: The Movie. On June 27, 2025, Grande released his debut studio album, Hotel Rock Bottom, for which he co-wrote 14 of the 15 songs. He appeared on The Tonight Show Starring Jimmy Fallon to perform songs from the album. He returned for a third consecutive year as Frank-N-Furter in The Rocky Horror Show in October 2025 at the Bucks County Playhouse in Pennsylvania.

After undergoing spinal surgery in December 2025 to relieve pain and neurological symptoms, Grande is reprising the role of Victor Garber in the Broadway production of Titanique, beginning in March 2026.

As of 2024, Grande's social media presence included more than 400,000 YouTube subscribers and more than 2 million followers on Instagram. He also works with his mother, Joan Grande, for Diamond Dog Entertainment, a production company.

== Philanthropy ==
In 2007, Grande co-founded the non-profit arts organization "Broadway in South Africa", traveling to South Africa to teach performance arts to disadvantaged youth for seven years, before the charity merged with buildOn. In 2013, Grande helped buildOn to build a school in a rural village in Malawi, in southeastern Africa. In 2014, buildOn honored him for his efforts with its Global Impact Award. Grande is an anti-smoking advocate. Grande donated the money that he won on Big Brother 16 (from the "Team America" twist he was a part of) to buildOn, to build another school in Africa. In January 2015, he returned to Malawi to help begin construction of the school, named in memory of his grandfather. Grande raised additional money for buildOn, to fund the school, eventually surpassing his goal of $70,000. Grande participated in a 2016 fire prevention public service announcement called 2steps2minutes and the annual Broadway Bares show to benefit Broadway Cares/Equity Fights AIDS.

In June 2018, Grande headlined the annual "Broadway Sings for Pride" benefit concert at The Cutting Room in New York. He is also an active participant in AIDS/LifeCycle, an annual event that raises money to fight HIV/AIDS. He raised over $38,000 in 2018. Grande also rode in the event in June 2019. he is a member of the GLAAD Board of Directors.

== Personal life ==
Grande is openly gay. On May 4, 2022, he married Hale Leon, an actor and model whom he had been dating since 2019. In 2023, Grande obtained Italian citizenship.

== Discography ==
Studio albums

- Hotel Rock Bottom (2025)

== Filmography ==
=== Films ===
Year	Title	Role	Notes
2015	Malan Breton a Journey to Taiwan	Himself	Documentary
2020	Spree	Richard	
2023	Summoning Sylvia	Nico	

=== Television ===
Year	Title	Role	Notes
2013	The Real Housewives of Miami	Himself – Guest	Season 3, Episode 12
2014	Big Brother 16	Himself – HouseGuest	Finished 5th out of 16.
2014	American Music Awards	Himself	
2015	2015 Kids' Choice Awards	Himself – Interviewer for ET	
2015	Good Morning America	Himself – Guest	Episode: August 17, 2015
2015	America's Best Dance Crew season 8	Himself – Judge	
2015	Worst.Post.Ever: With Frankie Grande (Oxygen)	Host	
2015	American Music Awards of 2015	Himself	
2016	Celebrity Big Brother 18	Himself – Housemate	Finished 6th out of 15.
2016–2017	Style Code Live	Himself – Co-host	Daily episodes
2016–2017	Gay for Play Game Show Starring RuPaul	Himself – Panelist	Guest star
2017	Candy Crush	Himself – Competitor	Guest star
2017	Haters Back Off	Himself – Guest star	Season 2, episode 8
2017–2019	Henry Danger	Frankini	Guest star – 4 episodes
2018	The Adventures of Kid Danger	Frankini (voice)	Episode: "Magical Beefery Tour"
2018–2023	RuPaul's Drag Race	Himself – Guest star	2 episodes
2019	E! True Hollywood Story	Himself	Episode: "Is Fame an Addiction?"
2020	Unfiltered	Himself	Episode: "Burgers in Your Laundry!"
2020–2022	Danger Force	Frankini	6 episodes
2022	Side Hustle	Frankini	Episode: "When Worlds Collide"
2023	Big Brother 25	Himself	Guest appearances – 3 episodes
2023	Big Brother: Reindeer Games	Himself – HouseGuest	Finished 3rd out of 9.
2024	Ghosting with Luke Hutchie and Matthew Finlan	Himself	
2025	Henry Danger: The Movie	Frankini	Television film
2026	The Comeback	Finance Dudes A.D.	Episode: "Valerie Chases the Truth"

== Stage credits ==
Year	Title	Role	Venue	Ref.
2001	Mamma Mia!	Ensemble	Broadway, Broadhurst Theatre	
2014	Rock of Ages	Franz Klineman	Broadway, Brooks Atkinson Theatre	
2019	Rock of Ages	Franz Klineman	Los Angeles, The Bourbon Room	
2022	Titanique	Victor Garber, Luigi	Off-Broadway, Daryl Roth Theatre	
2026	Titanique	Victor Garber, Luigi	Broadway, St. James Theatre	
