= Enjoy the Ride (Krewella song) =

Single by Krewella

from the album Get Wet
- Released: December 9, 2013
- Recorded: 2011−2013
- Genre: Progressive house
- Length: 3:31
- Label: Columbia
- Songwriters: Yasmine Yousaf; Jahan Yousaf; Kris Trindl; Josh Alexander; Billy Steinberg; DallasK
- Producers: Rain Man; DallasK

Krewella singles chronology
"Live for the Night" (2013)	"Enjoy the Ride" (2013)	"Legacy" (2013)

"Enjoy the Ride" is a single by American electronic dance music band Krewella. The song was released on December 9, 2013 for digital download and streaming. It is the fifth and final single from their debut album Get Wet. actress Camren Bicondova appears in the song's music video.

== Background ==
Krewella's debut album Get Wet was released on September 20, 2013. It spawned four singles prior to the release of "Enjoy the Ride" these being "Killin' It", "Alive", "Come & Get It", and "Live For the Night."

== Single artwork and track composition ==
The single artwork was released prior to the release of the single itself on social media accounts belonging to Krewella, and was designed by the sister of Jahan and Yasmine. The track is deeply routed in progressive house with uplifting synths, piano embellishments, and sweeping orchestral sections.

== Promotion ==
A set of remixes by Vicetone and Armin van Buuren was released on March 3, 2014.

== Music video ==
The lyric video for "Enjoy the Ride" was released the day of the single's release. The official music video for "Enjoy The Ride" was released on March 6, 2014. In the video Krewella helps two young kids who are being held captive in an eerie steampunk-influenced carnival escape from their prison. Afterwards, Krewella invites them to come and dance whilst they perform in a forest.

Actress Camren Bicondova appears in the song's music video.

== Track listing ==
Digital Download
No.	Title	Writer(s)	Producer(s)	Length
1.	"Enjoy The Ride"	Yasmine Yousaf, Jahan Yousaf, Kris Trindl	Rain Man, DallasK	3:31

== Charts ==
=== Weekly charts ===
Chart (2014)	Peak position
US Hot Dance/Electronic Songs (Billboard)	29
US Dance Airplay (Billboard)	21

=== Year-end charts ===
Chart (2014)	Position
US Hot Dance/Electronic Songs (Billboard)	78
