= Somewhere to Run (song) =

Single by Krewella
- Released: March 23, 2015
- Genre: House, electronic rock, electronicore
- Length: 3:42
- Label: Columbia Records
- Songwriter(s): Jahan Yousaf; Yasmine Yousaf
- Producer(s): Don Gilmore; Pegboard Nerds

Krewella singles chronology
"Say Goodbye" (2014)	"Somewhere to Run" (2015)	"Beggars" (2016)

"Somewhere to Run" is a single by American electronic dance music band Krewella. The song was released on March 23, 2015, for digital download and streaming. It was featured in the trailer for the 2016 movie Nerve.

== Background ==
About the sound of the track, Krewella stated:

"We went back to the roots for that one,” says Yasmine. “The reason why we fell in love with dance music is people like Daft Punk, Justice, MSTRKRFT ... all those people were doing this grungy, punk-y dance stuff and we wanted to channel that for the new song that’s out."

== Music video ==
The video for the song was released onto YouTube on July 22, 2015. It features cameo performances from 3lau and Rory Kramer. The video sheds light on issues such as self-harm and suicide. The music video was directed by Rory Kramer and uploaded to their official Vevo channel.

== Critical reception ==
Matt Joseph from We Got This Covered gave "Somewhere to Run" a positive review stating, "After all, it's always exciting to see artists trying something different, no matter how it ends up working out."

== Track listing ==
Digital download
No.	Title	Length
1.	"Somewhere to Run"	3:42

Lost Kings Remixes
No.	Title	Length
1.	"Somewhere to Run" (Lost Kings Remix)	3:47
2.	"Somewhere to Run" (Lost Kings Nu Disco Remix)	3:36

== Charts ==
Chart (2015)	Peak position
US Dance/Mix Show Airplay (Billboard)	33
