= Peak (Krewella album) =

PEAK

Studio album by Krewella
- Released: September 4, 2026
- Genres: EDM; techno; bass; drum and bass
- Length: 37:08
- Label: Mixed Kids Records

Krewella chronology
| The Body Never Lies (2022) | PEAK (2026) |

Singles from Peak
- 1. "Crying on the Dancefloor" Released: June 9, 2025; 2. "Eternal" Released: November 5, 2025; 3. "Without You" Released: January 23, 2026; 4. "Something Sacred" Released: June 5, 2026; 5. "The Blueprint" Released: August 7, 2026

Peak (stylized in all caps) is the fourth studio album by American electronic dance music group Krewella. It was released on September 4, 2026, via their independent record label Mixed Kids Records. It was preceded by five singles; "Crying On The Dancefloor", "Eternal", "Without You", "Something Sacred" and "the blueprint".

== Background and release ==
Krewella's previous studio album The Body Never Lies was released in March 2022. Following this release, the duo went on an indefinite hiatus, returning to making music in April 2024, with the comeback and album's lead single "Crying On The Dancefloor" being released in June 2025. The next single "Eternal" was released in November 2025, followed by "Without You" in January 2026, "Something Sacred" in June 2026, and "the blueprint" in August 2026. The group stated in a press release that the single would feature in a forthcoming project.

Soon after the release of "the blueprint", the album titled PEAK was announced, and was released on September 4. They explained in an interview with Billboard that the album's concept and the title 'Peak' had various positive and negative meanings, including high moments in their lives, criticism that their career had 'peaked' and ultimately that goals in life are constantly changing. They stated that they are no longer chasing a peak when creating music, and are "just flowing with it". Other publications noted that the album explores existentialism, as well as the challenges of generative AI entering the music industry.

The artwork for the album was shot in an electronics recycling facility, depicting discarded tech amongst flowers and ivy. Promotion for the album included a partnership with TikTok Live, involving weekly live streams, and a release party with Brownies & Lemonade in Los Angeles the night before the album's release. Following the album's release, Krewella are set to embark on several headline shows and festival appearances in the US and UK, including a performance at Excision's Lost Lands festival later that month.

== Tracklist ==
All tracks written and produced by Jahan Yousaf and Yasmine Yousaf.

| No. | Title | Writer(s) | Producer(s) | Length |
|---|---|---|---|---|
| 1. | "Lost in Paraty (intro)" | | | 0:51 |
| 2. | "Press Play" | | | 2:22 |
| 3. | "Peak" | Cody Tarpley | Cody Tarpley^{[a]} | 3:52 |
| 4. | "Hear Me Now" | Cody Tarpley; Jenna Andrews | Cody Tarpley^{[a]} | 3:40 |
| 5. | "Crying on the Dancefloor" | Cody Tarpley | Cody Tarpley | 4:19 |
| 6. | "Eternal" | | | 3:13 |
| 7. | "Falling Rain" | | | 3:02 |
| 8. | "Till It Hits!" | Cody Tarpley | Cody Tarpley^{[a]} | 3:07 |
| 9. | "Where Did U Go?" | | | 2:46 |
| 10. | "Something Sacred" | | | 4:35 |
| 11. | "Without You" | | | 2:10 |
| 12. | "The Blueprint" | | | 3:11 |

Credits adapted from official YouTube channel and Spotify.

=== Notes ===
- ^{^[a]} indicates additional vocal producer.

== Personnel ==
- Jahan Yousaf - writing, production, vocals
- Yasmine Yousaf - writing, production, vocals
- Cody Tarpley - writing tracks 3, 4, 5, 7, production track 5, additional vocal production tracks 3, 4, 8
- Jenna Andrews - writing tracks 4
- James Lancaster - mixing, mastering
- Dave Kutch - mastering

Credits adapted from official YouTube channel and Spotify.
