= Play Hard (EP) =

EP by Krewella
- Released: June 18, 2012
- Genres: Electro house; Dubstep; Progressive House; Drum & Bass; Moombahton
- Length: 23:51
- Label: Krewella Music LLC
- Producers: Kris Trindl; Jahan Yousaf; Yasmine Yousaf

Krewella chronology
Play Hard (2012)	Get Wet (2013)

Remix EP cover

Singles from Play Hard
- 1. "One Minute" Released: September 6, 2011; 2. "Killin' It" Released: January 20, 2012; 3. "Alive" Released: February 5, 2013

Singles from Play Harder
- 1. "Come & Get It" Released: November 21, 2012

Play Hard is the debut EP from American electronic dance music band Krewella. It was released on June 18, 2012, with tour dates spanning the third quarter of that year. Group member Yasmine states that the name was created by "this concept of working hard and playing harder because no matter what we are doing whether it be partying or making music we always go hard". It featured the track Alive, which reached number 32 on the Billboard Hot 100, and remains their highest charting song to date.

A remix EP titled Play Harder was released on December 10 2012.

== Track listing ==
Play Hard
No.	Title	Writer(s)	Length
1.	"Play Hard"	Jahan Yousaf; Kris Trindl; Yasmine Yousaf	4:26
2.	"Killin' It"	J. Yousaf; Trindl; Y. Yousaf; Nathan Lim; Jake Udell	3:27
3.	"Can't Control Myself"	J. Yousaf; Trindl; Y. Yousaf	3:39
4.	"Alive"	J. Yousaf; Trindl; Y. Yousaf; Lim; Udell	4:50
5.	"One Minute"	J. Yousaf; Trindl; Y. Yousaf	4:13
6.	"Feel Me"	J. Yousaf; Trindl; Y. Yousaf	3:16
Total length:			23:51

Play Harder (Remix EP)
No.	Title	Writer(s)	Length
1.	"Come & Get It"	J. Yousaf; Kris Trindl; Y. Yousaf; Melissa Arzoomanian; Mike McGarity	3:26
2.	"Alive" (Cash Cash & DJ Kalkutta Remix)		5:32
3.	"Alive" (Pegboard Nerds Remix)		5:15
4.	"Alive" (Jakob Liedholm Remix)		6:15
5.	"Killin' It" (Mutrix Remix)		4:21
6.	"Killin' It" (KillaGraham Remix)		4:06
7.	"Killin' It" (Dirtyphonics Remix)		4:11
8.	"Killin' It" (DJ Chuckie Remix)		6:37
Total length:			39:40

== Charts ==
=== EP ===
Chart (2012)	Peak position
US Top Dance Albums (Billboard)	6
US Heatseekers Albums (Billboard)	2

=== Singles ===
Title	Year	Peak chart positions						Certifications
Title	Year	US	US Dance	BEL (WA) Tip	CAN	FRA	NLD	Certifications
"One Minute"	2011	—	34	—	—	—	—	
"Come & Get It"	2012	—	41	—	—	—	—	
"Alive"	2013	32	5	22	50	159	81	RIAA: Platinum
"—" denotes a recording that did not chart or was not released in that territory.
