= Alive (Krewella song) =

Single by Krewella

from the album Play Hard and Get Wet
- Released: June 18, 2012
- Recorded: 2012
- Genre: Europop; progressive house
- Length: 4:50 (EP / album version / original); 3:27 (video / radio edit)
- Label: Krewella; Columbia
- Songwriters: Jahan Yousaf; Yasmine Yousaf; Kris Trindl; Nathan Lim; Jake Udell
- Producer: Rain Man

Krewella singles chronology
"Come & Get It" (2012)	"Alive" (2012)	"Live for the Night" (2013)

"Alive" is a song by American electronic dance music group Krewella. The song was originally released in June 2012 as the third single from their debut EP Play Hard, but was re-released in February 2013. The song was the group's first and only top 40 hit on the US Billboard Hot 100, charting at 32. It is also featured on their debut album, Get Wet (2013).

== Music video ==
The video for the song was released onto Vimeo on December 5, 2012, and on YouTube and Vevo on December 18, 2012. The video shows the band in a desert dancing, starting a fire (on which a plush panda is later seen burning) and smashing the walls of a vandalized house and other objects with bats.

== Track listing ==
Digital download
No.	Title	Length
1.	"Alive"	3:27
2.	"Alive" (Hardwell Remix)	5:54
3.	"Alive" (Cash Cash and Kalkutta Remix)	5:32
4.	"Alive" (Pegboard Nerds Remix)	5:15
5.	"Alive" (Jakob Liedholm Remix)	6:15
6.	"Alive" (Stephen Swartz Remix)	4:52

== Charts and certifications ==
=== Weekly charts ===
Chart (2013)	Peak position
Belgium (Ultratip Bubbling Under Flanders)	24
Belgium (Ultratip Bubbling Under Wallonia)	22
Canada Hot 100 (Billboard)	50
Czech Republic Airplay (ČNS IFPI)	30
France (SNEP)	159
Mexico Ingles Airplay (Billboard)	5
Netherlands (Single Top 100)	81
Poland Dance (ZPAV)	28
Slovakia Airplay (ČNS IFPI)	96
US Billboard Hot 100	32
US Hot Dance/Electronic Songs (Billboard)	5
US Pop Airplay (Billboard)	9
US Rhythmic Airplay (Billboard)	27

=== Year-end charts ===
Chart (2013)	Position
US Hot Dance/Electronic Songs (Billboard)	15

=== Certifications ===
Region	Certification	Certified units/sales
United States (RIAA)	Platinum	1,000,000^{*}
^{*} Sales figures based on certification alone.

== Release history ==
Release dates and formats for "Alive"
Region	Date	Format	Label(s)	Ref.
United States	February 5, 2013	Mainstream airplay	Columbia	
