= Greenlights (song) =

2020 single by Krewella

Single by Krewella

from the album Zer0
- Released: January 21, 2020
- Recorded: 2020
- Genre: Future bass
- Length: 2:42(album version / original); 2:40 (video / radio edit)
- Label: Krewella; Mixed Kids
- Songwriters: Jahan Yousaf; Yasmine Yousaf; C. Tarpley
- Producers: Jahan Yousaf; Yasmine Yousaf; C. Tarpley

Krewella singles chronology
"Good on You" (2019)	"Greenlights" (2020)	"Goddess" (2020)

Music video
- "Greenlights" on YouTube

"Greenlights" is a song by American electronic dance music group Krewella. It is the current duo’s fourth single release from their second album Zer0, and their second number one single (as well as their 11th charted single and fifth top ten) on Billboard’s Dance/Mix Show Airplay, reaching the top spot in its April 18, 2020 issue.

The single was used in a commercial campaign for Orangetheory Fitness that was launched in December 2019 prior to its release as a single to Dance radio in January 2020. In an interview with Billboard, the Yousaf sisters describe the song’s motivation theme which led to the ad campaign: "We were so inspired to write a song that exhibited the meaning of ‘more life," adding that "because we’re constantly searching for different ways to tear down our own insecurities, barriers, or whatever else gets in the way of us growing as people. Movement is so important to us, whether on stage or in any other aspect of life, and giving others a reason to push further through our music is a dream for us."

Two remixes by MADGRRL and Toneshifterz were released as part of the Zer0 remix packages in March and April respectively. An acoustic single was released in May.

== Charts ==
Chart performance for "Greenlights"
Chart (2021)	Peak position
US Hot Dance/Electronic Songs (Billboard)	21

== See also ==
- List of Billboard number-one dance songs of 2020
