= Jake Udell =

American music manager

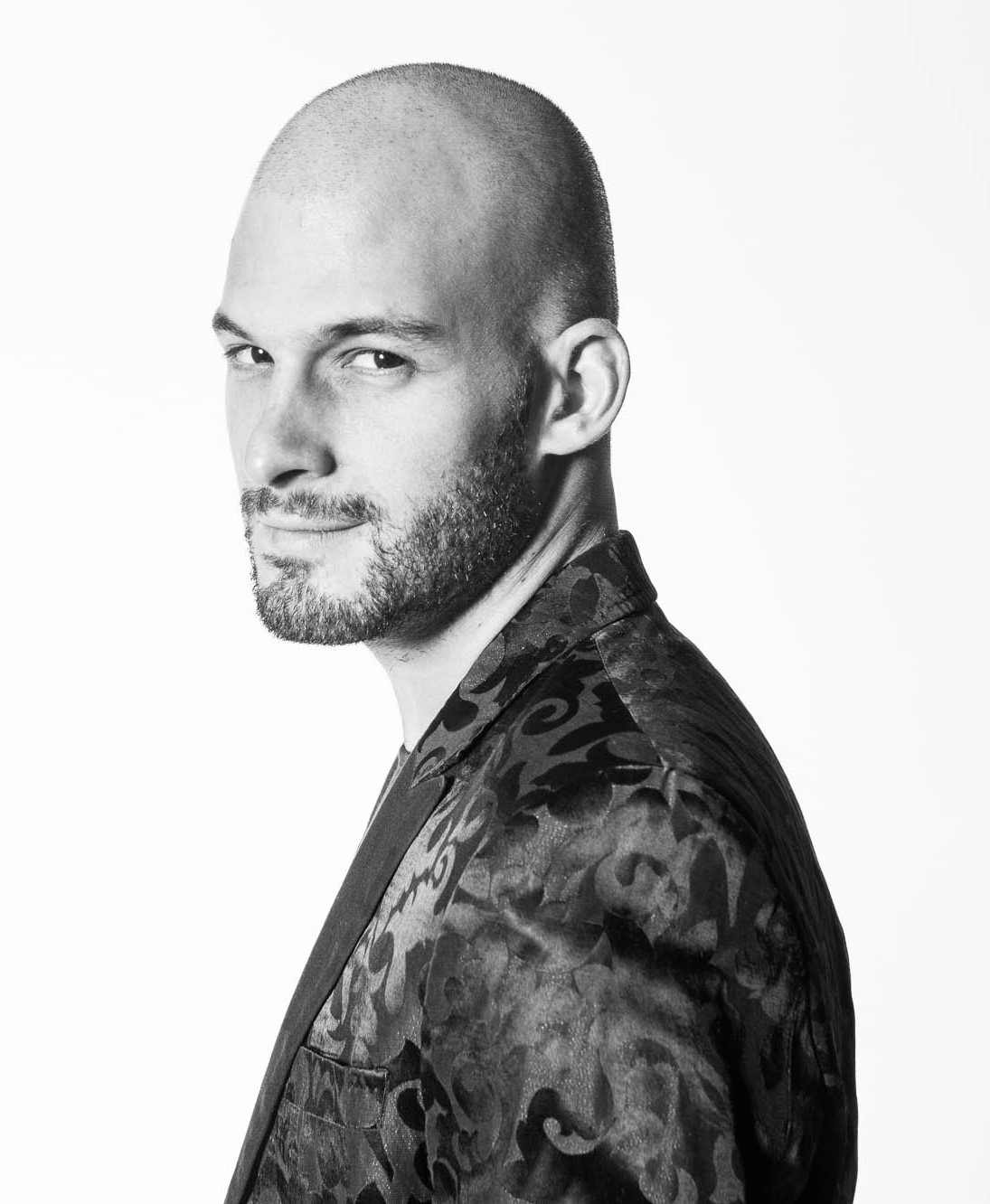

Background information
- Born: Jake Udell
- Origin: Northbrook, Illinois
- Genres: Pop, R&B, dance, alternative rock, indie
- Occupations: Music manager, entrepreneur, founder/owner/CEO of TH3RD BRAIN; Founder & Chief Executive Officer, Metalink Labs
- Years active: 2012–2018
- Labels: TH3RD BRAIN
- Website: www.th3rdbrain.com

Jake Udell (born February 21, 1989) is an American music manager, entrepreneur, founder of TH3RD BRAIN (a talent management company), former head of activation at Community.com, and founder of Metalink Labs. At the EDMbiz conference in Las Vegas in June 2014, Udell moderated a panel featuring panelists in the industry under the age of 30. After viewing the panel, music industry analyst Bob Lefsetz included an excerpt about Udell in his newsletter, "Jake is a new Shep Gordon, maybe a new Irving or Geffen." Udell was featured in Forbes 2016 30 Under 30 list in the Music category, and was listed as one of Billboard's 40 Under 40 in 2017.

== Education and early career ==
At the age of 13, Udell began selling autographed sports memorabilia, most of which he attained by encountering athletes in-person, on eBay. Initially operating out of Chicago, by the time he was 16 Udell had hired a team of people in different cities which allowed him to cover most of the major sporting events in the United States.

Udell attended Indiana University and briefly pursued a career as a performer before getting involved in music management and promotion. In 2011, Udell graduated from the Indiana University Kelley School of Business with a degree in entrepreneurship. After graduating, he worked for Campus Candy for one year as the company's chief marketing officer.

=== TH3RD BRAIN ===
In early 2012 Udell founded TH3RD BRAIN, a talent management firm, claiming his motivation for becoming a manager was that Krewella was the first act he believed in more than his own performing career. Udell had attended Glenbrook North High School in Chicago with Krewella. He vacated his CMO role at Campus Candy and assumed management responsibilities. TH3RD BRAIN has helped launch the careers of the platinum-selling electronic music group Krewella, Grammy-nominated musician ZHU, and Spotify Spotlight Artist Gallant. Billboard noted Udell's social media strategy for Krewella and chronicled their meteoric rise in 2013, focusing on TH3RD BRAIN's work with blogs, narrative building, and free downloads. Udell's recording artist roster also includes Pegboard Nerds, Stephen, and others.

After a bidding war, Krewella signed to Columbia Records, and released their first album Get Wet in 2013. The album debuted at number 8 on the Billboard 200 chart. After selling out all 55 dates of the group's first North American headlining 2013 Get Wet Live tour, Krewella's single "Alive" reached platinum status in 2014.

While still managing Krewella, in 2013 Jake Udell began developing TH3RD BRAIN's next client ZHU. In December 2014, "Faded" was nominated for Best Dance Recording at the 57th Grammy Awards, and ZHU continued to perform with a hidden identity and embraced non-traditional advertising methods with street art, flash announcements, and guerrilla digital marketing.

In November 2016, Udell interviewed music manager Shep Gordon.

In 2017, Udell signed 2016 America's Got Talent winner Grace VanderWaal to management under TH3RD BRAIN; and led the marketing campaign for her debut album Just the Beginning. VanderWall said of Udell, "Jake doesn't think the way most people in the industry do, that makes him stand out to so many young artists." Udell was named one of Billboard's 40 Under 40 leading media industry executives in 2017.

Udell writes a daily newsletter covering topics for the music industry.

==== TH3RD BRAIN Accelerator ====
In 2016, Udell launched TH3RD BRAIN Accelerator, a twelve-week program aimed at helping the development of promising musicians, modeled after tech entrepreneur Paul Graham's Y Combinator. The program helps teach artists how to grow their business and maximize their impact on culture and in the marketplace.

=== Community.com ===
Udell became head of activation for Community.com, Inc., a SaaS company specializing in outreach, after launching a text-messaging campaign to reach musician's fans due to limitations he saw with social media algorithms. "The thing I kept noticing was that the algorithms were making it really challenging for us to reach our audiences," Udell told dot.LA.

=== Metalink Labs ===
In July 2021, Udell founded Metalink Labs, becoming the company's CEO. He later left Community.com in September 2021, going full-time on "The place where NFTs hang out".
