= Taylor Bennett (rapper) =

American rapper

- Born: Taylor Matthew Bennett; January 19, 1996 (age 30); Chicago, Illinois, U.S.
- Genre: Alternative hip-hop
- Occupations: Rapper; singer; songwriter
- Years active: 2013–present
- Labels: Tay Bennett Entertainment; UnitedMasters

Taylor Matthew Bennett (born January 19, 1996) is an American rapper. The younger brother of fellow rapper Chance the Rapper, he is from the West Chatham neighborhood of Chicago, Illinois.

== Early life ==
Taylor Bennett's father, Ken Williams-Bennett, worked for the Mayor of Chicago and his mother Lisa Bennett formerly worked for the attorney general. His father ensured that he would pursue his dreams while also making it through school. He attended Urban Prep High School. He and his brother demonstrated an interest in the arts very early, rapping with each other and building their skills.

In 2014, Bennett and others were charged with assault and battery for allegedly severely injuring a teenage Columbia College Chicago student at a party. They beat the victim badly after he stepped on Bennett's shoe.

== Career ==
Much like his brother, Bennett has developed a unique sound and style of rapping. Some artists that have influenced his growth as a musician include Twista, Nas, and Kendrick Lamar who has had a noticeable impact on his music. He claims that Kanye West's College Dropout had a significant role in his ability to see the fun-loving side of music.

Bennett's brother preferred that he build his own fanbase before he began working with and promoting him. Chance believed this was an important step in his development as an artist. Bennett finally started selling out shows at local venues such as Reggie's and even opened for his idol Nas at a Lollapalooza after party in 2014. Following his success, he and his brother released a track "Broad Shoulders", which is also the title track of one of his most recent mixtapes.

In 2015, Bennett released the mixtape "Broad Shoulders". It features artists such as Logan Parks, Talia Stewart, and Jordan Bratton, most of whom are native Chicagoans. This was also his first full album without any elements sampled from preexisting songs. In July 2018, Bennett released a single titled "Rock n Roll" along with the video from his upcoming EP, "Be Yourself".

== Personal life ==
On January 18, 2017, Bennett came out as bisexual on his Twitter account before his 21st birthday.

=== Legal issues ===
On October 17, 2014, an article was released from DNAinfo reporting that Bennett was involved in an altercation at a house party in his native city of Chicago that left his victim with major head trauma. The article states that Bennett and his friend attacked the victim after the victim stepped on Bennett's shoes. The incident was captured on video by attendees at the party, who would identify Bennett on social media. Bennett would turn himself in and be released on a $75,000 bond.

== Discography ==
=== Albums ===
List of studio albums, with selected details
Title	Album details
Broad Shoulders	Released: December 14, 2015; Label: Self-released; Format: Digital download
Restoration of an American Idol	Released: February 24, 2017; Label: Self-released; Format: Digital download
Be Yourself	Released: July 13, 2018; Label: Self-released; Format: Digital download
Coming of Age	Released: April 22, 2022; Label: Self-released; Format: Digital download

=== Mixtapes ===
List of mixtapes, with selected details
Title	Mixtape details
The Taylor Bennett Show	Released: December 5, 2013; Label: Self-released; Format: Digital download
Mainstream Music	Released: May 1, 2014; Label: Self-released; Format: Digital download
Throw Aways: Unmixed	Released: August 19, 2017; Label: Self-released; Format: SoundCloud Playlist

=== Extended plays ===
List of extended plays, with selected details
Title	EP details
Freshman Year: First Semester	Released: October 15, 2014; Label: Self-released; Format: Digital download
The American Reject	Released: May 28, 2019; Label: Self-released; Format: Digital download

=== Singles ===
==== As featured artist ====
List of singles as featured artist, with selected chart positions, showing year released and album name
Title	Year	Peak chart positions	Album
Title	Year	US Dance	Album
"Holiday" (James The Mormon featuring Taylor Bennett)	2017	—	Non-album singles
"Sleepless" (Melo Makes Music featuring Taylor Bennett)	2017	—	Non-album singles
"Views of You" (Sofi de la Torre featuring Taylor Bennett)	2017	—	Another. Not me. I'm Done.
"Walls" (Madds featuring Taylor Bennett and Emilie Brandt)	2017	—	Non-album singles
"New World" (Krewella and Yellow Claw featuring Taylor Bennett)	2017	29	Non-album singles
