= Lookas =

American music producer and DJ

Background information
- Born: Lucas Rego; 1995 (age 30–31)
- Origin: Miami, Florida, United States
- Genres: Trap; future bass
- Occupations: Music producer; DJ
- Years active: 2013–present
- Labels: Atlantic; Interscope; Monstercat; Island
- Website: www.lookasmusic.com

Lucas Rego (born 1995), known by his stage name Lookas, is an American music producer and DJ. He is best known for his contribution to Flo Rida's charted single, "G.D.F.R.".

== Career ==
Rego began his music career as a teenager, when he chose music over college for a year. He credits the Miami club scene for his drive to publish.

In an interview with EDM Sauce, Rego described the music scene as "trying to figure out what the next big thing is", and shares his production experience as a motivation for improvement.

Rego's debut extended play, Lucid, was announced in early 2017, and released on Monstercat in January 2018.

== Discography ==
=== Extended plays ===
Title	Album details
Lucid	Released: January 19, 2018; Label: Monstercat

=== Charted singles ===
==== As featured artist ====
Title	Year	Peak chart positions				Album
Title	Year	US	AUS	CAN	UK	Album
"G.D.F.R." (Flo Rida featuring Sage the Gemini and Lookas)	2014	8	36	10	3	My House

=== Other singles ===
Title	Year	Album
"6 A.M." (with Smle)	2014	Non-album singles
"Chaos" (with Jayden Parx)	2015	Non-album singles
"Apollo"	2015	Non-album singles
"Voyager"	2015	Non-album singles
"Mercy"	2015	Non-album singles
"Game Over" (with Crankdat)	2016	Non-album singles
"Eclipse"	2017	Lucid
"Alarm" (with Krewella)	2017	Lucid
"On My Own" (with Able Heart)	2018	Lucid
"Deep Breaths" (featuring Cal Shapiro)	2018	Non-album singles
"Voodoo" (with Edison Cole)	2019	Non-album singles
"Redline"	2019	TBA

== Music videos ==
Artist	Song	Year
Lookas and Jayden Parx	Chaos	2014
Flo Rida featuring Sage the Gemini and Lookas	G.D.F.R.	2014
Lookas	Voyager	2015
Lookas	Eclipse	2018
Lookas and Krewella	Alarm	2018
