= Get Wet (Krewella album) =

Studio album by Krewella
- Released: September 20, 2013
- Recorded: 2011–2013
- Length: 51:53
- Label: Columbia
- Producers: Rain Man; Cash Cash; Quicy Kwalae; Dallas K; Savoy; SmarterChild; The Cataracs; Ethan Davis; KillaGraham; Stephen Swartz; Pegboard Nerds; Gareth Emery

Krewella chronology
| Play Hard (2012) | Get Wet (2013) | Ammunition (2016) |

Singles from Get Wet
- 1. "Killin' It" Released: January 20, 2012; 2. "Come & Get It" Released: November 21, 2012; 3. "Alive" Released: February 5, 2013; 4. "Live for the Night" Released: July 2, 2013; 5. "Enjoy the Ride" Released: December 9, 2013

Get Wet is the debut studio album by American electronic dance music band Krewella. It was released in the United States on September 24, 2013, by Columbia Records. This is their only album with former member, Kris Trindl, who later resigned from the group in 2014. It was preceded by the singles "Killin' It", "Come & Get It", "Alive", "Live for the Night" and "Enjoy the Ride".

== Chart performance ==
Get Wet debuted at number eight on the Billboard 200, with 27,000 copies sold in its first week. The album made its debut at number forty on the New Zealand Albums Chart.

== Track listing ==
Standard edition
| No. | Title | Writer(s) | Producer(s) | Length |
|---|---|---|---|---|
| 1. | "Live for the Night" | Jahan Yousaf; Yasmine Yousaf; Kristopher Trindl; Jean Paul Makhlouf; Alexander Luke Makhlouf; Samuel Frisch; Nicholas Ditri; Daniel BoseLovic | Cash Cash | 3:26 |
| 2. | "We Go Down" | J. Yousaf; Y. Yousaf; Trindl; Toby Gad | Rain Man; Quincy Kwalae (co.) | 3:05 |
| 3. | "Come & Get It" | J. Yousaf; Y. Yousaf; Trindl; Melissa Arzoomanian; Mike McGarity | Rain Man | 3:25 |
| 4. | "Enjoy the Ride" | J. Yousaf; Y. Yousaf; Josh Alexander; Billy Steinberg; Trindl; Dallas K | Rain Man; Dallas K; Quincy Kwalae (add.) | 3:31 |
| 5. | "We Are One" | J. Yousaf; Y. Yousaf; Trindl | Rain Man | 4:36 |
| 6. | "Dancing with the Devil" (featuring Patrick Stump and Travis Barker) | J. Yousaf; Y. Yousaf; Trindl; Patrick Stump; Gray Smith; Ben Ebertd | Rain Man; SAVOY (co.) | 3:58 |
| 7. | "Alive" | J. Yousaf; Y. Yousaf; Trindl; Nathan Lim; Jake Udell | Rain Man | 4:48 |
| 8. | "Pass the Love Around" | J. Yousaf; Y. Yousaf; Trindl; Emily Warren; Scott Harris; Rick Markowitz | SmarterChild | 3:18 |
| 9. | "Ring of Fire" | J. Yousaf; Y. Yousaf; Trindl; Graham A. Muron; Ethan Davis; Niles Dhar; Meghan Kabir; A. Jeff Halavacs | Rain Man; CandyLand; The Cataracs; KillaGraham | 4:23 |
| 10. | "Human" | J. Yousaf; Y. Yousaf; Gad; Trindl; Quincy Harrison; Stephan Swartz | Rain Man; Quincy Kwalae (co.); Stephen Swartz (co.) | 3:15 |
| 11. | "Killin' It" | J. Yousaf; Y. Yousaf; Trindl; Udell; Lim | Rain Man | 3:26 |
| 12. | "This Is Not the End" (featuring Pegboard Nerds) | J. Yousaf; Y. Yousaf; Trindl; Alexander Odden; Michael Parsberg | Pegboard Nerds | 3:53 |

iTunes bonus tracks
| No. | Title | Producer(s) | Length |
|---|---|---|---|
| 13. | "Lights and Thunder" (featuring Gareth Emery) | Gareth Emery | 4:42 |
| 14. | "Enjoy the Ride" (Acoustic version) | | 3:28 |

Japan edition bonus tracks
| No. | Title | Length |
|---|---|---|
| 13. | "Play Hard" | 4:26 |
| 14. | "Life of the Party" (featuring S-Preme) | 3:59 |
| 15. | "Strobelights" | 3:41 |
| 16. | "Live For The Night" (Dash Berlin Remix) | 5:20 |
| 17. | "Alive" (Hardwell Remix) | 5:52 |
| 18. | "Alive" (Pegboard Nerds Remix) | 5:14 |
| 19. | "Alive" (Cash Cash & Kalkutta Remix) | 5:32 |

== Charts ==
=== Weekly charts ===
| Chart (2013) | Peak position |
|---|---|
| Australian Albums (ARIA) | 45 |
| Canadian Albums (Billboard) | 14 |
| Japanese Albums (Oricon) | 55 |
| New Zealand Albums (RMNZ) | 40 |
| UK Albums (Official Charts) | 179 |
| US Billboard 200 | 8 |
| US Top Dance Albums (Billboard) | 1 |

=== Year-end charts ===
| Chart (2013) | Position |
|---|---|
| US Top Dance/Electronic Albums (Billboard) | 22 |
| Chart (2014) | Position |
| US Top Dance/Electronic Albums (Billboard) | 25 |

== Release history ==
| Region | Date | Label | Format(s) |
|---|---|---|---|
| Australia, Germany | September 20, 2013 | Sony Music Entertainment | CD, digital download |
| United Kingdom | September 23, 2013 | RCA Records | CD, digital download |
| United States | September 24, 2013 | Columbia Records | CD, digital download |
| Japan | March 19, 2014 | Sony Music Entertainment Japan | CD, digital download |
