= Krewella =

American electronic dance music group

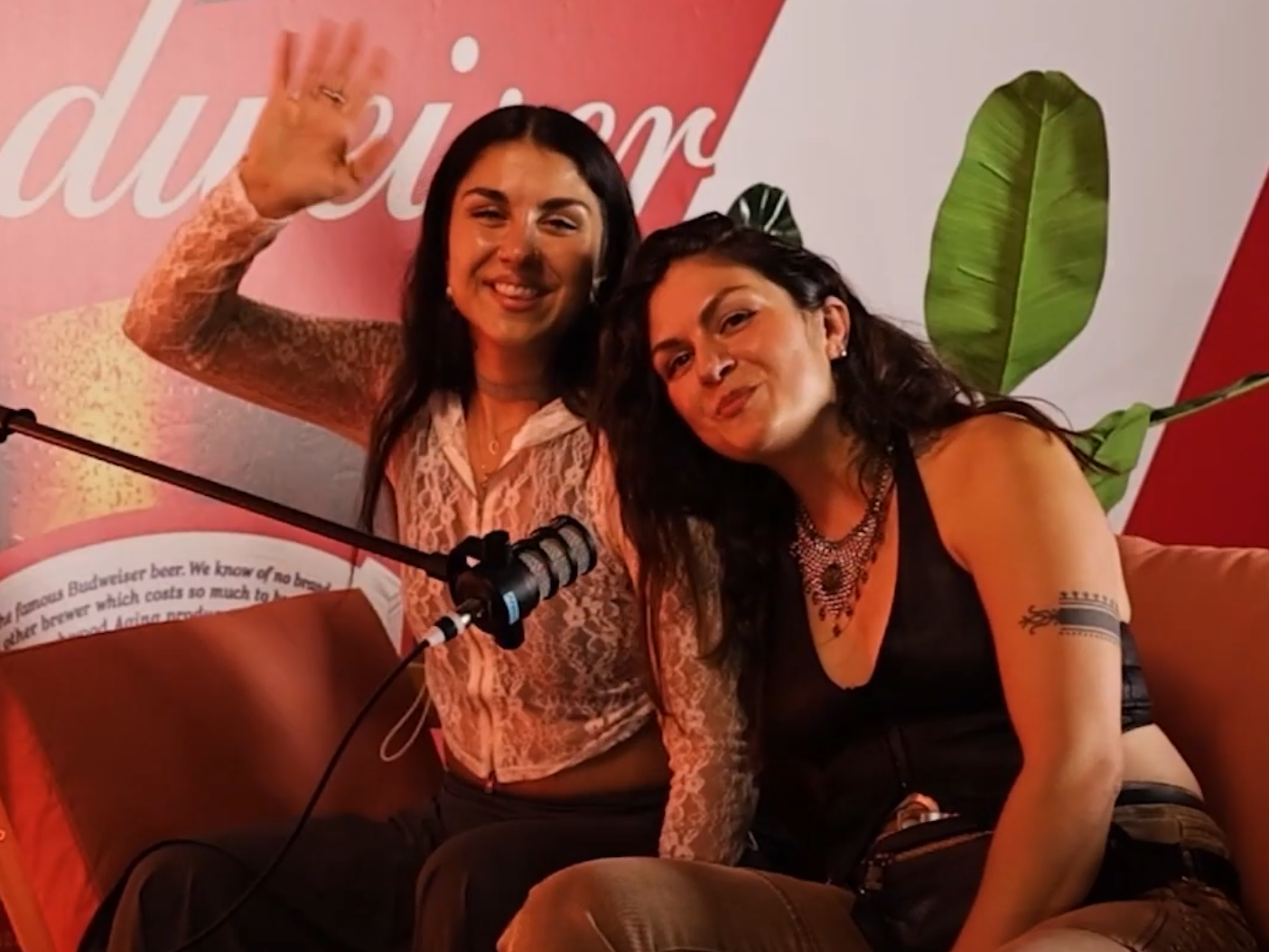
- Krewella in 2025

Background information
- Origin: Northbrook, Illinois, U.S.
- Genres: Electronic dance music; dance pop; dance rock
- Years active: 2007–present
- Labels: Columbia; Monstercat; Mixed Kids
- Members: Jahan Yousaf; Yasmine Yousaf
- Past members: Kristopher Trindl
- Website: krewella.com

Krewella is an American electronic dance music group formed in Northbrook, Illinois, a suburb of Chicago in 2007. The duo consists of sisters Jahan and Yasmine Yousaf; Kristopher Trindl was a member during their commercial peak in the early 2010s, and split from the group in 2014.

Krewella received early attention with their debut extended play, Play Hard (2012), which peaked at number six on the Billboard Top Dance Albums chart. Their debut album, Get Wet (2013), topped the Billboard Top Dance Albums chart and peaked at number eight on the Billboard 200. The single "Alive" was featured on both projects, which peaked at 32 on the Billboard Hot 100 and sold over a million copies worldwide. Two more singles from Get Wet, "Live for the Night" and "Enjoy the Ride", experienced similar success.

== History ==
=== 2007–2013: Foundation and breakthrough with Get Wet ===
Krewella was formed in 2007 by American sisters Jahan and Yasmine Yousaf, both of Pakistani, German and Lithuanian descent, together with producer Kris Trindl. Jahan and Kris met at a Glenbrook North High School party in 2006, and soon recruited Yasmine to join them. They began posting their music on Myspace in 2009. All three members of the band have "6-8-10" tattoos to commemorate June 8, 2010, the day when the three agreed to give up their careers, schooling, and any other intentions for their lives, to dedicate all of their time to the band's joint music career.

Krewella's first official singles, "Life of the Party" (featuring S-Preme) and "Strobelights" were released on July 11 2011. Their next song "One Minute" was released later that year. In December 2011, they released "Killin' It" with Canadian independent electronic music label Monstercat; it was Krewella's first original song released by a label.

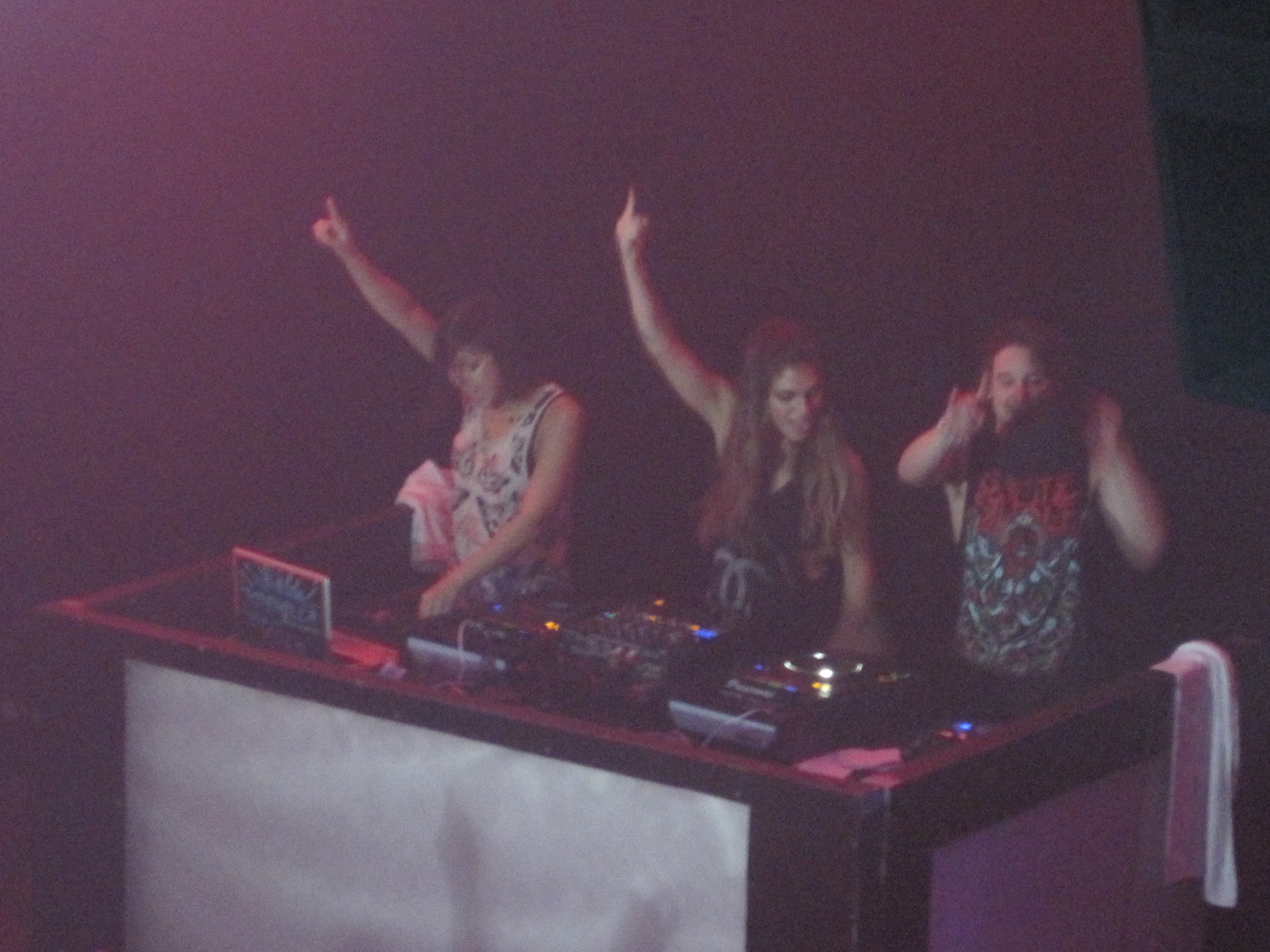
Krewella performing in 2012

In June 2012, Krewella released their EP Play Hard. The second single, "Alive" peaked at number one on the US Dance/Mix Show Airplay chart and also placed on the US Billboard Hot 100. Krewella has headlined at EDM festivals around the globe including Ultra Music Festival, Electric Daisy Carnival, Stereosonic, Spring Awakening, Sunburn Festival and Paradiso festival. These live performances earned them the 2012 International Dance Music Award for "Best Breakthrough Artist." After their performance at Ultra Music Festival 2013, Billboard declared that "Krewella is going to be huge!"

The group released Live for the Night in July 2013, produced by Cash Cash. Their debut album Get Wet was released in September 2013 and charted in the top 10 of the US Billboard 200 in its first week. They embarked on the Get Wet Tour that same month, with support from Seven Lions and Candyland.

=== 2014–2015: Trindl's departure and conflicts ===
In January 2014, Krewella partnered with EDM lifestyle brand Electric Family to raise money for Dance For Paralysis. The partnership raised over $17,000. On September 20, 2014, it was announced that Trindl is no longer part of Krewella. Trindl subsequently filed a lawsuit against the sisters for $5 million, claiming that he was unfairly "thrown out" of the band. The Yousaf sisters countersued, claiming Trindl had drug and alcohol problems, "pretended to DJ" onstage, and ultimately resigned from the band. On November 24, 2014, Krewella released their first single following Trindl's departure titled "Say Goodbye", which was initially released through a live stream in which they announced they would be "speaking out" against the lawsuit.

On March 23, 2015, Krewella released "Somewhere to Run" produced by Pegboard Nerds and others. In June 2015, Krewella's "Somewhere to Run" was featured in the Las Vegas Convention and Visitors Authority's "Krewellavator" marketing campaign. The spot was filmed in an actual elevator at the MGM Grand Las Vegas. Krewella released Troll mix Vol. 14 - Return of the Trolls on August 15, 2015, its title a reference to the time gap following the previous one. This mix is the first released after Trindl's departure. The hour long mix features a new track from the sisters, named "Surrender the Throne". It also includes a new remix of their single "Somewhere to Run".

The sisters were featured on the single "Love Song to the Earth" alongside; Paul McCartney, Jon Bon Jovi, Sheryl Crow, Fergie, Colbie Caillat, Natasha Bedingfield, Leona Lewis, Sean Paul, Johnny Rzeznik, Angélique Kidjo, Kelsea Ballerini, Nicole Scherzinger, Christina Grimmie, Victoria Justice and Q'orianka Kilcher. In August 2015, it was announced that Jahan and Yasmine Yousaf had settled the lawsuit with Kris Trindl out-of-court. The terms of the settlement were not made public.

=== 2016–2017: Extended plays and singles ===
Krewella announced in 2015, that they had been working on a new body of work, intended to be completed in time for a 2016 tour.

The single "Beggars" (With Diskord) was released on April 29, 2016 alongside a music video. Krewella were set to present at the inaugural Electronic Music Awards which were supposed to be held on April 23, 2016, but were postponed to later in the year.

On May 4, 2016, a video titled "Love, Yazzy" was released to the public of Yasmine speaking of her memories of Krewella since her beginnings with the band. The end of the video stated the release date of Ammunition which was May 20, 2016. Two days after this, a video titled "Love, Jahan" which talked about unity and a "Krew without borders" before announcing a new, smaller more intimate Sweatbox Tour. This headlining Fall tour spanned across 16 dates in North America and Canada and featured brand new music and their entire live band.

On May 10, 2016, the promotional single "Broken Record" was released. On the last few days before the release, teasers for "Surrender the Throne", "Marching On", "Beggars", "Broken Record", "Ammunition", and "Can't Forget You" were released, with the latter being released one day before Ammunition's release. On May 27, 2016, Krewella was featured on a single by Pegboard Nerds and NGHTMRE titled "Superstar".

In an interview with Gary Vee, the sisters stated that they were currently in the studio working on a follow-up to Ammunition. The next single "Team" was released in December 2016. "Be There" was released on May 10, 2017, being the first released on their new independent label Mixed Kids Records.

In 2017, Krewella partnered with dance-fitness program Zumba, including creating music for the program and playing a 'fitness concert' in Los Angeles. The next single "Love Outta Me" was released on May 31, 2017. They released the first part of their two part EP New World on June 8, 2017. They later announced their New World Tour, commencing in September that year, and including support from various artists including Shaun Frank, Unlike Pluto and Crankdat.

Krewella estimated that New World Part 2 would be released by mid-2017, then later by early September 2017 and before their New World Tour, but neither of these release dates eventuated. "Dead AF" was later released as a single on October 24, 2017. "Another Round" with Pegboard Nerds was released on November 17, "Alarm" with Lookas was released on December 1, and "Ain't That Why" with R3hab was released on December 8. "Angels Cry" was released on December 31, 2017 as a free release.

=== 2018–2020: Coke Studio and zer0 ===
In January 2018, Krewella released a version of "New World" (with Yellow Claw) featuring Chinese rapper Vava. The song was later featured in the video game Just Dance 2019.

In February 2018, Krewella released "Alibi" alongside a music video, which featured footage from their New World Tour. In April, they released "Runaway". An animated music video was released in May created by 3D Multimedia production studio Blunt Action. The next single, "Gold Wings" with Shaun Frank was released in May 2018. In June 2018, they released a cover of Bazzi's track "Mine" with BKAYE, as part of a compilation album by Cure8 records titled "disCOVERED vol. 1". Krewella also released "Bad Liar" later that month.

As of July 2018, they are featured in Coke Studio Pakistan Season 11 as featured artists and were also part of the well-received Season promo song "Hum Dekhenge" which was rendition of Poem written by Faiz Ahmad Faiz. They performed a rendition of their song Runaway with Riaz Qadri and Ghulam Ali Qadri.

In August 2018, they released "Soldier" in collaboration with American bass producer Jauz as part of his album "The Wise and the Wicked". The first single from their next album, "Mana" was released on August 22, 2019. A music video created by French artist Gabyo was released on the same day, featuring an extended version of the song. The extended version was released on streaming platforms in September 2019, alongside a remix by American producer Slippy. The second single, "Ghost" was released in October 2019, alongside a music video.

In December 2019, Krewella released "Good On You" in collaboration with Indian producer Nucleya. On the same day, they announced their second studio album "zer0", due to be released on January 31. A music video for "Good On You" was released two weeks later. The final single from the album, "Greenlights" was released on January 18, 2020. A music video was released on the same day,

The album zer0 was released on January 31, 2020. The album featured the tracks "zer0", "Mana" (Extended Mix), "Good On You" (with Nucleya), "Anxiety" (featuring Arrested Youth), "Paradise" (featuring Asim Azhar), "Like We" (featuring Yung Baby Tate and Alaya), "Scissors", "Ghost", "Martyr", "Overboard" and "Greenlights". A tour for the album was announced, featuring 13 shows across North America, set to begin in April 2020. The tour was cancelled due to the COVID-19 pandemic. Two remix EPs of zer0 were later released in March and April 2020 respectively, featuring remixes from Moti, Prince Fox, Futuristic Polar Bears and others.

In May 2020, Krewella released "Goddess" in collaboration with Australian sister duo Nervo, featuring Indo-American rapper Raja Kumari. In July 2020, Krewella released "Rewind" with Yellow Claw, alongside an animated music video. Due to the cancellation of the "zer0" Tour, Krewella worked with Insomniac Events to create the "zer0 Live Concert Experience"; a virtual event held on November 27, 2020. This featured a hybrid DJ/Live Vocal set from Krewella, as well as DJ sets from support acts SHIVARASA and REAPER, both of whom were featured on the zer0 remix EPs. The event was broadcast on Insomniac's Twitch page, and has since been uploaded to both Insomniac and Krewella's YouTube channels. During this, they premiered a new song, "Lay It Down", which was released as a bonus track on the limited "zer0" vinyl.

=== 2021–2022: The Body Never Lies and hiatus ===
In July 2021, Krewella released "Lay It Down" in collaboration with Illenium and Slander, as part of Illenium's album Fallen Embers. This track was based on the previous, solo version of "Lay It Down" that was released exclusively on the "zer0" vinyl. In November 2021, Krewella announced their next single, "Never Been Hurt" in collaboration with Beauz. The track was released alongside a music video on November 19. On December 17, 2021, they released "No Control" with Madgrrl. A music video was released on December 25.

In January 2022, Krewella announced their third studio album The Body Never Lies to be released on March 4. The album features 10 tracks, including "Never Been Hurt" and "No Control". They also announced a North American tour, featuring 20 shows, beginning in April. Soon after, they announced the next single off the album, titled "I'm Just a Monster Underneath, My Darling". The track was released on January 28 alongside a lyric video created by photographer and graphic designer Olivia Van Rye. The Body Never Lies was released on March 4 including 10 tracks. A music video for "Drive Away" was released on YouTube.

=== 2025–present: Return and PEAK ===
On the 15th anniversary of 6.8.10, after 3 years of inactivity, Krewella announced their new single "Crying On The Dancefloor" via Instagram. The song was released the following day on June 9. Their next single "Eternal" was released on November 12. They released "Without You" on January 26 2026, and on February 27 released "Moondance" with MERCY. MERCY. MERCY., an alias of I See Stars vocalist Devin Oliver. Following the releases of "Something Sacred" and "the blueprint", Krewella announced their fourth studio album "PEAK". The album was released on September 4th.

In October 2026, Yasmine debuted a new solo project under the name Yyousaf. The first single "Bodies In The Club" was released on October 30.

== Artistry ==
Krewella's musical style has been mainly described as EDM, dance-rock, and dance-pop. They have been influenced by a number of electronic subgenres, including progressive house, electro, dubstep, drum and bass, trap music and future bass. The band's name was an original idea from Jahan while writing lyrics, and is not a reference to Cruella de Vil.

== Members ==
- Jahan Yousaf – DJ, vocals, producer, writer (2007–present)
- Yasmine Yousaf – DJ, vocals, writer, producer, FX music controllers (2007–present)
- Kris Trindl – DJ, producer, FX music controllers (2007–2014)

Session/touring members

- Frank Zummo – drums, percussion (2015–2017)
- Max Bernstein – guitars, keyboards (2015–2017)

Timeline

== Discography ==
- Get Wet (2013)
- zer0 (2020)
- The Body Never Lies (2022)
- PEAK (2026)
