= Prince Fox =

American electronic music producer and DJ (born; 1992)

- Birth name: Samuel Lassner
- Born: November 25, 1992 (age 32); Manhattan, New York, U.S.
- Genres: Future bass; pop; deep house
- Occupations: DJ; musician
- Instruments: Digital audio workstation; guitar
- Years active: 2014–present
- Labels: Republic Records, Casablanca Records, Dimmak, Lowly Palace, independent
- Website: princefoxmusic.com

Samuel Lassner (born November 25, 1992), better known by his stage name Prince Fox or his alias SMWN is an American musician, DJ, songwriter and producer from Manhattan, New York. He gained notability after remixing songs for 3lau, Cazzette and SNBRN. He later caught the attention of Casablanca Records, a label owned by Universal Music Group and operated under Republic Records. He was then signed to Casablanca in 2015.

== Early life ==
Lassner began his career by playing guitar, inspired by John Mayer. He started producing electronic music when he first visited Electric Zoo, an electronic music festival. He began using the stage name "Prince Fox" from the book "The Little Prince" based on two characters -– a prince and a fox. However, prior to becoming known by his stage name, his close friends referred to him as Franklin, in reference to his resemblance to the cartoon turtle. He attends his classes at New York University's Steinhardt Music Technology program.

== Musical style ==
His music was described as "future pop". His biggest inspirations are John Mayer, Skrillex, and Chris Martin describing them as a "three-way tie".

== Career ==
His Musings EP was released in October 2015. “I Don’t Wanna Love You” was released as a single through Casablanca Records.

He released "Fragile", a collaboration with Hailee Steinfeld as a single. He lost his grandfather before the song was created. Lassner spoke of the collaboration, describing it as 'superstitious' fate. His late-grandfather and Steinfeld share the same birthday date (December 11). "Fragile" was first presented to Lassner by his songwriter-friend Lil Aaron. He then re-arranged it and produced with a style he calls "future pop". When he sent the song to Steinfeld before reworking the lyrics to fit her voice.

He later collaborated with Michelle Buzz to release "Oxygen", a single inspired by the death of his god-grandmother Shirley who died due to lung cancer. Lassner described the song as 'one of the most personal, near and dear songs he's worked on'.

== Discography ==
=== Studio albums ===
Title	Details
All This Music, Vol. 1	Released: May 31, 2019; Label: Dim Mak; Formats: Digital download

=== Extended plays ===
Title	Details
Musings	Released: October 9, 2015; Label: Self-released; Format: Digital download
Lafayette Room 408	Released: September 27, 2019; Label: Self-released; Format: Digital download
Better Days	Released: July 3, 2020; Label: Self-released; Format: Digital download

=== Singles ===
Title	Year	Peak chart positions	
Title	Year	US Dance	US Airplay
"I Don't Wanna Love You" (featuring Melody Noel)	2015	—	38
"Fragile" (featuring Hailee Steinfeld)	2016	35	—
"Oxygen" (featuring Michelle Buzz)	2016	—	—
"Just Call" (featuring Bella Thorne)	2017	1	—
"Five Months Later"	2019	—	—
"Tell Me" (featuring Ellise)	2019	—	—
"Not the One"	2019	—	—
"No Plans" (with Lena Leon)	2020	—	—
"Alone"	2020	—	—
"—" denotes a recording that did not chart or was not released in that territory.

=== Remixes ===
==== 2014 ====
- 3lau featuring Bright Lights – How You Love Me (Prince Fox Remix)
- Sam Smith – Stay With Me (Prince Fox Remix)
- Florence & The Machine – You've Got The Love (Prince Fox Remix)
- CAZZETTE – Blind Heart (Prince Fox Remix)

==== 2015 ====
- Kanye West – All Of The Lights (Prince Fox x Hotel Garuda Cover)
- Beyonce – Crazy In Love (Prince Fox Remix)
- Kimbra – Settle Down (Prince Fox Remix)
- SNBRN featuring Kerli – Raindrops (Prince Fox Remix)
- Prince Fox – Wait Until Tomorrow (Prince Fox VIP)
- DJ Khaled featuring Moonzz – All I Do Is Win (Prince Fox Cover)
- Felix Jaehn featuring Jasmine Thompson – Ain't Nobody (Loves Me Better) (Prince Fox Remix)
- Atlas Bound – Tell Me (Prince Fox Remix)

==== 2017 ====
- Hey Violet – Guys My Age (Prince Fox Remix)
- Prince Fox - Just Call (Prince Fox VIP)

==== 2019 ====
- Nikki Vianna and Matoma - When You Leave (Prince Fox Remix)

==== 2020 ====
- Krewella - Anxiety (Prince Fox Remix)
- Jaymes Young - Happiest Year (Prince Fox Remix)
