= Pegboard Nerds discography =

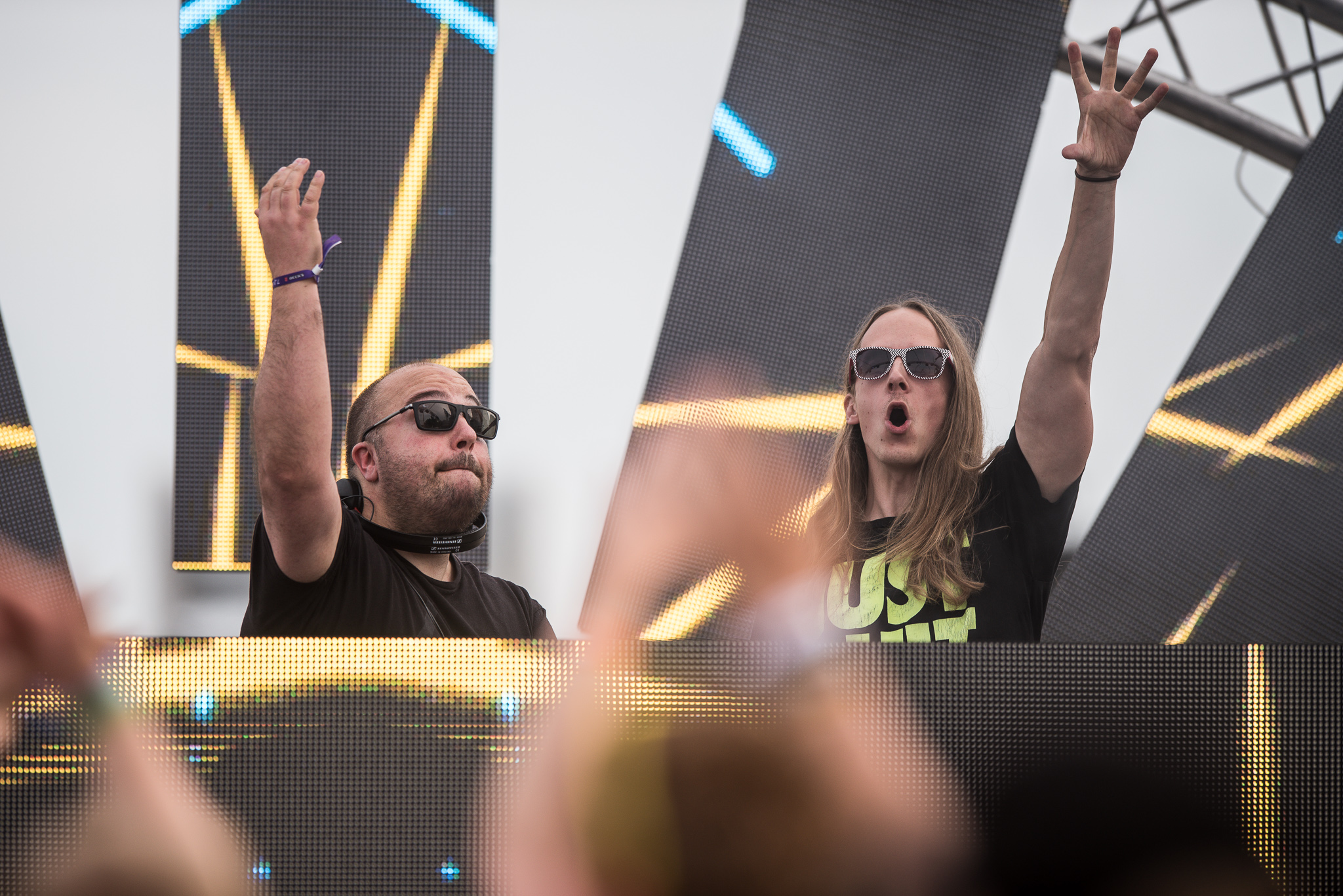
- Pegboard Nerds at Open Beatz 2016
- Studio albums: 14
- Singles: 43
- Remixes: 19
- Music videos: 5

This is the discography of electronic dance music producers and DJs Pegboard Nerds.

== Albums and extended plays ==
Title	Details
We Are One EP	Released: 1 February 2013; Label: Monstercat; Format: Digital download
Guilty Pleasures EP	Released: 24 June 2013; Label: Monstercat and Disciple Recordings; Format: Digital download
The Lost Tracks EP	Released: 30 August 2013; Label: Monstercat; Format: Digital download
High Roller (The Remixes)	Released: 25 November 2013; Label: Disciple Recordings; Format: Digital download
Bassline Kickin' (The Remixes)	Released: 19 February 2014; Label: Monstercat; Format: Digital download
The Uncaged Remixes	Released: 17 November 2014; Label: Monstercat; Format: Digital download
Bring the Madness (The Remixes)	Released: 23 March 2015; Label: Monstercat; Format: Digital download
Pink Cloud EP	Released: 21 October 2015; Label: Monstercat; Format: Digital download
Get On Up (The Remixes)	Released: 12 November 2015; Label: Monstercat; Format: Digital download
Pink Cloud (The Remixes)	Released: 20 January 2016; Label: Monstercat; Format: Digital download
Heartbit (The Remixes)	Released: 19 April 2016; Label: Monstercat; Format: Digital download
Nerds by Nature EP	Released: 13 January 2017; Label: Monstercat; Format: Digital download
Deep in the Night (The Remixes)	Released: 7 March 2017; Label: Monstercat; Format: Digital download
Nerds By Nature (The Remixes)	Released: 16 May 2017; Label: Monstercat; Format: Digital download
Full Hearts EP	Released: 27 July 2018; Label: Monstercat; Format: Digital download
Heart of the Universe EP	Released: 4 October 2019; Label: Monstercat; Format: Digital download

=== As featured artists ===
Title	Details
Alive By Krewella	Released: 5 February 2013; Label: Krewella Music LLC; Format: Digital download
Quiet Riot The Remixes By MSD and Jillian Ann	Released: 3 March 2013; Label: Prime Dub; Format: Digital download
Larva (Far Away) By Morten	Released: 27 March 2013; Label: disco:wax; Format: Digital download
Far Too Close (Remixes) By J.Views	Released: 18 June 2013; Label: Little Notes; Format: Digital download
Live for the Night (Remixes) By Krewella	Released: 4 November 2013; Label: Columbia Records; Format: Digital download
Evolution By I See MONSTAS	Released: 6 November 2013; Label: Polydor Records; Format: Digital download
Lucid Dreams (The Remixes) By Mat Zo	Released: 10 December 2013; Label: Anjunabeats; Format: Digital download
Maybe (Remixes) By Carmada	Released: 16 April 2015; Label: Owsla; Format: Digital download
Warriors (Remixes) By Nicky Romero and Volt & State	Released: 16 April 2015; Label: Owsla; Format: Digital download
Chemistry (The Remixes) By Virtual Riot	Released: 29 August 2016; Label: Disciple Recordings; Format: Digital download
Paris (Remixes) By The Chainsmokers	Released: 17 February 2017; Label: Disruptor Records; Format: Digital download
The Reworks By Pendulum	Released: 29 June 2018; Label: Earstorm; Format: Digital download

== Singles ==
Title	Year	Album	Label
Gunpoint	2012	Non-album singles	disco:wax
Ingen Anden Drøm (with Morten Breum)	2012	Non-album singles	Self-released
2012 (Det Derfor) (featuring Dice & Joey Moe)	2012	Non-album singles	disco:wax
Gunpoint (VIP Mix)	2012	Non-album singles	Monstercat
Revenge of the Nerds VIP	2012	The Lost Tracks	Monstercat
Disconnected	2012	Non-album singles	Monstercat
Pressure Cooker	2012	Non-album singles	Monstercat
Rocktronik	2012	The Lost Tracks	Monstercat
20K	2012	The Lost Tracks	Monstercat
Fire In The Hole	2012	Non-album singles	Monstercat
Self Destruct	2012	Non-album singles	Monstercat
We Are One (featuring Splitbreed)	2013	We Are One	Monstercat
High Roller (featuring Splitbreed)	2013	Guilty Pleasures	Monstercat
Razor Sharp (with Tristam)	2013	Non-album single	Monstercat
So What	2013	Guilty Pleasures	Monstercat
Razor Sharp VIP (with Tristam)	2013	Guilty Pleasures	Monstercat
Lawless	2013	The Lost Tracks	Monstercat
FrainBreeze	2013	The Lost Tracks	Monstercat
This Is Not The End (with Krewella)	2013	Get Wet	Monstercat
Coffins (with MisterWives)	2013	Non-album singles	Monstercat
Bassline Kickin'	2014	Non-album singles	Monstercat
Hero (featuring Elizaveta)	2014	Non-album singles	Monstercat
Here It Comes	2014	Non-album singles	Monstercat
New Style	2014	Non-album singles	Monstercat
BADBOI	2014	Non-album singles	Monstercat
Emergency	2014	Non-album singles	Monstercat
Bring The Madness (with Excision featuring Mayor Apeshit)	2015	Non-album singles	Monstercat
Try This	2015	Non-album singles	Monstercat
Get On Up (with Jauz)	2015	Non-album singles	Monstercat
Luigi's Mansion	2015	Non-album singles	Self-released
Emoji VIP	2015	Non-album singles	Monstercat
Bass Charmer (featuring JFMee)	2016	Non-album singles	Self-released
Heartbit (featuring Tia Simone)	2016	Non-album singles	Monstercat
All Alone (with Grabbitz)	2016	Non-album singles	Monstercat
Heartbit VIP (featuring Tia Simone)	2016	Heartbit (The Remixes)	Monstercat
Superstar (with Nghtmre featuring Krewella)	2016	Non-album singles	Monstercat
Weaponize (with Miu)	2016	Non-album singles	Monstercat
Blackout	2016	Monstercat 5 Year Anniversary, Nerds by Nature	Monstercat
Deep In The Night (with Snails)	2016	Non-album single	Monstercat
BAMF	2016	Nerds by Nature	Monstercat
Melodymania	2016	Nerds by Nature	Monstercat
Go Berzerk (with Quiet Disorder)	2017	Nerds by Nature	Monstercat
Voodoo (with Tony Junior)	2017	Non-album singles	Spinnin' Records
Move That Body (with Quiet Disorder)	2017	Non-album singles	Monstercat
Extraordinary (with Spyker featuring Elizaveta)	2017	Non-album singles	Monstercat
Heaven Let Us Down (featuring Koda)	2017	Non-album singles	Monstercat
Another Round (featuring Krewella)	2017	Non-album singles	Self-released
Just Dance (featuring Tia Simone)	2017	Non-album singles	Monstercat
Disconnected VIP (featuring Desirée Dawson)	2017	Non-album singles	Monstercat
Supersonic (featuring Chimeric)	2018	Non-album singles	Monstercat
Troll (with RaceCarBed)	2018	Non-album singles	Disciple
Bring Me Joy (with Lug00ber)	2018	Non-album singles	Monstercat
Party Freaks (featuring Anna Yvette)	2018	Rocket League x Monstercat Vol. 2	Monstercat
WotS (with More Plastic)	2018	Non-album single	Disciple
Purple People Eater	2018	Full Hearts EP	Monstercat
Escape (with Dion Timmer)	2018	Full Hearts EP	Monstercat
Harpoon (with Knife Party)	2018	Full Hearts EP	Monstercat
Gunslinga (featuring MC Mota)	2019	Non-album singles	Monstercat
Back To Me	2019	Non-album singles	Monstercat
Moshi (with Tokyo Machine)	2019	Non-album singles	Monstercat
Give a Little Love	2019	Beat Saber (Original Game Soundtrack), Vol. III	Beat Games
Exterminate	2019	Heart of the Universe	Monstercat
Solo (featuring Maria Lynn)	2019	Heart of the Universe	Monstercat
Computa Hakka (featuring Ragga Twins)	2019	Heart of the Universe	Monstercat
Crying Shame (featuring Nervo)	2019	Heart of the Universe	Monstercat
Rhythm Is A Dancer (featuring Tia Simone)	2020	Non-album singles	Monstercat
Manifest / Together (with More Plastic)	2020	Non-album singles	Monstercat
Shaku (2012)	2021	Monstercat - 10 Year Anniversary	Monstercat
Falling Apart (with Stonebank & EMEL)	2021	Non-album singles	Monstercat
The Ride (with More Plastic)	2021	Non-album singles	Monstercat
Murda (with More Plastic)	2021	Non-album singles	Monstercat
Million Reasons (featuring Gunnva)	2021	Non-album singles	Monstercat
Be Free (with Ahee)	2021	Non-album singles	Dharma
Shine (with Sophon)	2022	Non-album singles	Monstercat
Multiverse (with Robin Vane)	2022	Non-album singles	Monstercat
Come Together (with Sophon)	2022	Non-album singles	Nordic Breakbeat Conspiracy
Jack	2022	Non-album singles	Nerd Nation Records
Welcome To The Club (with Stonebank)	2022	Non-album singles	Nerd Nation Records
Cheat Code (with Redless)	2022	Non-album singles	Monstercat
Higher (with Sophon)	2022	Non-album singles	Nerd Nation Records
Bad Luck (with Kiz Keyz)	2022	Non-album singles	Monstercat
Dream On (with Just Lennie)	2022	Non-album singles	Nerd Nation Records
Falling Apart (VIP) (with Stonebank & EMEL)	2022	Non-album singles	Monstercat
Powerplay (with Bossfight)	2023	Non-album singles	Monstercat
Euphoria (with Stonebank)	2023	Non-album singles	Monstercat
Stardust (with Sophon)	2023	Non-album singles	Nerd Nation Records
Uplift	2023	Non-album singles	Monstercat

== Covers ==
- The Grid – Swamp Thing (2015, Monstercat)
- Snap! – Rhythm Is A Dancer (with Tia Simone) (2020, Monstercat)

== Remixes ==
Title	Year	Artist	Label
Make It Bun Dem	2012	Skrillex and Damian Marley	Owsla
Quiet Riot	2012	MSD and Jillian Ann	Prime Dub
Motion Picture	2012	Blake McGrath	Tasty
Alive	2012	Krewella	Krewella Music LLC
Live For the Night	2013	Krewella	Columbia Records
Larva (Far Away)	2013	Morten	disco:wax
Lucid Dreams	2013	Mat Zo	Anjunabeats
Far Too Close	2013	J.Viewz	Little Notes
Evolution	2013	I See MONSTAS	Polydor Records
Don't Shake	2013	Kairo Kingdom	Tasty
Wonder	2014	Adventure Club (featuring The Kite String Tangle)	Self Released
Hero	2014	Elizaveta	Monstercat
Emergency	2014	Nothing But Thieves	Monstercat
Coffins	2014	Misterwives	Monstercat
Maybe	2015	Carmada	OWSLA
Warriors	2015	Nicky Romero vs Volt and State	Protocol Recordings
Swamp Thing	2015	The Grid	Monstercat
Juices	2016	Virtual Riot and Dubloadz	Disciple
Paris	2017	The Chainsmokers	Disruptor Records
The Imperial March	2018	Celldweller	Self-released
Witchcraft	2018	Pendulum	Earstorm
Rattlesnake	2020	Rogue	Monstercat

== Music videos ==
Title	Year	Director
"Pink Cloud" (featuring Max Collins)	2015	Teemu Erämaa
"Swamp Thing"	2015	—N/a
"Emoji VIP"	2015	Patrick Jean
"Superstar" (with NGHTMRE) (featuring Krewella)	2016	Anthony Sylvester
"Speed of Light" (Andy C Remix)	2017	Patrick Jean
"Harpoon"	2018	Patrick Jean
