= Catullus 85 =

Poem by Catullus

Catullus 85 is a poem by the Roman poet Catullus for his lover Lesbia, to whom he wrote some 25. Its declaration of conflicting feelings is renowned for its drama, force and brevity. The meter of the poem is the elegiac couplet.

== Text ==
Ōdī et amō. Quārē id faciam fortasse requīris.
Nesciŏ, sed fierī sentiō et excrucior.

I hate and I love. Why I do this, perhaps you ask.
I know not, but I feel it happening and I am tortured.

–  u  u /  –   –  /   –   u u / –   –  /  –  u  u /   – –
Ōd'et a / mō. Quā / r'id faci / am for / tasse re / quīris.
 
 – u u  /  –  u u /  – /  –   u  u  / –   u  u  / –
Nesciŏ, / sed fie / rī / sen ti' et / ex cru ci / or.[4]

The traditional translation of the first line has been questioned, however, and it is argued that an alternative rendering of the start might be "I loathe and lust", which offers a more psychologically nuanced reading of the poem. It has further been advanced that the proper meaning of quare is not 'why' but 'how', as some earlier translators have rendered it. That question is then answered in the final word of the poem, excrucior, 'I am on the rack, I am being pulled two ways at once'.

== Musical settings ==
How a conjectural musical accompaniment might have sounded in the time of Catullus has been recreated by Mary Ann Tedstone Glover, but the earliest setting of the Latin words is the six-part madrigal by Jacobus Gallus at the end of the 16th century.

Other settings date from the 20th century onwards, often as part of a composite work including other poems by Catullus. They include the Catulli Carmina (1941-3) by Carl Orff; "I Hate and I Love" (1981), an English-language cantata for mixed chorus and percussion by Dominick Argento; "Two Catullus Songs" (1999) by Carson P. Cooman; "3 Latin Poems by Catullus" for voice and piano (2008) by Ronald Beckett; Carmina Catulli, for baritone and piano (2014) by Michael Linton (b. 1952); and "Odi et Amo: Eight Songs of Catullus" (2018) by Daniel Castellanos; There have also been two separate choral settings of the Latin text, by Mark Templeton (2014), and by Aaron Gage (2023).

In addition, there have been several arrangements for popular performance: as "I Hate and I Love" on the 1992 Slovenian Videosex album Ljubi in sovraži; by the Latvian Uģis Prauliņš as a rock oratorio for boys' choir (1999); as "Odi et amo" for string quintet and taped vocal by Icelander Jóhann Jóhannsson on his 2002 album Englabörn; as "Odi et amo" by Elizaveta Khripounova for the album Beatrix Runs (2012); and incorporated into "Wrecking Ball" by Eric Whitacre, performed live and recorded at the 2014 iTunes Festival in London.
