= Pedes (r/The Donald) =

Political Internet slang term

Pede (shortened of Centipede) is a slang term used by Trump supporters online as an in-group identifier among supporters, similar in social role to political solidarity terms as 'comrade'. The term originated and was popularized from /pol/ on 4chan and r/The_Donald on Reddit during the 2016 Presidential election.

== Background ==
r/The_Donald was a subreddit created in 2015 to support Donald Trump's 2016 Presidential campaign.

On October 13, 2015 Trump re-posted a video titled 'You can't stump The Trump', that consisted of highlights during The Republican debate with the song 'Centipede', a song by Australian electronic group 'Knife Party' playing. The term 'Pede' was derived from the title of the song, and it quickly spread
