= Harpoon (Knife Party and Pegboard Nerds song) =

2018 electro house single

Single by Knife Party and Pegboard Nerds

from the EP Full Hearts
- Released: 26 July 2018
- Genre: Electro house
- Length: 5:52
- Label: Monstercat
- Songwriter(s): Rob Swire; Gareth McGrillen; Alexander Odden; Michael Parsberg
- Producer(s): Rob Swire; Gareth McGrillen; Alexander Odden; Michael Parsberg

Knife Party singles chronology
"Battle Sirens" (2016)	"Harpoon" (2018)	"Lost Souls" (2019)

Pegboard Nerds singles chronology
"Escape" (2018)	"Harpoon" (2018)	"Steel" (2018)

Music video
- "Harpoon" on YouTube

"Harpoon" is a song by Australian electronic music duo Knife Party and Danish-Norwegian electronic music group Pegboard Nerds. Canadian record label Monstercat released it on 26 July 2018 as the first single from Pegboard Nerds' sixth EP, Full Hearts.

== Background and release ==
Alexander Odden and Michael Parsberg of Pegboard Nerds initially sent a concept for the collaboration to Rob Swire and Gareth McGrillen of Knife Party, which Swire immediately recorded vocals for. Odden and Parsberg liked the vocals and flew to London for a week to work on the collaboration with Swire and McGrillen in the latter's studio. The song title comes from the main melody used in the song, which Odden and Parsberg described as a harp or middle eastern instrument. Odden briefly saved the melody as "Superharp", though he disliked the name and changed it to "Harpoon".

On 9 May 2018, Swire announced a collaboration between Knife Party and Pegboard Nerds. In a Twitter post, Swire wrote that Odden and Parsberg "reminded me that house music is better when you use cool synths, and I taught them that dubstep just leads to ass-eating competitions." Odden and Parsberg debuted the song at Dreamhack Austin 2018, featuring Swire's pitched-up vocals.

It was the fourth and last song to be released as part of #NERDWEEK, after the previous release "Escape", a collaboration between Pegboard Nerds and Dutch electronic music producer Dion Timmer. The song was released as part of Pegboard Nerd's sixth extended play titled Full Hearts released on 27 July 2018. It was the first track on the EP, which also includes four other songs.

== Critical reception ==
Your EDM's Matthew Meadow called the song one of the "biggest electro songs of the year" and one of Monstercat's "biggest tracks this year." Maria Clinton of EDM Identity wrote that the lyrics lead into "a fantastic voyage full of quirky Pegboard Nerds character and a drop that reads Knife Party all over it. Writing for Run The Trap, Omar Serrano described Knife Party and Pegboard Nerds as two of "dance music's most revered acts", writing that the song was a "heart-pounding single boasts a boisterous and uplifting build that gives way to a piercing Electro drop that provides the unrelenting tune with its fast pace energy." Jake Gable of We Rave You described the song as "synth-focused music that would look at home in a 90’s inspired video game."

== Track listing ==
Digital download
No.	Title	Length
1.	"Harpoon"	5:52
Total length:		5:52

== Release history ==
Region	Date	Format	Version	Label	Ref.
Worldwide	26 July 2018	Digital download	"Harpoon" - Single	Monstercat	
Worldwide	27 July 2018	Digital download	Full Hearts	Monstercat	
