= Desirée Dawson =

Canadian singer-songwriter

- Born: Vancouver
- Origin: White Rock, British Columbia, Canada
- Years active: 2016–present

Desirée Dawson is a Canadian singer, songwriter and baritone ukulele player, from White Rock, British Columbia. She is best known as the winner of CBC Music's Searchlight talent contest in 2016.

Following her Searchlight win Dawson performed at the CBC Music Festival, and released her debut solo album Wild Heart in 2017.

Dawson has also appeared as a guest vocalist on the Pegboard Nerds' Nerds by Nature EP and their single "Disconnected VIP", and on Kicks N Licks' single "Sunny Day".

In 2020, Dawson appeared on Paul Chin's EP Full Spectrum, performing the lead single "Take It or Leave It", written at a songwriting camp held by Babyface.

Her 2021 EP, Meet You at the Light, was a Juno Award nominee for Adult Contemporary Album of the Year at the Juno Awards of 2022. In the same year, Alexander Farah's music video for the EP's title track won the Music Video Competition Jury Award at SXSW.

== Discography ==
=== Guest appearances ===
Title	Year	Other artist(s)	Album
"With You"	2017	Sun-El Musician	Africa to the World
