= Internet Friends =

Song by Knife Party

from the album 100% No Modern Talking
- Released: 12 December 2011
- Genre: Electro house; dubstep
- Length: 5:01
- Label: Earstorm
- Songwriter(s): Rob Swire, Gareth McGrillen
- Producer(s): Knife Party

"Internet Friends" is a song by Australian electro house duo Knife Party. It was released in 2011 as the first single from the Knife Party EP, 100% No Modern Talking by Knife Party members, Rob Swire and Gareth McGrillen. The song entered the UK Singles Chart at number 89 due to strong sales, despite being initially available for free download. The song was featured on the fifth season of The Walking Dead. In 2013, a "VIP" remix of the song was featured on the Knife Party EP, Haunted House.

== Charts ==
Chart (2011–2012)	Peak position
Belgium (Ultratop 50 Flanders)	106
UK Singles (OCC)	89
UK Dance (OCC)	9

== Certifications ==
Region	Certification	Certified units/sales
United Kingdom (BPI)	Silver	200,000^{‡}
^{‡} Sales+streaming figures based on certification alone.
