= Trigger Warning (EP) =

EP by Knife Party
- Released: 20 November 2015
- Genre: Electro house
- Labels: Earstorm, Big Beat
- Producers: Rob Swire; Gareth McGrillen; Jauz; Tom Staar

Knife Party chronology
Abandon Ship (2014)	Trigger Warning (2015)

Trigger Warning is the fourth EP by the Australian electronic music duo Knife Party, released on 20 November 2015 by Earstorm Records and Big Beat. It is Knife Party's first EP since the release of their Haunted House EP in 2013.

== Track listing ==
No.	Title	Length
1.	"PLUR Police"	4:05
2.	"Parliament Funk"	4:20
3.	"Kraken" (with Tom Staar)	4:50
4.	"PLUR Police" (Jauz Remix)	3:45
Total length:		17:00
