= Nghtmre (EP) =

EP by Nghtmre
- Released: 25 March 2016
- Recorded: 2015–16
- Genre: Trap
- Length: 22:23
- Label: Mad Decent
- Producer: Tyler Marenyi

Nghtmre (stylized as NGHTMRE) is the self-titled debut EP by American DJ Nghtmre.

== Track listing ==
NGHTMRE
| No. | Title | Length |
|---|---|---|
| 1. | "Prelude" | 1:41 |
| 2. | "Burn Out" | 3:49 |
| 3. | "Get Back" (Instrumental) | 3:45 |
| 4. | "Hold Me Close" | 3:01 |
| 5. | "Touch" | 3:21 |
| 6. | "Holdin' on to Me" | 4:00 |
| Total length: | | 22:23 |

== Charts ==
| Chart (2016) | Peak position |
|---|---|
| US Top Dance/Electronic Albums (Billboard) | 17 |
