= Rage Valley =

2012 EP by Knife Party

EP by Knife Party
- Released: 27 May 2012
- Recorded: 2010
- Genres: Dubstep; electro house; drumstep
- Length: 18:10
- Labels: Earstorm, Big Beat
- Producers: Rob Swire, Gareth McGrillen

Knife Party chronology
100% No Modern Talking (2011)	Rage Valley (2012)	Haunted House (2013)

Professional ratings
Review scores
Source	Rating
Allmusic	3.5/5 stars

Rage Valley is the second EP by the Australian electro house duo Knife Party. It was released 27 May 2012 on Beatport and on 3 June 2012 on iTunes. The title track was originally named "Fuck Em" but was changed for what Knife Party described as "secret shady" reasons. Originally Rage Valley was set to be released before the end of April, but due to multiple setbacks the release was delayed for four weeks. A music video for "Centipede" was released on 8 August 2012. An edited version of the track "Bonfire" was featured in the episode "Fifty-One" of Breaking Bad and the video game WWE 2K15, and "Centipede" was featured in the fourth episode of the BBC comedy series The Wrong Mans.

== Track listing ==
No.	Title	Length
1.	"Rage Valley"	4:59
2.	"Centipede"	4:06
3.	"Bonfire"	4:32
4.	"Sleaze" (feat. MistaJam)	4:33
Total length:		18:10
