= The Atlas Underground =

Studio album by Tom Morello
- Released: October 12, 2018
- Recorded: 2018
- Length: 44:35
- Label: Mom + Pop Music

Tom Morello chronology
World Wide Rebel Songs (2011)	The Atlas Underground (2018)	The Atlas Underground Fire (2021)

The Atlas Underground is the fourth studio album by American rock musician Tom Morello and the first one released uniquely under his own name. The album was released on October 12, 2018, by Mom + Pop Music. The album features guest appearances from Knife Party, Bassnectar, Big Boi, Killer Mike, Portugal. The Man, Whethan, Vic Mensa, Marcus Mumford, Steve Aoki, Tim McIlrath, K.Flay, Pretty Lights, Carl Restivo, Gary Clark Jr., Nico Stadi, Leikeli47, GZA, RZA and Herobust.

== Critical reception ==
Professional ratings
Aggregate scores
Source	Rating
Metacritic	63/100
Review scores
Source	Rating
AllMusic	4/5 stars
NME	3/5 stars
Rolling Stone	3/5 stars

The Atlas Underground received generally positive reviews from critics. At Metacritic, which assigns a normalized rating out of 100 to reviews from mainstream publications, the album received an average score of 63, based on 9 reviews.

== Track listing ==
No.	Title	Writer(s)	Producer(s)	Length
1.	"Battle Sirens" (Knife Party featuring Tom Morello)	Tom Morello; Gareth McGrillen; Rob Swire	Swire; McGrillen	4:03
2.	"Rabbit's Revenge" (featuring Bassnectar, Big Boi, and Killer Mike)	Morello; Lorin Ashton; Antwan Andre Patton; Michael Render; Shelton E. Oliver	Bassnectar	2:59
3.	"Every Step That I Take" (featuring Portugal. The Man and Whethan)	Morello; Matt Shultz; Ethan Snoreck; Matthan Minster	Whethan; Dave Sitek (co.); Casey Bates (v.)	3:42
4.	"We Don't Need You" (featuring Vic Mensa)	Morello; Victor Mensah	Tom Morello; Boots	3:03
5.	"Find Another Way" (featuring Marcus Mumford)	Morello; Marcus Mumford; Josh Carter	Josh Carter	4:38
6.	"How Long" (featuring Steve Aoki and Tim McIlrath)	Morello; Steve Aoki; Tim McIlrath	Steve Aoki	4:23
7.	"Lucky One" (featuring K.Flay)	Morello; Kristine Flaherty; Carl Restivo	Carl Restivo	3:32
8.	"One Nation" (featuring Pretty Lights)	Morello; Derek Smith	Pretty Lights	4:15
9.	"Vigilante Nocturno" (featuring Carl Restivo)	Morello; Restivo	Restivo	3:29
10.	"Where It's At Ain't What It Is" (featuring Gary Clark Jr. and Nico Stadi)	Morello; Gary Clark Jr.; Nico Hartikainen	Nico Stadi	3:38
11.	"Roadrunner" (featuring Leikeli47)	Morello; Hasben Jones; Harry Rodrigues	Harry Bauer Rodrigues	2:48
12.	"Lead Poisoning" (featuring GZA, RZA and Herobust)	Morello; Gary Grice; Robert Fitzgerald Diggs; Hayden Kramer	Herobust	4:05
Total length:				44:35

== Personnel ==
- Tom Morello – guitars, bass (5, 8, 11), vocals (9, 12)

Musicians

- Big Boi – vocals (2)
- Gary Clark Jr. – guitar, vocals (10)
- Eric Gardner – drums (7, 12)
- Dave Gibbs – bass (1, 9, 12)
- John Gourley – vocals (3)
- GZA – vocals (12)
- K.Flay – vocals (7)
- Leikeli47 – vocals (11)
- Killer Mike – vocals (2)
- Tim McIlrath – vocals (6)
- Vic Mensa – vocals (4)
- Miguel – backing vocals (5)
- Marcus Mumford – vocals (5)
- Carl Restivo – vocals (9, 12), drums (9), synthesizers (7, 9), additional guitar (1, 9, 12), MPC (4), backing vocals (5)
- RZA – vocals (12)

Technical personnel

- Tom Morello – executive producer
- Will Anspach – vocal engineer (4)
- Steve Aoki – mixing (6)
- Neal Avron – mixing (5)
- Bassnectar – mixing (2)
- Andrew Berlin – additional engineering (6)
- Lisa Boldyreva – additional engineering (3)
- Billy Joe Bowers – mastering
- Mark Brown – vocal engineer (5)
- Dave Cerminara – additional engineering (3)
- Greg Collins – guitar engineer (6)
- Scott Desmarais – assistant mix engineer (3, 4)
- Kristine Flaherty – vocal engineer (7)
- Robin Florent – assistant mix engineer (3, 4)
- Chris Galland – mix engineer (3, 4)
- Blake Hansen – mixing (8)
- Kevin Harp – guitar engineer (2)
- Herobust – mixing (12)
- Tony Maserati – mixing (7)
- Manny Marroquin – mixing (3, 4)
- Kevin Mills – engineer (10), guitar engineer (1, 9, 12), bass guitar engineer (9, 12), drum engineer (12)
- Gerardo "Jerry" Ordonez – additional engineering (3)
- Pretty Lights – mixing (8)
- Renegade El Rey – vocal engineer (2)
- Aaron Renner – vocal engineer (11)
- Carl Restivo – production supervisor, engineer (4, 5, 7, 9, 11), vocal engineer (12), editing (3), additional guitar engineer (3)
- Tyler Scott – assistant mix engineer (7)
- Scott Skrzynski – assistant mix engineer (5)
- Derek Smith – engineer (8)
- Nico Stadi – mixing (10)
- Bill Stevenson – vocal engineer (6)
- Rob Swire – mixing (1)

== Charts ==
Chart (2018)	Peak position
Australian Albums (ARIA)	90
Scottish Albums (OCC)	64
US Billboard 200	141
