= Abandon Ship (Knife Party album) =

Studio album by Knife Party
- Released: 24 November 2014
- Recorded: September 2013 – July 2014
- Genres: Electro house; house; deep house; drumstep
- Length: 55:36
- Labels: Earstorm, Big Beat, Warner Bros.
- Producers: Rob Swire, Gareth McGrillen

Knife Party chronology
Haunted House (2013)	Abandon Ship (2014)	Trigger Warning (2015)

Singles from Abandon Ship
- 1. "Resistance" Released: 31 August 2014; 2. "Begin Again" Released: 23 September 2014; 3. "Boss Mode" Released: 27 September 2014

Abandon Ship is the debut studio album by the Australian electronic dance music duo Knife Party, released on 24 November 2014 by Earstorm Records, Big Beat Records and Warner Bros. Records. Its release in stores was postponed from the initial 27 October 2014 release date to 24 November. However, on 7 November 2014, iTunes Store released the album early, and the early release has been acknowledged by Knife Party themselves.

== Recording ==
Work on Knife Party's debut album started in September 2013, after the conclusion of their previous tour. By 4 June 2014, progress on Abandon Ship had reached a completion of nine tracks out of a desired twelve for release, with "five [tracks] in the "maybe" pile and five in the "ideas" stage". The album entered its mastering stage in July 2014.

== Promotion ==
The title of the album, Abandon Ship, was unveiled on 8 June 2014 by Knife Party through a post on social networking service Twitter, which was illustrated with the image of President Calvin Coolidge tipping his hat. Knife Party appeared at the 2014 Electric Daisy Carnival in Las Vegas, Nevada on 20 June 2014 for the first show of the duo's Festival Tour during mid 2014. Their 70-minute set at EDC, which included new tracks from Abandon Ship in both demo and studio form, was streamed live over the internet. On 6 August 2014, Rob Swire released a teaser for the track "Boss Mode", from the forthcoming album. "Resistance" was released for free on 25 August 2014, also available for sale and supported by BBC Radio 1Xtra DJs including MistaJam. On 22 August 2014, the album was formally announced on Twitter, and is scheduled for release on 10 November 2014. "Begin Again" was released as the album's second instant grat on 22 September 2014, entering the UK Singles Chart at number 183. The song received widespread airplay from BBC Radio 1 DJs, including Zane Lowe and Greg James.

In a series of tweets on 11 October 2014, shortly after it was announced that the album release date had been pushed back by 2 weeks for reasons out of Knife Party's control, Swire spoke up about the decision to make the album; "So close to finishing this thing. Can't believe it. Before we embarked on this thing, some people in our sphere of influence told us "don't bother, just release your previous EPs as an album. EDM is dead, you should just release all your old material on one CD, fulfill the contract and then do something with Pendulum." I realised that if an artist I liked released an album of old tunes, I'd be pissed off. So we wrote 12 from scratch, and it took forever. But I'm so glad we did it. Even if it turns out they were right and no one buys it and we have to sell organs for food."

== Track listing ==
All songs written and produced by Rob Swire and Gareth McGrillen. "Superstar" co-written by and featuring vocals by Bryn Christopher of I See MONSTAS. "EDM Trend Machine" co-written by Richard Boardman and Simon Aldred.

No.	Title	Length
1.	"Reconnect"	1:38
2.	"Resistance"	5:13
3.	"Boss Mode" (featuring Raja Kumari)	3:47
4.	"EDM Trend Machine" (featuring Simon Aldred)	5:05
5.	"404"	4:58
6.	"Begin Again"	5:55
7.	"Give It Up" (featuring Mr Vegas)	4:11
8.	"D.I.M.H." (featuring BETSY)	5:46
9.	"Micropenis"	5:32
10.	"Superstar" (featuring Skaar)	4:15
11.	"Red Dawn"	6:07
12.	"Kaleidoscope"	4:00

== Reception ==
Professional ratings
Review scores
Source	Rating
Allmusic	3.5/5 stars

Abandon Ship received mixed to positive reviews from music critics. Andy Belt of We Got This Covered gave it 3 out of 5 stars, saying "Knife Party’s debut album will rouse you and get you in the mood to celebrate, at least for its thunderous first half. Its best tracks are Begin Again, Boss Mode, Reconnect, D.I.M.H., and Kaleidoscope- these tracks utilize not only EDM but also house, space and/or dubstep."

== Charts ==
Chart (2014)	Peak position
Australian Albums (ARIA)	20
New Zealand Albums (RMNZ)	30
Scottish Albums (Official Charts)	35
UK Albums (Official Charts)	39
UK Dance Albums (Official Charts)	8
US Billboard 200	54
US Top Dance Albums (Billboard)	2

== Release history ==
Region	Date	Format	Label
United Kingdom	8 November 2014	CD, vinyl, digital download	Earstorm; Big Beat; Warner Bros.
Australia	8 November 2014	CD, vinyl, digital download	Earstorm; Big Beat; Warner Bros.
New Zealand	8 November 2014	CD, vinyl, digital download	Earstorm; Big Beat; Warner Bros.
United States	8 November 2014	CD, vinyl, digital download	Earstorm; Big Beat; Warner Bros.
Canada	8 November 2014	CD, vinyl, digital download	Earstorm; Big Beat; Warner Bros.
