= 100% No Modern Talking =

2011 EP by Knife Party

EP by Knife Party
- Released: 12 December 2011
- Genre: Dubstep; electro house
- Length: 19:12
- Label: Earstorm
- Producer: Rob Swire, Gareth McGrillen

Knife Party chronology
100% No Modern Talking (2011)	Rage Valley (2012)

Singles from 100% No Modern Talking
- 1. "Internet Friends" Released: 12 December 2011

100% No Modern Talking is the debut EP by Australian electro house duo Knife Party. It was released 12 December 2011 as a free download on their website, Facebook, and SoundCloud, as well as being available for purchase on Beatport and iTunes. The EP originally was to feature "Back to the Z-List", but was replaced with "Destroy Them with Lazers" as Knife Party no longer liked their first choice. The album title refers to the "Modern Talking" wavetable in the software synthesizer Massive by Native Instruments, which creates the "talking" sound featured in popular dubstep tracks. Rob Swire has described it as "the Comic Sans of dubstep sounds".

== Track listing ==
No.	Title	Length
1.	"Internet Friends"	5:01
2.	"Destroy Them with Lazers"	4:56
3.	"Tourniquet"	5:17
4.	"Fire Hive"	4:38
Total length:		19:52

Alternate track listing
No.	Title	Length
1.	"Internet Friends"	5:01
2.	"Fire Hive"	4:39
3.	"Tourniquet"	5:18
4.	"Destroy Them with Lazers"	4:56
Total length:		19:54

== Charts ==
Chart (2012)	Peak position
Australia (ARIA)	31
