= Serbia Strong =

1993 song and Internet meme

"Karadžić, Lead Your Serbs"
- Trumpeter Nenad Tintor and the unidentified accordionist in the music video

Song by: Željko Grmuša; Slobodan Vrga; Nenad Tintor
- Language: Serbian
- Recorded: 1993 or 1995
- Genre: Turbo-folk
- Length: 3:38
- Songwriters: Željko Grmuša; Slobodan Vrga

Serbia Strong is a nickname given to a Serbian nationalist, anti-Croat, and anti-Muslim propaganda music video from the Yugoslav Wars. The song has spread globally as an internet meme, including amongst far-right groups and the alt-right.

The song was originally called "Karadžić, Lead Your Serbs" (Note: Serbian: Караџићу, води Србе своје, romanized: Karadžiću, vodi Srbe svoje, pronounced [kâradʒitɕu vǒdi sr̩̂be svǒje].) in reference to the wartime Bosnian Serb political leader and convicted war criminal Radovan Karadžić. It is also known as "God Is a Serb and He Will Protect Us" (Note: Serbian: Бог је Србин и он ће нас чувати, romanized: Bog je Srbin i on će nas čuvati, pronounced [bôːɡ je sr̩̂bin i ôːn tɕe nas tʃǔːvati]. Sometimes simply abbreviated to "God Is a Serb" (Serbian: Бог је Србин, romanized: Bog je Srbin, pronounced [bôːɡ je sr̩̂bin]).) and "Remove Kebab".

== Background ==
The song was recorded near Knin along the road to Plavno during the Yugoslav Wars. Lead singer Željko Grmuša stated that the track was composed in 1993 to boost the morale of Serb forces, while other participant accounts date the recording to 1995. In the video of the song, the tune is performed by four men in Serb paramilitary uniforms at an outdoor location with hilly terrain in the background. An edited version of the video uploaded to YouTube in August 2008 by Croatian documentary filmmaker Pavle Vranjican incorporated footage of captured Bosnian Muslim prisoners in Serb-run internment camps and the ICTY trial of Karadžić as a critical parody of the original propaganda. That upload also prefixed an interview clip of convicted war criminal Nikola Jorgić quoting Karadžić as saying "God is a Serb and he will protect us", which led internet users to mistakenly adopt the phrase as the song's title.

The lyrics threaten opponents with lines such as "The wolves are coming, beware, Ustaše and Turks". Derogatory terms are used throughout the song, including "Ustaše" in reference to ultranationalist and fascist Croat fighters, "Turks" for Bosniaks, and "balijas", an Ottoman-era ethnic slur directed against Bosnian Muslims. The lyrics warn that Serbs, under Karadžić's leadership, were coming for them.

The song's content celebrates Serb fighters and Karadžić, who was found guilty on 24 March 2016 of genocide against Bosnian Muslims and crimes against humanity during the Bosnian War. Karadžić was convicted of "persecution, extermination, deportation, forcible transfer, and murder in connection with his campaign to drive Bosnian Muslims and Croats out of villages claimed by Serb forces". On 20 March 2019, his appeal was rejected and his 40-year sentence was increased to life imprisonment. During the Bosnian War, the song served as a marching anthem for nationalist Serb paramilitaries (revived "Chetniks"), and later became known among the alt-right and other ultranationalist groups as "Remove Kebab".

== Lyrics ==
Serbian Cyrillic

Од Бихаћа до Петровца села, до Петровца села
Српска земља нападнута цијела, нападнута цијела
Караџићу, води Србе своје, води Србе своје
Нек' се види: никог се не боје, никог се не боје!

Ој, балије, хрватске усташе, хрватске усташе
Не дирајте ви огњиште наше, ви огњиште наше
Караџићу, води Србе своје, води Србе своје
Нек' се види: никог се не боје, никог се не боје!

Из Крајине кренули су вуци, кренули су вуци
Чувајте се, усташе и Турци, усташе и Турци
Караџићу, води Србе своје, води Србе своје
Нек' се види: никог се не боје, никог се не боје!

У одбрани свога српског рода, свога српског рода
Боримо се, драга нам слобода, драга нам слобода
Караџићу, води Србе своје, води Србе своје
Нек' се види: никог се не боје, никог се не боје! (x2)

Serbian Latin

Od Bihaća do Petrovca sela, do Petrovca sela
Srpska zemlja napadnuta cijela, napadnuta cijela
Karadžiću, vodi Srbe svoje, vodi Srbe svoje
Nek' se vidi: nikog se ne boje, nikog se ne boje!

Oj, balije, hrvatske ustaše, hrvatske ustaše
Ne dirajte vi ognjište naše, vi ognjište naše
Karadžiću, vodi Srbe svoje, vodi Srbe svoje
Nek' se vidi: nikog se ne boje, nikog se ne boje!

Iz Krajine krenuli su vuci, krenuli su vuci
Čuvajte se, ustaše i Turci, ustaše i Turci
Karadžiću, vodi Srbe svoje, vodi Srbe svoje
Nek' se vidi: nikog se ne boje, nikog se ne boje!

U odbrani svoga srpskog roda, svoga srpskog roda
Borimo se, draga nam sloboda, draga nam sloboda
Karadžiću, vodi Srbe svoje, vodi Srbe svoje
Nek' se vidi: nikog se ne boje, nikog se ne boje! (x2)

English translation

From Bihać to the village of Petrovac, to the village of Petrovac
The Serbian land is entirely attacked, is entirely attacked
Karadžić, lead your Serbs, lead your Serbs
Let it be shown: they fear no one, they fear no one!

Oh, balijas, Croatian Ustaše, Croatian Ustaše
Do not touch our hearth, our hearth
Karadžić, lead your Serbs, lead your Serbs
Let it be shown: they fear no one, they fear no one!

From Krajina, the wolves have set off, the wolves have set off
Beware, Ustaše and Turks, Ustaše and Turks
Karadžić, lead your Serbs, lead your Serbs
Let it be shown: they fear no one, they fear no one!

In the defence of our Serbian kin, our Serbian kin
We fight, for our dear freedom, for our dear freedom
Karadžić, lead your Serbs, lead your Serbs
Let it be shown: they fear no one, they fear no one! (x2)

== Internet popularity ==
Between 2006 and 2008, numerous edits of the video were posted on the internet. Throughout the 2000s, the video was mocked for its aggressively jingoistic tone. Around 2010, an internet user created a satirical, incoherent rant parodying Serbian nationalist rhetoric, beginning with "remove kebab" and ending with the claim that Tupac is alive in Serbia. Although the rant was originally intended to parody online ultranationalism, its satirical origins were largely forgotten as the phrase was adopted by the alt-right.

The meme gained popularity amongst fans of Hearts of Iron IV and Europa Universalis IV, grand strategy computer games by Paradox Interactive, where it referred to the player aiming to defeat the Ottoman Empire or other Islamic nations within these games. The word "kebab" was eventually banned from Paradox Interactive's official forums due to frequent use by the alt-right and other ultranationalists. Shortly after the Christchurch mosque shootings, the meme was also banned from Reddit communities based around Paradox Interactive games. The meme also appeared in over 800 threads in the r/The_Donald subreddit.

The song's popularity grew among far-right circles in the West, becoming far more widely known internationally than in the Balkans. The accordion player in the video became a popular 4chan meme known as "Dat Face Soldier" or "Remove Kebab". Online users widely identified him as Novislav Đajić—a Bosnian Serb soldier convicted in Germany by the Bavarian Higher Regional Court for his role in the murder of 14 people near Foča during the war, resulting in a five-year prison sentence and deportation in 1997. However, scholars and participants have noted that this identification is an unfounded rumour.

Academic research found that in a dataset obtained by scraping Know Your Meme in 2018, "Remove Kebab" constituted 1 of every 200 entries per community in a data set sampled for political memes. "Remove Kebab" was particularly common on Gab, an alt-tech social media platform known for its far-right userbase. The video and its anti-Muslim messaging also helped spread Serbian nationalist tropes among the global far right.

On 29 May 2020, Chicago Police Department radios were jammed with the song during the George Floyd protests in Chicago.

=== Christchurch mosque shootings ===
Brenton Harrison Tarrant, the Australian gunman in the Christchurch mosque shootings, had the phrase "Remove Kebab" written on one of his weapons. In his manifesto The Great Replacement (named after a far-right theory of the same name by French writer Renaud Camus), he describes himself as a "part-time kebab removalist". He also livestreamed himself playing the song in his car minutes before the shooting.

Following the shootings, various videos of the song were removed from YouTube, including some with over a million views. Users quickly re-uploaded the tune, saying it was to "protest censorship". In an interview following the shooting, lead singer Željko Grmuša said, "It is terrible what that guy did in New Zealand, of course I condemn that act. I feel sorry for all those innocent people. But he started killing and he would do that no matter what song he listened to." The song is still commonly used around far-right and alt-right circles as a meme promoting the Great Replacement conspiracy theory.

== See also ==
- Bojna Čavoglave
- Baja Mali Knindža
- Counter-jihad
- Music and political warfare
