= Settle for More =

Book by Megyn Kelly

- Author: Megyn Kelly
- Language: English
- Subject: Autobiography
- Publisher: Harper
- Publication date: November 15, 2016
- Publication place: United States
- Media type: Print (Hardcover) and eBook
- Pages: 352
- ISBN: 978-0-06-249460-3

Settle for More is a 2016 autobiography written by American journalist and political commentator Megyn Kelly. The book discusses the unwanted sexual advances she received from Roger Ailes while working at Fox News, as well as her feud with then Presidential nominee Donald Trump.

== Summary ==
Kelly writes about her childhood and upbringing, her college years, her time spent as a practicing litigator, and her television career during her time at Fox News. The book is notable for its details Kelly shares about her relationships with Donald Trump and her former boss Roger Ailes.

Kelly explained the title for the book is a turn of phrase based on advice she received from Dr. Phil McGraw, "He said the only difference between you and someone you envy is you settled for less. It just spoke to me."

== Reception ==
Entertainment Weekly's Tina Jordan noted the book's engrossing discussion of the author's dealings with Roger Ailes and Donald Trump, but said the book offered more than just these intriguing events: "The story of her years as an attorney and her subsequent rise in TV journalism is surprisingly moving, transforming Settle for More into a Lean In-ish primer for young women about the importance of hard work, self-esteem, and—most of all—perseverance." Lorraine Ali wrote in the Los Angeles Times, "In prose that is simple, clean and straightforward, Kelly comes across in the book as casual and warm one minute, formal and stiff the next. It’s a duality that reflects her on-screen personality."

The day after the book's release, the Los Angeles Times reported that Donald Trump supporters were leaving one-star reviews to hurt sales of the book. HarperCollins noticed the high number of negative reviews, despite having only made a few advance copies available. The detractors were reportedly mobilized through a pro-Trump Reddit forum called /r/The Donald. Amazon removed many but not all of the fake reviews, while reviews from verified purchasers were higher than those of unverified ones.

Settle for More received mixed reviews from some media outlets, with the Pittsburgh Post-Gazette writing, "the larger problem of Settle for More is that Ms. Kelly can’t quite decide what she wants it to be: A gossipy tell-all? An empowering self-help book? The basis for a Lifetime television movie? It’s this lack of cohesion that ultimately makes Settle for More a bit of a letdown." Slate wrote of the Settle for More, "The book itself is often as wholesome as apple pie, and as unwise to consume in large servings." In another, generally positive review, The New Yorker conceded that Settle for More, "is written with the political delicacy of a person still negotiating her next contract."
