= Beatrix Runs =

Studio album by Elizaveta Khripounova
- Released: January 24, 2012
- Recorded: 2011
- Genre: Pop
- Length: 38:03
- Label: Universal Republic
- Producer: Greg Wells, Elizaveta Khripounova

Elizaveta Khripounova chronology
Elizaveta EP (2011)	Beatrix Runs (2012)

Beatrix Runs is the major label debut album by singer-songwriter Elizaveta Khripounova, known professionally as Elizaveta. It was released digitally on iTunes Store and Amazon MP3 on January 24, 2012.

== Track listing ==
1. "Dreamer" – 3:18
2. "Meant" – 4:33
3. "Armies of Your Heart" – 3:08
4. "Snow in Venice" – 3:28
5. "Nightflyers" – 3:15
6. "Orion" – 3:44
7. "Beatrix Runs" – 3:26
8. "Odi et Amo" – 4:34
9. "Victory" – 4:34
10. "Goodbye Song" – 4:18

== Personnel ==
- Elizaveta Khripounova – Piano, Vocals, and Keyboard.
- Greg Wells – Producer, mixer.
