= Centipede (Knife Party song) =

Song by Knife Party

from the album Rage Valley
- Released: 27 May 2012
- Recorded: 2012
- Genre: Brostep
- Length: 4:06
- Label: Earstorm; Big Beat
- Songwriters: Rob Swire; Gareth McGrillen
- Producers: Rob Swire; Gareth McGrillen

Music video
- Centipede on YouTube

"Centipede" is a song from the Knife Party EP Rage Valley. Upon its release, it hit #47 on Billboard's Dance/Electronic Songs.

== Background ==
The song sampled a segment from the Discovery Channel series The World's Most Feared Animals. This sample was also used in Tarantula / Fasten Your Seatbelt.

== In popular culture ==
The song was featured on the television series The Wrong Mans as well as the video game Guitar Hero Live. The song is popular in the rhythm games "Beat Saber" and "osu!" During the 2016 United States presidential election, the song was associated with Donald Trump, especially its use in the video series "You Can't Stump the Trump". The terms "centipede" and "nimble navigator" were also used by Trump supporters on /r/The Donald subreddit.

== Charts ==
Chart (2012–13)	Peak position
Australia Dance (ARIA)	11
Australia Singles (ARIA)	82
UK Dance (Official Charts Company)	19
UK Singles (Official Charts Company)	86
US Billboard Hot Dance/Electronic Songs	47
