= Elizaveta Khripounova =

American singer-songwriter

Elizaveta
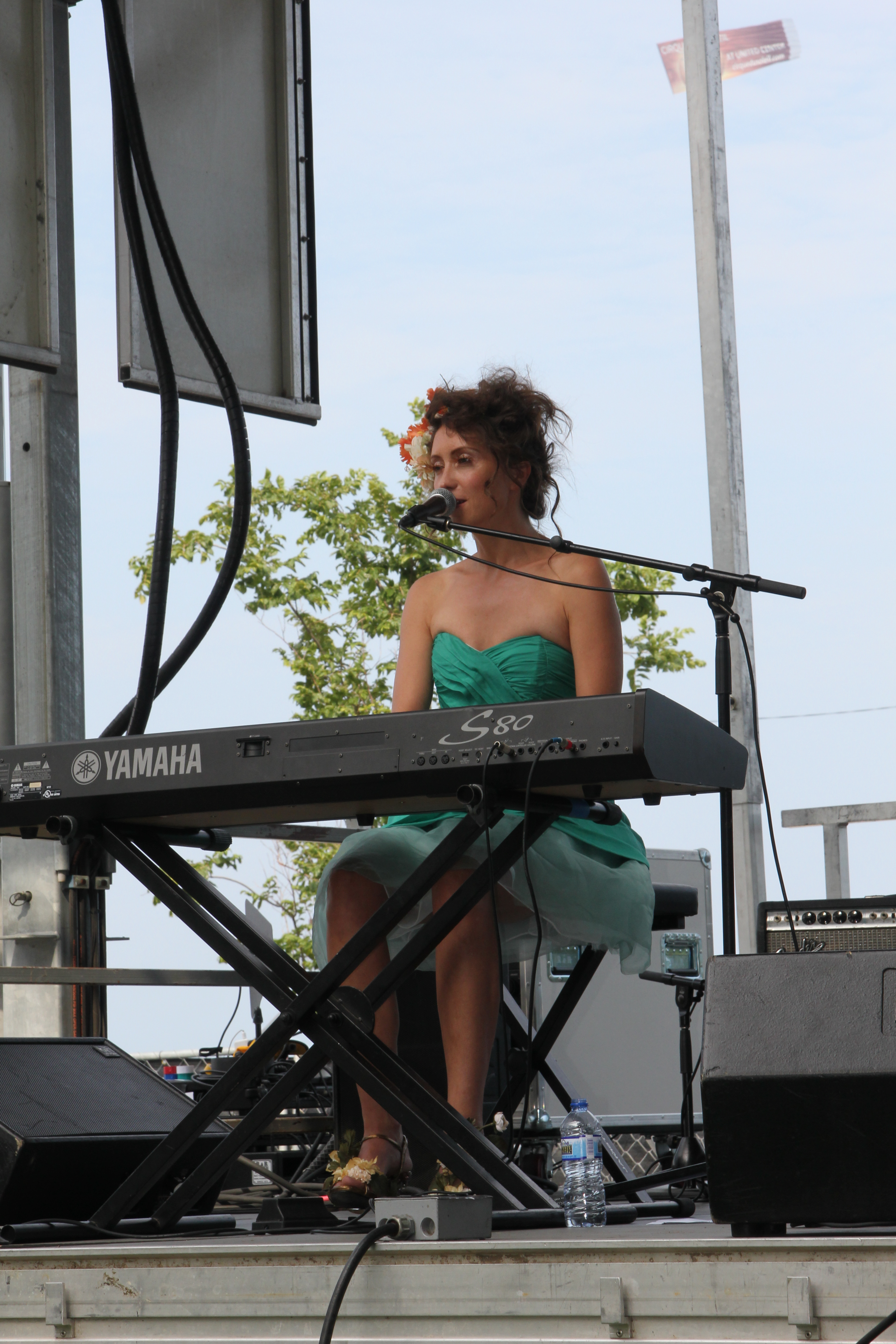
- Elizaveta performing in 2011

Background information
- Also known as: Elizaveta, Elly K
- Born: Elizaveta Igorevna Khripounova; New York City, US
- Origin: Moscow, Russia
- Genres: Alternative pop; rock; classical crossover; easy listening; acoustic; pop; jazz; opera
- Occupations: Pianist; singer; songwriter; opera singer
- Instrument: Piano
- Years active: 2004–present
- Label: Universal Republic Records
- Website: http://www.elizaveta.com/

Elizaveta Igorevna Khripounova (Russian: Елизавета Игоревна Хрипунова), formerly known as Elly K, is a Russian-American pianist, singer/songwriter and opera singer.

== Early life ==
Elizaveta was born in New York City and raised in Moscow, Russia. She left Moscow when she was sixteen.

== Career ==
Elizaveta is a pianist, singer/songwriter, and opera singer with classical training.

In 2007 she released a digital EP "Like Water". The title track was featured in the 2008 motion picture The House Bunny. Her song "Gravity" was featured in the 2010 motion picture Ice Castles.

Her debut full-length album Beatrix Runs was produced by Grammy Award-winner Greg Wells and was digitally released on Universal Republic Records 24 January 2012 exclusively via iTunes. The album was physically released through Amazon on 17 July 2012. Also on 17 July 2012, Elizaveta released her iTunes Session EP.

In 2013 Khripounova performed at the TED Global 2013.

On 17 March 2014 the first single from the Hero EP was remixed by electronic music duo Pegboard Nerds and featured in the viral video "Superman with a GoPro" which has over 20 million views on YouTube. On 14 April 2014, Khripounova released the Hero EP which reached #38 on Billboard's Heatseaker's Charts. On the same day, The A.V. Club premiered a video for the song "Sorry" which featured Malece Miller and Nico Greetham from the television show, So You Think You Can Dance.

Elizaveta's songs have been featured in ABC's Scandal, Pretty Little Liars and The Affair. Elizaveta also sings the Tavern Songs in the award-winning role playing video game Dragon Age Inquisition, as the bard Maryden Halewell.

Elizaveta's first single from her 2015 album Messenger is called 'Trap' and is featured in a Russian motion picture "Призрак"(2015).

In 2019 she released Meet Again in honor of the Kyoto Animation tragedy. Proceeds from the song went to victims in recovery.

== Discography ==
- The Piano Girl (EP, 2002, Elly K) - as Elly K
- Intangible (2004, RussianChicksRule! Records) - as Elly K
- Breakfast With Chopin (2006)
- "Like Water" (2008)
- Elizaveta (EP, 2011, Universal Republic)
  - "Dreamer" (2011, Universal Republic)
- Beatrix Runs (2012, Universal Republic)
- Elizaveta: iTunes Session EP (2012, Universal Republic)
- "Hero" (with Pegboard Nerds) (2014, Monstercat)
- Elizaveta: Hero EP (2014, Flower Army Records)
- "Messenger" (2015, Flower Army Records)
- "Extraordinary" (with Pegboard Nerds and Spyker) (2017, Monstercat)
- "SOS" (2018, Flower Army Records)
- "Drifters" (with Feint) (2019, Monstercat)
- "Archangel" (with Timur) (2020, Flower Army Records)
