= Superstar (Pegboard Nerds and Nghtmre song) =

Single by Pegboard Nerds and Nghtmre featuring Krewella
- Released: 27 May 2016
- Genre: Dubstep
- Length: 3:25
- Label: Monstercat
- Songwriter(s): Jahan Yousaf; Yasmine Yousaf
- Producer(s): Alexander Odden; Michael Parsberg; Tyler Marenyi

Pegboard Nerds singles chronology
"Heartbit VIP" (2015)	"Superstar" (2016)	"Weaponize" (2016)

Nghtmre singles chronology
"Power" (2015)	"Superstar" (2016)	"Need You" (2016)

Krewella singles chronology
"Can't Forget You" (2016)	"Superstar" (2016)	"Team" (2017)

Music video
- "Superstar" on YouTube

"Superstar" is a song by Danish-Norwegian electronic music duo Pegboard Nerds and American DJ Nghtmre featuring American electronic dance music band Krewella. It was released on 27 May 2016 by independent electronic record label Monstercat. Prior to release, the song was premiered during a DJ set by Pegboard Nerds and Krewella at the Avalon Hollywood nightclub in early 2016. The song has since received numerous remixes from various artists including Kandy, Olly, and Aero Chord.

== Music video ==
A music video was released on the same week as the song. It features a woman with a futuristic paint gun creating graffiti in New York City at night.

== Charts ==
Chart (2016)	Peak position
US Dance/Mix Show Airplay (Billboard)	28
