= Nghtmre =

American DJ and producer (born 1990)

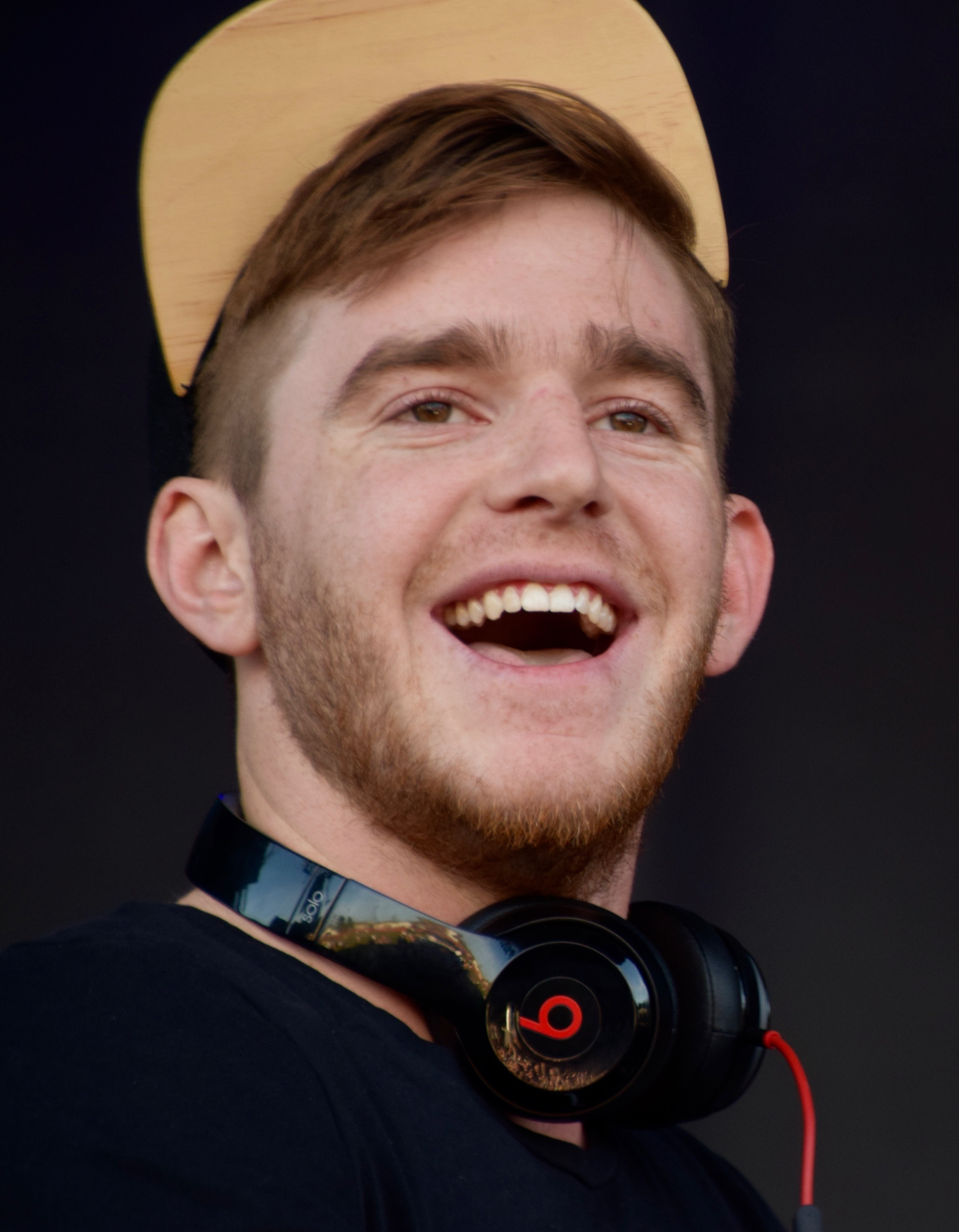
- Nghtmre performing at St. Lawrence University's Springfest concert on April 16, 2016.

Background information
- Born: Tyler Marenyi; 11 October 1990 (age 35); Stamford, Connecticut, United States
- Origin: Raleigh, North Carolina, United States
- Genres: Trap; dubstep; house; future bass; electro house
- Occupations: DJ; musician
- Instrument: Ableton Live
- Years active: 2014–present
- Labels: Circus; Mad Decent; Monstercat; Owsla

Tyler Marenyi (born October 11, 1990), better known by his stage name Nghtmre (stylized as in all caps; pronounced "nightmare"), is an American DJ and electronic dance music producer from Raleigh, North Carolina.

== Early life ==
Marenyi was born in Stamford, Connecticut, but was raised in Raleigh, North Carolina. He attended North Raleigh Christian Academy, where he was a member of the tennis team. He went to Elon University and obtained a degree in finance prior to moving to Los Angeles to pursue a musical career. He then attended Icon Collective Music Production School where he met fellow producers Derek and Scott of Slander and developed a working relationship, subsequently resulted in numerous collaborations and frequently touring together as headlining acts.

== Career ==
=== 2014–2015 ===
In the beginning, he created trap and house remixes of songs by Tiësto, Rae Sremmurd, and Skrillex. Later on, he started producing his own songs, as well as, collaborating with other producers. He gained recognition when Skrillex played one of his songs during a set at Ultra Music Festival. Marenyi eventually signed to Diplo's record label, Mad Decent and had his first song, "Street", released shortly after. He debuted at EDC Las Vegas 2015, which was his first festival performance. He has regularly toured and collaborated with fellow DJs and producers, Slander, with whom he released his debut EP, Nuclear Bonds, also later released on Mad Decent.

=== 2016–present ===
In 2016, he released his EP titled Nghtmre which had charted on Billboard's Top Dance/Electronic Albums chart. He collaborated with Pegboard Nerds and Krewella to release "Superstar" as a single on the Vancouver-based label, Monstercat. He later collaborated with producer Dillon Francis to release the single "Need You" on Mad Decent. An official music video for the song was released by Francis on May 9, 2016, via YouTube. He later collaborated with Flux Pavilion to release "Feel Your Love" as a single on his label, Circus Records. He collaborated with rapper Afro to release the single "Stronger" which would also be released on Mad Decent. He additionally collaborated with Toronto-based production duo Zeds Dead to release "Frontlines" as a single which would later be released on their debut album Northern Lights through their label, Deadbeats. He collaborated with LOUDPVCK to release "Click Clack" as a single through Skrillex's Owsla label. In 2017, Marenyi was in the lineup at Coachella Valley Music and Arts Festival.

== Discography ==
=== Albums ===
Title	Details
Drmvrse	Released: September 9, 2022; Label: Unsound / Lowly; Format: Digital download
MINDFULL	• Released: August 29, 2025 • Label: Gud Vibrations • Format: Digital download

=== Extended plays ===
Title	Details	Peak chart positions
Title	Details	US Dance
Nuclear Bonds (with Slander)	Released: October 13, 2015; Label: Mad Decent; Format: Digital download	—
Nghtmre	Released: March 25, 2016; Label: Mad Decent; Format: Digital download	17
Magic Hour (with Pell)	Released: June 15, 2018; Label: Mad Decent; Format: Digital download	—
"—" denotes a recording that did not chart or was not released.

=== Singles ===
Title	Year	Peak chart positions	Album
Title	Year	US Dance	Album
"Walking on Sunshine" (with Richard Vission featuring Jackie Boyz)	2014	—	Non-album singles
"Mtrd"	2015	—	Non-album singles
"Street"	2015	—	Non-album singles
"Aftershock" (with Boombox Cartel)	2015	—	Non-album singles
"You" (with Slander)	2015	—	Nuclear Bonds
"Warning" (with Slander)	2015	—	Nuclear Bonds
"Power" (with Slander)	2015	—	Nuclear Bonds
"Superstar" (with Pegboard Nerds featuring Krewella)	2016	—	Non-album singles
"Need You" (with Dillon Francis)	2016	21	Non-album singles
"Feel Your Love" (with Flux Pavilion featuring Jamie Lewis)	2016	—	Non-album singles
"Frontlines" (with Zeds Dead featuring GG MAGREE)	2016	—	Non-album singles
"Click Clack" (with Loudpvck)	2016	—	Non-album singles
"Stronger" (with Afro)	2016	—	Non-album singles
"Gud Vibrations" (with Slander)	2016	—	Non-album singles
"End of the Night" (with Ghastly)	2017	—	Non-album singles
"Embrace" (with Carmada featuring Xavier Dunn)	2017	—	Non-album singles
"Only Want U" (with Snails featuring Akylla)	2017	—	Non-album singles
"On the Run" (featuring Passeport)	2017	—	NGHTMRE, Pt. II
"The Killer" (featuring Bret James and Rnsom)	2017	—	NGHTMRE, Pt. II
"No Coming Down" (featuring Alex Wiley and Sky Montique)	2017	—	NGHTMRE, Pt. II
"Another Dimension" (with Dillon Francis)	2017	—	NGHTMRE, Pt. II
"Grave" (with Wavedash)	2018	—	Non-album single
"Save Yourself" (with The Chainsmokers)	2018	21	Sick Boy
"Like That" (with Big Gigantic)	2018	—	Non-album singles
"Bang" (with Shaq and Lil Jon)	2019	—	Non-album singles
"Redlight" (with ASAP Ferg)	2019	—	Non-album singles
"Man's First Inhibition" (with Zhu and Kid Keem)	2019	—	Non-album singles
"Bruises" (with Grabbitz)	2019	—	Non-album singles
"Cash Cow" (with Gunna)	2019	—	Non-album singles
"Feeling Gud" (with Slander)	2020	34	Non-album singles
"Wrist" (featuring Tory Lanez)	2020	—	Non-album singles
"Nuclear Bass Face" (with Subtronics)	2020	—	Non-album singles
"Tu Tu Tu (That's Why We)" (with Galantis and Liam O'Donnell)	2020	—	Non-album singles
"Falling" (with Klaxx)	2021	—	Non-album singles
"Speak Easy" (with Alexandar Smash featuring Ghostlo)	2021	—	Non-album singles
"Scars" (featuring Yung Pinch)	2021	—	Non-album singles
"Mosh" (with Smokepurpp)	2021	—	Non-album singles
"Shell Shock" (with Zomboy featuring Georgia Ku)	2021	—	Non-album singles
"Shady Intentions"/"Shady Intentions VIP" (with Zeds Dead featuring Tori Levett)	2021	40	Drmvrse
"Fall into Me" (with Slander featuring Dylan Matthew)	2022	33	Drmvrse
"Nothing's Perfect" (featuring Oliver Tree)	2022	42	Drmvrse
"Angel" (with Subfocus and Dimension featuring Mogleta)	2024		
"—" denotes a recording that did not chart or was not released in that territory.

=== Remixes ===
- 2018: Ekali and Zhu — "Blame" (Nghtmre Remix)
- 2019: Dillon Francis and Alison Wonderland — "Lost My Mind" (Nghtmre Remix)
- 2019: Seven Lions, Slander and Dabin featuring Dylan Matthew — "First Time" (Nghtmre Remix)
- 2019: Habstrakt — "The One" (Nghtmre Remix)
- 2019: Nghtmre and ASAP Ferg — "Redlight" (Nghtmre VIP)
- 2019: Nghtmre and Gunna — "Cash Cow" (Nghtmre and Blvk Jvck VIP)
- 2020: Cheat Codes featuring Trippie Redd, Blackbear, Prince$$ Rosie — "No Service in the Hills" (Nghtmre Remix)
- 2020: Falling in Reverse — "Popular Monster" (Galantis and Nghtmre Remix)
- 2020: Zhu — "I Admit It" (Nghtmre Remix)
- 2021: Illenium and Matt Maeson — "Heavenly Side" (Nghtmre Remix)
- 2024: Noisia - Voodoo (Nghtmre Remix)
