= Battle Sirens =

Single by Knife Party featuring Tom Morello

from the album The Atlas Underground
- Released: 9 September 2016; 2 December 2016 (UK)
- Genre: Nu metal; drumstep; trap
- Length: 4:04
- Label: Earstorm; Big Beat
- Songwriters: Rob Swire, Gareth McGrillen, Tom Morello
- Producers: Rob Swire; Gareth McGrillen

Music video
- Battle Sirens on YouTube

"Battle Sirens" is a single by the Australian duo Knife Party featuring guitarist Tom Morello from the band Rage Against the Machine and Audioslave.

== Background ==
In an interview with Rolling Stone, Members of Knife Party stated "Tom (Morello) hit us up when we were in the studio saying he'd always loved the idea of merging his guitar riffs into the electronic world and we bounced some ideas back and forth until we had the final version" and added that Performing this track live as a surprise during their Ultra set was insane. Tom Morello said "'Battle Sirens' is the cross genre hard guitar/hard EDM mashup I've been waiting to hear for years. The devastating grooves, monster drops and insane tension that are a hallmark of both Knife Party and Rage Against the Machine are elevated to a crazy level with this jam." The single is featured as the opening track on Morello's solo album The Atlas Underground.

== Charts ==
Chart (2016–2017)	Peak position
US Billboard Dance/Electronic Digital Song Sales	43

== Battle Sirens EP ==
1. "Battle Sirens" – 4:05
2. "Battle Sirens" (Ephwurd Remix) – 3:56
3. "Battle Sirens" (Brillz remix) – 3:57
4. "Battle Sirens" (Live Version) – 4:05

== Remixes ==
Apart from the remixes included in the EP, American duo RIOT made a remix of the track. Knife Party often close their live shows with this remix.
