= Knife Party =

Australian electronic music duo

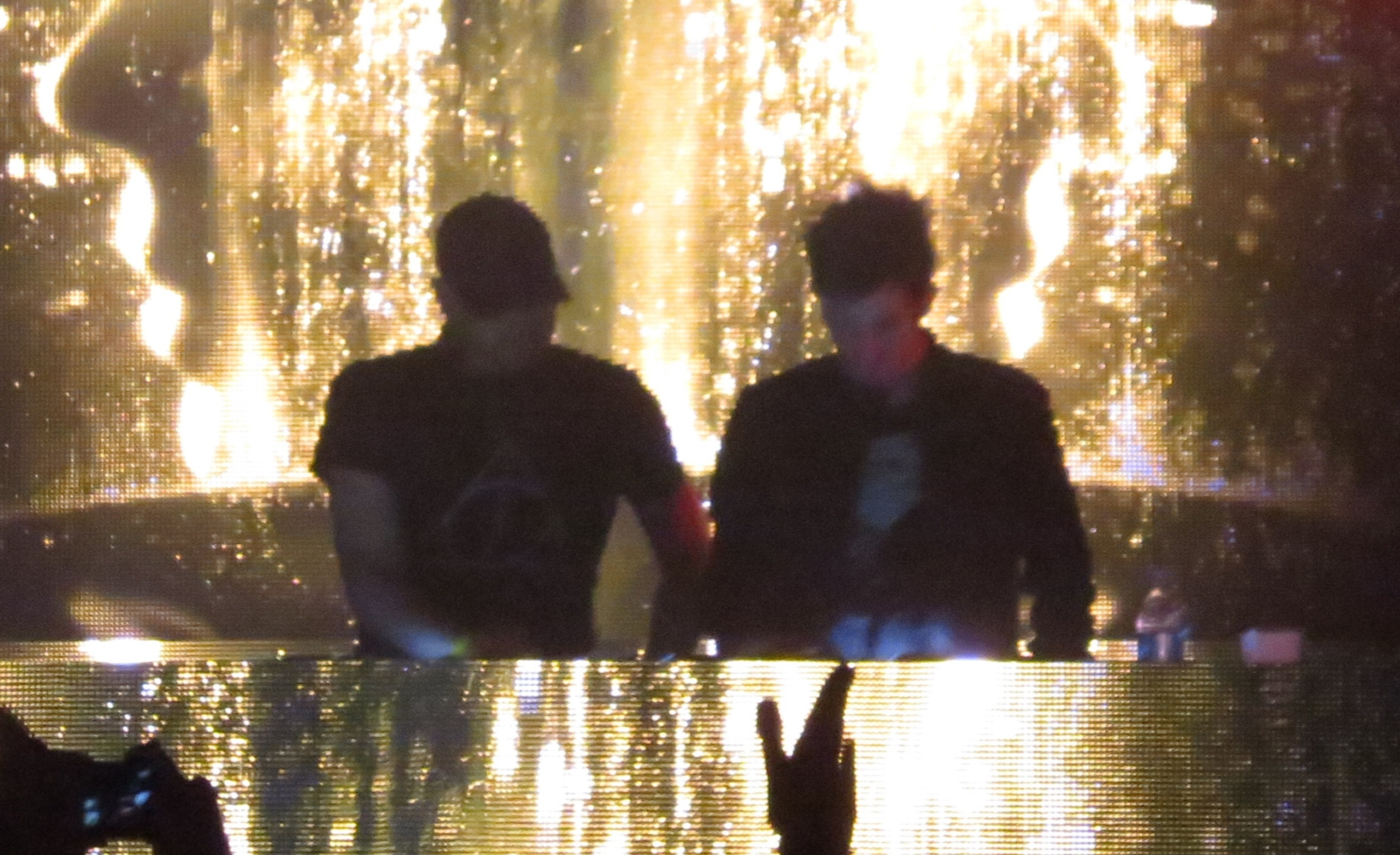
- Knife Party in 2015. L-R; Gareth McGrillen, Rob Swire

Background information
- Origin: Perth, Western Australia, Australia
- Genres: Electro house; drumstep; dubstep; complextro; EDM
- Years active: 2011–present
- Labels: Earstorm; Big Beat; Warner Bros.; Monstercat
- Spinoff of: Pendulum
- Members: Rob Swire; Gareth McGrillen
- Website: knifeparty.com

Knife Party are an Australian electronic music duo consisting of Rob Swire and Gareth McGrillen, two members of the drum and bass band Pendulum.

The duo has worked with artists such as Swedish House Mafia, Steve Aoki, MistaJam, Foreign Beggars, I See MONSTAS, Tom Staar, Pegboard Nerds and Tom Morello.

Knife Party peaked at 23rd on DJMag's 2013 Top 100 DJs rankings.

== History ==
=== 2002–2010: Origin ===
Rob Swire and Gareth McGrillen met in 2002 and have since performed music in various different bands and music projects. They along with Paul Harding formed the drum and bass band Pendulum. The duo started Knife Party as a side project to Pendulum. However, after the project's success and mass popularity, Knife Party became their primary project.

The name is derived from the Deftones song "Knife Prty" featured on the 2000 album White Pony. Knife Party's name caused consternation at first, as some said the name showed support for knife crime. Rob Swire rebutted this during an interview stating "we're not advocating any type of knife-related crime any more than Swedish House Mafia were advocating organised crime."

=== 2011–2012: 100% No Modern Talking and Rage Valley ===
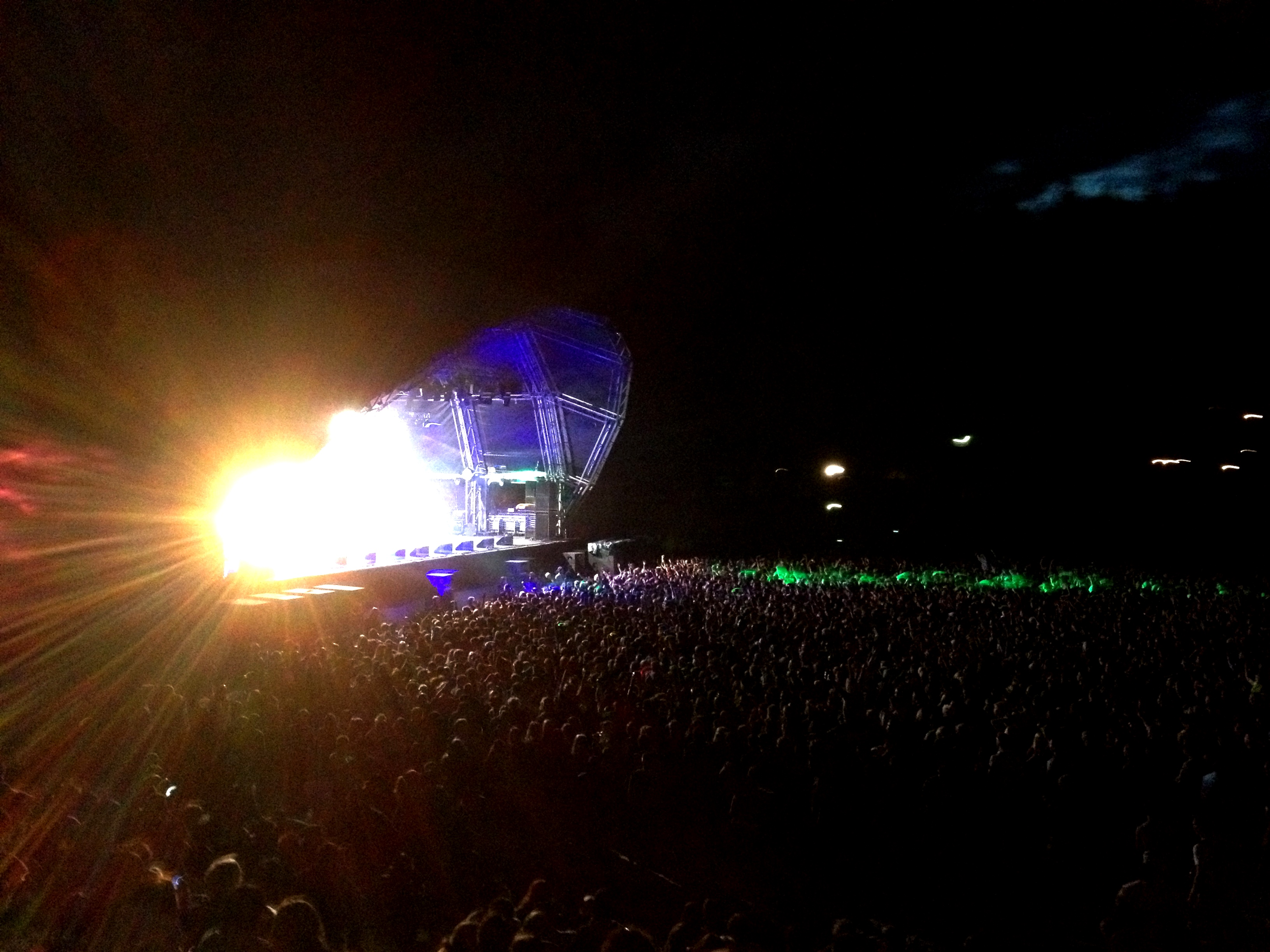
Knife Party performing Rage Valley tracks at Hove Festival, 2012

On 25 May 2011, Swire previewed a teaser of a Knife Party remix on SoundCloud labeled "Not Pendulum", which later turned out to be their remix of Swedish House Mafia's "Save the World".

Knife Party's first EP, 100% No Modern Talking, was released digitally through Warner Bros. Records on 12 December 2011. The EP originally was to feature "Back to the Z-List" but was replaced with "Destroy Them with Lazers" as the duo had decided to abandon the track. The EP title refers to the lack of "Modern Talking", a wavetable in the software synthesiser NI Massive commonly used to create "talking" basslines.

Their second EP, Rage Valley, was released digitally through EarStorm and Big Beat. It was made available for purchase on Beatport and iTunes on 27 May 2012.

The song "Bonfire", released on this EP, was featured on an episode of AMC's Breaking Bad and in the video game WWE 2K15 (the latter of which features the instrumental version on its official soundtrack). The EP was also Knife Party's first-ever entry on the Billboard 200, peaking at 75.

=== 2013–2014: Haunted House and Abandon Ship ===
Their third EP Haunted House, was released on 6 May 2013 digitally through EarStorm and Big Beat. The EP was leaked on 29 April 2013 and was uploaded in its officially on 5 May 2013. The EP entered into the iTunes Top 10 Albums Chart and peaked at 3. It also hit number 1 Electro House Album on Beatport. The EP was also Knife Party's first Top 40 entry on the Billboard 200, peaking at 37.

In May 2014 Swire stated that the debut Knife Party album was near completion and that they were in their final stages of finishing it. In June it was announced that the album would be titled Abandon Ship.

"Resistance" the first single off the album was released on 25 August 2014. The album was scheduled for release on 24 November 2014. The second promotional single, "Begin Again", was released on 22 September 2014 and the song entered the UK Singles Chart at number 183.

On 7 November 2014, iTunes accidentally released Abandon Ship early, causing Knife Party to have to release the album early on all platforms. Knife Party's Rob Swire mentioned in a tweet that he was happy with the album leaking, but that he felt it made "months of arguments about release dates and watermarks pointless."

=== 2015–2016: Trigger Warning and Battle Sirens ===
Evidence of a possible new EP made itself known during their performance at Ultra Music Festival 2015 where they debuted three new tracks: Parliament Funk, PLUR Police and Kraken ft. Tom Staar.

On 13 November Knife Party tweeted on their official Twitter page that they will be releasing the EP on 20 November 2015.

At Kingsday Festival 2015 they premiered a brand new collaboration with Tom Morello of Rage Against the Machine. During Ultra Music Festival 2016, Knife Party closed out the festival and brought out Tom Morello to perform a live version of the collaboration. The track was later announced to be titled "Battle Sirens" and released worldwide on 9 September 2016. Official remixes by Brillz and Ephwurd were released shortly after as well as a Live version from the Ultra performance. The original and remixes were collected together in an EP release on 2 December 2016.

=== 2017–2018: Knifecast Begins and Singles ===
At a Life in Color event held in Manchester on 3 February 2018, they played out a remix of Pendulum's "Blood Sugar" that was released with the Pendulum's Reworks album launching 16 March and releasing in full on 29 June 2018.

On 10 May 2018 Rob revealed the existence of a Pegboard Nerds collaboration on Twitter. This collaboration was eventually titled "Harpoon" and released as part of the Pegboard Nerds' Full Hearts EP in July.

The subreddit r/electronicmusic hosted an AMA with Rob Swire discussing upcoming songs and miscellaneous topics on 13 July 2018

Rob and Gareth premiered their live radio show titled "Knifecast" on 20 September 2018. The show was a mix "between a podcast and just playing music". At the end of the episode they premiered a new Dubstep ID, titled Lost Souls.

During their eighth Knifecast podcast on 16 November 2018, Rob and Gareth premiered another new track tentatively named "Ghost Town", which eventually became "Death & Desire", and showcased several previous versions of the track.

=== 2019–present: Lost Souls ===
On 17 April 2019, Knife Party previewed the track "Ghost Train", a minimal tech house track, from their EP Lost Souls on the 13th episode of their podcast. The tracklist for the "Lost Souls" The EP also included the tracks "No Saint", "Lost Souls", and "Death & Desire" (featuring Harrison), and was released on 19 July. The EP debuted at No. 7 on the US Billboard Dance/Electronic Album Sales chart in August. The song "Death & Desire" debuted at No. 35 on Billboard's Dance/Mix Show Airplay chart on 14 December. In addition to four tracks, Muzz's remix of "Ghost Train", Laidback Luke's remix of "Death & Desire" and Annix's remix of "Lost Souls" were also released.

== Production ==
Knife Party use the digital audio workstation application Nuendo for production. In an interview with Sound on sound Swire mentions he used to use Logic Pro, but switched to Nuendo, mainly due to the linking system and workflow environment. Most of the sounds emulated are virtual instruments (VST). They also use outboard gear such as Tube-Tech SMC 2B Stereo Multi-Band Compressor.

== Discography ==
=== Studio albums ===
Title	Details	Peak chart positions				
Title	Details	AUS	NZ	UK	US	US Dance
Abandon Ship	Released: 27 October 2014; Label: Big Beat, Earstorm; Formats: Digital download, CD	20	30	39	54	2

=== Extended plays ===
Title	Details	Peak chart positions					
Title	Details	AUS	AUT	CAN	UK	US	US Dance
100% No Modern Talking	Released: 12 December 2011; Label: Earstorm; Formats: Digital download	31	—	―	—	― (Note: "100% No Modern Talking" did not enter the Billboard 200 chart, but peaked at no. 24 on the Heatseekers Albums chart.)	21
Rage Valley	Released: 27 May 2012; Label: Earstorm, Big Beat; Formats: Digital download	95	—	―	71	75	3
Haunted House	Released: 5 May 2013; Label: Earstorm, Big Beat; Formats: Digital download	77	44	17	—	37	1
Trigger Warning	Released: 20 November 2015; Label: Earstorm, Big Beat; Formats: Digital download	—	—	—	—	—	―
Lost Souls	Released: 19 July 2019; Label: Earstorm, Big Beat; Formats: Digital download	—	—	—	—	—	— (Note: Lost Souls did not enter the Billboard Dance/Electronic Albums chart, but peaked at number 7 on the Dance/Electronic Album Sales chart.)
"—" denotes a recording that did not chart or was not released in that territory.

=== Singles ===
Title	Year	Peak chart positions										Certifications	Album
Title	Year	AUS	AUT	BEL	FIN	IRL	NLD	SWE	SWI	UK	US Dance	Certifications	Album
"Internet Friends"	2011	―	―	106	―	―	―	―	―	83	37		100% No Modern Talking
"Antidote" (with Swedish House Mafia)	2011	—	30	35	13	39	49	17	70	4	25	BPI: Silver; GLF: 3× Platinum	Until Now
"Rage Valley"	2012	―	―	―	―	―	―	―	―	―	43		Rage Valley
"Bonfire"	2012	80	―	96	18	―	―	―	―	45	28	BPI: Silver	Rage Valley
"Centipede"	2012	82	—	—	—	—	—	—	—	86	47		Rage Valley
"Power Glove"	2013	―	—	—	—	—	—	—	—	43	―		Haunted House
"LRAD"	2013	―	—	116	—	—	—	—	—	―	50		Haunted House
"Resistance"	2014	—	—	—	—	—	—	—	—	—	―		Abandon Ship
"Begin Again"	2014	—	—	—	—	—	—	—	—	—	―		Abandon Ship
"Boss Mode"	2014	—	—	—	—	—	—	—	—	—	41		Abandon Ship
"PLUR Police"	2015	―	—	—	—	—	—	—	—	―	49		Trigger Warning
"Battle Sirens" (with Tom Morello)	2016	—	—	—	—	—	—	—	—	—	―		The Atlas Underground
"Harpoon" (with Pegboard Nerds)	2018	—	—	—	—	—	—	—	—	—	―		Full Hearts
"—" denotes a recording that did not chart or was not released in that territory.

=== Remixes ===
Title	Year	Original artist(s)	Release
"Save the World"	2011	Swedish House Mafia	Save the World (The Remixes)
"Unison"	2011	Porter Robinson	Spitfire
"Crush on You"	2011	Nero	"Crush on You"
"Last Time"	2012	Labrinth	"Last Time"
"Blood Sugar"	2018	Pendulum	The Reworks

=== Production credits ===
Title	Year	Performing artist(s)	Release
"Apex"	2012	Foreign Beggars	The Uprising

== Awards and nominations ==
=== ARIA Music Awards ===
The ARIA Music Awards is an annual awards ceremony that recognises excellence, innovation, and achievement across all genres of Australian music.

Year	Nominee / work	Award	Result
2012	"Rage Valley"	Best Dance Release	Nominated

=== DJ Magazine top 100 DJs ===
Year	Position	Notes	Ref.
2012	33	New Entry	
2013	25	Up 8	
2014	53	Down 28	
2015	100	Down 47	
