= Pink Cloud (EP) =

EP by Pegboard Nerds
- Released: 21 October 2015
- Recorded: 2015
- Genres: Future bass; indie dance; drumstep
- Length: 18:12
- Label: Monstercat
- Producers: Alexander Odden; Michael Parsberg

Pegboard Nerds chronology
Bring the Madness (The Remixes) (2015)	Pink Cloud (2015)	Get on Up (The Remixes) (2015)

Singles from Pink Cloud
- 1. "Pink Cloud" Released: 30 September 2015; 2. "Emoji" Released: 19 October 2015

Pink Cloud (The Remixes)
- Pink Cloud (The Remixes) cover

Pink Cloud is the fourth extended play by electronic duo Pegboard Nerds. Pink Cloud was released on 21 October 2015, by independent electronic music label Monstercat to help fund breast cancer research.

== Background and composition ==
Odden and Parsberg announced Pink Cloud, stating "We are excited to share this new project with the world. It's a new sound we've been working on for the past couple months, but more importantly, we are on a mission to change lives with our music. We invite you to take a step into our world, Nerd Nation".

== Reception and release ==
Pink Cloud was released on 21 October 2015, to raise money for Breast Cancer research and to raise awareness under the Fuck Cancer initiative. Pink Cloud peaked at No. 2 on the iTunes Dance charts and became widely successful, raising over $20,000 for the cause. Odden & Parsberg stated "Every dollar generated from our Pink Cloud EP, merchandise, and other campaign initiatives will go directly towards funding prevention, early detection and supporting those affected by cancer". The EP contains 4 original songs and a VIP of their 2012 song Fire in the Hole.

== Pink Cloud (The Remixes) ==
A remix album was released on 20 January 2016. The album includes 21 remixes from various artists including Morgan Page, Terravita and Two Friends.

== Track listing ==
=== Pink Cloud ===
No.	Title	Length
1.	"Emoji"	3:40
2.	"Pink Cloud" (featuring Max Collins)	3:35
3.	"Just Like That" (featuring Johnny Graves)	3:24
4.	"Downhearted" (featuring Jonny Rose)	3:30
5.	"End Is Near" (Fire in the Hole VIP)	4:03
Total length:		18:12

=== Pink Cloud (The Remixes) ===
No.	Title	Length
1.	"Emoji" (Sunday Service Remix)	4:04
2.	"Emoji" (Faustix & Fat Pony Remix)	3:25
3.	"Emoji" (Thieves & Dr. Fresch Remix)	2:42
4.	"Emoji" (Prismo & Cursor Remix)	3:14
5.	"Emoji" (Rogue Remix)	3:58
6.	"Pink Cloud" (featuring Max Collins, FKYA Remix)	4:42
7.	"Pink Cloud" (featuring Max Collins, JumoDaddy Remix)	3:38
8.	"Pink Cloud" (featuring Max Collins, Madnap Remix)	3:22
9.	"Pink Cloud" (featuring Max Collins, Toby Green Remix)	3:33
10.	"Just Like That" (featuring Johnny Graves, Rusko Remix)	3:04
11.	"Just Like That" (featuring Johnny Graves, Terravita Remix)	3:46
12.	"Just Like That" (featuring Johnny Graves, Tumult Remix)	3:49
13.	"Just Like That" (featuring Johnny Graves, Two Friends Remix)	4:20
14.	"Downhearted" (featuring Jonny Rose, Chimeric Remix)	3:16
15.	"Downhearted" (featuring Jonny Rose, MIU Remix)	3:38
16.	"Downhearted" (featuring Jonny Rose, Morgan Page Remix)	5:19
17.	"Downhearted" (featuring Jonny Rose, Quiet Disorder Remix)	4:51
18.	"Downhearted" (featuring Jonny Rose, Ryos Remix)	4:47
19.	"Downhearted" (featuring Jonny Rose, Topi Remix)	3:21
20.	"End Is Near" (Fire in the Hole VIP, Bear Grillz Remix)	3:05
21.	"End Is Near" (Fire in the Hole VIP, Castor Troy Remix)	4:03
Total length:		1:15:37

== Charts ==
Chart History	Peak position
Billboard Top Dance/Electronic Albums (2015)	9
Billboard Heatseekers (2015)	20
