= Nerds by Nature =

EP by Pegboard Nerds
- Released: 13 January 2017
- Recorded: 2016–17
- Genre: Dubstep; electro house; chillout; future bass
- Length: 22:16
- Label: Monstercat
- Producer: Alexander Odden; Michael Parsberg

Pegboard Nerds chronology
Heartbit (The Remixes) (2016)	Nerds by Nature (2017)	Deep in the Night (The Remixes) (2017)

Singles from Nerds by Nature
- 1. "Blackout" Released: 6 July 2016; 2. "BAMF" Released: 5 October 2016; 3. "Melodymania" Released: 5 December 2016; 4. "Go Berzerk" Released: 13 January 2017

Nerds By Nature (The Remixes)
- Nerds By Nature (The Remixes) cover

Nerds by Nature is the fifth extended play by electronic duo Pegboard Nerds. Nerds by Nature was released on 13 January 2017, by independent electronic music label Monstercat.

== Background and composition ==
When announcing Nerds by Nature, Odden and Parsberg stated “We are very excited for this release! It went back and forth from being an EP and an album but ultimately we ended up with an EP as we felt that would be a stronger package. We’re stoked to have people finally hear the tracks in their full glory”.

== Reception and release ==
Nerds by Nature gained generally positive reviews with Cameron Sunkel of EDM.com stating "there's perhaps no better time to be a fan, as this EP truly has something to offer everyone". Landon Fleury of YourEDM stated "Though Nerds by Nature contains much of the duo’s highest quality material, this clumsy disorganization makes the EP difficult to enjoy as a solid body of work". Harsh Makwana stated "It’s quite apparent that Nerds By Nature is one heck of a musical ride that you wouldn’t want to miss".

== Nerds by Nature (The Remixes) ==
A remix EP was released on 16 May 2017. The EP features 5 remixes from various artists including RIOT, Virtual Riot, Andy C, Gammer, and Quiet Disorder as well as a vocal VIP of Melodymania featuring Anna Yvette as the vocalist.

== Track listing ==
=== Nerds by Nature ===
No.	Title	Length
1.	"Speed of Light"	4:10
2.	"Talk About It" (featuring Desirée Dawson)	3:56
3.	"Melodymania"	3:11
4.	"Go Berzerk" (with Quiet Disorder)	3:28
5.	"BAMF"	3:59
6.	"Blackout"	3:32
Total length:		22:16

=== Nerds by Nature (The Remixes) ===
No.	Title	Length
1.	"Speed of Light" (Andy C remix)	6:29
2.	"Talk About It" (featuring Desirée Dawson, Virtual Riot remix)	3:23
3.	"Melodymania" (featuring Anna Yvette)	3:04
4.	"Go Berzerk" (with Quiet Disorder, Gammer remix)	3:47
5.	"BAMF" (RIOT remix)	4:23
6.	"Blackout" (Quiet Disorder remix)	3:44
Total length:		24:47

== Charts ==
Chart (2017)	Peak position
Top Dance/Electronic Albums (Billboard)	12
