= Haunted House (EP) =

2013 EP by Knife Party

EP by Knife Party
- Released: 5 May 2013
- Genre: Electro house, dubstep
- Length: 18:51
- Label: Earstorm, Big Beat
- Producer: Rob Swire, Gareth McGrillen

Knife Party chronology
Rage Valley (2012)	Haunted House (2013)	Abandon Ship (2014)

Professional ratings
Review scores
Source	Rating
AllMusic	3.5/5 stars

Haunted House is the third EP by the Australian electronic music duo Knife Party, released on 5 May 2013 by Earstorm Records and Big Beat Records. It was announced through their official Twitter page on 8 August 2012.

== Background ==
On 16 April 2013, Knife Party announced on Twitter that they have replaced the track "Baghdad" with a 'VIP' Mix of Internet Friends. Knife Party premiered the official artwork for the EP on 27 April, on their Facebook page. The EP was made available to pre-order in the US on 27 April, with the confirmed release date of 6 May. The EP leaked on 29 April 2013, but the leaked version of "Power Glove" was erroneous because its sub bass was pitched down an octave too low. On 5 May 2013, the EP was uploaded and available to stream in full on Knife Party's official YouTube and SoundCloud accounts. The EP was later released in digital and CD formats a day later. "Power Glove" debuted at #38 on the Scottish Singles Chart and at #43 on the UK Singles Chart on 12 May 2013.

== Track listing ==
No.	Title	Length
1.	"Power Glove"	4:21
2.	"LRAD"	5:15
3.	"EDM Death Machine"	4:23
4.	"Internet Friends" (VIP)	5:01
Total length:		18:59

== Chart performance ==
Charts (2013)	Peak position
Billboard 200	37
Billboard Top Electronic Albums	1
Canadian Albums Chart	17
