= Pegboard Nerds =

Scandinavian electronic music duo

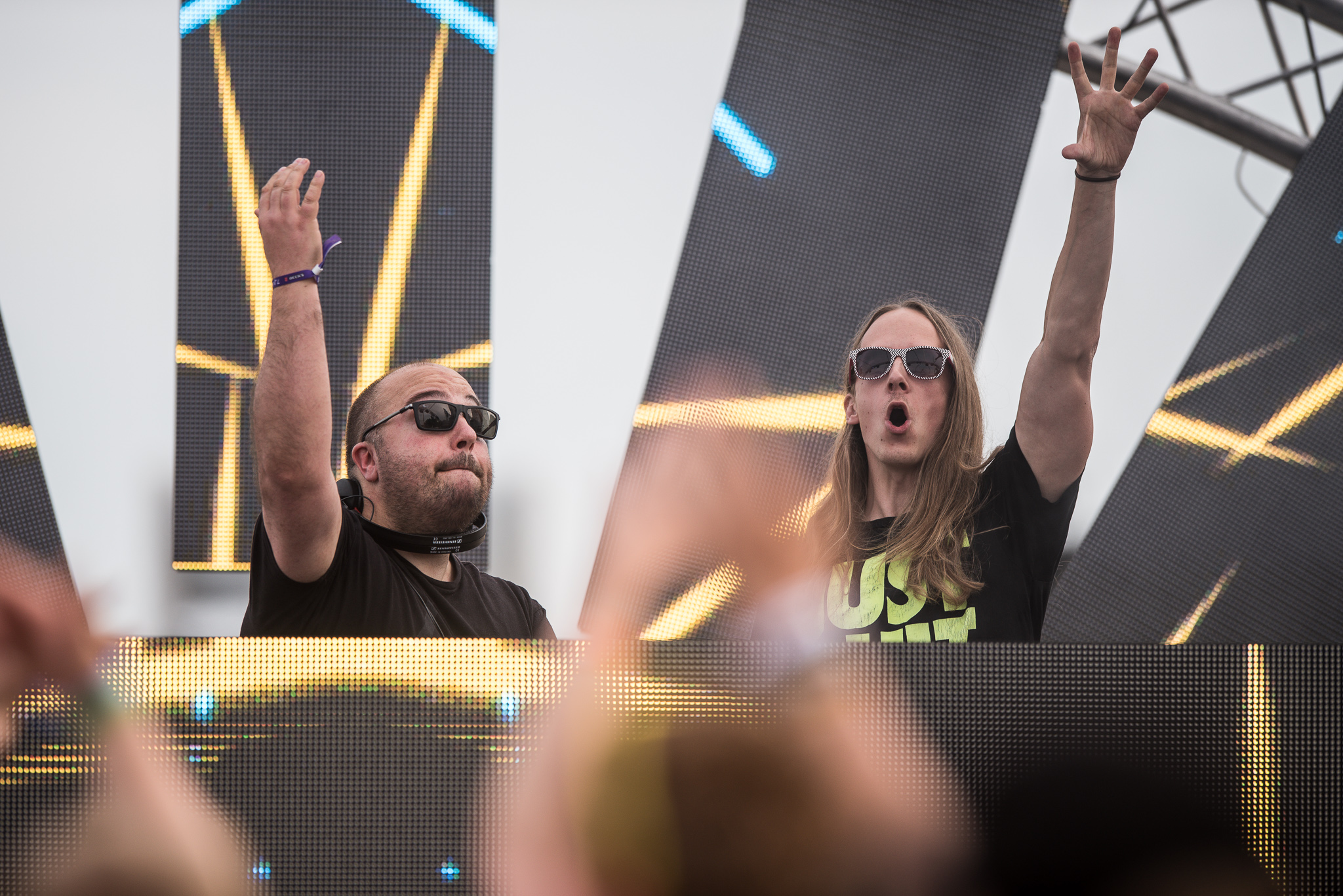
- Parsberg (left) and Odden (right) performing at Open Beatz 2016

Background information
- Origin: Scandinavia
- Genres: EDM; Dubstep; Electro house; bass house; Trap; Drumstep; Glitch hop; Hardstyle
- Instruments: Digital audio workstation (Ableton Live, Pro Tools)
- Works: Pegboard Nerds discography
- Years active: 2011–present
- Labels: Disciple; Monstercat; Columbia; Protocol; Spinnin'; Nerd Nation
- Members: Alexander Odden; Michael Parsberg
- Website: pegboardnerds.com

Pegboard Nerds is a Scandinavian electronic music duo, consisting of Norwegian DJ Alexander Odden and Danish DJ Michael Parsberg. The name Pegboard Nerds is an anagram of the duo's surnames, Odden and Parsberg. The duo first met in 2005 and formed the group in 2011. Previously, their records were released under separate projects and both have been producing since the 1990s.

On 21 October 2015, the duo released Pink Cloud to fund breast cancer research which went to number 2 on iTunes Dance Albums, and into the Top 10 on Billboard Dance albums.

In 2015, their collaboration with Jauz, a single titled "Get on Up", was one of the top bass house songs of the year. "Superstar" with Nghtmre and Krewella was the number 1 dubstep song on the Beatport Dubstep Charts of May 2016 and peaked at 28 on Billboard's Dance/Mix Show Airplay chart in October 2016. Their collaboration "Deep In The Night" with Montreal-based artist Snails was released in August 2016.

In 2017, the duo released Nerds by Nature with a remix EP being released later that year. The EP reached number 12 on the Top Dance/Electronic Albums Billboard charts and received generally positive reviews.

== Chart history ==
Chart History	Pegboard Nerds	Here it Comes	Pink Cloud EP	Superstar	Nerds by Nature EP
Billboard Next Best Sound (2013)	1	-	-	-	-
Billboard Twitter Emerging Artists (2014)	-	22	-	-	-
Billboard Top Dance/Electronic Albums (2015)	-	-	9	-	-
Billboard Heatseekers (2015)	-	-	20	-	-
Billboard Dance/Mix Show Airplay (2016)	-	-	-	28	-
Billboard Top Dance/Electronic Albums (2017)	-	-	-	-	12
